= Vilanant =

- Municipality
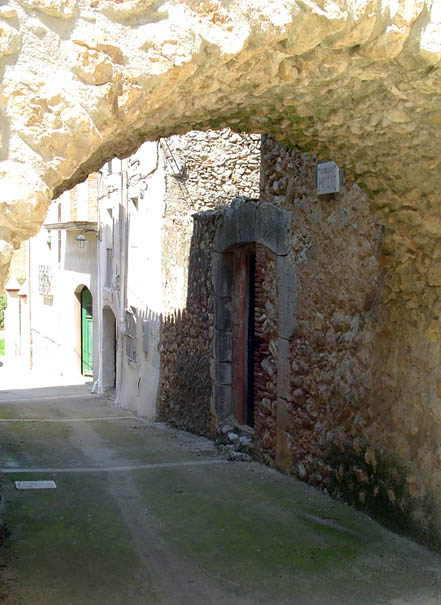
- Common lane in Vilanant

- Coat of arms

- Location in Catalonia Vilanant (Spain)
- Coordinates: 42.254°N 2.890°E
- Country: Spain
- Community: Catalonia
- Province: Girona
- Comarca: Alt Empordà

Government
  - Mayor: Anna Palet Vilaplana (2015)

Area
  - Total: 16.9 km^{2} (6.5 sq mi)
- Elevation: 98 m (322 ft)

Population (2025-01-01)
  - Total: 406
  - Density: 24.0/km^{2} (62.2/sq mi)
- Website: vilanant.cat

Vilanant (Catalan pronunciation: [ˌbiləˈnan]) is a town in the Alt Empordà comarca, in Girona, Catalonia, Spain. It has a population of 328 people.

The municipality covers an area of 17 km² and is located at an average altitude of 98 meters above sea level. Neighboring municipalities are to the north with Llers, to the east with Avinyonet de Puigventós, to the south with Borrassà and Navata and to the west with Cistella.
