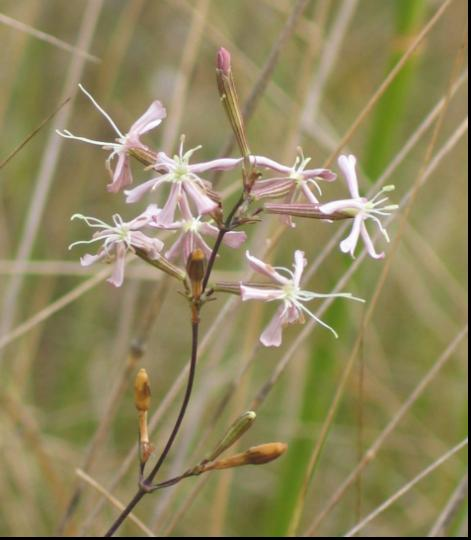

Conservation status
- Endangered (IUCN 3.1)

Scientific classification
- Kingdom: Plantae
- Clade: Tracheophytes
- Clade: Angiosperms
- Clade: Eudicots
- Order: Caryophyllales
- Family: Caryophyllaceae
- Genus: Silene
- Species: S. sennenii

Binomial name
- Silene sennenii Pau

= Silene sennenii =

Species of shrub

Silene sennenii is a species of plant in the family Caryophyllaceae. It is endemic to Spain. Its natural habitat is Mediterranean Matorral shrubland vegetation. Classified as an endangered species by the IUCN, it is threatened by habitat loss.

== Description ==
Silene sennenii is a perennial herb (a hemicryptophyte, with overwintering buds at or just below the soil surface) that produces erect to ascending flowering stems measuring 15–80 cm in height. The leaves are narrow, elliptic to lanceolate, tapering gradually into a small stalk (petiole), and bear fine, non-glandular hairs (i.e. hairs that are not sticky).

Flowering stems terminate in compact clusters called dichasial cymes, each flower borne on a slender, hairless (glabrous) stalk (pedicel) 4–8 mm long and subtended by a small bract shorter than the pedicel. The flowers are radially symmetrical (actinomorphic) and five-parted (pentamerous), with male organs maturing before the female parts (protandrous) to encourage cross-pollination. The corolla is white to pale pink, with petals 7–9 mm long that often fold back under bright sunlight. The calyx is broadly ovate to nearly circular, 13–15 mm long, with a thin, dry (scarious) margin. After flowering, the plant forms ovoid capsules 8–9 mm long and 4–5 mm wide, each containing 40–70 smooth seeds measuring 0.9–1 × 1–1.3 mm.

== Habitat and distribution ==
Silene sennenii is restricted to lowland fenassars (community Brachypodietum phoenicoidis), a grassland type typically found on the margins of arable fields, roadside embankments and, less commonly, in abandoned cultivation at elevations of 15–100 metres. These fenassars are dominated by coarse grasses and support a sparse cover of forbs; S. sennenii occurs on bare patches or in lightly disturbed soil, often among companion species such as field eryngo (Eryngium campestre), Spanish oat-grass (Avena barbata), wild carrot (Daucus carota), wild fennel (Foeniculum vulgare), and small-flowered catchfly (Silene vulgaris).

This species is strictly endemic to the Alt Empordà comarca of Catalonia, Spain, where it is known from five extant localities in the vicinity of Figueres. Populations occupy 13 one-kilometre UTM squares, with over 70 per cent of the global population centred at the 18th-century Sant Ferran Castle. Several eastern populations (e.g. Riumors, Fortià, Fortianell) appear to have been extirpated. A comprehensive census conducted in 2008 recorded 4,308 mature individuals in total.
