= Siurana =

Siurana may refer to a number of villages in Catalonia:

- Siurana (Tarragona)
- Siurana, Alt Empordà
