= Ordis =

- Municipality
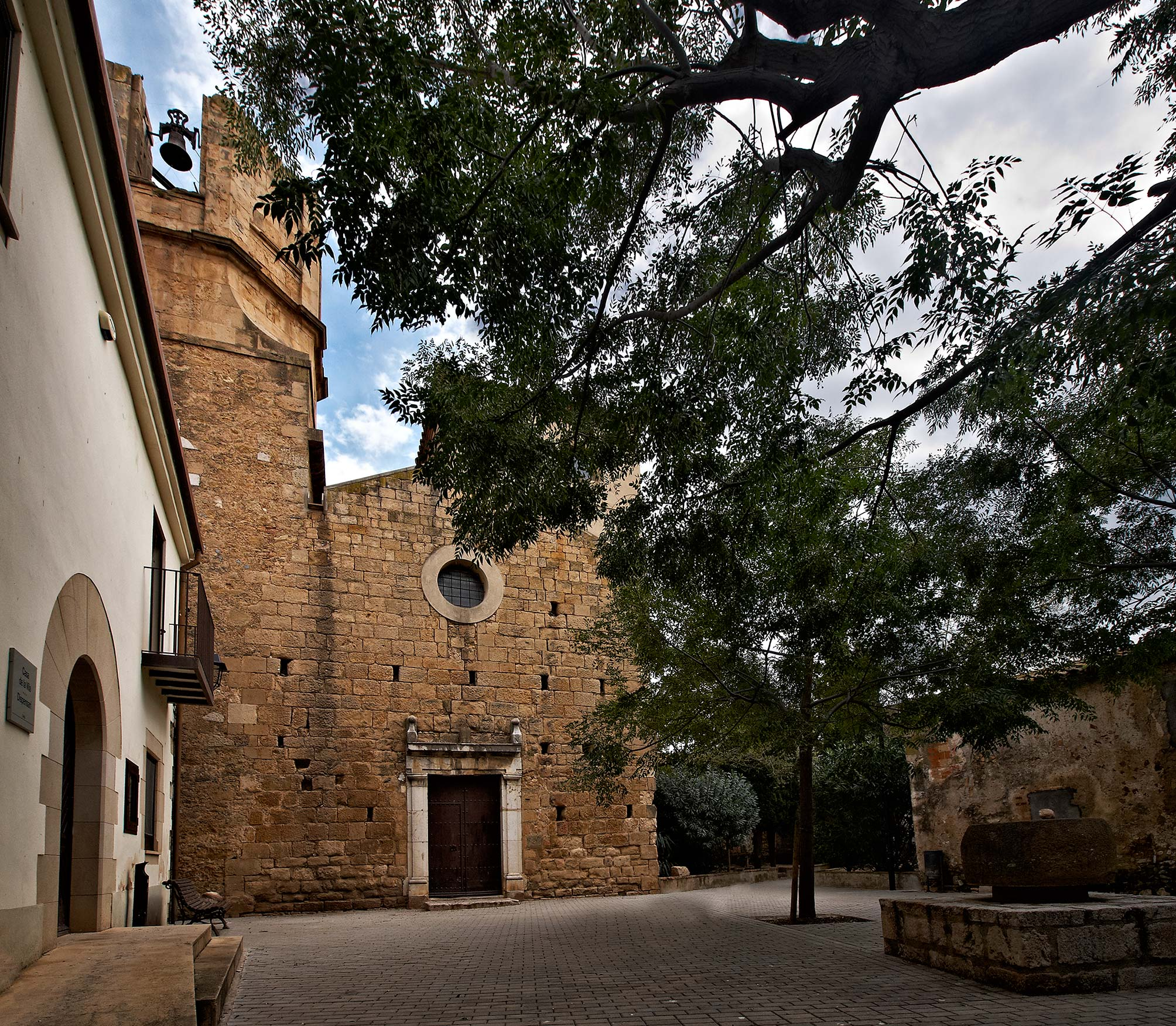
- Ordis church

- Flag Coat of arms

- Location in Catalonia Ordis (Spain)
- Coordinates: 42°13′1″N 2°54′31″E
- Country: Spain
- Community: Catalonia
- Province: Girona
- Comarca: Alt Empordà

Government
  - Mayor: Anna Maria Torrentà Costa (2015)

Area
  - Total: 8.6 km^{2} (3.3 sq mi)
- Elevation: 98 m (322 ft)

Population (2025-01-01)
  - Total: 409
  - Density: 48/km^{2} (120/sq mi)
- Demonym: Ordienc
- Website: www.ordis.cat

Ordis (Catalan pronunciation: [ˈɔɾðis]) is a municipality in the comarca of Alt Empordà, Girona, Catalonia, Spain.
