= Pau, Spain =

Pau
- Municipality
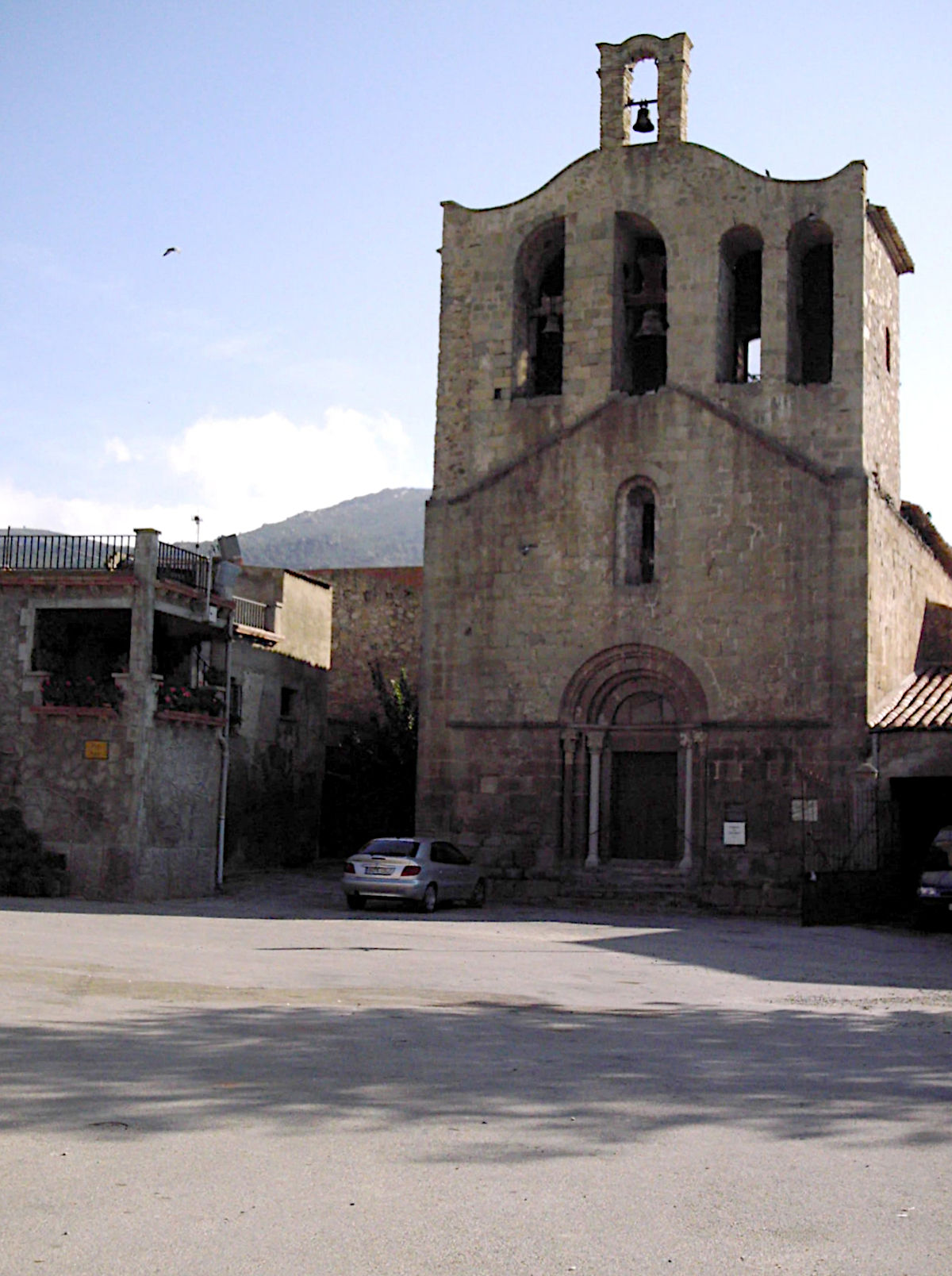
- St. Martin's church

- Flag Coat of arms

- Location in Catalonia Pau (Spain)
- Coordinates: 42°19′N 3°7′E
- Country: Spain
- Community: Catalonia
- Province: Girona
- Comarca: Alt Empordà

Government
  - Mayor: Jaume Isern Ruiz (2023)

Area
  - Total: 10.7 km^{2} (4.1 sq mi)

Population (2025-01-01)
  - Total: 560
  - Density: 52/km^{2} (140/sq mi)
- Website: www.pau.cat

Pau (Catalan pronunciation: [ˈpaw]) is a municipality in the comarca of Alt Empordà, Girona, Catalonia, Spain.
