= Lladó =

- Municipality
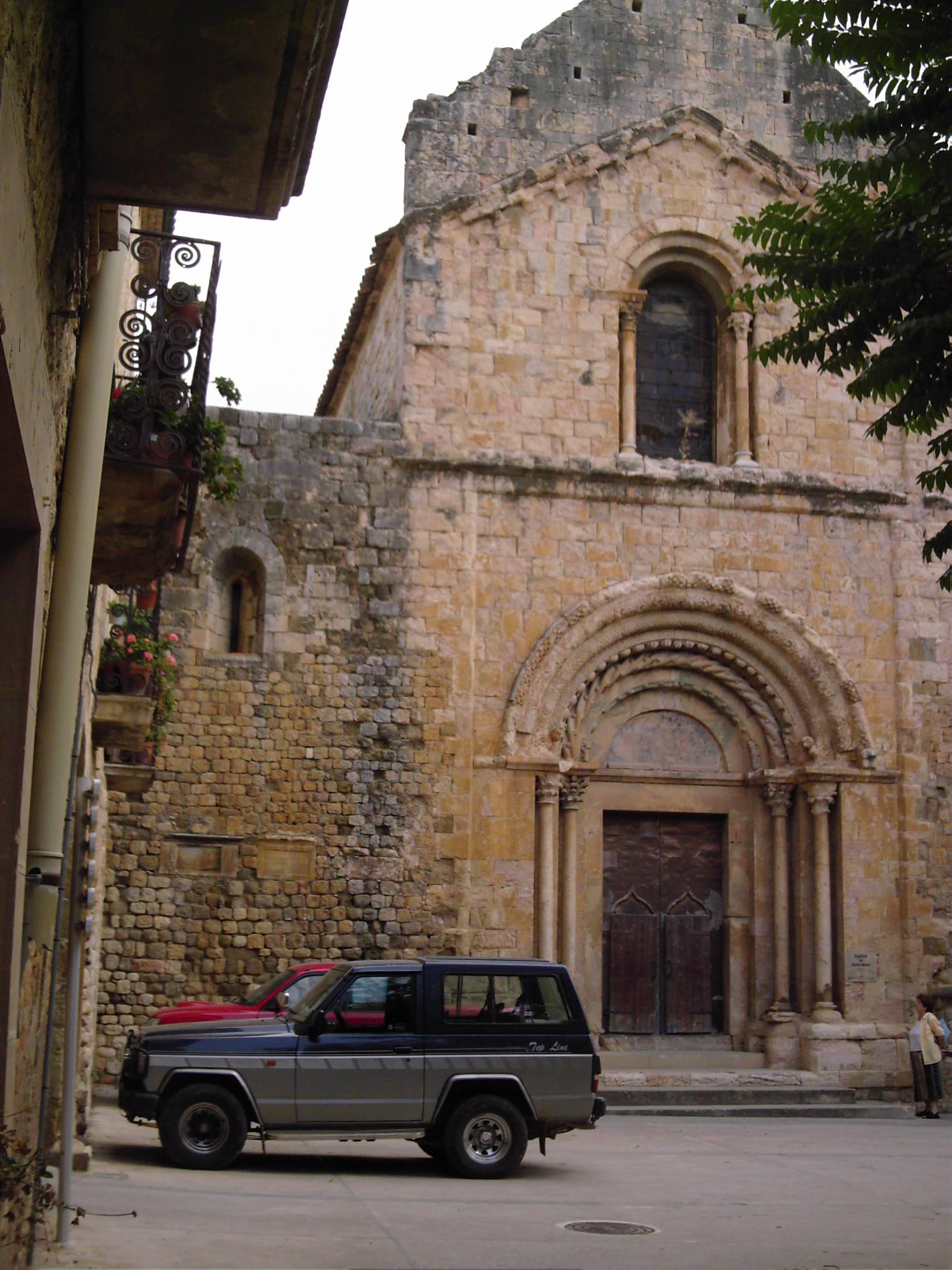

- Location in Catalonia Lladó (Spain)
- Coordinates: 42°15′N 2°49′E
- Country: Spain
- Community: Catalonia
- Province: Girona
- Comarca: Alt Empordà

Government
  - Mayor: Juan Fàbrega Solé (2015)

Area
  - Total: 13.5 km^{2} (5.2 sq mi)

Population (2025-01-01)
  - Total: 822
  - Density: 60.9/km^{2} (158/sq mi)
- Website: llado.cat

Lladó (Catalan pronunciation: [ʎəˈðo]; also known as Lledó d'Empordà pronounced [ʎəˈðo ðəmpuˈɾða]) is a municipality in the comarca of Alt Empordà, Girona, Catalonia, Spain.

It is a village with an eleventh century Augustinian Monastery and a Romanesque church.

== History ==
The first documentation of Lladó is dating from 977 year, and it was done on the donation of some vineyard and lands from the Count and Bishop Miró to the Sant Pere de Rodes monastery.

In 1089 the cult and monastic life is restored on the Santa Maria de Lladó church and from that moment, the village life grows around it.
