= Capmany =

- Municipality
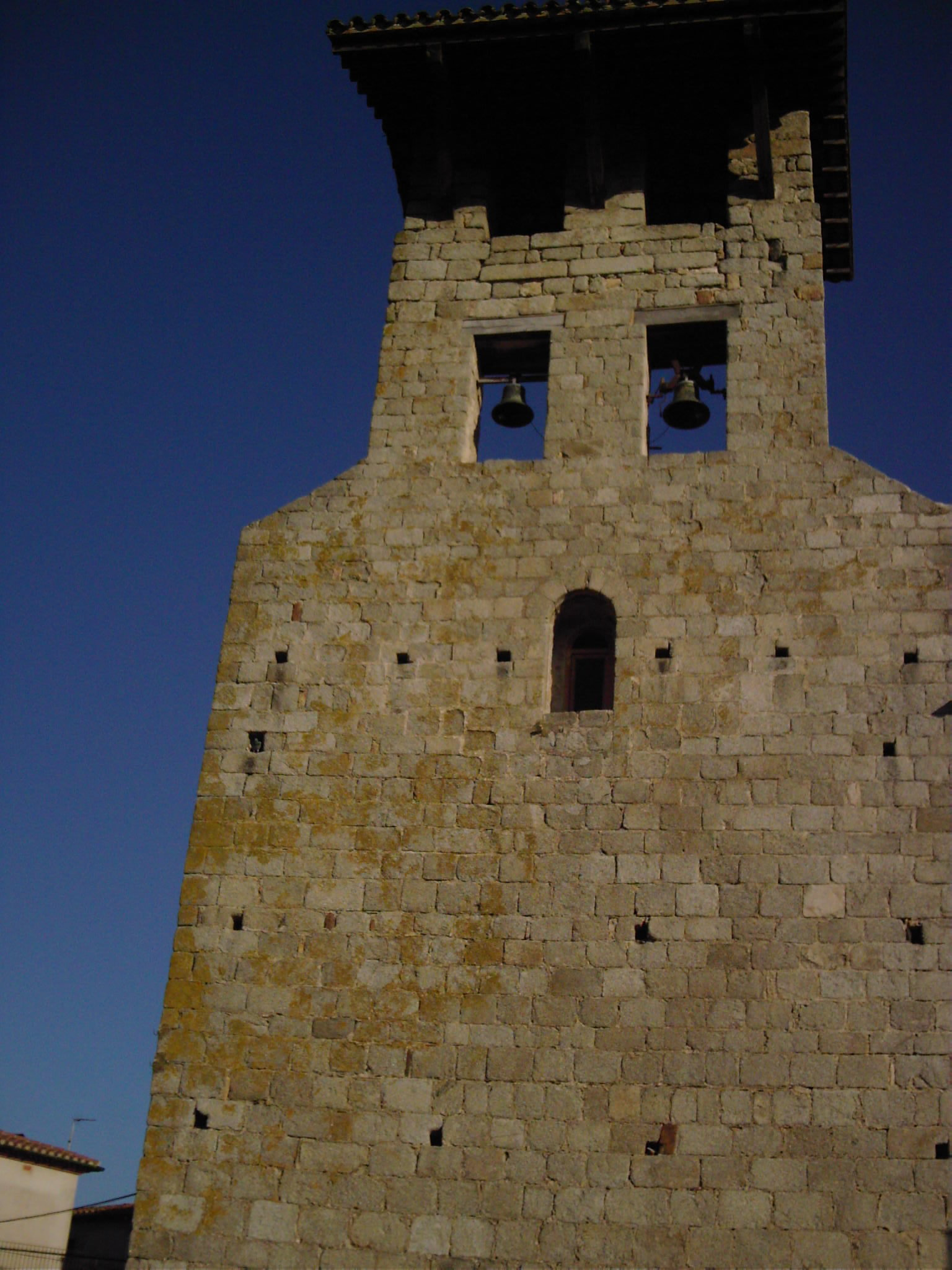
- St. Agatha's church tower, Capmany

- Flag Coat of arms

- Location in Catalonia Capmany (Catalonia)
- Coordinates: 42°22′N 2°55′E
- Country: Spain
- Community: Catalonia
- Province: Girona
- Comarca: Alt Empordà

Government
  - Mayor: Joan Fuentes Pomés (2015)

Area
  - Total: 26.4 km^{2} (10.2 sq mi)

Population (2025-01-01)
  - Total: 680
  - Density: 26/km^{2} (67/sq mi)
- Website: www.capmany.cat

Capmany (Catalan pronunciation: [ˌkamˈmaɲ]) or Campmany is a village and municipality in the comarca of Alt Empordà, Girona, Catalonia, Spain.

The earliest recorded name for the village is Campmany, derived from the Latin Campus Magnus meaning "big field", but this became corrupted into Capmany ("big head") which is now the official name of the village, though the name Campmany is also commonly used.
