= Vilamalla =

- Municipality
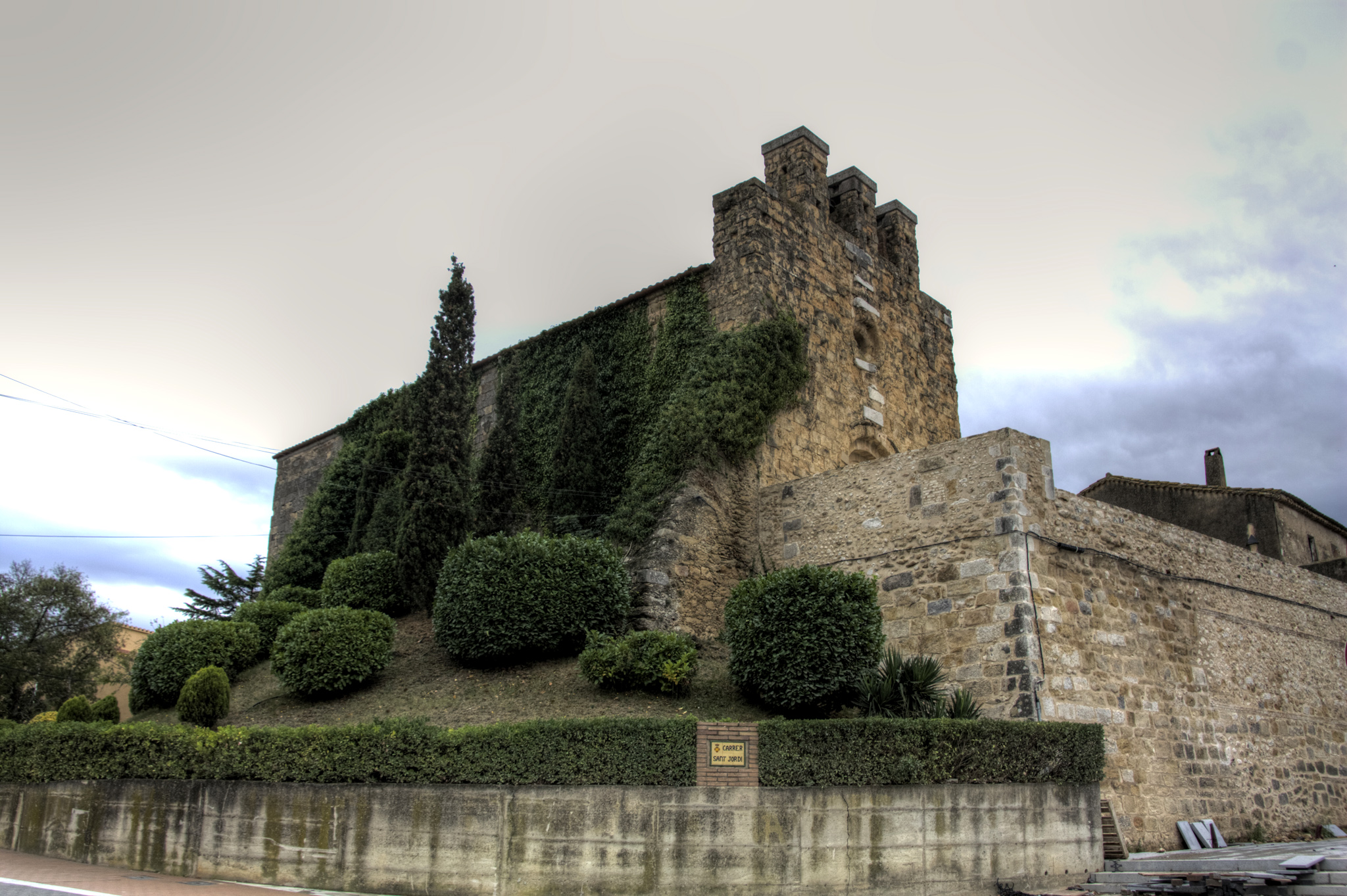
- St. Vincent's church, Vilamalla

- Flag Coat of arms

- Location in Catalonia Vilamalla (Spain)
- Coordinates: 42°13′N 2°58′E
- Country: Spain
- Community: Catalonia
- Province: Girona
- Comarca: Alt Empordà

Government
  - Mayor: Carles Alvarez Gonzalez (2015)

Area
  - Total: 8.8 km^{2} (3.4 sq mi)

Population (2025-01-01)
  - Total: 1,205
  - Density: 140/km^{2} (350/sq mi)
- Website: www.vilamalla.cat

Vilamalla (Catalan pronunciation: [ˌbiləˈmaʎə]) is a municipality in the comarca of Alt Empordà, Girona, Catalonia, Spain.
