= Biure =

- Municipality
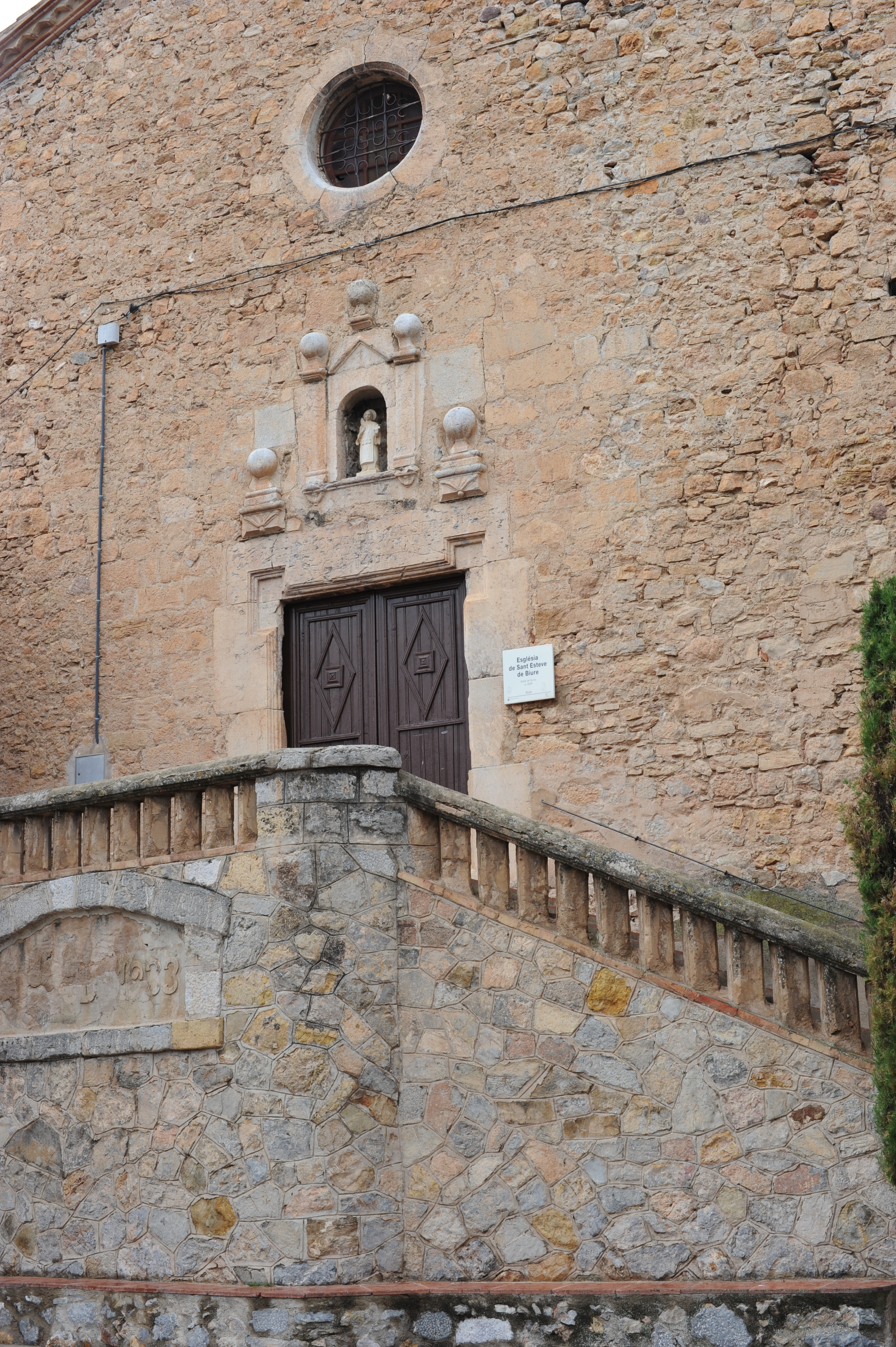

- Coat of arms

- Location in Catalonia Biure (Spain)
- Coordinates: 42°20′24″N 2°53′46″E
- Country: Spain
- Community: Catalonia
- Province: Girona
- Comarca: Alt Empordà

Government
  - Mayor: Martí Sans Pairutó (2015)

Area
  - Total: 10.0 km^{2} (3.9 sq mi)
- Elevation: 81 m (266 ft)

Population (2025-01-01)
  - Total: 226
  - Density: 22.6/km^{2} (58.5/sq mi)
- Demonym(s): Biurenc, biurenca
- Website: www.biure.cat

Biure (Catalan pronunciation: [ˈbiwɾə]) is a municipality in the comarca of the Alt Empordà in Girona, Catalonia, Spain. It is situated to the north-west of Figueres, to which it is linked by the GE-504 road.

== Demography ==
| 1900 | 1930 | 1950 | 1970 | 1986 | 2007 |
|---|---|---|---|---|---|
| 1037 | 827 | 591 | 359 | 284 | 245 |
