= Viladamat =

- Municipality
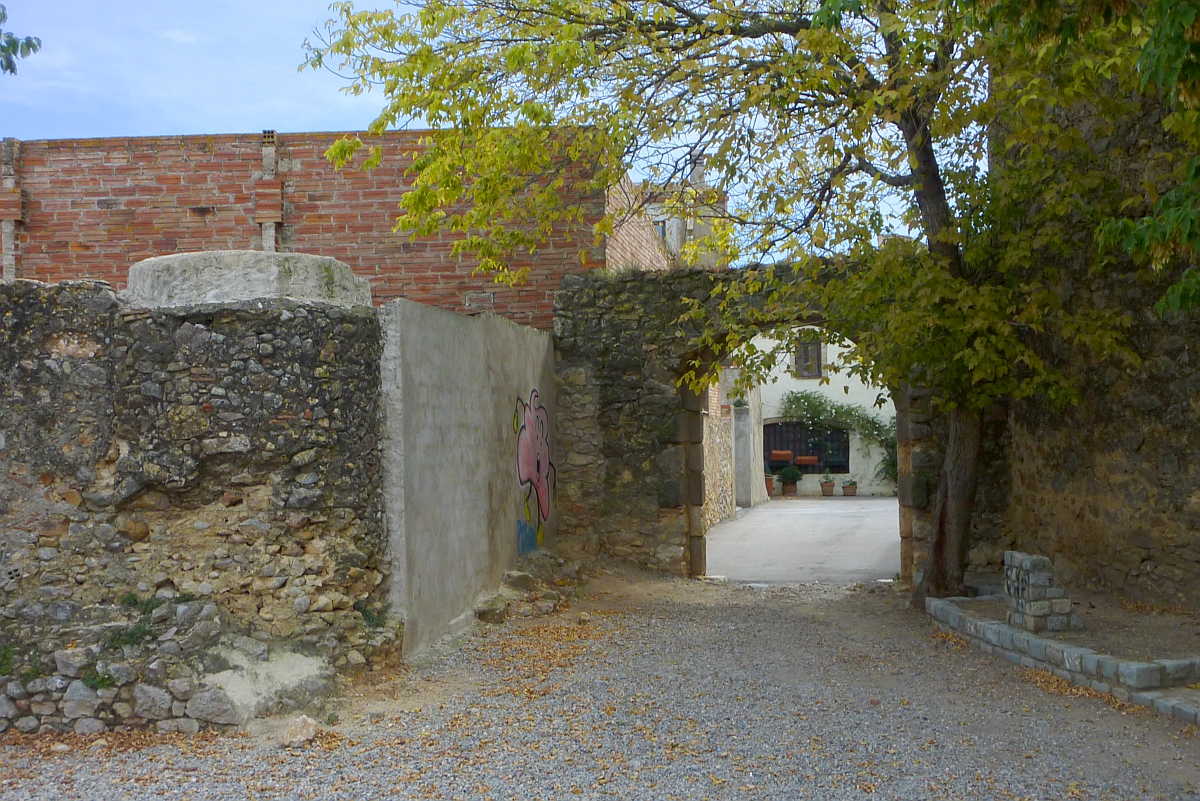

- Coat of arms

- Location in Catalonia Viladamat (Spain)
- Coordinates: 42.135°N 3.076°E
- Country: Spain
- Community: Catalonia
- Province: Girona
- Comarca: Alt Empordà

Government
  - Mayor: Robert Sabater Costa (2015)

Area
  - Total: 11.7 km^{2} (4.5 sq mi)

Population (2025-01-01)
  - Total: 500
  - Density: 43/km^{2} (110/sq mi)
- Website: www.viladamat.cat

Viladamat (Catalan pronunciation: [ˌbiləðəˈmat]) is a village of Alt Empordà, 6 kilometers to the north from l'Escala, a municipality in Catalonia, Spain.

== Archaeology ==
South of Vildamat lies the ancient site of Tolegassos, characterized as a small villa. It was inhabited from the 1st century to the early 3rd century AD.
