= Palau de Santa Eulàlia =

- Municipality
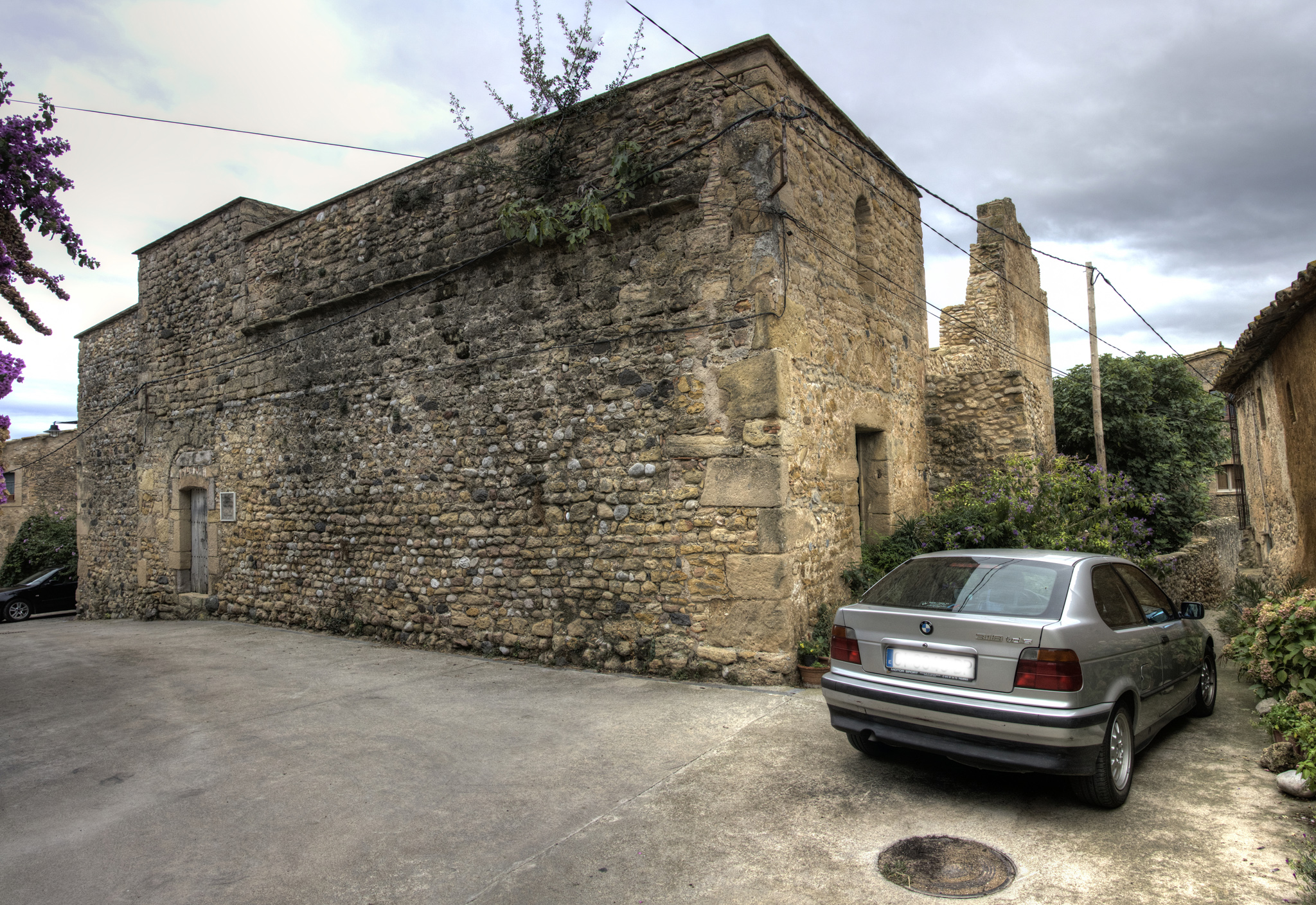
- Palau Sardiaca

- Flag Coat of arms

- Location in Catalonia Palau de Santa Eulàlia (Spain)
- Coordinates: 42.174°N 2.9655°E
- Country: Spain
- Community: Catalonia
- Province: Girona
- Comarca: Alt Empordà

Government
  - Mayor: Xavier Camps Comas (2015)

Area
  - Total: 8.4 km^{2} (3.2 sq mi)

Population (2025-01-01)
  - Total: 124
  - Density: 15/km^{2} (38/sq mi)
- Website: www.palaudesantaeulalia.cat

Palau de Santa Eulàlia (Catalan pronunciation: [pəˈlaw ðə ˌsantəwˈlaliə]) is a municipality in the comarca of Alt Empordà, Girona, Catalonia, Spain.
