= L'Armentera =

- Municipality
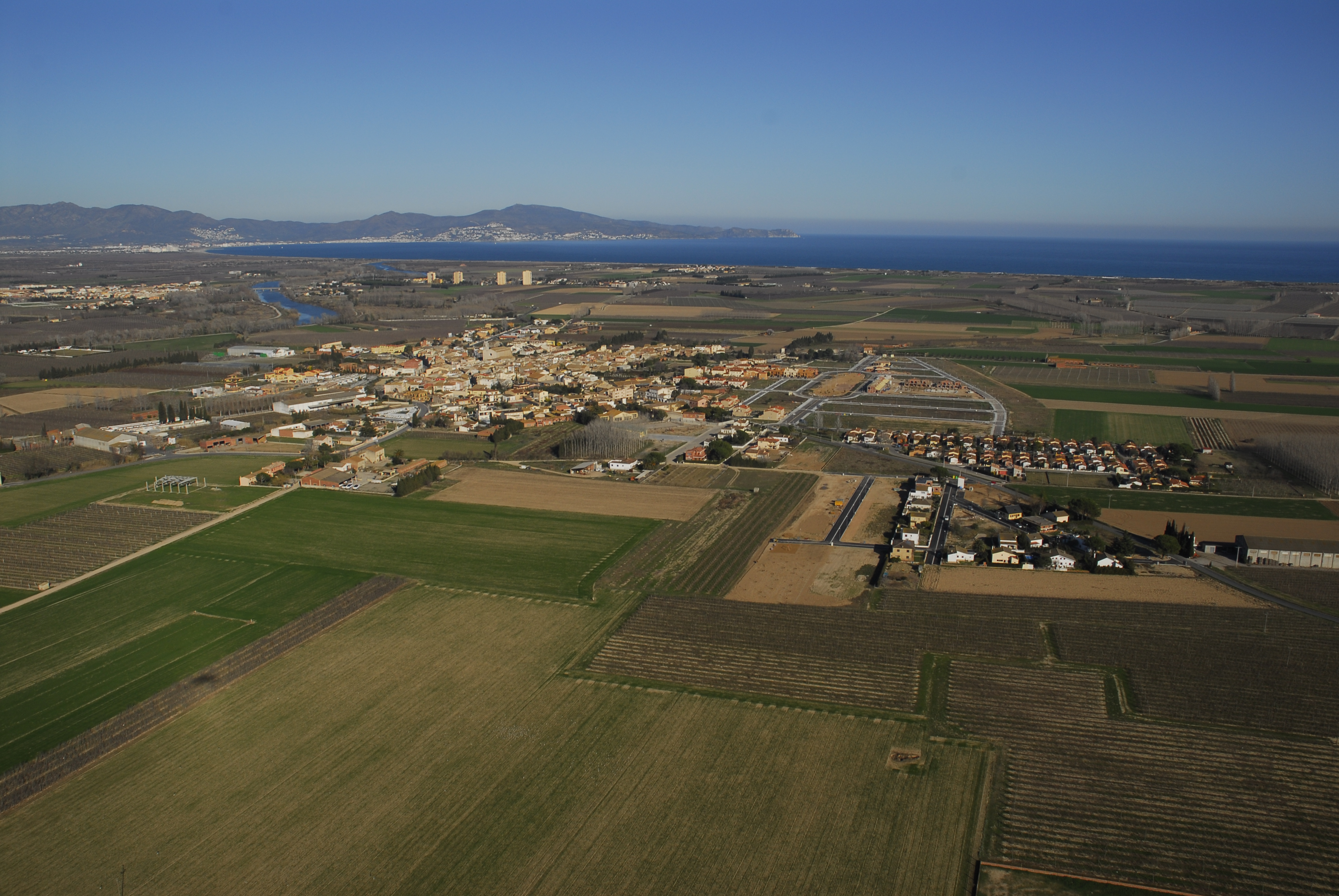
- L'Armentera

- Flag Coat of arms

- Location in Catalonia L'Armentera (Spain)
- Coordinates: 42.174°N 3.076°E
- Country: Spain
- Community: Catalonia
- Province: Girona
- Comarca: Alt Empordà

Government
  - Mayor: Marc Casadevall Nadal (2023–2027)

Area
  - Total: 5.6 km^{2} (2.2 sq mi)

Population (2025-01-01)
  - Total: 1,080
  - Density: 190/km^{2} (500/sq mi)
- Postal code: 17002
- Website: www.armentera.cat

L'Armentera (Catalan pronunciation: [ləɾmənˈteɾə]) is a municipality in the comarca of Alt Empordà, Girona, Catalonia, Spain, on the coastline of the Costa Brava.
