= Mollet de Peralada =

- Municipality
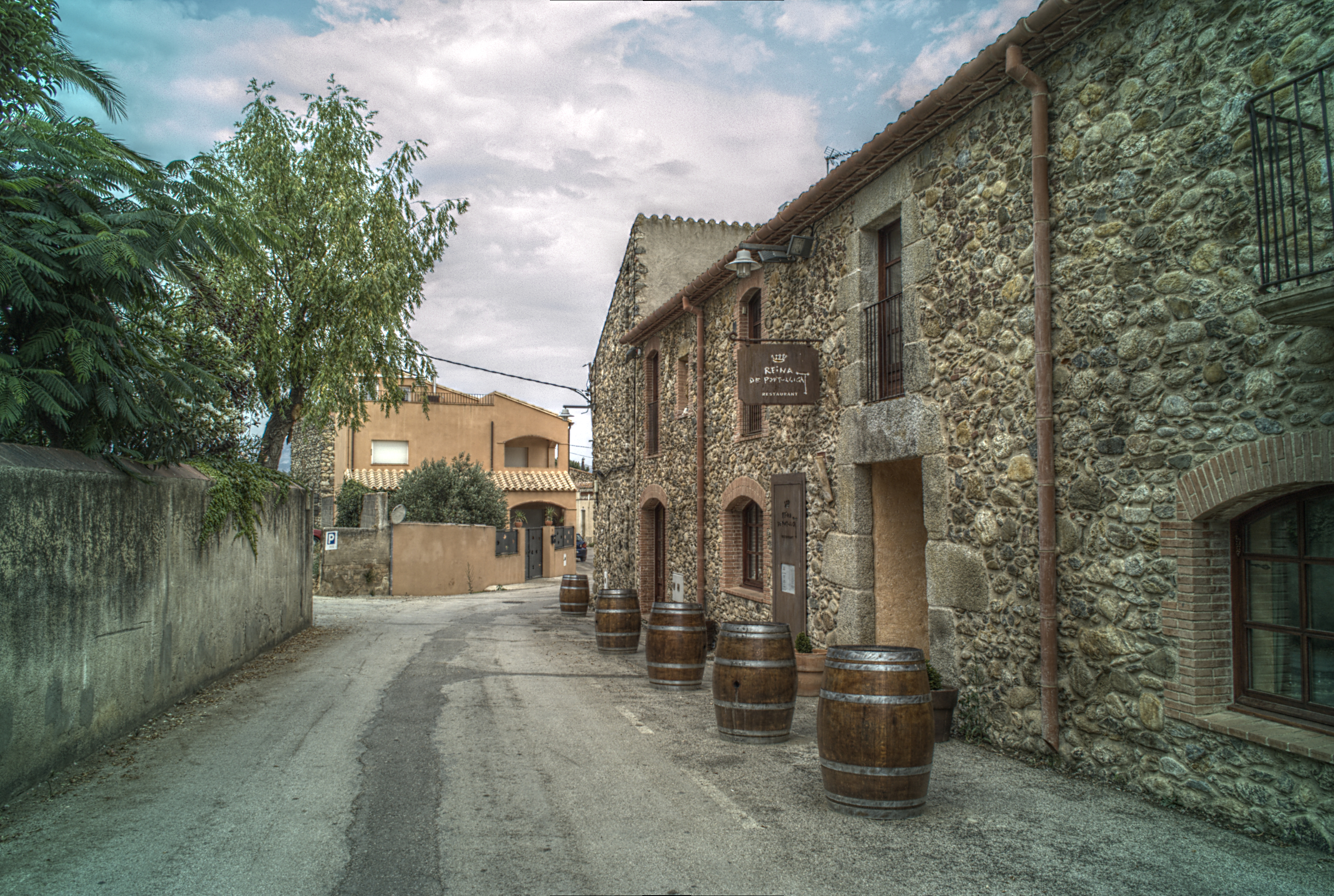

- Location in Catalonia Mollet de Peralada (Spain)
- Coordinates: 42°21′N 3°0′E
- Country: Spain
- Community: Catalonia
- Province: Girona
- Comarca: Alt Empordà

Government
  - Mayor: Josep Cristina Llansó (2015)

Area
  - Total: 6.0 km^{2} (2.3 sq mi)

Population (2025-01-01)
  - Total: 202
  - Density: 34/km^{2} (87/sq mi)
- Website: www.molletperalada.cat

Mollet de Peralada (Catalan pronunciation: [muˈʎɛd də pəɾəˈlaðə]) is a municipality in the comarca of Alt Empordà, Girona, Catalonia, Spain. It is split into two parts, the north-western part containing most of the population.
