= Albanyà =

- Municipality
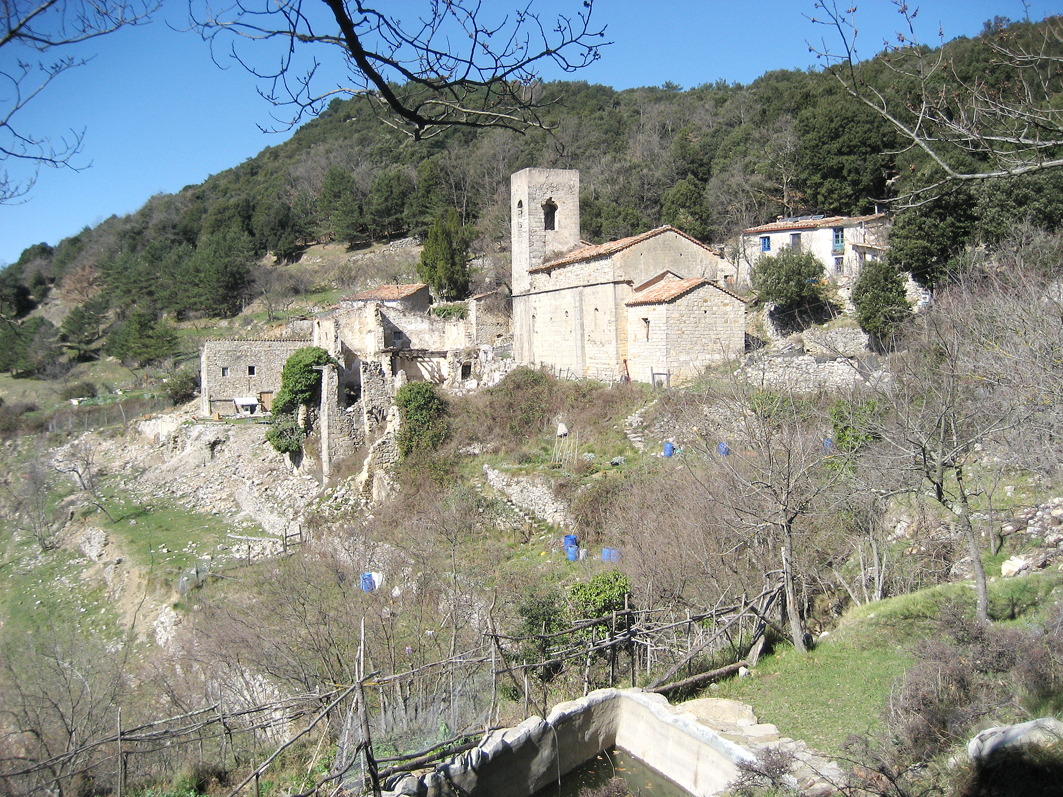
- Lliurona, village in Albanyà

- Flag Coat of arms

- Location in Catalonia Albanyà (Spain)
- Coordinates: 42.307°N 2.723°E
- Country: Spain
- Community: Catalonia
- Province: Girona
- Comarca: Alt Empordà

Government
  - Mayor: Joan Fàbregas Jordà (2015)

Area
  - Total: 94.4 km^{2} (36.4 sq mi)

Population (2025-01-01)
  - Total: 157
  - Density: 1.66/km^{2} (4.31/sq mi)
- Website: www.albanya.cat

Albanyà (Catalan pronunciation: [əlβəˈɲa]) is a municipality in the comarca of Alt Empordà, Girona, Catalonia, Spain.
