= Saus, Camallera i Llampaies =

- Municipality
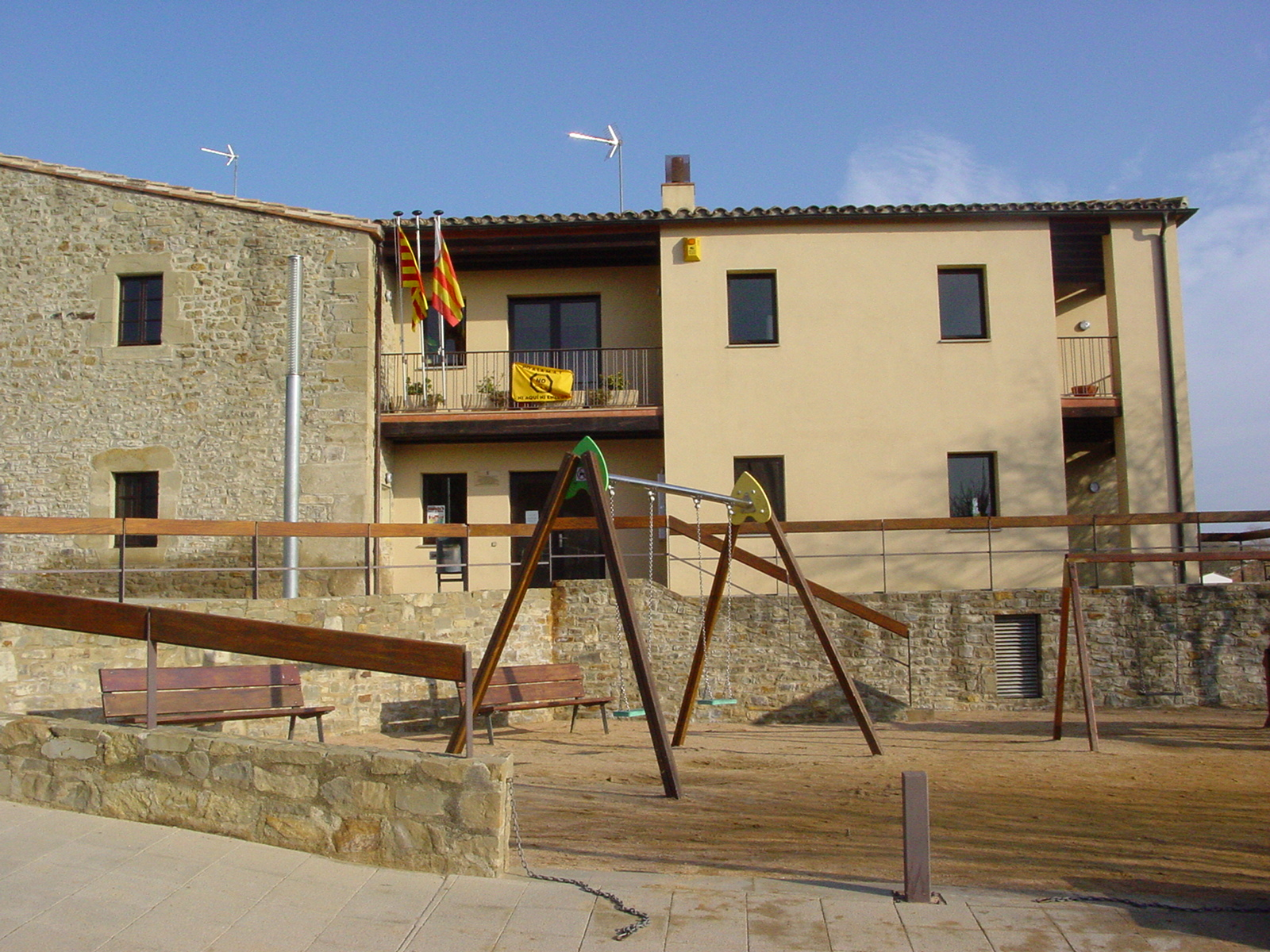
- Town hall, Camallera

- Flag Coat of arms

- Location in Catalonia
- Coordinates: 42°7′30″N 2°57′54″E
- Country: Spain
- Community: Catalonia
- Province: Girona
- Comarca: Alt Empordà

Government
  - Mayor: Esteve Gironés Hernández (2015)

Area
  - Total: 11.4 km^{2} (4.4 sq mi)
- Elevation: 86 m (282 ft)

Population (2025-01-01)
  - Total: 897
  - Density: 78.7/km^{2} (204/sq mi)
- Demonym(s): Camallerenc, camallerenca sausenc, sausenca
- Website: ajuntamentdesaus.com

Saus, Camallera i Llampaies (Catalan pronunciation: [ˈsaws kəməˈʎeɾəj ʎəmˈpajəs]) is a municipality in the comarca of Alt Empordà, province of Girona, Catalonia, Spain. Camallera is the largest village, as well as the capital of the municipal area. The municipality's name came from the village of Saus, which was formally the most important village in its area.
