= La Selva de Mar =

- Municipality
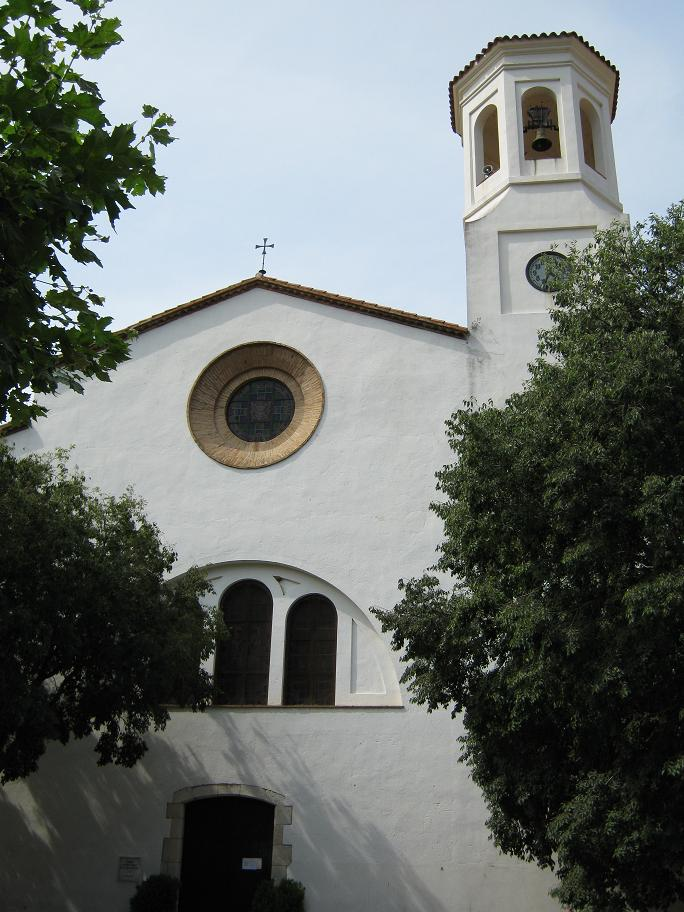
- St. Stephen's church, la Selva de Mar

- Coat of arms

- Location in Catalonia La Selva de Mar (Spain)
- Coordinates: 42°19′25″N 3°11′20″E
- Country: Spain
- Community: Catalonia
- Province: Girona
- Comarca: Alt Empordà

Government
  - Mayor: Carles Buscató Sansballo (2015)

Area
  - Total: 7.2 km^{2} (2.8 sq mi)

Population (2025-01-01)
  - Total: 223
  - Density: 31/km^{2} (80/sq mi)
- Website: www.selvamar.cat

La Selva de Mar (Catalan pronunciation: [lə ˈsɛlβə ðə ˈmaɾ]) is a municipality in the comarca of Alt Empordà in Catalonia, Spain. It is quite small with a population of about 197. The nearest town is El Port de la Selva, a common destination for beach-going tourists.
