= Pontós =

- Municipality
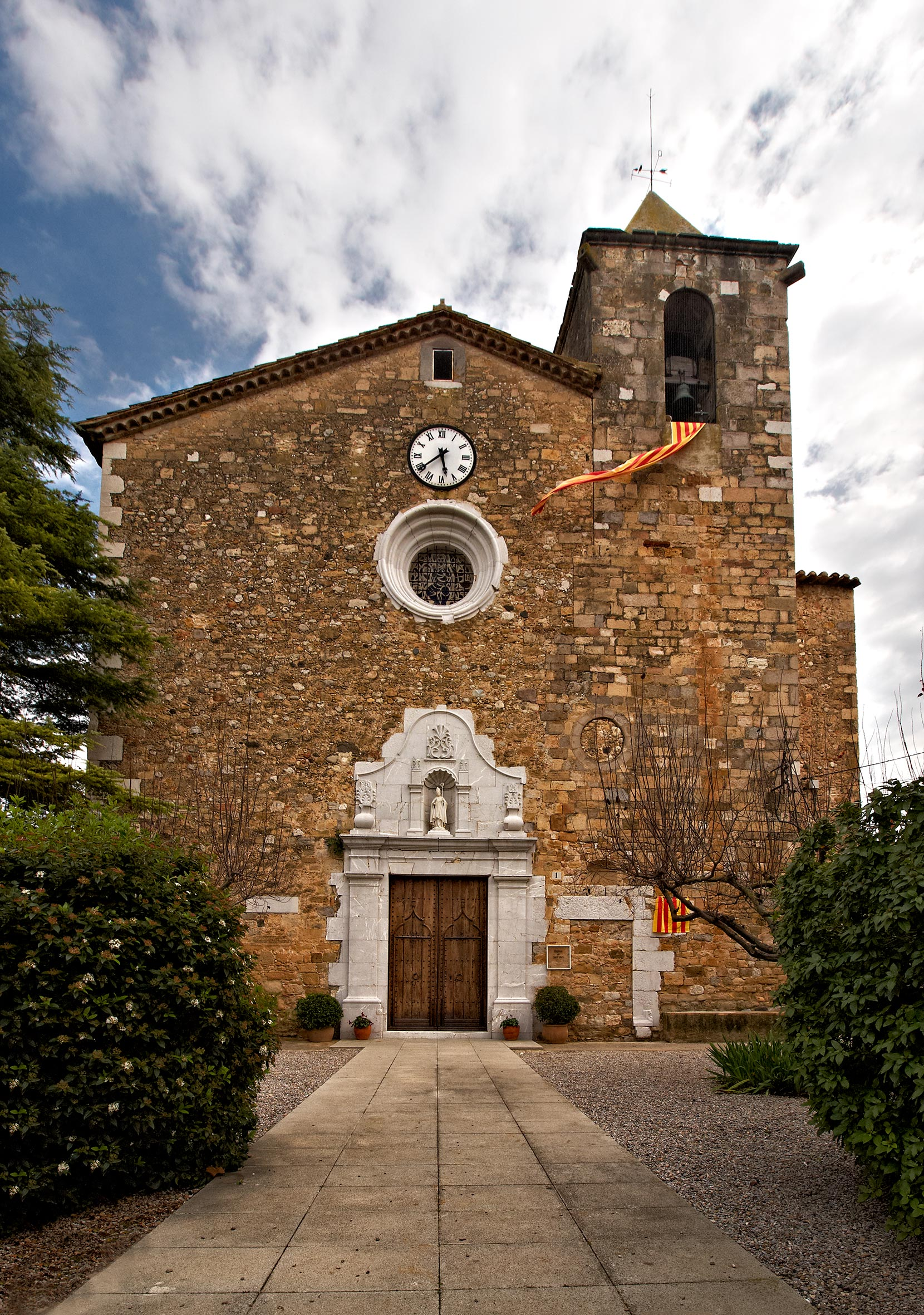
- St. Martin's church, Pontós

- Coat of arms

- Location in Catalonia Pontós (Spain)
- Coordinates: 42°11′N 2°55′E
- Country: Spain
- Community: Catalonia
- Province: Girona
- Comarca: Alt Empordà

Government
  - Mayor: Jaume Prats Simon (2015)

Area
  - Total: 13.7 km^{2} (5.3 sq mi)

Population (2025-01-01)
  - Total: 296
  - Density: 21.6/km^{2} (56.0/sq mi)
- Website: www.pontos.cat

Pontós (Catalan pronunciation: [punˈtos]) is a municipality in the comarca of Alt Empordà, Girona, Catalonia, Spain.
