= Garrigàs =

- Municipality
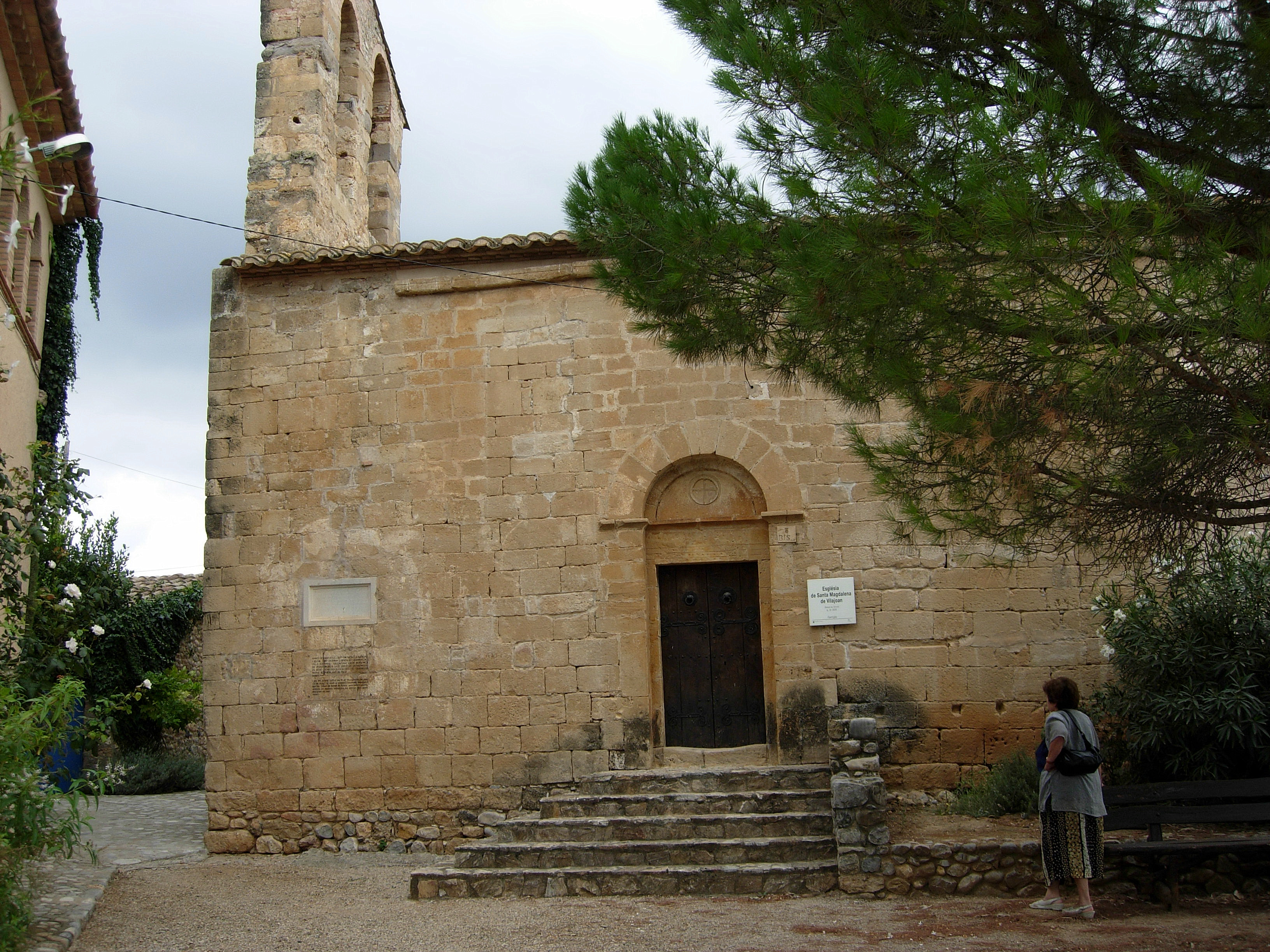
- Santa Maria d'Ermadàs

- Flag Coat of arms

- Location in Catalonia Garrigàs (Spain)
- Coordinates: 42.195°N 2.955°E
- Country: Spain
- Community: Catalonia
- Province: Girona
- Comarca: Alt Empordà

Government
  - Mayor: Josep M. Masoliver Subirós (2015)

Area
  - Total: 19.9 km^{2} (7.7 sq mi)

Population (2025-01-01)
  - Total: 480
  - Density: 24/km^{2} (62/sq mi)
- Website: webspobles2.ddgi.cat/garrigas

Garrigàs (Catalan pronunciation: [gəriˈɣas]) is a municipality in the comarca of Alt Empordà, Girona, Catalonia, Spain.
