= Colera =

- Municipality
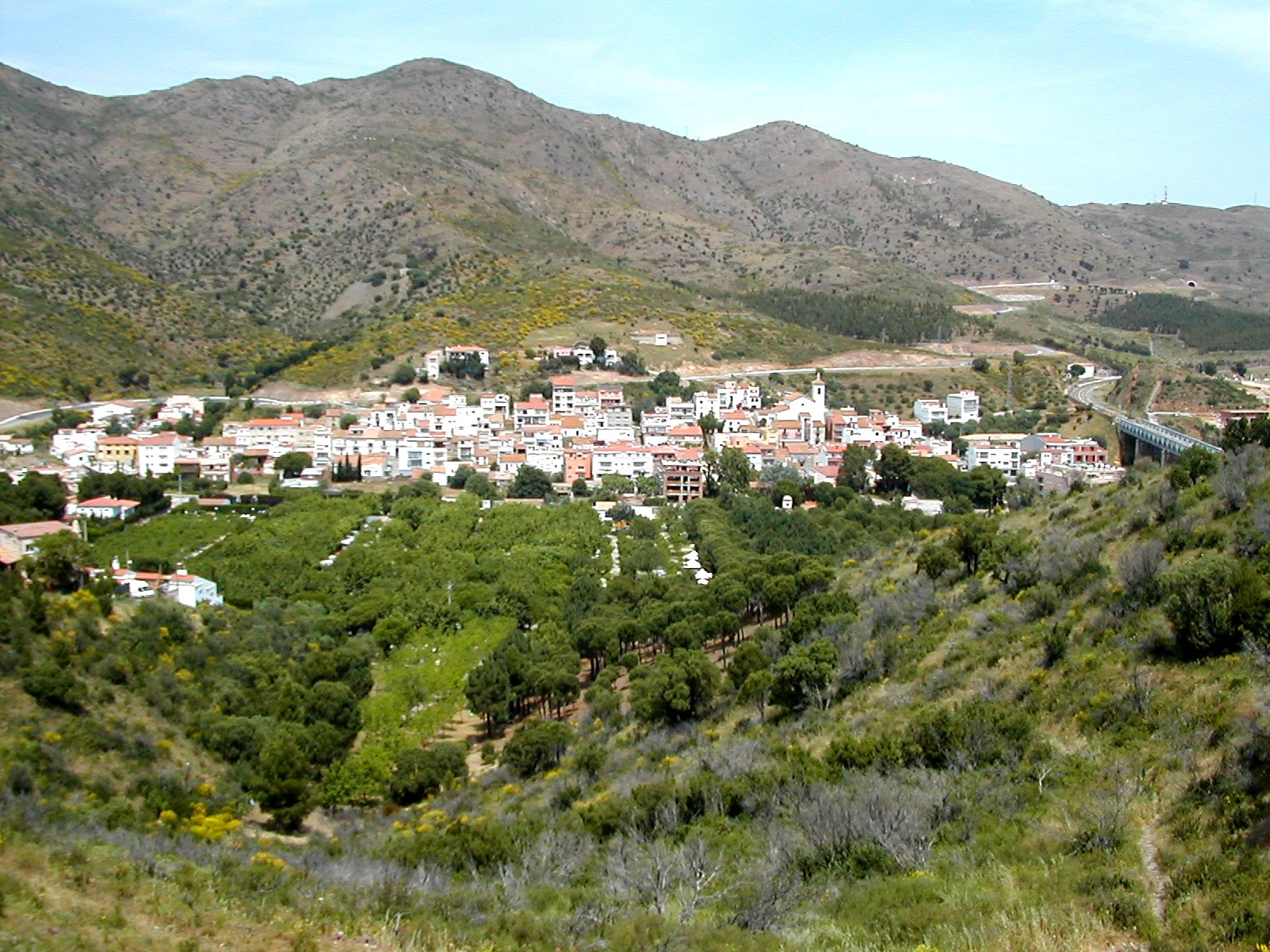

- Coat of arms

- Location in Catalonia Colera (Spain)
- Coordinates: 42°24′N 3°9′E
- Country: Spain
- Community: Catalonia
- Province: Girona
- Comarca: Alt Empordà

Government
  - Mayor: Lluís Bosch Rebarter (2015)

Area
  - Total: 24.4 km^{2} (9.4 sq mi)

Population (2025-01-01)
  - Total: 494
  - Density: 20.2/km^{2} (52.4/sq mi)
- Website: www.colera.cat

Colera (Catalan pronunciation: [kuˈleɾə]) is a municipality in the comarca of Alt Empordà, Girona, Catalonia, Spain, on the Costa Brava. It is a village on the coast with an economy primarily based on tourism. It has several beaches within its vicinity including: Garbet, Burro, Atzuzenes, Portes, Morts la d'en Goixa, and Rovellada.
