= Palau-saverdera =

- Municipality
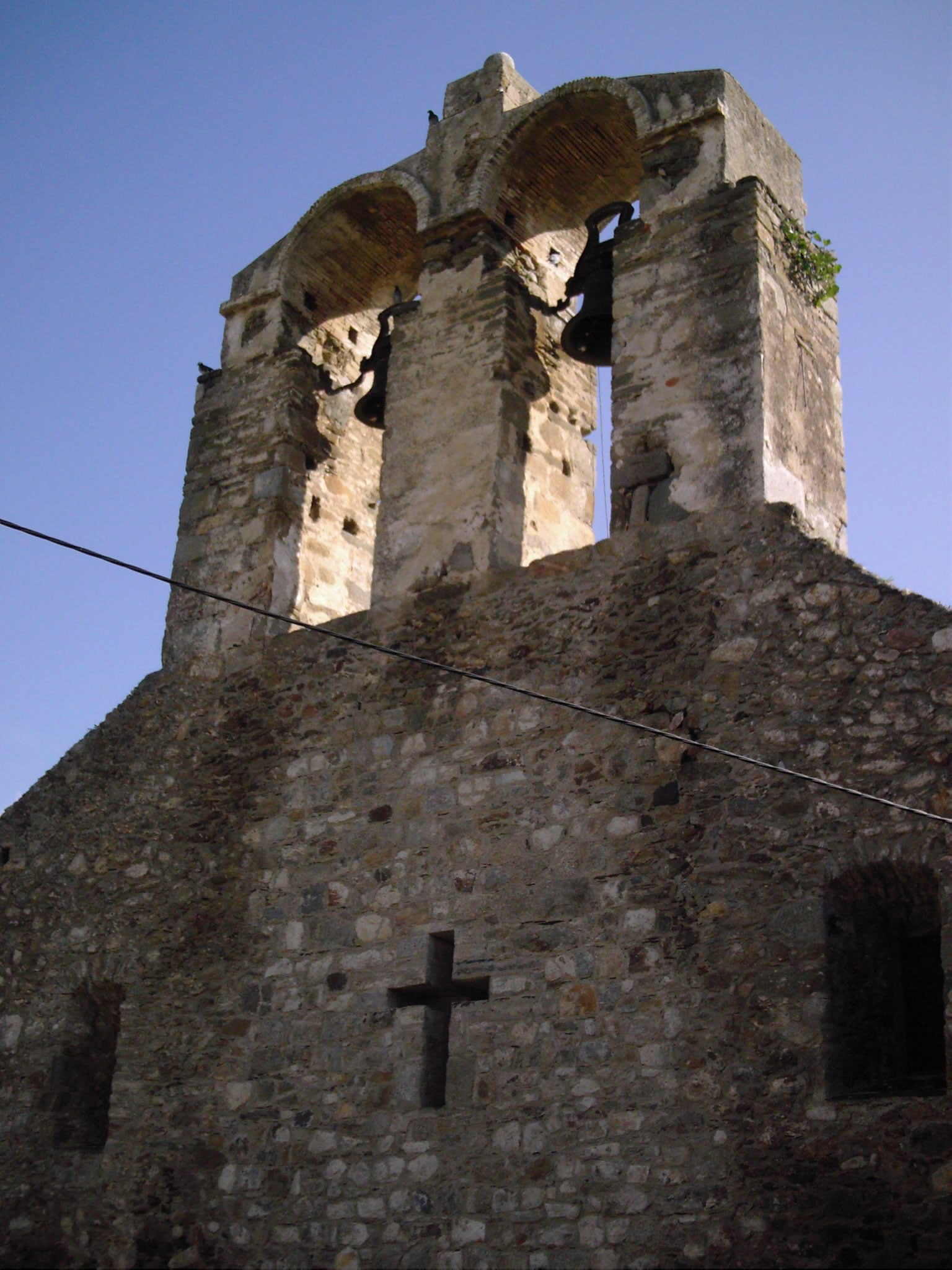
- Church of Saint John

- Flag Coat of arms

- Location in Catalonia Palau-saverdera (Spain)
- Coordinates: 42.3°N 3.15°E
- Country: Spain
- Community: Catalonia
- Province: Girona
- Comarca: Alt Empordà

Government
  - Mayor: Isabel Maria Cortada Soler (2015)

Area
  - Total: 16.4 km^{2} (6.3 sq mi)

Population (2025-01-01)
  - Total: 1,535
  - Density: 93.6/km^{2} (242/sq mi)
- Website: palausaverdera.cat

Palau-saverdera (Old Catalan for 'Palace-[Castle of] the Verdera'; (Catalan pronunciation: [pəˌlawsəβəɾˈðeɾə]) is a municipality in the comarca of Alt Empordà, Girona, Catalonia, Spain.
