= Cabanelles =

- Municipality
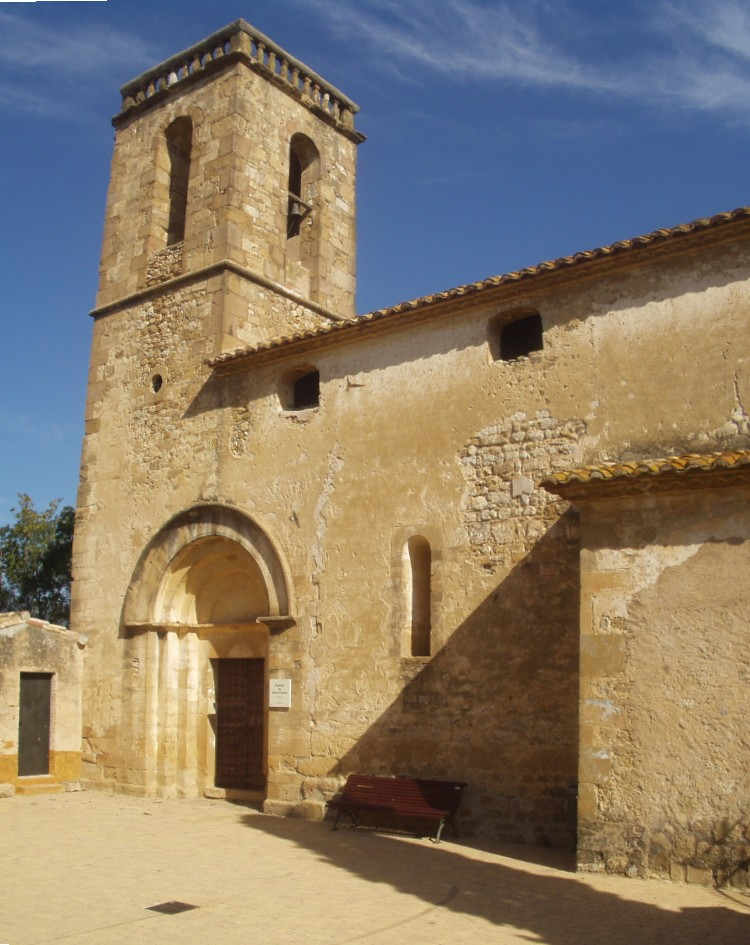
- Church of Santa Coloma in Cabanelles

- Coat of arms

- Location in Catalonia Cabanelles (Spain)
- Coordinates: 42°13′56″N 2°49′14″E
- Country: Spain
- Community: Catalonia
- Province: Girona
- Comarca: Alt Empordà

Government
  - Mayor: Martí Espigulé Vallmajó (2015)

Area
  - Total: 55.6 km^{2} (21.5 sq mi)

Population (2025-01-01)
  - Total: 286
  - Density: 5.14/km^{2} (13.3/sq mi)
- Website: www.cabanelles.cat

Cabanelles (Catalan pronunciation: [kəβəˈneʎəs]) is a municipality in the comarca of Alt Empordà, Girona, Catalonia, Spain. The municipality includes a small exclave to the south-east.
