= Cabanes, Girona =

Cabanes
- Municipality
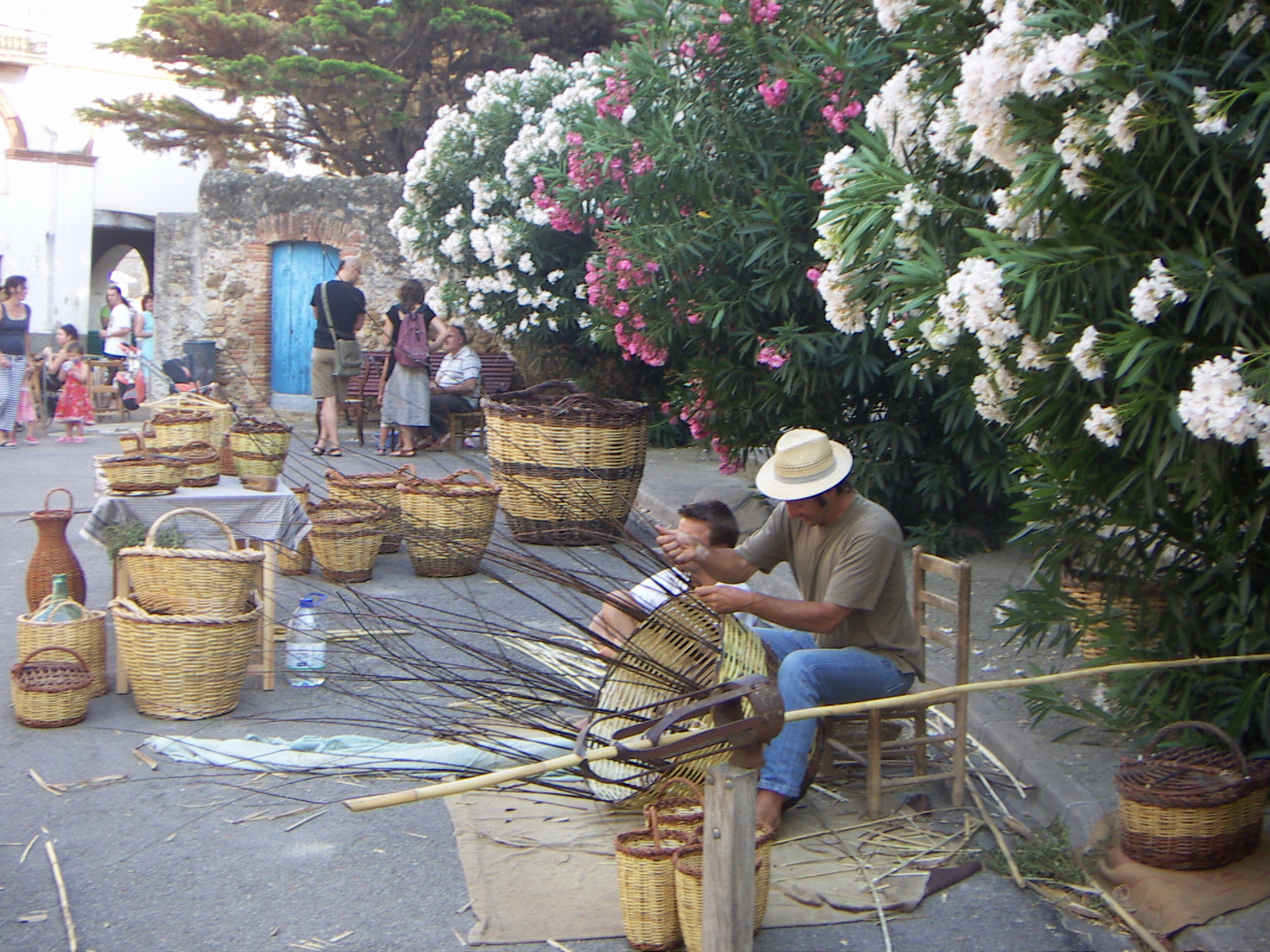
- Making wickerware in main square of Cabanes

- Coat of arms

- Location in Catalonia Cabanes (Spain)
- Coordinates: 42°18′40″N 2°58′37″E
- Country: Spain
- Community: Catalonia
- Province: Girona
- Comarca: Alt Empordà

Government
  - Mayor: Àlex Hernandez Gonzalez (2015)

Area
  - Total: 15.0 km^{2} (5.8 sq mi)

Population (2025-01-01)
  - Total: 995
  - Density: 66.3/km^{2} (172/sq mi)
- Website: www.cabanes.cat

Cabanes (Catalan pronunciation: [kəˈβanəs]) is a municipality in the comarca of Alt Empordà, Girona, Catalonia, Spain.
