= Sant Climent Sescebes =

- Municipality
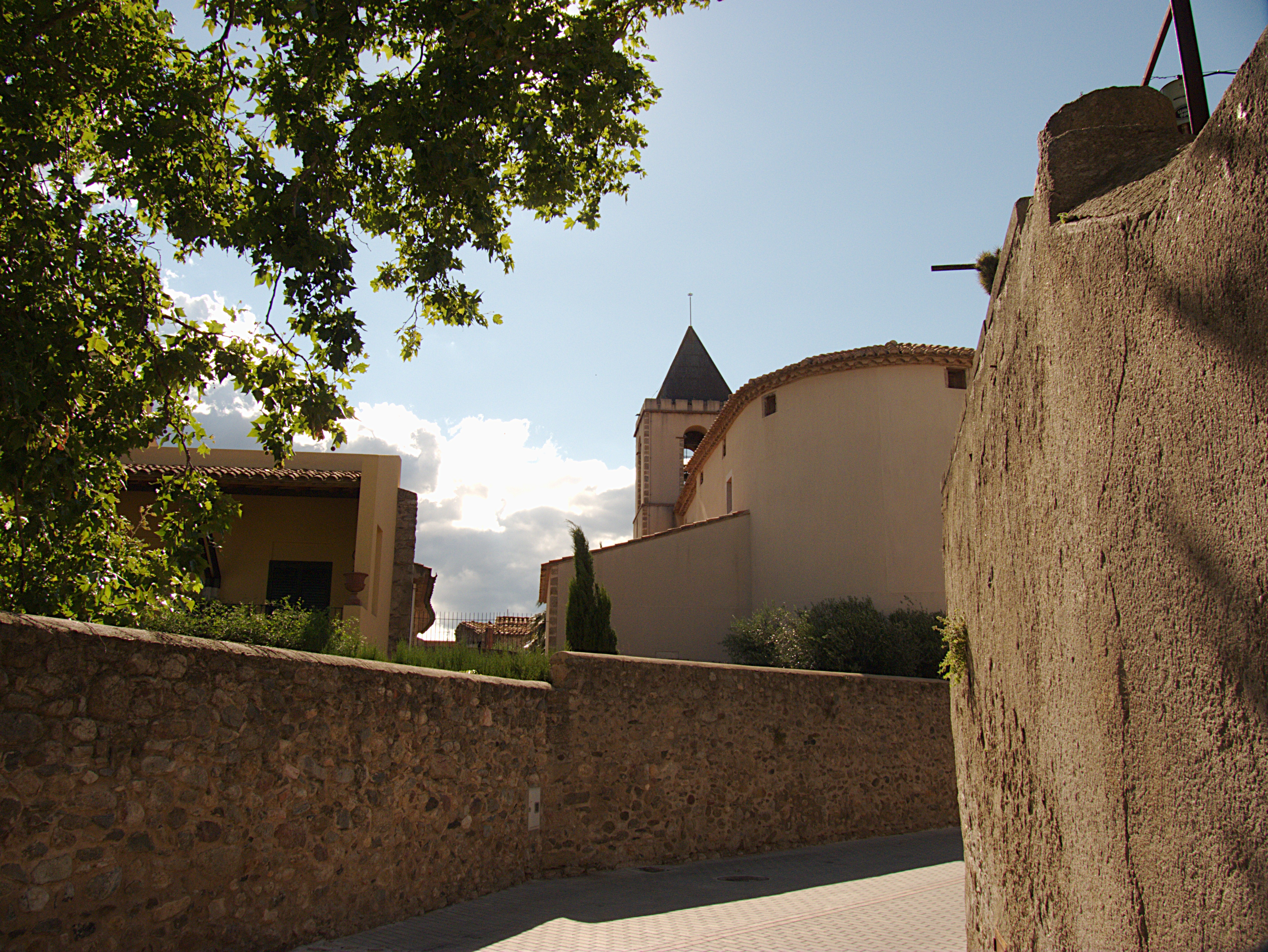
- Parish church

- Coat of arms

- Location in the Province of Girona Location in Catalonia Location in Spain
- Coordinates: 42.369°N 2.980°E
- Country: Spain
- Community: Catalonia
- Province: Girona
- Comarca: Alt Empordà

Government
  - Mayor: Olga Carbonell Sabartés (2015) (ERC)

Area
  - Total: 24.4 km^{2} (9.4 sq mi)

Population (2025-01-01)
  - Total: 690
  - Density: 28/km^{2} (73/sq mi)
- (INE)
- Demonym(s): Santclimetenc, Santclimetenca (in Catalan)
- Postal code: 17751
- Website: www.santcliment.cat

Sant Climent Sescebes (Old Catalan for 'Saint Clement [of]-the-Onions'; Catalan pronunciation: [ˈsaŋ kliˈmen səˈsɛβəs]) is a municipality in the comarca of Alt Empordà, Girona, Catalonia, Spain.
