= Vilamaniscle =

- Municipality
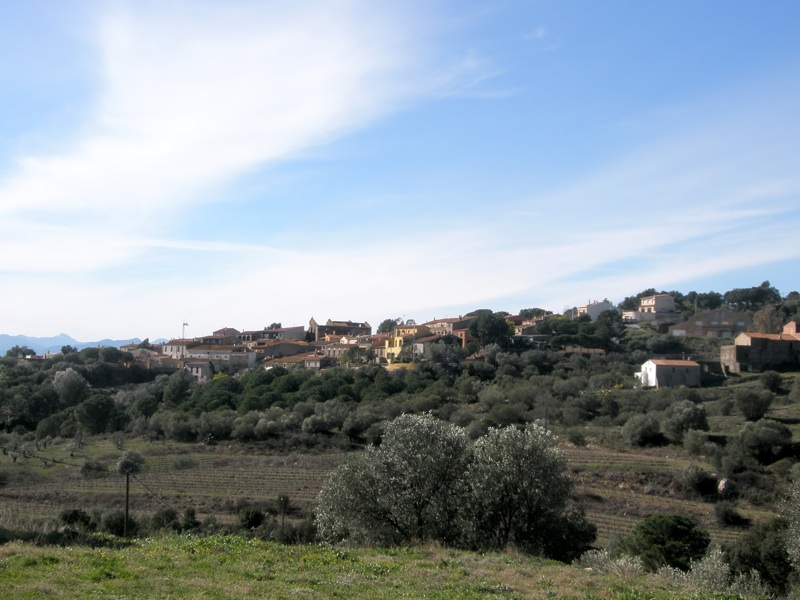
- Vilamaniscle

- Coat of arms

- Location in Catalonia Vilamaniscle (Spain)
- Coordinates: 42°22′N 3°4′E
- Country: Spain
- Community: Catalonia
- Province: Girona
- Comarca: Alt Empordà

Government
  - Mayor: Ramon Bonaterra Moltó (2015)

Area
  - Total: 5.5 km^{2} (2.1 sq mi)

Population (2025-01-01)
  - Total: 185
  - Density: 34/km^{2} (87/sq mi)
- Website: www.vilamaniscle.cat

Vilamaniscle (Catalan pronunciation: [ˌbiləməˈnisklə]) is a municipality in the comarca of Alt Empordà, Girona, Catalonia, Spain. It is located in the western part of the Serra de la Baga d'en Ferràn, a branch of the Albera Range. Much of its municipal term is covered with pine and cork oak trees. The main crops are olives and grapes. Local wine is appreciated all over the country. New hosting services are growing due to tourism.

Vilamaniscle is the home for around 120 inhabitants today. The village is a varied picture of some restored homes, others in the process of restoration and still others that wait for their renovation. The majority of the houses were built between the 17th and 19th centuries. Vilamaniscle is dominated by the "Castell", a three-level unrestored building whose origin is difficult to date. In the prehistoric time people probably lived here, the evidence being the three-meter-high menhir "Pedra Dreta" which is very close to Vilamaniscle.
