= La Vajol =

- Municipality
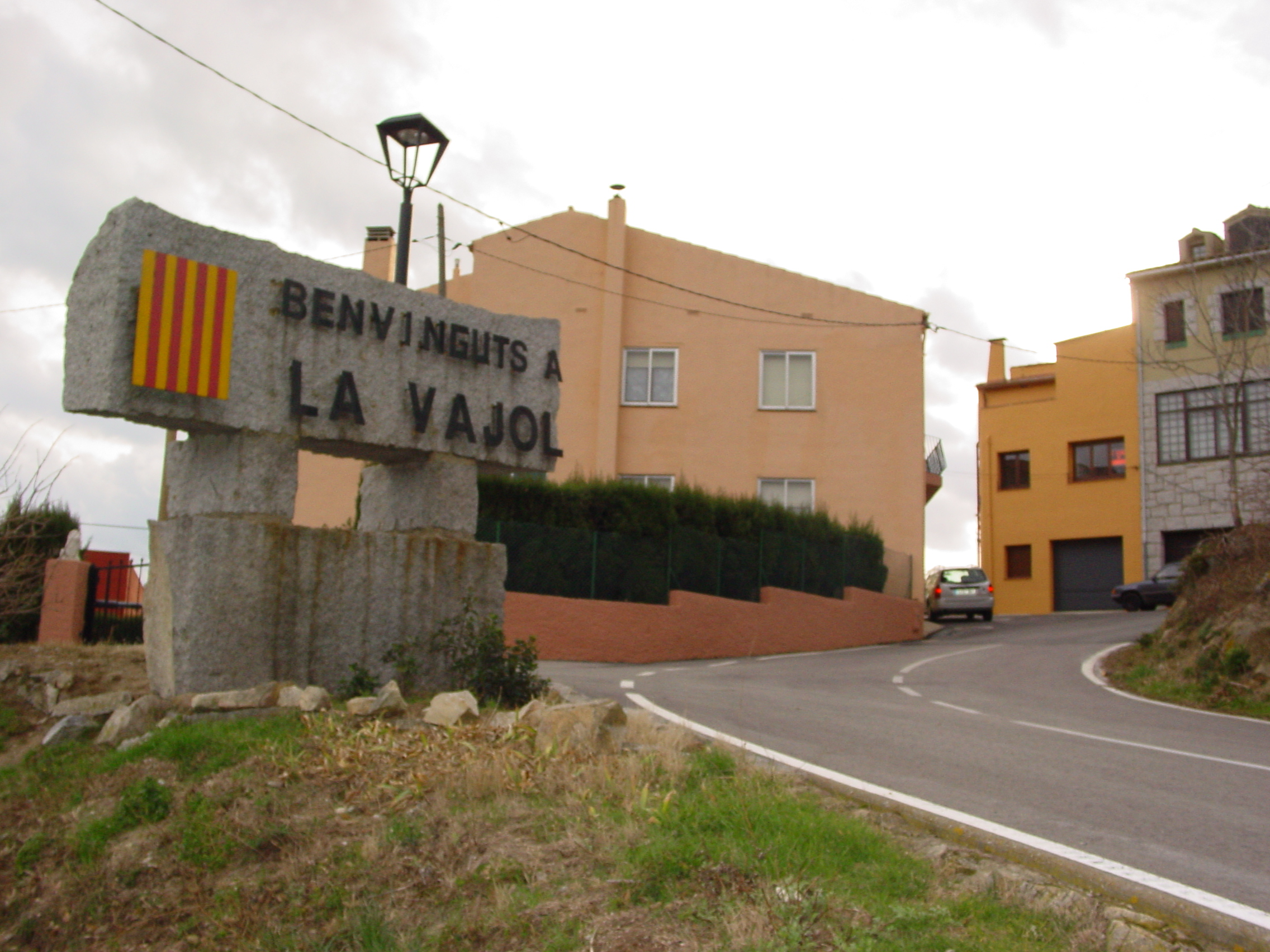
- Entry at the town

- Coat of arms

- Location in Catalonia La Vajol (Spain)
- Coordinates: 42.405°N 2.800°E
- Country: Spain
- Community: Catalonia
- Province: Girona
- Comarca: Alt Empordà

Government
  - Mayor: Joaquim Morillo Mañas (2015)

Area
  - Total: 4.7 km^{2} (1.8 sq mi)

Population (2025-01-01)
  - Total: 112
  - Density: 24/km^{2} (62/sq mi)
- Website: lavajol.cat

La Vajol (Catalan pronunciation: [lə βəˈʒɔl]) is a municipality in the comarca of Alt Empordà, Girona, Catalonia, Spain.
