= Pedret i Marzà =

- Municipality
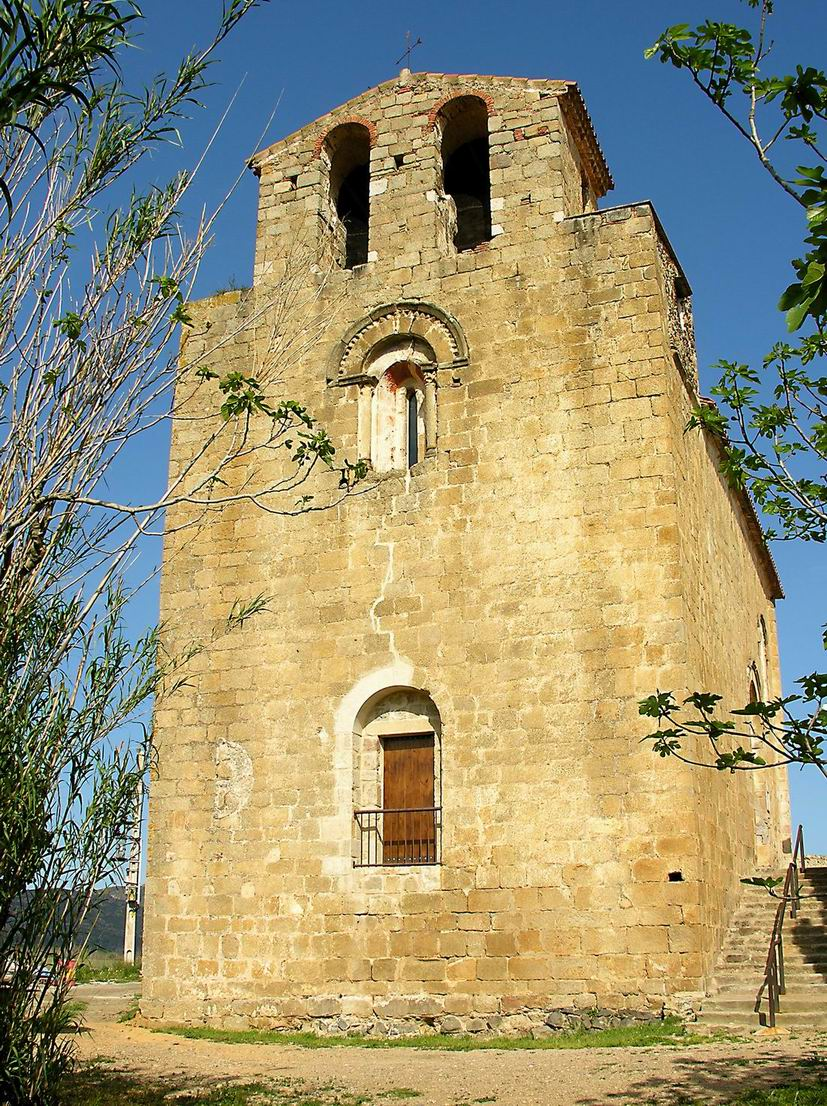

- Flag Coat of arms

- Location in Catalonia Pedret i Marzà (Spain)
- Coordinates: 42.311°N 3.067°E
- Country: Spain
- Community: Catalonia
- Province: Girona
- Comarca: Alt Empordà

Government
  - Mayor: Natalia Amiel Bruguera (2015)

Area
  - Total: 8.6 km^{2} (3.3 sq mi)

Population (2025-01-01)
  - Total: 208
  - Density: 24/km^{2} (63/sq mi)
- Website: www.pedret-marza.cat

Pedret i Marzà (Catalan pronunciation: [pəˈðɾɛt i məɾˈza]) is a municipality in the comarca of Alt Empordà, Girona, Catalonia, Spain.
