= Masarac =

- Municipality
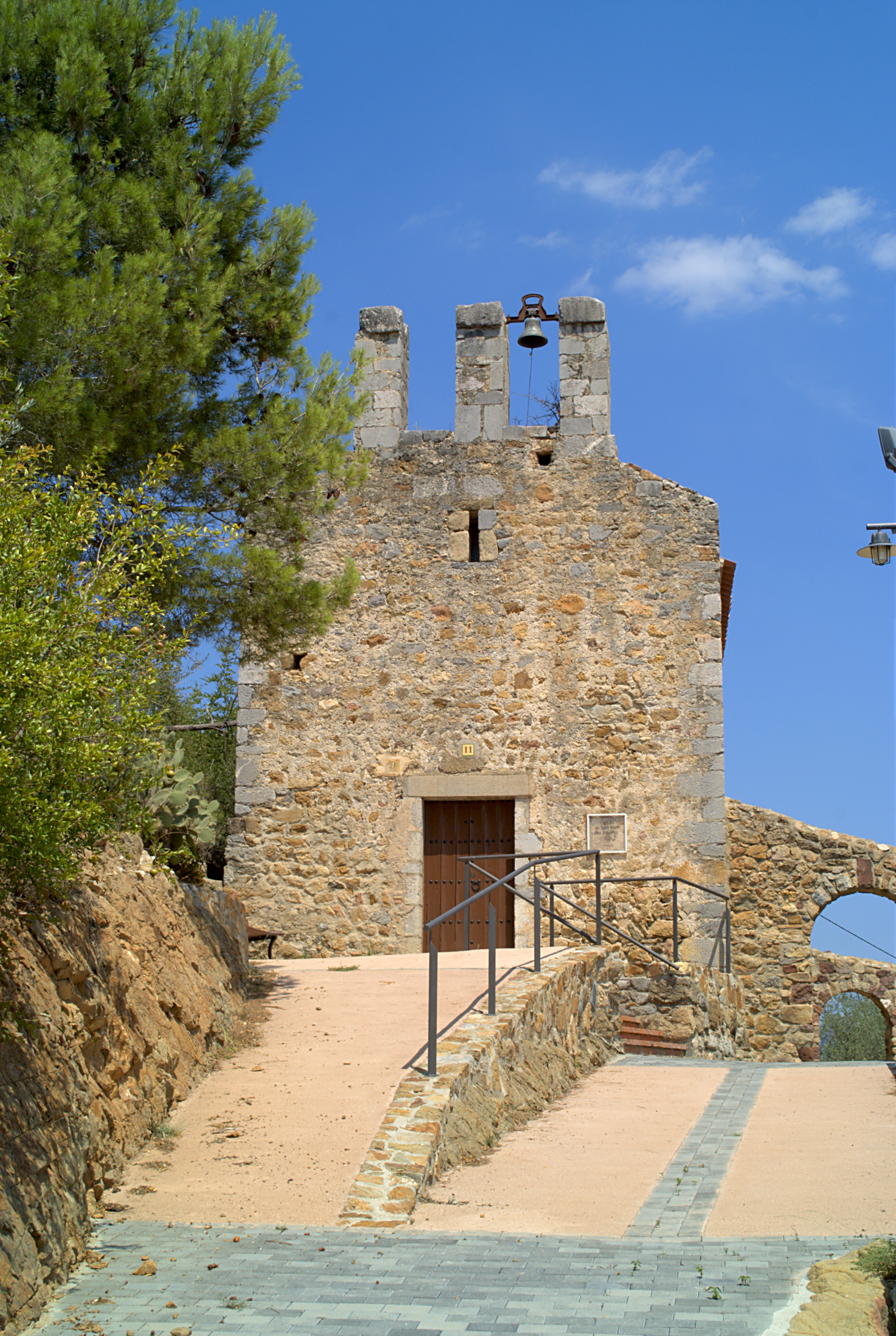
- St. Martin's church, Masarac

- Coat of arms

- Location in Catalonia Masarac (Spain)
- Coordinates: 42.353°N 2.974°E
- Country: Spain
- Community: Catalonia
- Province: Girona
- Comarca: Alt Empordà

Government
  - Mayor: Lluís Pujol Molas (2015)

Area
  - Total: 12.6 km^{2} (4.9 sq mi)

Population (2025-01-01)
  - Total: 287
  - Density: 22.8/km^{2} (59.0/sq mi)
- Website: www.masarac.cat

Masarac (Catalan pronunciation: [məzəˈɾak]) is a municipality in the comarca of Alt Empordà, Girona, Catalonia, Spain.
