= Santa Llogaia d'Àlguema =

- Municipality
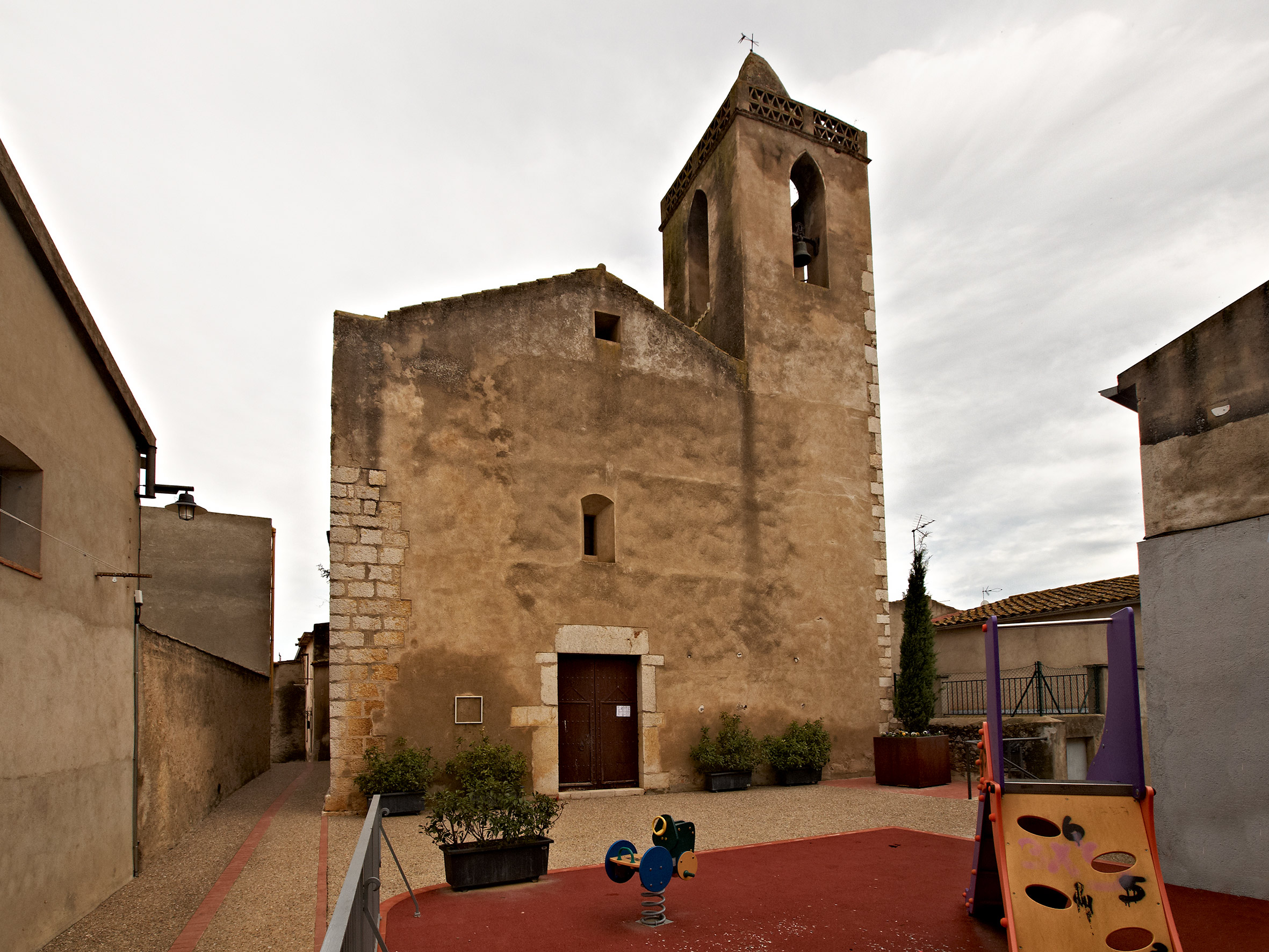
- Church of Santa Llogaia d'Àlguema

- Flag Coat of arms

- Location in Catalonia Santa Llogaia d'Àlguema (Spain)
- Coordinates: 42.233°N 2.950°E
- Country: Spain
- Community: Catalonia
- Province: Girona
- Comarca: Alt Empordà

Government
  - Mayor: David Bahí Serra (2015)

Area
  - Total: 1.9 km^{2} (0.73 sq mi)

Population (2025-01-01)
  - Total: 396
  - Density: 210/km^{2} (540/sq mi)
- Website: www.santallogaia.cat

Santa Llogaia d'Àlguema (Catalan pronunciation: [ˈsantə ʎuˈɣajə ˈðalɣəmə]) is a municipality in the comarca of Alt Empordà, Girona, Catalonia, Spain.
