= Garriguella =

- Municipality
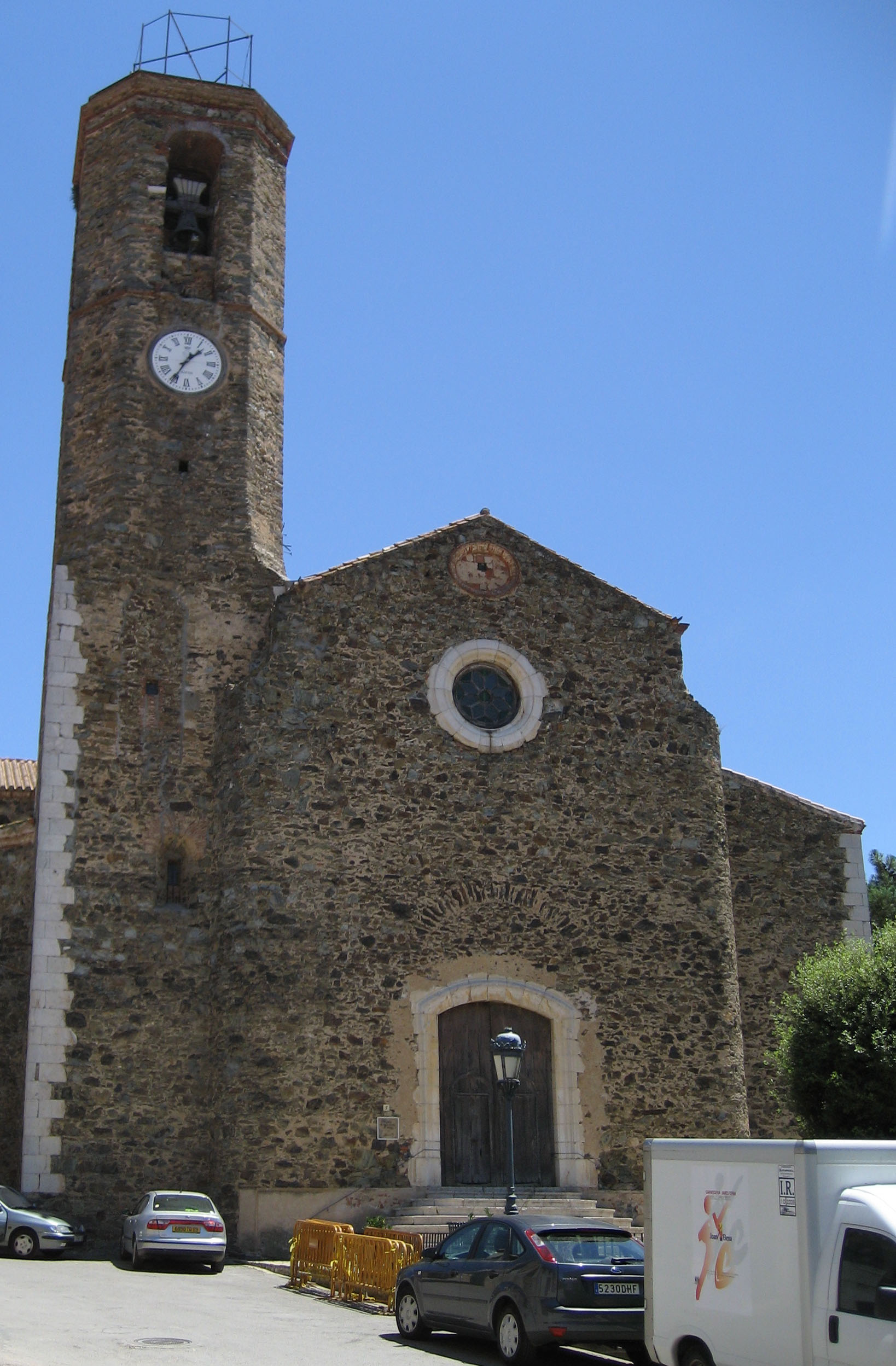
- St. Eulàlia de Noves church, Garriguella

- Flag Coat of arms

- Location in Catalonia Garriguella (Spain)
- Coordinates: 42.345°N 3.064°E
- Country: Spain
- Community: Catalonia
- Province: Girona
- Comarca: Alt Empordà

Government
  - Mayor: Isabel Teixidor Damm (2015)

Area
  - Total: 21.0 km^{2} (8.1 sq mi)

Population (2025-01-01)
  - Total: 989
  - Density: 47.1/km^{2} (122/sq mi)
- Website: www.garriguella.cat

Garriguella (Catalan pronunciation: [gəriˈɣeʎə]) is a municipality in the comarca of Alt Empordà, Girona, Catalonia, Spain.
