= Vilamacolum =

- Municipality
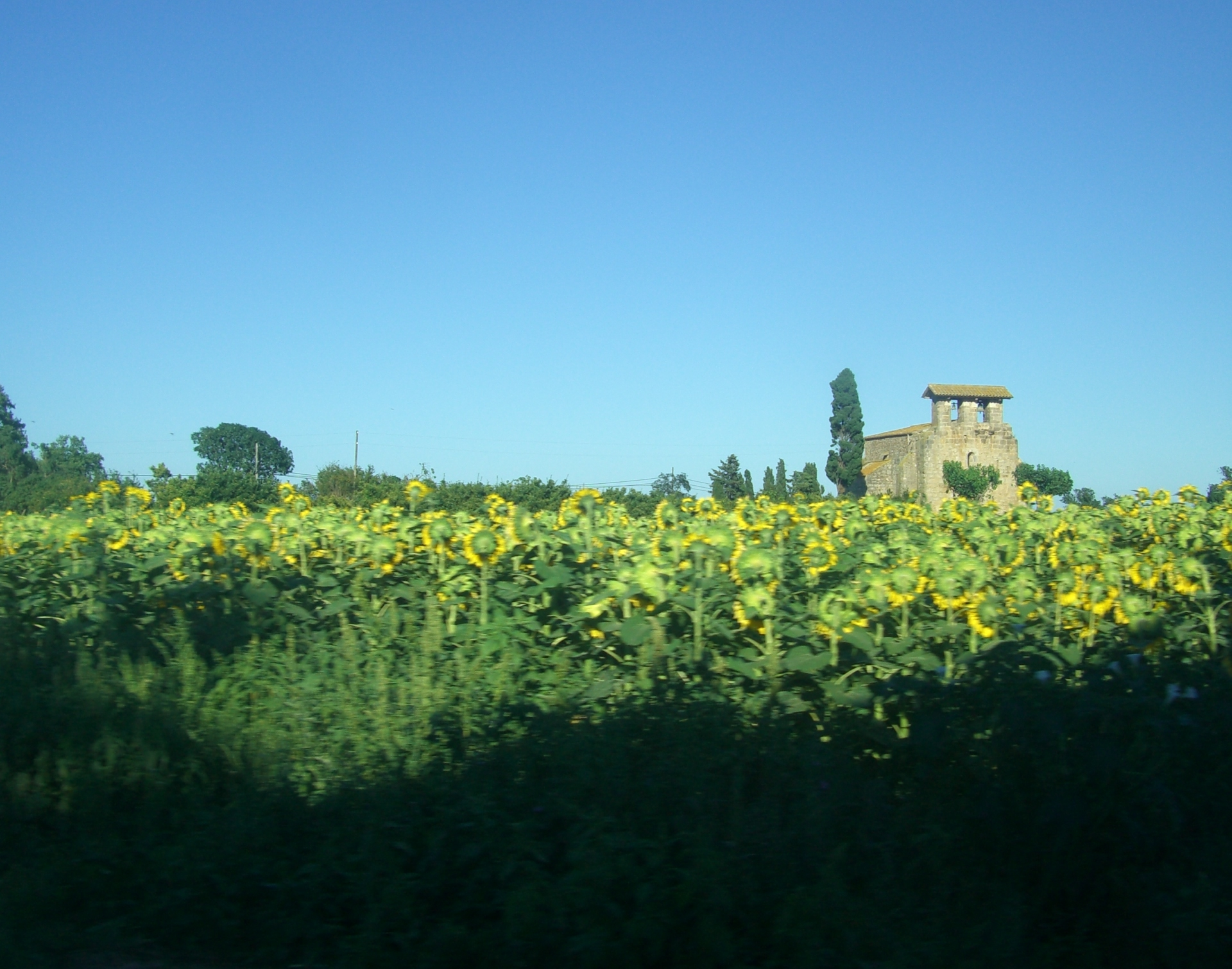
- Fortified church of Santa Maria de Vilamacolum

- Flag Coat of arms

- Location in Catalonia Vilamacolum (Spain)
- Coordinates: 42.197°N 3.057°E
- Country: Spain
- Community: Catalonia
- Province: Girona
- Comarca: Alt Empordà

Government
  - Mayor: Jaume Dalmau Juanola (2015)

Area
  - Total: 5.6 km^{2} (2.2 sq mi)

Population (2025-01-01)
  - Total: 406
  - Density: 73/km^{2} (190/sq mi)
- Website: www.vilamacolum.cat

Vilamacolum (Catalan pronunciation: [ˌbiləməkuˈlum]) is a municipality and village in the comarca of Alt Empordà, Girona, Catalonia. It is on the left side of the Fluvià river, in a flat land. The local economy is based on agriculture and tourism.

The Catalan writer Maria Àngels Anglada lived and died in Vilamacolum. That is why in her novels she describes the village and its surroundings, such as the Aiguamolls de l'Empordà.
