= Alt Empordà =

Coordinates: 42.2881°N 2.93306°E

- Comarca
- Flag Coat of arms

- Country: Spain
- Autonomous community: Catalonia
- Region: Comarques Gironines
- Province: Girona
- Capital: Figueres
- Municipalities: List: Agullana, Albanyà, L'Armentera, Avinyonet de Puigventós, Bàscara, Biure, Boadella d'Empordà, Borrassà, Cabanelles, Cabanes, Cadaqués, Cantallops, Capmany, Castelló d’Empúries, Cistella, Colera, Darnius, L'Escala, Espolla, El Far d'Empordà, Figueres, Fortià, Garriguella, Garrigàs, La Junquera, Lladó, Llançà, Llers, Masarac, Maçanet de Cabrenys, Mollet de Peralada, Navata, Ordis, Palau de Santa Eulàlia, Paláu-Sabardera, Pau, Pedret i Marzà, Peralada, Pont de Molins, Pontós, El Port de la Selva, Portbou, Rabós, Riumors, Roses, Sant Climent Sescebes, Sant Llorenç de la Muga, Sant Miquel de Fluvià, Sant Mori, Sant Pere Pescador, Santa Llogaia d'Àlguema, Saus, Camallera i Llampaies, La Selva de Mar, Siurana, Terrades, Torroella de Fluvià, La Vajol, Ventalló, Vila-sacra, Vilabertran, Viladamat, Vilafant, Vilajuïga, Vilamacolum, Vilamalla, Vilamaniscle, Vilanant, Vilaür

Government
  - Body: Alt Empordà Comarcal Council
  - President: Agustí Badosa (Junts)

Area
  - Total: 1,357.4 km^{2} (524.1 sq mi)

Population (2024)
  - Total: 146,766
  - Density: 108.12/km^{2} (280.04/sq mi)
- Demonym
- Time zone: UTC+1 (CET)
  - Summer (DST): UTC+2 (CEST)
- Largest municipality: Figueres

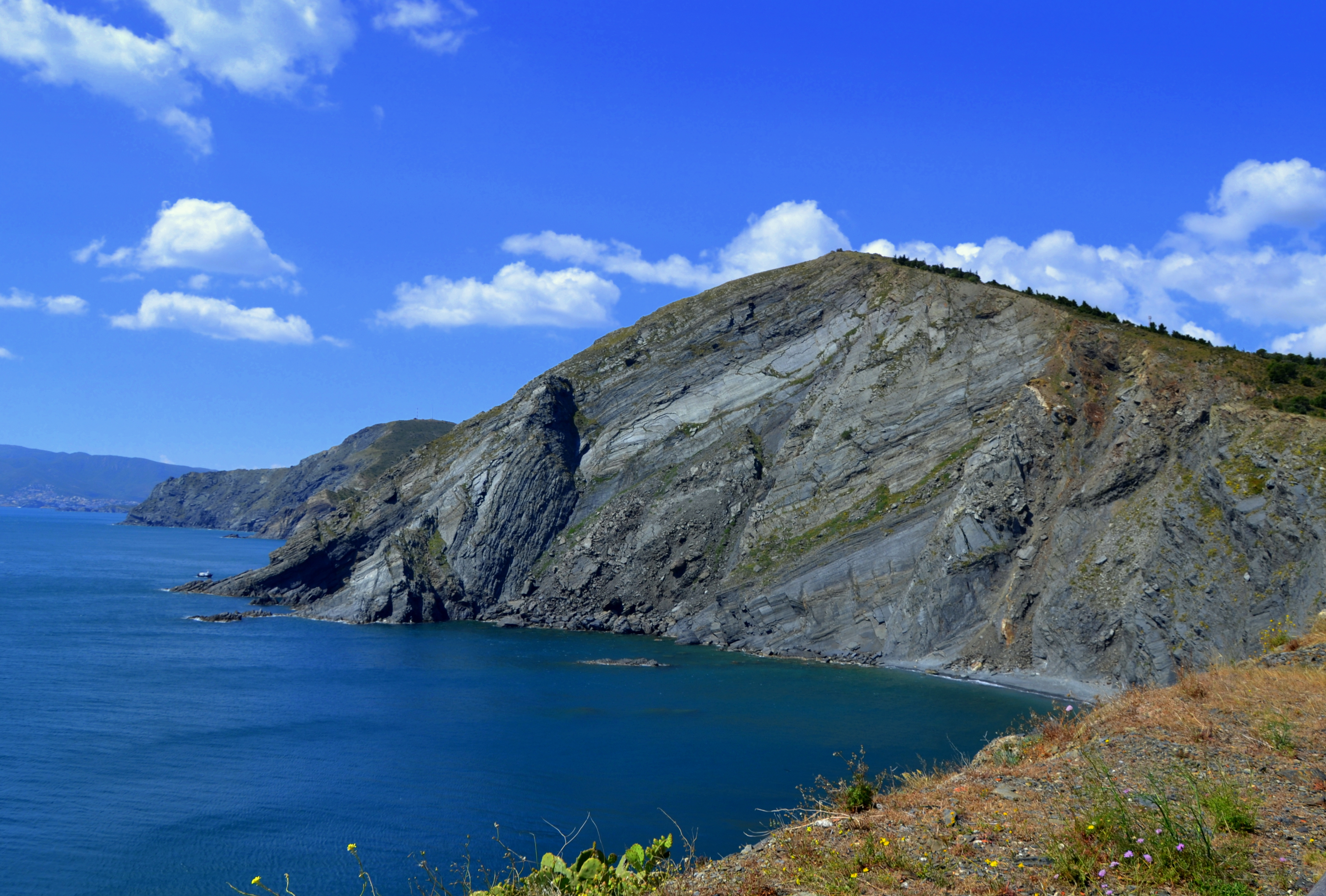
Coastal cliffs, Cervera de la Marenda, near the French border

Alt Empordà (Catalan: [ˈal əmpurˈda]; Spanish: Alto Ampurdán; "Upper Empordà") is a comarca (county) located in the Girona region, in Catalonia, Spain. It is one of two comarques into which Empordà was divided by the comarca division of Catalonia in 1936, the other one being Baix Empordà. The capital is the municipality of Figueres.

== Municipalities ==
| Municipality | Population (2014) | Area km^{2} |
|---|---|---|
| Agullana | 826 | 27.7 |
| Albanyà | 155 | 94.4 |
| L'Armentera | 901 | 5.6 |
| Avinyonet de Puigventós | 1,581 | 12.3 |
| Bàscara | 949 | 17.5 |
| Biure | 245 | 10.0 |
| Boadella i les Escaules | 248 | 10.8 |
| Borrassà | 728 | 9.4 |
| Cabanelles | 243 | 55.6 |
| Cabanes | 921 | 15.0 |
| Cadaqués | 2,820 | 26.4 |
| Cantallops | 324 | 19.6 |
| Capmany | 612 | 26.4 |
| Castelló d'Empúries | 11,473 | 42.3 |
| Cistella | 293 | 25.6 |
| Colera | 532 | 24.4 |
| Darnius | 534 | 34.9 |
| L'Escala | 10,143 | 16.3 |
| Espolla | 417 | 43.6 |
| El Far d'Empordà | 563 | 9.0 |
| Figueres | 45,444 | 19.3 |
| Fortià | 710 | 10.8 |
| Garrigàs | 398 | 19.9 |
| Garriguella | 857 | 21.0 |
| La Jonquera | 3,115 | 56.9 |
| Lladó | 767 | 13.5 |
| Llançà | 4,970 | 28.0 |
| Llers | 1,242 | 21.3 |
| Maçanet de Cabrenys | 781 | 67.9 |
| Masarac | 284 | 12.6 |
| Mollet de Peralada | 182 | 6.0 |
| Navata | 1,262 | 18.5 |
| Ordis | 380 | 8.6 |
| Palau de Santa Eulàlia | 98 | 8.4 |
| Palau-saverdera | 1,437 | 16.4 |
| Pau | 569 | 10.7 |
| Pedret i Marzà | 189 | 8.6 |
| Peralada | 1,859 | 43.6 |
| Pont de Molins | 529 | 8.7 |
| Pontós | 223 | 13.7 |
| El Port de la Selva | 980 | 41.6 |
| Portbou | 1,214 | 9.2 |
| Rabós | 182 | 45.1 |
| Riumors | 244 | 6.5 |
| Roses | 19,600 | 45.9 |
| Sant Climent Sescebes | 590 | 24.4 |
| Sant Llorenç de la Muga | 249 | 31.8 |
| Sant Miquel de Fluvià | 798 | 3.5 |
| Sant Mori | 177 | 7.5 |
| Sant Pere Pescador | 2,138 | 18.4 |
| Santa Llogaia d'Àlguema | 341 | 1.9 |
| Saus, Camallera i Llampaies | 815 | 11.4 |
| La Selva de Mar | 181 | 7.2 |
| Siurana | 150 | 10.5 |
| Terrades | 288 | 21.0 |
| Torroella de Fluvià | 704 | 16.8 |
| La Vajol | 86 | 4.7 |
| Ventalló | 836 | 25.0 |
| Vila-sacra | 681 | 6.0 |
| Vilabertran | 913 | 2.3 |
| Viladamat | 440 | 11.7 |
| Vilafant | 5,481 | 8.4 |
| Vilajuïga | 1,190 | 13.1 |
| Vilamacolum | 307 | 5.6 |
| Vilamalla | 1,103 | 8.8 |
| Vilamaniscle | 170 | 5.5 |
| Vilanant | 399 | 16.9 |
| Vilaür | 153 | 5.5 |
| • Total: 68 | 140,214 | 1,357.4 |

== County council ==
Councilors in the Comarcal Council of Alt Empordà since 1987
Key to parties CUP ICV–EUiA–EPM BComú–E (ENTESA) ERC TE PSC JxCat Junts CiU Cs PP Vox
| Election | Distribution | President |
| 1987 | 7 / 18 | Marià Lorca (CiU) |
| 1991 | 1 / 7 / 17 | Marià Lorca (CiU) |
| 1995 | 2 / 5 / 17 / 1 | Martí Palahí (CiU) |
| 1999 | 1 / 7 / 16 / 1 | Jordi Cabezas (CiU) |
| 2003 | 6 / 9 / 16 / 2 | Jordi Cabezas (CiU) |
| 2007 | 2 / 7 / 10 / 13 / 1 | Pere Vila (CiU) (2007-2009) |
| 2007 | 2 / 7 / 10 / 13 / 1 | Consol Cantenys (PSC) (2009-2011) |
| 2011 | 1 / 5 / 8 / 17 / 2 | Xavier Sanllehí (CiU) |
| 2015 | 1 / 1 / 9 / 5 / 15 / 1 / 1 | Ferran Roquer (PDeCAT) (2015-2018) |
| 2015 | 1 / 1 / 9 / 5 / 15 / 1 / 1 | Montserrat Mindan (PDeCAT) (2018-2019) |
| 2019 | 1 / 11 / 5 / 15 / 1 | Sònia Martínez (JxCat, Junts) |
| 2023 | 1 / 11 / 3 / 4 / 13 / 1 | Agustí Badosa (Junts) |
