= Cistella =

- Municipality
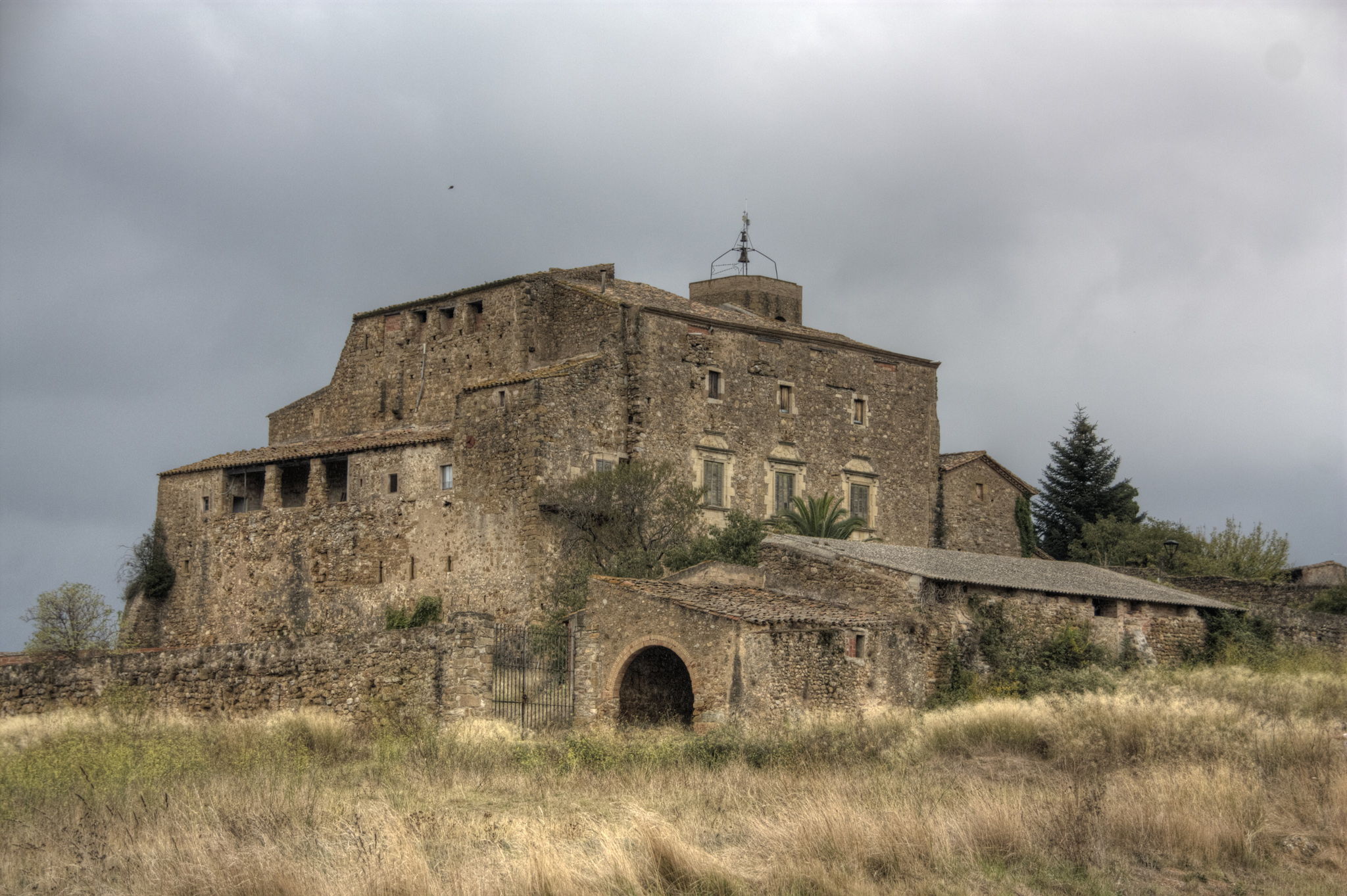
- Vilarig castle

- Flag Coat of arms

- Location in Catalonia Cistella (Spain)
- Coordinates: 42°16′N 2°51′E
- Country: Spain
- Community: Catalonia
- Province: Girona
- Comarca: Alt Empordà

Government
  - Mayor: Enrique Gironella Colomer (2015)

Area
  - Total: 25.6 km^{2} (9.9 sq mi)

Population (2025-01-01)
  - Total: 283
  - Density: 11.1/km^{2} (28.6/sq mi)
- Website: www.cistella.cat

Cistella (Catalan pronunciation: [sisˈteʎə]) is a municipality in the comarca of Alt Empordà, Girona, Catalonia, Spain.
