= Fortià =

- Municipality
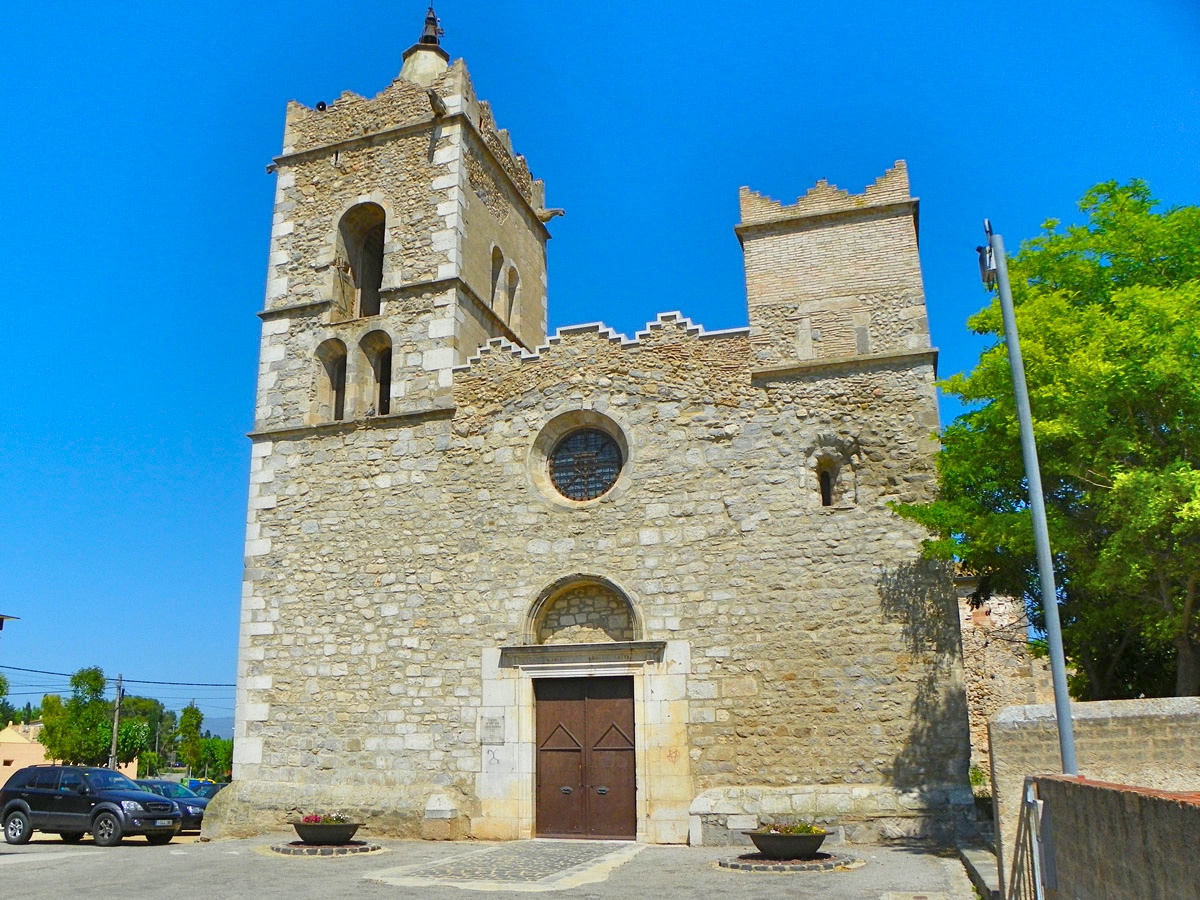
- Sant Julià and Santa Basilissa Church

- Coat of arms

- Location in Catalonia Fortià (Spain)
- Coordinates: 42.245°N 3.040°E
- Country: Spain
- Community: Catalonia
- Province: Girona
- Comarca: Alt Empordà

Government
  - Mayor: Francesc Brugués Massot (2015)

Area
  - Total: 10.8 km^{2} (4.2 sq mi)

Population (2025-01-01)
  - Total: 793
  - Density: 73.4/km^{2} (190/sq mi)
- Website: www.fortia.cat

Fortià (Catalan pronunciation: [fuɾtiˈa]) is a municipality in the comarca of Alt Empordà, Girona, Catalonia, Spain.
