= Borrassà =

- Municipality
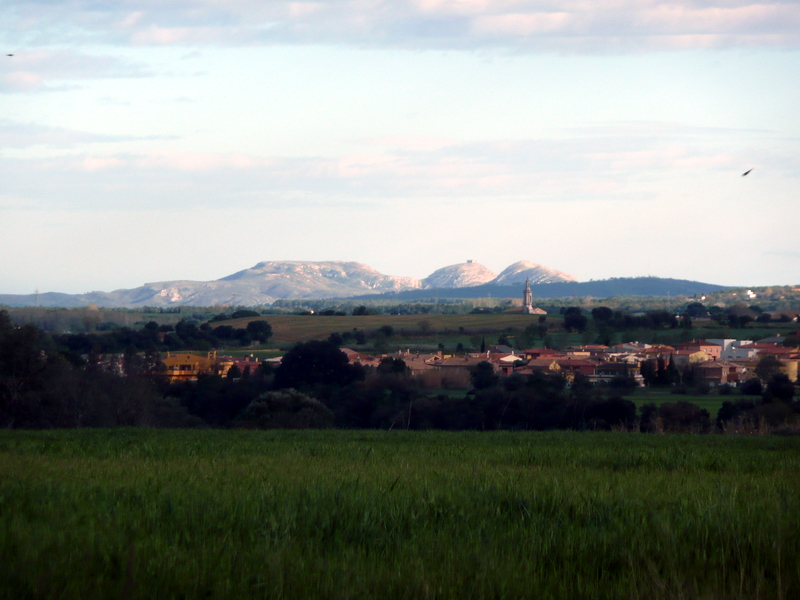
- Borrassà, with Montgrí in the background

- Coat of arms

- Location in Catalonia Borrassà (Spain)
- Coordinates: 42.225°N 2.927°E
- Country: Spain
- Community: Catalonia
- Province: Girona
- Comarca: Alt Empordà

Government
  - Mayor: Ferran Roquer Padrosa (2015)

Area
  - Total: 9.4 km^{2} (3.6 sq mi)

Population (2025-01-01)
  - Total: 804
  - Density: 86/km^{2} (220/sq mi)
- Website: www.borrassa.cat

Borrassà (Catalan pronunciation: [burəˈsa]) is a municipality in the comarca of Alt Empordà, Girona, Catalonia, Spain.
