= Siurana, Spain =

Siurana
- Municipality
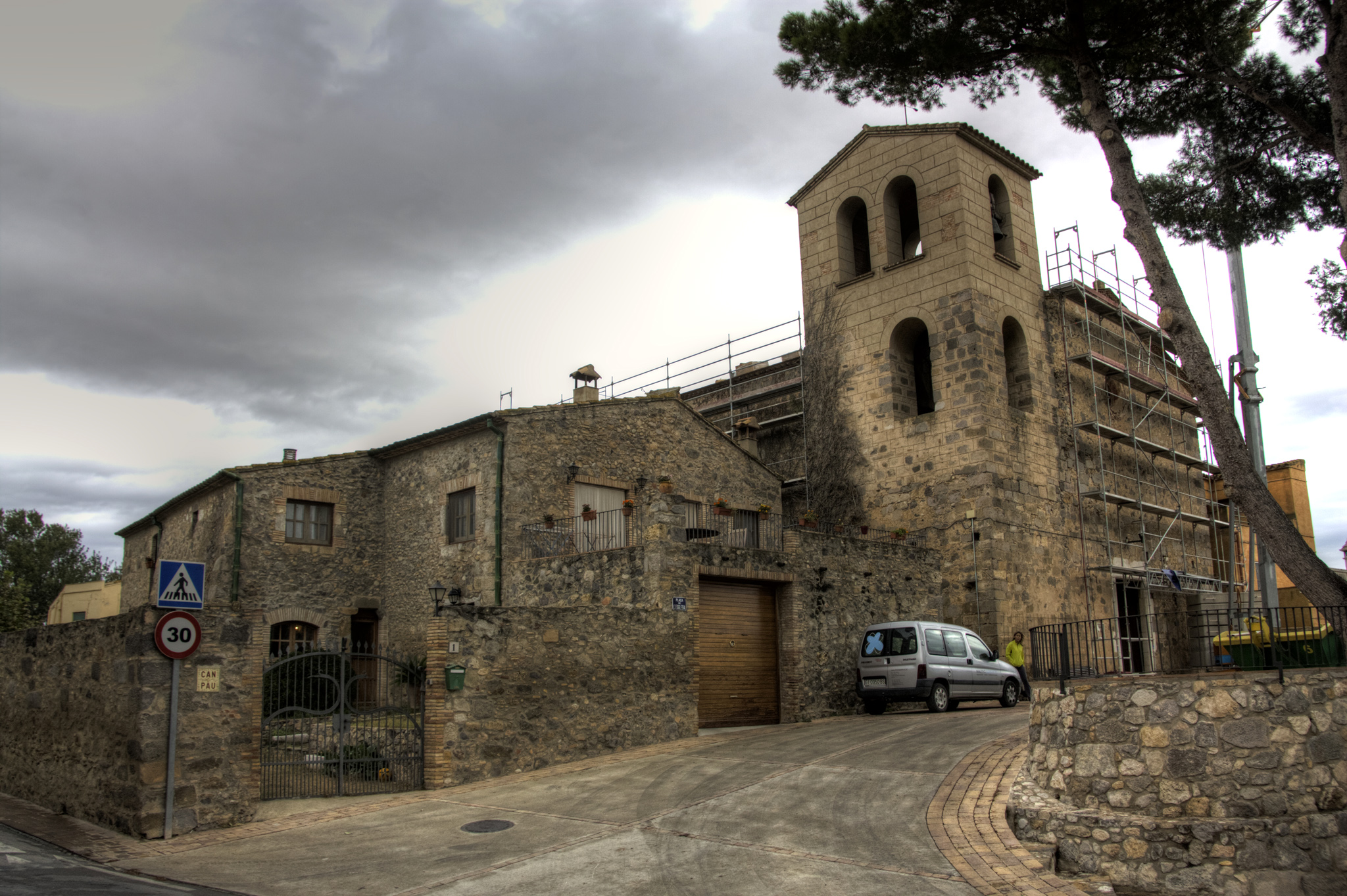
- Siurana castle

- Coat of arms

- Location in Catalonia Siurana (Spain)
- Coordinates: 42°12′30″N 2°59′30″E
- Country: Spain
- Community: Catalonia
- Province: Girona
- Comarca: Alt Empordà

Government
  - Mayor: Jordi Soto Herrera (2015)

Area
  - Total: 10.5 km^{2} (4.1 sq mi)

Population (2025-01-01)
  - Total: 188
  - Density: 17.9/km^{2} (46.4/sq mi)
- Website: webspobles2.ddgi.cat/siurana

Siurana (Catalan pronunciation: [siwˈɾanə]) is a municipality in the comarca of Alt Empordà, Girona, Catalonia, Spain located just south of Figueres.
