= Avinyonet de Puigventós =

- Municipality
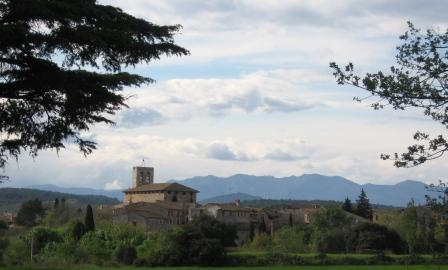

- Flag Coat of arms

- Location in Catalonia Avinyonet de Puigventós (Spain)
- Coordinates: 42.251°N 2.916°E
- Country: Spain
- Community: Catalonia
- Province: Girona
- Comarca: Alt Empordà

Government
  - Mayor: Josep Maria Bartolomé Foraster (2015)

Area
  - Total: 12.3 km^{2} (4.7 sq mi)

Population (2025-01-01)
  - Total: 1,671
  - Density: 136/km^{2} (352/sq mi)
- Website: www.avinyonetdepuigventos.cat

Avinyonet de Puigventós (Catalan pronunciation: [əβiɲuˈnɛd də ˌpudʒβənˈtos]) is a municipality in the comarca of Alt Empordà, Girona, Catalonia, Spain.
