= Riumors =

- Municipality
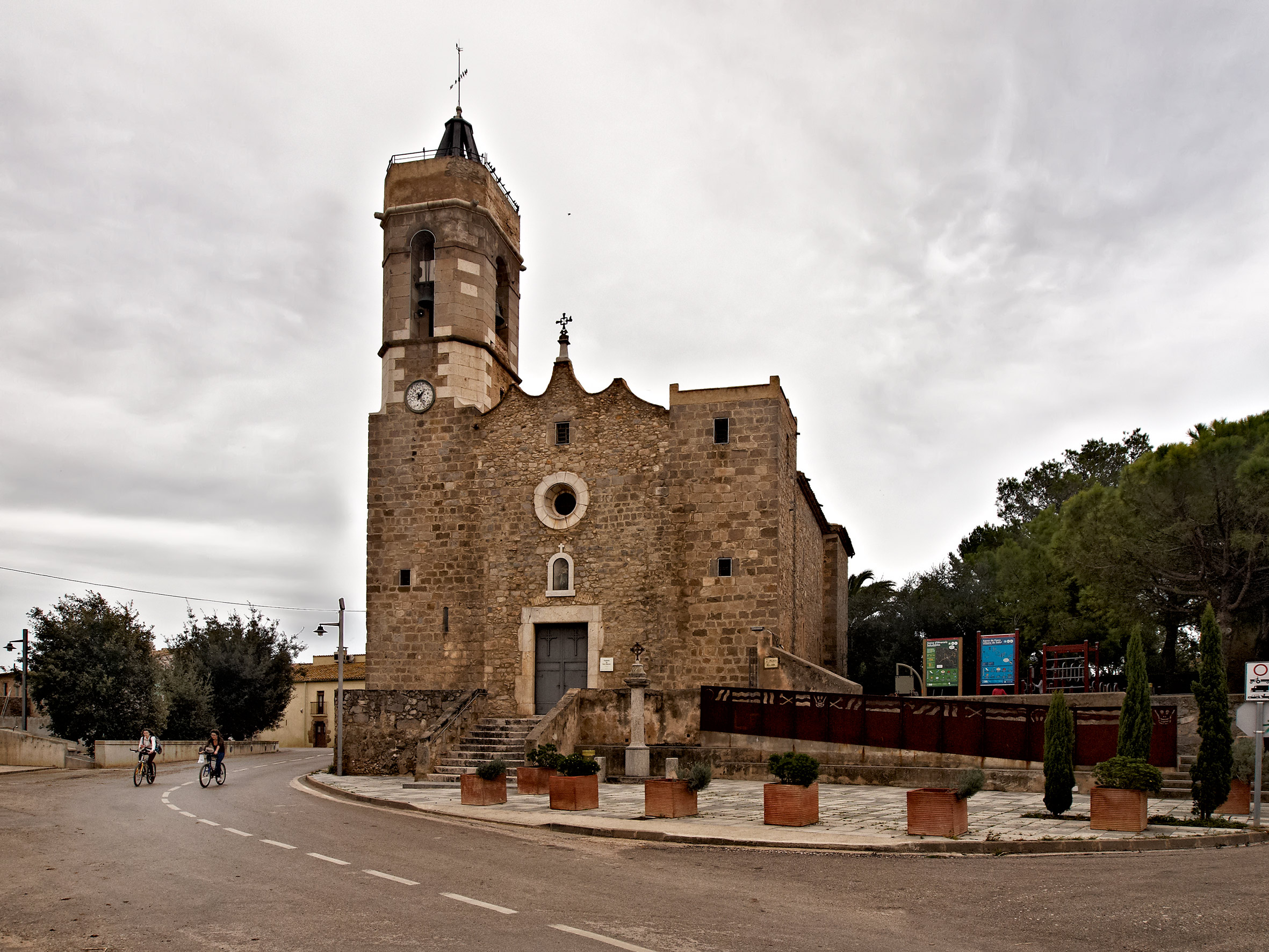
- St. Mamet church

- Coat of arms

- Location in Catalonia Riumors (Spain)
- Coordinates: 42.227°N 3.042°E
- Country: Spain
- Community: Catalonia
- Province: Girona
- Comarca: Alt Empordà

Government
  - Mayor: Josep Maria Padrosa Gorgot (2015)

Area
  - Total: 6.5 km^{2} (2.5 sq mi)

Population (2025-01-01)
  - Total: 253
  - Density: 39/km^{2} (100/sq mi)
- Website: webspobles2.ddgi.cat/riumors

Riumors (Catalan pronunciation: [riwˈmɔɾs]) is a municipality in the comarca of Alt Empordà, Girona, Catalonia, Spain.
