= Navata =

- Municipality
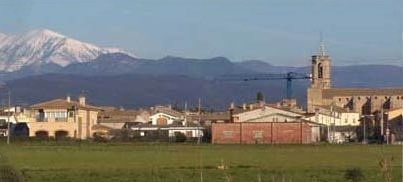

- Flag Coat of arms

- Location in Catalonia Navata (Spain)
- Coordinates: 42°13′31″N 2°51′43″E
- Country: Spain
- Community: Catalonia
- Province: Girona
- Comarca: Alt Empordà

Government
  - Mayor: Jaume Homs Campamar (2015)

Area
  - Total: 18.5 km^{2} (7.1 sq mi)
- Elevation: 145 m (476 ft)

Population (2025-01-01)
  - Total: 1,507
  - Density: 81.5/km^{2} (211/sq mi)
- Demonym: Navatenc
- Website: navata.cat

Navata (Catalan pronunciation: [nəˈβatə]) is a municipality in the comarca of Alt Empordà, province of Girona, Catalonia, Spain.
