= Montgrí, Medes Islands and Lower Ter Natural Park =

Protected area in Spain

- IUCN category V (protected landscape/seascape)
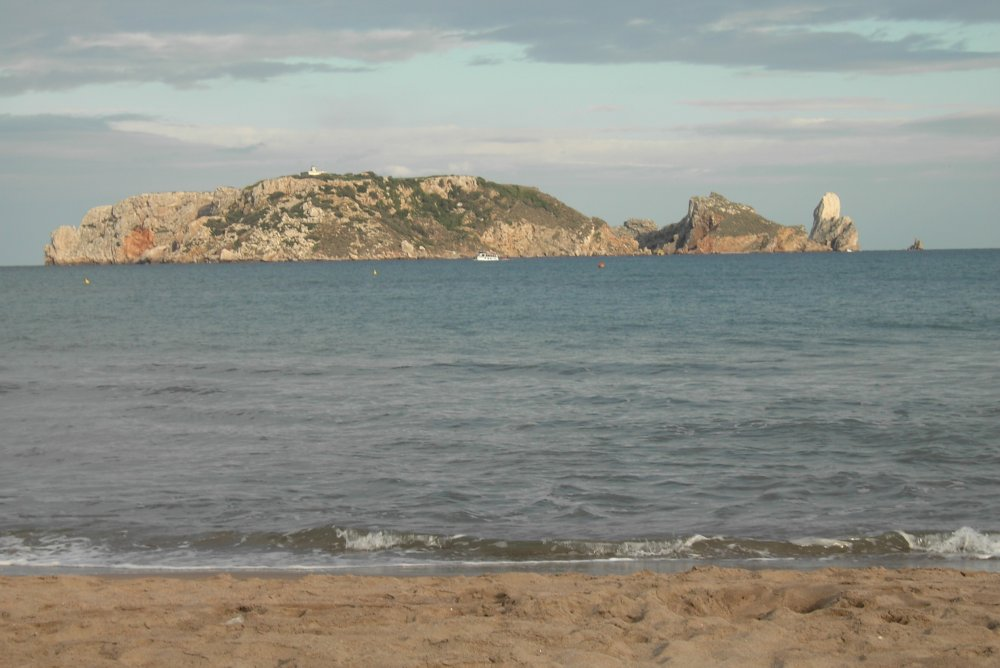
- The Medes Islands as seen from L'Estartit

- Location within Catalonia
- Location: Province of Girona, Catalonia, Spain
- Coordinates: 42°3′10″N 3°12′18″E
- Area: 8,192.19 hectares (20,243.3 acres)
- Established: 2010
- Governing body: Generalitat de Catalunya
- Website: www.gencat.cat/parcs/illes_medes

Montgrí, Medes Islands and Lower Ter Natural Park (Catalan: Parc Natural del Montgrí, les illes Medes i el Baix Ter) is a natural park located in the province of Girona, Catalonia, Spain. The park was established in 2010 and encompasses the Medes Islands, the Montgrí Massif and the mouth of the Ter river, covering a land area of 6,155.20 hectares (15,209.8 acres) and a marine protected area of 2,036.99 hectares (5,033.5 acres). It stretches over the municipalities of L'Escala, Torroella de Montgrí, Pals, Bellcaire d'Empordà, Palau-sator, Ullà, Fontanilles and Gualta.
