= Joan Planellas i Barnosell =

Spanish Catholic bishop (born 1955

His Grace, The Most Reverend, Monsignor Joan Planellas Barnosell
- Metropolitan Archbishop of Tarragona
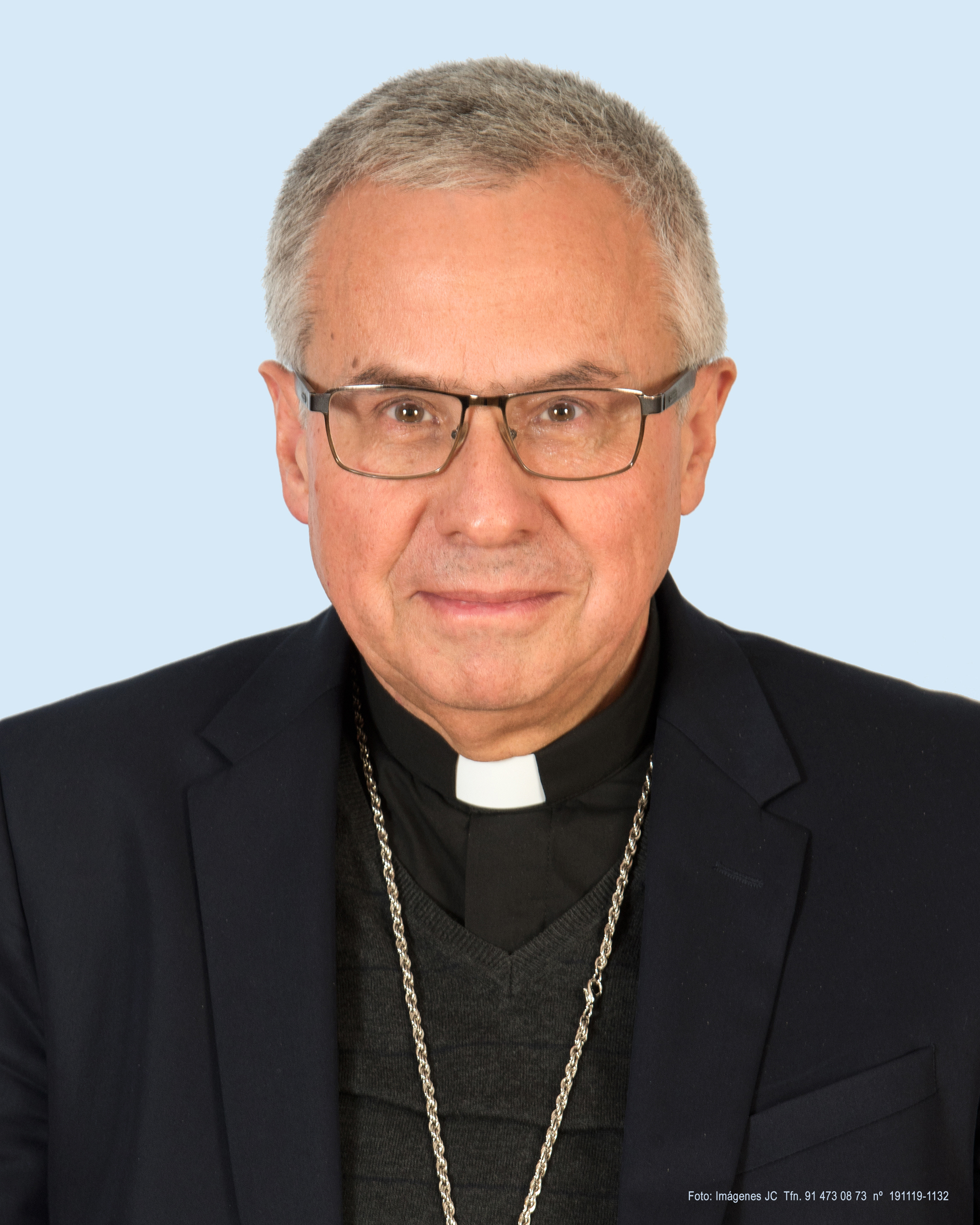
- Church: Roman Catholic Church
- Archdiocese: Tarragona
- Province: Tarragona
- Predecessor: Jaume Pujol Balcells

Orders
- Ordination: 28 March 1982
- Consecration: 4 May 2019

Personal details
- Born: Joan Planellas Barnosell; 7 November 1955 (age 70) Girona, Spain
- Denomination: Roman Catholicism
- Education: Pontifical Gregorian University
- Motto: Spiritus uivenem facit Eclesiampor
- Coat of arms

Joan Planellas i Barnosell (born 7 November 1955) is a Spanish prelate of the Catholic Church. He has been serving as the archbishop of Tarragona since his installation on 4 May 2019. He previously served as a canon on the Girona Cathedral. He was also given the Missionary of Mercy title, that is a group of priests that were designated by the Pope to forgive serious sins normally only reserved to the Holy See. Barnosell became a priest on 28 March 1982.

== Biography ==
Planellas was born in Girona on 7 November 1955. He grew up in Colomers. He studied at the Diocesan Seminary of Girona from 1968 to 1979 and was ordained a priest on 28 March 1982. He studied at the Pontifical Gregorian University from 1979 to 1981 and in 2003–2004, earning a doctorate in dogmatic theology.

He was professor of theology at the Seminary of Girona, director of the Higher Institute of Religious Sciences (1988–1998), rector of the Seminary of Girona (1996–2002), director of the Revista Catalana de Teologia (Catalan Journal of Theology), vice dean of the Faculty of Theology of Catalonia (2010–2015) and its Dean from 2015 to 2019. He also served as parish priest and administrator of various parishes from 1990 to 2019, when he was rector of Jafre, Garrigoles, Colomers, Foixà, and Rupià, and parochial administrator of the Tallada d'Empordà. In 2008, he was appointed Canon of the Cathedral Chapter in Girona and since 2013 has been a member of its Presbyterian Council.

On 4 May 2019, Pope Francis appointed him Archbishop of Tarragona. His episcopal consecration and installation are scheduled for 8 June. His appointment was unusual in that a priest is rarely made archbishop without having been a bishop, though Francis has made a similar appointment for Lima, Peru, in January 2019.

=== Catalan ===
Proponents of Catalan culture and independence welcomed the appointment because a non-Catalan had been rumored a likely appointment and half the bishops in Catalonia are not native to the region. One columnist saw the appointment as a shift from a "stigmatized" conservative view of the Girona clergy as political and separatist and credited Archbishop Juan José Omella of Barcelona with this “brave commitment to the Catalan church".

Planellas' parish church in Jafre flew the banner of Catalan independence from its tower in 2012 to mark the National Day of Catalonia, the Feast of San Martí, to whom the church is dedicated. (Note: The festivities last for a week and conclude on the feast day. The banner flew from the tower throughout the week.) A local resident, Dolors Caminal, (Note: Caminal is an artist and wife of the dramatist Albert Boadella who has a long and complicated history of involvement in Catalan politics.) objected that this "promotes a lack of solidarity and hatred toward the rest of our Spanish brothers". She rejected the local bishop's offer to discuss the matter privately. Planellas told a journalist that "the people asked for it" and it had become an annual tradition. He said "Jafre is a town that lives in peace. They complain because they like controversy.... I repeat that the flag is set by the people, not by the parish. It is a thing of the people." As for those who are unhappy: "Let them put the Spanish flag on their house, if they want." This dispute served as the basis for some 2019 headlines that called Panellas a "radical separatist" (separatista radical). Church sources described Planellas as "firmly Catalan but not radical".

== Writings ==
Selected major works:

- L’Església dels pobres» en el Concili Vaticà II (Col·lectània Sant Pacià 105), Barcelona: FTC 2013, 237 pp.; edició castellana, La Iglesia de los pobres en el Concilio Vaticano II, Barcelona: Herder 2014, 299 pp.; edició italiana, La Chiesa dei poveri. La sfida sempre attuale del Concilio Vaticano II, Prefazione di Armand Puig i Tàrrech (I libri di Sant’Egidio), Milano: Mondadori 2015; 279 pp.
- Bisbes, preveres i diaques. Els ministeris ordenats, Litúrgia Bàsica nº 26, Barcelona, Centre de Pastoral Litúrgica 2005, 24 pp.; traducció castellana, Obispos, presbíteros y diáconos. Los ministerios ordenados, Barcelona, Centre de Pastoral Litúrgica 2005, 24 pp.
- La recepción del Vaticano II en los manuales de eclesiología españoles, Ed. Pontificia Università Gregoriana, Serie Teologia nº 111, Roma 2004, 598 pp. (tesi doctoral).
- El Santuari de la Font Santa de Jafre, Col·lecció «Sant Feliu», nº 24, Girona: Gràfiques Cantalozella 2002, 63 pp.
- La maternitat de l’Església. Algunes reflexions per a la recuperació d’aquest concepte a l’Església d’avui, Quaderns de l’Institut Superior de Ciències Religioses de Girona, nº 7, Girona: ISCRG 2000, 51 pp.
