= Maria Pilar Bruguera Sábat =

Sister Maria Pilar Bruguera Sábat M.D.
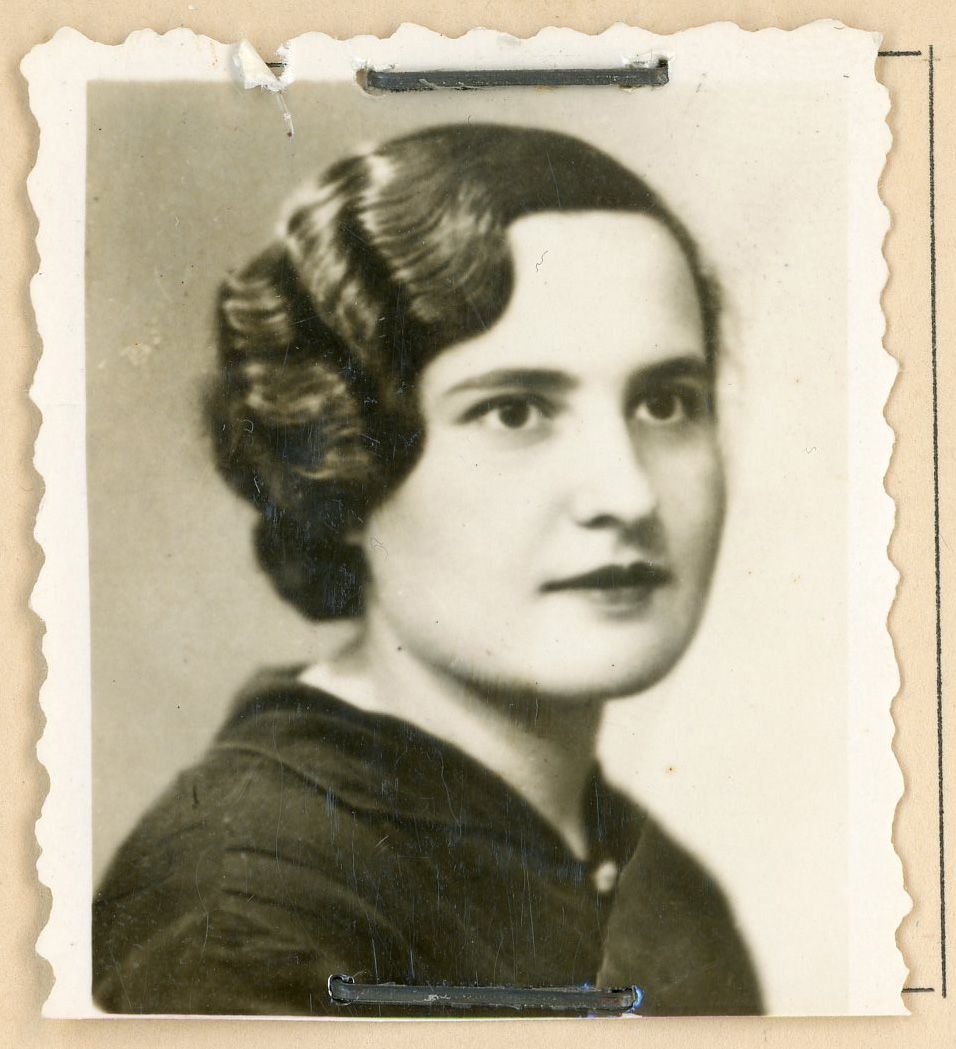
- Col·legi Oficial de Metges de Barcelona, 1939

Personal life
- Born: 1906 Girona, Spain
- Died: 1994 (aged 87–88) Vic, Spain
- Education: University of Barcelona

Religious life
- Religion: Roman Catholic
- Order: Carmelites
- Profession: nun; physician

Sister Maria Pilar Bruguera Sábat (Girona, 1906 – Vic, 1994) was a Spanish Catalan Roman Catholic nun and physician. Even after she graduated from the faculty of medicine of the University of Barcelona in 1934, she continued her religious career as a Sister of the Carmelite Charity. She exercised her profession mainly in the convent, Monestir de Carmelites Descalces de Terrassa. Pilar was the youngest of six siblings, all girls, among whom there were two doctors (the other being Carme Bruguera Sala) and three teachers.

== Biography ==
Pilar was the sixth daughter of attorney Martí Bruguera Sastre, originally from Regencós and Teobalda Sàbat, born in Torrent, Baix Empordà. The family lived on the second floor of Carrer Progrés, number 21, in Girona. The marriage had six daughters: Joaquima, M. Assumption, Teresa, Maria del Carme, Mercè, and Pilar. Assumption, Pilar, and Carme studied Teaching. Established in 1914, Escola Normal de Mestres de Girona was the higher education most accessible to girls in Girona.

Pilar did further studies at the Missioneres de l'Immaculat Cor de Maria in Girona, and later completed her Baccalaureate at the institute, located at the top of Calle de la Força in Girona, where she enrolled in 1926. She then enrolled at the faculty of medicine at the University of Barcelona, where she finished her degree in 1934. On January 12, 1935, she received her medical degree, although she did not join the Col·legi Oficial de Metges de Barcelona (College of Doctors of Barcelona) until 1947. In the membership card kept at the College of Doctors of Barcelona, she was listed as unmarried with an address at Carrer Vall, number 1 in Terrassa, which is the address of the Carmelite convent in the city. Her entry into the convent meant that she completed her training with teaching studies. She also earned her master's degree in 1952.

Pilar maintained her association with the College of Doctors of Barcelona all her life but it is not recorded that she practiced the profession. It is possible that she did it as a doctor in the convent. In 1961, she was registered as a member and religious, and in 1979, when she was already 70 years old, she was honored with the title of honorary member of the College of Doctors of Barcelona. In 1980, she retired from practicing the profession, although she maintained her association until hher death.

Sister Pilar Bruguera i Sábat died in Vic in 1994, when she was 85 years old.
