= Sant Pau, Fontclara =

Church building in Palau-sator, Spain

Coordinates: 41.99385°N 3.12275°E

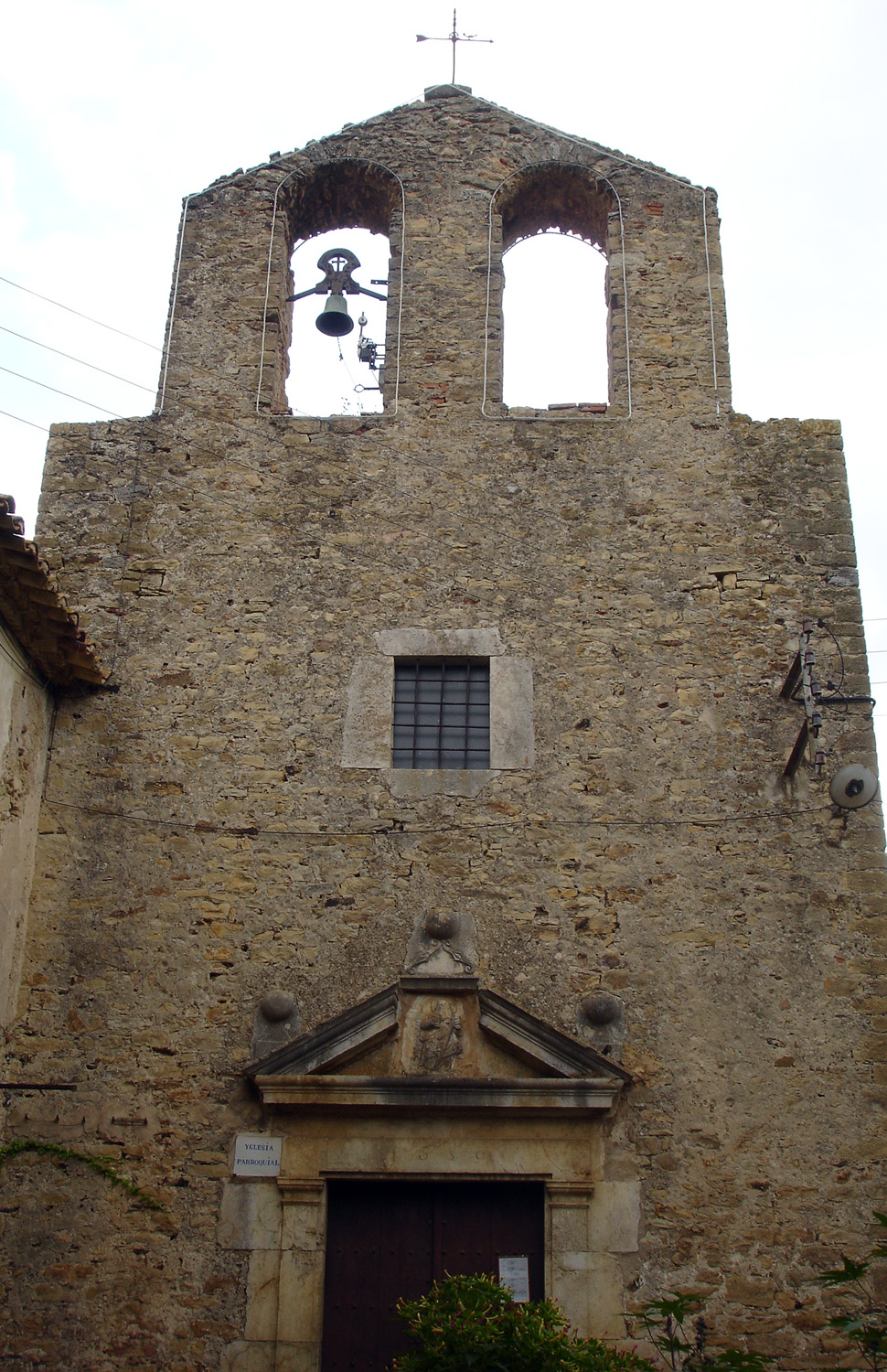
Sant Pau de Fontclara

Sant Pau de Fontclara is a parish church and former Benedictine monastery in the village of Fontclara, Palau-sator, Girona Province, Catalonia, Spain. It was formerly dependent on Lagrasse Abbey.

== Architecture and fittings ==
Of Romanesque design, further construction occurred to the building in the 16th and 17th centuries. Side chapels were added. It has a single nave with pointed vault and semicircular apse. The date of 1639 is recorded on the building. On the front facade, there is a bell gable with two recesses. Preserved in situ are some murals located on the arch and apse. There is a pediment with a bas relief depicting St. Paul and other paintings depicting the life of St. Paul.

== Bibliography ==
- Pladevall, Antoni (2000). Guies Catalunya Romànica, El Baix Empordà. Barcelona Pòrtic. ISBN 84-7306-637-5 (in Catalán).
