= Ultramort =

- Municipality
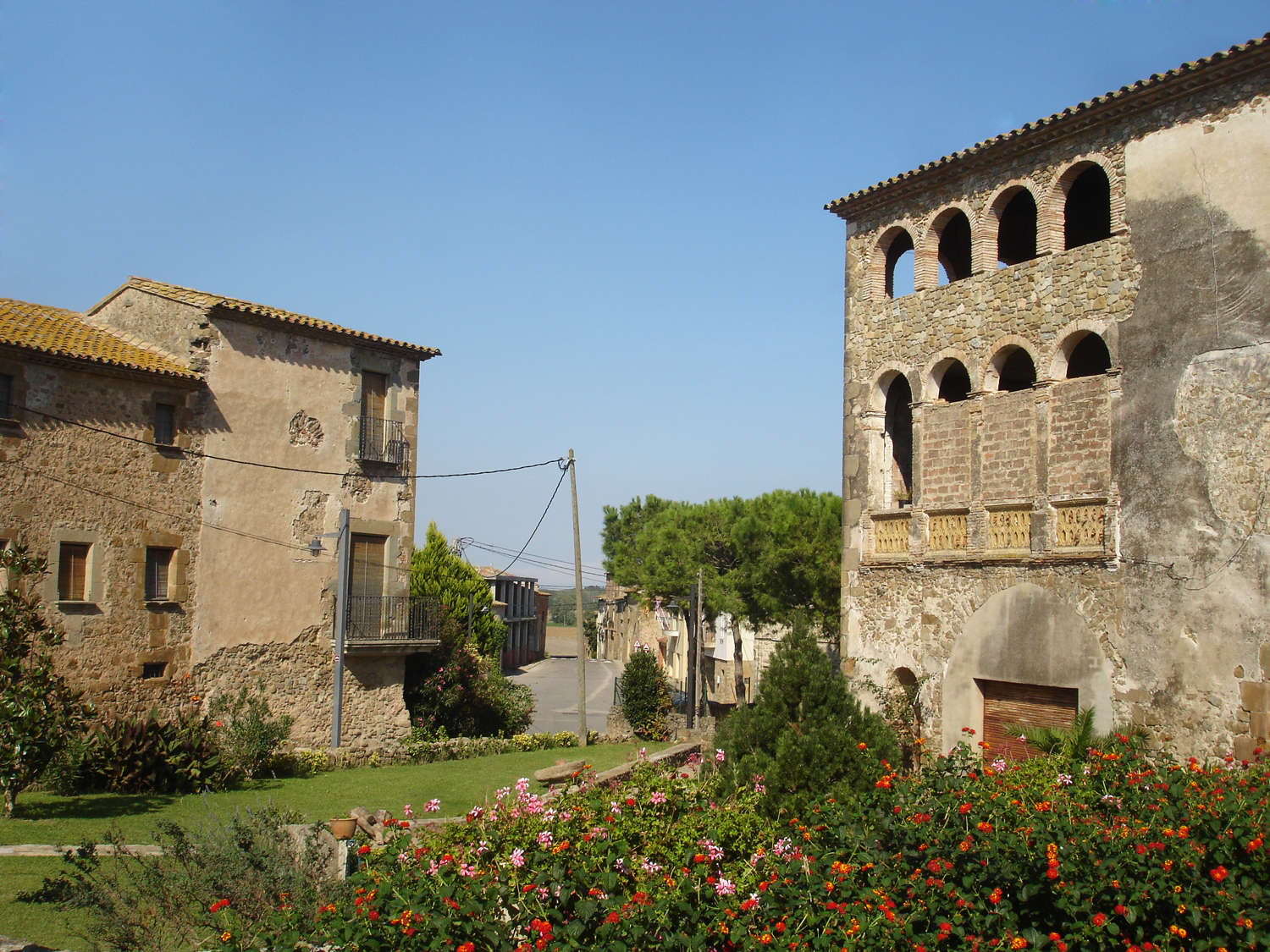
- Ultramort

- Flag Coat of arms

- Location in Catalonia Ultramort (Spain)
- Coordinates: 42°2′N 3°2′E
- Country: Spain
- Community: Catalonia
- Province: Girona
- Comarca: Baix Empordà

Government
  - Mayor: Maria Gràcia Serrats Paretas (2015)

Area
  - Total: 4.4 km^{2} (1.7 sq mi)

Population (2025-01-01)
  - Total: 218
  - Density: 50/km^{2} (130/sq mi)
- Website: www.ultramort.cat

Ultramort (Catalan pronunciation: [ultɾəˈmɔɾt]) is a village in the province of Girona and autonomous community of Catalonia, Spain.

Ultramort was first documented in 1046 with the name Ultramorte. From then on, mentions of the place become more frequent. The name Ultramort is made up of the Latin preposition ULTRA (meaning beyond) and the pre-Roman place name MURTA/MURTRA (meaning still water, well, pit, puddle). It was probably given the name from the perspective of one of the three villages on which it apparently depended until 1316 (Rúpia, Paralvá, Foixá). Ultramort would originally have been a small village depending on one of these three larger villages which were "on the other side of the pond", in other words ULTRA-MURTA.
