= Peratallada =

Town in Catalonia, Spain

Coordinates: 41°58′44.09″N 3°5′26.00″E

Peratallada, Spain

Street in Peratallada

Peratallada (Old Catalan for 'carved stone'; Catalan pronunciation: [ˌpeɾətəˈʎaðə]) is a town in the municipality of Forallac, in the county of Baix Empordà, in Catalonia, Spain. It is located 22 km east of Girona.

Declared a historic-artistic monument, most of the buildings are built from stone carved from the fosse or moat which still encircles parts of this small fortified medieval town. The privately owned Castle of Peratallada is the dominant structure in the center of the town, with a 13th-century Romanesque church dedicated to Sant Esteve (Saint Stephen) outside the town walls. The castle has been documented as early as 1065 AD and it was restored as a luxury hotel in the 1960s. During restoration, traces of settlement were found that date back to the Bronze Age.

Today, Peratallada is known for its old stone buildings, rutted stone streets and passageways. Its proximity to the beaches of the Costa Brava and its numerous restaurants, small boutique hotels and artists' galleries make it a popular destination.

A festival – the Festa Major, is held every year in early August with concerts and activities and there is a medieval festival in the autumn.
