= Forallac =

- Municipality
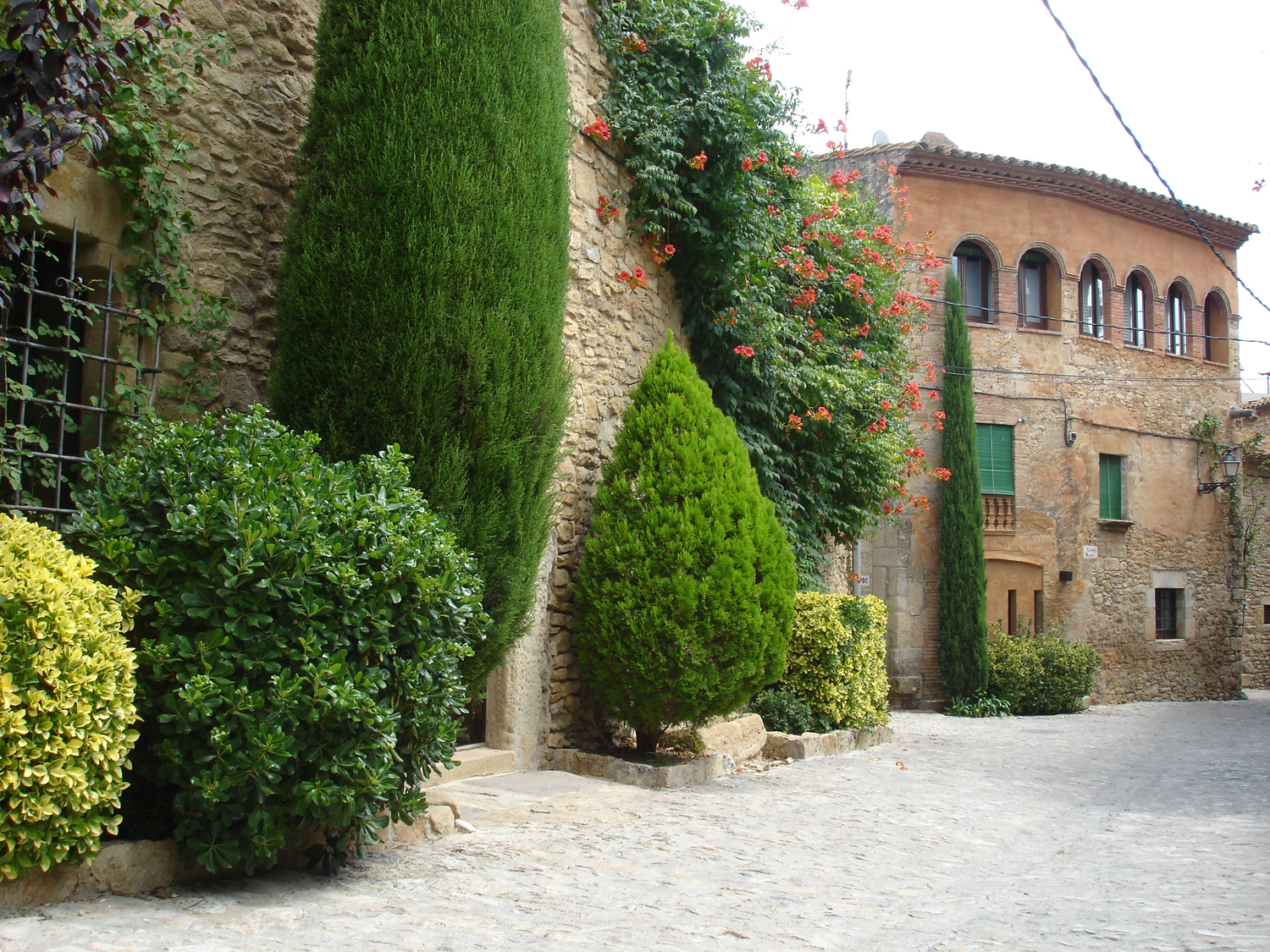

- Flag Coat of arms

- Location in Catalonia Forallac (Spain)
- Coordinates: 41°57′27″N 3°3′24″E
- Country: Spain
- Community: Catalonia
- Province: Girona
- Comarca: Baix Empordà

Government
  - Mayor: Josep Sala Leal (2015)

Area
  - Total: 50.6 km^{2} (19.5 sq mi)

Population (2025-01-01)
  - Total: 1,790
  - Density: 35.4/km^{2} (91.6/sq mi)
- Website: www.forallac.cat

Forallac is a village and municipality in the province of Girona and autonomous community of Catalonia, Spain. The municipality covers an area of 49.97 square kilometres (19.29 sq mi) and the population in 2014 was 1,729. It includes the village of Peratallada.

The name Forallac itself is a portmanteau of the former municipalities of Fonteta, Peratallada and Vulpellac which merged in 1977.

== Subdivisions ==
The municipality is composed of eight distinct settlements:

- la Bordeta (145)
- Canapost (59)
- Fonteta (297)
- Peratallada (222)
- Puig de Sant Ramon (531)
- Sant Climent de Peralta (85)
- Santa Susanna de Peralta (80)
- Vulpellac (326)
