= Pals =

- Municipality
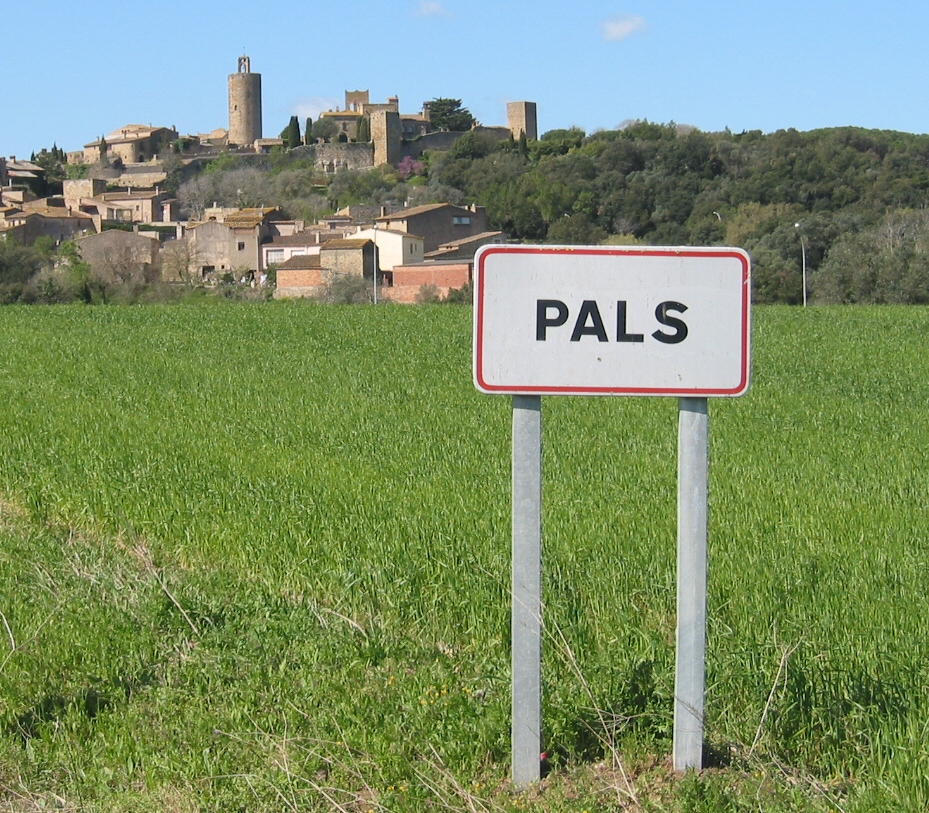

- Flag Coat of arms

- Location within Province of Girona Location within Catalonia Location within Spain
- Coordinates: 41°58′18″N 3°9′0″E
- Country: Spain
- Autonomous community: Catalonia
- Province: Girona
- Comarca: Baix Empordà

Government
  - Mayor: Sílvia Monar Aynier (2015) (ERC)

Area
  - Total: 25.8 km^{2} (10.0 sq mi)
- Elevation: 55 m (180 ft)

Population (2025-01-01)
  - Total: 2,534
  - Density: 98.2/km^{2} (254/sq mi)
- Demonym: Palsencs/Palsenques
- Time zone: UTC+1 (CET)
  - Summer (DST): UTC+2 (CEST)
- Postal code: 17124
- Website: pals.cat

Pals (Catalan pronunciation: [ˈpals]) is a medieval town in Catalonia, northern Spain, a few kilometres from the sea in the heart of the Bay of Emporda on the Costa Brava. It lies on the C31 Palafrugell–L'Estartit road.

The GR 92 long distance footpath, which roughly follows the length of the Mediterranean coast of Spain, passes through the town. Pals lies on an inland stage of the path, between Torroella de Montgrí and Begur. To the north, towards Torroella, the path passes through Palau-sator, and to the south it heads directly to Begur.

== Main sights ==
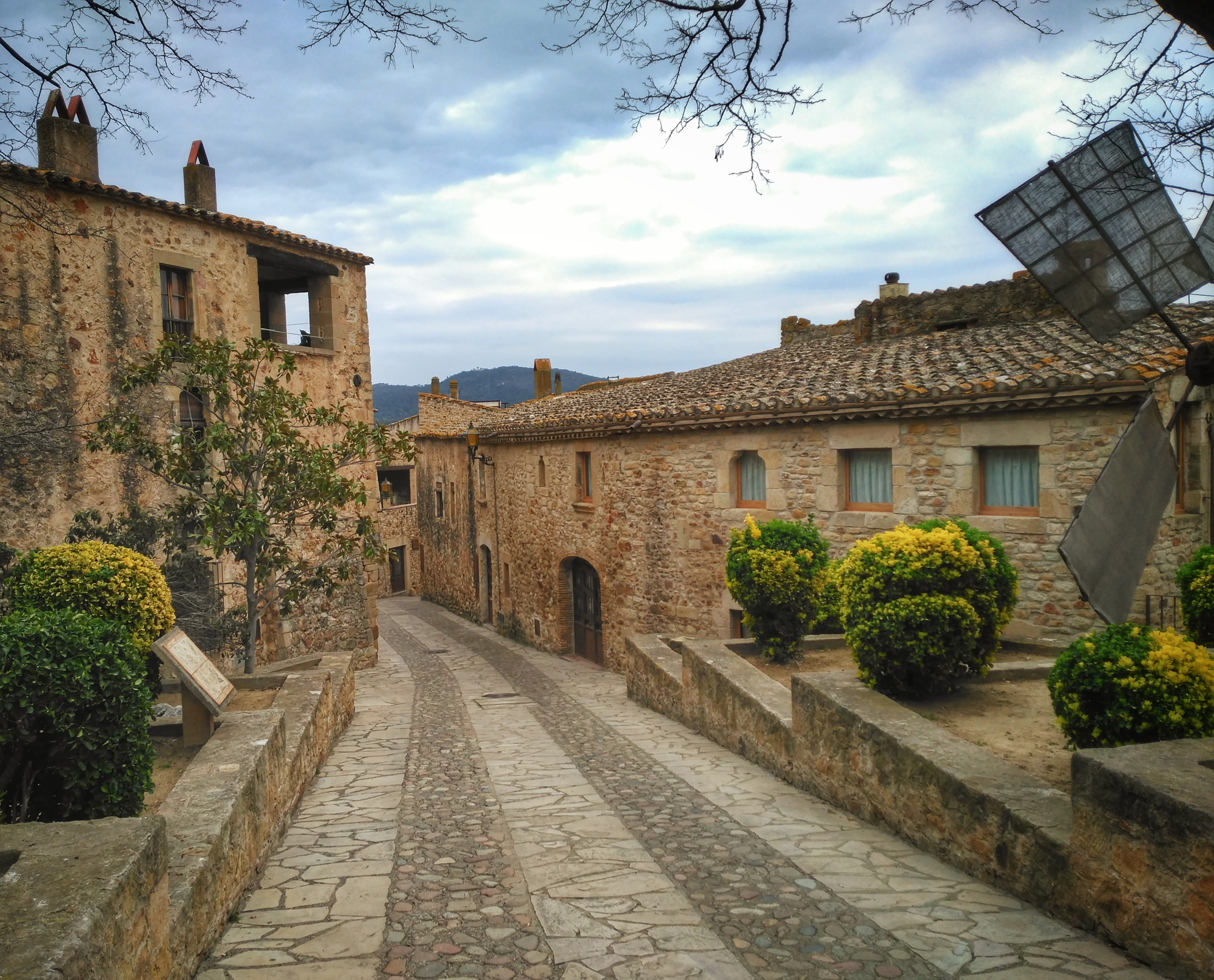
Cobblestone street in the center of Pals

Pals has a historic centre on a hill surrounded by plains with a medieval Romanesque tower built between the 11th and 13th centuries, known as the Torre de les Hores (Tower of the Hours). A clock tower, it is 15 metres (49 ft) high.

The Gothic Quarter of the town has been substantially restored and there are cobbled streets interrupted by semicircular arches, façades with pointed arched windows and stone balconies. The town wall contains four square towers which date from the 4th century. The Josep Pla viewpoint (from which can be seen the fields of Empordà and the Medes Islands), the Plaça Major, the tombs in the Carrer Major and the Romanesque church of Sant Pere are other features of the town. There is an archaeology museum.

On the edge of the main town is Masos de Pals, which has a thriving urban centre and is popular as a location for holiday homes. Platja de Pals ("Pals' Beach") is also a popular holiday location.

== See also ==
- Pals Rice
