= Vilopriu =

- Municipality
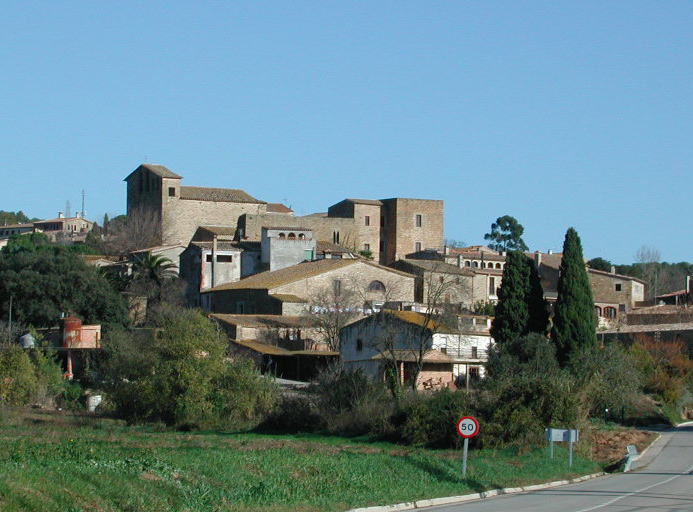
- Vilopriu

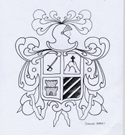
- Coat of arms

- Location in Catalonia Vilopriu (Spain)
- Coordinates: 42°6′N 3°0′E
- Country: Spain
- Community: Catalonia
- Province: Girona
- Comarca: Baix Empordà

Government
  - Mayor: Pere Pulido Buil (2015)

Area
  - Total: 16.4 km^{2} (6.3 sq mi)

Population (2025-01-01)
  - Total: 209
  - Density: 12.7/km^{2} (33.0/sq mi)
- Website: www.vilopriu.cat

Vilopriu (Catalan pronunciation: [biluˈpɾiw]) is a village and municipality in the province of Girona and autonomous community of Catalonia, Spain.

Besides the village of Vilopriu itself, the municipality includes the following populated places:

- Gaüses
- Pins
- Valldevià
