= Vall-llobrega =

- Municipality
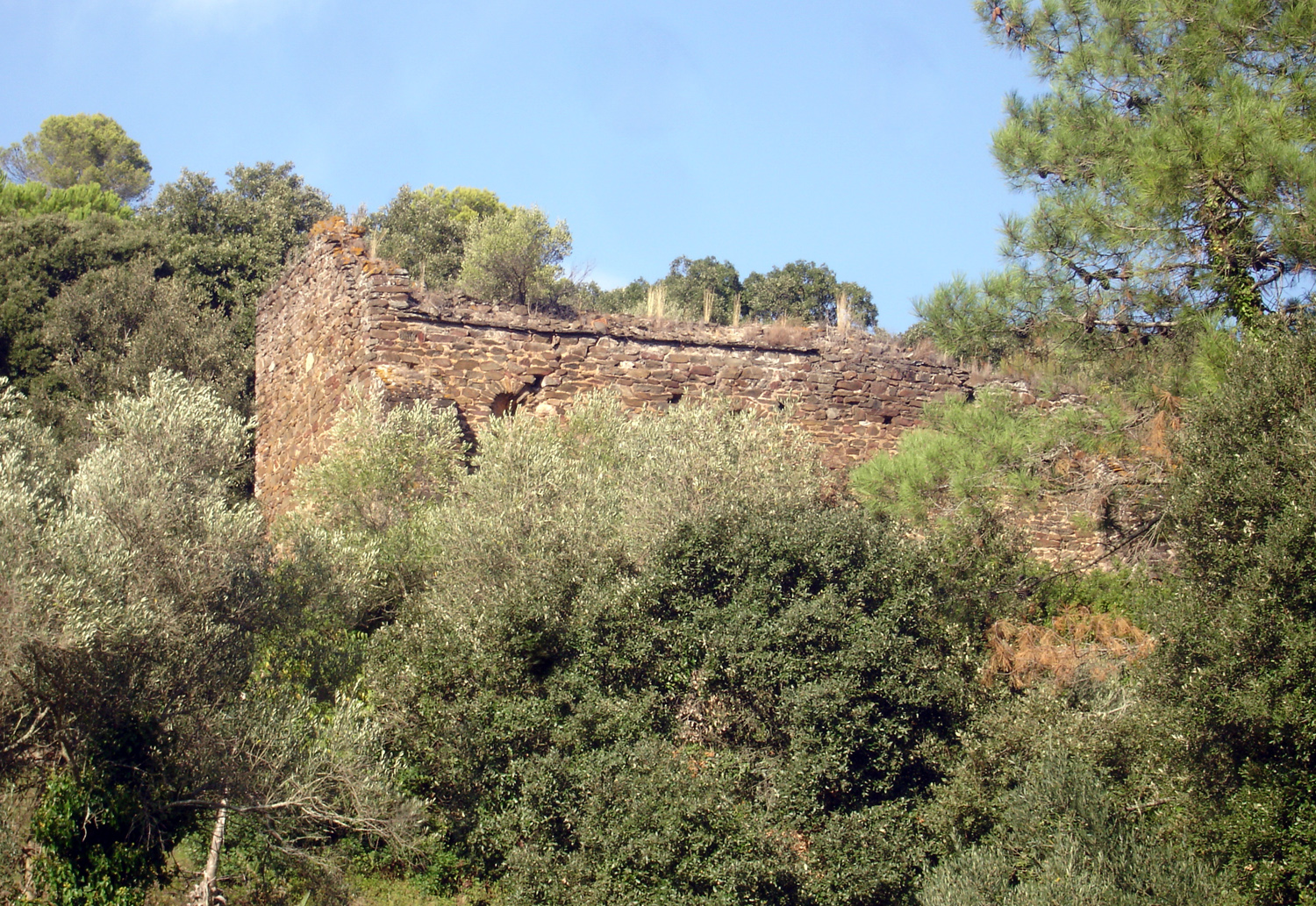
- St. Matthew's church (11th century)

- Flag Coat of arms

- Location in Catalonia Vall-llobrega (Spain)
- Coordinates: 41°53′N 3°8′E
- Country: Spain
- Community: Catalonia
- Province: Girona
- Comarca: Baix Empordà

Government
  - Mayor: Rufino Guirado Iruela (2015)

Area
  - Total: 5.4 km^{2} (2.1 sq mi)

Population (2025-01-01)
  - Total: 891
  - Density: 160/km^{2} (430/sq mi)
- Website: www.vall-llobrega.cat

Vall-llobrega (Catalan pronunciation: [ˌbaʎ.ʎuˈβɾɛɣə]) is a village and municipality in the province of Girona and autonomous community of Catalonia, Spain.

The first evidence of human settlement in the Vall-llobrega area is the Dolmen de Montagut, on the top of Montagut hill between Vall-llobrega and Palamós. Dating from the 3rd or 2nd millennium BC, this has 3 slabs in their original state and the remains of a tomb that these once covered.
