= Mont-ras =

- Municipality
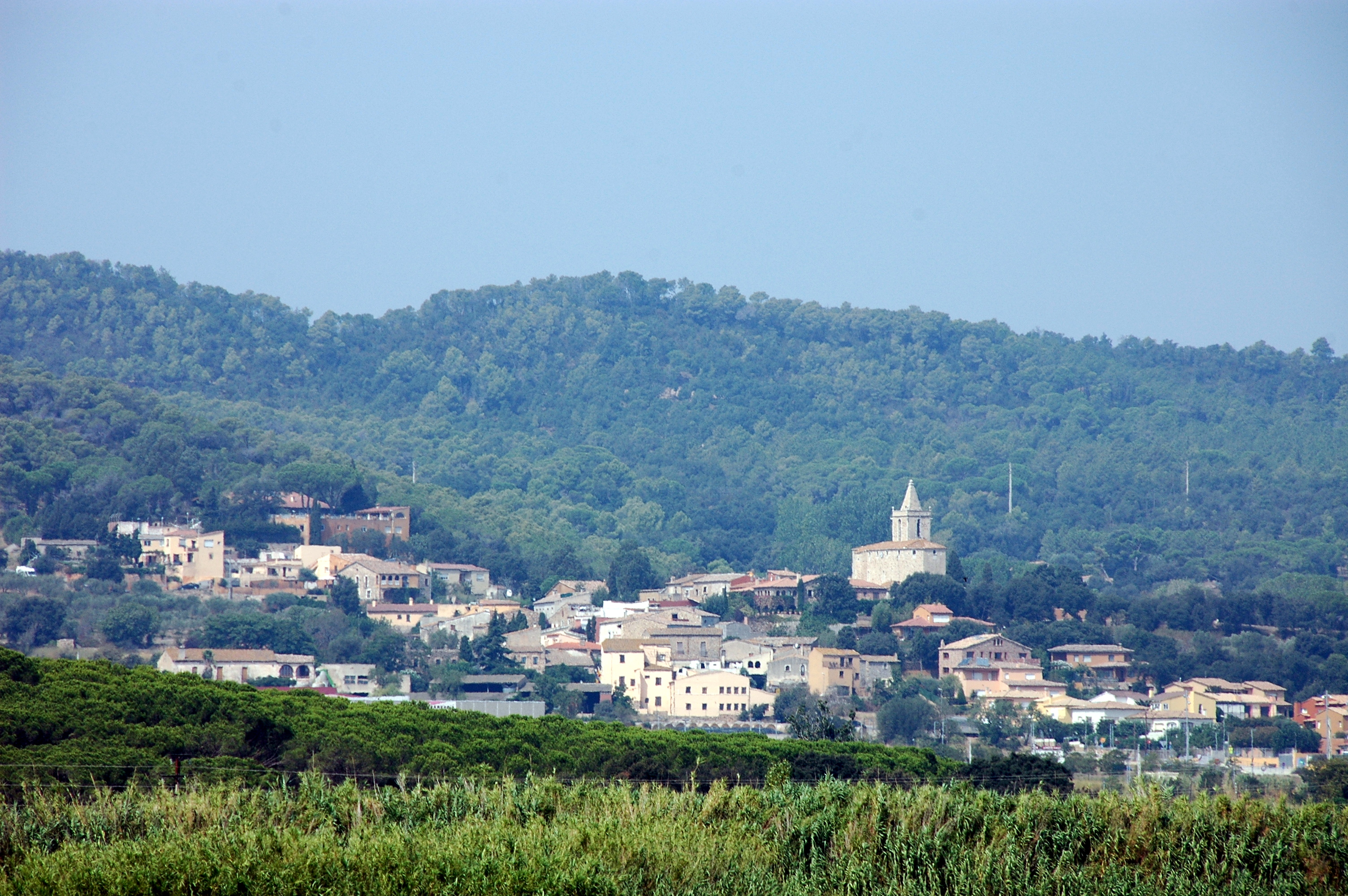
- General view of the village

- Flag Coat of arms

- Location in Catalonia Mont-ras (Spain)
- Coordinates: 41°54′28″N 3°8′39″E
- Country: Spain
- Community: Catalonia
- Province: Girona
- Comarca: Baix Empordà

Government
  - Mayor: Carles Salgas Padrosa (2015)

Area
  - Total: 12.3 km^{2} (4.7 sq mi)
- Elevation: 88 m (289 ft)

Population (2025-01-01)
  - Total: 1,690
  - Density: 137/km^{2} (356/sq mi)
- Postal code: 17253
- Website: www.mont-ras.cat

Mont-ras (Catalan pronunciation: [munˈras]) is a village and rural district situated between the larger towns of Palafrugell and Palamos on the Costa Brava in Baix Emporda, in the province of Girona, Catalonia, Spain. Mont-ras is approximately 40 minutes from Girona, or 80 minutes from Barcelona.

The historic village centre sits just in the initial rise of the Gavarres hills and natural park, while the rest of the district extends across the plain to meet the Mediterranean sea at the rocky bay of El Crit just to the south of Cap Roig looking out to the Formigues Islands. The name Mont(hill)-ras(level) derives from this geographic situation.

Although evidence of human habitation dates back to Roman times, the first mention of Mont-ras Torreolla came in the tenth century in reference to a watchtower that stood in at the approximate location of the current church of Saint Esteve (built 1599). Through the middle-ages Mont-ras was part of the domain of the Barons of Palafrugell and was administered as part of Palafrugell until it became a separate municipality in 1858.

The elevated older village centre includes the church of Saint Esteve and the Ajuntament and a number of historic houses. The village area also includes a sports centre, library, Torre Jonama primary school (not to be confused with a school of the same name in Palafrugell). Recent developments have extended the municipality with the building of urbanisations of Torre Simone, La Roqueta, Molines and Canyelles. There are a number of factories, commercial units and potteries situated along the C31/C66 Palamós to Girona Road.

The municipality includes a number of older fortified masia farms and towers (torres) built against the raiding of the Barbary pirates. The cove of El Crit (The Scream) takes its name from a legend of a local girl killed by pirates.

In the hills behind the village are a number of disused mines and quarries along with cork trees that contributed to the local cork-making industries. The Mont-ras plain includes the Ruta de la Petit Tren walking and cycling route linking Mont-ras with the beaches of La Fosca, Castell and Calella de Palafrugell. As a result, the area is popular with walkers and mountain bikers.

Mont-ras includes a number of campsites and the tennis club Costa Brava. Mont-ras football club is one of the many Costa Brava clubs that host the Mediterranean International Cup youth football tournament each Easter.

== Demography ==
1900	1930	1950	1970	1990	2011
618	626	634	1,040	1,336	1,833
