= Foixà =

- Municipality
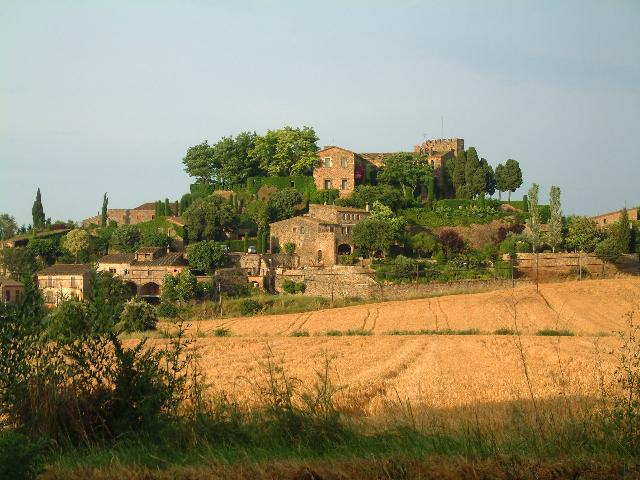

- Flag Coat of arms

- Location in Catalonia Foixà (Spain)
- Coordinates: 42°2′36″N 2°59′52″E
- Country: Spain
- Autonomous community: Catalonia
- Province: Girona
- Comarca: Baix Empordà

Government
  - Mayor: Josep Oliveras Galí (2015)

Area
  - Total: 18.8 km^{2} (7.3 sq mi)
- Elevation: 87 m (285 ft)

Population (2025-01-01)
  - Total: 298
  - Density: 15.9/km^{2} (41.1/sq mi)
- Postal code: 17132
- Official language(s): Catalan, Spanish
- Website: www.foixa.cat

Foixà (Catalan pronunciation: [fuˈʃa]) is a village and municipality in the comarca (county) of the Baix Empordà.

== Geography ==
The rural village of Foixà stretches from the right bank to the lower basin of the Ter (river). It is divided into two main sections: la Vila (the village), which surrounds the old 13th century Castle of Foixà atop a hill, and L'Església (the church), near the parish church, of a less dense population.

The stream Foixà provides water to the village and empties into the Daró after Fontanilles, passing Ultramort and the Daró Mountains. The forests that surround it (about 1000 ha) are inhabited mainly by oaks and pines.

== History ==
The first documentation found dates from 1019, when it belonged to the county of Empúries, just on the western edge and bordering the county of Girona. This fact gave rise to many armed conflicts. Foixà also suffered disputes between the counts of Empúries and the kings during the reigns of James II of Urgell and Peter IV of Aragon. Records show that in 1359, Bernat Alemany d'Orriols, cousin to queen Sibila of Fortia, came into discord with the count John I of Empúries starting an open war to the point that the count besieged the castle. Peter IV then intervened in favor of his wife's relative and John I was forced to sign a humiliating truce at his castle in Bellcaire.

Legend has it that King John I of Aragon died suddenly on May 19, 1396, while hunting in the forests of Foixà. On the road leading from the castle to the church is a cross-shaped monument which tells the tale.

== Places of interest ==
- Parish Church of Sant Joan de Foixà
- Castle of Foixà
- Church of Sant Llorenç de les Arenes
- Sant Romà de les Arenes
- Sant Sebastià de les Arenes

== Economy ==
Agriculture is mainly rainfed: cereals (26 ha), grain, potatoes and vineyards. The irrigated land occupies only 10 ha of vegetables. Livestock, pigs, sheep rearing and poultry complement the region's economy.

Foixà has a small private airfield called Sierras de Foixà.

== Festivals and traditions ==
Local holidays: January 17 and August 29.

== Cuisine ==
In 1986 Georgina Regàs published a book entitled La cuina de festa major i altres plats de la Lola de Foixà, amb dibuixos d'Opisso (Festival cuisine and other dishes of the Lola of Foixà, art by Opisso), which details how this coquessa, traveling cook, cooked going from house to house, party to party, preparing meals. In it you'll find stuffed apples, stuffed chicken necks, platillos, goose with turnips, brunyolas (as donuts are called in the region) ...
