= Albons =

- Municipality
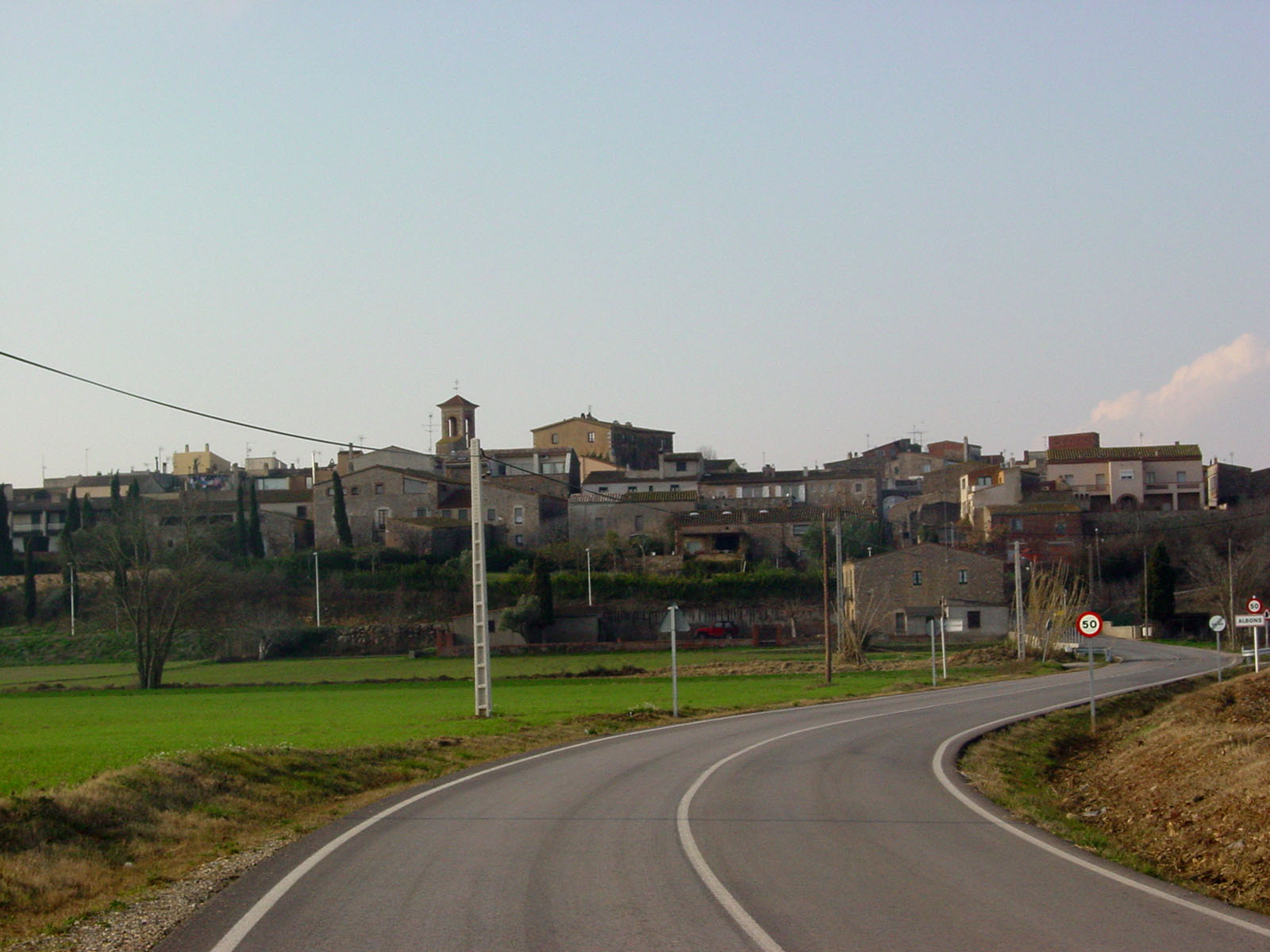

- Flag Coat of arms

- Location in Catalonia Albons (Spain)
- Coordinates: 42°6′31″N 3°4′52″E
- Country: Spain
- Community: Catalonia
- Province: Girona
- Comarca: Baix Empordà

Government
  - Mayor: Joan Hostench Doñabeitia (2015)

Area
  - Total: 11.1 km^{2} (4.3 sq mi)

Population (2025-01-01)
  - Total: 845
  - Density: 76.1/km^{2} (197/sq mi)
- Demonym: Albonenc
- Postal code: 17136
- Website: www.albons.cat

Albons (Catalan pronunciation: [əlˈβons]) is a municipality in Catalonia, Spain.
