= Begur, Spain =

Begur
- Municipality
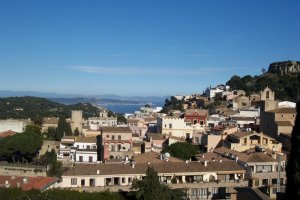
- Town of Begur (with view of Bay of Estartit)

- Flag Coat of arms

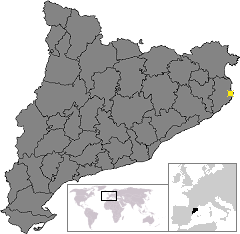
- Coordinates: 41°57′N 3°13′E
- Country: Spain
- Autonomous community: Catalonia
- Province: Girona
- Comarca: Baix Empordà

Government
  - mayor: María Teresa Selva Huertas (2019)

Area
  - Total: 20.7 km^{2} (8.0 sq mi)
- Elevation: 200 m (660 ft)

Population (2025-01-01)
  - Total: 4,291
  - Density: 207/km^{2} (537/sq mi)
- Postal code: 17255
- Website: begur.cat

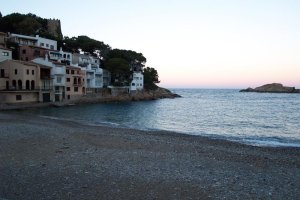
Sa Tuna beach, near Begur

Begur (Catalan pronunciation: [bəˈɣu]) is a village and municipality in the comarca of Baix Empordà and province of Girona in Catalonia, Spain. The village itself lies some 2 kilometres (1.2 mi) from, and 200 metres (660 ft) above, the coastline of the Costa Brava, but the municipality includes several seaside resorts.

The municipality of Begur has 3,986 inhabitants (according to the census of 2005). It is an important tourist attraction in the Baix Empordà. During the summer, the population can exceed 40,000 people.

Despite its tourist character, the village has important historical remnants that go back in early history. The castle of Begur is a good example of medieval remains. The castle was constructed in the 16th and 17th centuries.

The municipality of Begur also includes Esclanyà (with a Romanesque old part), Aiguafreda, Sa Riera, Sa Tuna, Aiguablava and Fornells. Some of the most prestigious beaches of the Costa Brava can be found here: Sa Riera, Aiguafreda, sa Tuna, Platja Fonda (although it has been almost completely destroyed by storms), Fornells and Aiguablava. The latter is also home to a Parador Hotel.

The annual festival to celebrate St. Tania takes places each November.

The village of Begur is a staging point on the GR 92 long-distance footpath, which runs the length of the Mediterranean coast of Spain. Stage 7, to the north, takes an inland route via Pals, Palau-sator, Fontanilles and Gualta to the next staging point at Torroella de Montgrí, a distance of 21.3 kilometres (13.2 mi). Stage 8, to the south, heads to Sa Tuna and Fornells de Mar before following the coast further south through Tamariu, Llafranc and Calella de Palafrugell to the next staging point at Palamós, a distance of 23.0 kilometres (14.3 mi).

== Geography ==
Besides the village of Begur itself, the municipality includes the following populated places:

- Aiguablava
- Aiguafreda
- Agua Xelida
- Esclanyà
- Fornells
- Sa Riera
- Sa Tuna
