= Serra de Daró =

- Municipality
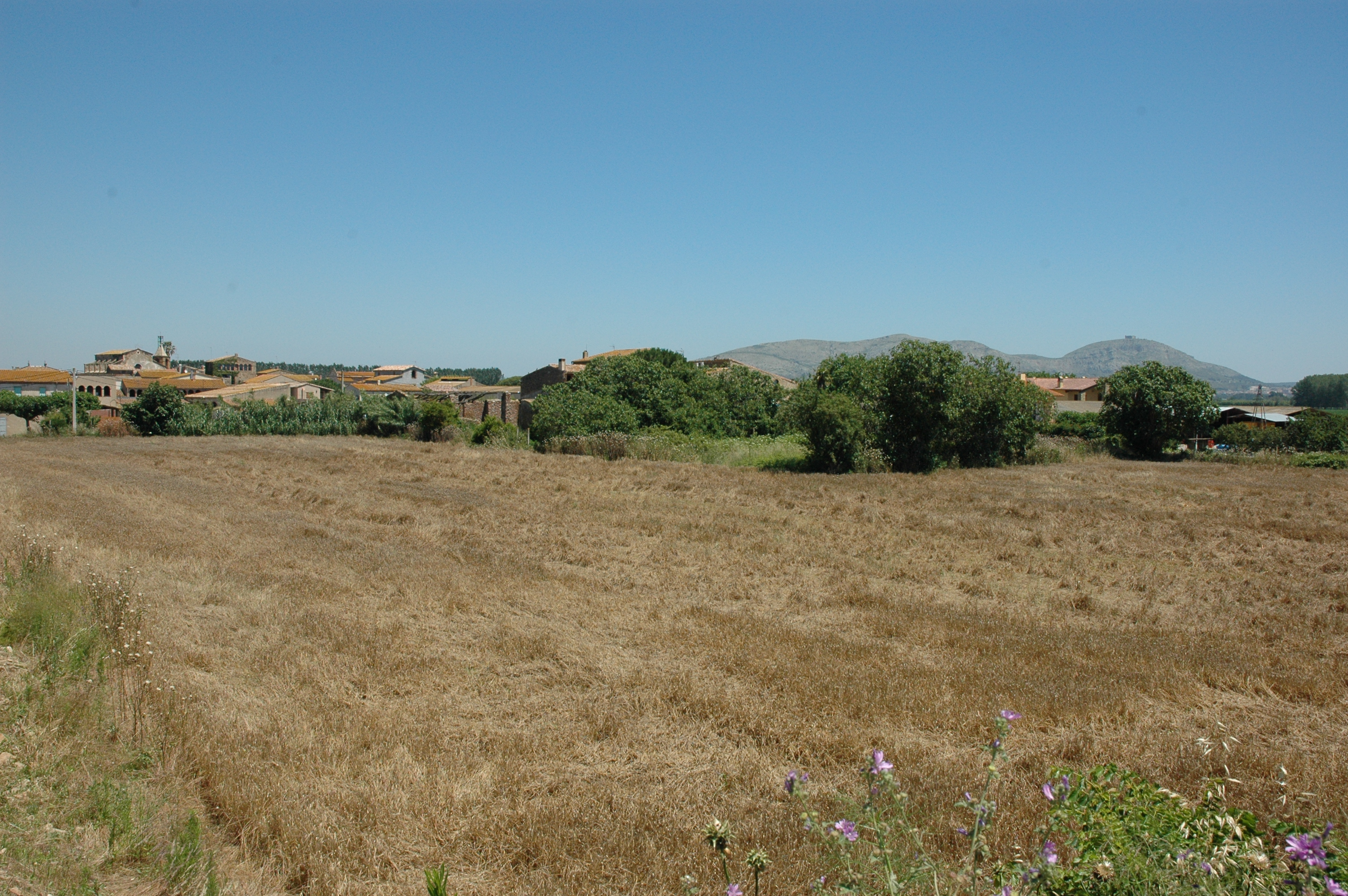
- Serra de Daró with the Montgrí Massif in the background

- Flag Coat of arms

- Location in Catalonia Serra de Daró (Spain)
- Coordinates: 42°1′46″N 3°04′25″E
- Country: Spain
- Community: Catalonia
- Province: Girona
- Comarca: Baix Empordà

Government
  - Mayor: Josep Puig Ribas (2015)

Area
  - Total: 7.9 km^{2} (3.1 sq mi)
- Elevation: 15 m (49 ft)

Population (2025-01-01)
  - Total: 240
  - Density: 30/km^{2} (79/sq mi)
- Demonym: Serranenc
- Postal code: 17133
- Website: www.serradedaro.cat

Serra de Daró (Catalan pronunciation: [ˈsɛrə ðə ðəˈɾo]) is a municipality in Catalonia, Spain. Documented since 1017, it is located in the Daró river valley.
