= Jafre =

- Municipality
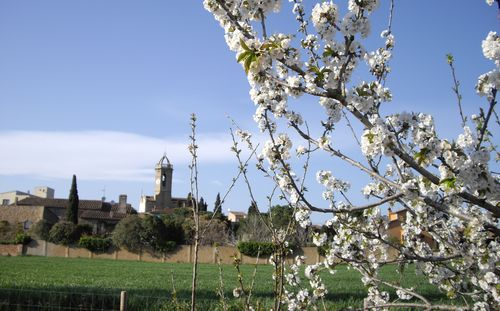
- Jafre

- Coat of arms

- Location in Catalonia Jafre (Spain)
- Coordinates: 42°4′N 3°1′E
- Country: Spain
- Community: Catalonia
- Province: Girona
- Comarca: Baix Empordà

Government
  - Mayor: Nuria Berga Ferrer (2015)

Area
  - Total: 6.6 km^{2} (2.5 sq mi)

Population (2025-01-01)
  - Total: 386
  - Density: 58/km^{2} (150/sq mi)
- Website: www.jafre.cat

Jafre (Catalan pronunciation: [ˈʒafɾə]) is a village in Girona, within the Autonomous Community of Catalonia, Spain. The municipality covers an area of 6.63 square kilometres (2.56 sq mi) and the population in 2014 was 396.
