= Garrigoles =

- Municipality
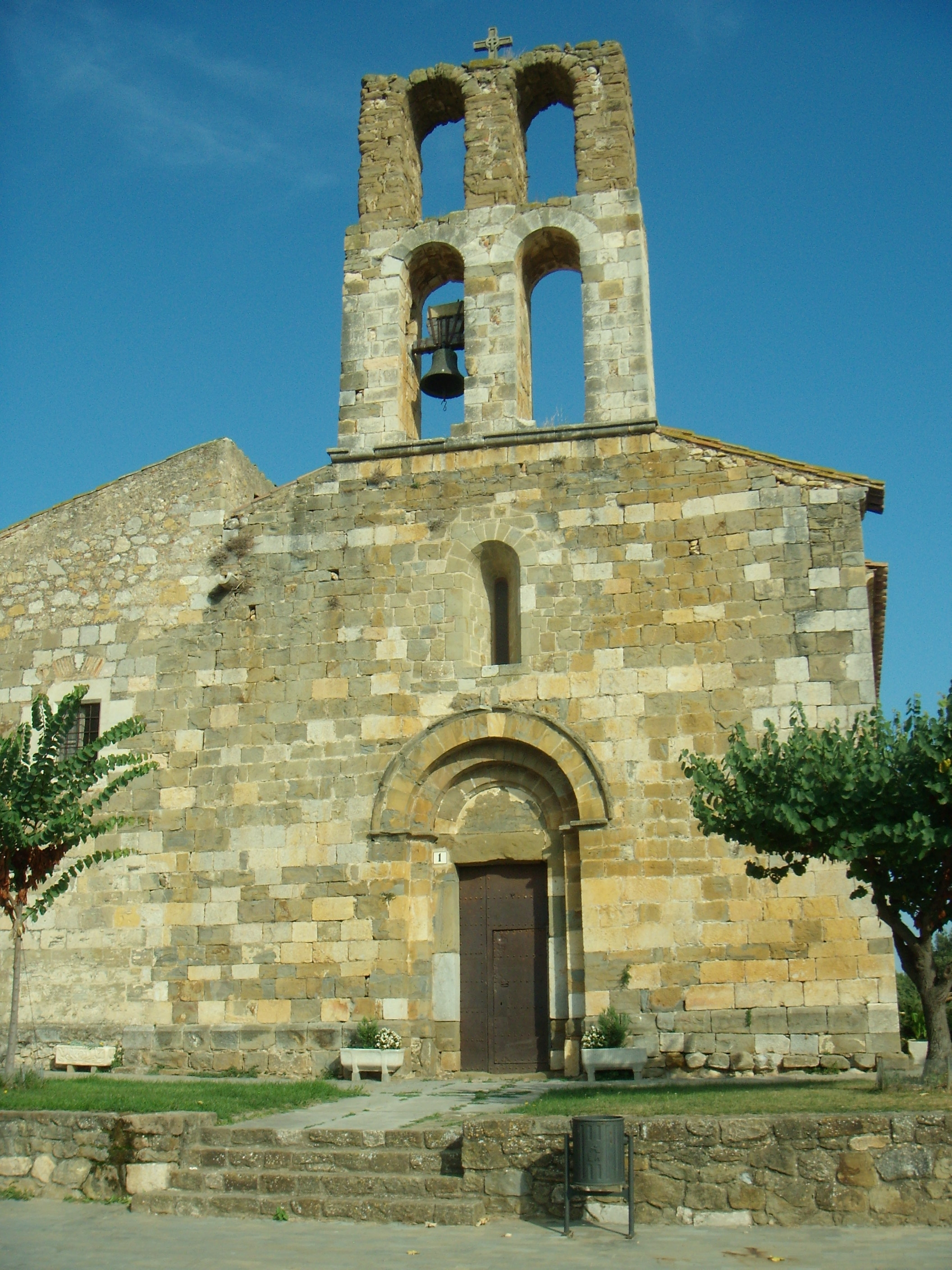
- St. Sadurní church, Garrigoles

- Location in Catalonia Garrigoles (Spain)
- Coordinates: 42°6′35″N 3°1′58″E
- Country: Spain
- Community: Catalonia
- Province: Girona
- Comarca: Baix Empordà

Government
  - Mayor: Josep Gibert Martí (2015)

Area
  - Total: 9.4 km^{2} (3.6 sq mi)

Population (2025-01-01)
  - Total: 182
  - Density: 19/km^{2} (50/sq mi)
- Website: www.garrigoles.cat

Garrigoles (Catalan pronunciation: [gəriˈɣoləs]) is a village in the province of Girona and autonomous community of Catalonia, Spain. The municipality covers an area of 9.4 square kilometres (3.6 sq mi) and the population in 2014 was 159.
