= La Tallada d'Empordà =

- Municipality
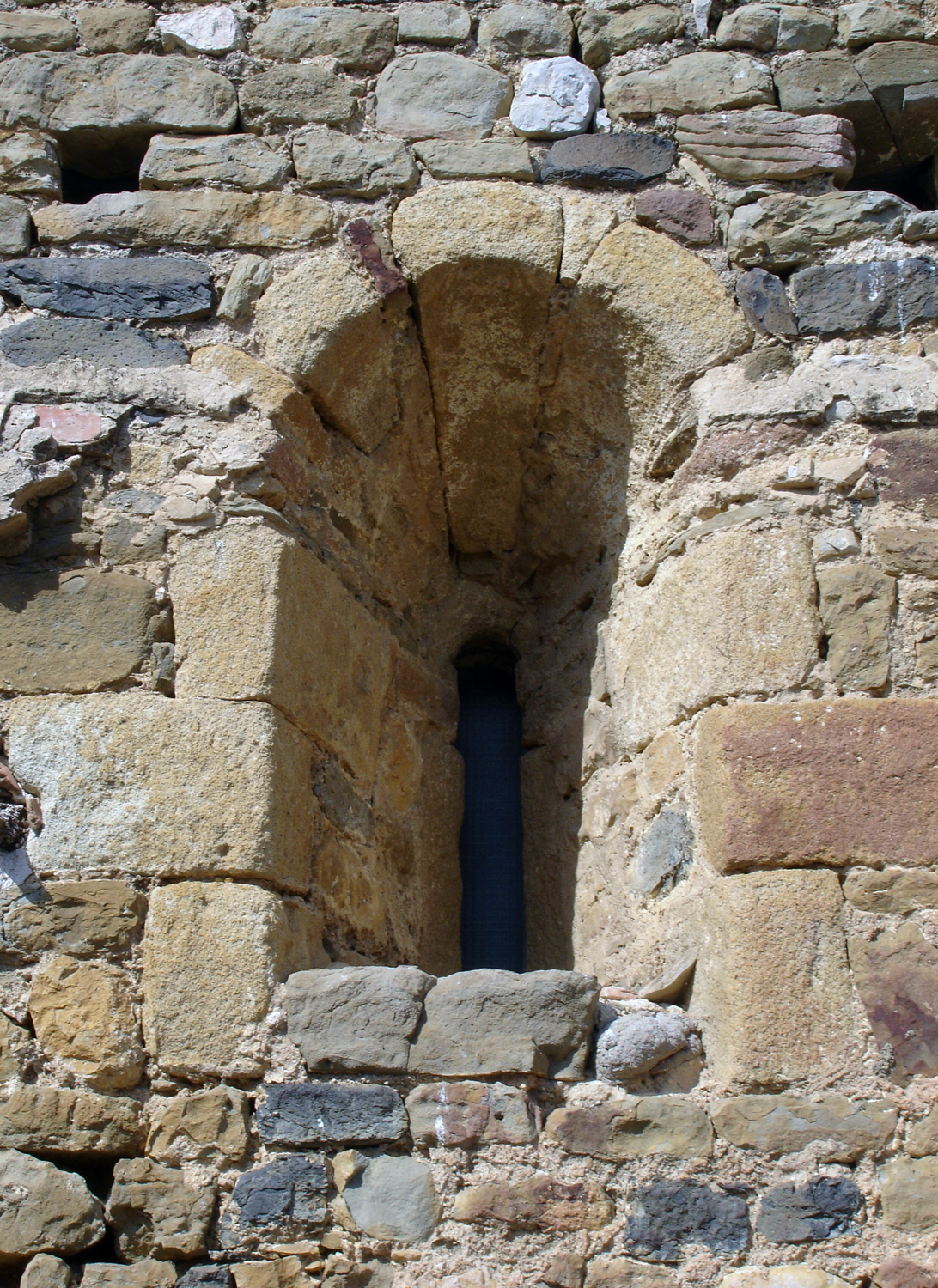
- St. Stephen's church, Maranyà

- Flag Coat of arms

- Location in Catalonia La Tallada d'Empordà (Spain)
- Coordinates: 42°4′53″N 3°3′21″E
- Country: Spain
- Community: Catalonia
- Province: Girona
- Comarca: Baix Empordà

Government
  - Mayor: Josep Ferrer Vilavella (2015)

Area
  - Total: 16.6 km^{2} (6.4 sq mi)
- Elevation: 20 m (66 ft)

Population (2025-01-01)
  - Total: 490
  - Density: 30/km^{2} (76/sq mi)
- Demonym: Talladenc
- Postal code: 17134
- Website: www.latallada.cat

La Tallada d'Empordà (Catalan pronunciation: [lə təˈʎaðə ðəmpuɾˈða]) is a village in the province of Girona and autonomous community of Catalonia, Spain.
