= Torrent, Girona =

Torrent
- Municipality
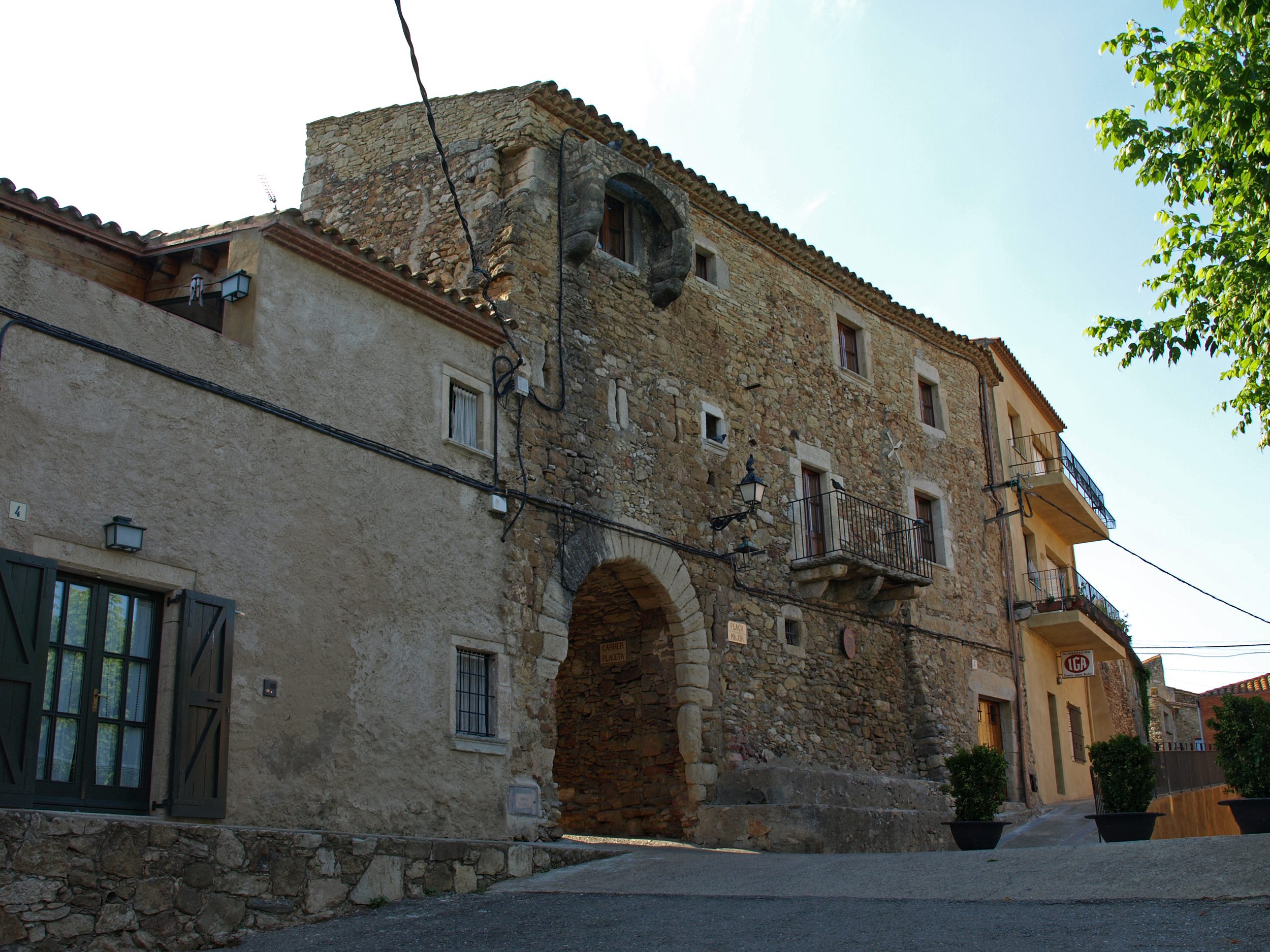
- Torrent castle

- Flag Coat of arms

- Location in Catalonia Torrent (Spain)
- Coordinates: 41°57′9″N 3°7′40″E
- Country: Spain
- Community: Catalonia
- Province: Girona
- Comarca: Baix Empordà

Government
  - Mayor: Josep Maria Ros Marull (2015)

Area
  - Total: 8.0 km^{2} (3.1 sq mi)

Population (2025-01-01)
  - Total: 182
  - Density: 23/km^{2} (59/sq mi)
- Website: www.torrent.cat

Torrent (Catalan pronunciation: [tuˈren]) is a village and municipality in the comarca of Baix Empordà, province of Girona and autonomous community of Catalonia, Spain.
