= Ullà =

- Municipality
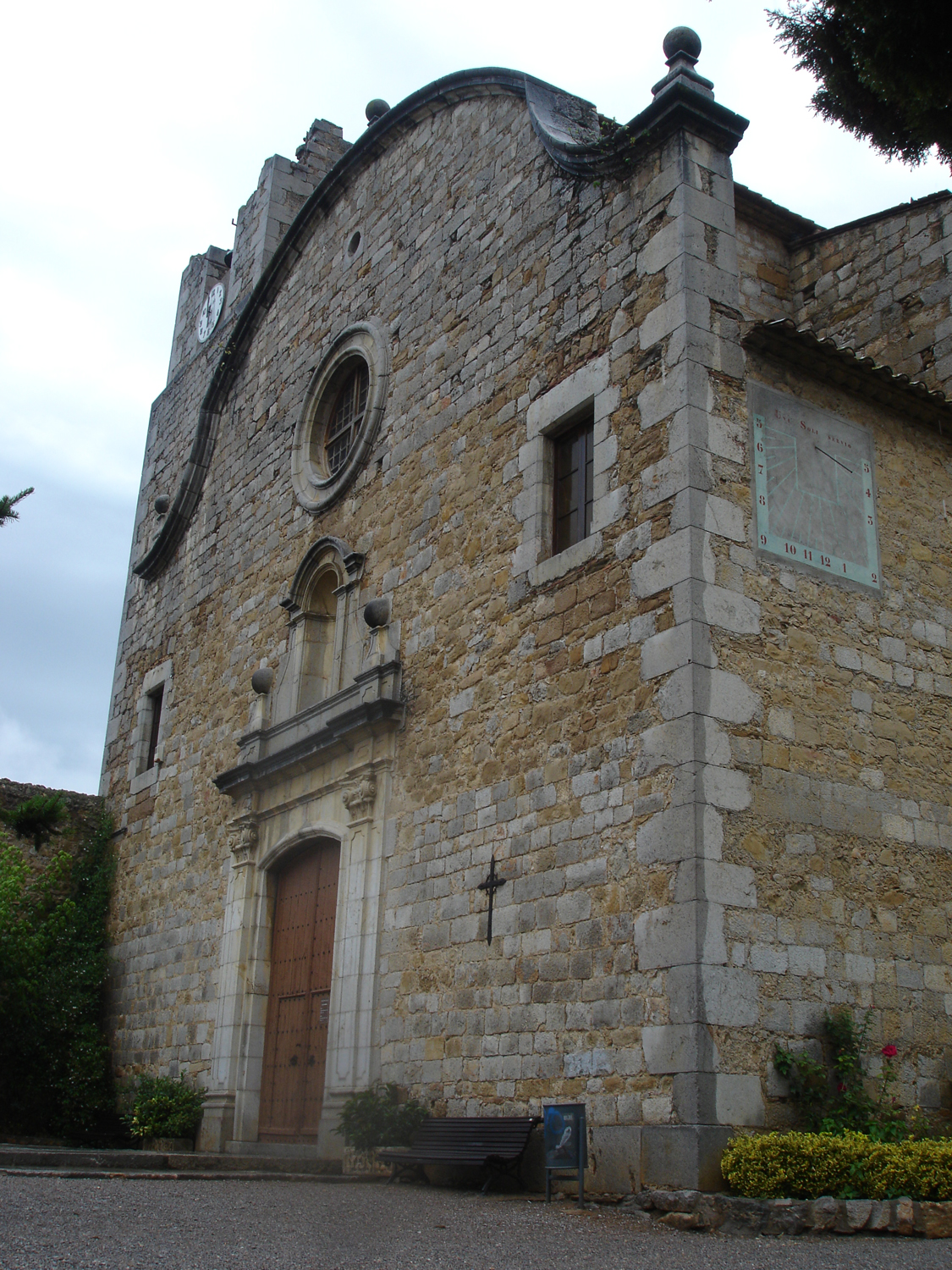
- St. Mary's monastery, Ullà

- Flag Coat of arms

- Location in Catalonia Ullà (Spain)
- Coordinates: 42°3′9″N 3°6′33″E
- Country: Spain
- Community: Catalonia
- Province: Girona
- Comarca: Baix Empordà

Government
  - Mayor: Josep López Ruiz (2015)

Area
  - Total: 7.3 km^{2} (2.8 sq mi)

Population (2025-01-01)
  - Total: 1,258
  - Density: 170/km^{2} (450/sq mi)
- Website: webspobles2.ddgi.cat/ulla

Ullà (Catalan pronunciation: [uˈʎa]) is a village in the province of Girona and autonomous community of Catalonia, Spain.

== Population ==
Catalonia according to statistics more than 39% of the population is of North African origin and Ecuador.
