= Fontanilles =

- Municipality
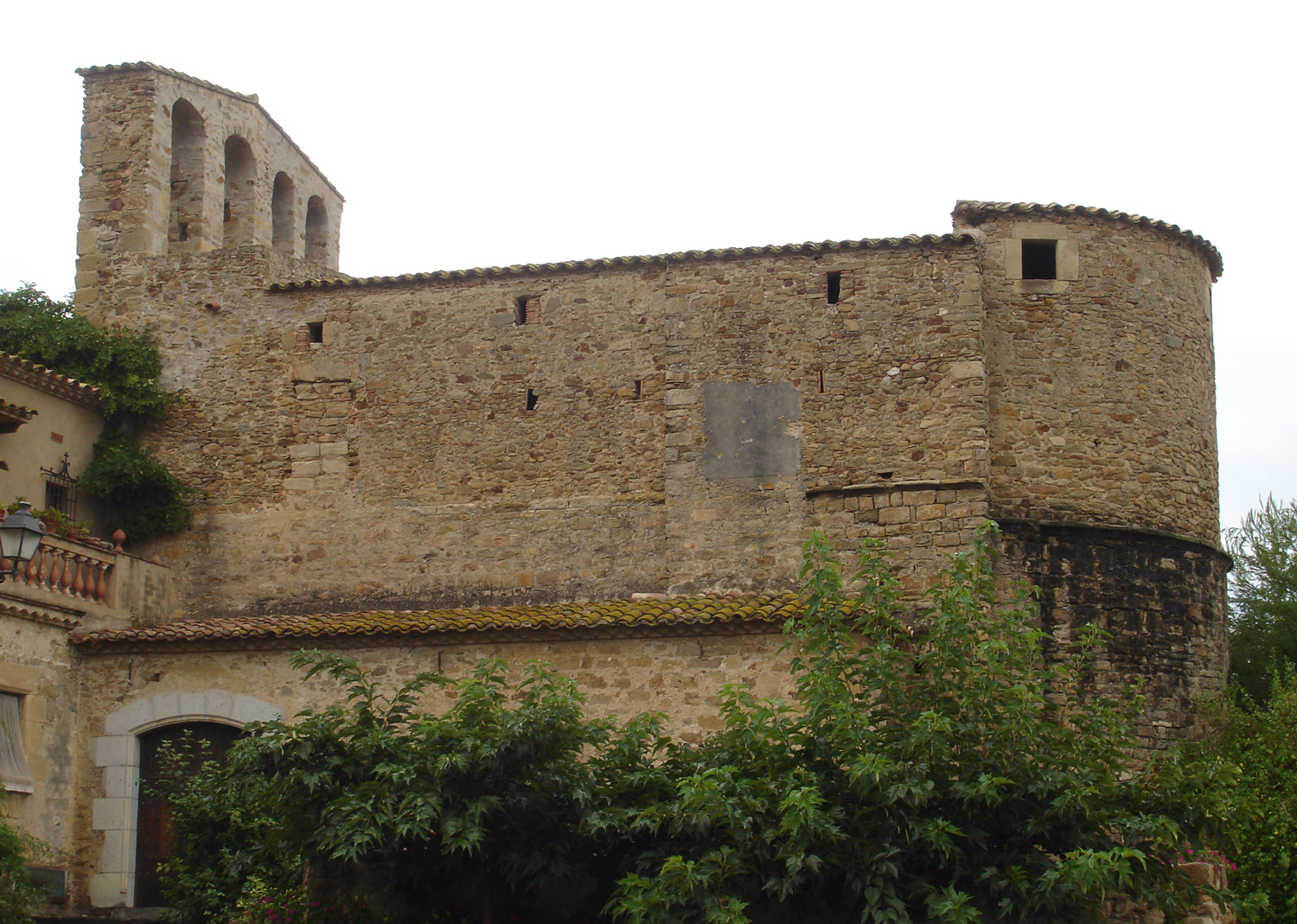
- St. Martin's church, Fontanilles (12th century)

- Coat of arms

- Location in Catalonia Fontanilles (Spain)
- Coordinates: 42°0′43″N 3°6′29″E
- Country: Spain
- Community: Catalonia
- Province: Girona
- Comarca: Baix Empordà

Government
  - Mayor: Salvador Coll Serra (2015)

Area
  - Total: 9.3 km^{2} (3.6 sq mi)

Population (2025-01-01)
  - Total: 171
  - Density: 18/km^{2} (48/sq mi)
- Website: www.ajfontanilles.cat

Fontanilles (Catalan pronunciation: [funtəˈniʎəs]) is a village in the province of Girona and autonomous community of Catalonia, Spain. The municipality covers an area of 9.29 square kilometres (3.59 sq mi) and the population in 2014 was 160.

The GR 92 long-distance footpath, which roughly follows the length of the Mediterranean coast of Spain, passes through the village. Fontanilles lies on an inland stage of the path, between Torroella de Montgrí and Begur. To the north, towards Torroella, the path passes through Gualta, and to the south, it passes through Palau-sator.
