= Parlavà =

- Municipality
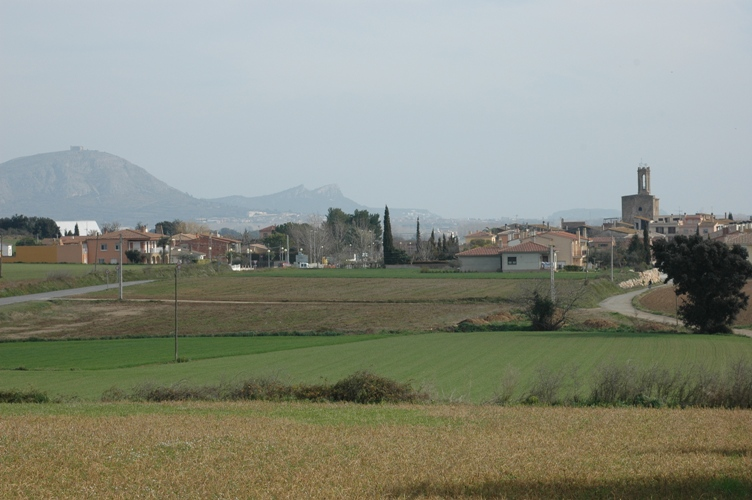
- Parlavà

- Flag Coat of arms

- Location in Catalonia Parlavà (Spain)
- Coordinates: 42°1′28″N 3°1′56″E
- Country: Spain
- Community: Catalonia
- Province: Girona
- Comarca: Baix Empordà

Government
  - Mayor: Joaquim Sabrià Pujol (2015)

Area
  - Total: 6.2 km^{2} (2.4 sq mi)

Population (2025-01-01)
  - Total: 432
  - Density: 70/km^{2} (180/sq mi)
- Website: www.parlava.cat

Parlavà (Catalan pronunciation: [pəɾləˈβa]) is a village in the province of Girona and autonomous community of Catalonia, Spain. The municipality covers an area of 6.17 square kilometres (2.38 sq mi) and the population in 2014 was 410.
