= Regencós =

- Municipality
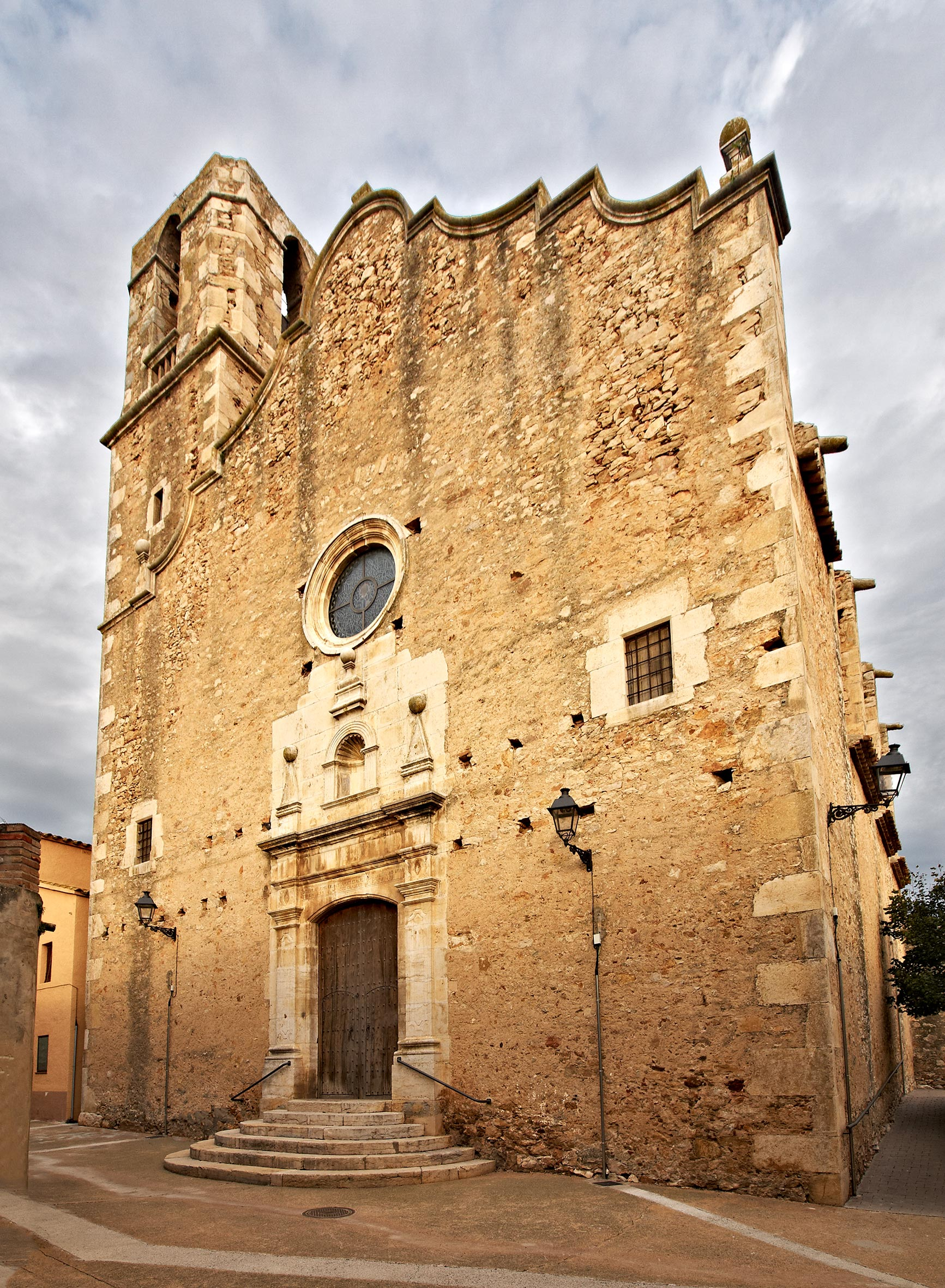
- St. Vincent's church, Regencós

- Flag Coat of arms

- Location in Catalonia Regencós (Spain)
- Coordinates: 41°57′N 3°10′E
- Country: Spain
- Community: Catalonia
- Province: Girona
- Comarca: Baix Empordà

Government
  - Mayor: Maria Pilar Pagés Andrés (2015)

Area
  - Total: 6.3 km^{2} (2.4 sq mi)

Population (2025-01-01)
  - Total: 275
  - Density: 44/km^{2} (110/sq mi)
- Website: www.regencos.cat

Regencós (Catalan pronunciation: [rəʒəŋˈkos]) is a village in the province of Girona and autonomous community of Catalonia, Spain. The municipality covers an area of 6.23 square kilometres (2.41 sq mi) and the population in 2014 was 291.
