= Colomers =

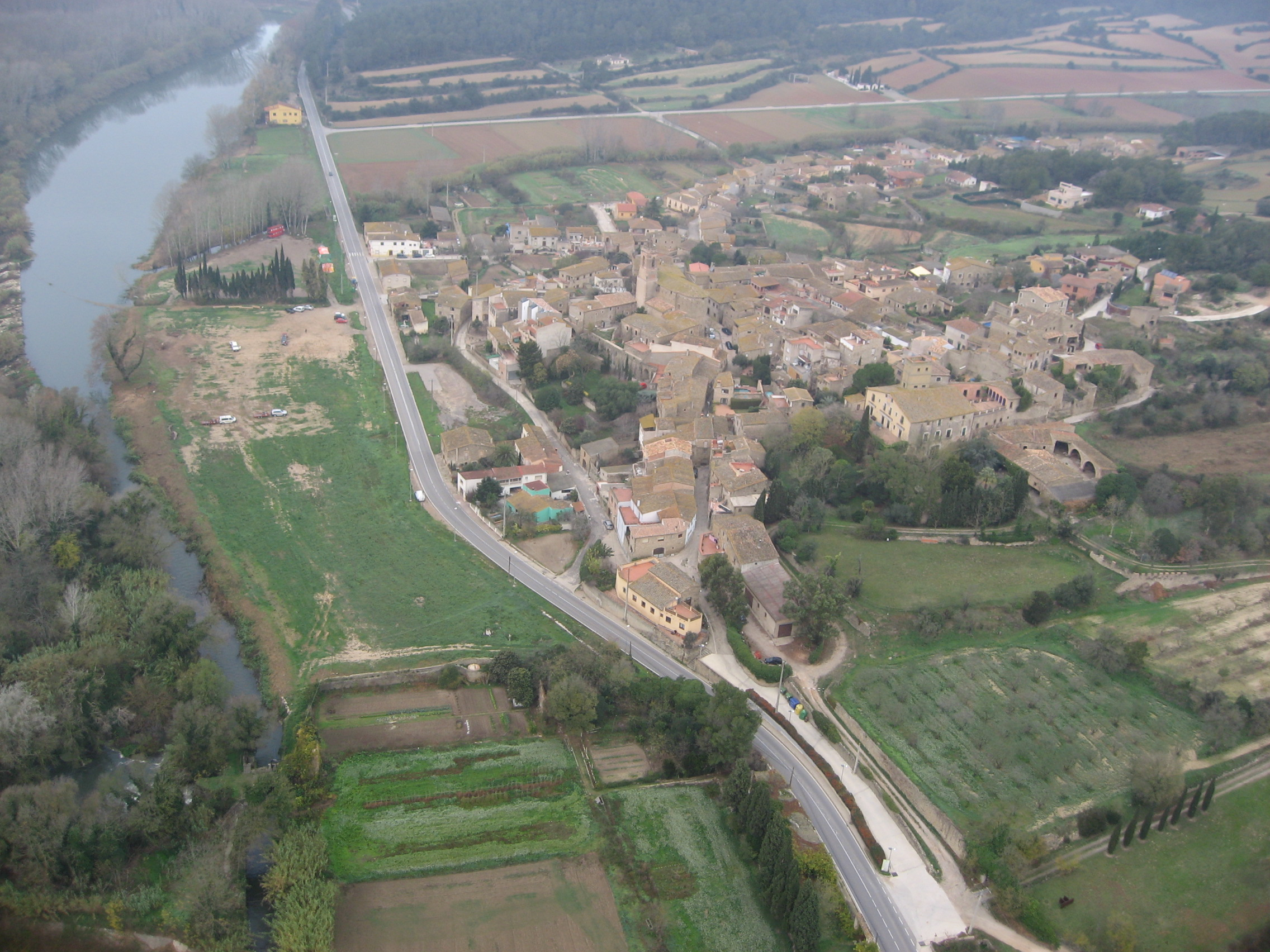
- Colomers

- Coat of arms

- Location in Catalonia Colomers (Spain)
- Coordinates: 42°5′10″N 2°59′18″E
- Country: Spain
- Community: Catalonia
- Province: Girona
- Comarca: Baix Empordà

Government
  - Mayor: Josep Manel López Gifreu (2015)

Area
  - Total: 4.4 km^{2} (1.7 sq mi)

Population (2025-01-01)
  - Total: 208
  - Density: 47/km^{2} (120/sq mi)
- Website: www.colomers.cat

Colomers (Catalan pronunciation: [kuluˈmes]) is a municipality in the province of Girona and autonomous community of Catalonia, Spain. The municipality covers an area of 4.3 square kilometres (1.7 sq mi) and the population in 2014 was 195.
