= Gualta =

- Municipality
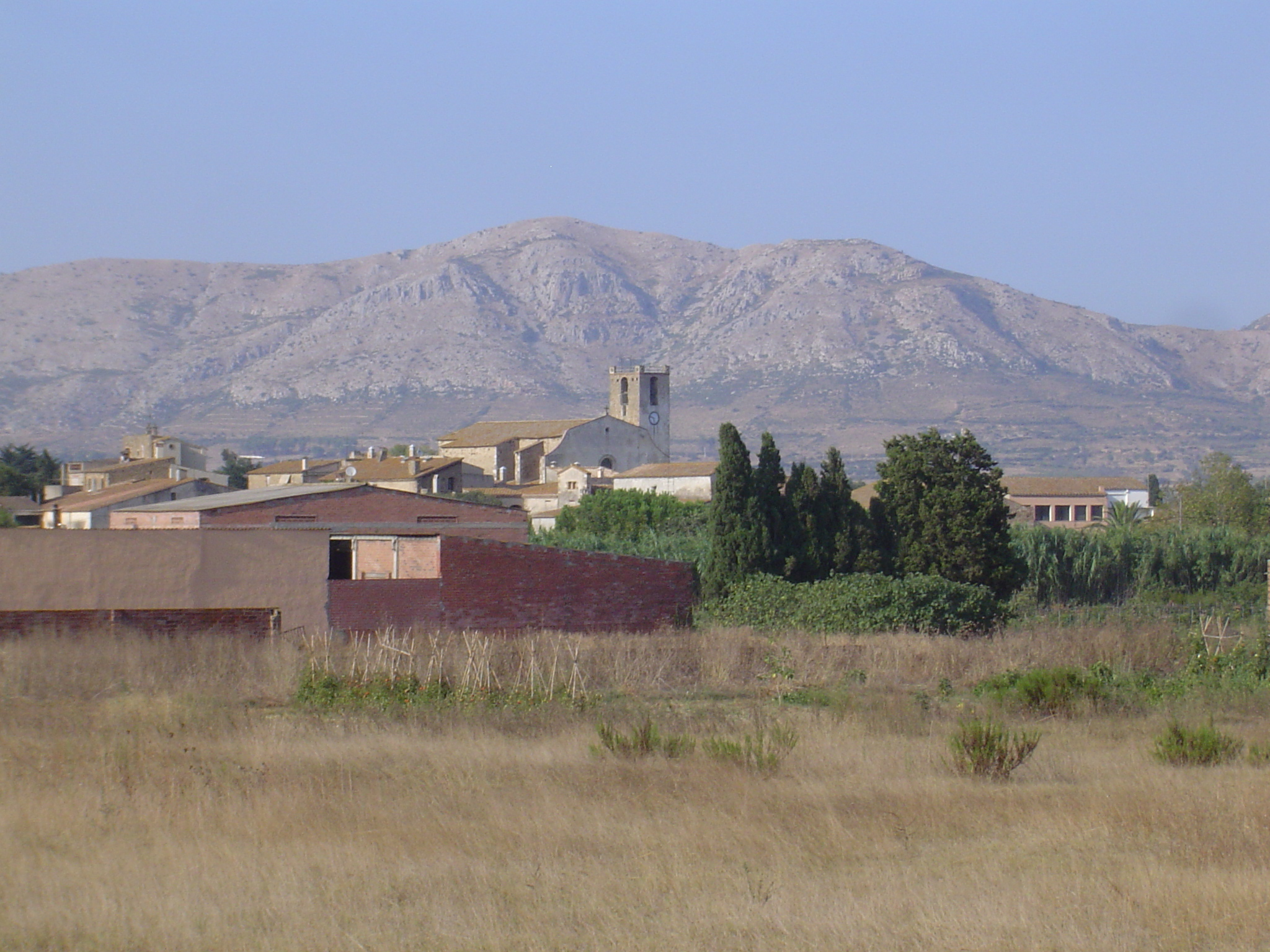
- Gualta

- Flag Coat of arms

- Location in Catalonia Gualta (Spain)
- Coordinates: 42°1′49″N 3°6′17″E
- Country: Spain
- Community: Catalonia
- Province: Girona
- Comarca: Baix Empordà

Government
  - Mayor: Jaume Fontdevila Tarabal (2015)

Area
  - Total: 9.0 km^{2} (3.5 sq mi)

Population (2025-01-01)
  - Total: 438
  - Density: 49/km^{2} (130/sq mi)
- Website: www.gualta.cat

Gualta (Catalan pronunciation: [ˈgwaltə]) is a village in the province of Girona and autonomous community of Catalonia, Spain. The municipality covers an area of 9 square kilometres (3.5 sq mi) and the population in 2014 was 362.

The GR 92 long distance footpath, which roughly follows the length of the Mediterranean coast of Spain, passes through the village. Gualta lies on an inland stage of the path, between Torroella de Montgrí and Begur. To the north the path heads directly towards Torroella across the Ter river, and to the south it passes through Fontanilles.
