= Bellcaire d'Empordà =

- Municipality
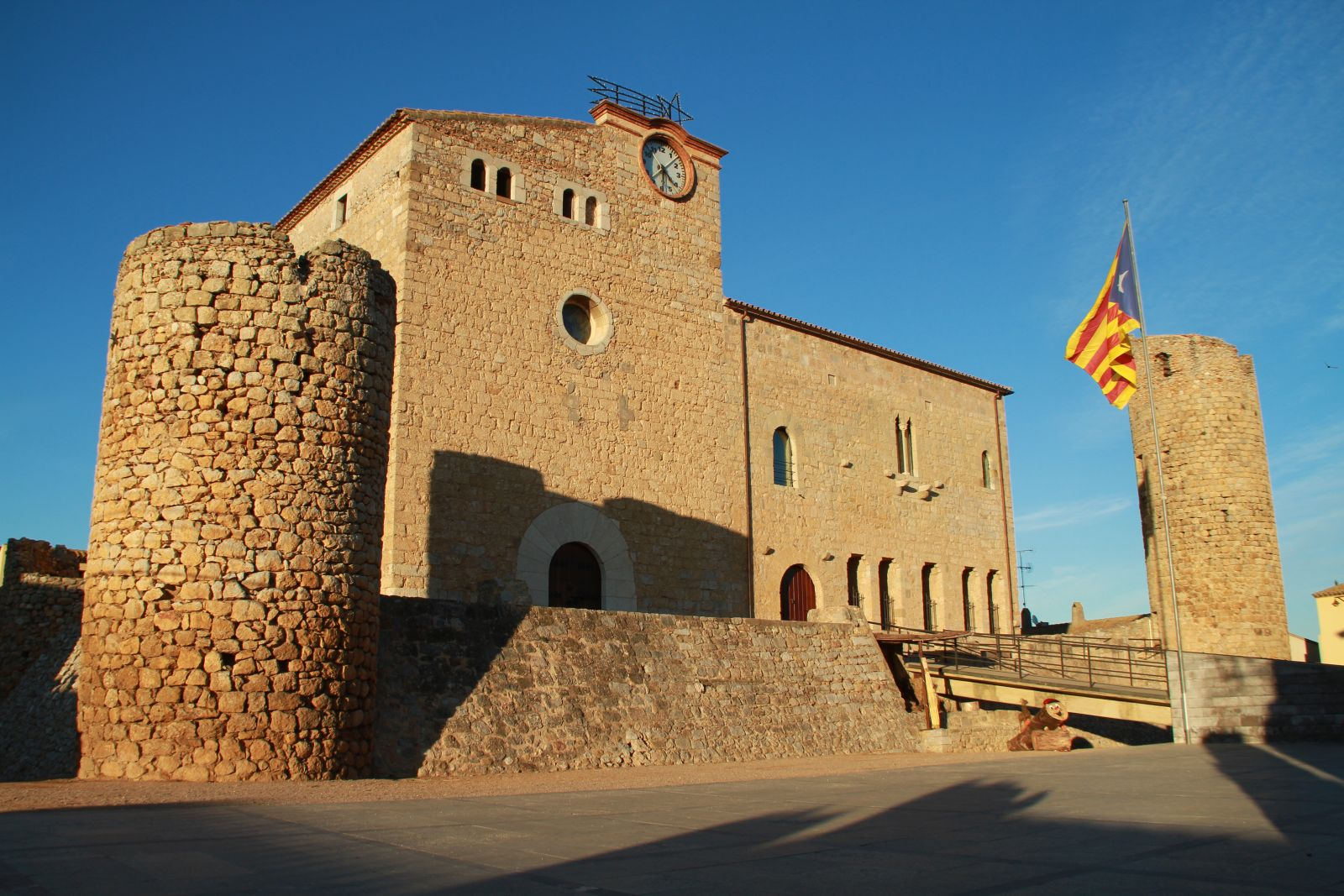
- Bellcaire castle

- Seal

- Location in Catalonia Bellcaire d'Empordà (Spain)
- Coordinates: 42°4′51″N 3°5′46″E
- Country: Spain
- Community: Catalonia
- Province: Girona
- Comarca: Baix Empordà

Government
  - Mayor: David Font Saballs (2015)

Area
  - Total: 12.6 km^{2} (4.9 sq mi)

Population (2025-01-01)
  - Total: 723
  - Density: 57.4/km^{2} (149/sq mi)
- Website: www.bellcaire.net

Bellcaire d'Empordà (Catalan pronunciation: [ˌbeʎˈkajɾə ðəmpuɾˈða]) is a municipality in the comarca of Baix Empordà, in Catalonia, Spain. The municipality covers an area of 12.68 square kilometres (4.90 sq mi) and the population in 2014 was 650.
