= Baix Empordà =

Coordinates: 41°56′42″N 3°03′36″E

- Comarca
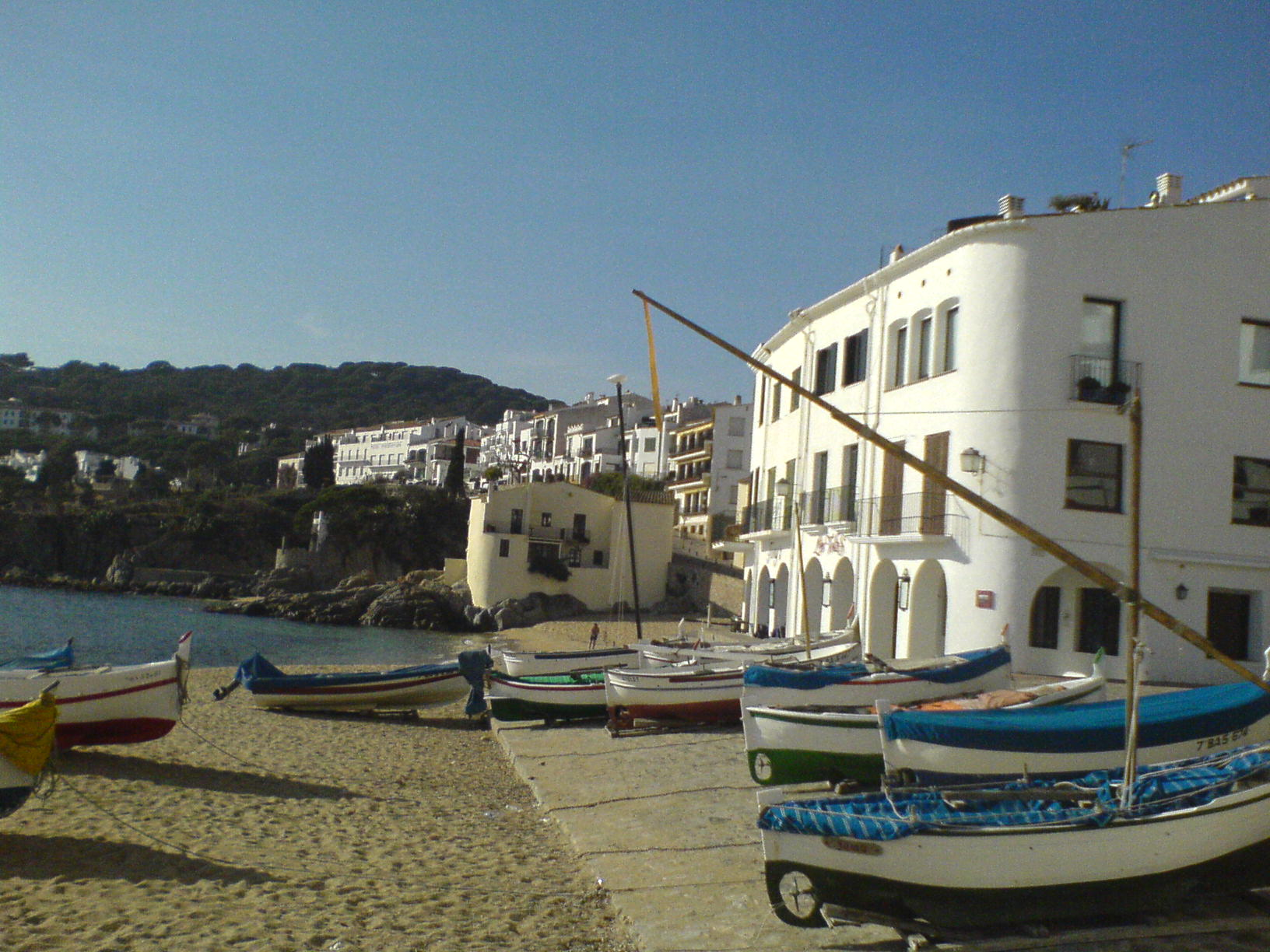
- Platja del Port Bo, Calella de Palafrugell

- Map of Catalonia, with Baix Empordà shown in solid blue. Comarca boundaries are shown in grey.
- Country: Spain
- Autonomous community: Catalonia
- Region: Comarques Gironines
- Province: Girona
- Capital: La Bisbal d'Empordà
- Municipalities: List: Albons, Begur, Bellcaire d'Empordà, La Bisbal d'Empordà, Calonge, Castell-Platja d'Aro, Colomers, Corçà, Cruïlles, Monells i Sant Sadurní de l'Heura, Foixà, Fontanilles, Forallac, Garrigoles, Gualta, Jafre, Mont-ras, Palafrugell, Palamós, Palau-sator, Pals, Parlavà, La Pera, Regencós, Rupià, Sant Feliu de Guíxols, Santa Cristina d'Aro, Serra de Daró, Tallada d'Empordà, Torrent, Torroella de Montgrí, Ullastret, Ullà, Ultramort, Vall-llobrega, Verges, Vilopriu

Government
  - Body: Baix Empordà Comarcal Council
  - President: Glòria Marull (Junts) (2023-2025); TBD (ERC) (2025-2027)

Area
  - Total: 701.8 km^{2} (271.0 sq mi)

Population (2014)
  - Total: 132,886
  - Density: 189.4/km^{2} (490.4/sq mi)
- Demonym: Baixempordanès
- Time zone: UTC+1 (CET)
  - Summer (DST): UTC+2 (CEST)
- Largest municipality: Palafrugell

Baix Empordà (Catalan: [ˈbaʒ əmpurˈda]; Spanish: Bajo Ampurdán; "Lower Empordà") is a comarca (county) in the Girona region, Catalonia, in Spain. It is one of the two comarques into which Empordà was divided in the comarcal division of 1936, the other one being Alt Empordà. It is popularly known as L'Empordanet ("the Little Empordà"). The capital is La Bisbal d'Empordà.

== Geography ==
=== Extent ===
Baix Empordà is the southern portion of the historical region of Empordà. It includes the municipalities between the Montgrí Massif, just north of the river Ter, and the Aro valley, in the south. It measure some 43 kilometres (27 mi) from north to south, and 28 kilometres (17 mi) from east to west, with a total area of 700.5 square kilometres (270.5 sq mi). It borders Alt Empordà to the north, Gironès and Selva to the west and the Mediterranean Sea to the east.

The Mediterranean coast of the Baix Empordia is part of the Costa Brava, and is a major tourist destination, including resorts such as Sant Feliu de Guíxols, s'Agaro, Platja d'Aro, Sant Antoni de Calonge, Palamós, La Fosca, Calella de Palafrugell, Llafranc, Tamariu, Fornells de Mar and l'Estartit.

The capital of Baix Empordia is La Bisbal d'Empordà, which is some 15 kilometres (9.3 mi) from the coast, but several of the comarca's coastal municipalities have significantly larger populations, most notably Palafrugell, Sant Feliu de Guíxols and Palamós. There are 37 municipalities within the comarca.

=== Municipalities ===
Municipality	Population (2014)	Area km^{2}
Albons	727	11.1
Begur	3,994	20.7
Bellcaire d'Empordà	650	12.6
La Bisbal d'Empordà	10,761	20.6
Calonge	10,541	33.6
Castell-Platja d'Aro	10,721	21.8
Colomers	195	4.4
Corçà	1,257	16.3
Cruïlles, Monells i Sant Sadurní de l'Heura	1,284	99.8
Foixà	320	18.8
Fontanilles	160	9.3
Forallac	1,729	50.6
Garrigoles	159	9.4
Gualta	362	9.0
Jafre	396	6.6
Mont-ras	1,739	12.3
Palafrugell	22,763	26.9
Palamós	17,805	14.0
Palau-sator	305	12.4
Pals	2,533	25.8
Parlavà	410	6.2
La Pera	467	11.5
Regencós	291	6.3
Rupià	246	5.3
Sant Feliu de Guíxols	21,810	16.2
Santa Cristina d'Aro	5,194	67.6
Serra de Daró	211	7.9
La Tallada d'Empordà	454	16.6
Torrent	170	8.0
Torroella de Montgrí	11,381	65.9
Ullà	1,053	7.3
Ullastret	289	11.1
Ultramort	204	4.4
Vall-llobrega	901	5.4
Verges	1,195	9.7
Vilopriu	209	16.4
• Total: 36	132,886	701.8
