= Province of Girona =

Province of Spain

Province of Girona Provincia de Gerona (Spanish) Província de Girona (Catalan)
- Province
- Flag Coat of arms

- Location of the Province of Girona in Spain
- Coordinates: 42°10′N 2°40′E
- Country: Spain
- Autonomous community: Catalonia
- Capital: Girona
- Municipalities: 221

Government
  - President: Miquel Noguer i Planas (Junts)

Area
  - Total: 5,908.09 km^{2} (2,281.13 sq mi)
  - Rank: 40th in Spain

Population (2025)
  - Total: 830,429
  - Rank: 19th in Spain
  - Density: 140.558/km^{2} (364.043/sq mi)
- Demonym(s): Gironí, gironina (ca), gerundense (es)
- Time zone: UTC+1 (CET)
  - Summer (DST): UTC+2 (CEST)
- ISO 3166 code: ES-GI
- Official language(s): Catalan and Spanish
- Parliament: Cortes Generales
- Website: www.ddgi.cat

The Province of Girona (Spanish: provincia de Gerona [pɾoˈβinθja ðe xeˈɾona]; Catalan: província de Girona [pɾuˈvinsiə ðə ʒiˈɾonə]) is a province in the northeastern part of the autonomous community of Catalonia in Spain. It is bordered on the northwest by the province of Lleida, on the southwest by the province of Barcelona, on the north by France (Pyrénées-Orientales), and on the east by the Mediterranean Sea.

As of 2025, it has a population of 830,429 in an area of 5,908.09 square kilometres (2,281.13 sq mi) across its 221 municipalities. Its capital and largest city is Girona, with an urban area (including the neighbouring municipalities of Salt, Sarrià de Ter and Vilablareix) representing, with a total population of 144,709, 19.2% of the population. The Girona area acts as an industrial, commercial and service hub for a significant part of the province.

== Administration ==
=== Composition of the Provincial Deputation ===
Provincial Deputation of Girona Diputació de Girona (Catalan) Diputación de Girona (Spanish)
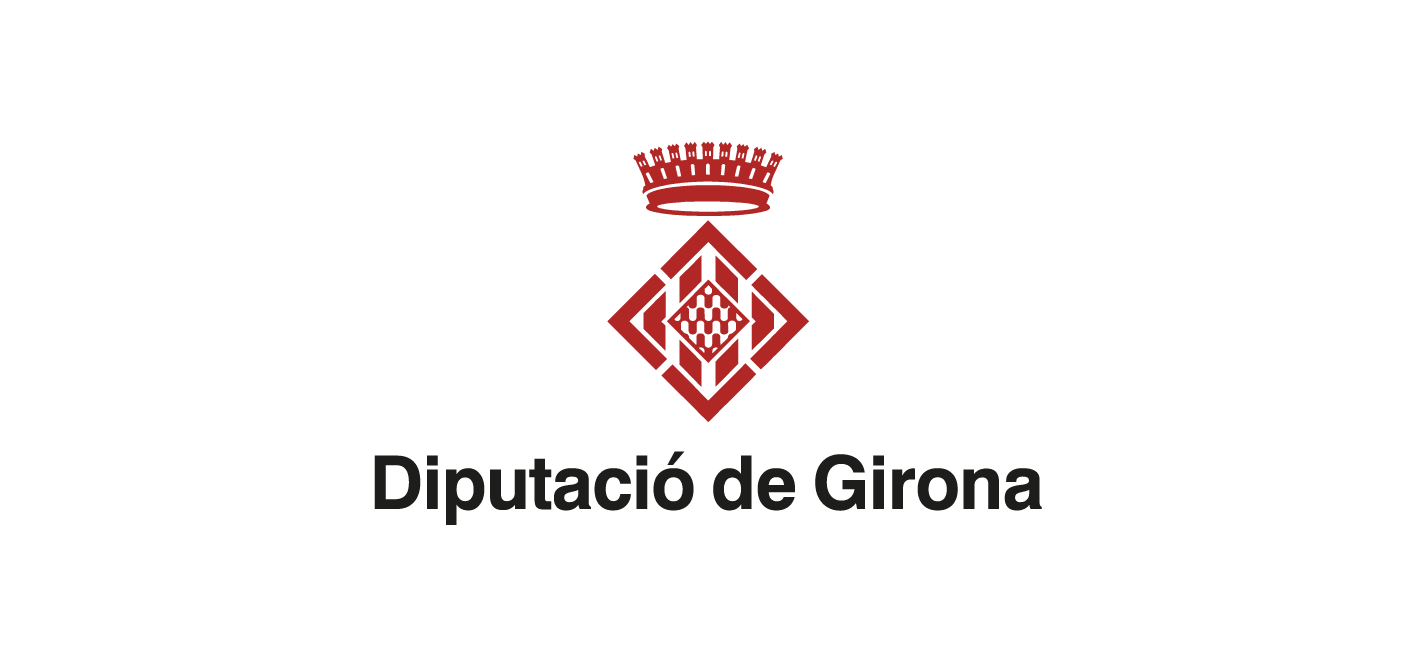
- Logo

Type
- Type: Provincial Deputation

History
- Founded: 1822
- Disbanded: 1931–1939

Structure
- Seats: 27
- Political groups: Government (18): Junts (10); ERC (8); Opposition (9): PSC (5); CUP (2); IdS (1); TxE (1)
- Length of term: 4 years
- Province of Girona

Agency overview
- Employees: 810
- Annual budget: €197 million
- Website: https://www.ddgi.cat/

Key to parties CUP PSUC ICV ERC PSC JxCat Junts CC–UCD CiU
Election	Distribution
1979	4 / 6 / 14
1983	1 / 11 / 13
1987	8 / 17
1991	10 / 17
1995	1 / 10 / 16
1999	2 / 10 / 15
2003	1 / 5 / 9 / 12
2007	6 / 9 / 12
2011	5 / 7 / 15
2015	1 / 8 / 3 / 1 / 14
2019	1 / 9 / 4 / 1 / 1 / 11
2023	2 / 8 / 5 / 1 / 1 / 10

=== Comarques ===
Since the division by provinces in Spain and the division by comarques in Catalonia do not completely match, the term comarques of the province of Girona is not accurate. However, a list of the comarques that are included—totally or partially—in the province of Girona can be made:

- Fully included:
  - l'Alt Empordà
  - el Baix Empordà
  - la Garrotxa
  - el Gironès
  - el Pla de l'Estany
  - el Ripollès
- Partially included:
  - la Selva (all municipalities except Fogars de la Selva)
  - la Cerdanya (only its eastern half)
  - Osona (this comarca is generally not listed as part of Girona, since only three of its municipalities are part of this province: Espinelves, Vidrà and Viladrau)

=== Municipalities ===
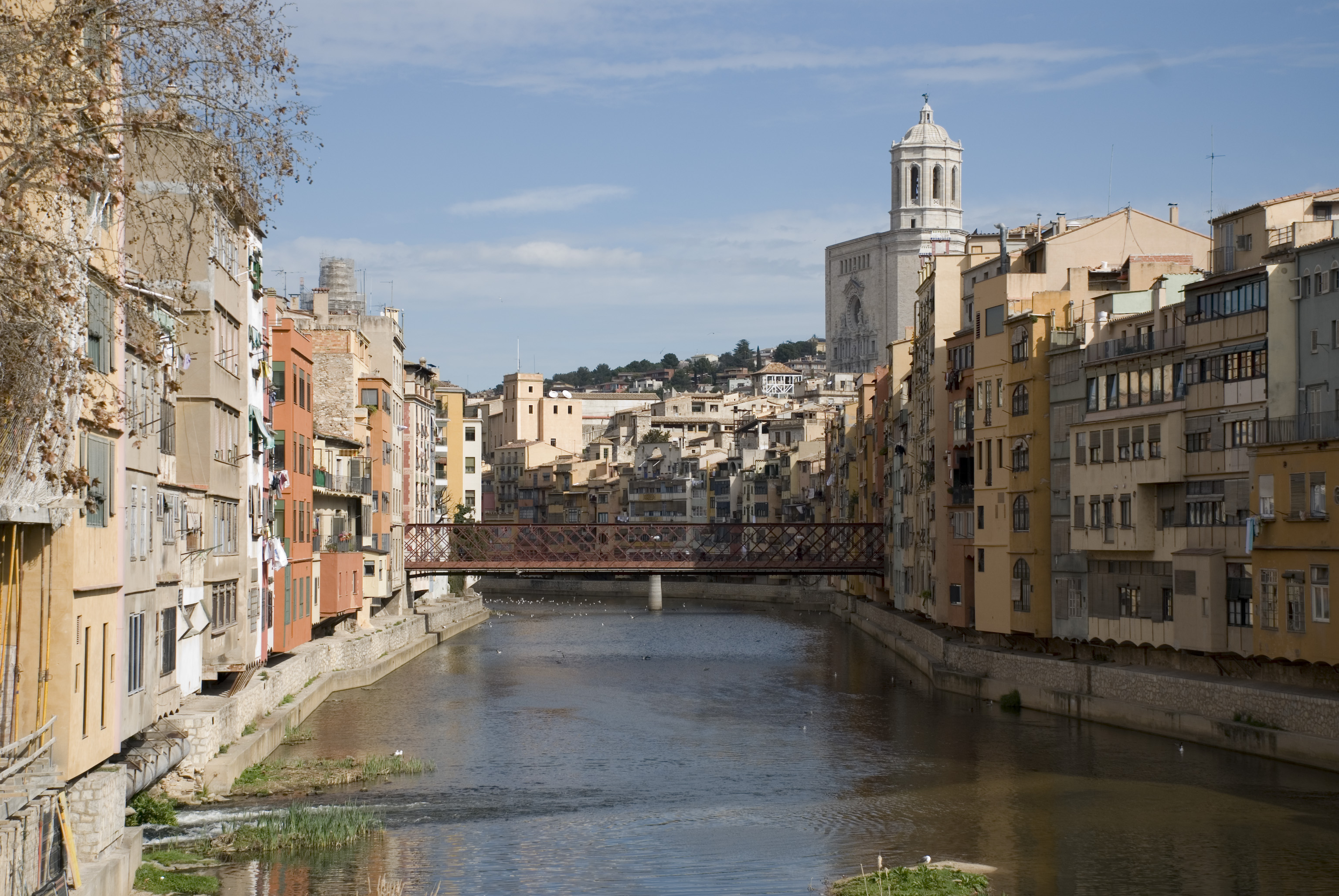
Girona and the river Onyar

The province has 221 municipalities, of which the most populous are Girona (population 108,352), Figueres (49,556), Blanes (42,446), Lloret de Mar (41,944), Olot (39,516), Salt (34,603), Palafrugell (24,556) Sant Feliu de Guíxols (23,060), Banyoles (20,887) and Roses (20,175).

- Agullana
- Aiguaviva
- Albanyà
- Albons
- Alp
- Amer
- Anglès
- Arbúcies
- Argelaguer
- L'Armentera
- Avinyonet de Puigventós
- Banyoles
- Bàscara
- Begur
- Bellcaire d'Empordà
- Besalú
- Bescanó
- Beuda
- La Bisbal d'Empordà
- Biure
- Blanes
- Boadella i les Escaules
- Bolvir
- Bordils
- Borrassà
- Breda
- Brunyola
- Cabanelles
- Cabanes
- Cadaqués
- Caldes de Malavella
- Calonge
- Camós
- Campdevànol
- Campelles
- Campllong
- Camprodon
- Canet d'Adri
- Cantallops
- Capmany
- Cassà de la Selva
- Castell-Platja d'Aro
- Castellfollit de la Roca
- Castelló d'Empúries
- La Cellera de Ter
- Celrà
- Cervià de Ter
- Cistella
- Colera
- Colomers
- Corçà
- Cornellà del Terri
- Crespià
- Cruïlles, Monells i Sant Sadurní de l'Heura
- Darnius
- Das
- L'Escala
- Espinelves
- Espolla
- Esponellà
- El Far d'Empordà
- Figueres
- Flaçà
- Foixà
- Fontanals de Cerdanya
- Fontanilles
- Fontcoberta
- Forallac
- Fornells de la Selva
- Fortià
- Garrigàs
- Garrigoles
- Garriguella
- Ger
- Girona
- Gombrèn
- Gualta
- Guils de Cerdanya
- Hostalric
- Isòvol
- Jafre
- La Jonquera
- Juià
- Lladó
- Llagostera
- Llambilles
- Llanars
- Llançà
- Llers
- Llívia
- Lloret de Mar
- Les Llosses
- Maçanet de Cabrenys
- Maçanet de la Selva
- Madremanya
- Maià de Montcal
- Masarac
- Massanes
- Meranges
- Mieres
- Mollet de Peralada
- Molló
- Mont-ras
- Montagut i Oix
- Navata
- Ogassa
- Olot
- Ordis
- Osor
- Palafrugell
- Palamós
- Palau de Santa Eulàlia
- Palau-sator
- Palau-saverdera
- Palol de Revardit
- Pals
- Pardines
- Parlavà
- Pau
- Pedret i Marzà
- La Pera
- Peralada
- Les Planes d'Hostoles
- Planoles
- Pont de Molins
- Pontós
- Porqueres
- El Port de la Selva
- Portbou
- Les Preses
- Puigcerdà
- Quart
- Queralbs
- Rabós
- Regencós
- Ribes de Freser
- Riells i Viabrea
- Ripoll
- Riudarenes
- Riudaura
- Riudellots de la Selva
- Riumors
- Roses
- Rupià
- Sales de Llierca
- Salt
- Sant Andreu Salou
- Sant Aniol de Finestres
- Sant Climent Sescebes
- Sant Feliu de Buixalleu
- Sant Feliu de Guíxols
- Sant Feliu de Pallerols
- Sant Ferriol
- Sant Gregori
- Sant Hilari Sacalm
- Sant Jaume de Llierca
- Sant Joan de les Abadesses
- Sant Joan de Mollet
- Sant Joan les Fonts
- Sant Jordi Desvalls
- Sant Julià de Ramis
- Sant Julià del Llor i Bonmatí
- Sant Llorenç de la Muga
- Sant Martí de Llémena
- Sant Martí Vell
- Sant Miquel de Campmajor
- Sant Miquel de Fluvià
- Sant Mori
- Sant Pau de Segúries
- Sant Pere Pescador
- Santa Coloma de Farners
- Santa Cristina d'Aro
- Santa Llogaia d'Àlguema
- Santa Pau
- Sarrià de Ter
- Saus, Camallera i Llampaies
- La Selva de Mar
- Serinyà
- Serra de Daró
- Setcases
- Sils
- Siurana
- Susqueda
- La Tallada d'Empordà
- Terrades
- Torrent
- Torroella de Fluvià
- Torroella de Montgrí
- Tortellà
- Toses
- Tossa de Mar
- Ullà
- Ullastret
- Ultramort
- Urús
- La Vajol
- La Vall d'en Bas
- La Vall de Bianya
- Vall-llobrega
- Vallfogona de Ripollès
- Ventalló
- Verges
- Vidrà
- Vidreres
- Vila-sacra
- Vilabertran
- Vilablareix
- Viladamat
- Viladasens
- Vilademuls
- Viladrau
- Vilafant
- Vilajuïga
- Vilallonga de Ter
- Vilamacolum
- Vilamalla
- Vilamaniscle
- Vilanant
- Vilaür
- Vilobí d'Onyar
- Vilopriu

The municipality of Llívia, which is an exclave separated from the rest of Spain and surrounded by France, is also officially part of this province.

== Demographics ==
As of 2025, the population is 830,429, of which 50.1% are males, and 49.9% are females. Minors make up 17.7% of the population, and seniors make up 19.2%.

Historical population

Year	Pop.	±%
1842	191,995	—
1857	310,970	+62.0%
1877	305,658	−1.7%
1887	311,153	+1.8%
1900	303,829	−2.4%
1910	324,378	+6.8%
1920	330,774	+2.0%
1930	331,389	+0.2%
1940	324,766	−2.0%

Year	Pop.	±%
1950	322,371	−0.7%
1960	351,645	+9.1%
1970	412,357	+17.3%
1981	467,000	+13.3%
1991	509,628	+9.1%
2001	565,304	+10.9%
2011	751,806	+33.0%
2021	784,941	+4.4%

Source: INE

=== Immigration ===
As of 2025, immigrants make up 27.3% of the population. The 5 largest foreign countries of birth are Morocco, Honduras, Colombia, Romania, and Argentina.

== Transport ==
The province is served by Girona–Costa Brava Airport which provides direct routes to some destinations in Europe and Morocco. However, Josep Tarradellas Barcelona–El Prat Airport is also frequently used by air travellers from the province which provides more domestic and international destinations. The airport is located 115 km (71 mi) south west of Girona.
