= Rupià =

- Municipality
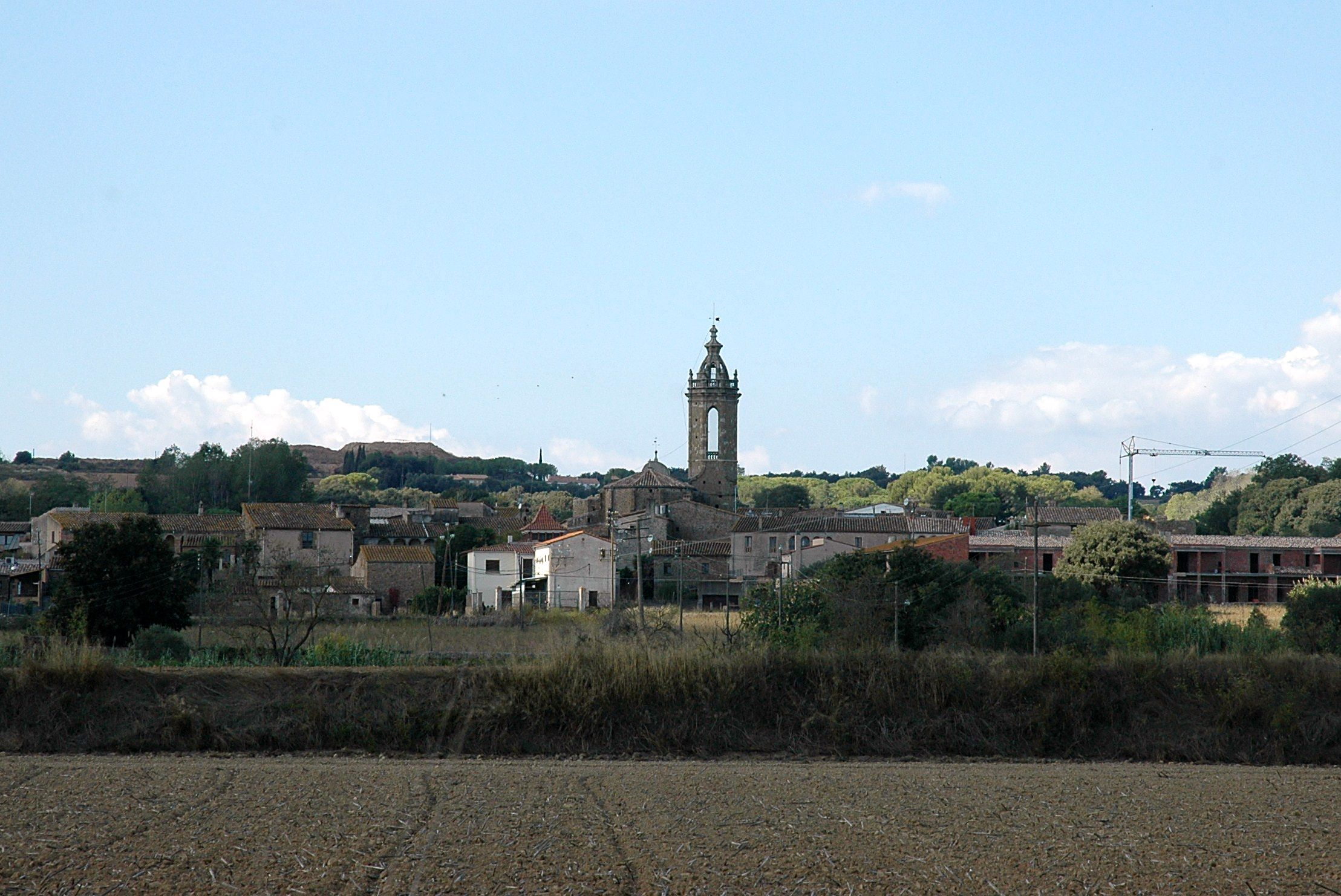
- Rupià

- Coat of arms

- Location in Catalonia Rupià (Spain)
- Coordinates: 42°1′N 3°1′E
- Country: Spain
- Community: Catalonia
- Province: Girona
- Comarca: Baix Empordà

Government
  - Mayor: Xavier Olagoitia Urizar (2015)

Area
  - Total: 5.3 km^{2} (2.0 sq mi)

Population (2025-01-01)
  - Total: 325
  - Density: 61/km^{2} (160/sq mi)
- Website: www.rupia.cat

Rupià (Catalan pronunciation: [rupiˈa]) is a village in the province of Girona and autonomous community of Catalonia, Spain. The municipality covers an area of 5.3 square kilometres (2.0 sq mi) and the population in 2014 was 246.
