= Palau-sator =

- Municipality
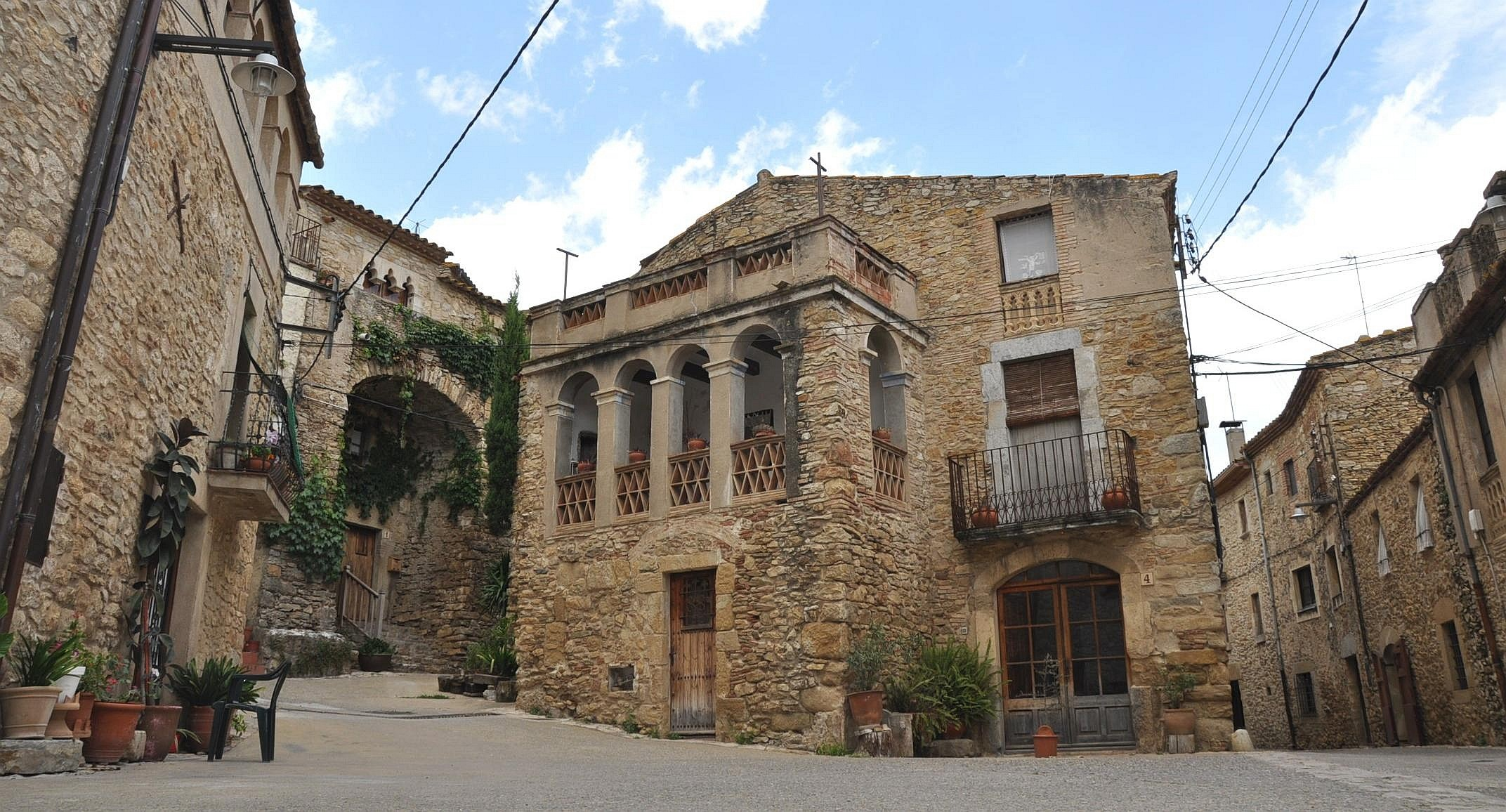
- Palau-sator, centre

- Flag Coat of arms

- Location in Catalonia Palau-sator (Spain)
- Coordinates: 41.989°N 3.110°E
- Country: Spain
- Community: Catalonia
- Province: Girona
- Comarca: Baix Empordà

Government
  - Mayor: Joan Sabrià Giralt (2015)

Area
  - Total: 12.4 km^{2} (4.8 sq mi)

Population (2025-01-01)
  - Total: 311
  - Density: 25.1/km^{2} (65.0/sq mi)
- Website: www.palau-sator.cat

Palau-sator (Catalan pronunciation: [pəˌlawsəˈtoɾ]) is a village in the province of Girona within the autonomous community of Catalonia, Spain. The municipality covers an area of 12.37 square kilometres (4.78 sq mi), and included a population of 295 in 2018.

Palau-sator lies on an inland stage of the GR 92 long distance footpath, between Torroella de Montgrí and Begur.

The Rural Museum of Palau-sator was inaugurated in 1996, and features a collection of traditional farming equipment, carriages, carts, and tools that were once used by local farmers. There are also displays of chores and other items that may be found in rural farmhouses.

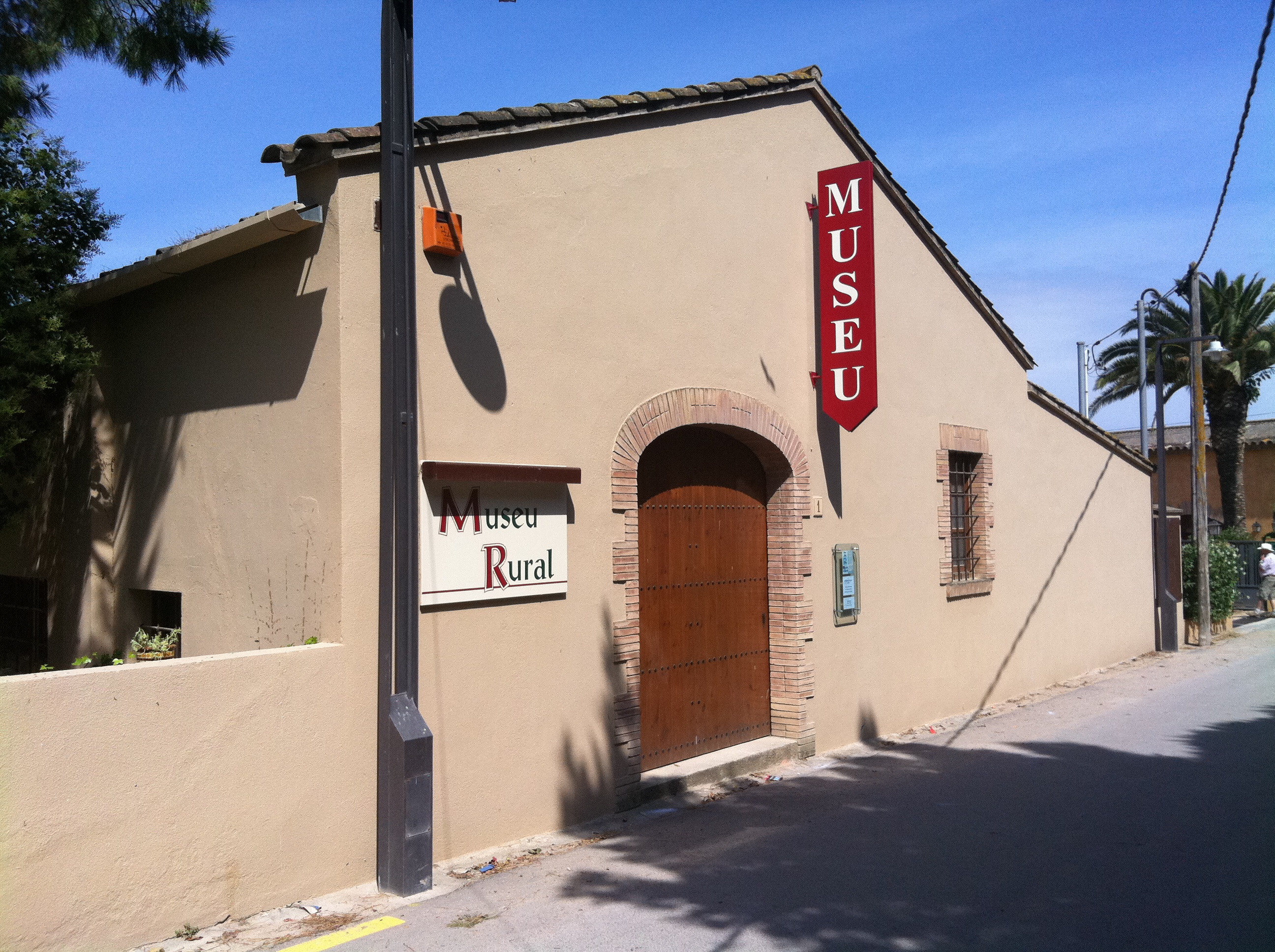
The Rural Museum in Palau-sator
