= List of rivers of Spain =

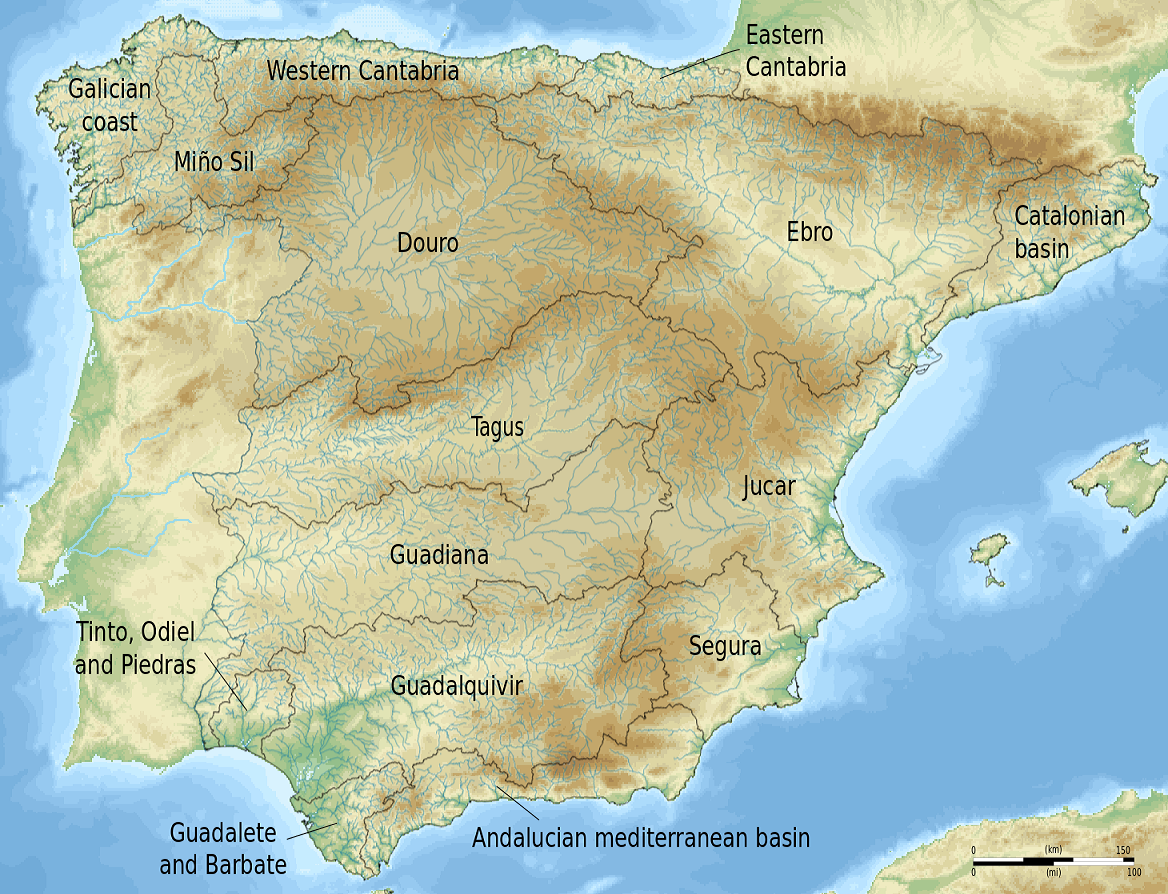
River Basins in continental Spain.

This is an incomplete list of rivers that are at least partially in Spain. The rivers flowing into the sea are sorted along the coast. Rivers flowing into other rivers are listed by the rivers they flow into. Rivers in the mainland Iberian Peninsula can be divided into those belonging to the Mediterranean watershed, those flowing into the Atlantic Ocean and those emptying into the Cantabrian sea (a marginal sea of the Atlantic off the northern coast of the Iberian peninsula).

Tributaries are listed down the page in a downstream direction. The main stem river of a catchment is labelled as ms, left-bank tributaries are indicated by l, right-bank tributaries by r. Where a named river derives from the confluence of two differently named rivers these are labelled as ls and rs for the left and right forks (the rivers on the left and right, relative to an observer facing downstream). The transboundary rivers partially running through Portugal or France and/or along the borders of Spain with those countries are labelled as int.

The list begins with the northernmost item of the Mediterranean watershed (close to the French border) and moves clockwise around the Iberian Peninsula.

Outside from the Iberian peninsula mainland, streams in the Canary Islands, the Balearic Islands, Ceuta and Melilla are seasonal watercourses. The Santa Eulàlia river in Ibiza was traditionally considered as the single proper 'river' in the Balearic Islands, but it lost its constant flow by the late 20th-century.

== Mediterranean watershed ==
=== Catalan basins ===
This includes the basins emptying in the Mediterranean Sea located in the coastline north from the Ebro. This leaves out the Garonne and the Ebro, both draining parts of Inner Catalonia, as well as small streams in Catalonia emptying in the Mediterranean south from the Ebro.

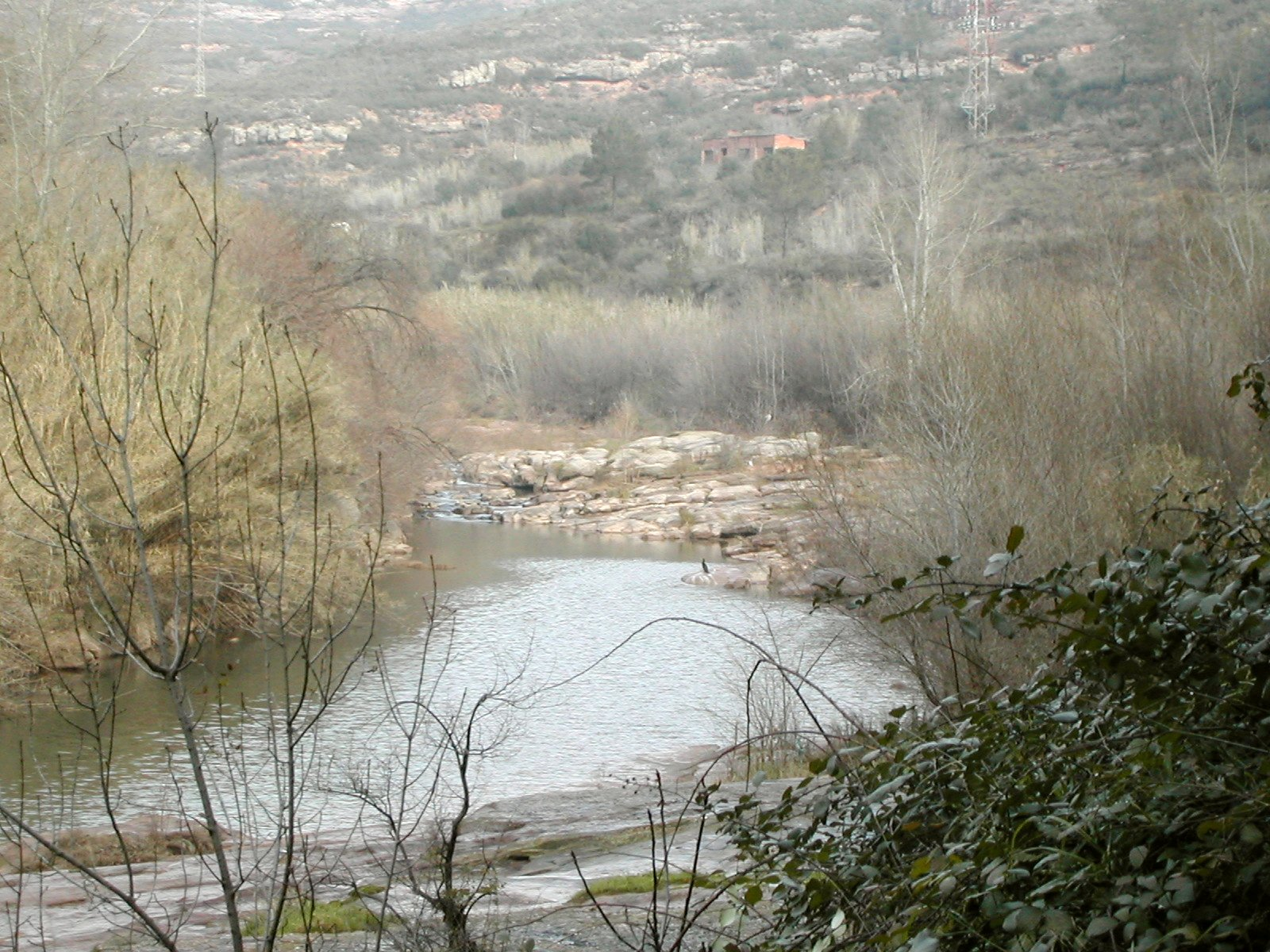
The Llobregat

- Muga (ms · 65 km; 40 mi)
  - Manol (r · 42 km; 26 mi)
- Fluvià (ms · 98 km; 61 mi)
  - Gurn (l)
  - Llierca (l · 30 km; 19 mi)
  - Borró (l)
  - Ser (r)
- Ter (ms · 209 km; 130 mi)
  - Ritort (l)
  - Freser (r · 31 km; 19 mi)
    - Núria
    - Rigard
  - Gurri (r)
    - Mèder (l)
  - Riera Major (r)
  - Brugent
  - Güell (r)
  - Onyar/Oñar (r · 34 km; 21 mi)
  - Terri (l)
  - Daró (r)
- Tordera (ms · 50 km; 31 mi)
  - Riera d'Arbúcies (l 31 km; 19 mi)
- Besòs (ms · 50 km; 31 mi)
  - Congost (rs · 41 km; 25 mi)
  - Mogent (ls)
  - Tenes (r · 28 km; 17 mi)
  - Ripoll (r · 40 km; 25 mi)
- Llobregat (ms · 157 km; 98 mi)
  - Saldes (r)
  - Merlès (l · 47 km; 29 mi)
  - Gavarresa (l · 60 km; 37 mi)
  - Cardener (r · 87 km; 54 mi)
  - Anoia (r · 58 km; 36 mi)
- Foix (ms · 49 km; 30 mi)
- Gaià/Gayá (ms)
- Francolí (ms · 58 km; 36 mi)

=== Ebro ===
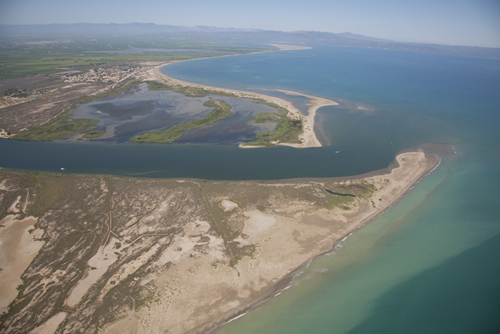
The mouth of the Ebro in the Ebro Delta.

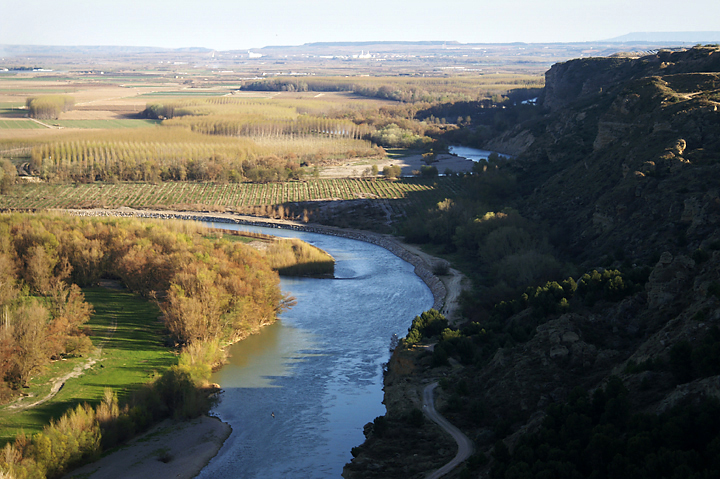
The River Aragón

- Ebro (ms · 910 km; 570 mi)
  - Híjar (r · 28 km; 17 mi; aside from joining the Ebro near Reinosa, the upstream traditional source of the very same Ebro in Fontibre has been recently redescribed as a water spring of the Híjar)
  - Rudrón (r · 35 km; 22 mi)
  - Oca (r · 72 km; 45 mi)
  - Nela (l · 74 km; 46 mi)
  - Bayas (l · 58 km; 36 mi)
  - Zadorra (l · 88 km; 55 mi)
  - Tirón (r · 64 km; 40 mi)
  - Najerilla/Neila (r · 73 km; 45 mi)
  - Ega (l · 115 km; 71 mi)
  - Cidacos (r · 79 km; 49 mi)
  - Aragón (l · 197 km; 122 mi)
    - Aragón Subordán r · 51 km; 32 mi)
    - Irati (l · 80 km; 50 mi)
    - Arga (r · 149 km; 93 mi)
  - Alhama (r · 79 km; 49 mi)
  - Queiles (r · 42 km; 26 mi)
  - Arba (l · 80 km; 50 mi)
  - Jalón (r · 224 km; 139 mi)
    - Piedra (r · 66 km; 41 mi)
    - Manubles (l · 64 km; 40 mi)
    - Jiloca (r · 123 km; 76 mi)
  - Huerva (r · 135 km; 84 mi)
  - Gállego (l · 203 km; 126 mi)
    - Guarga (l · 40 km; 25 mi)
    - Sotón (l · 52 km; 32 mi)
  - Aguasvivas (r · 103 km; 64 mi)
  - Martín (r · 98 km; 61 mi)
    - Escuriza (r · 35 km; 22 mi)
  - Guadalope (r · 182 km; 113 mi)
    - Bergantes (r · 57 km; 35 mi)
  - Segre (l · int · 261 km; 162 mi)
    - Valira/Gran Valira (r · int)
    - Ribera Salada (l)
    - Rialb (r · 30 km; 19 mi)
    - Llobregós (l)
    - Noguera Pallaresa (r · 143 km; 89 mi)
    - Sió (l)
    - Corb (l)
    - Noguera Ribagorçana/Noguera Ribagorzana (r · 130 km; 81 mi)
      - Noguera de Tor (l)
    - Set (l)
    - Cinca (r · 177 km; 110 mi)
      - Ara (r · 66 km; 41 mi)
        - Arazas (l)
      - Lanata (l)
      - Ésera (l · 98 km; 61 mi)
      - Vero (r · 60 km; 37 mi)
      - Alcanadre (r · 138 km; 86 mi)
  - Matarranya/Matarraña (r · 101 km; 63 mi)

=== Levante ===
This roughly includes the basins emptying in the Mediterranean Sea ranging from those emptying south from the Ebro to the intermittent seasonal watercourses characteristic of the areas near the border between Murcia and the Andalusian province of Almería.

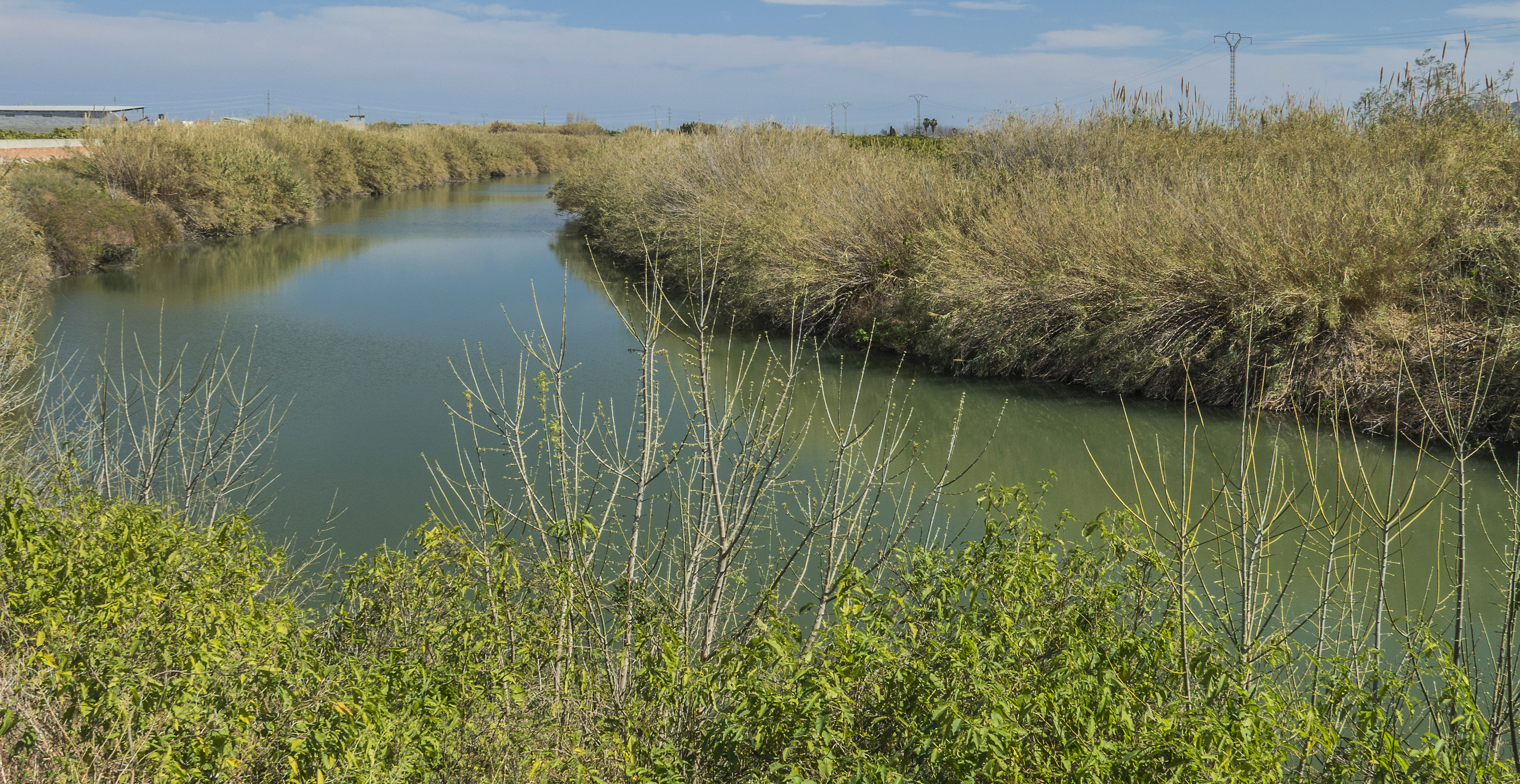
The Júcar passing through Fortaleny.

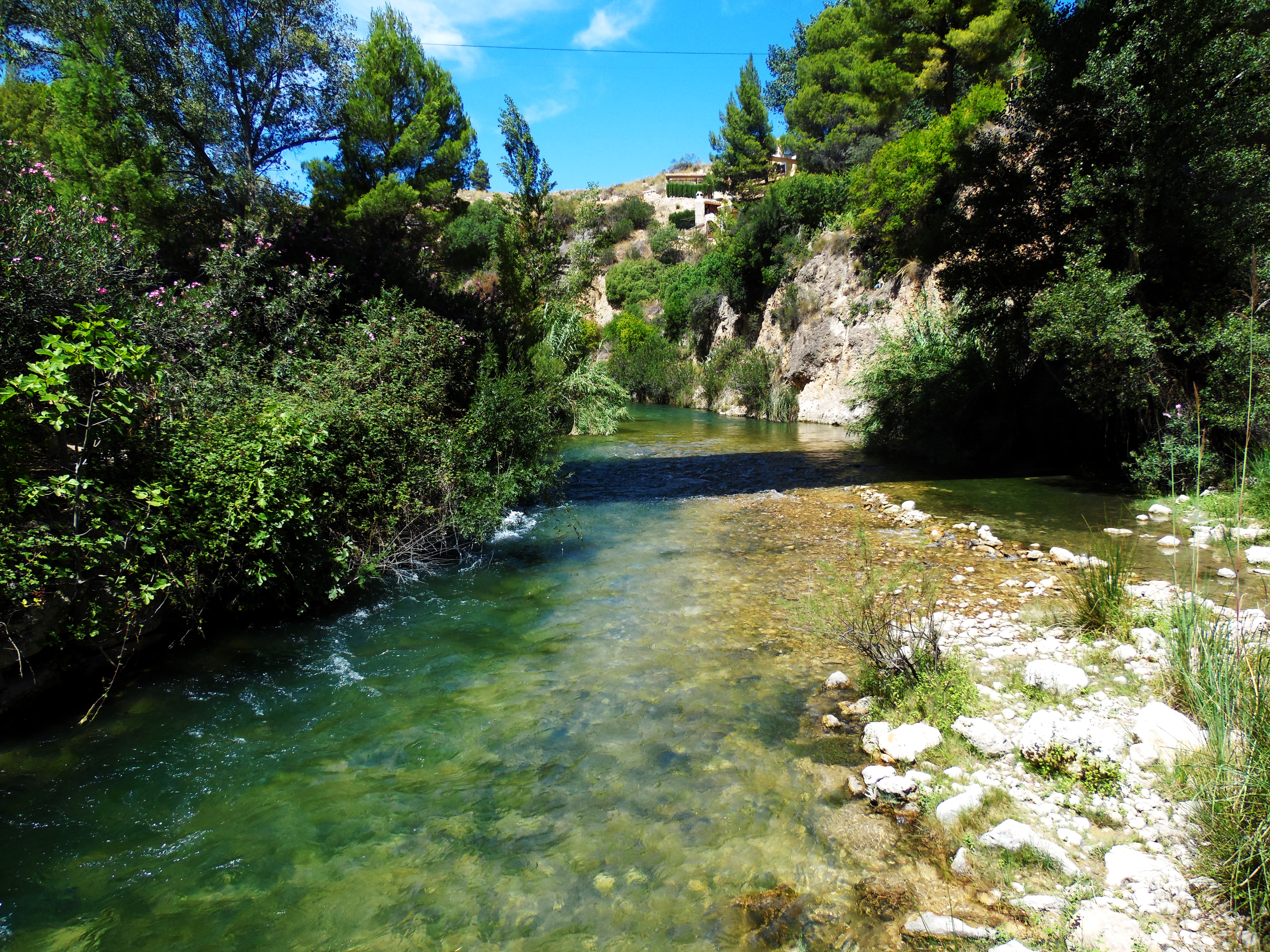
The Segura close to Alcaraz.

- Cenia/Sénia (ms)
- Mijares/Millars (ms · 156 km; 97 mi)
  - Albentosa (r · 32 km; 20 mi)
  - Montán (r)
  - Villahermosa (l)
  - Rambla de la Viuda (l · 81 km; 50 mi)
    - Monleón/Montlleó (rs · 83 km; 52 mi)
    - Rambla Carbonera (ls)
    - Lucena (r · 33 km; 21 mi)
- Belcaire (ms)
- Turia/Guadalaviar (280 km; 170 mi)
  - Alfambra (l · 99 km; 62 mi)
  - Camarena (l)
  - Ebrón (r)
  - Bohílgues/Vallanca (r)
  - Tuéjar (l)
- Júcar/Xúquer (ms · 498 km; 309 mi)
  - Huécar (l · 31 km; 19 mi)
  - Valdemembra (l · 103 km; 64 mi)
  - Cabriel (l · 263 km; 163 mi)
  - Albaida (r · 38 km; 24 mi)
  - Magro/Magre (l · 125 km; 78 mi)
    - Cànyoles/Cáñoles (l · 63 km; 39 mi)
- Serpis (ms · 75 km; 47 mi)
- Vinalopó (ms · 82 km; 51 mi)
- Segura (ms · 325 km; 202 mi)
  - Mundo (l · 108 km; 67 mi)
  - Alhárabe/Moratalla (r)
  - Mula (r · 61 km; 38 mi)
  - Guadalentín/Sangonera (r · 95 km; 59 mi)

=== Andalusian Mediterranean basins ===
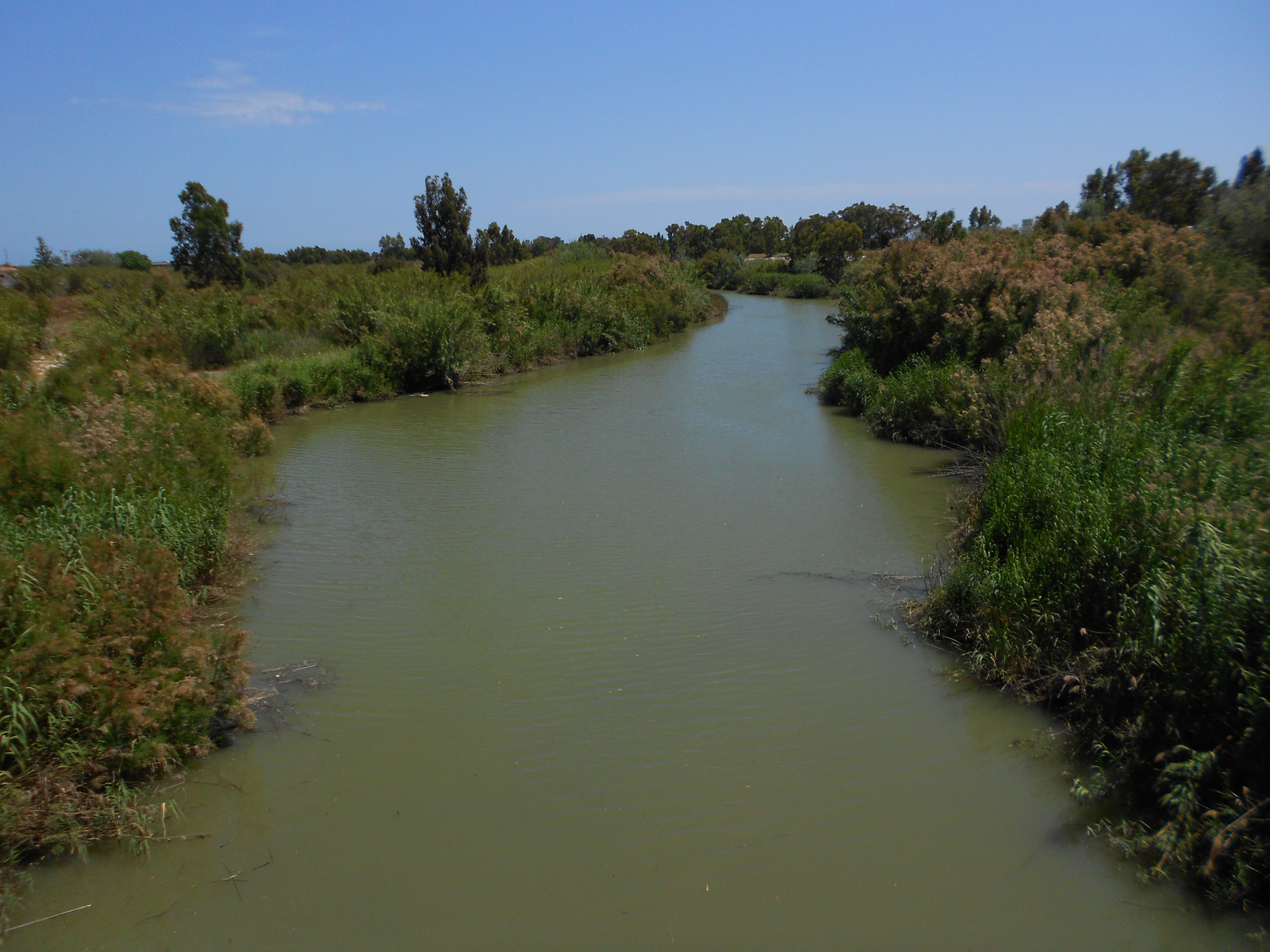
The Guadalhorce

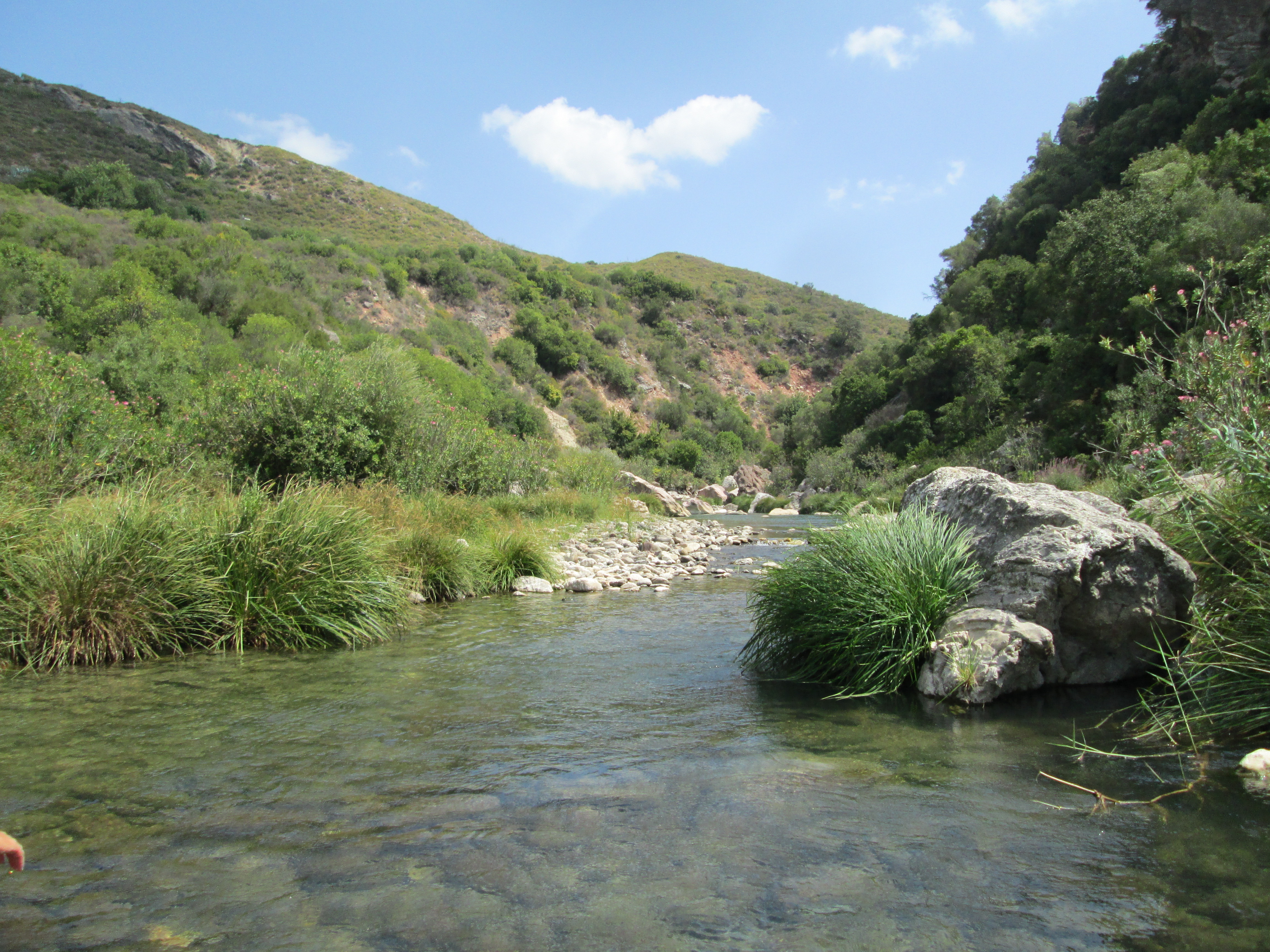
The Guadiaro

- Almanzora (ms · 105 km; 65 mi)
- Andarax (ms · 62 km; 39 mi)
- Adra (ms · 47 km; 29 mi)
- Guadalfeo (ms · 72 km; 45 mi)
  - Trevélez (r · 33 km; 21 mi)
    - Poqueira (r)
- Vélez (ms · 36 km; 22 mi)
- Guadalmedina (ms · 48 km; 30 mi)
- Guadalhorce (ms · 154 km; 96 mi)
  - Guadalteba (r · 43 km; 27 mi)
- Guadiaro (ms · 79 km; 49 mi)
  - Guadalevín
  - Genal (l · 48 km; 30 mi)
  - Hozgarganta (r · 48 km; 30 mi)

== Atlantic watershed ==
This section features the rivers flowing into the Atlantic Ocean, ranging from the Punta de Tarifa (the meeting point of the Mediterranean and the Atlantic) to the Punta de Estaca de Bares (the conventional boundary between the Atlantic of the Cantabrian Sea, one of the former's marginal seas).

=== Gulf of Cádiz ===
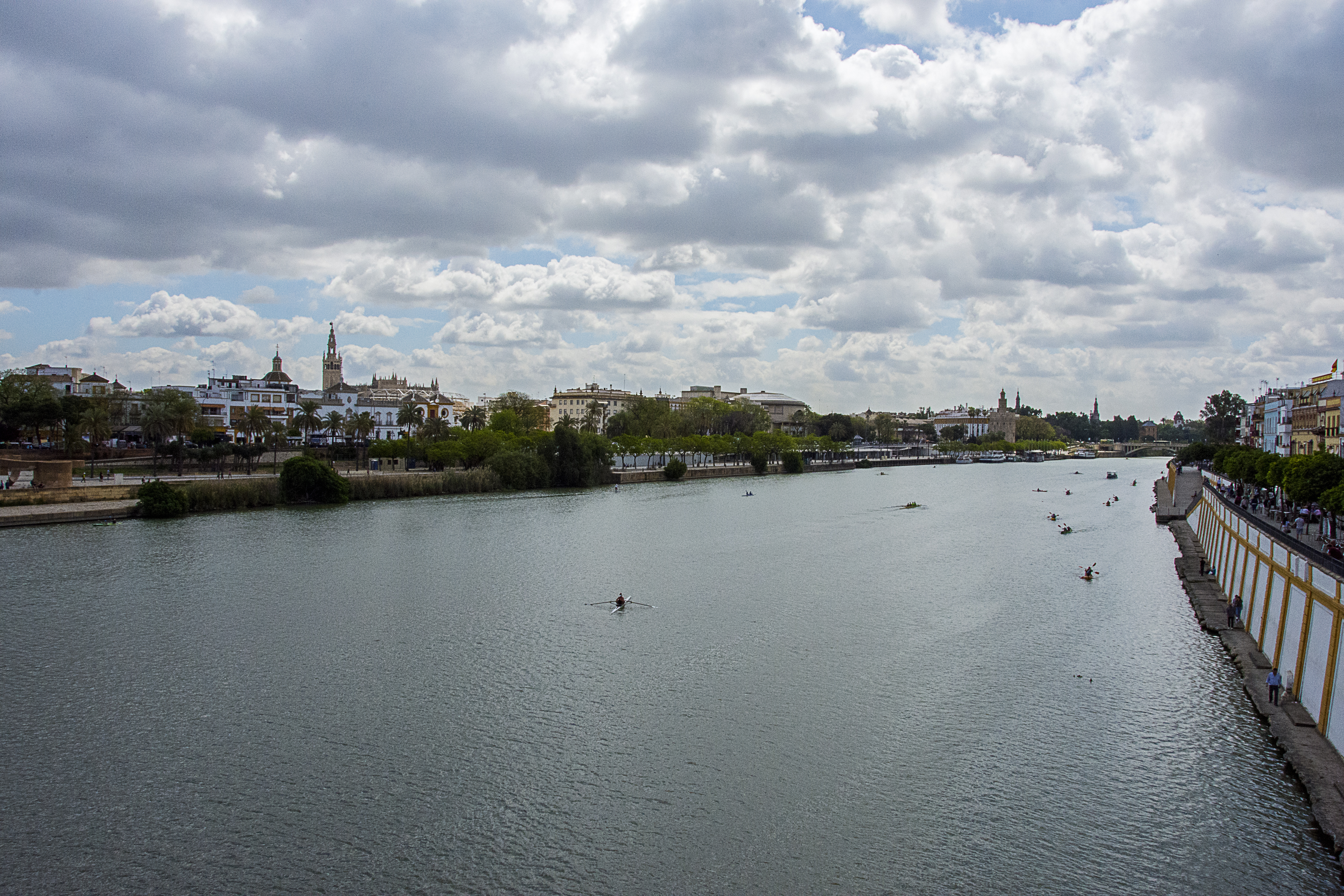
The Guadalquivir passing through Seville

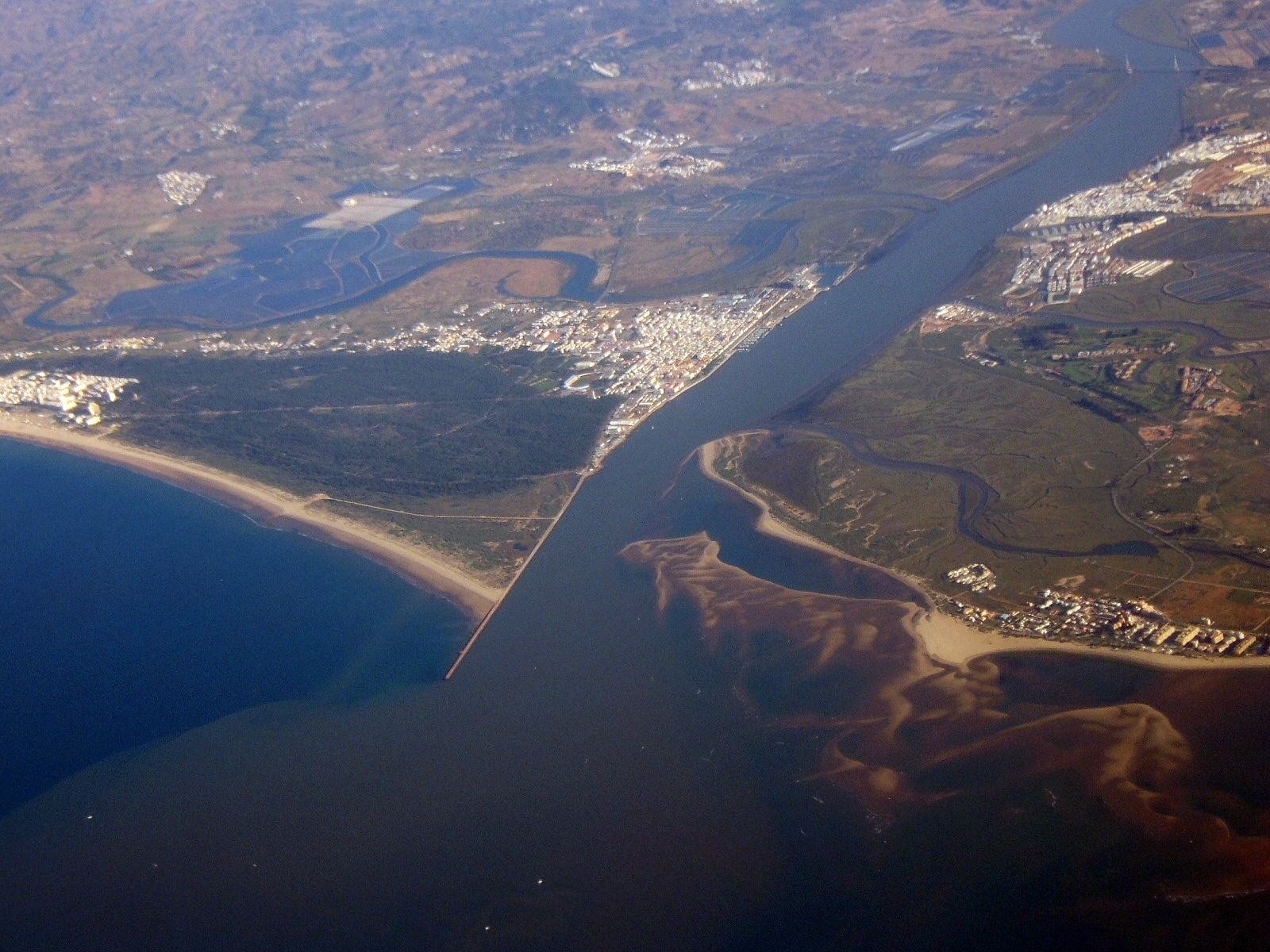
The mouth of the Guadiana

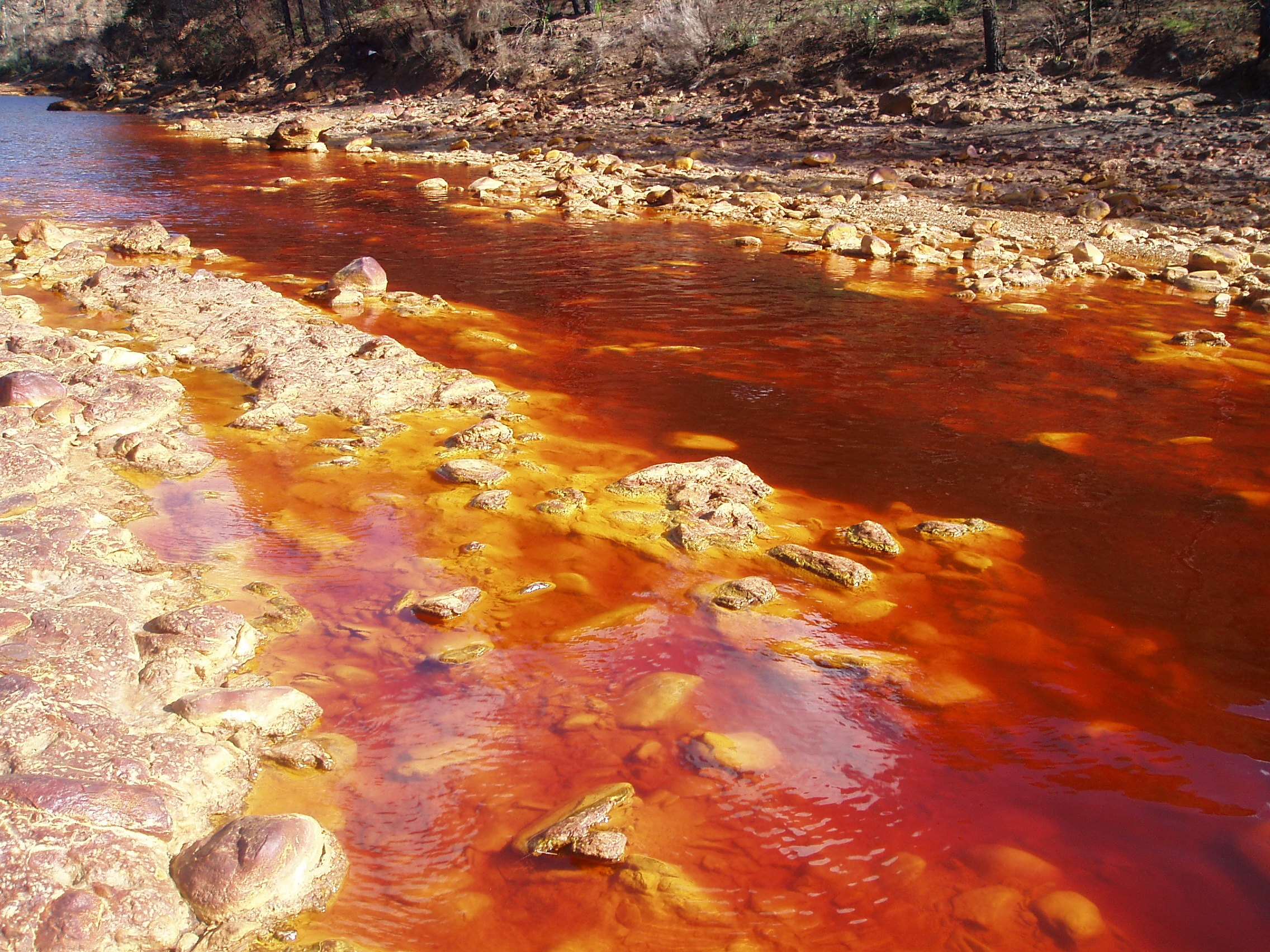
The very acidic waters of the Tinto

- Guadalete (ms · 173 km; 107 mi)
  - Majaceite
- San Pedro
- Guadalquivir (ms · 657 km; 408 mi)
  - Guadiana Menor (l · 182 km; 113 mi)
  - Guadalimar (r · 167 km; 104 mi)
    - Guadalén (r · 127 km; 79 mi)
  - Guadalbullón (l · 74 km; 46 mi)
  - Rumblar (r · 70 km; 43 mi)
  - Jándula (r · 90 km; 56 mi)
  - Yeguas (r · 76 km; 47 mi)
  - Guadalmellato (r · 111 km; 69 mi)
  - Guadajoz (l · 114 km; 71 mi)
  - Guadiato (r · 123 km; 76 mi)
  - Bembézar (r · 111 km; 69 mi)
  - Genil (l · 337 km; 209 mi)
    - Darro (r)
  - Corbones (l · 58 km; 36 mi)
  - Viar (r · 117 km; 73 mi)
  - Rivera de Huelva (r · 61 km; 38 mi)
  - Guadaíra (l · 89 km; 55 mi)
  - Guadiamar (r · 60 km; 37 mi)
- Tinto (ms · 93 km; 58 mi) (Note: It empties in the Ría de Huelva, the same estuary as the Odiel · the Tinto and the Odiel are often considered part of the same river system.))
- Odiel (ms · 121 km; 75 mi) (Note: It empties in the Ría de Huelva, the same estuary as the Tinto · the Tinto and the Odiel are often considered part of the same river system.))
- Piedras (ms)
- Guadiana (ms · int · 818 km; 508 mi)
  - Cigüela (r)
    - Záncara (l)
      - Rus (l)
      - Saona (r)
      - Córcoles (l)
        - Ojuelo (l)
  - Jabalón (l)
  - Bullaque (r)
  - Tirteafuera (l)
  - Estena (r)
  - Guadalupe (r)
  - Zújar (l)
  - Matachel (l)
  - Gévora/Xévora (r · int)
  - Ardila (l · int)
    - Múrtigas (l · int)
  - Chanza (l · int)

=== Tagus ===
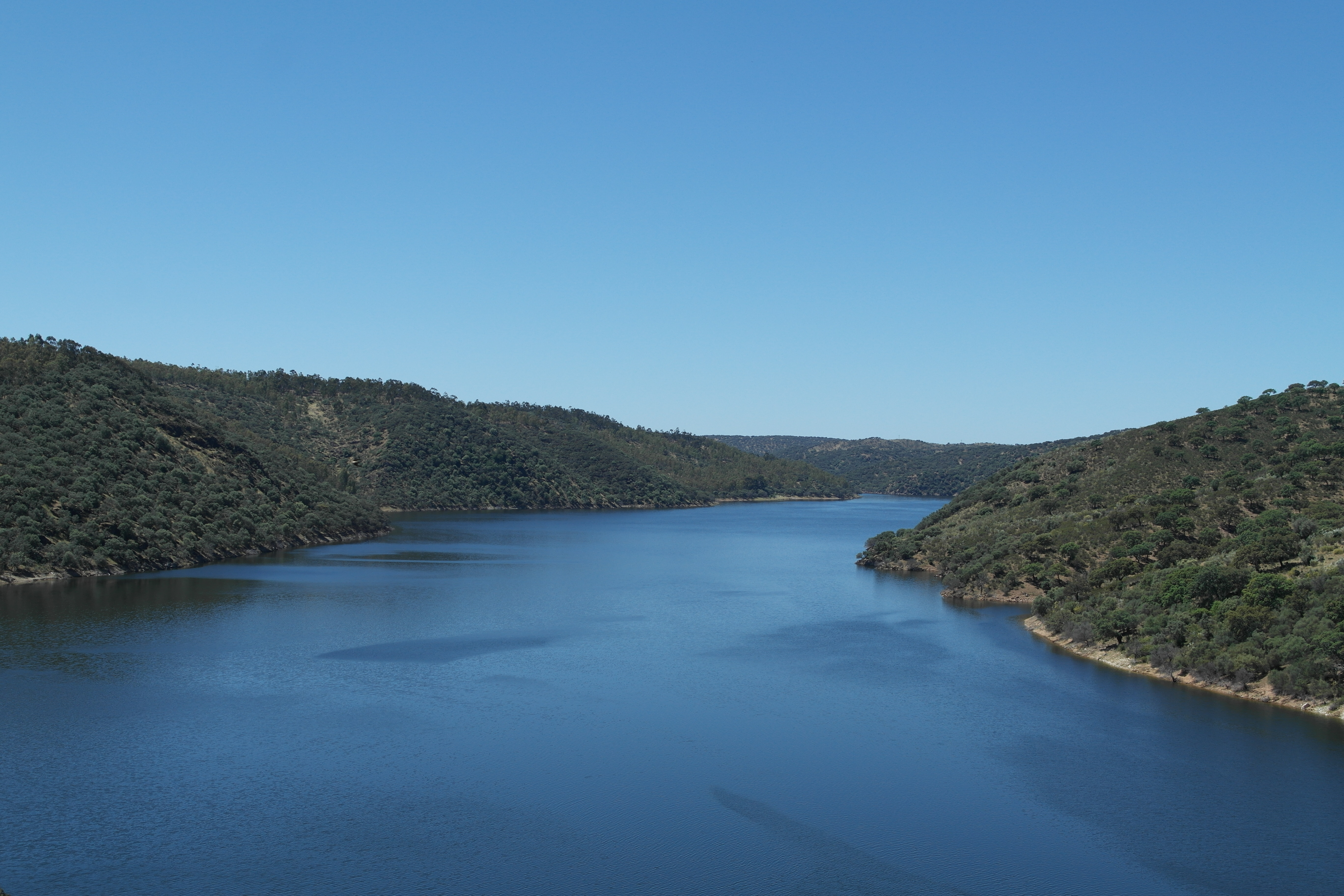
The Tagus passing through Monfragüe.

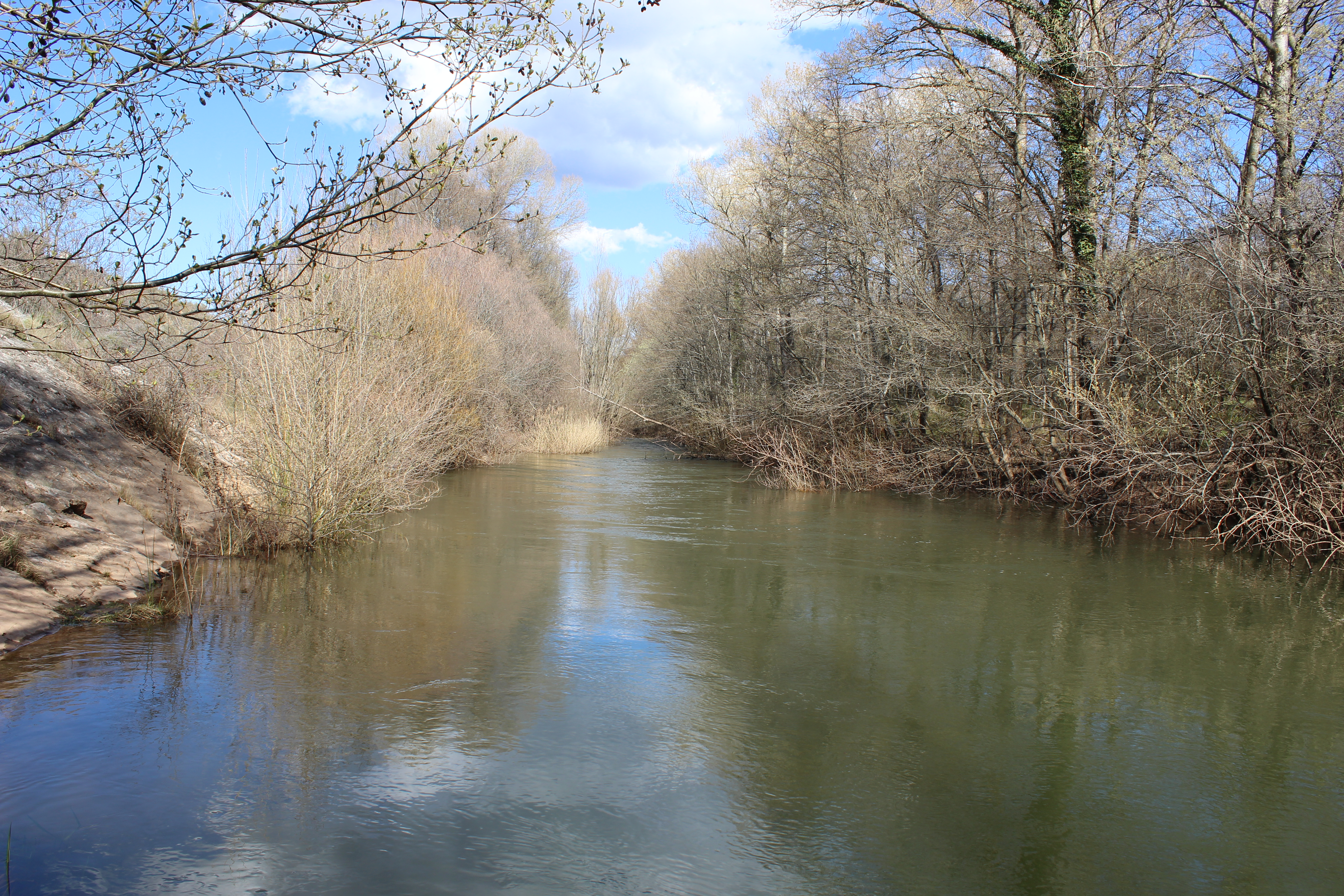
The Jarama near Uceda.

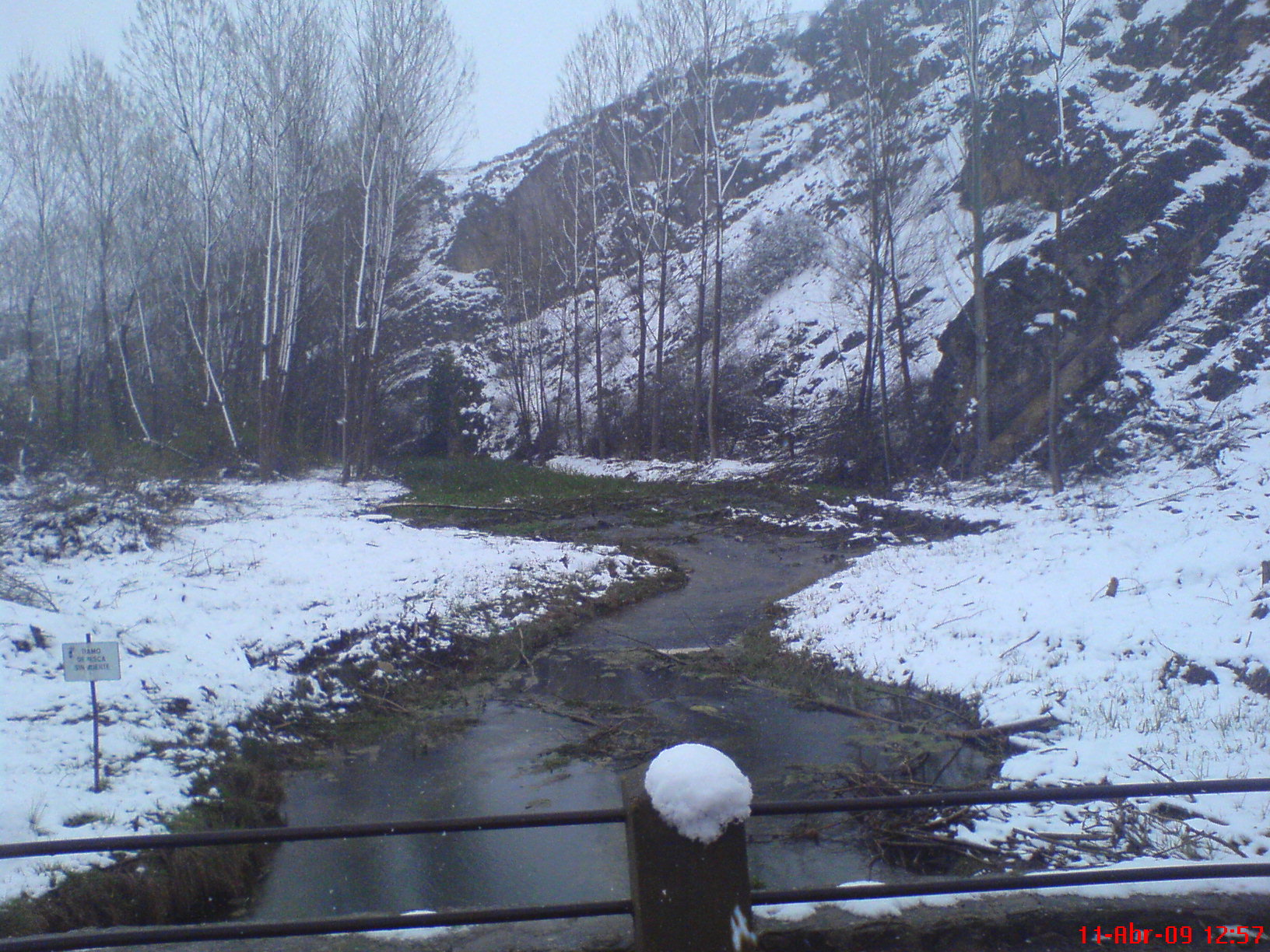
The Gallo near Chera.

- Tagus/Tajo/Tejo (ms · int · 1,007 km; 626 mi; of which 816 km (507 mi) run through Spain and 47 km (29 mi) through the Portugal–Spain border)
  - Gallo (l · 98 km; 61 mi)
  - Guadiela (l · 117 km; 73 mi)
    - Cuervo (l · 36 km; 22 mi)
    - Escabas (l · 62 km; 39 mi)
      - Trabaque (l · 40 km; 25 mi)
    - Mayor (l · 71 km; 44 mi)
  - Jarama (r · 194 km; 121 mi)
    - Lozoya (r · 91 km; 57 mi)
    - Guadalix (r · 42 km; 26 mi)
    - Henares (r · 160 km; 99 mi)
      - Salado (r · 39 km; 24 mi)
      - Dulce (l · 38 km; 24 mi)
      - Cañamares (r · 43 km; 27 mi)
      - Bornova (r · 53 km; 33 mi)
        - Manadero (l · 7 km; 4.3 mi)
      - Sorbe (r · 80 km; 50 mi)
      - Badiel (l)
      - Torote (r · 48 km; 30 mi)
    - Manzanares (r · 87 km; 54 mi)
    - Tajuña (l · 226 km; 140 mi)
      - Ungría (r)
  - Algodor (l · 96 km; 60 mi)
  - Guadarrama (r · 96 km; 60 mi)
    - Aulencia (l)
  - Pusa (l · 67 km; 42 mi)
  - Alberche (r · 182 km; 113 mi)
    - Gaznata (l)
    - Cofio (l · 51 km; 32 mi)
    - Perales (l · 29 km; 18 mi)
  - Tiétar (r · 170 km; 110 mi)
    - Garganta Torinas (l)
    - Ramacastañas (r)
    - Arenal (r)
    - Guadyerbas (l · 45 km; 28 mi)
    - Garganta de Santa María (r · 27 km; 17 mi)
    - Garganta de Alardos (r)
    - Garganta de Cuartos (r)
  - Almonte (l · 160 km; 99 mi)
    - Tamuja (l · 84 km; 52 mi)
      - Gibranzos (r · 37 km; 23 mi)
      - Magasca (r · 52 km; 32 mi)
    - Guadiloba (l · 56 km; 35 mi)
  - Alagón (r · 201 km; 125 mi)
    - Ladrillar (r)
    - Hurdano (r · 37 km; 23 mi)
    - Jerte (l · 70 km; 43 mi)
    - Árrago (r · 71 km; 44 mi)
      - Rivera de Gata (r · 40 km; 25 mi)

=== Douro ===
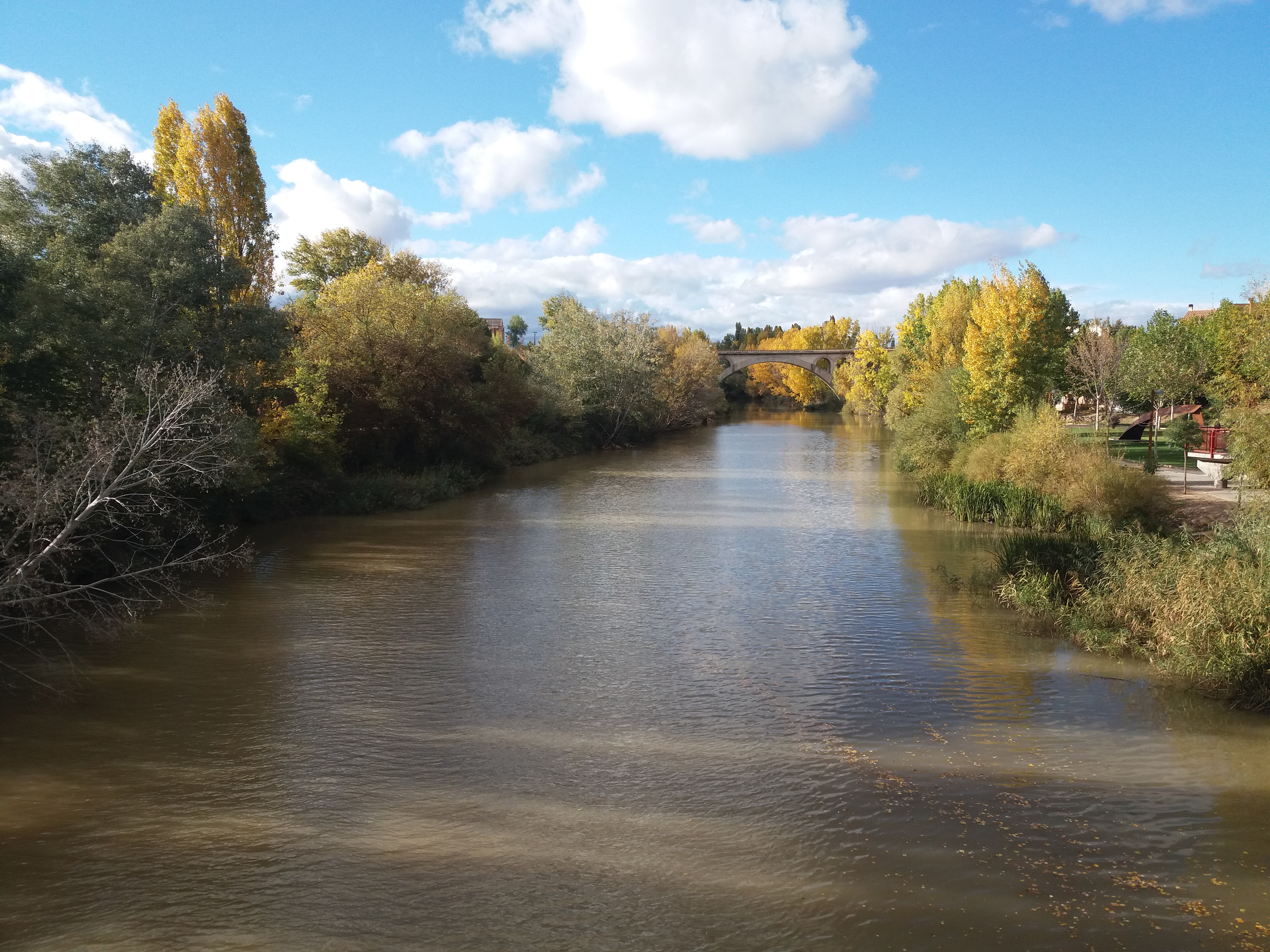
The Douro near Aranda de Duero

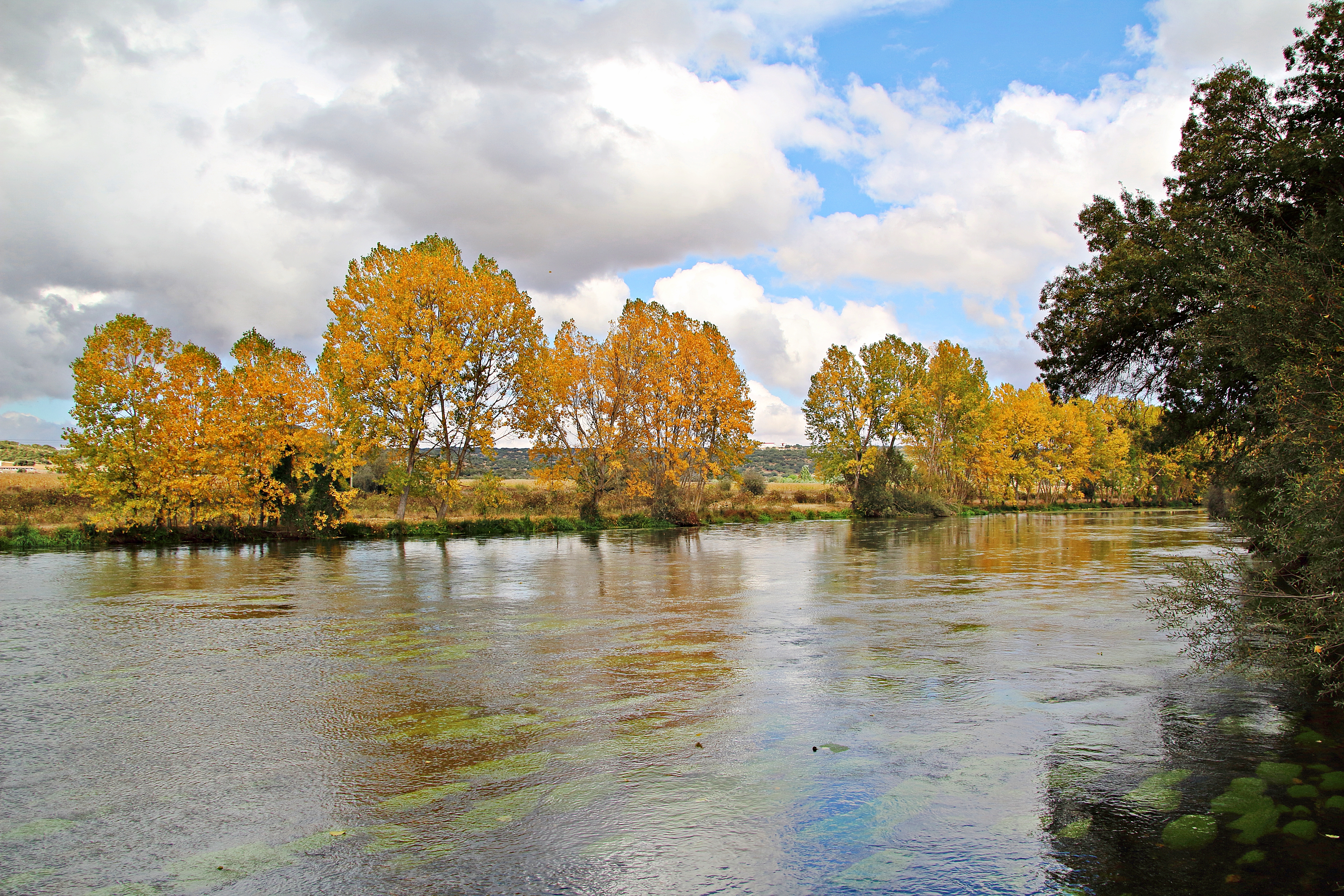
The Tormes near Éjeme.

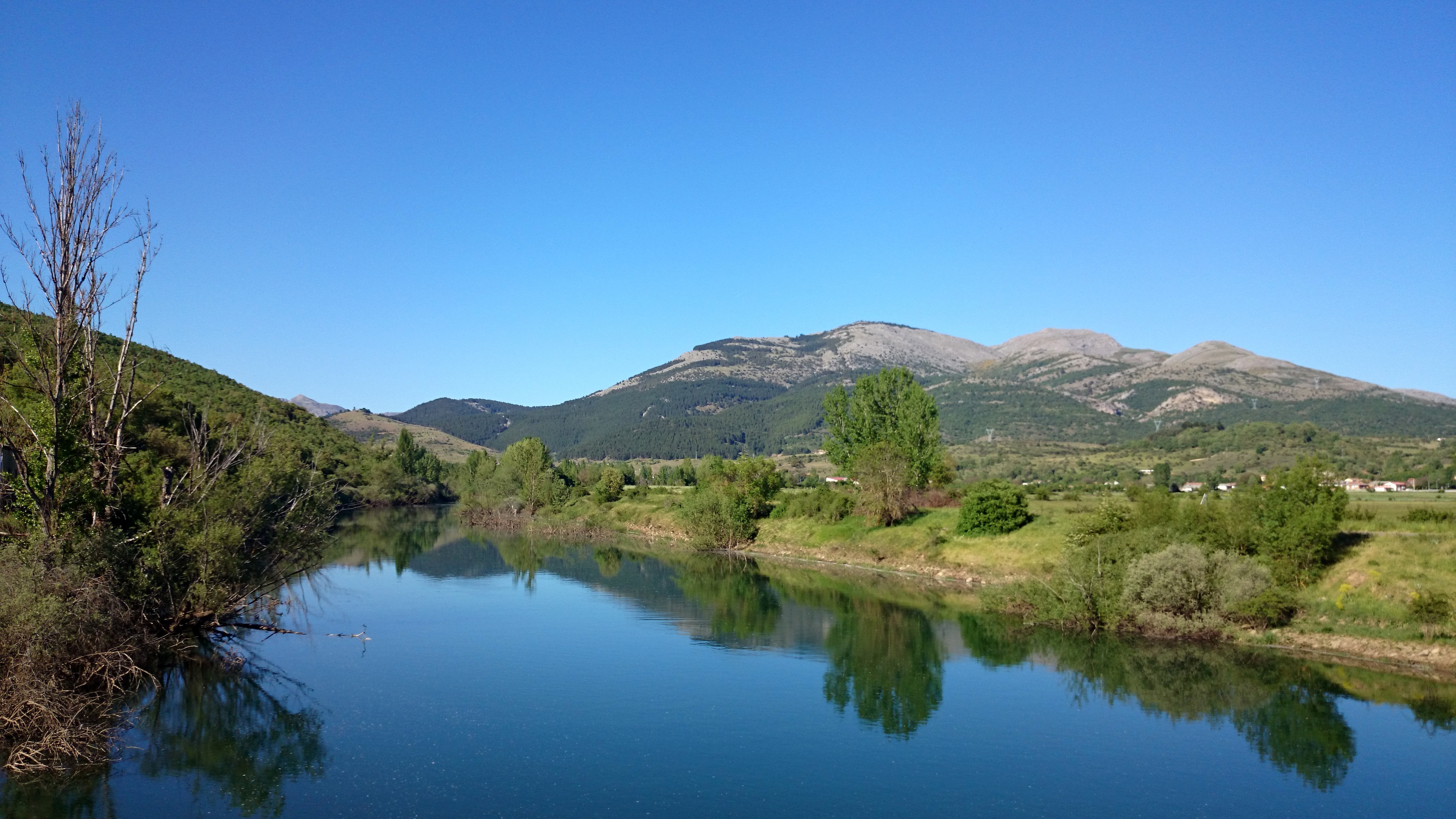
The Esla near Cistierna

- Douro/Duero (ms · int · 897 km; 557 mi of which 572 km (355 mi) run through Spain and 112 km (70 mi) through the Portugal–Spain border)
  - Duratón (l · 103 km; 64 mi)
  - Cega (l · 133 km; 83 mi)
    - Cerquilla River (30 km; 19 mi)
    - Pirón (l · 88 km; 55 mi)
  - Pisuerga (r · 275 km; 171 mi)
    - Valdavia (r · 71 km; 44 mi)
      - Boedo (l · 58 km; 36 mi)
    - Odra (l · 65 km; 40 mi)
      - Brullés (l · 34 km; 21 mi)
      - Arlanza (l · 159 km; 99 mi)
        - Zumel (l)
        - Pedroso (r)
        - Mataviejas (l)
        - Arlanzón (l · 122 km; 76 mi)
          - Ubierna (r · 42 km; 26 mi)
          - Úrbel (r · 50 km; 31 mi)
    - Carrión (r · 178 km; 111 mi)
      - Ucieza (l · 68 km; 42 mi)
    - Esgueva (l · 100 km; 62 mi)
  - Adaja (l · 163 km; 101 mi)
    - Arevalillo (l · 51 km; 32 mi)
    - Eresma (r · 124 km; 77 mi)
      - Voltoya (l)
  - Zapardiel (l · 105 km; 65 mi)
    - Valtodano (l · 175 km; 109 mi)
  - Trabancos (l · 81 km; 50 mi)
    - Regamón (l · 29 km; 18 mi)
  - Guareña (l · 63 km; 39 mi)
  - Valderaduey (r · 146 km; 91 mi)
    - Navajos/Ahogaborricos/Bustillo (l · 51 km; 32 mi)
    - Sequillo (l · 115 km; 71 mi)
    - Salado (r · 35 km; 22 mi)
  - Esla (r · 275 km; 171 mi)
    - Bernesga (r · 76 km; 47 mi)
      - Rodiezmo de la Tercia (r)
      - Torío (l · 60 km; 37 mi)
    - Cea (l · 175 km; 109 mi)
    - Órbigo (r · 97 km; 60 mi)
      - Omaña River (rs · 50 km; 31 mi)
      - Luna (ls)
      - Tuerto (r · 64 km; 40 mi)
      - Eria (r · 95 km; 59 mi)
    - Tera (r · 138 km; 86 mi)
      - Negro (l · 51 km; 32 mi)
      - Castrón (r) · 41 km; 25 mi)
    - Aliste (r · 68 km; 42 mi)
      - Mena (r) · 21 km; 13 mi)
  - Tormes (l · 247 km; 153 mi)
  - Águeda (l · 132 km; 82 mi)
  - Huebra (l · 122 km; 76 mi)
  - Tâmega/Támega (r · int · 145 km; 90 mi of which 52 km or 32 mi run through Spain)

=== Lima ===
- Lima/Limia (ms · int · 126 km; 78 mi of which 41 km or 25 mi run through Spain)

=== Minho-Sil ===
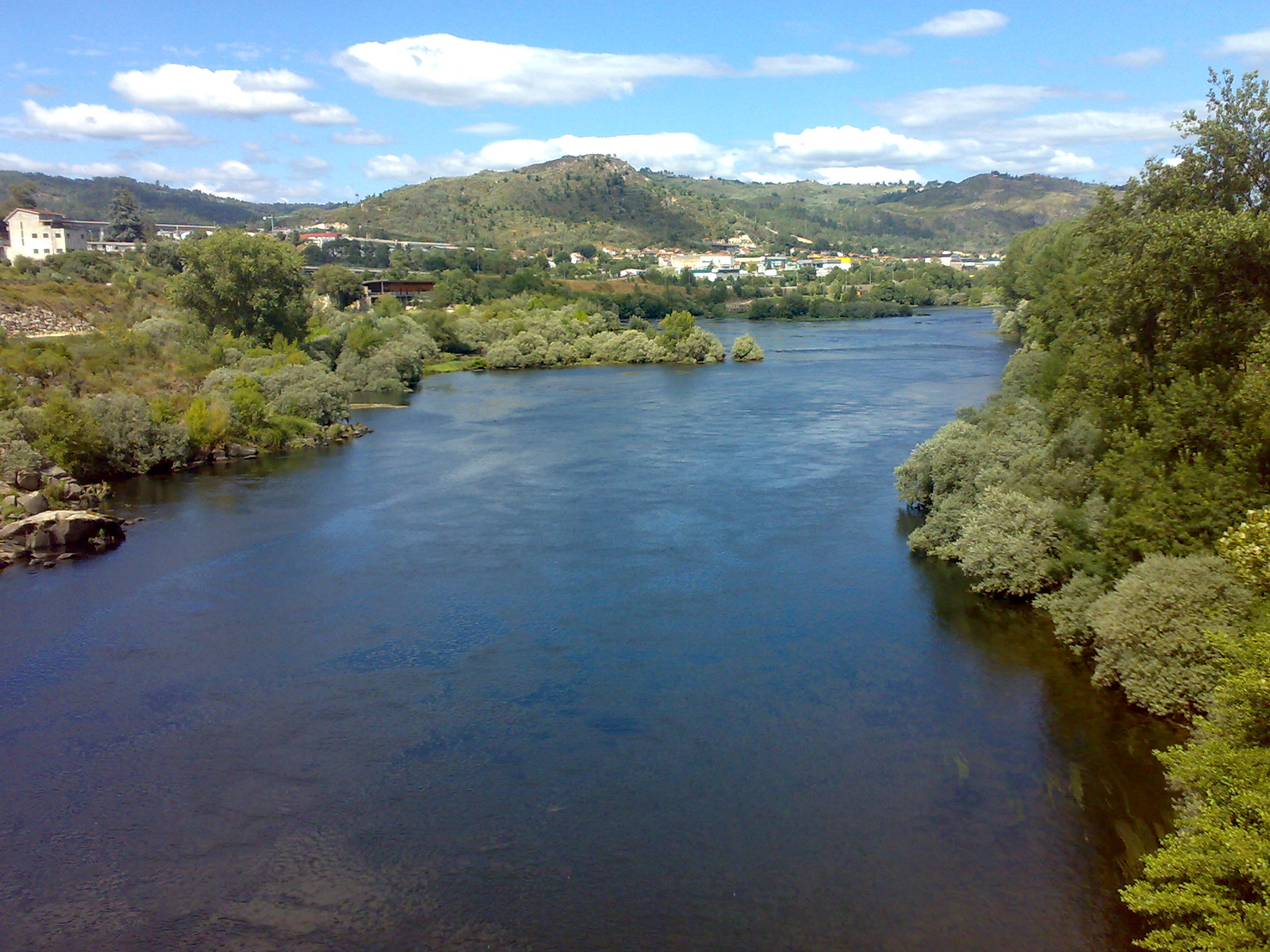
The Minho passing through Ourense.

- Minho/Miño (ms · int · 345 km; 214 mi of which the last 75.5 km or 46.9 mi form the Portugal–Spain border)
  - Parga (r · 30 km; 19 mi)
  - Ferreira (r · 42 km; 26 mi)
  - Sil (l · 225 km; 140 mi)
    - Boeza (l · 58 km; 36 mi)
      - Noceda (r)
    - Cúa (r · 60 km; 37 mi)
    - Cabrera (l · 63 km; 39 mi)
    - Bibey (l · 93 km; 58 mi)
    - Lor (r · 50 km; 31 mi)
    - Mao (l · 31 km; 19 mi) (Note: Not to be confused with the equally named Mao, a tributary of the Cabe (and thus, second-order tributary of the Sil).)
    - Cabe (r · 49 km; 30 mi)
      - Mao (r · 30 km; 19 mi) (Note: Not to be confused with the equally named Mao, a first-order tributary of the Sil.)
  - Avia (r · 38 km; 24 mi)
  - Arnoia (l · 88 km; 55 mi)
  - Deva (l)
  - Barxas/Troncoso/Trancoso (l · int)

=== Rias Baixas and Rias Altas ===
- Verdugo (39 km; 24 mi)
- Lérez (60 km; 37 mi)
- Umia (64 km; 40 mi)
- Ulla (126 km; 78 mi)
  - Sar (42 km; 26 mi)
- Tambre (134 km; 83 mi)
  - Samo (42 km; 26 mi)
  - Lengüelle (35 km; 22 mi)
- Xallas (62 km; 39 mi)
- Anllóns (55 km; 34 mi)
- Mandeo (57 km; 35 mi)
- Eume (84 km; 52 mi)

== Cantabrian watershed ==
This includes the rivers flowing into the Cantabrian Sea (as well as in the case of the Garonne the wider Bay of Biscay) east of the Punta de Estaca de Bares. They are chiefly short streams streaming down the Cantabrian Mountains and the southern slopes of the Pyrenees.

- Eo (ms · 79 km; 49 mi)
- Nalón (ms · 129 km; 80 mi)
  - Narcea (l · 107 km; 66 mi)
- Navia (ms · 159 km; 99 mi)
- Sella (ms · 56 km; 35 mi)
  - Dobra (r)
- Deva (ms · 60 km; 37 mi)
  - Cares (r · 50 km; 31 mi)
- Nansa (ms · 50 km; 31 mi)
- Saja (ms · 58 km; 36 mi)
  - Besaya (r · 47 km; 29 mi)
- Pas (ms · 50 km; 31 mi)
  - Pisueña (r · 33 km; 21 mi)
- Miera (ms · 39 km; 24 mi)
- Asón (ms · 39 km; 24 mi)
  - Gándara (r)
- Nervión/Nerbioi (ms · 69 km; 43 mi)
  - Cadagua
  - Ibaizabal
- Oria (ms · 66 km; 41 mi)
  - Leitzaran/Leizarán (r · 37 km; 23 mi)
- Urola (ms · 55 km; 34 mi)
- Urumea (ms · 40 km; 25 mi)
- Bidasoa (ms · int · 41.6 km; 25.8 mi of which the last ones form the France–Spain border)
  - Baztán (rs · 26.8 km; 16.7 mi)
  - Ezkurra (ls · 21.6 km; 13.4 mi)
- Garonne/Garona (ms · int · 602 km; 374 mi of which roughly 40 km (25 mi) run through Spain) (Note: The Garonne is a river that flows into the Gironde estuary in the Atlantic Ocean. Running roughly 40 km (25 mi) through Spain along its upper course, it is the only river in Spain that drains North of the Pyrenees into the Atlantic.)

== See also ==
- List of rivers of Catalonia
