= Manol (river) =

River in Catalonia, Spain

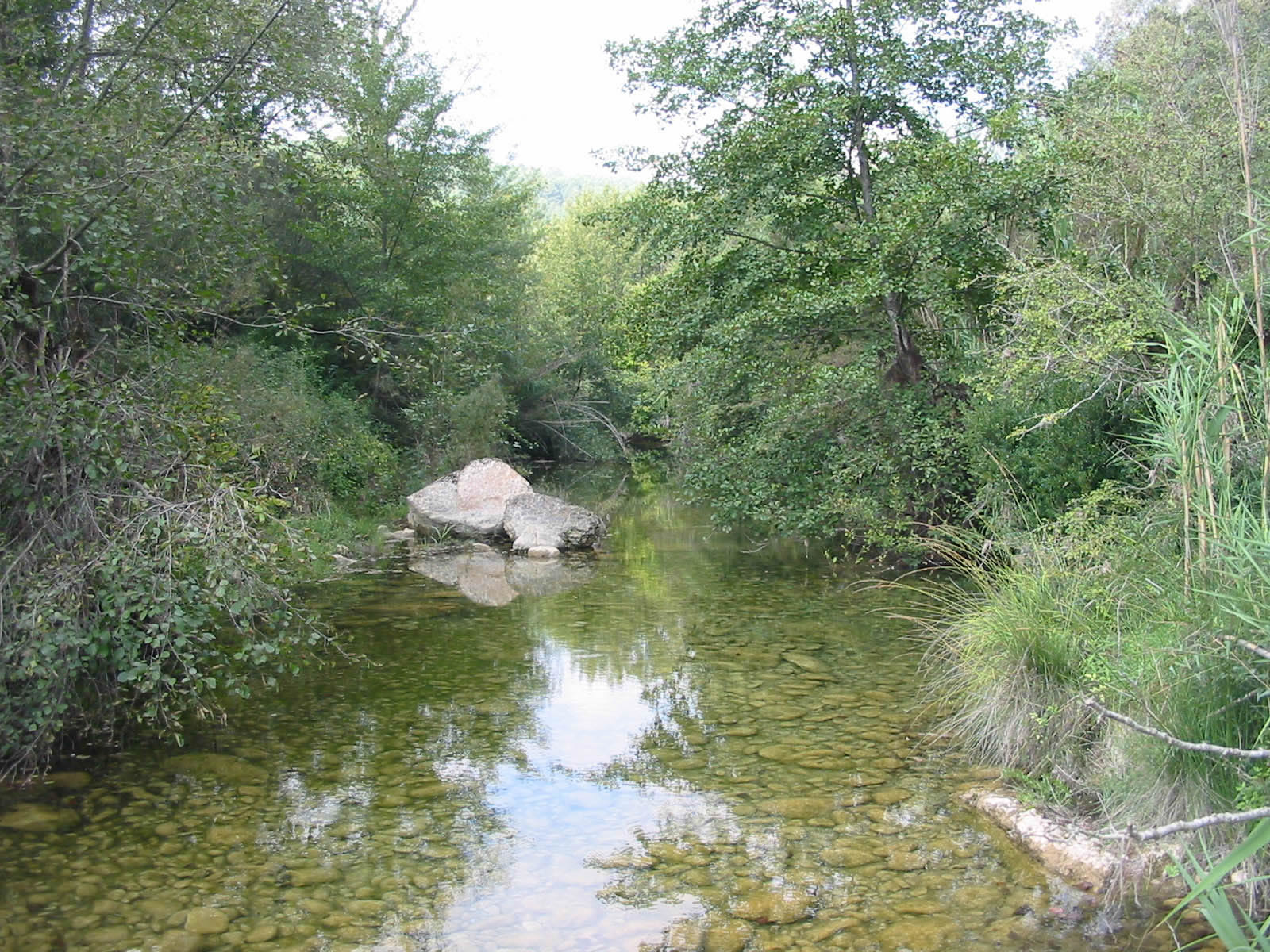
- View of the Manol River

Location
- Country: Spain

Physical characteristics
- Source
  - location: Albanyà
  - elevation: 1,089 m (3,573 ft)
- Mouth: Muga (river)
  - location: Vilanova de la Muga (ca)
  - coordinates: 42°17′42″N 3°01′09″E
- Length: 45 km (28 mi)
- Basin size: 150 km^{2} (58 sq mi)
- Discharge
  - average: 0.57 m^{3}/s (20 cu ft/s)

Basin features
- River system: Muga

The Manol (Catalan pronunciation: [məˈnɔl]) is a river in Alt Empordà, Catalonia, Spain. It is a seasonal river, and a tributary of the Muga. An emblematic bird of the river is the European bee-eater (Merops apiaster), a migratory bird that overwinters in tropical Africa.

== Course ==
The rivers begins near Albanyà at 1,089 m a.s.l., and flows through the municipalities of Cabanelles, Lladó, Navata, Avinyonet de Puigventós, Vilafant, Santa Llogaia d'Àlguema, Figueres, El Far d'Empordà, Vila-sacra, and Vilanova de la Muga (ca). At Vilanova de la Muga the river joins the Muga River that continues to the Mediterranean Sea.

== See also ==
- List of rivers of Spain
