= Trabancos (river) =

River in Spain

Coordinates: 41.449°N 5.184°W

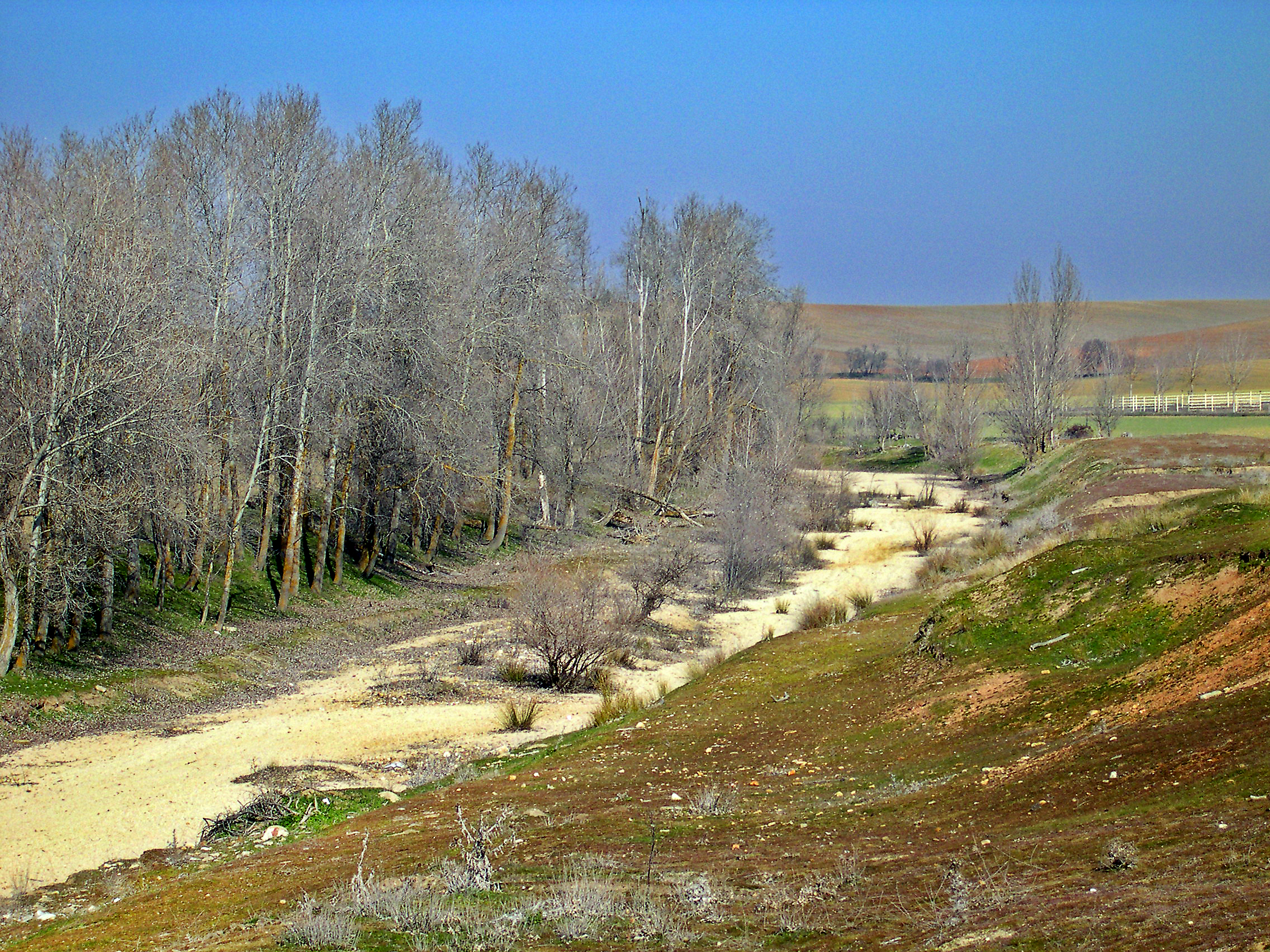
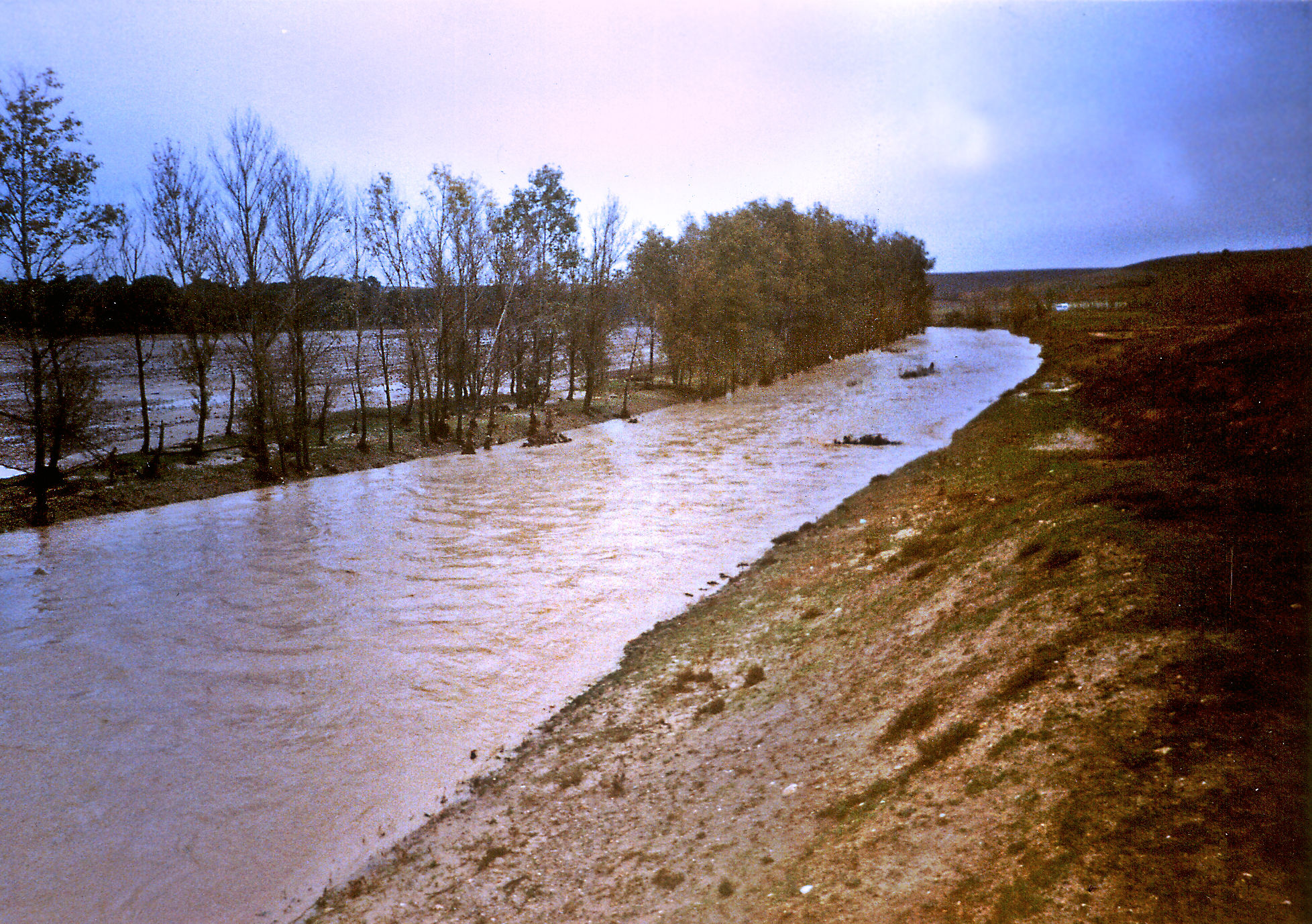
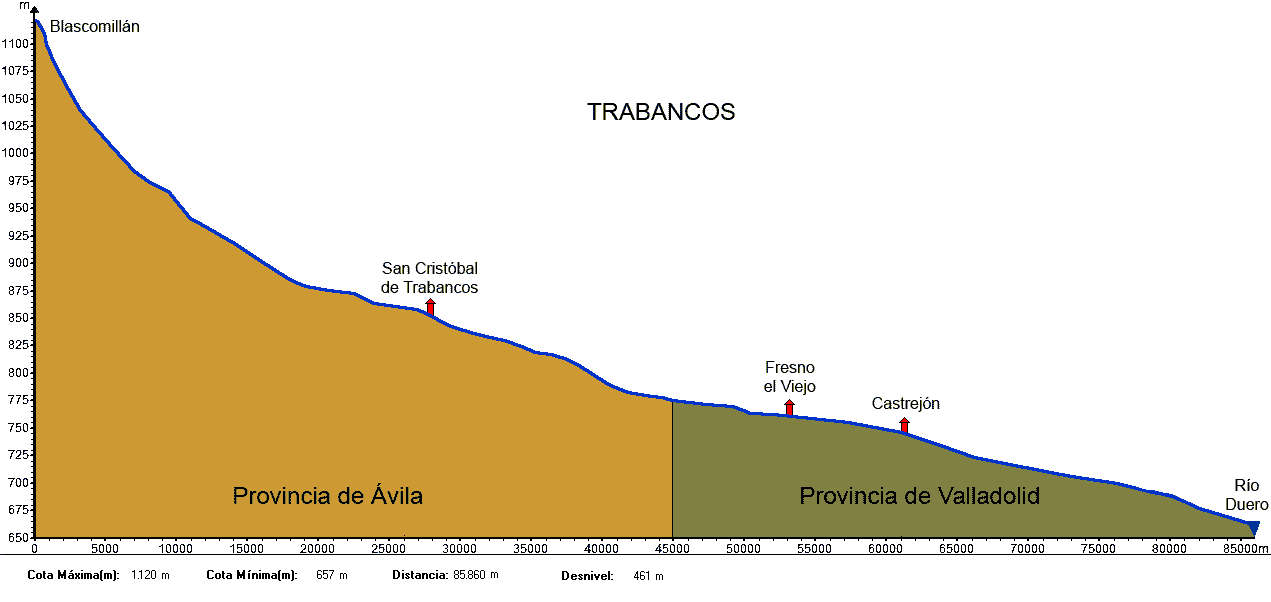
Trabancos River
.
State	Spain
Length	85.86 kilometres (53.35 mi)
Elevation at source	1,120 metres (3,670 ft)
Provinces	Ávila and Valladolid
River mouth	Duero River near the Village of Pollos (Valladolid province)
Elevation at mouth	657 metres (2,156 ft)
River - Hydrology

The Trabancos is a river in Spain that flows between the Zapardiel and the Guareña rivers, and is a tributary of the Duero river. The source of the Trabancos is in Moraña, a region in the north of the province of Ávila, near Blascomillán. The Trabancos is at an elevation of approximately 1,100 metres (3,600 ft), is approximately 85 kilometres (53 mi) long and, although its river bed is stable, only has a constant water flow during and immediately after torrential rains. The river's course is affected by a geologic fault, and the surrounding region has evidence of human habitation dating back to the prehistoric era.

== Fluvial geomorphology ==
From its source in the province of Ávila, to its mouth in the village of Pollos ("Village of Chickens" in Spanish) in the Vallisoletana ("confluence of waters") region, the course of the Trabancos is markedly affected by a geologic fault originating in the Tertiary era—likely pre-Pliocene that, like most of the observed faults of that geological era, follows a NNE-SSW direction. As shown in the graph below, the fault separates material laid down during the Oligocene epoch on the right margin, from material laid down during the Miocene epoch on the left margin. The surface level represents material deposited during the Quaternary period.

Archeological research in areas that surround the Trabancos River, between the villages of Castrejón and Pollos (Valladolid province) have been compared with the specialized bibliography and the published geological charts (infra). This produced identified a sequence of river terraces as follows, on the left hand margin of the chart: TT-1 platform (the most ancient, at +35/40 meters over the flood plain); the TT-2 platform (the second one at +25/30 meters); the TT-3 platform (at +15 meters over the floodplain); and the TT-4 platform (at +10 meters, the last and most recent).

The right hand margin of the designated chart depicts a gravel plateau present along the middle and final courses of the Trabancos River. The scientist Alfredo Pérez-Gonzalez named this formation "Superficie de Alaejos" ("The Plateau of Alaejos", after a nearby village). The Alaejos Plateau incorporates a number of different types of materials, including red argillic soil and a colluvium buildup of gravels with rounded stones of quartz and quartzite.

The terraces of the Trabancos River only occur on the left hand side of the valley. Their sediments overlie Miocene sediments. This is the result of a hard slope in the opposite margin, where the terrain is heavily eroded, which renders the formation and maintenance of river terraces impossible.

Cross section, depicting the fault that affects the middle and final courses of the Trabancos River as well as the sequence of its river terraces

Of the previously mentioned river terraces, the one known as TT-4 is only visible near Narros del Castillo (Ávila). Terrace TT-3 is the best preserved of the lot; although its height on the bed of the stream is not constant, it clearly stands out on the floodplain. Terrace TT-2 is quite well preserved as well, although it has been more heavily sculptured by other small tributaries of the Trabancos River. By contrast, terrace TT-1 is greatly eroded; although some sections survive to the south of the municipality of Alaejos (Valladolid), they are very difficult to differentiate from the colluvium floor that covers the Superficie de Alaejos. Entering into land in the municipality of Pollos, the stream stops to form river terraces, cutting traversely and lowering enough (between 40 and 60 meters) to meet the terrace deposits of the Duero River.

The TT-3 platform features a very compact and thick Miocene epoch conglomerate formed of river-smoothed pebbles of quartzite, most likely cut by the Trabancos River ages ago, and cemented together by chalk and sandstone materials. While this Miocene conglomerate emerges from the banks of each river terrace, the quartzite in the conglomerate on the TT-2 platform, just northwest of the municipality of Siete Iglesias de Trabancos, likely derives from the action of the Duero River rather than the Trabancos River, as a slope in the terrain is thought to have caused the formation of an alluvial fan that deposited quartzite on the fluvial fossil river bed of the Trabancos.

The fact that the river terraces of the Trabancos River cut and cross some terraces of the Duero River indicates the affected Duero River terraces are younger than those not formed from activity of the waters of this river. The "superficie de Alaejos" carve-out intrudes 4 to 6 meters into the Duero River terrace designated TD-7 (+74/80 m) to the northwest of Siete Iglesias de Trabancos village. Likewise, the TT-2 fluvial terrace of Trabancos cuts some Duero River terraces. Since the previously mentioned Duero River terrace named TD-7 has been dated by Alfredo Pérez-González (op.cit.) to the beginning of the Middle Pleistocene, meaning the river terraces of Trabancos River are younger than the "Superficie de Alaejos", it appears plausible that this postdates the creation of Trabancos valley: the proposed date could, thus, be halfway through the Middle Pleistocene or later.

== History of the Trabancos region ==
Although the eastern portion of the river is of insignificant hydrographic importance, at least until the 13th century, it played an important role in the history of the North Spanish Plateau.

=== Prehistoric era ===
Evidence of prehistoric human habitation has been unearthed in hillsides in some areas of Narros del Castillo (Ávila), and in Siete Iglesias de Trabancos (Valladolid), dating from the Quaternary period, and have been further pinpointed as originating in the Lower Paleolithic era. At both sites, collections of lithic stone artifacts knapped during the Acheulean period are found on the surface (not as a result of archeological excavation), including centripetally knapped lithic cores, others displaying non-arranged lithic reduction, as well as lithic flakes characteristic of both the Levallois and Kombewa techniques, chopping tools, and handaxes.

Lithic artifacts and tools from the Acheulean culture found in the fluvial quaternary terraces of Trabancos

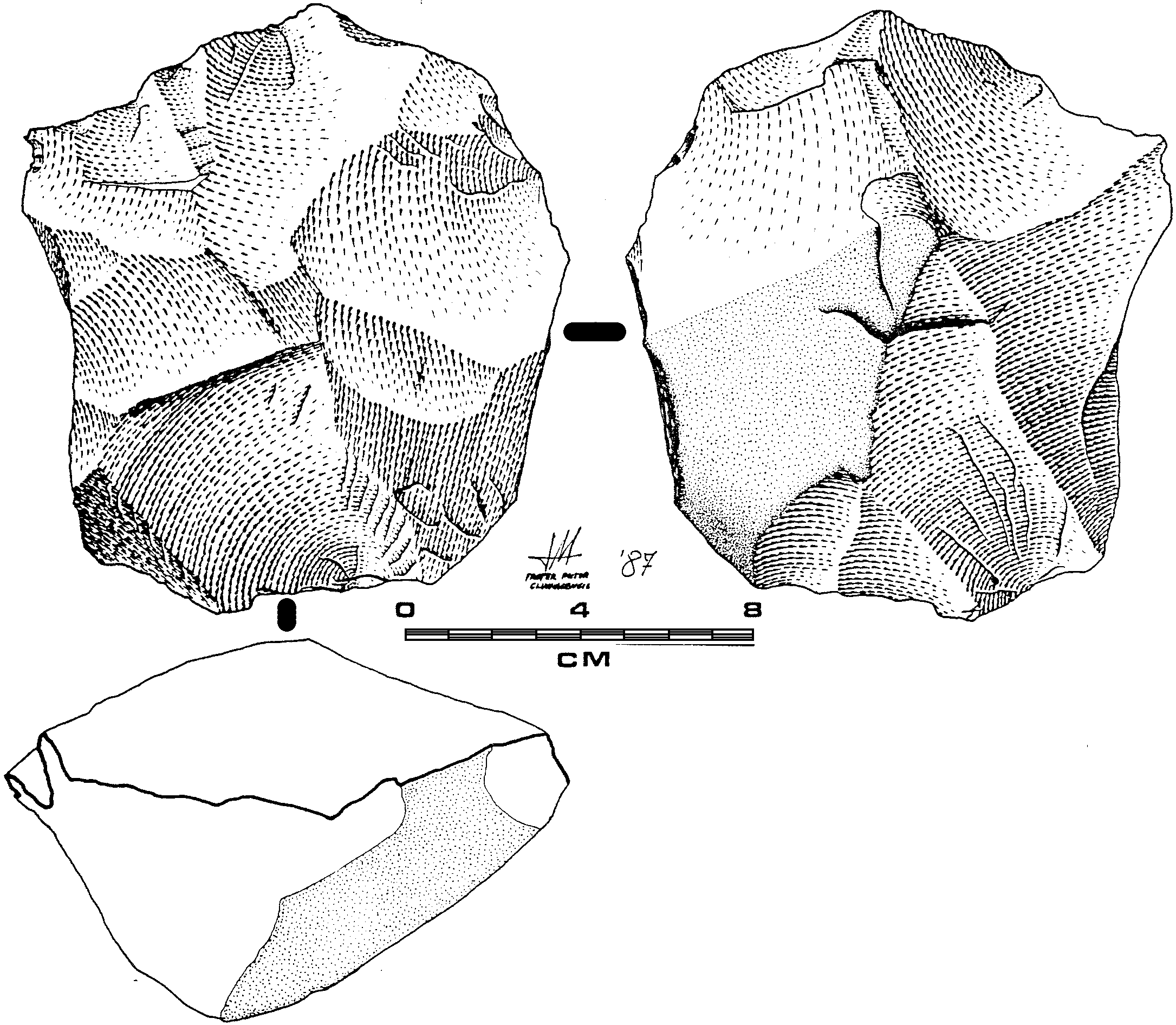
Centripetal lithic core

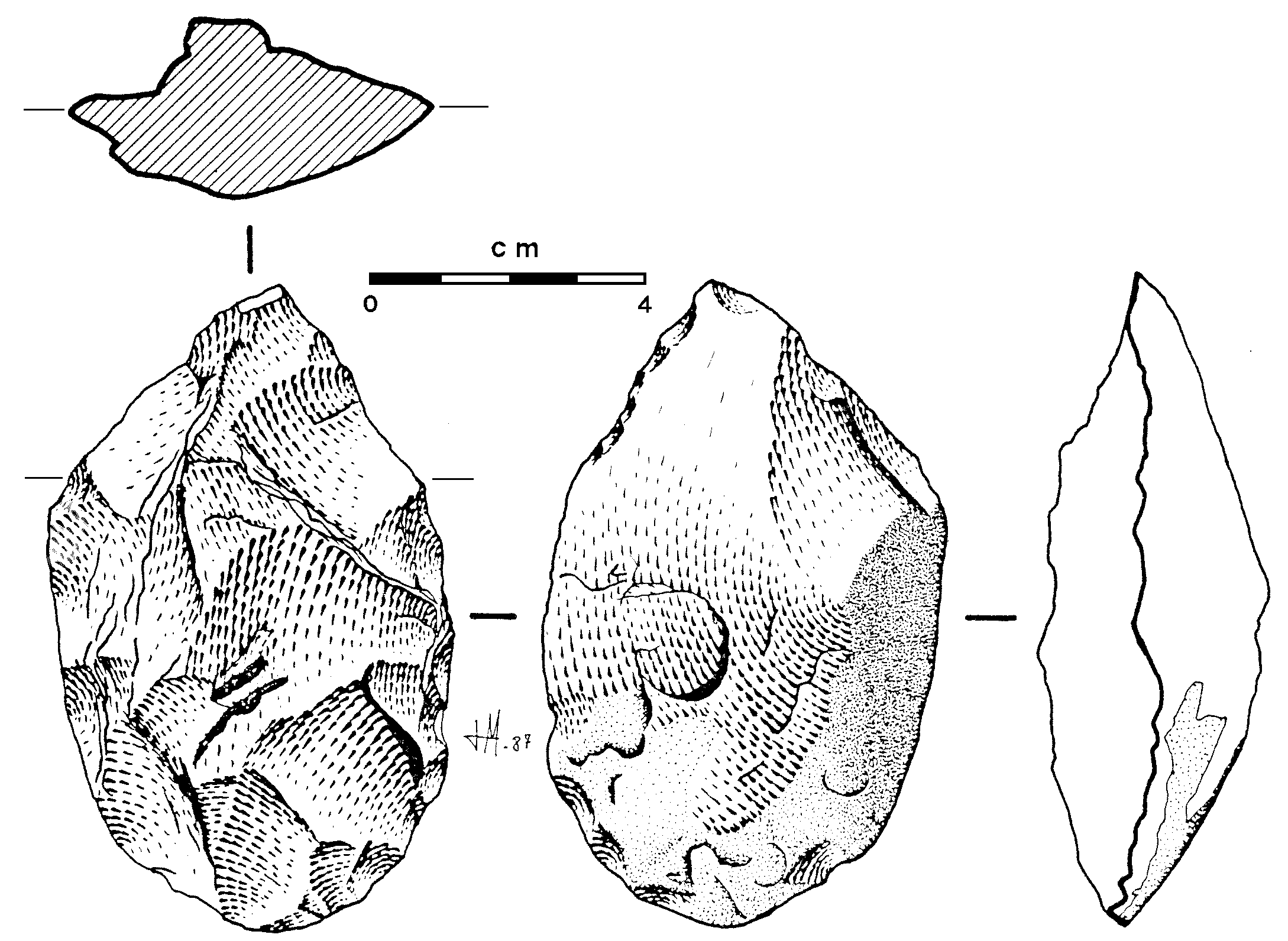
Lithic flakeHandaxe

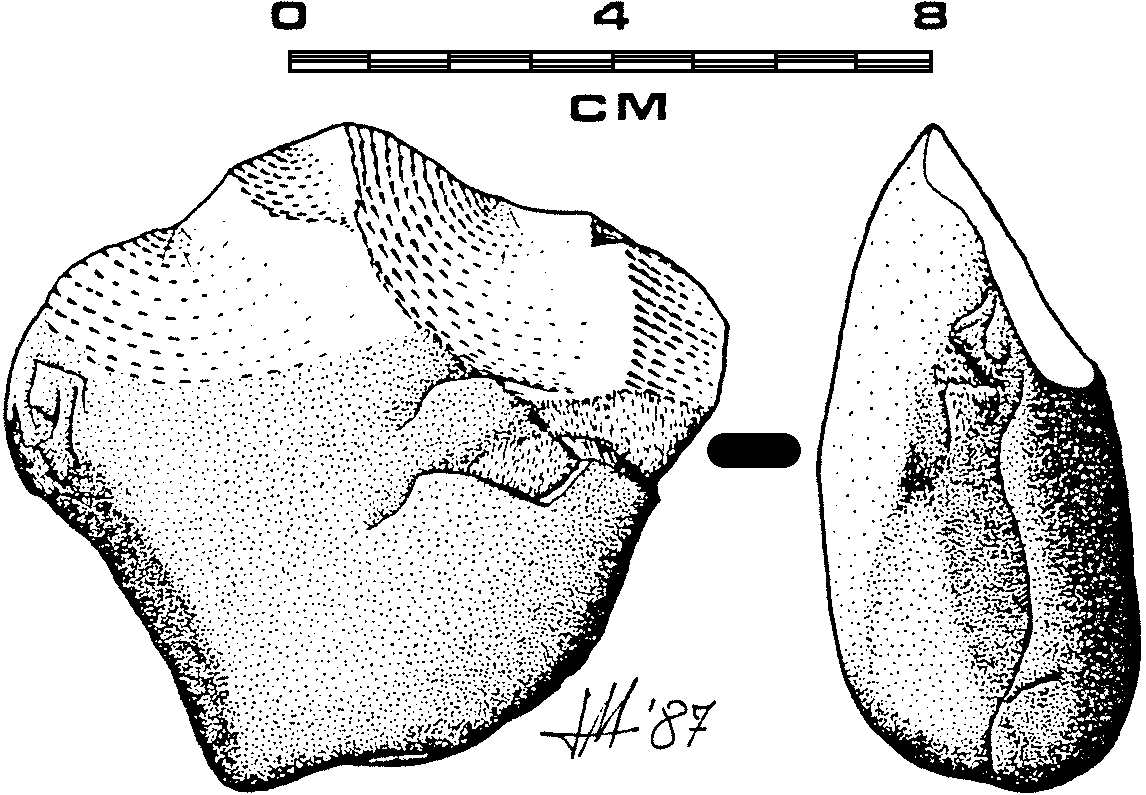
Chopper

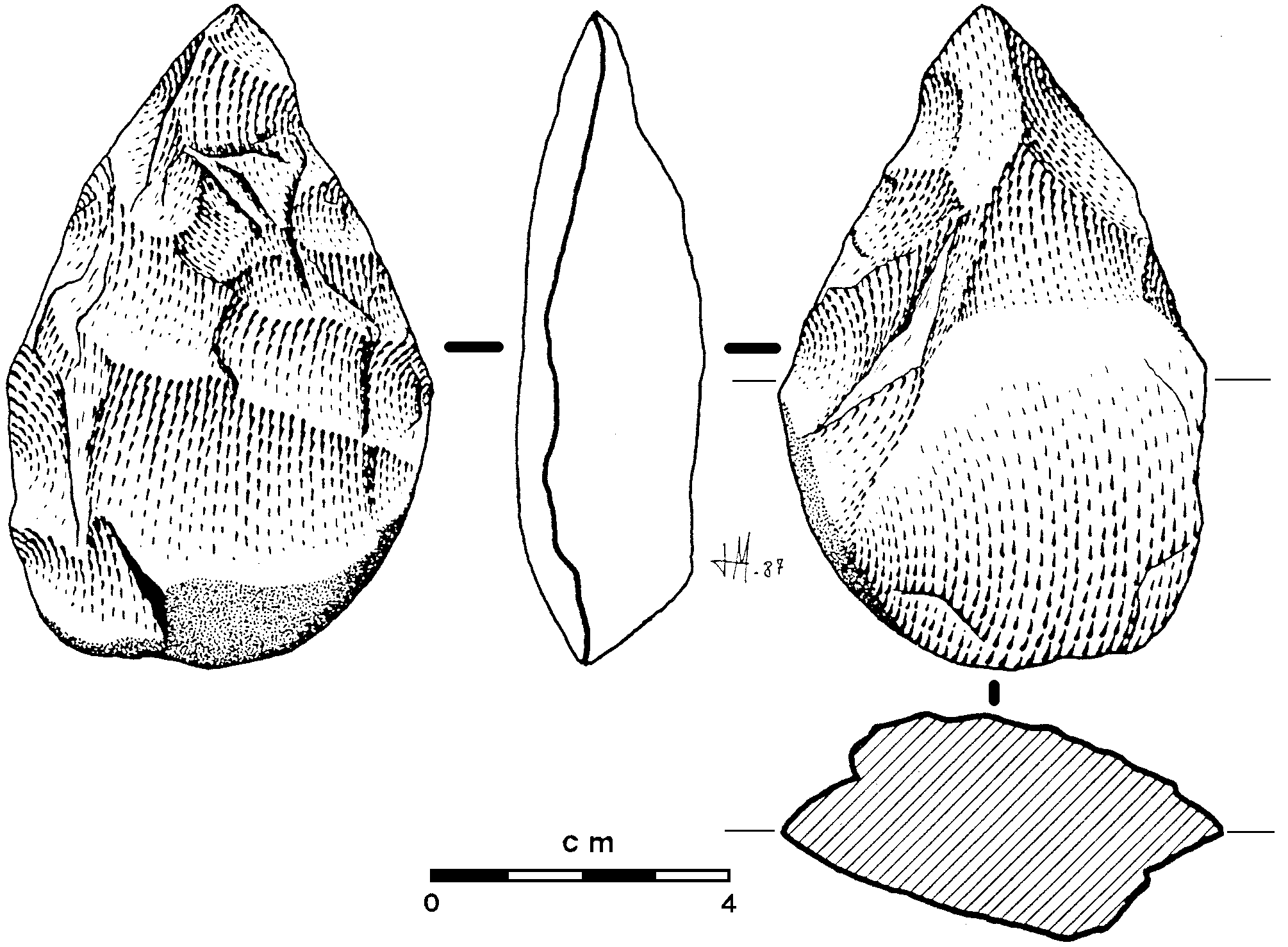
Another lithic flake handaxe

Only ambiguous archaeological evidence has been found dating from the late Roman period. It has been suggested by some that this is a result of the severity of the land and weather in the Trabancos valley and its surrounding regions. Possibly, during the pre-Roman period the territory was a no-man's-land between the Hispanic tribes of the Vaccei and Vettoni.

Some archaeological remains have been found in the municipality of Siete iglesias de Trabancos (Valladolid), but they are not well preserved, having been situated on the surface of the terrain. Such remains consist of, for instance, broken pieces of comb-decorated pottery that appear to date from Spain's Iron Age. There are few other examples of prehistoric findings directly along the Trabancos river. However, in the surrounding regions, such as the municipality of Alaejos (Valladolid), archaeological investigation has unearthed several human burials sites that have been dated to the Bronze Age. In addition, some prehistoric remains have been found near the mouth of the Trabancos River, in Pollos village that originated from the Duero River. These include relics of the Spanish Bronze Age classified as Cogotas pottery, as well as Proto-Cogotas pottery, both featuring incised decoration.

Roman pottery (Terra sigillata) found in Pollos village

Roman plate found near the Village of Nava del Rey

Archaeological remains of pottery found near the Trabancos river basin

=== Roman times ===
The Romans likely came to the Trabancos region in the 2nd century, during the campaigns of Lucius Licinius Lucullus (152 BC), but the area was peripheral to the regions of principal occupation, as well as to the creation of early towns and more importantly, trade routes: most travel routes were in the east of this region, which followed the river Eresma from the town of Coca (Cauca, in Roman times) and Matapozuelos village (Nivaria in Roman times), up to Simancas (Septimanca); and at the west, for the "Vía de la Plata" ("silver road"), the most important Roman route in Lusitania Province. Nevertheless, it is known that in the Vallisoletan area, there were several villages that probably are of pre-Roman origin. In fact, the etymology of the word 'Trabancos' suggests a name originating before the Roman occupation.

At the Lavachicha site (municipality of Castrejón, Valladolid) several pieces of typical Roman pottery named terra sigillata hispanica have been unearthed and there was also an archaeological excavation in the 1980s that revealed a necropolis from late Roman times or, perhaps, from Visigothic times. Similar remains of late Roman pottery, have been found in Carpio (Valladolid), but only at ground level, and not from archaeological excavation. Another municipality crossed by the Trabancos River is Nava del Rey (a small town located in Valladolid), where, once again, are found superficial pieces of terra sigillata hispanica and a striking plate fragment with red gloss, resembling those that were carried by Roman legionaries on military campaigns.

=== The Middle Ages ===
In the Middle Ages, the area remained a zone of little interest. No written documents exist prior to the 12th century that mention the region. It is known, however, that between 711 and 740 AD the Berbers had stationed troops in the valley of the Duero, but the majority of these peoples left the area because of a severe drought that occurred sometime between 750 and 753 AD. Only the most important centers of habitation survived (Medina del Campo, Olmedo, Alcazarén, Tordesillas, etc.).

During the Christian conquest, little emphasis was placed on resettling the region, as it was essential for the sovereigns of the time to consolidate more strategic zones (in the 11th century, priority was placed on the south of the Sistema Central, a mountain range located in the center of the Iberian Peninsula), which is why Medina del Campo remained intact into the 12th century.

Nevertheless, Tomas Mañanes, a professor at the University of Valladolid, who investigated the Trabancos valley and Guareña area, found numerous defensive turrets or "Torrejones" (according to the local dialect) that were dated to the 11th century; that is to say, previous to any official resettlement. Specifically, more than ten defensive structures of various sizes were verified along the course of the Trabancos River in the province of Valladolid.

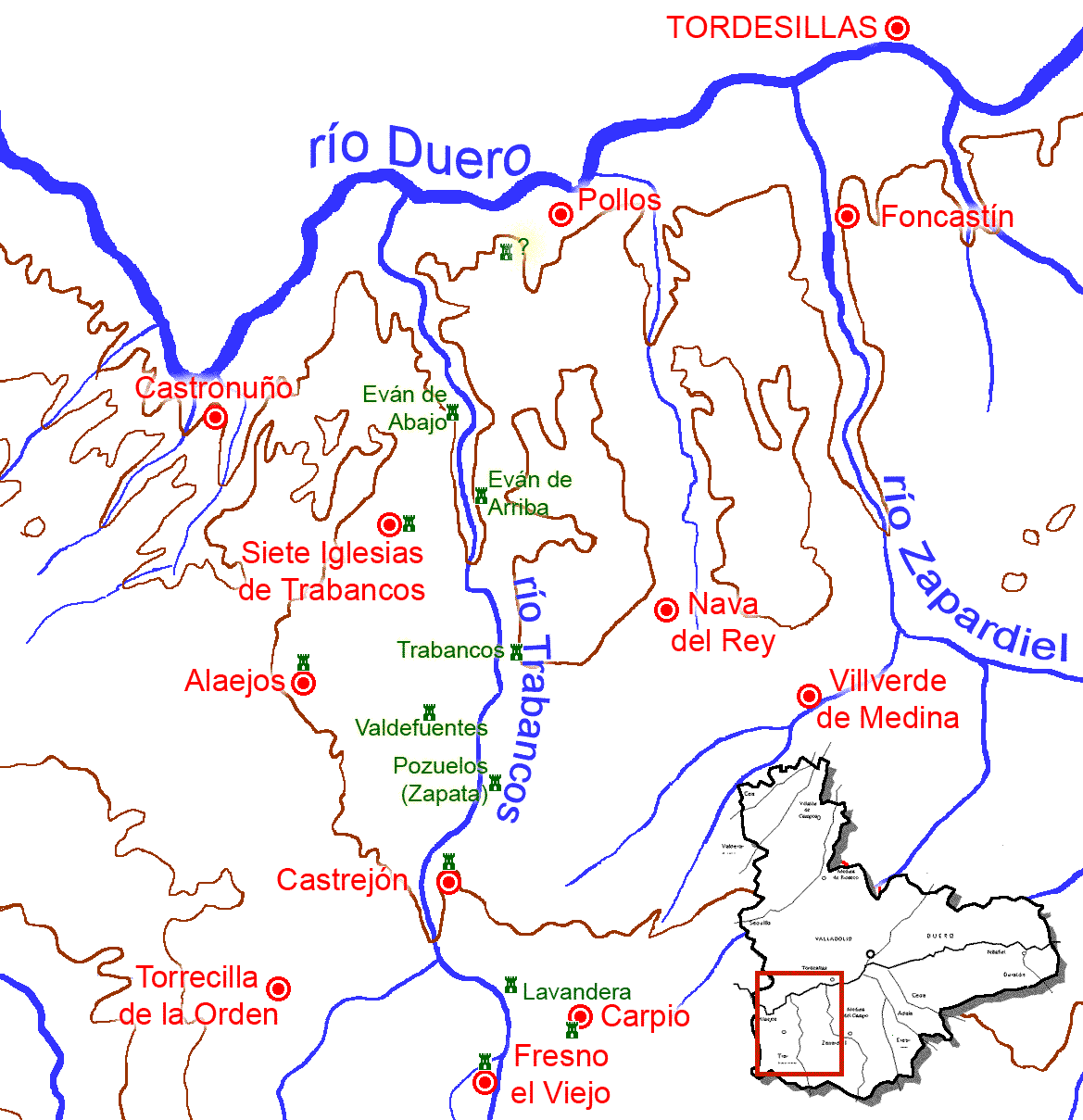
Map showing distribution of medieval forts in the border region between the Kingdoms of Castile and León in the 12th century

==== Character and purpose of the Torrejones ====
Almost all the torrejones are in areas now uninhabited (except those in Castrejón and Alaejos, both of which were turned into castles, in later history). The torrejones were relatively simple square or egg-shaped structures, with several floors, built of limestone or brick. At least two categories of torrejones can be identified: The first have small peepholes in their walls and are built in regions that were in isolated areas at the time of use, and the other are small castles located in what were rural farming villages (though today they are deserted).

Nevertheless, the typological similarity of the structures and the relatively short distance between them (ideal for visual communication), has led some to think that they were on opposite sides of the frontier line between the Kingdoms of León and Castile (in Salamanca there is a town names Zorita de la Frontera ("Zorita on the Border") in memory of those times). These fortresses were reinforced in the 12th and 13th centuries due to conflicts between the two kingdoms; but it appears that they are more plentiful on the Castilian side (near the Trabancos) than on the Leonese side (near the River Guareña). This has been seen as indicative of a certain independence on the part of the militia of the Community of Medina del Campo and surrounding areas, which was thereby forced to defend itself without outside help, while the Leonese side would have been able to rely on the help of Royal troops, and the Knights Hospitaller of the Order of Saint John of Jerusalem, billeted in Castronuño and Torrecilla de la Orden.

==== Trabancos River area becomes strategically important ====
As indicated at the start of the discussion of the area during the Middle Ages, despite its history as a fortified border from the tenth century, the area was unimportant until the thirteenth. The King of the (now united) Kingdom of Castile and Leon, Alphonse VII (1126–1157), made a series of internal territorial changes that transferred Leonese territories to the Crown of Castille: specifically, The Tierra de Campos to the north of the Duero, an area valued at the time for its riches, and the alfoz de Medina del Campo (to the south of the Duero), a poor and sparsely populated zone, although it possessed a certain strategic value in terms of the defense of the passes of the Duero valley. During the time of the union of the two crowns, the question of who owned these areas was of little importance; however, upon the death of Alphonse VII and the division of his possession amongst his sons, continuous conflicts arose over the control of the area, especially Tierra de Campos, but also, though less importantly, over the area of Medina del Campo.

The wars over the area intensified between 1178 and 1181. The Leonese Alfoz de Toro was heavily defended, thanks to the Fortress of Castronuño, with a vicious battle taking place even on the shores of the Trabancos River itself. Of particular note is an encounter in 1179 between Leonese and Castilian forces, just outside the Fortress of Cast'cam (Castrejón), which led to the signing of a peace treaty between Alphonse VIII of Castille and Ferdinand II of León. But in fact peace came to a swift end in the year 1183, when the Kings of Castille and Leon made camp on the outskirts of the towns of Carpio and Fresno el Viejo (both towns in the Province of Valladolid) respectively.

After the death of Ferdinand II, fighting resumed (interspersed with a short truce in 1204 thanks to the marriage of Alphonse IX of León to his niece, Berenguela of Castile); but the marriage was annulled by her father because of the close blood-relationship of the spouses. Finally, the Crowns of both kingdoms were taken by King Ferdinand III of Castile.

The logical conclusion of these events was that the border was heavily militarized, involving the building of castles and reinforcements of troops in the areas surrounding the Trabancos River, with some castles being erected in the west, such as in Alaejos. Paradoxically, the wars increased the value of the region, and for the first time there began to appear documents recording the area in the files of the cathedrals of Zamora, Salamanca and Segovia including documents regarding: Siete Iglesias de Trabancos ("Seven Churches at Trabancos") in 1178, Alaejos (Falafeios) in 1167, and in 1180, Eván de Arriba, Eván de Abajo, Valdefuentes and Pedroso (which are now deserted villages), together with Nava del Rey in 1265, among others.

This last date, 1265, corresponds to a document found in the 'Book of Loans' of Salamanca cathedral, which records the result of a new conflict: the battle between the dioceses of Salamanca and Segovia for the possession of the parishes to the east of the Trabancos; an area that hitherto had been accorded little worth. Salamanca had made use of the frontier struggles to take possession of the towns of Medina del Campo, provoking a conflict of interest since the region was under Castilian rule, and Salamanca belonged to the crown of León. In fact, the Salmantinos created new parishes, like Siete Iglesias de Trabancos in 1167, and Alaejos in 1185.

=== Trabancos River area today ===
Looking at the Trabancos today and at a time when it is dry, it might seem preposterous that at one time it held a position of strategic importance for the town of Medina del Campo, and also, for the so-called "Extremadura Catellana" (the wildest border of Castile). However, the area's archaeological heritage is fast disappearing.

== ZEPA designation ==
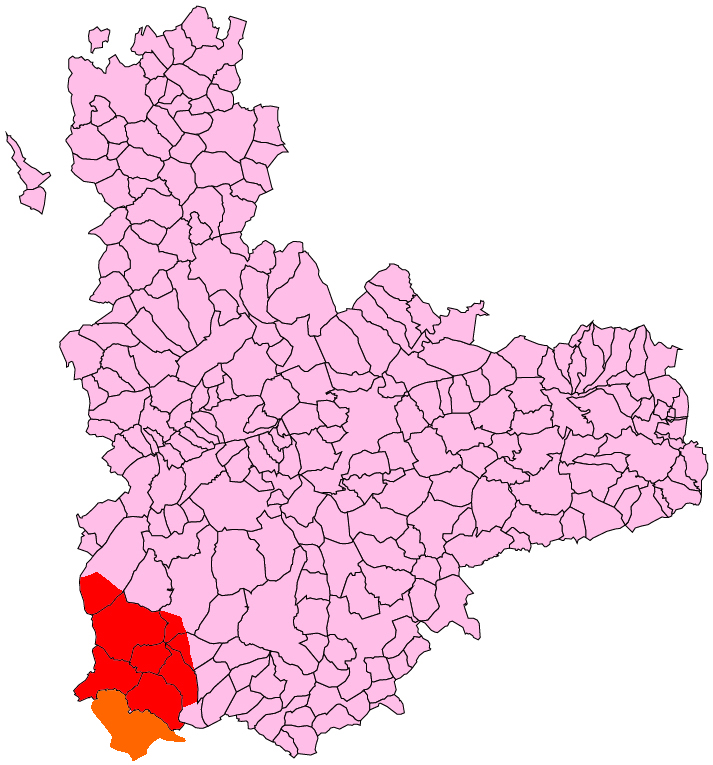
Map showing the ZEPA SPA designated territory. The red-colored area corresponds to the province of Valladolid, and the orange corresponds to Salamanca and Ávila.

The middle and final course of the river Trabancos has been included in the Special Protection Area (SPA or in Spanish ZEPA) Tierra de Campiñas (Land of champaigns).

ZEPA SPAs, are catalogued by the member states of the European Union as natural zones of special interest for the conservation of bird species threatened with extinction, in accordance with the criteria established by the community board Birds Directive 79/409/CEE and subsequent modifications by the (Directiva de Aves) "Aviary Regulation Board" of the EU.

Although the designation also includes a portion of the Guareña River's course to the west, and the Zapardiel River's course to the east, the Trabancos River ZEPA SPA designated area is the largest in the Autonomous Community of Castile and León, since it covers almost 1,400 square kilometres, including the Campo de Peñaranda (in Salamanca), the Moraña (in Ávila) and, especially, a large part of the Tierra de Medina del Campo. In all, 73% of the territory of the Trabancos ZEPA SPA corresponds to the province of Valladolid.

The designated region is largely uninhabited —97% of the area is agricultural land, with an emphasis on cereal crops and other irrigation farming purposes. The areas of ecological interest are found in the remaining 3% percent of the terrain. The region is characterized by tilled land and pastures, small pine woods and holm oak woods, with interspersed wasteland areas covered in halophile bushes. There are also many small ephemeral ponds; a characteristic of Spanish steppes, which are only water-filled during the winter. From a conservation standpoint, such ponds, like nearby segments of the Trabancos River's banks, are in a precarious ecological state. Nevertheless, the areas are still capable of sustaining the flora and fauna commensurate with a natural riverside environment.

The Trabancos region stands out for its concentration of great bustards (more than 2000); as well as having the largest reproductive concentration of black-bellied sandgrouses (Pterocles orientalis) in Castile and León (with more than 200 mating pairs). It is also the winter season nesting ground of more than 1,500 red kites (Milvus milvus). There are also numerous birds of prey; the most abundant are Montagu's harriers (Circus pygargus, 50 mating pairs) and lesser kestrels (Falco naumanni; almost 150 mating pairs), but there are also hawks, goshawks, falcons, owls, and others. The region is also host to numerous gamebirds, including the red-legged partridge (Alectoris rufa).

Despite their importance, the population of little bustard (Tetrax tetrax) in the region appear to be diminishing. Although not all the species protected in this ZEPA SPA can be listed, the protected area is a migratory crossing site and wintertime nesting area that, along with the Riberas de Castronuño (Valladolid) nature reserve, is frequented by many waterfowl (cranes, geese, etc.), some of which even take advantage of the area ephemeral ponds for nesting during humid winters.

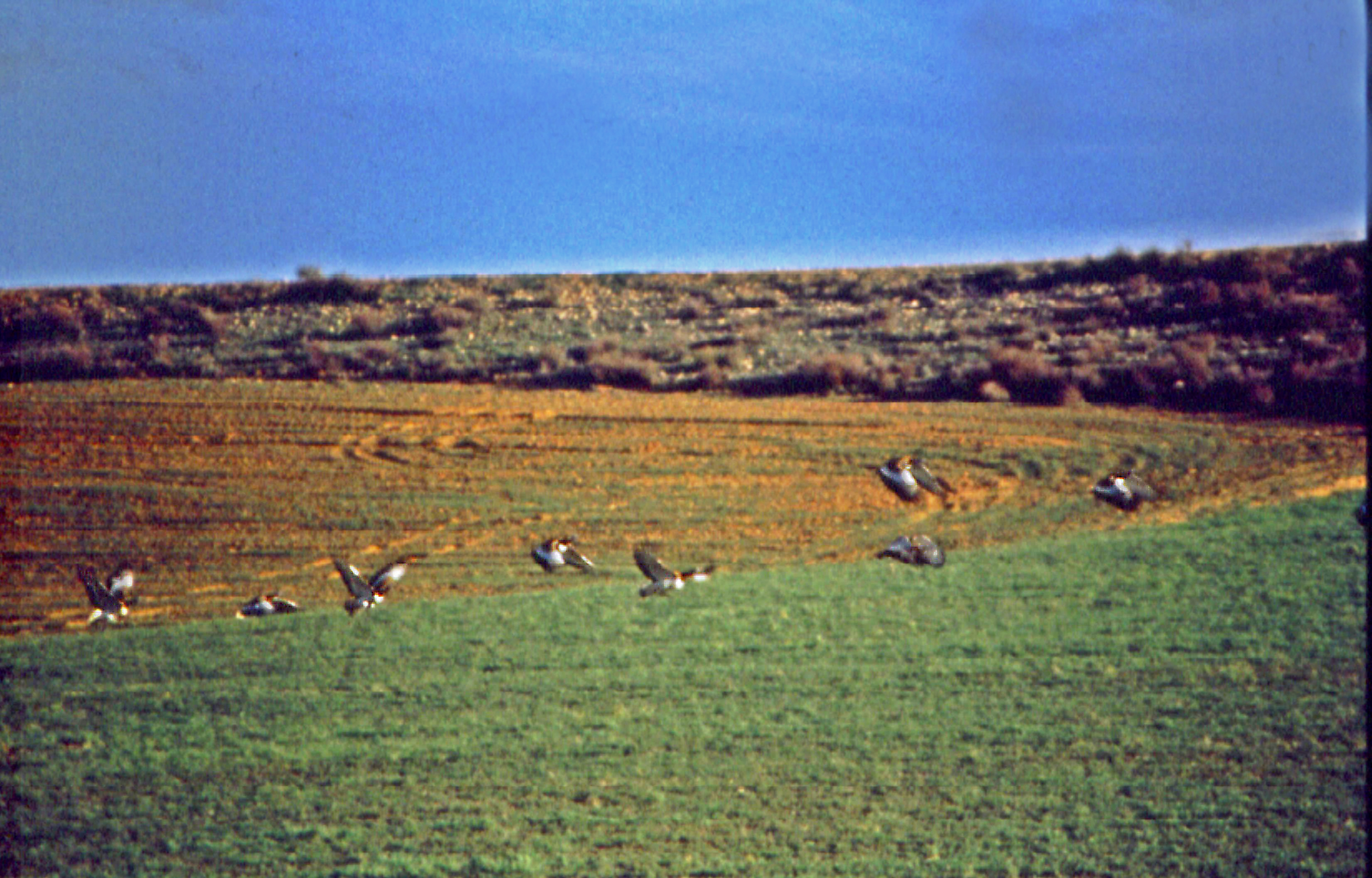
Great bustard in Alaejos

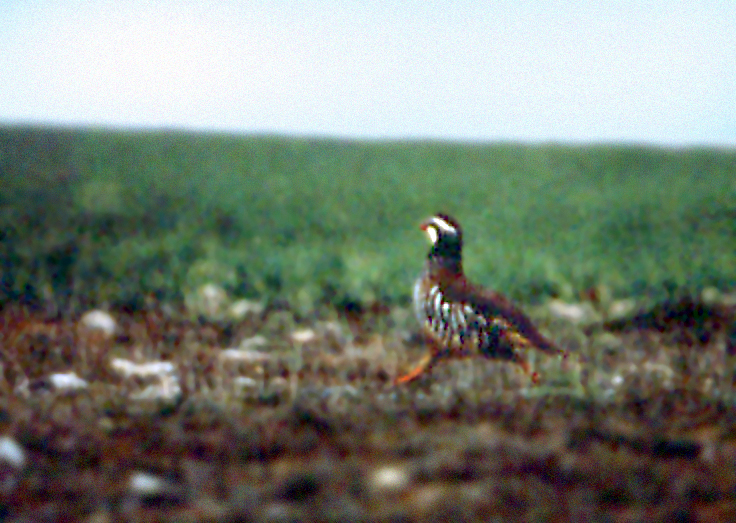
Running red-legged partridge

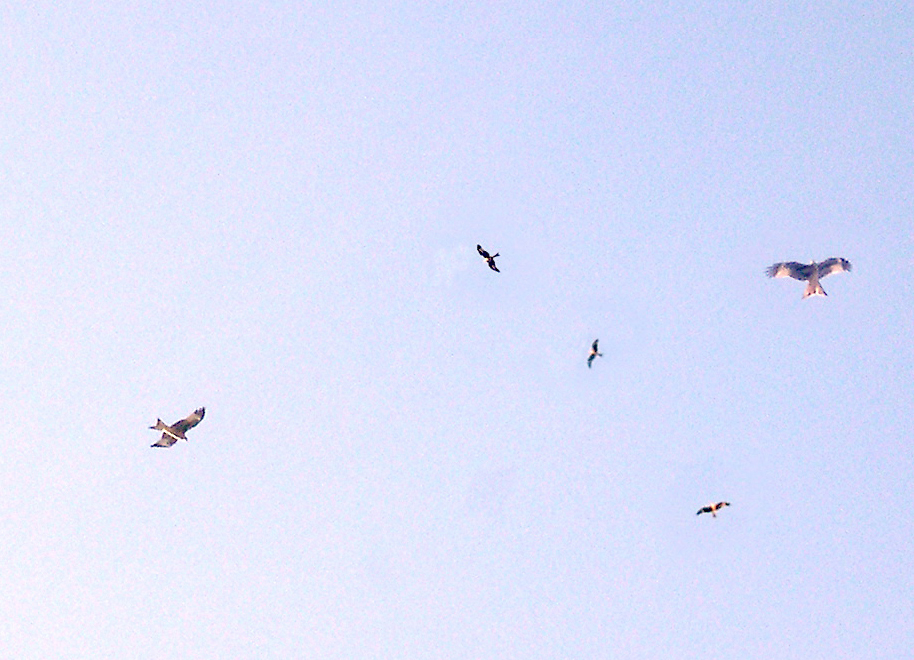
Red kites gathering for the winter season

== References and notes ==
- Zonas de especial protección para las aves (ZEPA). From the Spanish-language Wikipedia. Retrieved April 10, 2006.
- Michelin 2001 - 2006. map of Ávila Province. Retrieved April 10, 2006.
- Pearson Education, publishing as Fact Monster 2000–2006. Geologic Timescale. Retrieved April 10, 2006.
- Trabancos. From the Spanish-language Wikipedia. Retrieved April 10, 2006 and including the internal references:

== See also ==
- List of rivers of Spain
