= Ungría =

Ungría is a surname. Notable people with the surname include:

- Alfonso Ungría (born 1943), Spanish screenwriter
- Ricardo de Ungria, Filipino poet
