= Gallo (river) =

- The Gallo as it passes through the Barranco de la Hoz

Location
- Country: Spain

Physical characteristics
- Source
  - location: Sierra del Tremedal
  - coordinates: 40°31′N 1°41′W
- Mouth
  - location: Tagus
  - coordinates: 40°47′51″N 2°9′17″W
- Length: 85 km (53 mi)
- Basin size: 1,311 km^{2} (506 sq mi)

Basin features
- Progression: Tagus→ Atlantic Ocean

The Gallo is a river in the centre of the Iberian Peninsula, a right-bank tributary of the Tagus. It joins the Tagus in the latter's upper course.

It has its source in the Sierra del Tremedal, close to the municipality of Orihuela del Tremedal (province of Teruel). It has a length of 85 km. The river bends to the north in the settlement of Orihuela del Tremedal and it enters the province of Guadalajara.

It discharges into the Tagus near the San Pedro Bridge.
