= Valdemembra =

River in Spain

Coordinates: 39°09′N 1°43′W

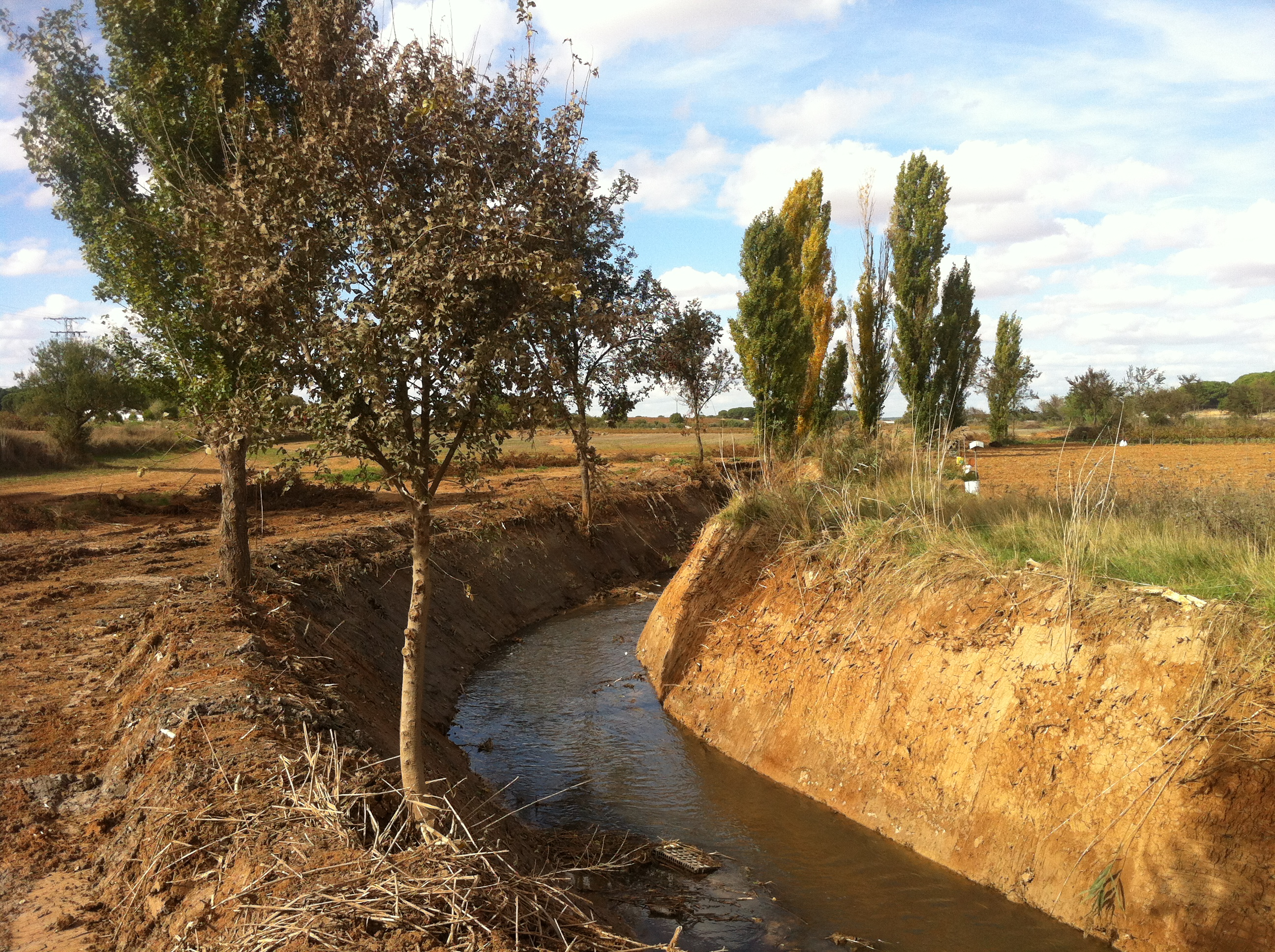
Valdemembra river

Valdemembra is a river in the provinces of Albacete and Cuenca, Spain. It has a length of 85 km and is a tributary to the Júcar river.
