= Barxas =

River in Iberian peninsula

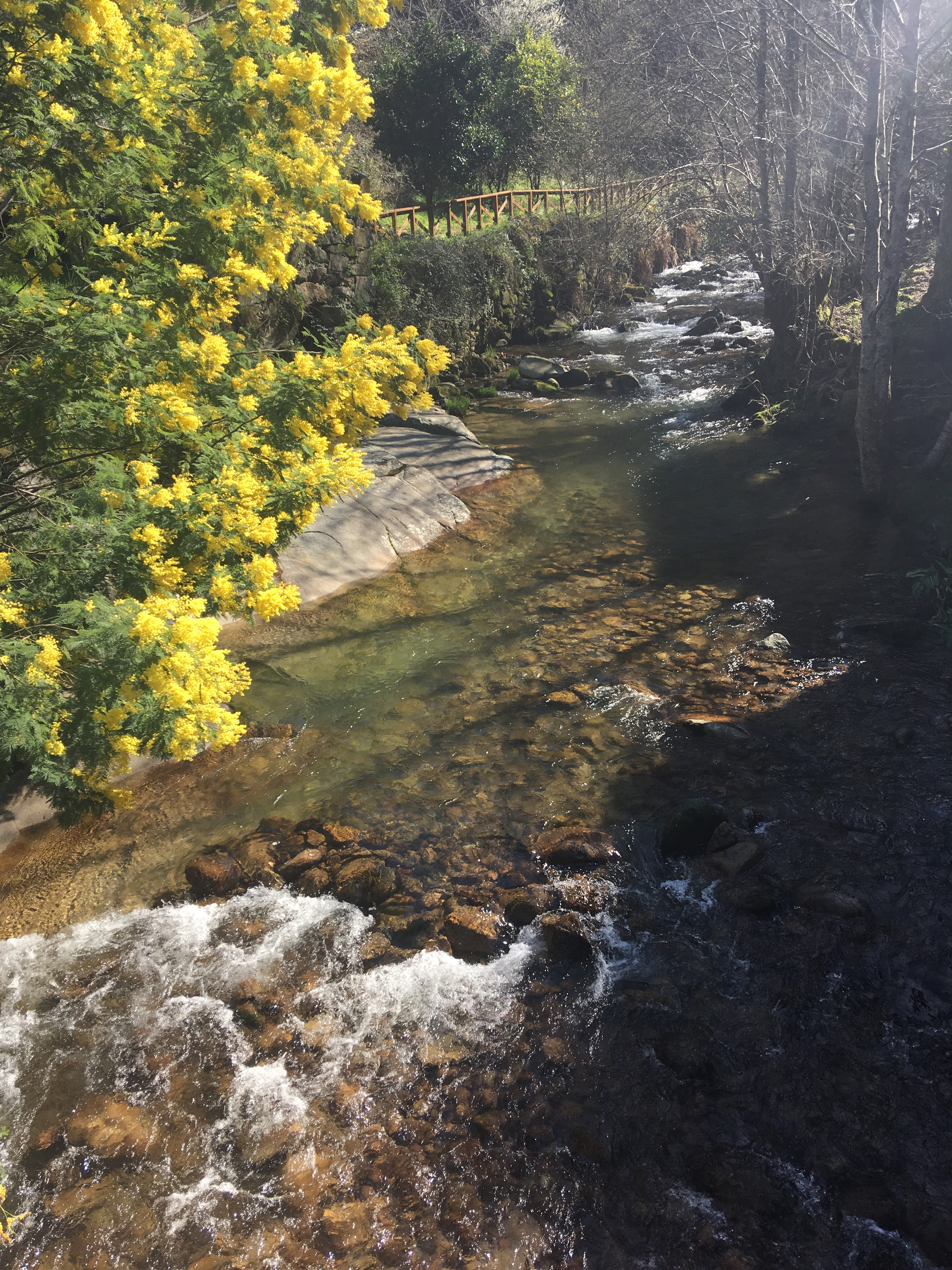

Location
- Country: Portugal, Spain

Physical characteristics
- Source: Sierra del Laboreiro
  - location: Portugal
- Mouth: Minho
  - coordinates: 42°9′15″N 8°11′54″W
- Length: 14 km (8.7 mi)

Basin features
- River system: Minho

The Barxas, Trancoso or Troncoso (also Barjas) is a river in the northwestern Iberian Peninsula, a left-bank tributary of the Minho. It is an international river as it conforms along most of its lower course the Portugal–Spain border (the Raia/Raya), separating the Portuguese municipality of Melgaço from the Spanish municipality of Padrenda. The point close to the river source where the border stops following water streams adjusting to the summits of the Laboreiro mountains instead can be considered as the beginning of the 'dry' Raia. It has a total length of 14 km.
