= Noceda (river) =

River in León Province, Castile and León, Spain

Noceda is a river in León Province, in the northwestern part of the autonomous community of Castile and León, in northwestern Spain.
