= Manadero =

River in Spain

Coordinates: 41.2147°N 3.0397°W

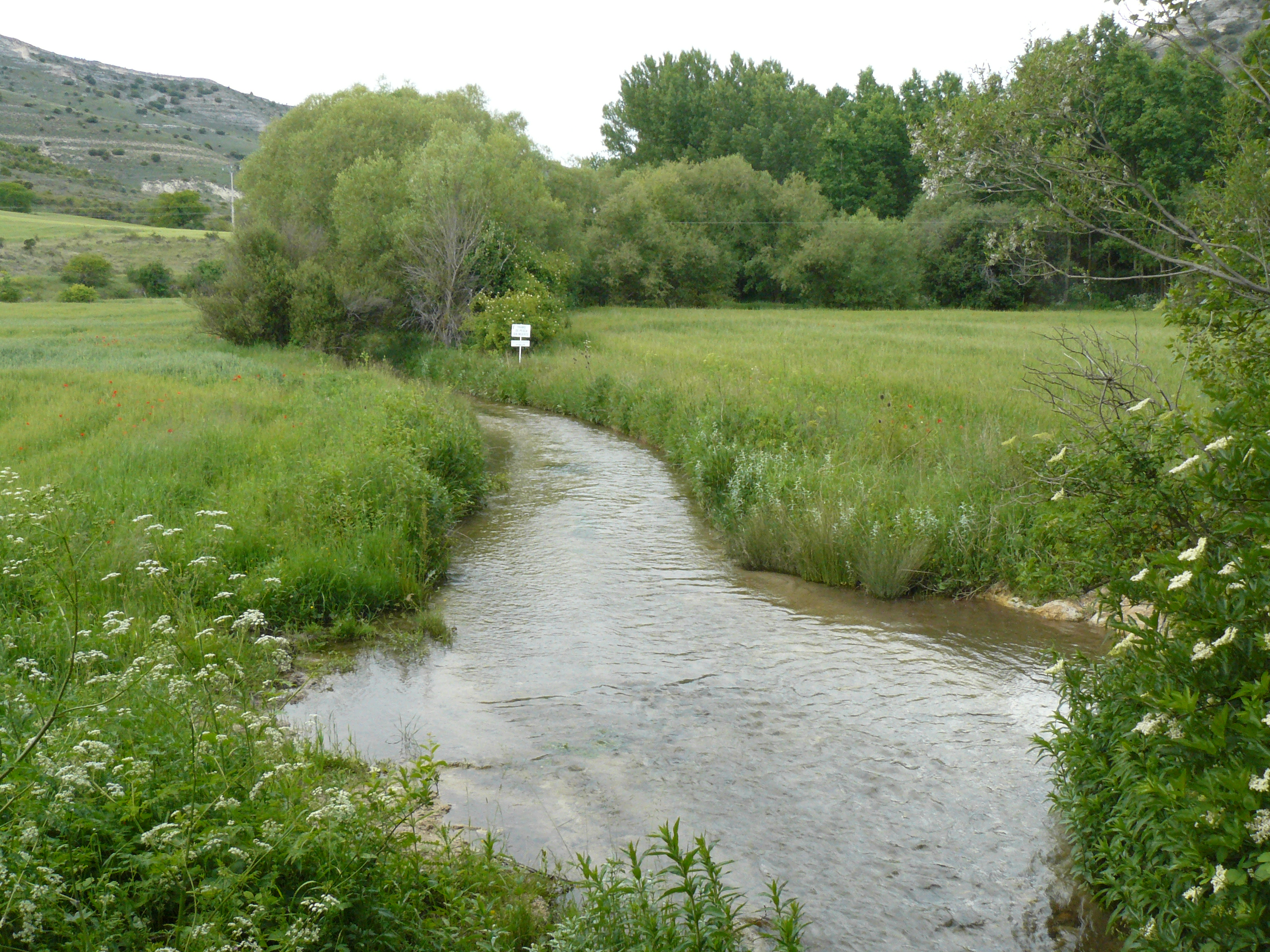
The Manadero river

The Manadero (Spanish: Río del Manadero) is a river of the Province of Guadalajara, Spain. A tributary of the Bornova River, it flows for 7 kilometres (4.3 mi). Its source is at Portillo in the Sierra de Pela mountains.
