= De la Torre =

De La Torre
- Language: Spanish

Origin
- Meaning: "Of the Tower"
- Region of origin: Spain, Mexico, Cuba, Philippines, Puerto Rico, Colombia

Other names
- Variant forms: La Torre, Latorre, Torres

De la Torre, usually written as de la Torre, and sometimes spelled De La Torre in the Philippines, is a Spanish surname meaning "of the Tower". It may refer to:

== People ==
- Adela de la Torre, American professor
- Adela de la Torre de Lope (born 1962), Spanish politician
- Ángel de la Torre (1896–1983), Spanish golfer
- Andrea de la Torre (born 1990), Spanish handballer
- Antonio de la Torre, multiple people
- Anthony De La Torre (born 1993), American actor
- Arath de la Torre (born 1975), Mexican actor and comedian
- Alethse de la Torre Rosas, Mexican physician
- Alonso Lizaola de la Torre (born 1973), Mexican politician
- Bernardo de la Torre, Spanish explorer
- Carlos de la Torre (born 1966), Spanish long-distance runner
- Carlos de la Torre y Huerta (1858–1950), Cuban naturalist
- Carlos Lozano de la Torre (born 1960), Mexican politician
- Carlos Ferreira de la Torre (1914–1990), Spanish sculptor
- Carlos María de la Torre (1873–1968), Ecuadorian Catholic cardinal
- Carlos María de la Torre y Navacerrada (1809–1879), Spanish general and politician
- Claudio de la Torre, multiple people
- Cuauhtémoc Gutiérrez de la Torre (born 1968), Mexican lawyer and politician
- David de la Torre (born 1981), Mexican football manager and player
- Diego de la Torre (born 1984), Mexican footballer
- Eduardo de la Torre (born 1962), Mexican footballer
- Eduardo de la Torre Jaramillo (born 1968), Mexican politician
- Edwin Sandoval de la Torre (born 1979), Mexican actor and singer
- Eric de la Torre (1918–2011), British soldier
- Estela de la Torre (born 1965), Mexican gymnast
- Facundo de la Torre (1570–1640), Spanish Catholic prelate
- Francisco de Borbón y de la Torre (1882–1952), Spanish general and politician
- Francisco de la Torre (1460–1504), Spanish composer
- Francisco de la Torre (fencer) (born 1952), Cuban fencer
- Francisco de la Torre (poet) (1534–1594), Spanish poet
- Francisco de la Torre (politician) (born 1942), Spanish politician
- Francisco Javier de la Torre, Spanish captain general
- Franco de la Torre (born 1996), Filipino footballer
- Gabriel García de la Torre (born 1979), Spanish footballer
- Gabriel Quadri de la Torre (born 1954), Mexican politician
- Gaspar de la Torre y Ayala (died 1745), Spanish general
- Geovanna Bañuelos de la Torre (born 1980), Mexican politician
- Hector De La Torre (born 1967), Mexican American politician
- Ignacio de la Torre y Mier (1866–1918), Mexican businessman and politician
- Iñaki Montes de la Torre (born 2002), Spanish tennis player
- Inés de la Torre, 1st Countess of la Torre (d. 1618), Spanish countess and spy
- Isabella de la Torre (born 2004), Mexican YouTuber and singer
- Laura de la Torre (born 1974), Spanish volleyball player
- Lillian de la Torre (1902–1993), American novelist
- Luz Elena González de la Torre (born 1974), Mexican actress and model
- Jacobus de la Torre (1608–1661), Flemish Catholic apostolic vicar and archbishop
- Javier de la Torre (1923–2006), Mexican footballer
- Jesús Alí de la Torre (born 1963), Mexican politician
- Jesús Fernández Sáenz de la Torre (born 1993), Spanish footballer
- José Aponte de la Torre (1941–2007), Puerto Rican politician
- José De La Torre (born 1985), Puerto Rican baseball player
- José de la Torre (sport shooter) (1913–???), Mexican sports shooter
- José de la Torre Sánchez (born 1956), Mexican politician
- José de la Torre Ugarte y Alarcón (1786–1831), Peruvian lyricist
- José Manuel de la Torre (born 1965), Mexican footballer
- José María Díaz de la Torre (1813–1888), Spanish journalist, poet and politician
- José María de la Torre Martín (born 1952), Mexican Catholic bishop
- José Ramón de la Torre (1935–2022), Puerto Rican academic
- José Rey de la Torre (1917–1994), Cuban guitarist
- José Rollin de la Torre-Bueno (1871–1948), Peruvian American entomologist
- Josefina de la Torre (1907–2002), Spanish poet, novelist, and actress
- Juan de la Torre y Castro (1607–1662), Spanish Catholic prelate
- Lisandro de la Torre (1868–1939), Argentine politician
- Luca de la Torre (born 1998), American soccer player
- Luis de la Torre, Spanish conquistador
- Luis López de la Torre Ayllón (1799–1875), Spanish diplomat and politician
- Luisa Gómez de la Torre Paez (1887–1976), Ecuadorian feminist and educator
- Luisana Lopilato de la Torre (born 1987), Argentine actress and model
- Manuel de la Torre (born 1980), Mexican footballer
- Manuel de la Torre (golfer) (1921–2016), Spanish American golfer
- Manuel de la Torre Gutiérrez (1635–1694), Spanish Catholic prelate
- María Natividad Venegas de la Torre (1868–1959), Mexican Catholic nun
- Martha de la Torre (born 1957), Ecuadorian American publisher and entrepreneur
- Miguel A. De La Torre (born 1958), Cuban American professor
- Miguel de la Torre (1786–1843), Spanish general and governor
- Miguel De La Torre Sobrevilla, Peruvian engineer and entrepreneur
- Milagros de la Torre (born 1965), Peruvian photographer
- Mike De La Torre (born 1986), American mixed martial artist
- Miriam Cárdenas de la Torre (born 1977), Mexican politician
- Néstor Martín-Fernández de la Torre (1887–1937), Spanish painter
- Orlando de la Torre (1943–2022), Peruvian footballer
- Pedro de la Torre (d. 1573), Spanish Catholic prelate
- Pedro Muñoz de la Torre (born 1966), Mexican footballer
- Raf De La Torre (1905–1975), British actor
- Ralph de la Torre (born 1966/67), Cuban American health care executive and cardiac surgeon
- Reginaldo Rivera de la Torre (born 1960), Mexican politician
- Rufino Rodríguez de la Torre (1902–????), Argentine sailor
- Santos de la Torre (born 1942), Mexican artist
- Tomás de la Torre Gibaja (1570–1630), Spanish Catholic prelate
- Vanessa de la Torre (born 1978), Colombian journalist
- Víctor Raúl Haya de la Torre (1895–1975), Peruvian politician and philosopher
- Yolanda de la Torre (born 1964), Mexican politician

== See also ==
- Alhaurín de la Torre CF, a Spanish football club
- Capella de la Torre, a municipality within the Province of Guadalajara, Castilla–La Mancha
- Cendejas de la Torre, a municipality within the Province of Guadalajara, Castilla–La Mancha
- Cevico de la Torre, a municipality within the Province of Palencia, Castilla y León
- De la Torre Bueno Prize
- Molí de la Torre, a Catalan farmhouse
- Puerto de la Torre, a district in the city of Málaga, Andalusia
- Rebolledo de la Torre, a municipality within the Province of Burgos, Castilla y León
- San Bartolomé de la Torre, a town within the Province of Huelva, Andalusia
- Serra de la Vall de la Torre, a Catalan mountain range
- Torrecilla de la Torre, a municipality within the Province of Valladolid, Castilla y León
- Villagarcía de la Torre, a municipality within the Province of Badajoz, Extremadura
- Villanueva de la Torre, a municipality within the Province of Guadalajara, Castilla–La Mancha
