= List of Bienes de Interés Cultural in the Province of Girona =

This is a list of Bien de Interés Cultural landmarks in the Province of Girona, Catalonia, Spain.

== Bien by municipality ==
=== A ===
Agullana

Bien de interés cultural in Agullana
Name of monument	BIC type	Type	Coordinates	BIC#	Date	Image
Església de Santa Maria	Monument	Religious Architecture	42.394169°N 2.846497°E	RI-51-0005082	10 April 1984	

Albanyà

Bien de interés cultural in Albanyà
Name of monument	BIC type	Type	Coordinates	BIC#	Date	Image
Mas Sobirà	Monument	Civil architecture	42.344189°N 2.59387°E	RI-51-0005784	8 November 1988	n/a
Porta de la muralla d'Albanyà	Monument	Civil architecture	43.036376°N 2.50416°E	RI-51-0005782	8 November 1988	
Torre de Cursavell	Monument	Civil architecture	42.312698°N 2.664734°E	RI-51-0005783	8 November 1988	n/a

Avinyonet de Puigventós

Bien de interés cultural in Avinyonet de Puigventós
Name of monument	BIC type	Type	Coordinates	BIC#	Date	Image
Castell d'Avinyonet	Monument	Castle	42.249438°N 2.914542°E	RI-51-0003236	21 February 1989	

=== B ===
Bàscara

Bien de interés cultural in Bàscara
Name of monument	BIC type	Type	Coordinates	BIC#	Date	Image
Castell de Bàscara	Monument	Castle	42.159966°N 2.909072°E	RI-51-0005798	8 November 1988	n/a
Castell de Calabuig	Monument	Castle	43.036376°N 2.50416°E	RI-51-0005799	8 November 1988	n/a
Castell d'Orriols	Monument	Castle	42.124964°N 2.90694°E	RI-51-0005800	8 November 1988	n/a
Muralles de Bàscara	Monument	Defensive architecture	42.160859°N 2.910011°E	RI-51-0005797	8 November 1988	

Biure

Bien de interés cultural in Biure
Name of monument	BIC type	Type	Coordinates	BIC#	Date	Image
Castell de Biure	Monument	Castle	42.339629°N 2.891303°E	RI-51-0005811	8 November 1988	n/a

Boadella i les Escaules

Bien de interés cultural in Boadella i les Escaules
Name of monument	BIC type	Type	Coordinates	BIC#	Date	Image
Castell de Les Escaules	Monument	Castle	42.31892°N 2.880692°E	RI-51-0005816	8 November 1988	
Castell-palau de Boadella	Monument	Castle	n/a	RI-51-0005815	8 November 1988	n/a

Borrassà

Bien de interés cultural in Borrassà
Name of monument	BIC type	Type	Coordinates	BIC#	Date	Image
Castell de Creixell	Monument	Castle	42.22493°N 2.92751°E	RI-51-0005819	8 November 1988	n/a

=== C ===
Cabanes

Bien de interés cultural in Cabanes
Name of monument	BIC type	Type	Coordinates	BIC#	Date	Image
Castell de Cabanes	Monument	Castle	42.307059°N 2.977187°E	RI-51-0005821	8 November 1988	

Cadaqués

Bien de interés cultural in Cadaqués
Name of monument	BIC type	Type	Coordinates	BIC#	Date	Image
Casa de Salvador Dalí	Monument	Museum	42.293216°N 3.28606°E	RI-51-0009157	12 November 1997	
Castell de Sant Jaume	Monument	Castle	42.29029°N 3.280716°E	RI-51-0005823	8 November 1988	
Torre de los Baluard	Castle	Civil architecture	42.287494°N 3.277214°E	RI-51-0005822	8 November 1988	
Núcli urbà de Cadaqués	Historic group	n/a	42.287529°N 3.275843°E	RI-53-0000485	18 December 1995	
Cala de Port Lligat	Monument	Historic site	42.312698°N 2.664734°E	RI-54-0000008	9 October 1953	n/a
Portlligat i Cap de Creus	Monument	Historic site	42.312698°N 2.664734°E	RI-54-0000042-00015	24 October 1972	n/a

Cantallops

Bien de interés cultural in Cantallops
Name of monument	BIC type	Type	Coordinates	BIC#	Date	Image
Castell de Cantallops	Monument	Castle	42.422456°N 2.924913°E	RI-51-0005847	8 November 1988	

Castelló d’Empúries

Bien de interés cultural in Castelló d’Empúries
Name of monument	BIC type	Type	Coordinates	BIC#	Date	Image
Fort Fuseller (Baluard or Torre Carlina)	Monument	Tower	42.25537°N 3.072332°E	RI-51-0005859	8 November 1988	
Església de Santa Maria d'Empúries	Monument	Church	42.259509°N 3.07586°E	RI-51-0000569	3 June 1931	
La Casa Gran	Monument	Building	42.260797°N 3.075603°E	RI-51-0005857	8 November 1988	
Muralles i Porta de la Gallarda	Monument	Battlement	42.260511°N 3.076359°E	RI-51-0005856	8 November 1988	
Palau Comtal (Convento de Santo Domingo)	Monument	Palace	42.258052°N 3.073936°E	RI-51-0005858	8 November 1988	
Torre Ribota	Monument	Tower	n/a	RI-51-0005860	3 June 1931	n/a
Zona dels estanys i la platja	Monument	Historic site	n/a	RI-54-0000042-00013	3 June 1931	n/a

Cistella

Bien de interés cultural in Cistella
Name of monument	BIC type	Type	Coordinates	BIC#	Date	Image
Castell de Vilarig	Monument	Castle	42.286271°N 2.833727°E	RI-51-0005869	8 November 1988	

=== F ===
El Far d'Empordà

Bien de interés cultural in El Far d'Empordà
Name of monument	BIC type	Type	Location	Coordinates	BIC#	Date	Image
Castell del Far	Monument	Castle	El Far d'Empordà	42.251783°N 2.996014°E	RI-51-0005895	8 November 1988	n/a
Església fortificada de Sant Martí del Far	Monument	Church	El Far d'Empordà	42.251902°N 2.99611°E	RI-51-0005896	8 November 1988	

=== G ===
Garrigàs

Bien de interés cultural in Garrigàs
Name of monument	BIC type	Type	Coordinates	BIC#	Date	Image
Castell d'Arenys	Monument	Castle	42.165835°N 2.953576°E	RI-51-0005912	8 November 1988	
Castell de Vilajoan	Monument	Castle	42.164718°N 2.934486°E	RI-51-0005913	8 November 1988	n/a

Garriguella

Bien de interés cultural in Garriguella
Name of monument	BIC type	Type	Coordinates	BIC#	Date	Image
Torre de la Mala Veïna	Monument	Tower	42.330957°N 3.036789°E	RI-51-0005914	8 November 1988	

=== L ===
L'Escala

Bien de interés cultural in L'Escala
Name of monument	BIC type	Type	Coordinates	BIC#	Date	Image
Alfolí de la Sala	Monument	Building	42.125911°N 3.133867°E	RI-51-0005085	20 July 1984	
Castell de Cinc-claus	Monument	Castle	42.137244°N 3.100884°E	RI-51-0005891	8 November 1988	
Cementiri Vell	Monument	Cemetery	42.121952°N 3.136325°E	RI-51-0005084	20 July 1984	
Museu Monogràfic; Convent de Santa Maria de Gràcia	Monument	Religious architecture Museum	42.135117°N 3.119813°E	RI-51-0001351	1 March 1962	
Torre de la Vila (Torre del Perxel)	Monument	Tower	42.12674°N 3.1284°E	RI-51-0005888	8 November 1988	
Torres de los Corts (Feliú y Noguera)	Monument	Tower	42.124832°N 3.113914°E	RI-51-0005890	8 November 1988	
Torre de Montgó	Monument	Tower	42.110794°N 3.17413°E	RI-51-0005887	8 November 1988	
Torre del Pedró	Monument	Tower	42.126786°N 3.127929°E	RI-51-0005889	8 November 1988	
Ruïnes d'Empúries	Archaeological zone	Greek and Roman ruins	42.134722°N 3.120556°E	RI-55-0000023	3 June 1931	
Empúries	Historic site	n/a	42.134722°N 3.120556°E	RI-54-0000042-00012	15 September 1972	
Sant Martí d'Empúries urban center	Historic group	n/a	42.139856°N 3.118140°E	RI-53-0000490	6 February 1996	

=== P ===
Palau de Santa Eulàlia

Bien de interés cultural in Palau de Santa Eulàlia
Name of monument	BIC type	Type	Coordinates	BIC#	Date	Image
Castell de Palau Sardiaca	Monument	Castle	42.177522°N 2.96932°E	RI-51-0003237	21 February 1989	

Palau-saverdera

Bien de interés cultural in Palau-saverdera
Name of monument	BIC type	Type	Coordinates	BIC#	Date	Image
Mas de la Torre	Monument	Tower	42.280348°N 3.133164°E	RI-51-0005999	8 November 1988	
Torre de les Hores	Monument	Tower	42.307764°N 3.149903°E	RI-51-0005997	8 November 1988	
Torre del Vent	Monument	Tower	42.291901°N 3.133351°E	RI-51-0005998	8 November 1988	

Pau

Bien de interés cultural in Pau
Name of monument	BIC type	Type	Coordinates	BIC#	Date	Image
Cal Marquès	Monument	Castle	42.315669°N 3.116549°E	RI-51-0005999	8 November 1988	n/a
Castell de Vilaüt	Monument	Castle	42.298562°N 3.114432°E	RI-51-0006017	8 November 1988	

Pedret i Marzà

Bien de interés cultural in Pedret i Marzà
Name of monument	BIC type	Type	Coordinates	BIC#	Date	Image
Castell de Marzà	Monument	Castle	42.311399°N 3.066753°E	RI-51-0006018	8 November 1988	
Recinte medieval de Marzà	Monument	Castle	42.310758°N 3.067464°E	RI-51-0006019	8 November 1988	n/a

Peralada

Bien de interés cultural in Peralada
Name of monument	BIC type	Type	Coordinates	BIC#	Date	Image
Castell de Peralada	Monument	Castle	42.307755°N 3.011141°E	RI-51-0006023	8 November 1988	
Castell de Vallgornera	Monument	Castle	42.305552°N 3.034124°E	RI-51-0006025	8 November 1988	
Mas de les Torres	Monument	Castle	42.281407°N 3.043835°E	RI-51-0006027	8 November 1988	
Monastir de Sant Domènech	Monument	Monastery	42.30719°N 3.008338°E	RI-51-0000575	3 June 1931	
Recinte emmurallat de Peralada	Monument	Wall	42.30915°N 3.007362°E	RI-51-0006024	8 November 1988	
Recinte medieval de Vilanova	Monument	Wall	42.279584°N 3.042598°E	RI-51-0006026	8 November 1988	

=== R ===
Rabós

Bien de interés cultural in Rabós
Name of monument	BIC type	Type	Location	Coordinates	BIC#	Date	Image
Monestir de San Quirze de Colera	Monument	Monastery	Rabós	42.416233°N 3.058889°E	RI-51-0000562	3 June 1931	

Roses

Bien de interés cultural in Roses
Name of monument	BIC type	Type	Location	Coordinates	BIC#	Date	Image
Casa Rozes	Monument	Building	Roses	42.237831°N 3.208104°E	RI-51-0007009	14 December 1992	
Castell de Bufalaranya	Monument	Castle	Roses	42.295326°N 3.194454°E	RI-51-0006056	8 November 1988	
Castell de la Garriga	Monument	Castle	Roses	42.279493°N 3.153592°E	RI-51-0006058	8 November 1988	
Castell de la Trinitat	Monument	Castle	Roses	42.247348°N 3.183786°E	RI-51-0006055	8 November 1988	
Castell de Puigrom	Monument	Castle	Roses	n/a	RI-51-0006057	8 November 1988	n/a
Torre de Can Figa	Monument	Tower	Roses	42.273001°N 3.234666°E	RI-51-0006062	8 November 1988	
Torre de Montjoi de Baix	Monument	Tower	Roses	n/a	RI-51-0006060	8 November 1988	n/a
Torre del Sastre	Monument	Tower	Roses	42.246876°N 3.215354°E	RI-51-0006059	8 November 1988	
Torre Norfeu	Monument	Tower	Roses	<n/a	RI-51-0006061	8 November 1988	n/a
Sepulcre megalític de la Creu de Cobertella	Archaeological zone	Sepulchre	Roses	n/a	RI-55-0000527	9 April 1964	n/a
Poblat visigótic de Puig Rom	Archaeological zone	Settlement	Roses	42.25621°N 3.18905°E	RI-55-0000075	9 April 1964	n/a
Cala Joncola, Cap de Norfeu Mont Pei y Cala Nans	Historic site	n/a	Roses	n/a	RI-54-0000042-00014	8 November 1988	n/a
Ruines del Monestir, la Ciutadella y terrenys circundants	Historical group	n/a	Roses	42.266944°N 3.17°E	RI-53-0000029	23 February 1961	

=== S ===
Sant Llorenç de la Muga

Bien de interés cultural in Sant Llorenç de la Muga
Name of monument	BIC type	Type	Location	Coordinates	BIC#	Date	Image
Castell de Sant Llorenç	Monument	Castle	Sant Llorenç de la Muga	42.319951°N 2.785763°E	RI-51-0006092	8 November 1988	
Recinte fortificat de Sant Llorenç de la Muga	Monument	Wall	Sant Llorenç de la Muga	42.319539°N 2.787665°E	RI-51-0006093	8 November 1988	
Torre de Guaita	Monument	Tower	Sant Llorenç de la Muga	42.31773°N 2.790353°E	RI-51-0006094	8 November 1988	

Sant Miquel de Fluvià

Bien de interés cultural in Sant Miquel de Fluvià
Name of monument	BIC type	Type	Location	Coordinates	BIC#	Date	Image
Església de Sant Miquel de Fluviá	Monument	Church	Sant Miquel de Fluvià	42.171808°N 2.991732°W	RI-51-0000563	3 June 1931	

Sant Mori

Bien de interés cultural in Sant Mori
Name of monument	BIC type	Type	Location	Coordinates	BIC#	Date	Image
Castell de Sant Mori	Monument	Castle	Sant Mori	42.153946°N 2.990729°E	RI-51-0006102	8 November 1988	

Sant Pere Pescador

Bien de interés cultural in Sant Pere Pescador
Name of monument	BIC type	Type	Location	Coordinates	BIC#	Date	Image
Casa Caramany	Monument	Castle	Sant Pere Pescador	42.188519°N 3.081956°E	RI-51-0006103	8 November 1988	
Antigues muralles	Monument	Mural	Sant Pere Pescador	42.188657°N 3.08174°E	RI-51-0006104	8 November 1988	

Saus, Camallera i Llampaies

Bien de interés cultural in Saus, Camallera i Llampaies
Name of monument	BIC type	Type	Location	Coordinates	BIC#	Date	Image
Església de Santa Eugènia de Saus	Monument	Church	Saus	42.132393°N 2.978668°E	RI-51-0006109	8 November 1988	n/a
Església de Sant Martí de Llampaies	Monument	Church	Llampaies	42.121096°N 2.936686°E	RI-51-0006110	8 November 1988	

Siurana

Bien de interés cultural in Siurana
Name of monument	BIC type	Type	Location	Coordinates	BIC#	Date	Image
Castell de Siurana	Monument	Castle	Albanyà	42.209222°N 2.994647°E	RI-51-0006118	8 November 1988	

=== T ===
Terrades

Bien de interés cultural in Terrades
Name of monument	BIC type	Type	Location	Coordinates	BIC#	Date	Image
Castell de Palau-surroca	Defense architecture	Castle	Terradas	42.297893°N 2.871726°E	RI-51-0006122	8 November 1988	
Castell de Terrades	Monument	Defense architecture Castle	Terradas	n/a	RI-51-0006848	21 February 1989	

Torroella de Fluvià

Bien de interés cultural in Torroella de Fluvià
Name of monument	BIC type	Type	Location	Coordinates	BIC#	Date	Image
Recinte fortificat de Vilacolum	Monument	Wall	Torroella de Fluvià	42.194343°N 3.037152°E	RI-51-0006125	8 November 1988	
Torre de ca l'Albanyà	Monument	Tower	Torroella de Fluvià	42.174609°N 3.040556°E	RI-51-0006124	8 November 1988	

=== V ===
Ventalló

Bien de interés cultural in Ventalló
Name of monument	BIC type	Type	Location	Coordinates	BIC#	Date	Image
Cal Ferrer	Monument	n/a	Ventalló	42.164911°N 3.008548°E	RI-51-0005784	8 November 1988	n/a
Casa del Delme	Monument	n/a	Ventalló	42.148719°N 3.026957°E	RI-51-0006153	8 November 1988	n/a
Casa Perramon	Monument	Civil architecture	Ventalló	n/a	RI-51-0006157	8 November 1988	n/a
Castell de Pelacalç	Monument	Castle	Ventalló	42.145415°N 3.070915°E	RI-51-0006152	8 November 1988	n/a
Muralles de Ventalló	Monument	Wall	Ventalló	n/a	RI-51-0006154	8 November 1988	n/a
Palau dels Margarit	Monument	Civil architecture	Ventalló	42.154929°N 3.06976°E	RI-51-0006155	8 November 1988	n/a
Torres de Vila-robau	Monument	Tower	Ventalló	42.164911°N 3.008548°E	RI-51-0006156	8 November 1988	n/a

Vilabertran

Bien de interés cultural in Vilabertran
Name of monument	BIC type	Type	Location	Coordinates	BIC#	Date	Image
Monestir de Santa Maria de Vilabertran	Monument	Church	Vilabertran	42.28215°N 2.979046°E	RI-51-0000353	11 November 1930	
Palau de l'Abat y muralles	Monument	Palace	Vilabertran	n/a	RI-51-0006165	8 November 1988	

Viladamat

Bien de interés cultural in Viladamat
Name of monument	BIC type	Type	Location	Coordinates	BIC#	Date	Image
Castell de la Garriga	Monument	Castle	Viladamat	42.11933°N 3.053487°E	RI-51-0006167	8 November 1988	n/a
Porta y muralles de la Pabordia	Monument	Wall	Viladamat	42.133384°N 3.075486°E	RI-51-0006168	8 November 1988	

Vilafant

Bien de interés cultural in Vilafant
Name of monument	BIC type	Type	Location	Coordinates	BIC#	Date	Image
Castell de Palol Sabaldòria	Monument	Castle	Vilafant	42.243513°N 2.946208°E	RI-51-0006178	8 November 1988	

Vilajuïga

Bien de interés cultural in Vilajuïga
Name of monument	BIC type	Type	Location	Coordinates	BIC#	Date	Image
Castell de Miralles	Monument	Castle	Vilajuïga	42.342037°N 3.132155°E	RI-51-0006180	8 November 1988	n/a
Castell de Quermançó	Monument	Castle	Vilajuïga	42.339999°N 3.092077°E	RI-51-0006179	8 November 1988	

Vilamacolum

Bien de interés cultural in Vilamacolum
Name of monument	BIC type	Type	Location	Coordinates	BIC#	Date	Image
Torre i església fortificada de Vilamacolum	Monument	Church	Vilamacolum	42.195013°N 3.058322°E	RI-51-0006184	8 November 1988	

Vilamalla

Bien de interés cultural in Vilamalla
Name of monument	BIC type	Type	Location	Coordinates	BIC#	Date	Image
L'Abadia	Monument	Civil architecture	Vilamalla	42.218334°N 2.969613°E	RI-51-0006185	8 November 1988	n/a

Vilamaniscle

Bien de interés cultural in Vilamaniscle
Name of monument	BIC type	Type	Location	Coordinates	BIC#	Date	Image
Torre de l'església	Monument	Civil architecture	Vilamaniscle	42.375533°N 3.067076°E	RI-51-0006186	8 November 1988	

Vilanant

Bien de interés cultural in Vilanant
Name of monument	BIC type	Type	Location	Coordinates	BIC#	Date	Image
Casal fortificat junt a l'eglésia	Monument	Wall	Vilanant	42.254989°N 2.889055°E	RI-51-0006187	8 November 1988	
Castell dels Moros	Monument	Castle	Vilanant	42.248576°N 2.865814°E	RI-51-0006188	8 November 1988	
Sant Salvador de Coquells	Monument	Wall	Vilanant	42.274257°N 2.867386°E	RI-51-0006189	8 November 1988	n/a

Vilasacra (Vila-sacra)

Bien de interés cultural in Agullana
Name of monument	BIC type	Type	Location	Coordinates	BIC#	Date	Image
Castell de Vila-sacra	Monument	Castle	Vilasacra	42.266086°N 3.017992°E	RI-51-0006190	8 November 1988	
Església fortificada de Sant Esteve	Monument	Church	Vilasacra	42.266115°N 3.018287°E	RI-51-0006191	8 November 1988	

Vilaür

Bien de interés cultural in Vilaür
Name of monument	BIC type	Type	Location	Coordinates	BIC#	Date	Image
Recinte emmurallat de Vilaür	Monument	Wall	Vilaür	42.143637°N 2.955247°E	RI-51-0006192	8 November 1988	
