= Alegre =

Alegre may refer to:

- Alegre (surname)
- Alegre Records, a Latin music record label
- Alegre, Espírito Santo, Brazil, a municipality
- Alegre River (disambiguation), multiple rivers

== See also ==
- Porto Alegre (disambiguation)
- Allègre (disambiguation)
