= Sant Mori =

- Municipality
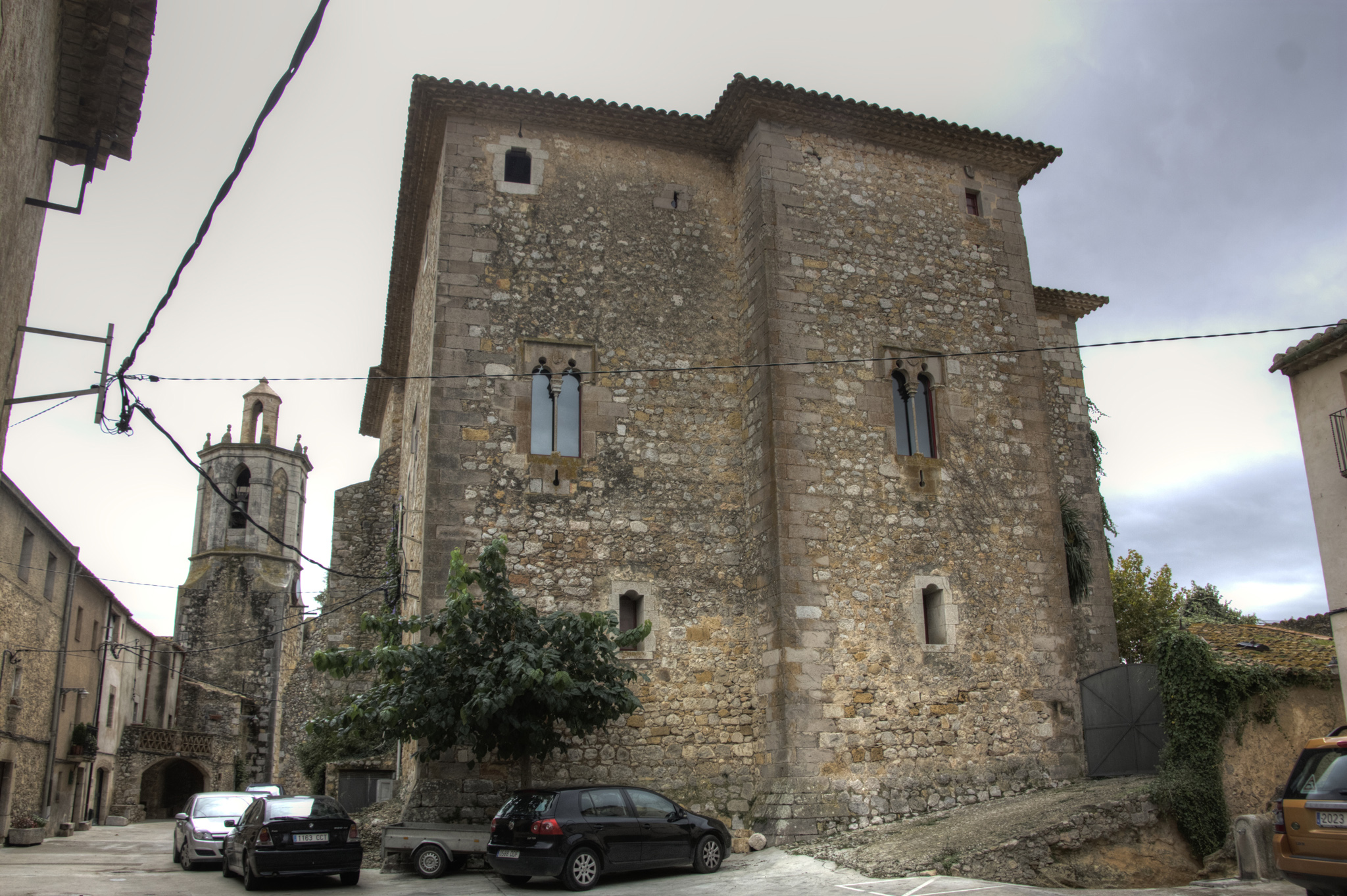
- Castle of Sant Mori

- Flag Coat of arms

- Location in Catalonia Sant Mori (Spain)
- Coordinates: 42°09′N 2°59′E
- Country: Spain
- Community: Catalonia
- Province: Girona
- Comarca: Alt Empordà

Government
  - Mayor: Modesta Cucurull Nadal (2015)

Area
  - Total: 7.5 km^{2} (2.9 sq mi)
- Elevation: 51 m (167 ft)

Population (2025-01-01)
  - Total: 163
  - Density: 22/km^{2} (56/sq mi)
- Demonym: santmorienc / santmorienca
- Website: www.santmori.cat

Sant Mori (Catalan pronunciation: [ˈsam ˈmɔɾi]) is a municipality in the comarca of Alt Empordà, Girona, Catalonia, Spain.

Situated on the right bank of the river Fluvià, it is limited on the north by Sant Miquel de Fluvià, on the east by Ventalló, on the south by Saus and on the west by Palau de Santa Eulàlia.

The economy is primarily based on agriculture, animal husbandry, and, more recently, tourism.

Sant Mori was a barony in the 15th century and in 1893 it became a marquisate. The regent queen Juana Enríquez and her son Ferdinand II of Aragon spent some days in the castle of Sant Mori at the height of the war against John II of Aragon. There the Parliament of the Corts Catalanes was invoked in October, 1466.

== Places of interest ==
- Saint Mauricio's Church. 18th century
- Sant Julià's Church. Pre-Romanic style
- Sant Mori Castle, Which is more similar to a palace than to a fortification, and is built on top of older ruins. www.castellsantmori.com/
- Archeological site of an Iberian village.
