= Alegre (surname) =

Alegre is a Spanish surname. Notable people with the surname include:

- Alibel Alegre (born 1983), Spanish figure skater
- Alona Alegre (1948–2018), Filipino actress (Stage name)
- David Alegre (born 1984), Spanish field hockey player
- Derlis Alegre (born 1994), Paraguayan footballer
- Diego Alegre (born 1982), Spanish footballer
- Efraín Alegre (born 1963), Paraguayan politician
- Emma Alegre (born 1933), Filipino actress
- Esteban Alegre (c. 1550–1620), Spanish Creole landowner and conquistador
- Johnny Alegre (born 1955), Filipino jazz musician
- Juan B. Alegre (1882–1931), Philippine senator
- Manuel Alegre (born 1936), Portuguese poet and politician
- Mauricio Alegre (born 1975), Mexican footballer
- Mauro Alegre (born 1988), Argentine footballer
- Milton Alegre (born 1991), Argentine footballer
- Narciso Alegre (c. 1800s), Spanish general
- Narciso Alegre Pellicer (1866-?), Carlist exile to the Philippines
- Narciso J. Alegre (1911–1980), Filipino civil liberties advocate
- Norberto Costa Alegre (born 1951), Prime Minister of São Tomé and Príncipe
- Oscar Alegre (born 1983), Argentine footballer
- Pedro Alegre (born 1961), Spanish sprint canoeist
- Ramón Alegre (born 1981), Spanish field hockey player
- Ricardo Alegre (born 1959), Mexican politician
