= Carles Fages de Climent =

Spanish writer, poet and journalist

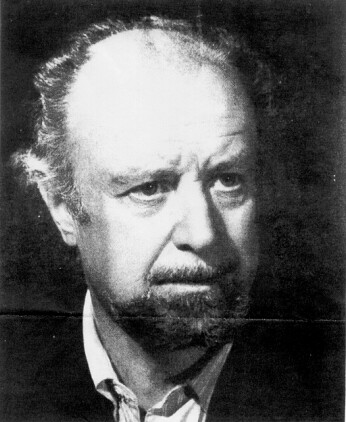

Carles Fages de Climent (1902 in Figueres – 1968) was a writer, poet and journalist from the Empordà, a historical region of Catalonia, Spain. He was born in Figueres on May 16, 1902. In Figueres' high school, he met Salvador Dalí, starting a friendship that would last all their lives.

Fages de Climent contributed to the literary mythification of his native region, taking the Empordà, the northern wind, the tramuntana and its people as a thematic basis of a multiple literary production (poetry, prose, theater and journalism). Thus, he created literary characters like the Cobbler of Ordis – comparable, according to Eugenio d'Ors to Don Quixote of Cervantes. He also contributed in a decisive way to conferring determinate attributions to certain villages of the Empordà like (Llers, land of witches; or Vila-sacra, capital of the world).

== Fages and Dalí ==
He collaborated several times with his friend and schoolmate Salvador Dalí, who, in 1924, being still almost unknown painter, illustrated a book for the first time. It was Fages' poem, in Catalan language Les bruixes de Llers (The Witches of Llers). He illustrated as well another book of Fages de Climent, La balada del Sabater d'Ordis (The Balad of the Cobbler of Ordis) (1954), writing also the epilogue. They finally worked together at the occasion of the homage that the city of Figueres paid, in 1961, to Salvador Dalí. They made an auca – a series of pictures with captions in rhyming couplets which tell a story – entitled in Catalan language El triomf i el rodolí de la Gala i en Dalí (The triumph and the couplet of Gala and Dalí). Fages put the verses and Dalí the drawings. The text is a poetic biography of the painter and the ilustracions provide a brilliant synthesis of all the Dalinian symbology. Thus, the soft watches, the ants, the Angelus of Millet, the shoemaker of Ordis, and some of the main Dalinian referents, like Picasso or Gaudí.

It is also worth mentioning Dalí's paintwork "Christ of the Tramontana", held in the Dalí Theatre and Museum – carried out by Salvador Dalí in homage to Fages de Climent on the occasion of his death, and that makes allusion to one of the most popular verses of Fages de Climent, "The Prayer to the Christ of the Tramuntana".
