= Torroella =

Torroella may refer to:

- Torroella de Fluvià, municipality in the comarca of Alt Empordà
- Torroella de Montgrí, municipality in the comarca of Baix Empordà
