= Convent of Santo Domingo =

Convent of Santo Domingo may refer to:

- Santo Domingo Convent, a convent in Argentina
- Convento de Santo Domingo, Cartagena, a convent in Colombia
- Convent of Santo Domingo, Cusco, a convent in Peru
- Basilica and Convent of Santo Domingo, a convent in Lima, Peru
- Convent of Santo Domingo (Girona) or Convent de Sant Domènec de Girona, a convent in Spain
- Convent of Santo Domingo (Valencia), a convent in Spain
