= Miguel Sierra Zúñiga =

Mexican politician

- Born: Querétaro, Mexico
- Occupation: Politician
- Political party: PAN

Miguel Sierra Zúñiga is a Mexican politician affiliated with the National Action Party (PAN). In 2003–2006 he served as a federal deputy in the 59th Congress, representing Querétaro's fourth district, as Ricardo Alegre's substitute.
