= Allègre (disambiguation) =

Allègre is a commune in France.

Allègre or Allegre may refer to:

== People ==
- Claude Allègre (1937–2025), French politician and scientist
- Luis Alegre (c. 1510–1570s), Flemish soldier in the service of the Spanish Crown
- Nils Allègre (born 1994), French World Cup alpine ski racer
- Raul Allegre (born 1959), American National Football League player
- Vincent Allègre (1835–1899), French lawyer and politician

== Other uses ==
- Allegre, Kentucky, United States, an unincorporated community

== See also ==
- Allègre-les-Fumades, a commune in the Gard department in southern France
- Alegre (disambiguation)
- Allegri, an Italian surname
