= 4th federal electoral district of Querétaro =

Federal electoral district of Mexico

Querétaro's 4th
- Electoral district of the Chamber of Deputies of Mexico

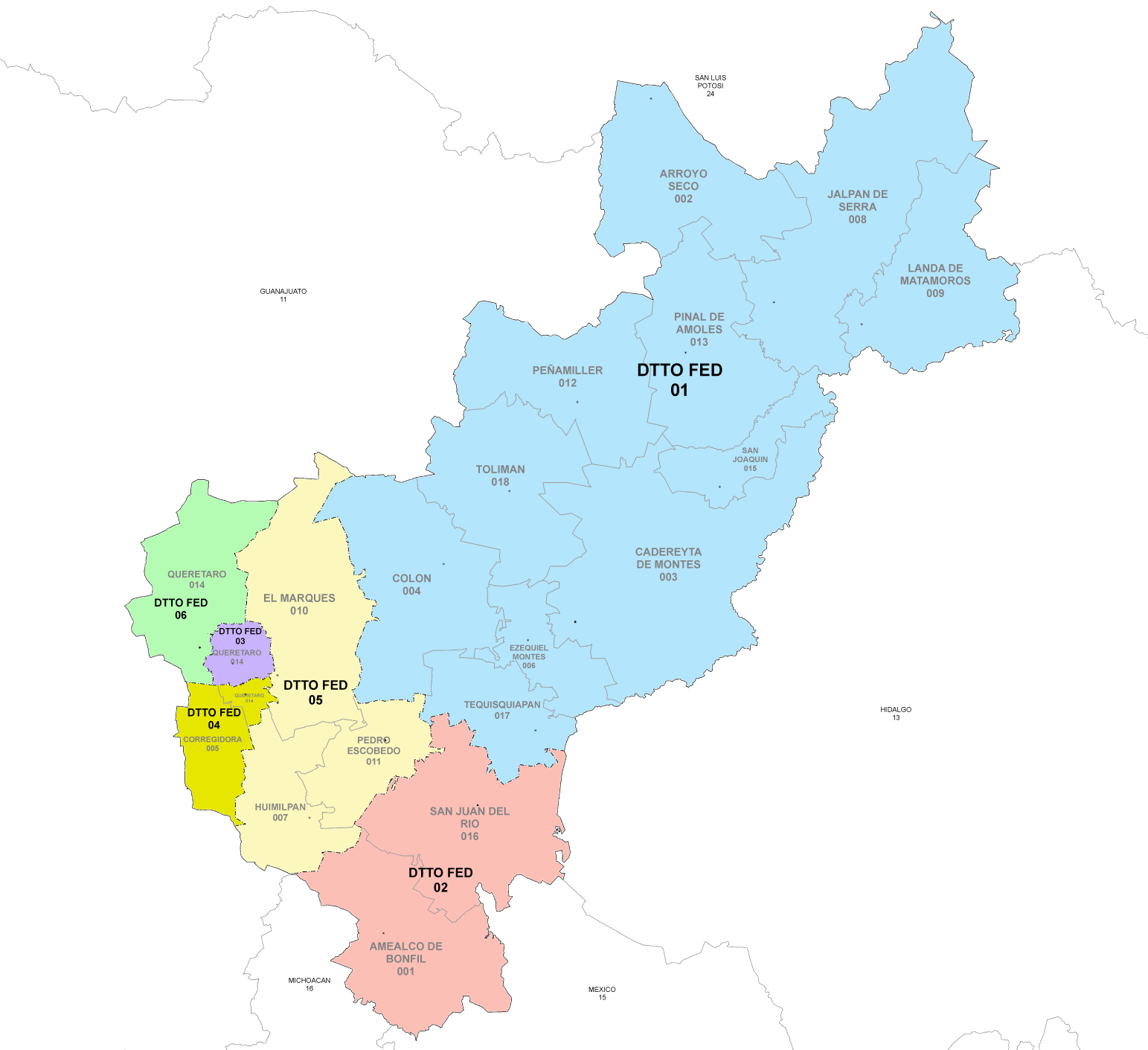
- 4th district since 2023

Incumbent
- Member: Roberto Sosa Pichardo
- Party: ▌National Action Party
- Congress: 66th (2024–2027)

District
- State: Querétaro
- Head town: Santiago de Querétaro
- Coordinates: 20°35′N 100°23′W
- Covers: Querétaro (part), Corregidora
- PR region: Fifth
- Precincts: 176
- Population: 417,997 (2020 census)

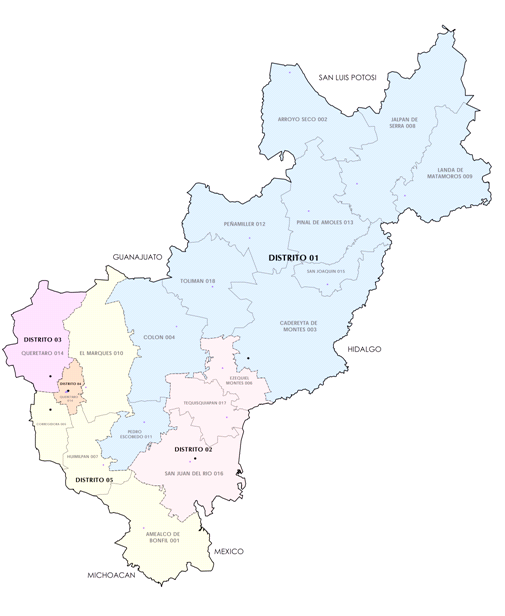
Querétaro under the 2017–2022 districting plan

The 4th federal electoral district of Querétaro (Spanish: Distrito electoral federal 04 de Querétaro) is one of the 300 electoral districts into which Mexico is divided for elections to the federal Chamber of Deputies and one of six such districts in the state of Querétaro.

It returns one deputy to the lower house of Congress for each three-year legislative session by means of the first-past-the-post system. Votes cast in the district also count towards the calculation of proportional representation ("plurinominal") deputies; since 2024, those elected from the fifth region.

Suspended in 1930, (Note: An amendment to Article 52 of the Constitution in 1928 changed the original provision of "one deputy per 60,000 inhabitants" to "one deputy per 100,000"; as a result, the size of the Chamber of Deputies fell from 281 in the 1928 election to 171 in 1934.) the 4th district was re-established by the Federal Electoral Institute (IFE) as part of the 1996 districting process and, as such, has returned deputies to Congress since the 1997 mid-terms.

The current member for the district, elected in the 2024 general election, is Roberto Sosa Pichardo of the National Action Party (PAN).

== District territory ==
Under the 2023 districting plan adopted by the National Electoral Institute (INE), which assigned Querétaro an additional seat in Congress and is to be used for the 2024, 2027 and 2030 federal elections, the 4th district covers 176 precincts (secciones electorales) across the municipality of Corregidora and a portion of the municipality of Querétaro.

The head town (cabecera distrital), where results from individual polling stations are gathered together and tallied, is the state capital, Santiago de Querétaro. The district reported a population of 417,997 in the 2020 census.

== Previous districting schemes ==
Evolution of electoral district numbers
| | 1974 | 1978 | 1996 | 2005 | 2017 | 2023 |
|---|---|---|---|---|---|---|
| Querétaro | 2 | 3 | 4 | 4 | 5 | 6 |
| Chamber of Deputies | 196 | 300 | | | | |

2017–2022

Between 2017 and 2022, when the state contained five federal electoral districts, the 4th covered a portion of the municipality of Querétaro.

2005–2017

Under the 2005 plan, Querétaro had four districts. The 4th district's head town was the state capital and it covered 130 precincts in the municipality of Querétaro and the whole (28 precincts) of El Marqués.

1996–2005

In the 1996 scheme, the newly restored 4th district comprised the southern part of the municipality of Querétaro, including the southern portion of the city.

== Deputies returned to Congress ==
(Mexico) National parties
- Current
- PAN
- PRI
- PT
- PVEM
- MC
- Morena
- PAZ
- Somos
- Defunct or local only
- PLM
- PNR
- PRM
- PNM
- PP
- PPS
- PARM
- PFCRN
- CON
- PANAL
- PSD
- PES
- PES
- PRD

Querétaro's 4th district
| Election | Deputy | Party | Term | Legislature |
|---|---|---|---|---|
| 1922 | José Siurob Ramírez | | 1922–1924 | 30th Congress |
...
The 4th district was suspended between 1930 and 1996
| 1997 | Felipe Urbiola Ledesma | National Action Party (Mexico) | 1997–2000 | 57th Congress |
| 2000 | José Ramón Soto Reséndiz | National Action Party (Mexico) | 2000–2003 | 58th Congress |
| 2003 | Miguel Sierra Zúñiga | National Action Party (Mexico) | 2003–2006 | 59th Congress |
| 2006 | Alejandro Delgado Oscoy | National Action Party (Mexico) | 2006–2009 | 60th Congress |
| 2009 | Reginaldo Rivera de la Torre | Institutional Revolutionary Party | 2009–2012 | 61st Congress |
| 2012 | José Guadalupe García Ramírez | National Action Party (Mexico) | 2012–2015 | 62nd Congress |
| 2009 | J. Apolinar Casillas Gutiérrez | National Action Party (Mexico) | 2009–2012 | 63rd Congress |
| 2018 | Felipe Fernando Macías Olvera | National Action Party (Mexico) | 2018–2021 | 64th Congress |
| 2021 | Felipe Fernando Macías Olvera | National Action Party (Mexico) | 2021–2024 | 65th Congress |
| 2024 | Roberto Sosa Pichardo | National Action Party (Mexico) | 2024–2027 | 66th Congress |

== Presidential elections ==
Querétaro's 4th district
| Election | District won by | Party or coalition | % |
|---|---|---|---|
| 2018 | Andrés Manuel López Obrador | Juntos Haremos Historia | 39.6579 |
| 2024 | Bertha Xóchitl Gálvez Ruiz | Fuerza y Corazón por México | 50.6735 |
