= Alejandro Delgado Oscoy =

Mexican politician (born 1971)

- Born: 26 May 1971 (age 55); Querétaro, Mexico
- Education: Querétaro University of Technology
- Occupation: Politician
- Political party: PAN

Alejandro Enrique Delgado Oscoy (born 26 May 1971) is a Mexican politician from the National Action Party (PAN). From 2006 to 2009 he served as a federal deputy in the 60th Congress, representing Querétaro's fourth district; he had previously served in the Congress of Querétaro from 2003 to 2006.
