= Portalegre =

Portalegre may refer to:

== Brazil ==
- Portalegre, Rio Grande do Norte, a municipality in the state of Rio Grande do Norte in the Northeast region of Brazil.

== Portugal ==
- Portalegre District, a district in Portugal
  - Portalegre, Portugal, a municipality in the district of Portalegre
    - Castle of Portalegre, a medieval castle in the civil parish of Sé e São Lourenço, municipality of Portalegre
- Portalegre Football Association, a district governing body for the all football competitions in the Portuguese district of Portalegre.
- Portalegre wine, a Portuguese wine region centered on the Portalegre.
- Count of Portalegre, was a Portuguese title of nobility.

== See also ==
- Porto Alegre (disambiguation)
