= Church of Sant Tomàs de Fluvià =

Church in Torroella de Fluvià, Spain

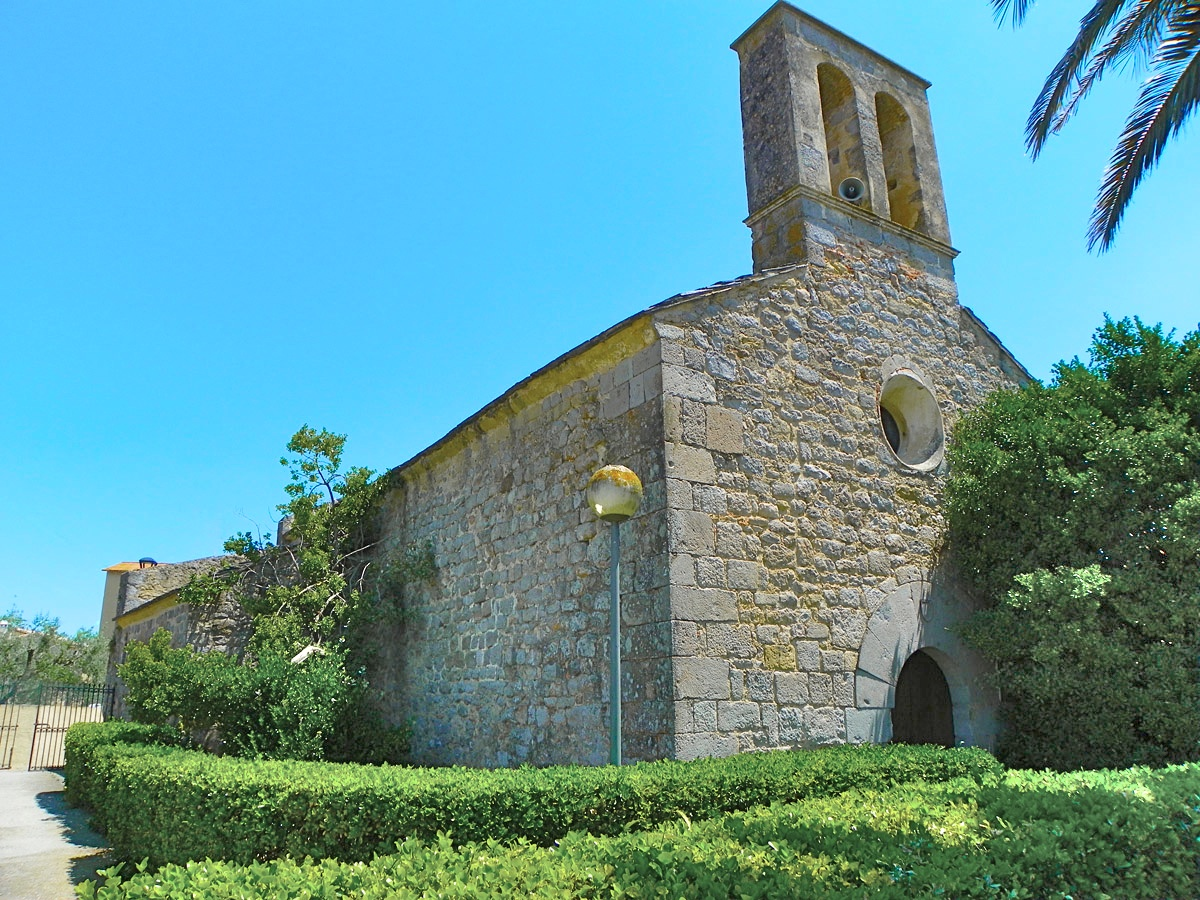
Sant Tomàs de Fluvià

The Església de Sant Tomàs de Fluvià is an 11th Century monastic church in Torroella de Fluvià, named after the river Fluvià.
