= Vilacolum =

Coordinates: 42°11′39.53″N 3°2′10.84″E

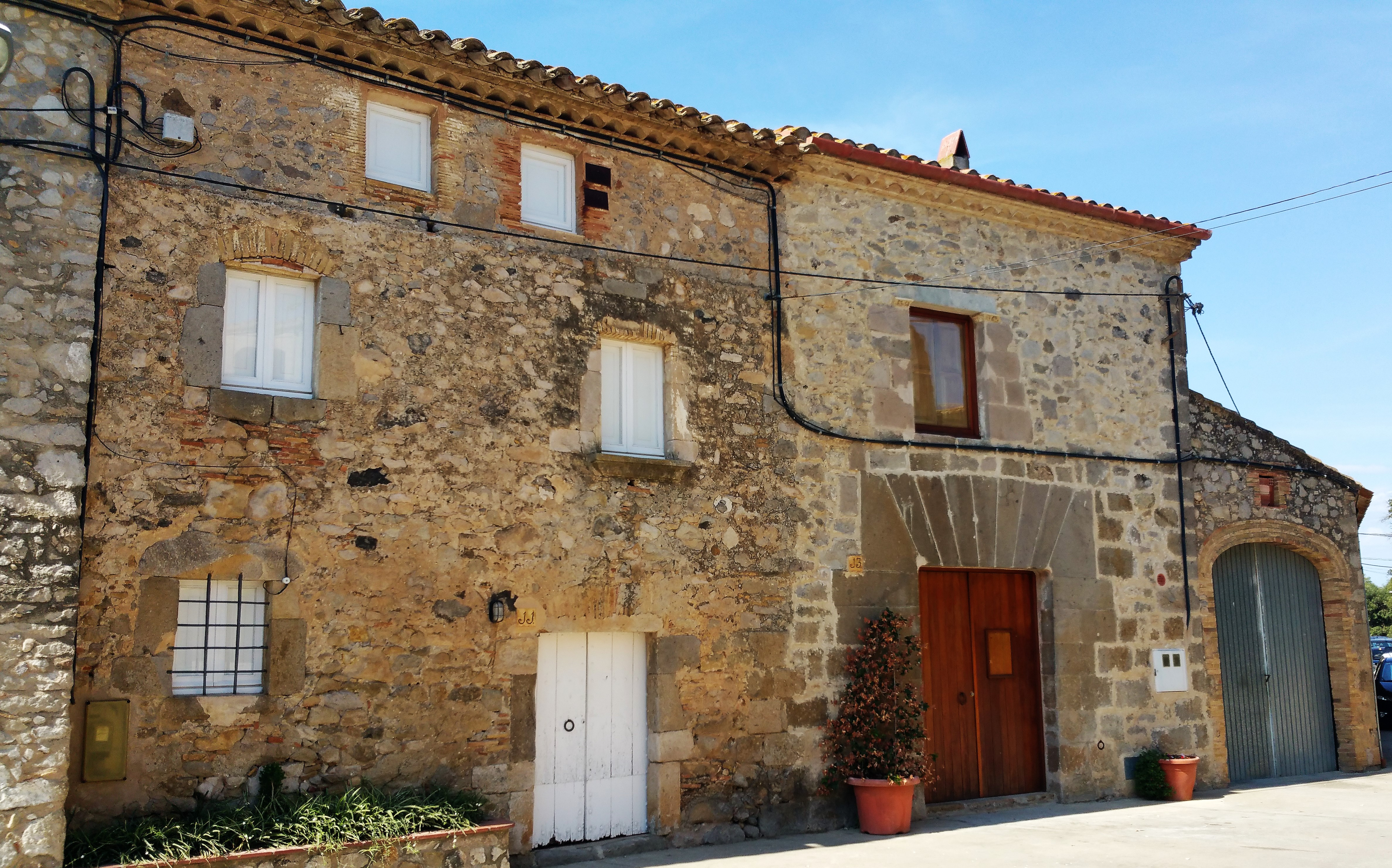
Rectory of Vilacolum

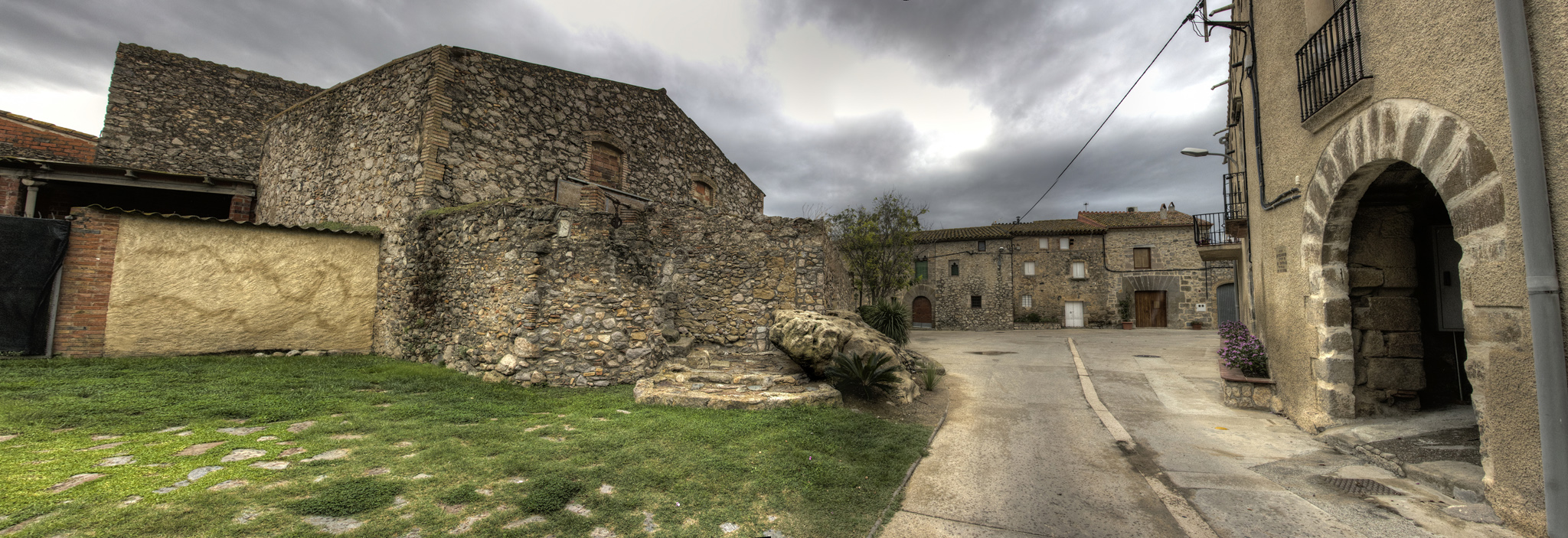
Fortified enclosure of Vilacolum

Vilacolum (Catalan pronunciation: [ˌbiləkuˈlum]) is a village in the municipality of Torroella de Fluvià, 10 km south-east of Figueres in Alt Empordà, Catalonia.
