= José Guadalupe García Ramírez =

Mexican politician

- Born: 12 September 1968 (age 57); Querétaro, Querétaro, Mexico
- Occupation: Deputy
- Political party: PAN

José Guadalupe García Ramírez (born 9 December 1968) is a Mexican politician affiliated with the National Action Party (PAN). In 2012–2015 he served as a federal deputy in the 62nd Congress, representing Querétaro's fourth district.
