= Convent de Sant Domènec de Girona =

Monastery in Girona, Spain

Coordinates: 41.985586°N 2.827933°E

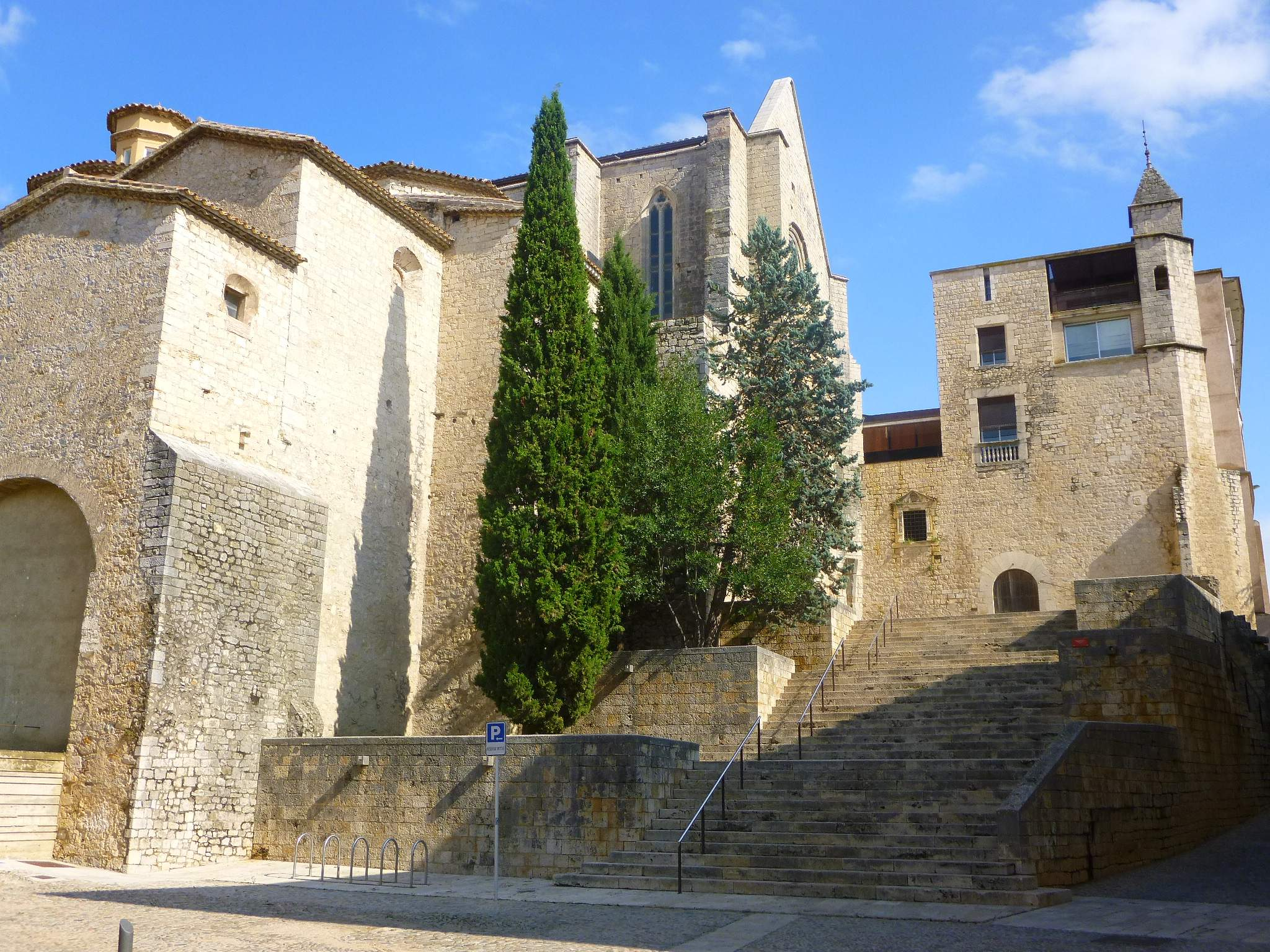
Convent de Sant Domènec

Convent de Sant Domènec de Girona was founded in 1253 in the city of Girona by Berenguer de Castellbisbal of the Dominican Order. It is a Bienes de Interés Cultural landmark.

== See also ==
- List of Bienes de Interés Cultural in the Province of Girona
