= Esteban Alegre =

Esteban de Alegre

Personal details
- Born: c. 1550 Asunción, Paraguay
- Died: c. 1620 Corrientes, Argentina
- Occupation: Encomendero landowner explorer

Military service
- Allegiance: Spanish Empire
- Rank: Conquistador
- Commands: Milicias Provinciales

Esteban Alegre (c. 1550 – c. 1620) was a Spanish Creole landowner and conquistador. He was one of the neighbors founders of Buenos Aires and Corrientes.

== Biography ==
He was born in Asunción, and arrived in Buenos Aires as a member of the contingent led by Juan de Garay, for the second foundation of the city in 1580.

The same year of the foundation, Esteban Alegre received 3000 varas of land located on the border of Riachuelo, (La Matanza). In 1582, he received encomienda of the tribe Alacas (of Guaraní origen) commanded by the cacique Suguna.

Esteban Alegre was married to Isabel de Pantoja, daughter of Isabel Pantoja and Esteban de Vallejos, a Spanish conquistador born in Somorrostro, and who served as captain and regidor of Santa Fe for 1590s. His ancestors were Luis Alegre and Dionis de Lys, conquerors from Flanders.
