= The Cobbler of Ordis =

The Cobbler of Ordis ("el sabater d'Ordis" in the Catalan language) is a literary character created by the Catalan poet Carles Fages de Climent, who in 1954 published The ballad of the Cobbler of Ordis, a book of poems with a prologue by the Catalan writer and philosopher Eugenio d'Ors, and illustrated – including an epilogue – by Salvador Dalí, a former classmate and close friend of the author. The character, who Eugenio d'Ors compared with Don Quixote, used to walk through the dusty paths and alleys of the Catalan county of Ampurdan, while directing the tramuntana, the north wind, with a cane.
