= Eduardo de la Torre Jaramillo =

Mexican politician

- Born: 27 February 1968 (age 58); Xalapa, Veracruz, Mexico
- Occupation: Politician
- Political party: PASD (2003–2007); PAN (2007–present)

Eduardo Sergio de la Torre Jaramillo (born 27 February 1968) is a Mexican politician from the National Action Party (formerly from the Social Democratic Party). From 2006 to 2009 he served as Deputy of the LX Legislature of the Mexican Congress representing Veracruz.
