= Torrecilla de la Torre =

Coordinates: 41°40′N 5°02′W

Torrecilla de la Torre, Spain
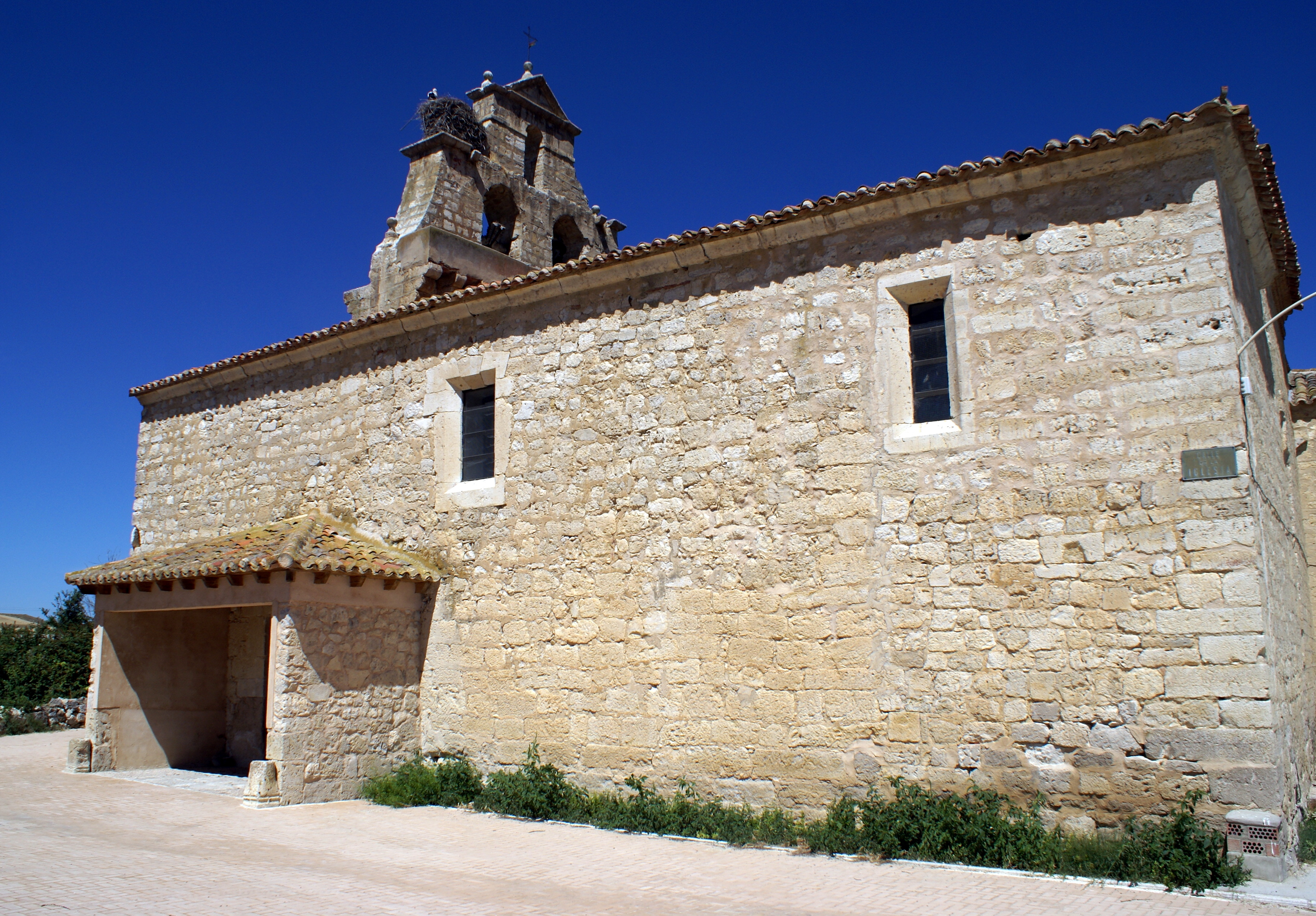
- Church
- Country: Spain
- Autonomous community: Castile and León
- Province: Valladolid
- Municipality: Torrecilla de la Torre

Area
  - Total: 7 km^{2} (2.7 sq mi)

Population (2025-01-01)
  - Total: 27
  - Density: 3.9/km^{2} (10/sq mi)
- Time zone: UTC+1 (CET)
  - Summer (DST): UTC+2 (CEST)

Torrecilla de la Torre is a municipality located in the province of Valladolid, Castile and León, Spain. According to the 2004 census (INE), the municipality has a population of 31 inhabitants.
