= Luis Alegre =

Flemish soldier and Spanish expeditionary

Conquistador Luis de Alegre

Expedicionario at the service of the Spanish Empire
- Monarchs: Charles V Philip II

Personal details
- Born: Louis Plesier c. 1510 Flanders, Habsburg Netherlands
- Died: 1573 Asunción, Viceroyalty of Peru
- Occupation: Conqueror, explorer, encomendero
- Profession: Artilleryman, sailor

Military service
- Allegiance: Spanish Empire
- Branch/service: Spanish Navy
- Years of service: 1530 – c. 1570

Luis Alegre (c. 1510 – 1573) was a Flemish soldier of the Spanish monarchy, who was a conquistador and expeditionary of the Río de la Plata and Paraguay.

== Biography ==
He arrived at the Río de la Plata in the expedition of Pedro de Mendoza in 1534, and later to Asunción, aboard the ship "La Marañona" in 1538. He changed his original last name "Plesier" to Alegre, and attended the election of Domingo Martinez de Irala as Lieutenant Governor of Paraguay in 1539. He had an active participation in the Conquest of Paraguay, receiving parcels of land, in addition to the distributions of various indigenous tribes as encomiendas for their services to the Crown.

His first wife was Magdalena Testanova, daughter of Blas Testanova, the first doctor of the Río de la Plata. His second was Catalina Lys, daughter of Flemish conquistador Dionis de Lys, with whom he had a son, Esteban Alegre.
