= Reginaldo Rivera de la Torre =

Mexican politician

- Born: 10 April 1960 (age 66); Querétaro, Mexico
- Occupation: Politician
- Political party: PRI

Reginaldo Rivera de la Torre (born 10 April 1960) is a Mexican politician from the Institutional Revolutionary Party (PRI). From 2009 to 2012 he served as a federal deputy in the 61st Congress, representing Querétaro's fourth district.
