= Vilajuïga =

- Municipality
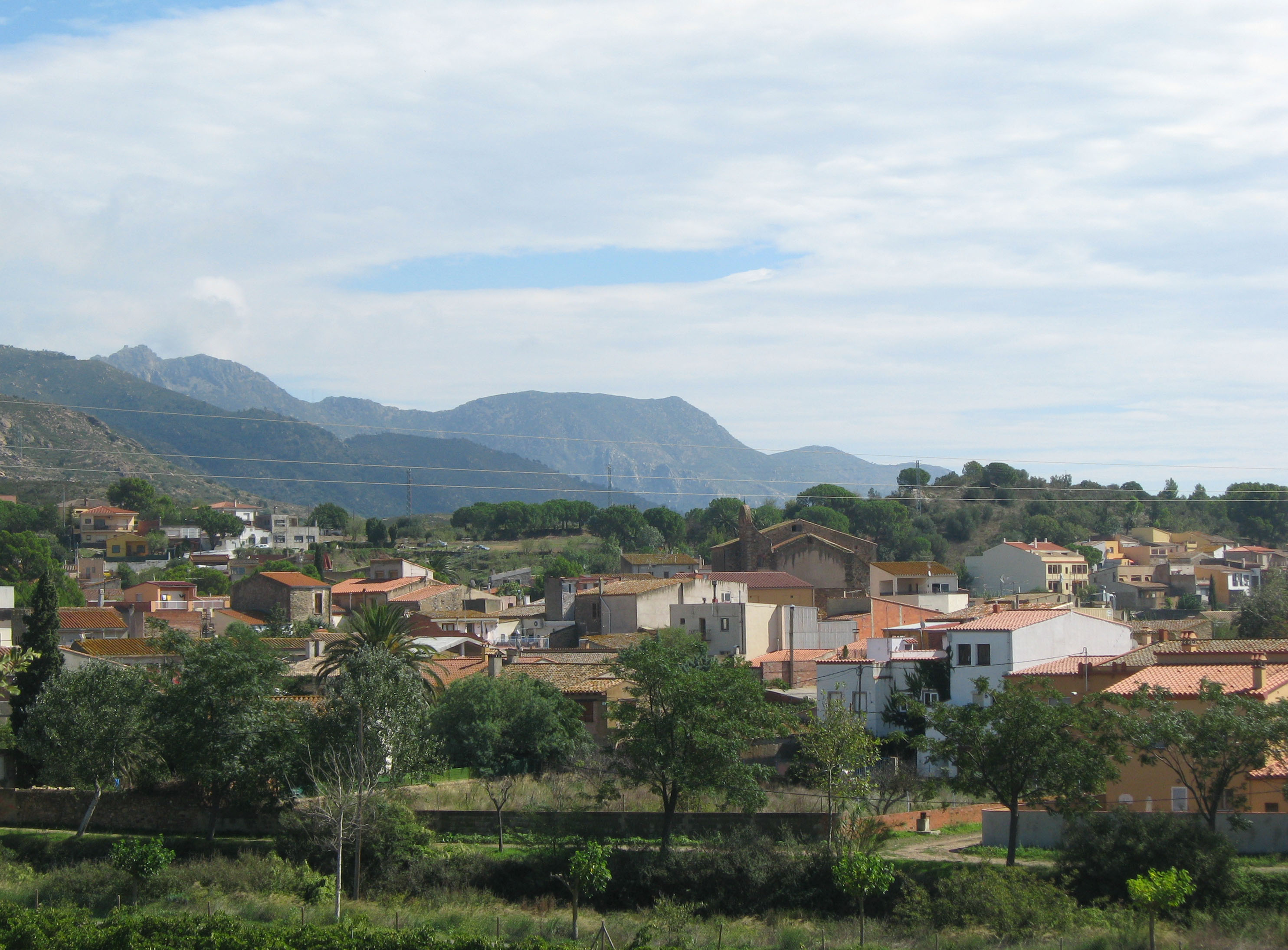

- Flag Coat of arms

- Location in Catalonia Vilajuïga (Spain)
- Coordinates: 42°19′41″N 3°5′43″E
- Country: Spain
- Community: Catalonia
- Province: Girona
- Comarca: Alt Empordà

Government
  - Mayor: Joana Cobo Ortiz (2015)

Area
  - Total: 13.1 km^{2} (5.1 sq mi)
- Elevation: 31 m (102 ft)

Population (2025-01-01)
  - Total: 1,177
  - Density: 89.8/km^{2} (233/sq mi)
- Demonym(s): Vilajuïguenc, vilajuïguenca
- Website: www.vilajuiga.cat

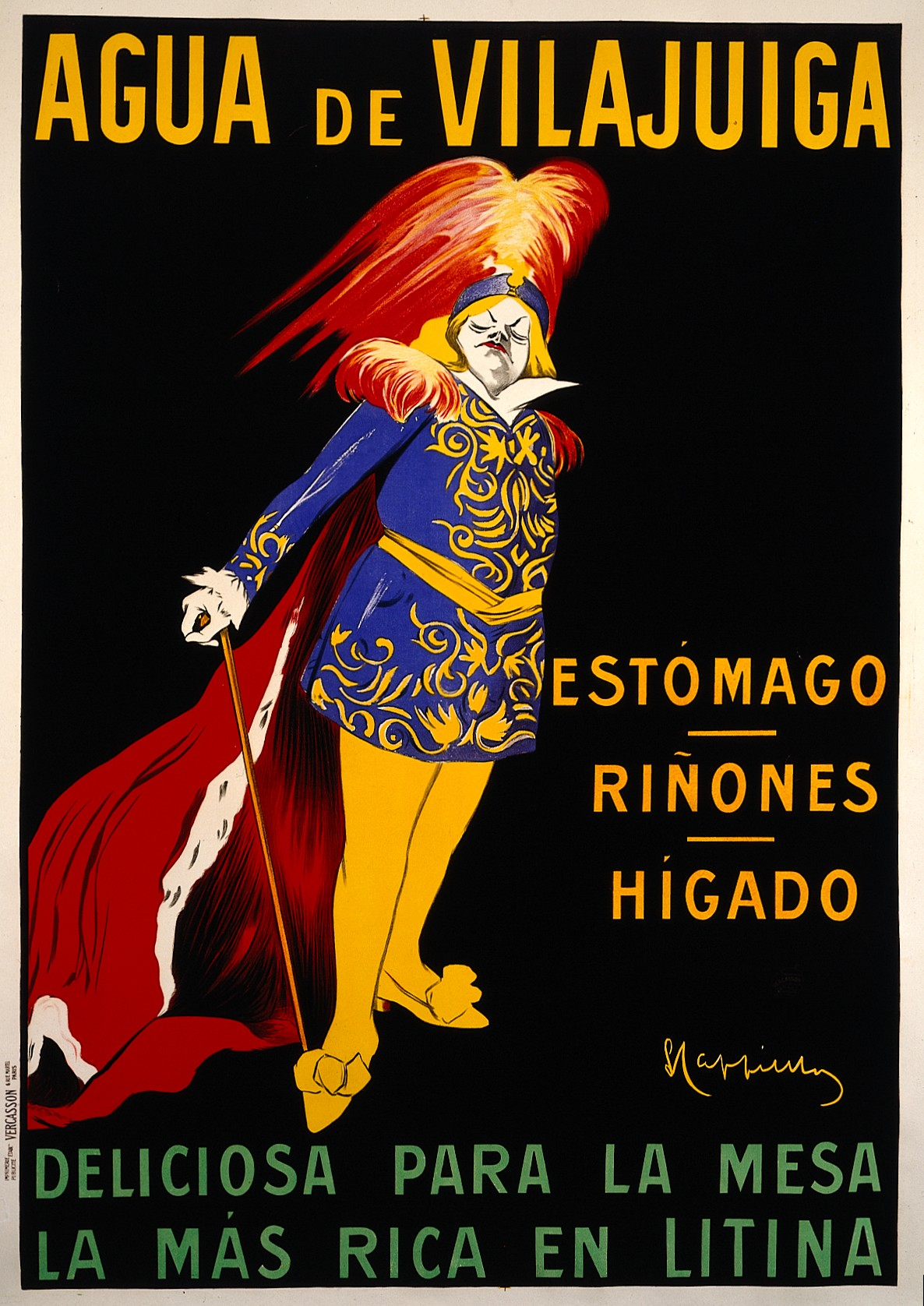
A man in Spanish costume advertising Vilajuïga mineral water. Colour lithograph by L. Cappiello, c. 1912.

Vilajuïga (Catalan pronunciation: [ˌbiləʒuˈiɣə]) is a municipality in the comarca of Alt Empordà, Girona, Catalonia, Spain.

Vilajuïga's area is home to a group of Megalithic dolmens. Starting from the 10th century AD it was a possession of the monastery of Sant Pere de Rodes. The municipality is first attested in 982 as Villa Iudaica, a name that has been interpreted as indicating the presence of a Jewish community in the area during the early medieval period. In the nearby is also the Quermançó Castle, documented from 1073.

The mineral water, Aigua de Vilajuïga, comes from here. It was reputed to be the only water drunk by the surrealist painter Salvador Dalí.
