= Terradas =

Terradas is a Spanish surname. Notable people with the surname include:

- Bartomeu Terradas (1874–1948), Spanish footballer
- Dolors Terradas (born 1949), Spanish teacher and politician
- Esteban Terradas i Illa (1883–1950), Spanish mathematician

== See also ==
- 2399 Terradas, a minor planet
