= Miriam Cárdenas de la Torre =

Mexican politician

- Born: 27 January 1977 (age 49); Chihuahua, Mexico
- Occupation: Politician
- Political party: PAN

Miriam Gabriela Cárdenas de la Torre (born 27 January 1977) is a Mexican politician from the National Action Party. In 2009 she served as Deputy of the LX Legislature of the Mexican Congress representing Chihuahua.
