= Dionis de Lys =

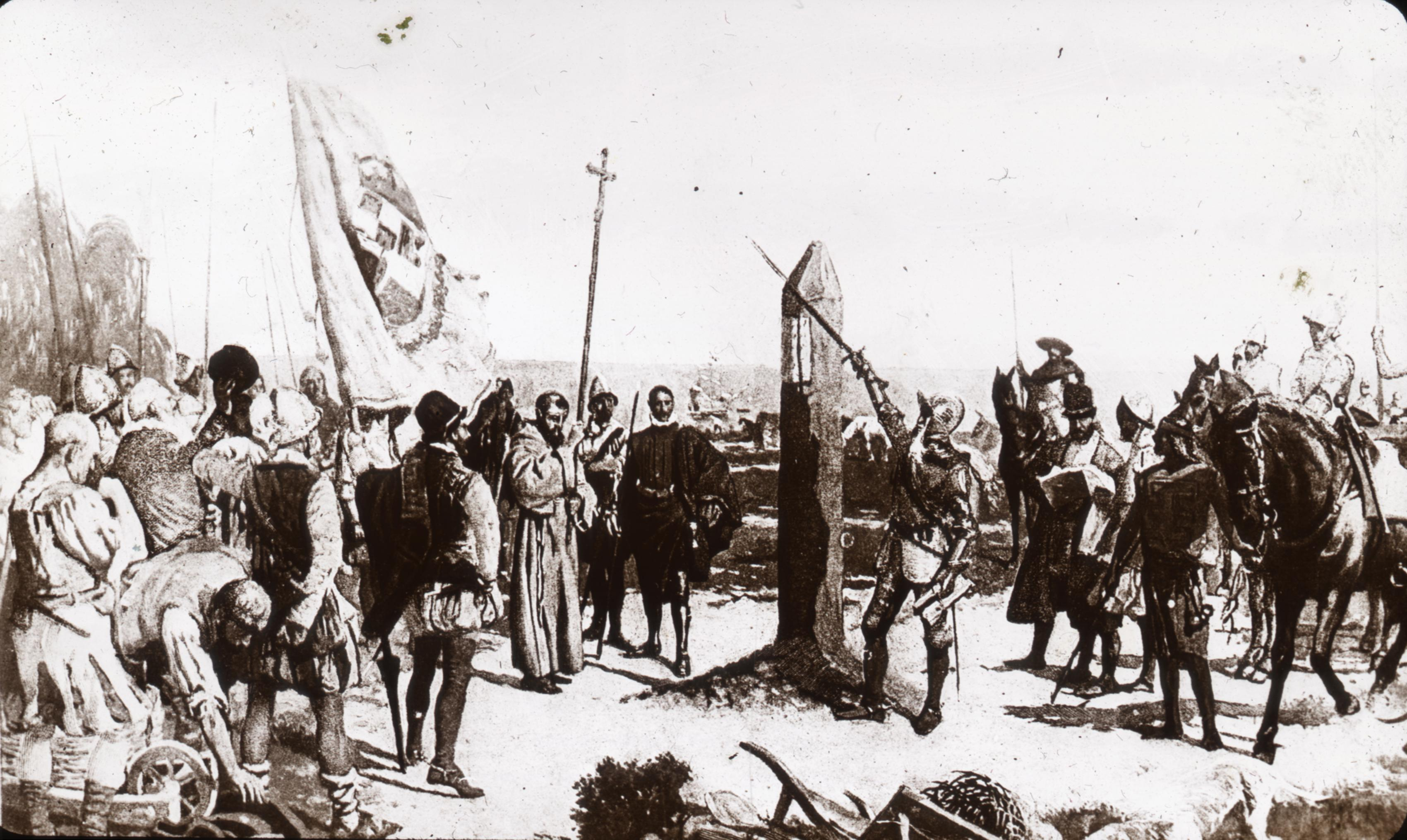
- First foundation of the city of Buenos Aires by Pedro de Mendoza

Conquistador of the Spanish Empire
- Monarch: Charles V

Personal details
- Born: Flanders, Habsburg Netherlands
- Died: Asunción, Viceroyalty of Peru
- Occupation: Conqueror explorer
- Profession: Sailor

Military service
- Allegiance: Spain
- Branch/service: Spanish Navy

Dionis de Lys or Lis was a Flemish conquistador in the service of the Spanish monarchy. He attended the first foundation of Buenos Aires by Pedro de Mendoza.

== Biography ==
Dionis was born in Lys, County of Flanders, the son of Johannes de Lys and Barboxa de Leys. He had arrived to the Río de la Plata in the expedition of Pedro de Mendoza, together with a contingents of Flemish adventurers.

Lys traveled to Asunción, where he formed a family, a daughter Catalina de Lys was married to Luis Alegre, also born in Flanders.
