= Sant Llorenç de la Muga =

- Municipality
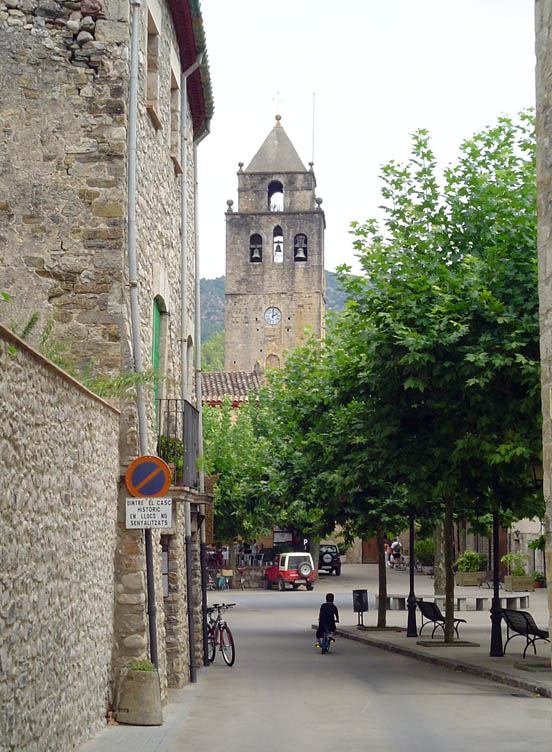
- Sant Llorenç de la Muga

- Flag Coat of arms

- Location in Catalonia Sant Llorenç de la Muga (Spain)
- Coordinates: 42°19′15″N 2°47′15″E
- Country: Spain
- Community: Catalonia
- Province: Girona
- Comarca: Alt Empordà

Government
  - Mayor: Lluís Vila Pujol (2015)

Area
  - Total: 31.8 km^{2} (12.3 sq mi)
- Elevation: 39 m (128 ft)

Population (2025-01-01)
  - Total: 247
  - Density: 7.77/km^{2} (20.1/sq mi)
- Website: ca.santllorençdelamuga.cat

Sant Llorenç de la Muga (Catalan pronunciation: [ˈsaɲ ʎuˈɾɛnz ðə lə ˈmuɣə]) is a municipality in the comarca of Alt Empordà, Province of Girona, Catalonia, Spain. It has an area of 31.8 km^{2} (12.3 sq mi) and a population of 247 as of 2025.

Sant Llorenç de la Muga is situated 16 km (9.9 mi) from Figueres.
