= Porto Alegre (disambiguation) =

Porto Alegre may refer to:

- Porto Alegre, a municipality that is also capital of the state of Rio Grande do Sul in Brazil.

- Porto Alegre Metro, a metro operated jointly by the federal government, the state government of Rio Grande do Sul and the city of Porto Alegre, Brazil.
- Porto Alegre Futebol Clube, a Brazilian football club from Porto Alegre, Brazil.

- Porto Alegre, São Tomé and Príncipe, a municipality on São Tomé Island in Caué District in São Tomé and Príncipe.

- Porto Alegre Airport, an airport serving the municipality of Porto Alegre on São Tomé Island in São Tomé and Príncipe.

== See also ==
- Portalegre (disambiguation)
