= José Rollin de la Torre-Bueno =

American entomologist (1871–1948)

José Rollin de la Torre-Bueno (6 October 1871 – 3 May 1948) was a Peruvian-American amateur entomologist. He served as the editor of the Bulletin of the Brooklyn Entomological Society for three decades until his death and was the author of the influential Glossary of Entomology, first published in 1937 and continually revised since then and known as The Torre-Bueno Glossary of Entomology.

Torre-Bueno was born to Jose Maria de la Torre Bueno and Elena Thorne Yzaquirre in Lima, Peru, in 1871 and when he was still a teenager, the family moved to the United States. He was educated at Columbia University and worked at the General Chemical Company where much of his work was editorial. He became a member of the Brooklyn Entomological Society and then became an editor of several journals. His entomological interest was mainly in the bugs, Heteroptera, and he published a three part Synopsis of the North American Hemiptera - Heteroptera and in 1937, a Glossary of Entomology which was based on a 1906 work by J.B. Smith and has since gone through numerous editions. He died in Tucson, Arizona and his specimen collections went to the University of Kansas.
