= Antonio de la Torre =

Antonio de la Torre may refer to:

- Antonio de la Torre (footballer, born 1951) (1951–2021), Mexican football defender
- Antonio de la Torre (actor) (born 1968), Spanish actor
- Antonio de la Torre (footballer, born 1977), Mexican football defender and son of footballer born 1951
- Antonio de la Torre (squash player) (born 1992), Guatemalan squash player
