= Claudio de la Torre =

Claudio de la Torre may refer to:

- Claudio de la Torre (writer) (1895–1973), Spanish novelist, poet, dramatist and film director
- Claudio de la Torre (actor) (born 1980), Venezuelan model and actor
