= Vilabertran =

- Municipality
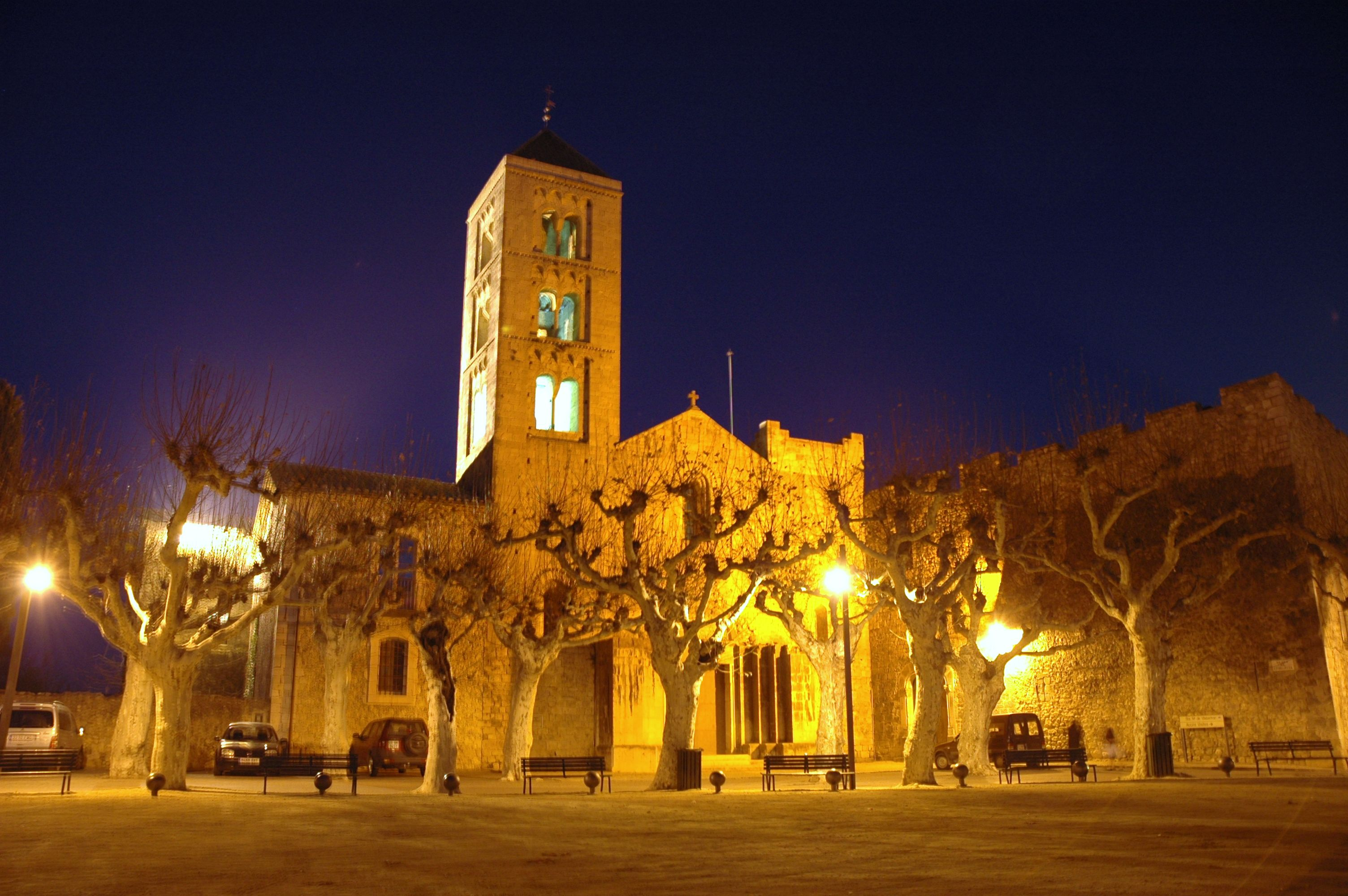
- St. Mary's monastery

- Flag Coat of arms

- Location in Catalonia Vilabertran (Spain)
- Coordinates: 42°17′N 2°59′E
- Country: Spain
- Community: Catalonia
- Province: Girona
- Comarca: Alt Empordà

Government
  - Mayor: Martí Armadà Pujol (2015)

Area
  - Total: 2.3 km^{2} (0.89 sq mi)

Population (2025-01-01)
  - Total: 961
  - Density: 420/km^{2} (1,100/sq mi)
- Website: www.vilabertran.cat

Vilabertran (Catalan pronunciation: [ˌbiləβəɾˈtɾan]) is a municipality in the comarca of Alt Empordà, Girona, Catalonia, Spain.
