= Laura de la Torre (volleyball) =

Spanish volleyball player (born 1974)

Personal information
- Full name: Laura de la Torre Tur
- Nationality: Spanish
- Born: 16 March 1974 (age 52); Palma de Mallorca, Islas Baleares, Spain

Laura de la Torre Tur (born 16 March 1974) is a Spanish former volleyball player who competed in the 1992 Summer Olympics.
