= Alegre River =

Alegre River may refer to:

== Brazil ==
- Alegre River (Espírito Santo)
- Alegre River (Goiás)
- Alegre River (Guaporé)
- Alegre River (Maranhão)
- Alegre River (Mato Grosso)
- Alegre River (Paraná)
- Alegre River (Rio de Janeiro)

== Mexico ==
- Alegre River (Mexico)

== Venezuela ==
- Alegre River (Venezuela)
