= El Far d'Empordà =

- Municipality
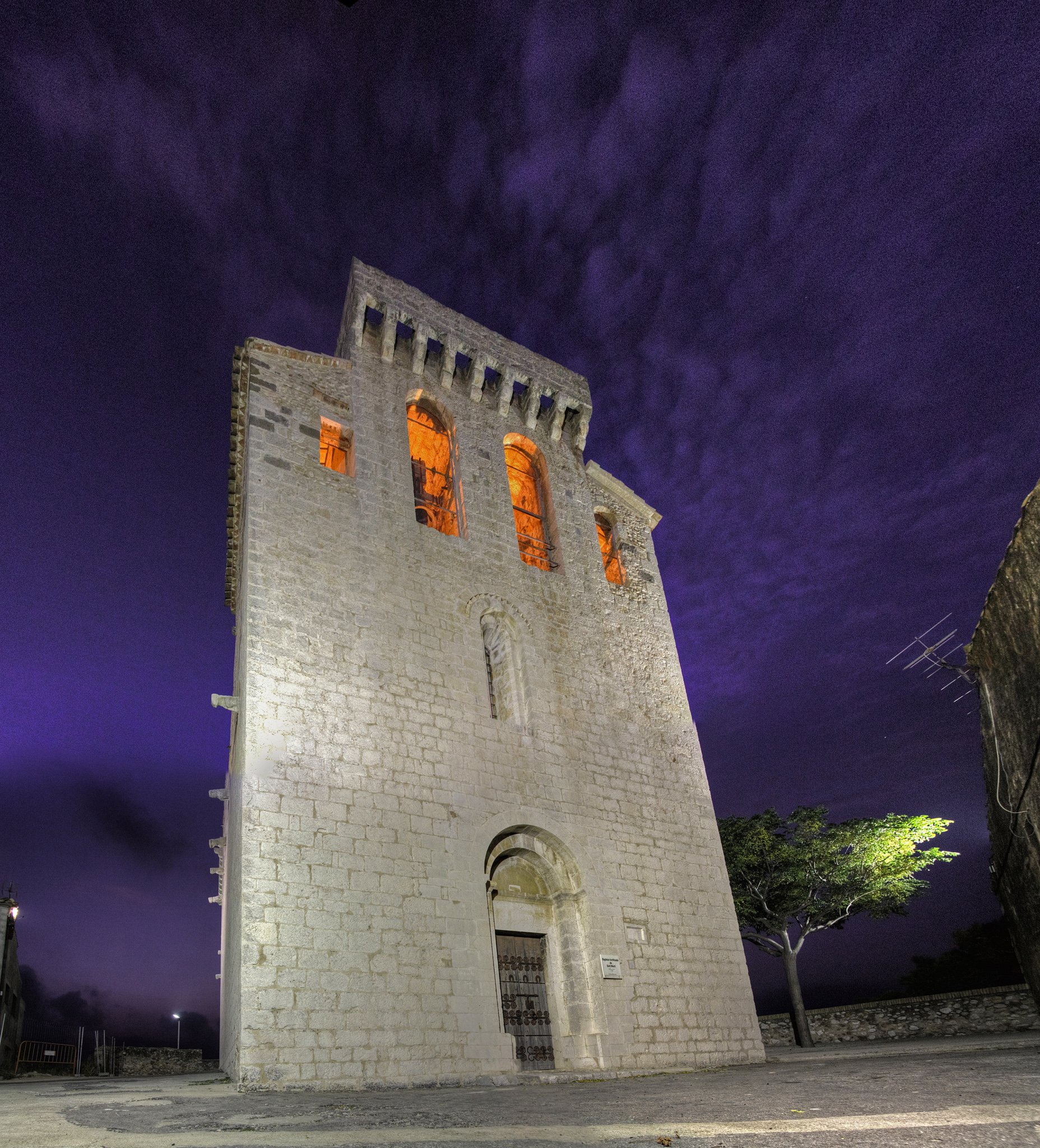
- St. Martin's church

- Location in Catalonia El Far d'Empordà (Spain)
- Coordinates: 42.254°N 2.996°E
- Country: Spain
- Community: Catalonia
- Province: Girona
- Comarca: Alt Empordà

Government
  - Mayor: Jaume Arnall Figueras (2015)

Area
  - Total: 9.0 km^{2} (3.5 sq mi)

Population (2025-01-01)
  - Total: 628
  - Density: 70/km^{2} (180/sq mi)
- Website: webspobles2.ddgi.cat/elfardemporda

El Far d'Empordà (Catalan pronunciation: [əl ˈfa ðəmpuɾˈða]) is a municipality in the comarca of Alt Empordà, Girona, Catalonia, Spain.

== See also ==
- Molí de la Torre, farmhouse in El Far d'Empordà
