= Molí de la Torre =

Catalan farmhouse

Tower Mill
- Molí de la Torre
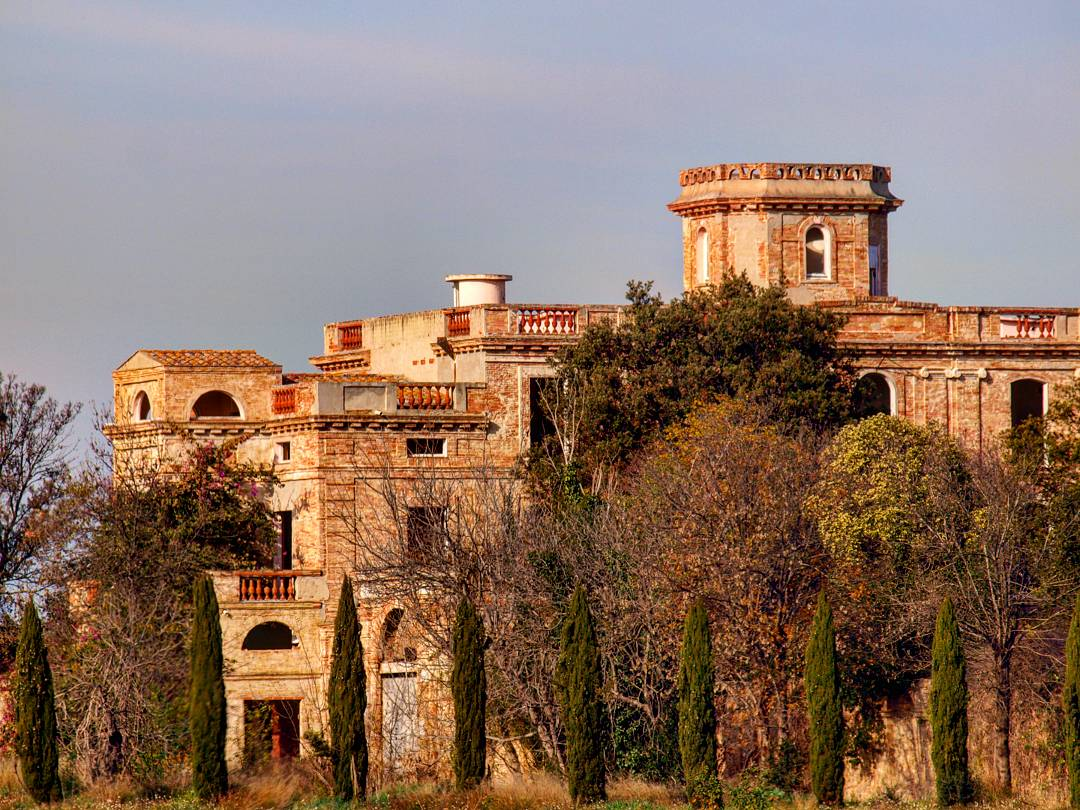

General information
- Architectural style: Neoclassicism - romantic
- Location: Alt Empordà, Girona, Catalonia, Near C-31 road., El Far d'Empordà, Spain
- Coordinates: 42.238331°N 2.978378°E
- Opened: 1853

Technical details
- Material: brick

Design and construction
- Architect: Josep Roca i Bros
- Designations: included in the register of Architectural Heritage of Catalonia

The Molí de la Torre (meaning The Tower mill) is a Catalan farmhouse located near Figueres in the municipality of El Far d'Empordà. It was built in the mid-19th century and is considered one of the most important house and farm of Empordà and included in the register of Architectural Heritage of Catalonia.

The Molí de la Torre is a detached large building located away from the core of El Far d'Empordà, near the C-31 bearing Figueres to La Bisbal d'Empordà. It is built entirely of brick, with a big fence that hinders the access which has three openings, the central with an arch with pilasters on the sides .

The construction consists of different bodies with different heights, the main building is ground floor, first and second floor, replaced by attic on the second building. Highlight the pillars that exist in each side of the access door and turn the front upstairs to the top floor with scrolls. The roof of the building is a terrace with a balustrade railing, and a polygonal tower in the center which rises a few feet above the building.

== History ==
=== Origins (1853-1906) ===
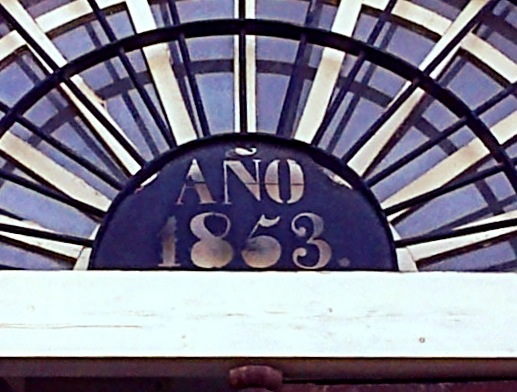
main door 1853

The building was constructed in 1853, as indicated by the wrought iron lintel of the door, by an order of Narcis Fonsdeviela, Marques de la Torre. The building is attributed to the architect Josep Roca i Bros who built the most of public works at that time.

Initially it was a Gristmill, first of Watermills benefit from the irrigation of Alguemà river, passing through Pont del Princep (also called Rec the molins). On the back passes an artificial canal which until 1950 generated its own light with a dynamo. One of the first owners was Manuel Lleonci, Councilman of Figueres (1862). In that time the mill worked 200 days a year with an average of six hours per day.

The property passed in 1899 to Miquel Plana Goytisolo who was the owner of the Granja Avícola del Molí de la Torre, along with his partner Miquel Sola.

=== Maria Pichot (1906 -1926) ===
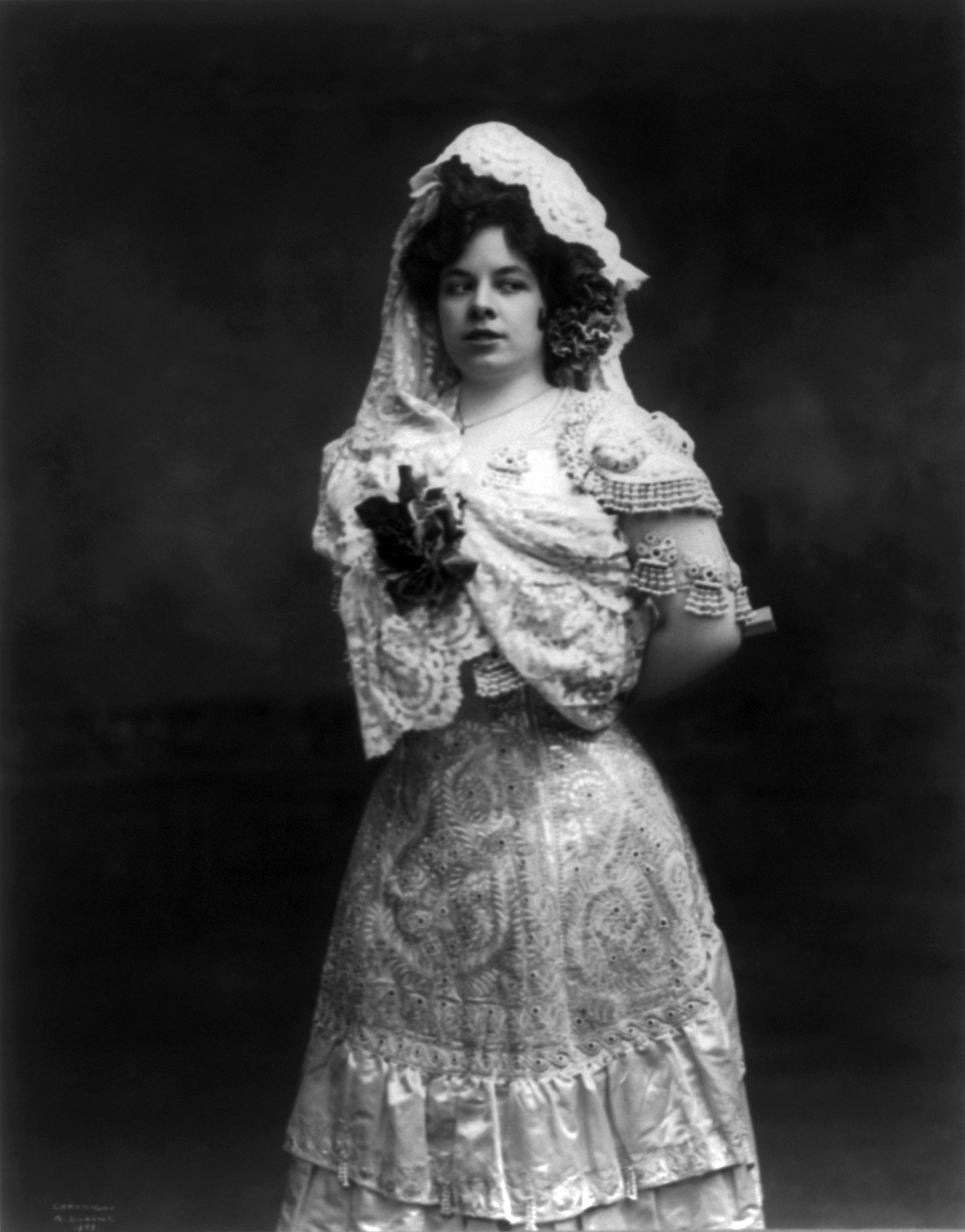
Maria Gay, mezzo-soprano, as Carmen in 1909

Maria Pichot i Girones, an opera artist with French nationality and married with the composer Joan Gay, acquired the estate in 1906. The purchase was made in front of notary of Figueres, Salvador Dalí i Cusí, the artist's father. His brother Pepito Pitxot, resident and horticulturist in Figueres, was in charge of the property.

In May 1916 a young Dalí spent a season in the Molí de la Torre and discovered the Impressionism through the collection of the painter Ramon Pichot. In his autobiography Dalí Secret Life includes a drawing of the building and describes his first contact with the Molí de la Torre: "I'm impressed as a magical place, was made specifically for the continuation of my dream and fantasize awake" and also stated "At the place where they occur most of my dreams, especially those of an erotic nature".

=== House of Rubert’s family (1927-1985) ===
Juan Rubert y Comas bought the Molí de la Torre for 106,000 pesetas in 1927 and settled there with his wife Antonia Lopez de Tejeiro and their children. During the Spanish Civil War the house was respected because Rubert, who lived during the fight in the Llombart Hotel of Figueres, used his Puerto Rican nationality.

The estate passed to his three daughters Isabel, Juana, and Antonia. On 8 September 1973 Dalí visited the Molí de la Torre, with the painter Antoni Pitxot and guided by Antonia Rubert, to cover all the corners of the house. Dalí told that from the terrace of the house had painted several landscapes of the Empordà.

The North American collector Albert Reynolds Morse, founder of the Salvador Dalí Museum in St. Petersburg, Florida, who visited the mill several times, included a photo in his book Dalí. A panorama of his art.

=== Luxury residence (1986-1995) ===
In 1986 the building was sold to the architect Juan Antoni Rodeja and other partners in Figueres. They built three luxury homes and a few years later the building was sold.

=== Naïve Museum (1996 - 2000) ===
The Molí de la Torre became a museum of Naïve art in 1996 when French biologist Albert Laporte and his Spanish wife Ana Perez bought the house. In May 1998 they opened a museum of naive art to show their collection of 1,500 paintings and sculptures.

The initiative had a little interest and LaPorte dream ended after 2 years when the museum was closed. Forecasts anticipated 200,000 museum visitors a year but the total in two seasons did not exceed 30,000.

=== Present ===
In 2000 Jose Arias bought the building and between 2007 and 2008 the ground floor was enabled as a restaurant and the first floor as a dwelling. In 2013 the building was vacated.
