= Luisa Gómez de la Torre Paez =

Ecuadorian feminist, educator, and activist

- Born: María Luisa Gómez de la Torre Páez; May 28, 1887; Quito
- Died: 1976 (aged 88–89); Quito
- Citizenship: Ecuadorian
- Occupations: Feminist, educator
- Political party: Communist Party of Ecuador
- Parents: Joaquín Gómez de la Torre Álvarez (father); Francisca Páez Rodríguez (mother)

María Luisa Gómez de la Torre Páez (b. 28 May 1887 – d. 1976) was an Ecuadorian feminist, educator, and activist. She was a pioneer in the struggle for the rights of the indigenous peoples and peasants in Ecuador. She was the first woman to serve as a teacher for boys in Quito.

== Biography ==
Luisa Gómez de la Torre Paez was born on 28 May 1887 to parents Joaquín Gómez de la Torre Álvarez and Francisca Páez Rodríguez. In 1944, she participated in the creation of the first indigenous peoples' rights organization, called the Ecuadorian Federation of Indians (FEI). She also worked with the Indigenista Dolores Cacuango to found bilingual (Quecha and Spanish) schools to bring literacy to the indigenous peasantry in the countryside.

In the political arena, de la Torre is considered one of the pioneers of the political left in Ecuador along with Guayaquileñas Aurora López, Isabel Herrera, Ana Moreno and Quiteñas Nela Martínez and Laura Almeida. With these connections, she participated in the 1926 founding of the Socialist Party of Ecuador. Four years later, de la Torre formed the Club of Professors of Mejía. In 1937 she, with other colleagues, founded the Syndicate of Professors of Mejía and in 1946 expanded this into the Ecuadorian Teachers' Union.

De la Torre was one of the founding members (with Virginia Larenas, Raquel Verdesoto, Matilde Hidalgo and Nela Martínez) of the Ecuadorian Women's Alliance in 1938.
