= Alethse de la Torre Rosas =

Mexican infectious disease specialist

- Education: National Autonomous University of Mexico; London School of Hygiene & Tropical Medicine
- Occupation: Infectious disease researcher

Alethse de la Torre Rosas is a Mexican physician and infectious diseases specialist. Since 2018 she has been Director General of the National Center for the Prevention and Control of HIV / AIDS.

== Education ==
She earned a medical degree National Autonomous University of Mexico, and a master's degree in public health from London School of Hygiene and Tropical Medicine. She was advisor to the Pan American Health Organization (PAHO). She is a professor at Universidad La Salle México, and Panamerican University.
