= Latorre =

Latorre is a surname. Notable people with the surname include:

- Claudio Latorre, Chilean soccer player
- Diego Latorre, Argentine soccer player
- Javier Latorre, Spanish dancer
- Jimena Hebe Latorre, Argentine politician
- Juan Carlos Latorre, Chilean politician
- Juan José Latorre, Chilean vice admiral
- Lorenzo Latorre, president of Uruguay
- Mariano Latorre, Chilean writer
- Roxana Latorre, Argentine senator
- Tyler LaTorre, American baseball catcher
- Xavier Diaz-Latorre, Spanish musician

== See also ==
- Chilean ship Almirante Latorre
