= Vila-sacra =

- Municipality
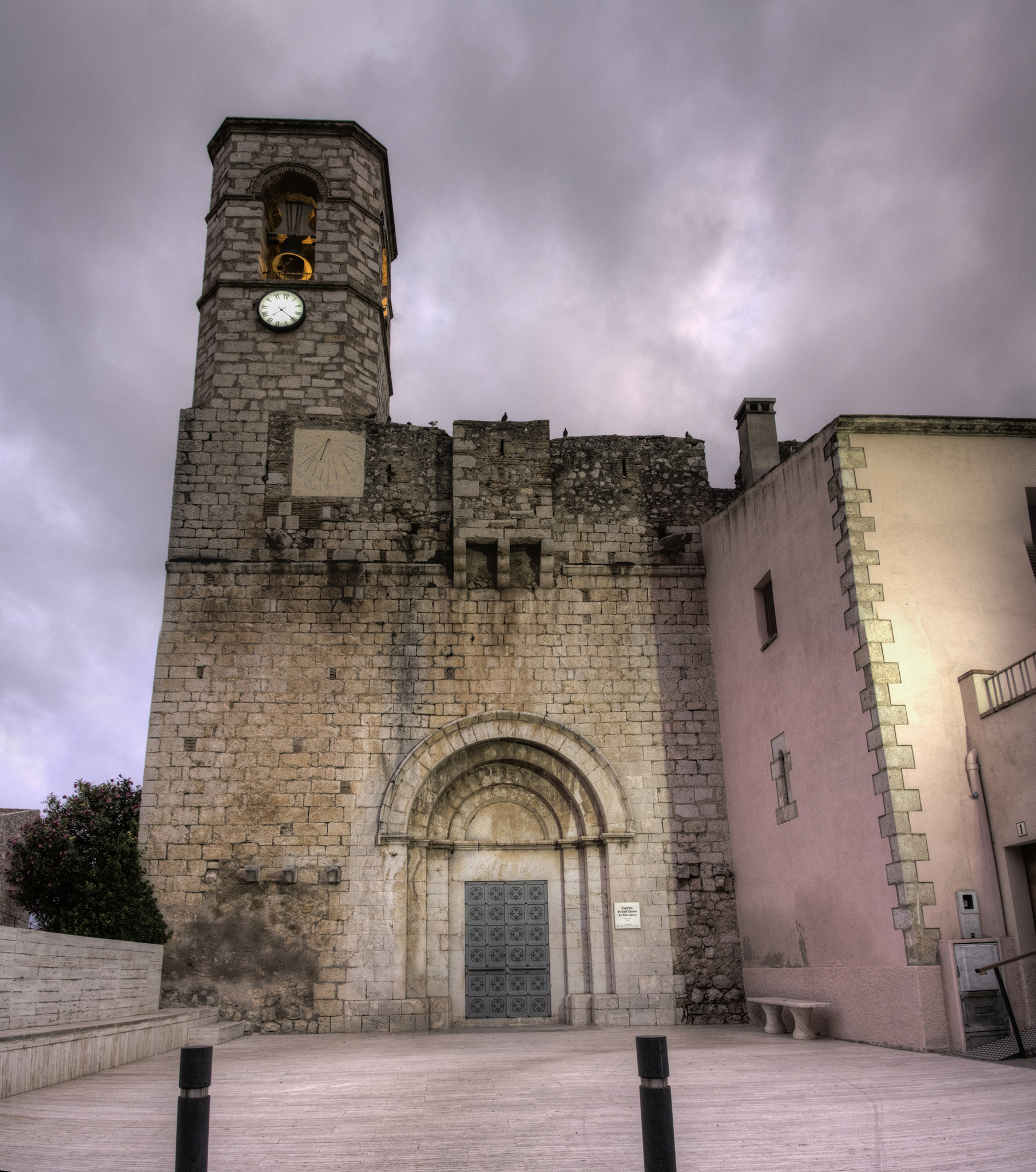
- Church of Sant Esteve de Vila-sacra

- Coat of arms

- Location in Catalonia Vila-sacra (Spain)
- Coordinates: 42°16′N 3°1′E
- Country: Spain
- Community: Catalonia
- Province: Girona
- Comarca: Alt Empordà

Government
  - Mayor: Maria Corbairan Isern (2019 un) (JuntsXCat)

Area
  - Total: 6.0 km^{2} (2.3 sq mi)

Population (2025-01-01)
  - Total: 878
  - Density: 150/km^{2} (380/sq mi)
- Website: www.vila-sacra.cat

Vila-sacra (Catalan pronunciation: [ˌbiləˈsakɾə]) is a municipality in the comarca of Alt Empordà, Girona, Catalonia, Spain.
