= Saus =

Coordinates: 42.1325°N 2.97759°E

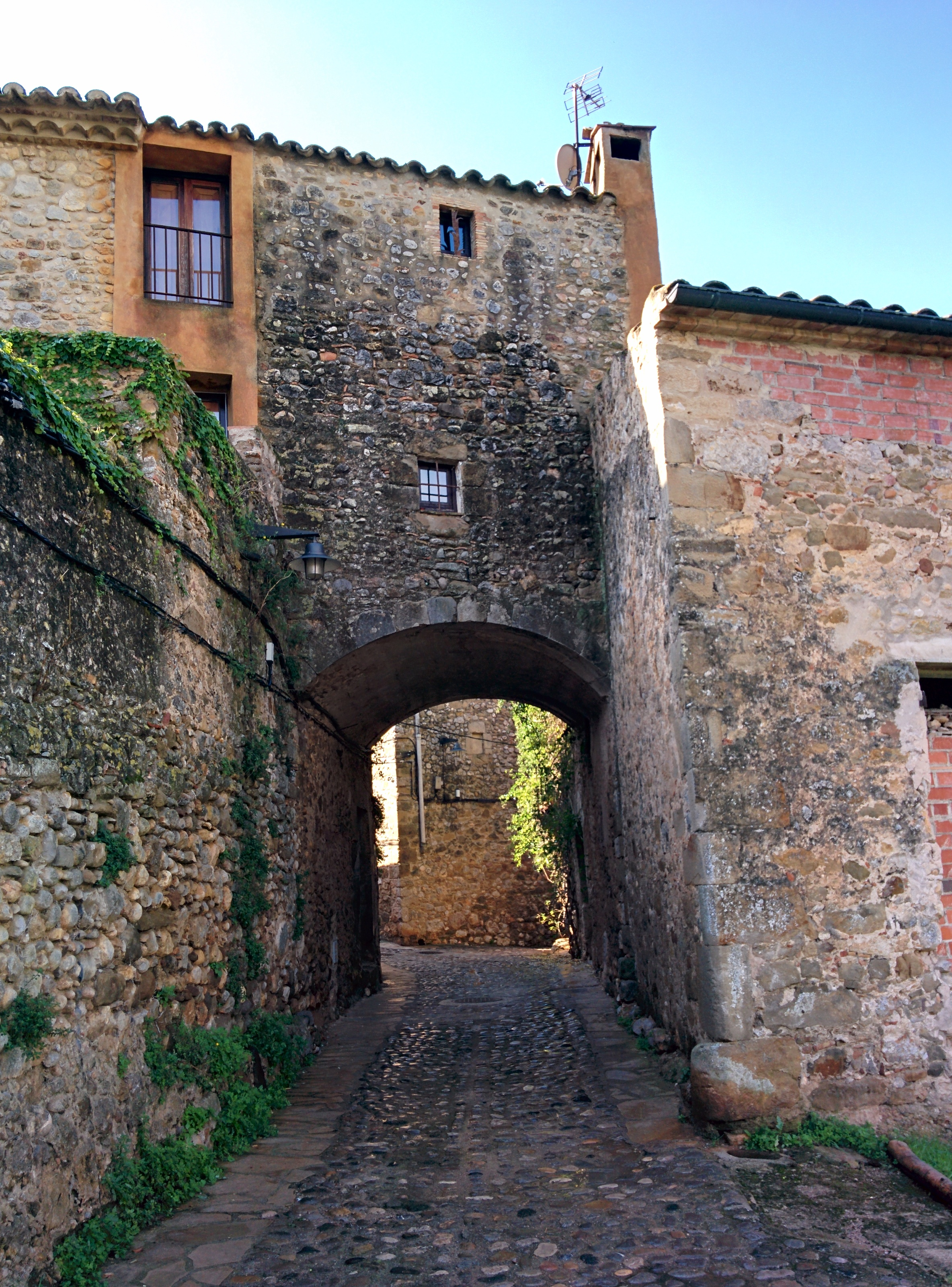
Saus

Saus is a settlement in the municipality of the Saus, Camallera i Llampaies in the comarca of Alt Empordà, Girona, Catalonia, Spain.
