= Ventalló =

- Municipality
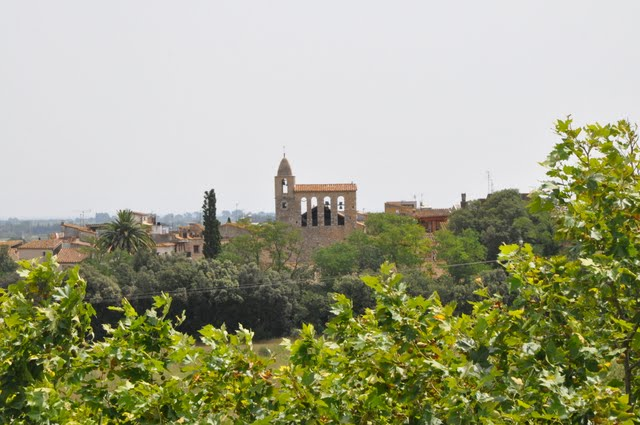

- Coat of arms

- Location in Catalonia Ventalló (Spain)
- Coordinates: 42°9′N 3°2′E
- Country: Spain
- Community: Catalonia
- Province: Girona
- Comarca: Alt Empordà

Government
  - Mayor: Joan Albert Teixidor (2015)

Area
  - Total: 25.0 km^{2} (9.7 sq mi)

Population (2025-01-01)
  - Total: 914
  - Density: 36.6/km^{2} (94.7/sq mi)
- Website: ventallo.cat

Ventalló (Catalan pronunciation: [bəntəˈʎo]) is a municipality in the comarca of Alt Empordà, Girona, Catalonia, Spain.
