= Sant Miquel de Fluvià =

- Municipality
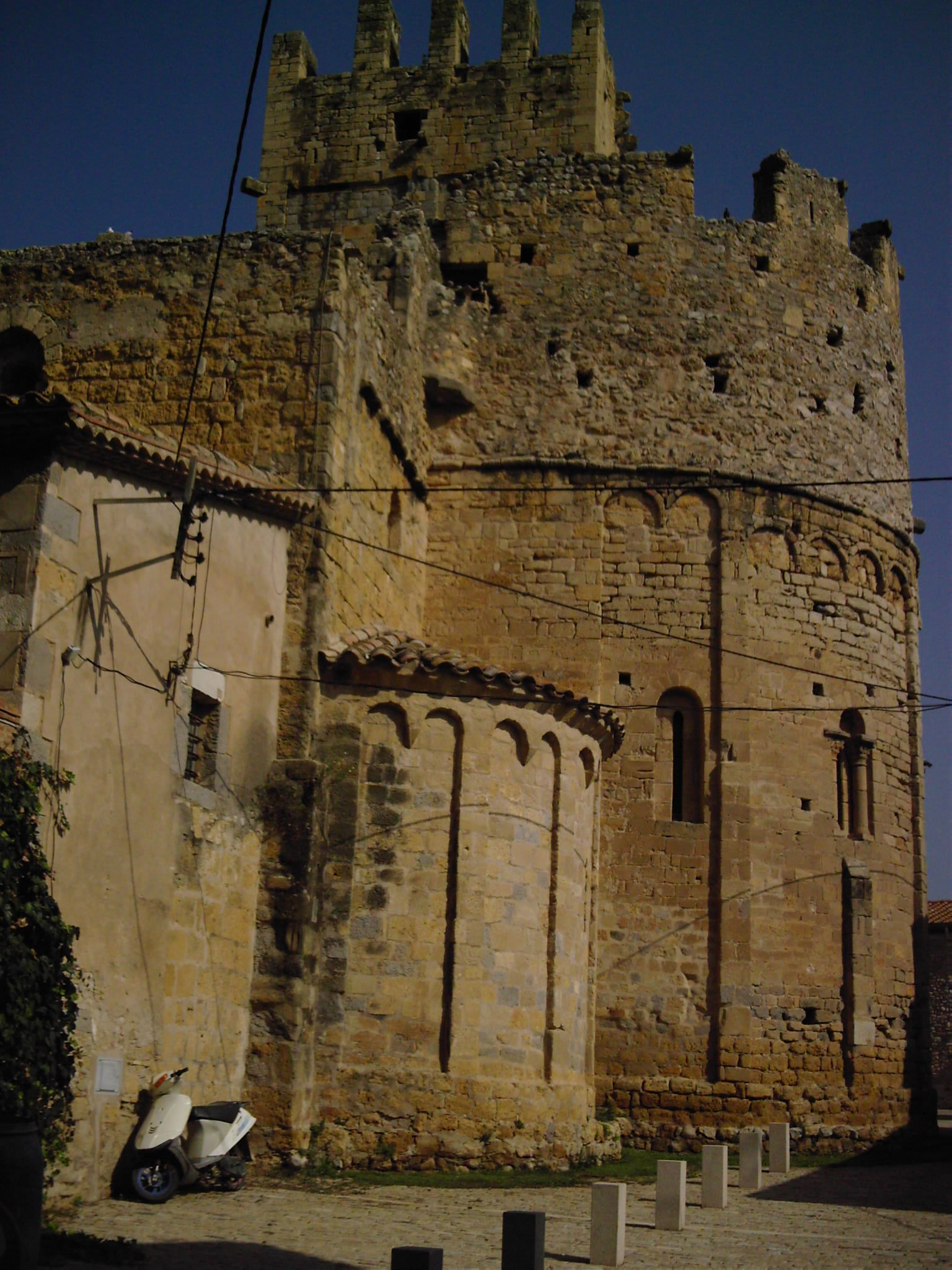
- Parish church

- Coat of arms

- Location in Catalonia Sant Miquel de Fluvià (Spain)
- Coordinates: 42.177°N 2.993°E
- Country: Spain
- Community: Catalonia
- Province: Girona
- Comarca: Alt Empordà

Government
  - Mayor: Àngel Posas Agulló (2015)

Area
  - Total: 3.5 km^{2} (1.4 sq mi)

Population (2025-01-01)
  - Total: 860
  - Density: 250/km^{2} (640/sq mi)
- Website: www.santmiquelfluvia.cat

Sant Miquel de Fluvià (Catalan pronunciation: [ˈsam miˈkɛl də fluβiˈa]) is a municipality in the comarca of Alt Empordà, Girona, Catalonia, Spain. The original part of the village lies just to the north of the river Fluvià and is dominated by the tower of an 11th-century church that was originally part of a Benedictine monastery that has since disappeared.

The village has expanded northwards in modern times. It has a railway station on the main line between Figueres and Girona. A good number of the inhabitants trace their origins to Andalucia in southern Spain because migrant workers employed on railway construction settled there. The Falgàs sausage factory in the village provides local employment.
