= Ricardo Alegre =

Mexican politician

- Born: 4 March 1959 (age 67); Veracruz, Mexico
- Occupation: Politician
- Political party: PAN

Ricardo Alegre Bojórquez (born 4 March 1959) is a Mexican politician affiliated with the National Action Party. As of 2014 he served as Deputy of the LIX Legislature of the Mexican Congress representing Querétaro.
