= Torroella de Fluvià =

- Municipality
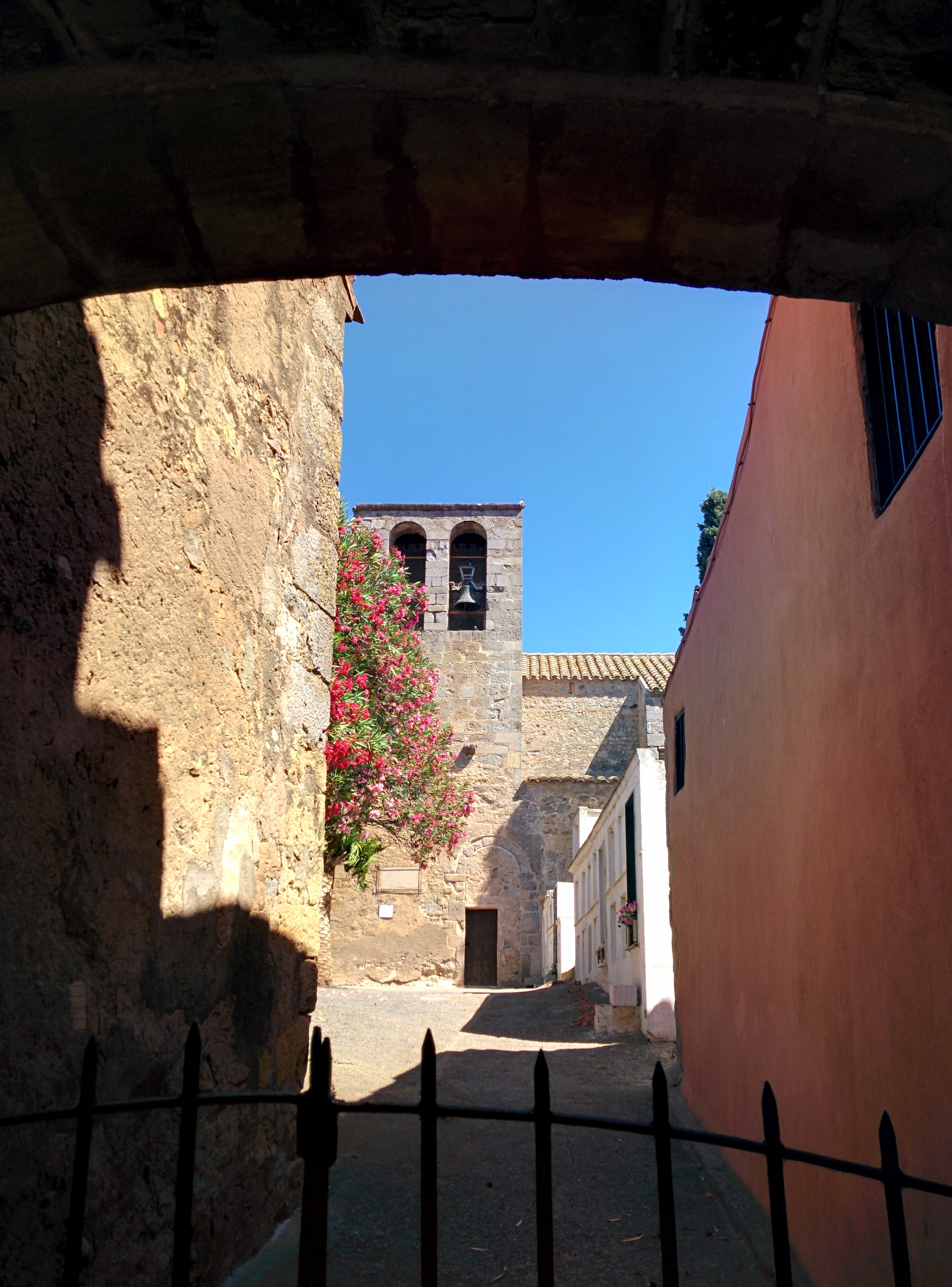
- Church of Sant Esteve de Vilacolum

- Flag Coat of arms

- Location in Catalonia Torroella de Fluvià (Spain)
- Coordinates: 42.176°N 3.042°E
- Country: Spain
- Community: Catalonia
- Province: Girona
- Comarca: Alt Empordà

Government
  - Mayor: Pedro Moradell Puig (2015)

Area
  - Total: 16.8 km^{2} (6.5 sq mi)

Population (2025-01-01)
  - Total: 778
  - Density: 46.3/km^{2} (120/sq mi)
- Website: www.torroelladefluvia.cat

Torroella de Fluvià (Catalan pronunciation: [turuˈeʎə ðə fluβiˈa]) is a municipality in the comarca of Alt Empordà, Girona, Catalonia, Spain. It includes the village of Vilacolum. The 11th Century Church of Sant Tomàs de Fluvià is a notable romanesque landmark.
