= Torredembarra =

- Municipality
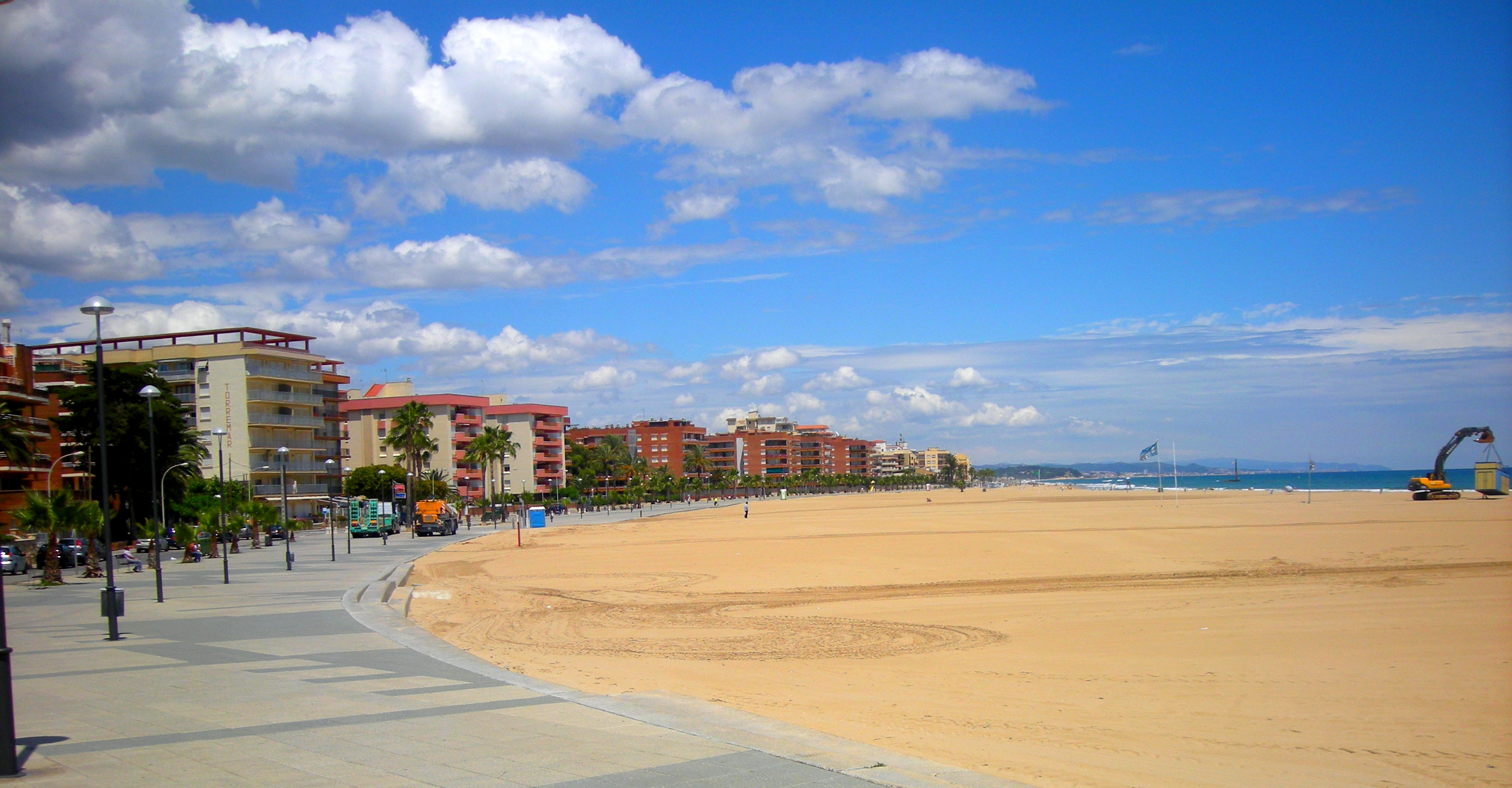
- Torredembarra beach

- Flag Coat of arms
- Nickname: Torrenc
- Location in Catalonia
- Coordinates: 41°09′N 1°24′E
- Country: Spain
- Community: Catalonia
- Province: Tarragona
- Comarca: Tarragonès

Government
  - Mayor: Eduard Rovira Gual (2015) (ERC)

Area
  - Total: 8.7 km^{2} (3.4 sq mi)
- Elevation: 5 m (16 ft)

Population (2025-01-01)
  - Total: 18,237
  - Density: 2,100/km^{2} (5,400/sq mi)
- Demonym: Torrenc
- Postal code: 43830
- Website: torredembarra.cat

Torredembarra (Catalan pronunciation: [ˌtorəðəmˈbarə]), normally called La Torre by its inhabitants, is a town in the comarca of the Tarragonès, in the province of Tarragona, Catalonia, Spain. It is located on the Costa Daurada, it faces Altafulla to the west, La Pobla de Montornès to the north, Creixell to the east and Mediterranean Sea in the south. It is 13 km to Tarragona's northeast and about 100 km southwest Barcelona. It has a population of 18,237 (register office, 2025).

The GR 92 long distance footpath, which roughly follows the length of the Mediterranean coast of Spain, has a staging point at Torredembarra. Stage 24 links northwards to Calafell, a distance of 15.0 kilometres (9.3 mi), whilst stage 25 links southwards to Tarragona, a distance of 20.0 kilometres (12.4 mi).

== Twin towns ==
- Villars, France
- Halberstadt, Germany
