= Canito (footballer, born 1956) =

Spanish footballer (1956–2000)

Personal information
- Full name: José Cano López
- Date of birth: 23 April 1956
- Place of birth: Llavorsí, Spain
- Date of death: 25 November 2000 (aged 44)
- Place of death: La Pobla de Montornès, Spain
- Height: 1.85 m (6 ft 1 in)
- Position: Defensive midfielder

Youth career
- Iberia

Senior career*
Years	Team	Apps	(Gls)
1974–1975	Lloret		
1975–1979	Español	43	(5)
1975–1976	→ Lleida (loan)	32	(1)
1977–1978	→ Cádiz (loan)	20	(0)
1979–1981	Barcelona	25	(2)
1981–1982	Español	31	(4)
1982–1984	Betis	54	(1)
1984–1985	Zaragoza	24	(0)
1985–1986	Belenenses	17	(1)
1986–1987	Lloret		
1988	Iberiana		
Total		246+	(14+)

International career
1976–1977	Spain U21	2	(0)
1979	Spain amateur	4	(1)
1981	Spain B	1	(0)
1978	Spain	1	(0)
- * Club domestic league appearances and goals

José Cano López (23 April 1956 – 25 November 2000), known as Canito, was a Spanish professional footballer who played during the 1970s and 1980s.

In his career, amongst others, the defensive midfielder represented both major clubs in Barcelona, Español and FC Barcelona. Abroad, he appeared for Belenenses in Portugal.

== Club career ==
Born in Llavorsí, Province of Lleida, Catalonia, Canito began playing professionally with RCD Español. After serving two loans, at UE Lleida and Cádiz CF, he moved permanently to the first team.

After solid displays in the 1978–79 season, Canito signed with neighbouring FC Barcelona. He helped the side to win the Copa del Rey in his second year, but was also ostracised following an incident involving his main club Español: as they were fighting to avoid relegation from La Liga against Hércules CF, he was warming up on the sidelines for Barcelona, and celebrated when the Pericos scored the goal which led to salvation to the fury of the crowd at the Camp Nou.

Canito then rejoined Español as part of the deal that sent Urruti in the opposite direction, but left one year later after falling out with coach José María Maguregui. He then represented Real Betis, Real Zaragoza and also spent one season in Portugal with C.F. Os Belenenses, subsequently returning to his country and retiring in amateur football at the age of 32.

== International career ==
Canito earned his sole cap for Spain on 21 December 1978, playing the last 20 minutes of the 1–0 friendly defeat to Italy in Rome.

== Death ==
After retiring, Canito fell into a severe drug addiction. Even though he was aided psychologically and economically by Barcelona and Espanyol's Veterans Associations, he could not recover, and was found dead in his sister's home in La Pobla de Montornès, Province of Tarragona, on 25 November 2000; he was 44 years old.

== Honours ==
Barcelona

- Copa del Rey: 1980–81
