= Vila-seca =

- Municipality
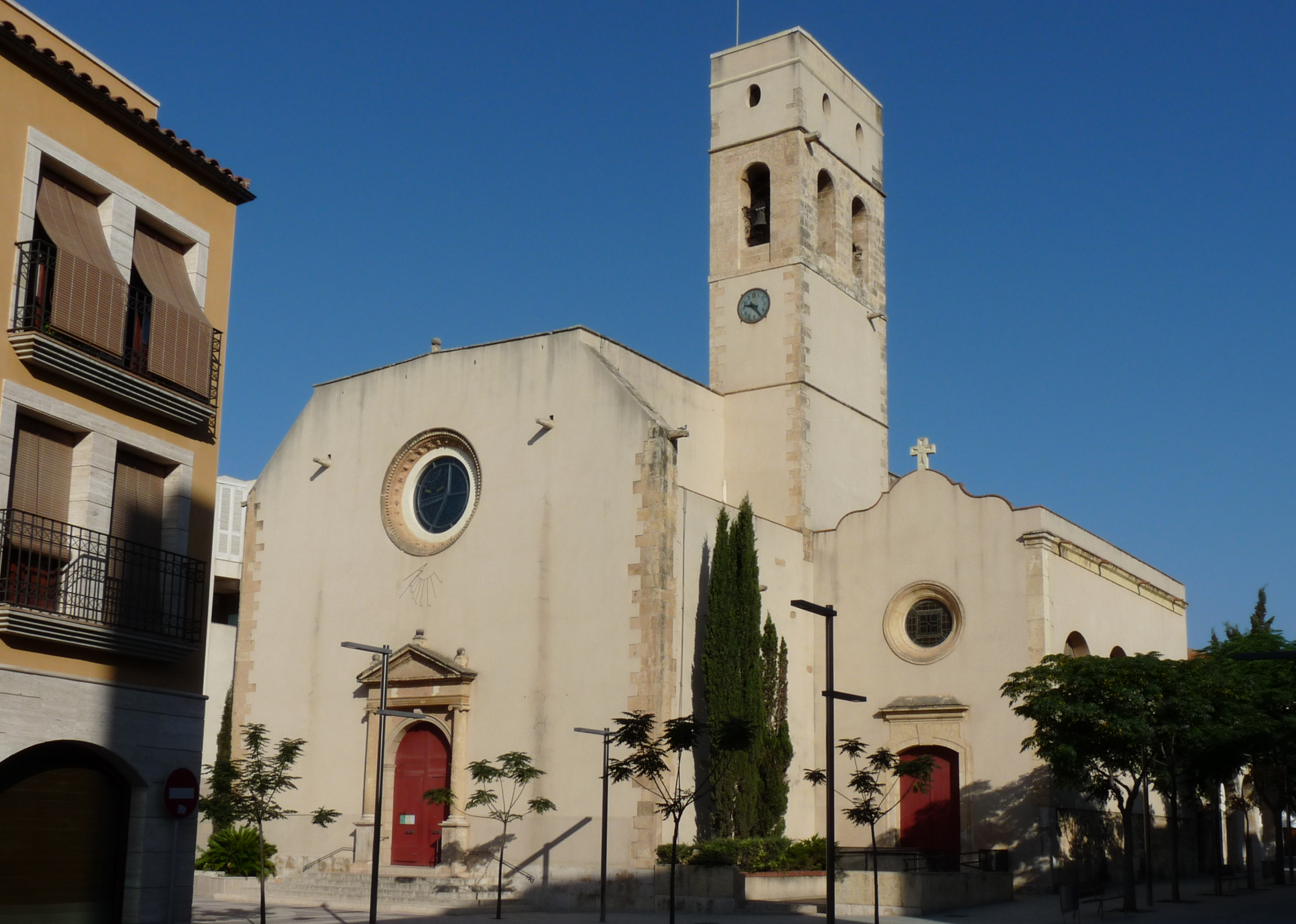
- Sant Esteve church

- Coat of arms

- Location in Catalonia
- Coordinates: 41°06′39″N 1°08′42″E
- Country: Spain
- Community: Catalonia
- Province: Tarragona
- Comarca: Tarragonès

Government
  - Type: Mayor–council
  - Body: Ajuntament de Vila-seca
  - Mayor: Pere Segura (2026)

Area
  - Total: 21.6 km^{2} (8.3 sq mi)
- Elevation (AMSL): 42 m (138 ft)

Population (2025-01-01)
  - Total: 23,917
  - Density: 1,110/km^{2} (2,870/sq mi)
- Demonym(s): vila-secà, vila-secana vila-secano, vila-secana
- Postal code: 43480
- Area code: +34 (Spain) 977 (Province)
- Website: vila-seca.cat

Vila-seca (Catalan pronunciation: [ˈbilə ˈsɛkə]; literally 'Dry-town') is a municipality of the comarca of Tarragonès, in the province of Tarragona, in Catalonia, Spain. It has a population of 23,917 (register office, 2025).

The historical name was Vila-seca de Solcina and since the 80's known as Vila-seca i Salou until Salou was segregated from Vila-seca on 1989, however the municipality includes the urban areas of La Plana and La Pineda. Vila-seca has a large petrochemical complex shared with Tarragona and La Canonja, including Repsol complex in El Morell makes one of the greatest petrochemical areas of Europe like Ludwigshafen am Rhein.

== History ==
Different remains show that the city was populated during the times of Ancient Rome. The population settled in Vila-seca after the reconquest in 1162 when King Alfonso II of Aragon gave these lands to Ramón de Olzina. Its donation to this family was confirmed by King Peter II of Aragon in 1208.

During the Middle Ages, there was another town known as Vilaseca del Comú, which neighboured Vila-seca as owned by the Olzinas. The former belonged to the Archbishop of Tarragona until 1525, which the unification of the two towns was decreed, created the city of Vila-seca as it is known today.

Vila-seca actively participated in the defense of the port of Salou, gaining on several occasions ownership of it. The port was a strategic military position and an important source of income. For a long time, it was considered the port of all of the people who made up the Comuna del Camp, until King Ferdinand II of Aragon banned its use. Vila-seca then became the main port, leading to the city suffering several attacks from Berber pirates. A watchtower and a defense tower were built to protect the city from corsair attacks.

During the Reapers' War, the city was occupied by troops under King Philip IV of Spain. Many of the city's defenders were executed and both the church and townhall were burnt down. Vila-seca's population also suffered large losses during the Peninsular War.

At the end of the twentieth century, Salou separated from Vila-seca, becoming its own municipality.

== Geography and climate ==
Vila-seca has a Mediterranean climate with hot summers and mild winters. The humid season (the highest amount of annual rain) lasts 3 months, from August to October.

Climate data for Vila-seca (1971–2000) (14 km (8.70 mi) south-west of Tarragona
Month	Jan	Feb	Mar	Apr	May	Jun	Jul	Aug	Sep	Oct	Nov	Dec	Year
Record high °C (°F)	20.8 (69.4)	24.0 (75.2)	28.2 (82.8)	29.1 (84.4)	30.6 (87.1)	31.3 (88.3)	34.5 (94.1)	35.2 (95.4)	33.3 (91.9)	30.7 (87.3)	25.5 (77.9)	25.0 (77.0)	35.2 (95.4)
Mean daily maximum °C (°F)	12.4 (54.3)	15.2 (59.4)	17.8 (64.0)	19.5 (67.1)	22.1 (71.8)	25.6 (78.1)	29.3 (84.7)	30.2 (86.4)	27.6 (81.7)	22.4 (72.3)	16.4 (61.5)	12.7 (54.9)	21.0 (69.8)
Daily mean °C (°F)	10.0 (50.0)	11.9 (53.4)	14.1 (57.4)	15.9 (60.6)	18.8 (65.8)	22.5 (72.5)	25.9 (78.6)	26.7 (80.1)	24.0 (75.2)	19.1 (66.4)	13.9 (57.0)	10.7 (51.3)	17.8 (64.0)
Mean daily minimum °C (°F)	7.5 (45.5)	8.7 (47.7)	10.4 (50.7)	12.2 (54.0)	15.5 (59.9)	19.4 (66.9)	22.5 (72.5)	23.2 (73.8)	20.3 (68.5)	15.8 (60.4)	11.3 (52.3)	8.7 (47.7)	14.7 (58.5)
Record low °C (°F)	−1.6 (29.1)	−1.0 (30.2)	0.6 (33.1)	4.5 (40.1)	9.0 (48.2)	12.6 (54.7)	16.0 (60.8)	14.3 (57.7)	13.0 (55.4)	7.3 (45.1)	2.7 (36.9)	−1.0 (30.2)	−1.6 (29.1)
Average precipitation mm (inches)	37.2 (1.46)	19.1 (0.75)	36.6 (1.44)	38.2 (1.50)	53.2 (2.09)	33.3 (1.31)	15.7 (0.62)	52.8 (2.08)	68.2 (2.69)	63.7 (2.51)	46.9 (1.85)	44.7 (1.76)	509.0 (20.04)
Average precipitation days (≥ 1 mm)	5.0	3.5	4.8	5.8	6.1	3.9	2.7	4.3	4.8	5.8	5.0	5.1	56.8
Source: Servei Meteorològic de Catalunya

== Tourism ==
In recent years the municipality has become popular with tourists, as La Pineda has experienced a revitalisation to include an improved choice of hotels, an updated beachfront, while including an array of attractions such as the aquopolis water park with dolphin and sea lion exhibitions and the nightlife hotspot, Pacha.

The area is served by Reus Airport, which operates many low cost and charter flights to destinations around Europe and North Africa. Barcelona Airport also serves the area.

== Gallery ==
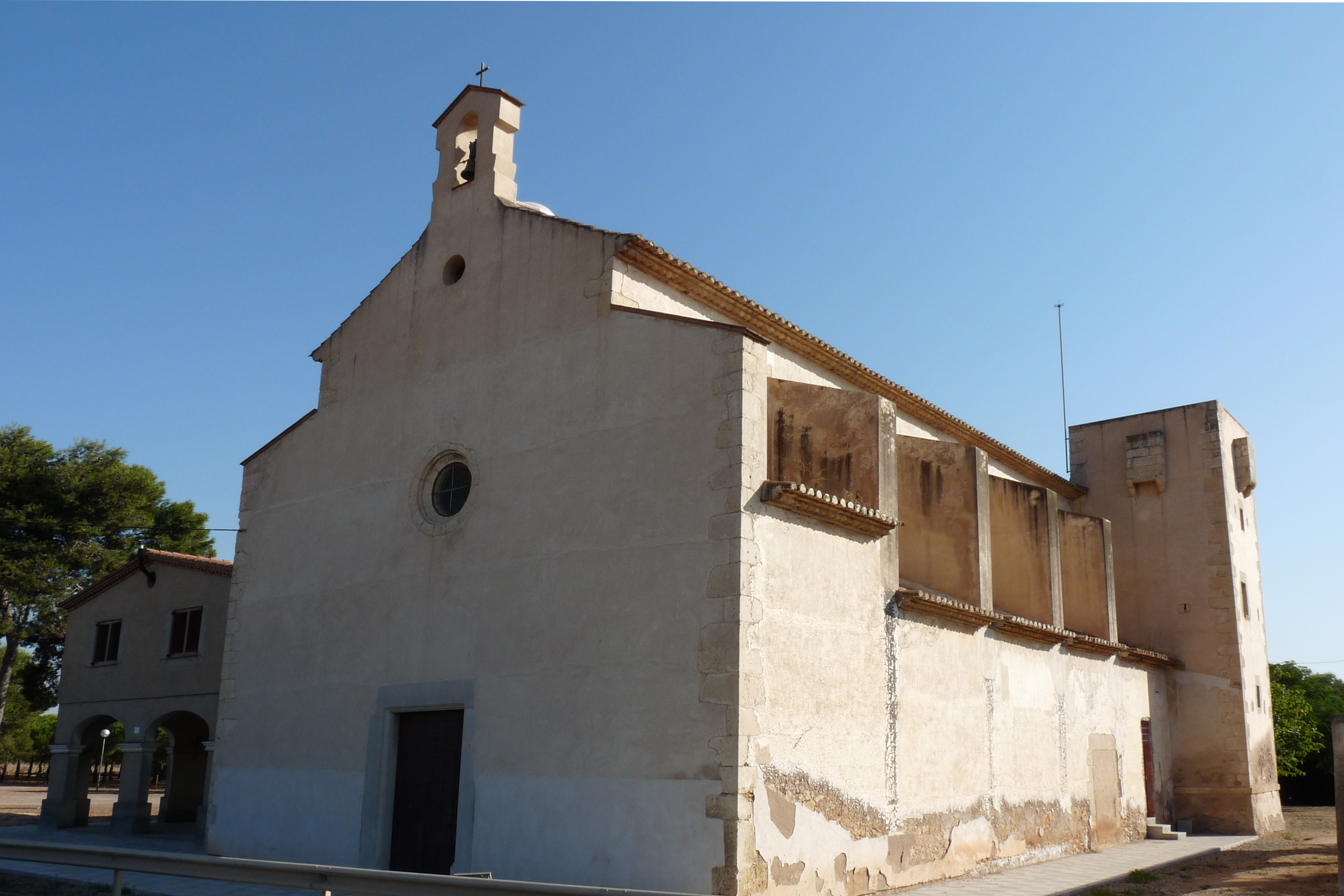
La Pineda sanctuary

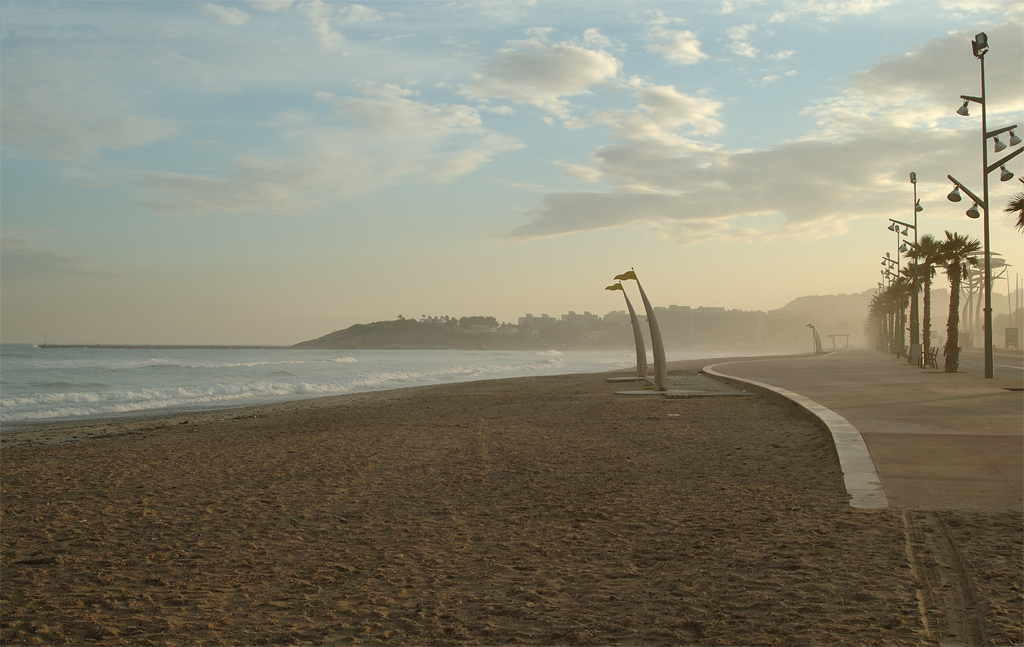
La Pineda beach
