= Crexell =

Crexell is a surname of Argentine origin.

== People with the surname ==
- Carmen Lucila Crexell (born 1972), Argentine politician
- Rodrigo Crexell (born 1968), Argentine rugby player

== See also ==
- Creixell
