= Municipalities of Catalonia =

Catalonia, with its municipalities, comarques, and provinces

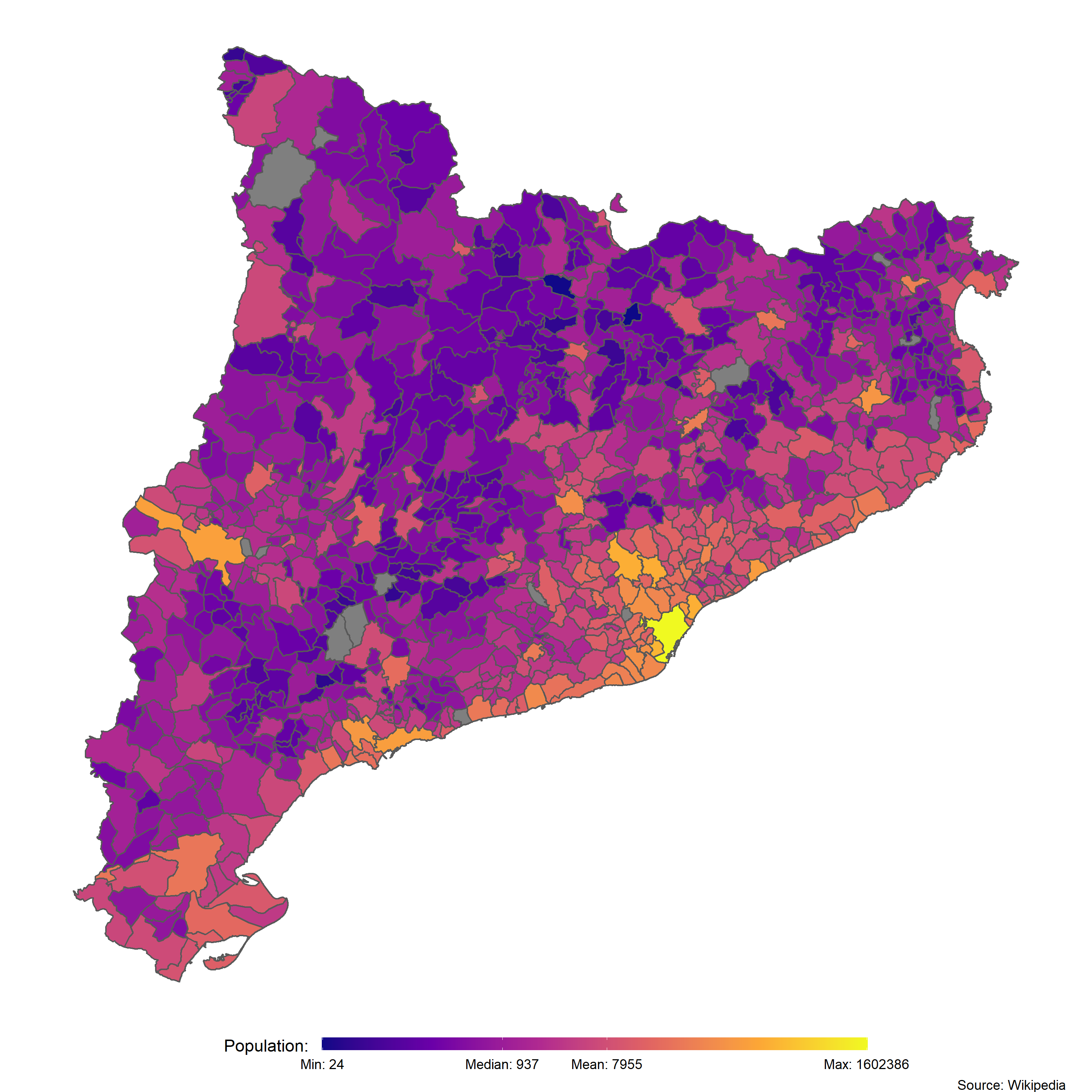
Population map of Catalonia by municipality

Catalonia is (as of 2018) divided into 947 municipalities.

Each municipality typically represents one significant urban settlement, of any size from village to city, with its surrounding land. This is not always the case, though. Many municipalities have merged as a result of rural depopulation or simply for greater efficiency. Some large urban areas, for example Barcelona, consist of more than one municipality, each of which previously held a separate settlement. The Catalan government encourages mergers of very small municipalities; its "Report on the revision of Catalonia's territorial organisation model" (the "Roca Report"), published in 2000 but not yet implemented, recommends many such mergers.

Larger municipalities may sometimes grant the status of decentralised municipal entity (Catalan: EMD, Spanish: EATIM) to one or more of its settlements, for more effective provision of services or to substitute for its previous status as a separate municipality.

Each municipality is run by a council elected by the residents at periodic nationwide local elections. The council consists of a number of members depending on population, who elect the mayor (Spanish: alcalde, Catalan: batlle). The town hall (Catalan: ajuntament) is located in the main settlement, and deals with provision of local services and administrative matters such as registration of residents. The "main settlement" is not always the biggest settlement, as new urban developments such as tourist resorts can become very big very quickly without achieving any political recognition.

Boundaries between municipalities have their origins in ancient landholdings and transfers, and may often appear quite arbitrary and illogical, with exclaves common.

Catalonia's municipalities are (as of 1987) grouped into 42 comarques (by the Catalan government) and four provinces (by the Spanish government). Occasional revisions of the boundaries of comarcas have resulted in municipalities moving from one comarca to another; see the list at Comarques of Catalonia.

== List of municipalities ==
The official names in Catalan are the only legal ones (except in the Val d'Aran). Older texts may use Spanish forms or spellings.

Municipality	Comarca	Province	Population (2014)	Area (km^{2})	Density	No. of EMDs
Abella de la Conca	Pallars Jussà	Lleida	170	78.3	2.2	
Abrera	Baix Llobregat	Barcelona	12,125	19.9	609.3	
Àger	Noguera	Lleida	594	160.6	3.7	
Agramunt	Urgell	Lleida	5,515	79.6	69.3	
Aguilar de Segarra	Bages	Barcelona	251	43.3	5.8	
Agullana	Alt Empordà	Girona	826	27.7	29.8	
Aiguafreda	Vallès Oriental	Barcelona	2,498	7.9	316.2	
Aiguamúrcia	Alt Camp	Tarragona	909	73.0	12.5	
Aiguaviva	Gironès	Girona	783	13.9	56.3	
Aitona	Segrià	Lleida	2,415	66.9	36.1	
Els Alamús	Segrià	Lleida	769	20.5	37.5	
Alàs i Cerc	Alt Urgell	Lleida	356	57.7	6.2	
L'Albagés	Garrigues	Lleida	419	25.7	16.3	
Albanyà	Alt Empordà	Girona	155	94.4	1.6	
Albatàrrec	Segrià	Lleida	2,139	10.5	203.7	
Albesa	Noguera	Lleida	1,608	37.6	42.8	
L'Albi	Garrigues	Lleida	834	32.5	25.7	
Albinyana	Baix Penedès	Tarragona	2,335	19.4	120.4	
L'Albiol	Baix Camp	Tarragona	458	20.3	22.6	
Albons	Baix Empordà	Girona	727	11.1	65.5	
Alcanar	Montsià	Tarragona	9,637	47.1	204.6	
Alcanó	Segrià	Lleida	242	21.0	11.5	
Alcarràs	Segrià	Lleida	9,252	114.3	80.9	
Alcoletge	Segrià	Lleida	3,270	16.7	195.8	
Alcover	Alt Camp	Tarragona	5,131	46.0	111.5	
L'Aldea	Baix Ebre	Tarragona	4,376	35.2	124.3	
Aldover	Baix Ebre	Tarragona	940	20.2	46.5	
L'Aleixar	Baix Camp	Tarragona	891	26.1	34.1	
Alella	Maresme	Barcelona	9,651	9.6	1,005.3	
Alfara de Carles	Baix Ebre	Tarragona	395	63.9	6.2	
Alfarràs	Segrià	Lleida	3,003	11.4	263.4	
Alfés	Segrià	Lleida	315	31.9	9.9	
Alforja	Baix Camp	Tarragona	1,859	38.2	48.7	
Algerri	Noguera	Lleida	423	54.3	7.8	
Alguaire	Segrià	Lleida	3,093	50.1	61.7	
Alins	Pallars Sobirà	Lleida	286	183.2	1.6	3
Alió	Alt Camp	Tarragona	432	7.2	60.0	
Almacelles	Segrià	Lleida	6,699	49.0	136.7	
Almatret	Segrià	Lleida	333	56.8	5.9	
Almenar	Segrià	Lleida	3,547	66.6	53.3	
Almoster	Baix Camp	Tarragona	1,396	6.0	232.7	
Alòs de Balaguer	Noguera	Lleida	126	69.1	1.8	
Alp	Cerdanya	Girona	1,661	44.3	37.5	
Alpens	Osona	Barcelona	300	13.8	21.7	
Alpicat	Segrià	Lleida	6,297	15.3	411.6	
Alt Àneu	Pallars Sobirà	Lleida	416	217.8	1.9	2
Altafulla	Tarragonès	Tarragona	4,988	7.0	712.6	
Amer	Selva	Girona	2,281	40.1	56.9	
L'Ametlla de Mar	Baix Ebre	Tarragona	7,303	66.9	109.2	
L'Ametlla del Vallès	Vallès Oriental	Barcelona	8,283	14.2	583.3	
L'Ampolla	Baix Ebre	Tarragona	3,479	35.6	97.7	
Amposta	Montsià	Tarragona	21,197	138.3	153.3	
Anglès	Selva	Girona	5,606	16.3	343.9	
Anglesola	Urgell	Lleida	1,360	23.5	57.9	
Arbeca	Garrigues	Lleida	2,389	58.3	41.0	
L'Arboç	Baix Penedès	Tarragona	5,515	14.1	391.1	
Arbolí	Baix Camp	Tarragona	105	20.8	5.0	
Arbúcies	Selva	Girona	6,481	86.2	75.2	
Arenys de Mar	Maresme	Barcelona	15,307	6.8	2,251.0	
Arenys de Munt	Maresme	Barcelona	8,654	21.3	406.3	
Argelaguer	Garrotxa	Girona	425	12.5	34.0	
Argençola	Anoia	Barcelona	212	47.1	4.5	
L'Argentera	Baix Camp	Tarragona	146	10.1	14.5	
Argentona	Maresme	Barcelona	11,963	25.4	471.0	
L'Armentera	Alt Empordà	Girona	901	5.6	160.9	
Arnes	Terra Alta	Tarragona	474	43.0	11.0	
Arres	Val d'Aran	Lleida	73	11.6	6.3	
Arsèguel	Alt Urgell	Lleida	81	10.6	7.6	
Artés	Bages	Barcelona	5,661	17.9	316.3	
Artesa de Lleida	Segrià	Lleida	1,508	23.9	63.1	
Artesa de Segre	Noguera	Lleida	3,656	175.9	20.8	1
Ascó	Ribera d'Ebre	Tarragona	1,654	73.6	22.5	
Aspa	Segrià	Lleida	215	10.2	21.1	
Les Avellanes i Santa Linya	Noguera	Lleida	479	103.0	4.7	
Avià	Berguedà	Barcelona	2,258	27.2	83.0	
Avinyó	Bages	Barcelona	2,275	63.2	36.0	
Avinyonet de Puigventós	Alt Empordà	Girona	1,581	12.3	128.5	
Avinyonet del Penedès	Alt Penedès	Barcelona	1,675	29.1	57.6	
Badalona	Barcelonès	Barcelona	217,210	21.2	10,245.8	
Badia del Vallès	Vallès Occidental	Barcelona	13,553	0.9	15,058.9	
Bagà	Berguedà	Barcelona	2,225	43.1	51.6	
Baix Pallars	Pallars Sobirà	Lleida	361	129.4	2.8	1
Balaguer	Noguera	Lleida	16,485	57.3	287.7	
Balenyà	Osona	Barcelona	3,724	17.4	214.0	
Balsareny	Bages	Barcelona	3,343	36.9	90.6	
Banyeres del Penedès	Baix Penedès	Tarragona	3,057	12.2	250.6	
Banyoles	Pla de l'Estany	Girona	19,343	11.0	1,758.5	
Barbens	Pla d'Urgell	Lleida	875	7.6	115.1	
Barberà de la Conca	Conca de Barberà	Tarragona	519	26.6	19.5	
Barberà del Vallès	Vallès Occidental	Barcelona	32,550	8.3	3,921.7	
Barcelona	Barcelonès	Barcelona	1,602,386	101.4	15,802.6	
La Baronia de Rialb	Noguera	Lleida	235	145.1	1.6	
Bàscara	Alt Empordà	Girona	949	17.5	54.2	
Bassella	Alt Urgell	Lleida	244	70.2	3.5	
Batea	Terra Alta	Tarragona	1,975	128.4	15.4	
Bausen	Val d'Aran	Lleida	49	17.7	2.8	
Begues	Baix Llobregat	Barcelona	6,620	50.4	131.3	
Begur	Baix Empordà	Girona	3,994	20.7	192.9	
Belianes	Urgell	Lleida	555	15.7	35.4	
Bell-lloc d'Urgell	Pla d'Urgell	Lleida	2,351	34.9	67.4	
Bellaguarda	Garrigues	Lleida	307	17.1	18.0	
Bellcaire d'Empordà	Baix Empordà	Girona	650	12.6	51.6	
Bellcaire d'Urgell	Noguera	Lleida	1,305	31.4	41.6	
Bellmunt d'Urgell	Noguera	Lleida	192	5.1	37.6	
Bellmunt del Priorat	Priorat	Tarragona	307	8.9	34.5	
Bellprat	Anoia	Barcelona	78	31.0	2.5	
Bellpuig	Urgell	Lleida	4,956	35.0	141.6	1
Bellvei	Baix Penedès	Tarragona	2,174	8.3	261.9	
Bellver de Cerdanya	Cerdanya	Lleida	2,075	98.2	21.1	1
Bellvís	Pla d'Urgell	Lleida	2,342	46.7	50.1	
Benavent de Segrià	Segrià	Lleida	1,516	7.4	204.9	
Benifallet	Baix Ebre	Tarragona	703	62.4	11.3	
Benissanet	Ribera d'Ebre	Tarragona	1,247	23.1	54.0	
Berga	Berguedà	Barcelona	16,456	22.6	728.1	
Besalú	Garrotxa	Girona	2,400	4.9	489.8	
Bescanó	Gironès	Girona	4,874	35.9	135.8	
Beuda	Garrotxa	Girona	200	35.9	5.6	
Bigues i Riells	Vallès Oriental	Barcelona	8,854	28.6	309.6	
Biosca	Segarra	Lleida	197	66.2	3.0	
La Bisbal d'Empordà	Baix Empordà	Girona	10,761	20.6	522.4	
La Bisbal de Montsant	Priorat	Tarragona	216	14.1	15.3	
La Bisbal del Penedès	Baix Penedès	Tarragona	3,495	32.5	107.5	
Biure	Alt Empordà	Girona	245	10.0	24.5	
Blancafort	Conca de Barberà	Tarragona	413	14.5	28.5	
Blanes	Selva	Girona	39,293	17.7	2,219.9	
Boadella i les Escaules	Alt Empordà	Girona	248	10.8	23.0	
Bolvir	Cerdanya	Girona	373	10.3	36.2	
Bonastre	Baix Penedès	Tarragona	622	25.0	24.9	
Es Bòrdes	Val d'Aran	Lleida	234	21.4	10.9	1
Bordils	Gironès	Girona	1,690	7.3	231.5	
Les Borges Blanques	Garrigues	Lleida	6,088	61.6	98.8	
Les Borges del Camp	Baix Camp	Tarragona	2,077	8.2	253.3	
Borrassà	Alt Empordà	Girona	728	9.4	77.4	
Borredà	Berguedà	Barcelona	540	43.4	12.4	
Bossòst	Val d'Aran	Lleida	1,140	28.2	40.4	
Bot	Terra Alta	Tarragona	630	34.9	18.1	
Botarell	Baix Camp	Tarragona	1,100	12.0	91.7	
Bovera	Garrigues	Lleida	290	31.1	9.3	
Bràfim	Alt Camp	Tarragona	660	6.4	103.1	
Breda	Selva	Girona	3,751	5.0	750.2	
El Bruc	Anoia	Barcelona	1,991	47.2	42.2	
El Brull	Osona	Barcelona	263	41.0	6.4	
Brunyola	Selva	Girona	391	36.8	10.6	
Cabacés	Priorat	Tarragona	326	31.3	10.4	
Cabanabona	Noguera	Lleida	88	14.2	6.2	
Cabanelles	Alt Empordà	Girona	243	55.6	4.4	
Cabanes	Alt Empordà	Girona	921	15.0	61.4	
Les Cabanyes	Alt Penedès	Barcelona	961	1.2	800.8	
Cabó	Alt Urgell	Lleida	98	80.3	1.2	
Cabra del Camp	Alt Camp	Tarragona	1,115	27.0	41.3	
Cabrera d'Anoia	Anoia	Barcelona	1,363	17.0	80.2	
Cabrera de Mar	Maresme	Barcelona	4,525	9.0	502.8	
Cabrils	Maresme	Barcelona	7,197	7.0	1,028.1	
Cadaqués	Alt Empordà	Girona	2,820	26.4	106.8	
Calaf	Anoia	Barcelona	3,475	9.2	377.7	
Calafell	Baix Penedès	Tarragona	24,333	20.4	1,192.8	
Calders	Moianès	Barcelona	949	33.1	28.7	
Caldes d'Estrac	Maresme	Barcelona	2,738	0.9	3,042.2	
Caldes de Malavella	Selva	Girona	7,130	57.3	124.4	
Caldes de Montbui	Vallès Oriental	Barcelona	17,156	37.4	458.7	
Calella	Maresme	Barcelona	18,307	8.0	2,288.4	
Calldetenes	Osona	Barcelona	2,429	5.8	418.8	
Callús	Bages	Barcelona	1,985	12.5	158.8	
Calonge	Baix Empordà	Girona	10,541	33.6	313.7	
Calonge de Segarra	Anoia	Barcelona	202	37.2	5.4	
Camarasa	Noguera	Lleida	911	157.1	5.8	1
Camarles	Baix Ebre	Tarragona	3,514	25.2	139.4	
Cambrils	Baix Camp	Tarragona	33,301	35.2	946.1	
Camós	Pla de l'Estany	Girona	686	15.7	43.7	
Campdevànol	Ripollès	Girona	3,395	32.6	104.1	
Campelles	Ripollès	Girona	132	18.6	7.1	
Campins	Vallès Oriental	Barcelona	521	7.3	71.4	
Campllong	Gironès	Girona	515	8.6	59.9	
Camprodon	Ripollès	Girona	2,359	103.4	22.8	
Canejan	Val d'Aran	Lleida	102	48.3	2.1	
Canet d'Adri	Gironès	Girona	644	44.4	14.5	
Canet de Mar	Maresme	Barcelona	14,123	5.6	2,522.0	
La Canonja	Tarragonès	Tarragona	5,807	7.3	795.5	
Canovelles	Vallès Oriental	Barcelona	15,954	6.7	2,381.2	
Cànoves i Samalús	Vallès Oriental	Barcelona	2,863	29.2	98.0	
Cantallops	Alt Empordà	Girona	324	19.6	16.5	
Canyelles	Garraf	Barcelona	4,345	14.2	306.0	
Capafonts	Baix Camp	Tarragona	114	13.4	8.5	
Capçanes	Priorat	Tarragona	411	22.5	18.3	
Capellades	Anoia	Barcelona	5,284	2.9	1,822.1	
Capmany	Alt Empordà	Girona	612	26.4	23.2	
Capolat	Berguedà	Barcelona	88	34.1	2.6	
Cardedeu	Vallès Oriental	Barcelona	17,698	12.1	1,462.6	
Cardona	Bages	Barcelona	4,921	66.7	73.8	
Carme	Anoia	Barcelona	817	11.7	69.8	
Caseres	Terra Alta	Tarragona	267	42.9	6.2	
Cassà de la Selva	Gironès	Girona	9,922	45.2	219.5	
Casserres	Berguedà	Barcelona	1,569	29.5	53.2	
Castell de l'Areny	Berguedà	Barcelona	75	24.4	3.1	
Castell de Mur	Pallars Jussà	Lleida	163	62.4	2.6	
Castell-Platja d'Aro	Baix Empordà	Girona	10,721	21.8	491.8	
Castellar de la Ribera	Solsonès	Lleida	149	60.2	2.5	
Castellar de n'Hug	Berguedà	Barcelona	159	47.1	3.4	
Castellar del Riu	Berguedà	Barcelona	171	32.7	5.2	
Castellar del Vallès	Vallès Occidental	Barcelona	23,440	44.9	522.0	
Castellbell i el Vilar	Bages	Barcelona	3,624	28.5	127.2	
Castellbisbal	Vallès Occidental	Barcelona	12,434	31.0	401.1	
Castellcir	Moianès	Barcelona	718	34.2	21.0	
Castelldans	Garrigues	Lleida	976	65.1	15.0	
Castelldefels	Baix Llobregat	Barcelona	63,255	12.9	4,903.5	
Castellet i la Gornal	Alt Penedès	Barcelona	2,237	47.5	47.1	
Castellfollit de la Roca	Garrotxa	Girona	1,013	0.7	1,447.1	
Castellfollit de Riubregós	Anoia	Barcelona	177	26.2	6.8	
Castellfollit del Boix	Bages	Barcelona	428	58.9	7.3	
Castellgalí	Bages	Barcelona	2,022	17.2	117.6	
Castellnou de Bages	Bages	Barcelona	1,241	29.2	42.5	
Castellnou de Seana	Pla d'Urgell	Lleida	740	16.1	46.0	
Castelló d'Empúries	Alt Empordà	Girona	11,473	42.3	271.2	
Castelló de Farfanya	Noguera	Lleida	565	52.6	10.7	
Castellolí	Anoia	Barcelona	571	25.3	22.6	
Castellserà	Urgell	Lleida	1,083	15.8	68.5	
Castellterçol	Moianès	Barcelona	2,400	31.9	75.2	
Castellvell del Camp	Baix Camp	Tarragona	2,869	5.2	551.7	
Castellví de la Marca	Alt Penedès	Barcelona	1,589	28.4	56.0	
Castellví de Rosanes	Baix Llobregat	Barcelona	1,760	16.4	107.3	
El Catllar	Tarragonès	Tarragona	4,222	26.4	159.9	
Cava	Alt Urgell	Lleida	60	42.2	1.4	
La Cellera de Ter	Selva	Girona	2,071	14.6	141.8	
Celrà	Gironès	Girona	5,053	19.5	259.1	
Centelles	Osona	Barcelona	7,333	15.2	482.4	
Cercs	Berguedà	Barcelona	1,246	47.4	26.3	
Cerdanyola del Vallès	Vallès Occidental	Barcelona	57,402	30.6	1,875.9	1
Cervelló	Baix Llobregat	Barcelona	8,811	24.1	365.6	
Cervera	Segarra	Lleida	9,039	55.2	163.8	
Cervià de les Garrigues	Garrigues	Lleida	708	34.2	20.7	
Cervià de Ter	Gironès	Girona	934	9.9	94.3	
Cistella	Alt Empordà	Girona	293	25.6	11.4	
Ciutadilla	Urgell	Lleida	209	17.0	12.3	
Clariana de Cardener	Solsonès	Lleida	140	40.8	3.4	
El Cogul	Garrigues	Lleida	190	17.5	10.9	
Colera	Alt Empordà	Girona	532	24.4	21.8	
Coll de Nargó	Alt Urgell	Lleida	587	151.4	3.9	
Collbató	Baix Llobregat	Barcelona	4,427	18.1	244.6	
Colldejou	Baix Camp	Tarragona	172	14.5	11.9	
Collsuspina	Moianès	Barcelona	338	15.1	22.4	
Colomers	Baix Empordà	Girona	195	4.4	44.3	
La Coma i la Pedra	Solsonès	Lleida	269	60.6	4.4	
Conca de Dalt	Pallars Jussà	Lleida	443	166.5	2.7	1
Conesa	Conca de Barberà	Tarragona	122	29.0	4.2	
Constantí	Tarragonès	Tarragona	6,539	30.9	211.6	
Copons	Anoia	Barcelona	323	18.7	17.3	
Corbera d'Ebre	Terra Alta	Tarragona	1,136	53.1	21.4	
Corbera de Llobregat	Baix Llobregat	Barcelona	14,237	18.4	773.8	
Corbins	Segrià	Lleida	1,400	21.0	66.7	
Corçà	Baix Empordà	Girona	1,257	16.3	77.1	
Cornellà de Llobregat	Baix Llobregat	Barcelona	86,234	7.0	12,319.1	
Cornellà del Terri	Pla de l'Estany	Girona	2,235	27.7	80.7	
Cornudella de Montsant	Priorat	Tarragona	954	63.5	15.0	
Creixell	Tarragonès	Tarragona	3,480	10.5	331.4	
Crespià	Pla de l'Estany	Girona	245	11.4	21.5	
Cruïlles, Monells i Sant Sadurní de l'Heura	Baix Empordà	Girona	1,284	99.8	12.9	
Cubelles	Garraf	Barcelona	14,481	13.5	1,072.7	
Cubells	Noguera	Lleida	395	39.2	10.1	
Cunit	Baix Penedès	Tarragona	11,989	9.7	1,236.0	
Darnius	Alt Empordà	Girona	534	34.9	15.3	
Das	Cerdanya	Girona	220	14.6	15.1	
Deltebre	Baix Ebre	Tarragona	11,831	107.4	110.2	
Dosrius	Maresme	Barcelona	5,137	40.7	126.2	
Duesaigües	Baix Camp	Tarragona	239	13.6	17.6	
L'Escala	Alt Empordà	Girona	10,143	16.3	622.3	
Esparreguera	Baix Llobregat	Barcelona	21,685	27.4	791.4	
Espinelves	Osona	Girona	196	17.4	11.3	
L'Espluga Calba	Garrigues	Lleida	395	21.5	18.4	
L'Espluga de Francolí	Conca de Barberà	Tarragona	3,836	57.0	67.3	
Esplugues de Llobregat	Baix Llobregat	Barcelona	46,133	4.6	10,028.9	
Espolla	Alt Empordà	Girona	417	43.6	9.6	
Esponellà	Pla de l'Estany	Girona	458	16.1	28.4	
Espot	Pallars Sobirà	Lleida	357	97.3	3.7	
L'Espunyola	Berguedà	Barcelona	259	35.5	7.3	
L'Esquirol	Osona	Barcelona	2,188	61.8	35.4	
Estamariu	Alt Urgell	Lleida	119	21.2	5.6	
L'Estany	Moianès	Barcelona	407	10.2	39.9	
Estaràs	Segarra	Lleida	176	21.0	8.4	
Esterri d'Àneu	Pallars Sobirà	Lleida	866	8.5	101.9	
Esterri de Cardós	Pallars Sobirà	Lleida	72	16.6	4.3	
Falset	Priorat	Tarragona	2,838	31.6	89.8	
El Far d'Empordà	Alt Empordà	Girona	563	9.0	62.6	
Farrera	Pallars Sobirà	Lleida	125	61.9	2.0	
La Fatarella	Terra Alta	Tarragona	1,051	56.5	18.6	
La Febró	Baix Camp	Tarragona	40	16.1	2.5	
Figaró-Montmany	Vallès Oriental	Barcelona	1,096	15.0	73.1	
Fígols	Berguedà	Barcelona	43	29.3	1.5	
Fígols i Alinyà	Alt Urgell	Lleida	260	101.8	2.6	
La Figuera	Priorat	Tarragona	118	18.7	6.3	
Figueres	Alt Empordà	Girona	45,444	19.3	2,354.6	
Figuerola del Camp	Alt Camp	Tarragona	345	22.7	15.2	
Flaçà	Gironès	Girona	1,041	6.5	160.2	
Flix	Ribera d'Ebre	Tarragona	3,795	116.9	32.5	
La Floresta	Garrigues	Lleida	162	5.5	29.5	
Fogars de la Selva	Selva	Barcelona	1,512	32.1	47.1	
Fogars de Montclús	Vallès Oriental	Barcelona	482	39.7	12.1	
Foixà	Baix Empordà	Girona	320	18.8	17.0	
Folgueroles	Osona	Barcelona	2,259	10.5	215.1	
Fondarella	Pla d'Urgell	Lleida	838	5.4	155.2	
Fonollosa	Bages	Barcelona	1,429	51.7	27.6	
Font-rubí	Alt Penedès	Barcelona	1,353	37.4	36.2	
Fontanals de Cerdanya	Cerdanya	Girona	443	28.6	15.5	
Fontanilles	Baix Empordà	Girona	160	9.3	17.2	
Fontcoberta	Pla de l'Estany	Girona	1,442	17.3	83.4	
Foradada	Noguera	Lleida	182	28.6	6.4	
Forallac	Baix Empordà	Girona	1,729	50.6	34.2	
Forès	Conca de Barberà	Tarragona	46	16.0	2.9	
Fornells de la Selva	Gironès	Girona	2,479	11.9	208.3	
Fortià	Alt Empordà	Girona	710	10.8	65.7	
Les Franqueses del Vallès	Vallès Oriental	Barcelona	19,170	29.1	658.8	
Freginals	Montsià	Tarragona	405	17.6	23.0	
La Fuliola	Urgell	Lleida	1,294	11.0	117.6	
Fulleda	Garrigues	Lleida	98	16.2	6.0	
Gaià	Bages	Barcelona	163	39.5	4.1	
La Galera	Montsià	Tarragona	800	27.5	29.1	
Gallifa	Vallès Occidental	Barcelona	202	16.3	12.4	
Gandesa	Terra Alta	Tarragona	3,091	71.2	43.4	
Garcia	Ribera d'Ebre	Tarragona	559	52.4	10.7	
Els Garidells	Alt Camp	Tarragona	182	3.1	58.7	
La Garriga	Vallès Oriental	Barcelona	15,762	18.8	838.4	
Garrigàs	Alt Empordà	Girona	398	19.9	20.0	
Garrigoles	Baix Empordà	Girona	159	9.4	16.9	
Garriguella	Alt Empordà	Girona	857	21.0	40.8	
Gavà	Baix Llobregat	Barcelona	46,326	30.8	1,504.1	
Gavet de la Conca	Pallars Jussà	Lleida	303	90.9	3.3	
Gelida	Alt Penedès	Barcelona	7,194	26.7	269.4	
Ger	Cerdanya	Girona	432	33.4	12.9	
Gimenells i el Pla de la Font	Segrià	Lleida	1,129	55.8	20.2	1
Ginestar	Ribera d'Ebre	Tarragona	819	15.8	51.8	
Girona	Gironès	Girona	97,227	39.1	2,486.6	
Gironella	Berguedà	Barcelona	4,987	6.8	733.4	
Gisclareny	Berguedà	Barcelona	25	36.5	0.7	
Godall	Montsià	Tarragona	673	33.6	20.0	
Golmés	Pla d'Urgell	Lleida	1,734	16.6	104.5	
Gombrèn	Ripollès	Girona	195	43.3	4.5	
Gósol	Berguedà	Lleida	216	56.3	3.8	
La Granada	Alt Penedès	Barcelona	2,073	6.5	318.9	
La Granadella	Garrigues	Lleida	715	88.7	8.1	
Granera	Moianès	Barcelona	80	23.7	3.4	
La Granja d'Escarp	Segrià	Lleida	972	38.5	25.2	
Granollers	Vallès Oriental	Barcelona	59,930	14.9	4,022.1	
Granyanella	Segarra	Lleida	147	24.4	6.0	
Granyena de les Garrigues	Garrigues	Lleida	162	20.5	7.9	
Granyena de Segarra	Segarra	Lleida	136	16.3	8.3	
Gratallops	Priorat	Tarragona	243	13.5	18.0	
Gualba	Vallès Oriental	Barcelona	1,429	23.3	61.3	
Gualta	Baix Empordà	Girona	362	9.0	40.2	
Guardiola de Berguedà	Berguedà	Barcelona	937	61.7	15.2	
Els Guiamets	Priorat	Tarragona	292	12.1	24.1	
Guils de Cerdanya	Cerdanya	Girona	536	22.0	24.4	
Guimerà	Urgell	Lleida	295	25.8	11.4	
La Guingueta d'Àneu	Pallars Sobirà	Lleida	317	108.4	2.9	
Guissona	Segarra	Lleida	6,827	18.1	377.2	
Guixers	Solsonès	Lleida	128	66.4	1.9	
Gurb	Osona	Barcelona	2,545	51.6	49.3	
Horta de Sant Joan	Terra Alta	Tarragona	1,219	119.0	10.2	
L'Hospitalet de Llobregat	Barcelonès	Barcelona	253,518	12.4	20,445.0	
Els Hostalets de Pierola	Anoia	Barcelona	2,942	33.5	87.8	
Hostalric	Selva	Girona	4,010	3.4	1,179.4	
Igualada	Anoia	Barcelona	38,751	8.1	4,784.1	
Isona i Conca Dellà	Pallars Jussà	Lleida	1,049	139.4	7.5	
Isòvol	Cerdanya	Girona	301	10.8	27.9	
Ivars d'Urgell	Pla d'Urgell	Lleida	1,607	24.3	66.1	
Ivars de Noguera	Noguera	Lleida	350	27.1	12.9	
Ivorra	Segarra	Lleida	115	15.4	7.5	
Jafre	Baix Empordà	Girona	396	6.6	60.0	
La Jonquera	Alt Empordà	Girona	3,115	56.9	54.7	
Jorba	Anoia	Barcelona	838	30.9	27.1	
Josa i Tuixén	Alt Urgell	Lleida	128	68.2	1.9	1
Juià	Gironès	Girona	340	8.4	40.5	
Juncosa	Garrigues	Lleida	438	76.5	5.7	
Juneda	Garrigues	Lleida	3,497	47.3	73.9	
Les	Val d'Aran	Lleida	968	23.4	41.4	
Linyola	Pla d'Urgell	Lleida	2,677	28.7	93.3	
La Llacuna	Anoia	Barcelona	906	52.2	17.4	
Lladó	Alt Empordà	Girona	767	13.5	56.8	
Lladorre	Pallars Sobirà	Lleida	232	147.0	1.6	
Lladurs	Solsonès	Lleida	195	128.0	1.5	
La Llagosta	Vallès Oriental	Barcelona	13,430	3.0	4,476.7	
Llagostera	Gironès	Girona	8,198	76.4	107.3	
Llambilles	Gironès	Girona	738	14.6	50.5	
Llanars	Ripollès	Girona	509	24.7	20.6	
Llançà	Alt Empordà	Girona	4,970	28.0	177.5	
Llardecans	Segrià	Lleida	497	66.0	7.5	
Llavorsí	Pallars Sobirà	Lleida	367	68.5	5.4	3
Lleida	Segrià	Lleida	139,176	212.3	655.6	2
Llers	Alt Empordà	Girona	1,242	21.3	58.3	
Lles de Cerdanya	Cerdanya	Lleida	260	102.8	2.5	1
Lliçà d'Amunt	Vallès Oriental	Barcelona	14,696	22.3	659.0	
Lliçà de Vall	Vallès Oriental	Barcelona	6,354	10.8	588.3	
Llimiana	Pallars Jussà	Lleida	159	41.7	3.8	
Llinars del Vallès	Vallès Oriental	Barcelona	9,536	27.6	345.5	
Llívia	Cerdanya	Girona	1,536	12.9	119.1	
El Lloar	Priorat	Tarragona	110	6.6	16.7	
Llobera	Solsonès	Lleida	201	39.2	5.1	
Llorac	Conca de Barberà	Tarragona	112	23.3	4.8	
Llorenç del Penedès	Baix Penedès	Tarragona	2,306	4.6	501.3	
Lloret de Mar	Selva	Girona	38,624	48.7	793.1	
Les Llosses	Ripollès	Girona	211	114.0	1.9	
Lluçà	Osona	Barcelona	257	53.0	4.8	
Maçanet de Cabrenys	Alt Empordà	Girona	781	67.9	11.5	
Maçanet de la Selva	Selva	Girona	6,963	45.6	152.7	
Madremanya	Gironès	Girona	283	13.7	20.7	
Maià de Montcal	Garrotxa	Girona	443	17.3	25.6	
Maials	Segrià	Lleida	959	57.1	16.8	
Maldà	Urgell	Lleida	227	31.4	7.2	
Malgrat de Mar	Maresme	Barcelona	18,417	8.8	2,092.8	
Malla	Osona	Barcelona	266	11.0	24.2	
Manlleu	Osona	Barcelona	20,279	17.2	1,179.0	
Manresa	Bages	Barcelona	75,297	41.6	1,810.0	
Marçà	Priorat	Tarragona	611	16.1	38.0	
Margalef	Priorat	Tarragona	108	34.7	3.1	
Marganell	Bages	Barcelona	297	13.5	22.0	
Martorell	Baix Llobregat	Barcelona	27,895	12.8	2,179.3	
Martorelles	Vallès Oriental	Barcelona	4,783	3.6	1,328.6	
Mas de Barberans	Montsià	Tarragona	619	78.8	7.9	
Masarac	Alt Empordà	Girona	284	12.6	22.5	
Masdenverge	Montsià	Tarragona	1,106	14.6	75.8	
Les Masies de Roda	Osona	Barcelona	737	16.4	44.9	
Les Masies de Voltregà	Osona	Barcelona	3,186	22.4	142.2	
Masllorenç	Baix Penedès	Tarragona	519	6.6	78.6	
El Masnou	Maresme	Barcelona	22,742	3.4	6,688.8	
La Masó	Alt Camp	Tarragona	288	3.6	80.0	
Maspujols	Baix Camp	Tarragona	782	3.7	211.4	
Masquefa	Anoia	Barcelona	8,406	17.1	491.6	
El Masroig	Priorat	Tarragona	534	15.5	34.5	
Massalcoreig	Segrià	Lleida	560	14.1	39.7	
Massanes	Selva	Girona	723	26.1	27.7	
Massoteres	Segarra	Lleida	196	26.1	7.5	
Matadepera	Vallès Occidental	Barcelona	8,841	25.4	348.1	
Mataró	Maresme	Barcelona	124,280	22.5	5,523.6	
Mediona	Alt Penedès	Barcelona	2,311	47.6	48.6	
Menàrguens	Noguera	Lleida	887	20.2	43.9	
Meranges	Cerdanya	Girona	94	37.3	2.5	
Mieres	Garrotxa	Girona	326	26.3	12.4	
El Milà	Alt Camp	Tarragona	174	4.1	42.4	
Miralcamp	Pla d'Urgell	Lleida	1,384	14.9	92.9	
Miravet	Ribera d'Ebre	Tarragona	774	32.3	24.0	
Moià	Moianès	Barcelona	5,760	75.3	76.5	
El Molar	Priorat	Tarragona	293	22.8	12.9	
Molins de Rei	Baix Llobregat	Barcelona	25,152	15.9	1,581.9	
Mollerussa	Pla d'Urgell	Lleida	14,963	7.1	2,107.5	
Mollet de Peralada	Alt Empordà	Girona	182	6.0	30.3	
Mollet del Vallès	Vallès Oriental	Barcelona	51,719	10.8	4,788.8	
Molló	Ripollès	Girona	339	43.1	7.9	
La Molsosa	Solsonès	Lleida	116	26.9	4.3	
Monistrol de Calders	Moianès	Barcelona	695	22.0	31.6	
Monistrol de Montserrat	Bages	Barcelona	2,945	11.8	249.6	
Mont-ral	Alt Camp	Tarragona	165	34.7	4.8	
Mont-ras	Baix Empordà	Girona	1,739	12.3	141.4	
Mont-roig del Camp	Baix Camp	Tarragona	12,148	63.3	191.9	
Montagut i Oix	Garrotxa	Girona	970	93.7	10.4	
Montblanc	Conca de Barberà	Tarragona	7,359	91.1	80.8	
Montbrió del Camp	Baix Camp	Tarragona	2,650	10.7	247.7	
Montcada i Reixac	Vallès Occidental	Barcelona	34,394	23.5	1,463.6	
Montclar	Berguedà	Barcelona	117	21.9	5.3	
Montellà i Martinet	Cerdanya	Lleida	623	55.0	11.3	1
Montesquiu	Osona	Barcelona	895	4.9	182.7	
Montferrer i Castellbò	Alt Urgell	Lleida	1,027	176.7	5.8	1
Montferri	Alt Camp	Tarragona	369	19.2	19.2	
Montgai	Noguera	Lleida	671	28.9	23.2	
Montgat	Maresme	Barcelona	11,315	2.9	3,901.7	
Montmajor	Berguedà	Barcelona	476	76.5	6.2	
Montmaneu	Anoia	Barcelona	164	13.6	12.1	
El Montmell	Baix Penedès	Tarragona	1,418	72.8	19.5	
Montmeló	Vallès Oriental	Barcelona	8,863	4.0	2,215.8	
Montoliu de Lleida	Segrià	Lleida	515	7.3	70.5	
Montoliu de Segarra	Segarra	Lleida	193	29.5	6.5	
Montornès de Segarra	Segarra	Lleida	105	12.3	8.5	
Montornès del Vallès	Vallès Oriental	Barcelona	16,217	10.2	1,589.9	
Montseny	Vallès Oriental	Barcelona	332	26.8	12.4	
Móra d'Ebre	Ribera d'Ebre	Tarragona	5,578	45.1	123.7	
Móra la Nova	Ribera d'Ebre	Tarragona	3,190	15.9	200.6	
El Morell	Tarragonès	Tarragona	3,530	5.9	598.3	
La Morera de Montsant	Priorat	Tarragona	157	52.9	3.0	
Muntanyola	Osona	Barcelona	595	40.3	14.8	
Mura	Bages	Barcelona	211	47.8	4.4	
Nalec	Urgell	Lleida	93	9.2	10.1	
Naut Aran	Val d'Aran	Lleida	1,782	255.8	7.0	5
Navarcles	Bages	Barcelona	6,003	5.5	1,091.5	
Navàs	Bages	Barcelona	6,117	80.6	75.9	
Navata	Alt Empordà	Girona	1,262	18.5	68.2	
Navès	Solsonès	Lleida	280	145.3	1.9	
La Nou de Berguedà	Berguedà	Barcelona	150	25.0	6.0	
La Nou de Gaià	Tarragonès	Tarragona	548	4.3	127.4	
Nulles	Alt Camp	Tarragona	453	10.6	42.7	
Odèn	Solsonès	Lleida	267	114.4	2.3	1
Òdena	Anoia	Barcelona	3,624	52.7	68.8	
Ogassa	Ripollès	Girona	245	45.2	5.4	
Olèrdola	Alt Penedès	Barcelona	3,579	30.2	118.5	
Olesa de Bonesvalls	Alt Penedès	Barcelona	1,735	30.8	56.3	
Olesa de Montserrat	Baix Llobregat	Barcelona	23,543	16.6	1,418.3	
Oliana	Alt Urgell	Lleida	1,870	32.4	57.7	
Oliola	Noguera	Lleida	235	86.3	2.7	
Olius	Solsonès	Lleida	902	54.8	16.5	
Olivella	Garraf	Barcelona	3,609	38.8	93.0	
Olost	Osona	Barcelona	1,186	29.4	40.3	
Olot	Garrotxa	Girona	33,913	29.0	1,169.4	
Les Oluges	Segarra	Lleida	158	19.0	8.3	
Olvan	Berguedà	Barcelona	876	35.6	24.6	
Els Omellons	Garrigues	Lleida	232	11.1	20.9	
Els Omells de na Gaia	Urgell	Lleida	141	13.5	10.4	
Ordis	Alt Empordà	Girona	380	8.6	44.2	
Organyà	Alt Urgell	Lleida	841	12.5	67.3	
Orís	Osona	Barcelona	303	27.2	11.1	
Oristà	Osona	Barcelona	557	68.5	8.1	
Orpí	Anoia	Barcelona	131	15.2	8.6	
Òrrius	Maresme	Barcelona	690	5.7	121.1	
Os de Balaguer	Noguera	Lleida	1,008	136.0	7.4	1
Osor	Selva	Girona	452	52.1	8.7	
Ossó de Sió	Urgell	Lleida	211	26.3	8.0	
Pacs del Penedès	Alt Penedès	Barcelona	892	6.3	141.6	
Palafolls	Maresme	Barcelona	9,065	16.6	546.1	
Palafrugell	Baix Empordà	Girona	22,763	26.9	846.2	
Palamós	Baix Empordà	Girona	17,805	14.0	1,271.8	
El Palau d'Anglesola	Pla d'Urgell	Lleida	2,135	12.3	173.6	
Palau de Santa Eulàlia	Alt Empordà	Girona	98	8.4	11.7	
Palau-sator	Baix Empordà	Girona	305	12.4	24.6	
Palau-saverdera	Alt Empordà	Girona	1,437	16.4	87.6	
Palau-solità i Plegamans	Vallès Occidental	Barcelona	14,454	14.9	970.1	
Els Pallaresos	Tarragonès	Tarragona	4,479	5.1	878.2	
Pallejà	Baix Llobregat	Barcelona	11,253	8.3	1,355.8	
La Palma d'Ebre	Ribera d'Ebre	Tarragona	371	37.9	9.8	
La Palma de Cervelló	Baix Llobregat	Barcelona	3,002	5.5	545.8	
Palol de Revardit	Pla de l'Estany	Girona	474	18.0	26.3	
Pals	Baix Empordà	Girona	2,533	25.8	98.2	
El Papiol	Baix Llobregat	Barcelona	4,023	9.0	447.0	
Pardines	Ripollès	Girona	155	31.0	5.0	
Parets del Vallès	Vallès Oriental	Barcelona	18,733	9.1	2,058.6	
Parlavà	Baix Empordà	Girona	410	6.2	66.1	
Passanant i Belltall	Conca de Barberà	Tarragona	154	27.4	5.6	
Pau	Alt Empordà	Girona	569	10.7	53.2	
Paüls	Baix Ebre	Tarragona	596	43.8	13.6	
Pedret i Marzà	Alt Empordà	Girona	189	8.6	22.0	
Penelles	Noguera	Lleida	504	25.5	19.8	
La Pera	Baix Empordà	Girona	467	11.5	40.6	
Perafita	Osona	Barcelona	407	19.6	20.8	
Perafort	Tarragonès	Tarragona	1,287	9.5	135.5	
Peralada	Alt Empordà	Girona	1,859	43.6	42.6	
Peramola	Alt Urgell	Lleida	349	56.2	6.2	
El Perelló	Baix Ebre	Tarragona	3,155	100.7	31.3	
Piera	Anoia	Barcelona	15,000	57.2	262.2	
Les Piles	Conca de Barberà	Tarragona	214	22.4	9.6	
Pineda de Mar	Maresme	Barcelona	25,948	10.7	2,425.0	
El Pinell de Brai	Terra Alta	Tarragona	1,076	57.0	18.9	
Pinell de Solsonès	Solsonès	Lleida	207	91.1	2.3	
Pinós	Solsonès	Lleida	302	104.3	2.9	
Pira	Conca de Barberà	Tarragona	480	8.0	60.0	
El Pla de Santa Maria	Alt Camp	Tarragona	2,344	35.0	67.0	
El Pla del Penedès	Alt Penedès	Barcelona	1,223	9.6	127.4	
Les Planes d'Hostoles	Garrotxa	Girona	1,694	37.5	45.2	
Planoles	Ripollès	Girona	300	18.8	16.0	
Els Plans de Sió	Segarra	Lleida	560	55.9	10.0	
El Poal	Pla d'Urgell	Lleida	656	8.9	73.7	
La Pobla de Cérvoles	Garrigues	Lleida	220	61.9	3.6	
La Pobla de Claramunt	Anoia	Barcelona	2,186	18.5	118.2	
La Pobla de Lillet	Berguedà	Barcelona	1,155	51.4	22.5	
La Pobla de Mafumet	Tarragonès	Tarragona	3,420	6.2	551.6	
La Pobla de Massaluca	Terra Alta	Tarragona	354	43.4	8.2	
La Pobla de Montornès	Tarragonès	Tarragona	2,860	12.3	232.5	
La Pobla de Segur	Pallars Jussà	Lleida	3,012	32.8	91.8	
Poboleda	Priorat	Tarragona	361	14.0	25.8	
Polinyà	Vallès Occidental	Barcelona	8,238	8.8	936.1	
El Pont d'Armentera	Alt Camp	Tarragona	561	21.7	25.9	
El Pont de Bar	Alt Urgell	Lleida	172	42.6	4.0	
Pont de Molins	Alt Empordà	Girona	529	8.7	60.8	
El Pont de Suert	Alta Ribagorça	Lleida	2,318	148.1	15.7	
El Pont de Vilomara i Rocafort	Bages	Barcelona	3,780	27.4	138.0	
Pontils	Conca de Barberà	Tarragona	123	67.6	1.8	
Pontons	Alt Penedès	Barcelona	477	25.9	18.4	
Pontós	Alt Empordà	Girona	223	13.7	16.3	
Ponts	Noguera	Lleida	2,701	30.5	88.6	
Porqueres	Pla de l'Estany	Girona	4,529	33.5	135.2	
Porrera	Priorat	Tarragona	461	28.8	16.0	
El Port de la Selva	Alt Empordà	Girona	980	41.6	23.6	
Portbou	Alt Empordà	Girona	1,214	9.2	132.0	
La Portella	Segrià	Lleida	750	12.3	61.0	
Pradell de la Teixeta	Priorat	Tarragona	181	21.8	8.3	
Prades	Baix Camp	Tarragona	626	32.6	19.2	
Prat de Comte	Terra Alta	Tarragona	164	26.4	6.2	
El Prat de Llobregat	Baix Llobregat	Barcelona	62,866	31.4	2,002.1	
Pratdip	Baix Camp	Tarragona	685	36.3	18.9	
Prats de Lluçanès	Osona	Barcelona	2,624	13.8	190.1	
Els Prats de Rei	Anoia	Barcelona	537	26.1	20.6	
Prats i Sansor	Cerdanya	Lleida	248	6.6	37.6	
Preixana	Urgell	Lleida	405	21.5	18.8	
Preixens	Noguera	Lleida	450	28.7	15.7	
Premià de Dalt	Maresme	Barcelona	10,311	6.6	1,562.3	
Premià de Mar	Maresme	Barcelona	28,163	2.1	13,411.0	
Les Preses	Garrotxa	Girona	1,772	9.4	188.5	
Prullans	Cerdanya	Lleida	209	21.2	9.9	
Puig-reig	Berguedà	Barcelona	4,207	45.8	91.9	
Puigcerdà	Cerdanya	Girona	8,761	18.9	463.5	
Puigdàlber	Alt Penedès	Barcelona	532	0.4	1,330.0	
Puiggròs	Garrigues	Lleida	296	9.9	29.9	
Puigpelat	Alt Camp	Tarragona	1,083	9.5	114.0	
Puigverd d'Agramunt	Urgell	Lleida	259	17.0	15.2	
Puigverd de Lleida	Segrià	Lleida	1,411	12.5	112.9	
Pujalt	Anoia	Barcelona	198	31.4	6.3	
La Quar	Berguedà	Barcelona	57	38.2	1.5	
Quart	Gironès	Girona	3,441	38.1	90.3	
Queralbs	Ripollès	Girona	182	93.5	1.9	
Querol	Alt Camp	Tarragona	550	72.3	7.6	
Rabós	Alt Empordà	Girona	182	45.1	4.0	
Rajadell	Bages	Barcelona	528	45.5	11.6	
La Ràpita	Montsià	Tarragona	15,003	53.7	279.4	
Rasquera	Ribera d'Ebre	Tarragona	858	51.3	16.7	
Regencós	Baix Empordà	Girona	291	6.3	46.2	
Rellinars	Vallès Occidental	Barcelona	726	17.8	40.8	
Renau	Tarragonès	Tarragona	141	8.2	17.2	
Reus	Baix Camp	Tarragona	104,962	52.8	1,987.9	
Rialp	Pallars Sobirà	Lleida	667	63.3	10.5	
La Riba	Alt Camp	Tarragona	601	8.0	75.1	
Riba-roja d'Ebre	Ribera d'Ebre	Tarragona	1,195	99.1	12.1	
Ribera d'Ondara	Segarra	Lleida	420	54.5	7.7	
Ribera d'Urgellet	Alt Urgell	Lleida	963	107.0	9.0	
Ribes de Freser	Ripollès	Girona	1,859	41.9	44.4	
Riells i Viabrea	Selva	Girona	4,000	27.0	148.1	
La Riera de Gaià	Tarragonès	Tarragona	1,678	8.8	190.7	
Riner	Solsonès	Lleida	281	47.1	6.0	
Ripoll	Ripollès	Girona	10,751	73.7	145.9	
Ripollet	Vallès Occidental	Barcelona	37,233	4.3	8,658.8	
Riu de Cerdanya	Cerdanya	Lleida	106	12.3	8.6	
Riudarenes	Selva	Girona	2,148	47.6	45.1	
Riudaura	Garrotxa	Girona	463	23.6	19.6	
Riudecanyes	Baix Camp	Tarragona	1,142	17.1	66.8	
Riudecols	Baix Camp	Tarragona	1,254	19.5	64.3	
Riudellots de la Selva	Selva	Girona	2,026	13.1	154.7	
Riudoms	Baix Camp	Tarragona	6,546	32.4	202.0	
Riumors	Alt Empordà	Girona	244	6.5	37.5	
La Roca del Vallès	Vallès Oriental	Barcelona	10,518	36.9	285.0	
Rocafort de Queralt	Conca de Barberà	Tarragona	256	8.5	30.1	
Roda de Berà	Tarragonès	Tarragona	6,322	16.5	383.2	
Roda de Ter	Osona	Barcelona	6,124	2.2	2,783.6	
Rodonyà	Alt Camp	Tarragona	513	8.5	60.4	
Roquetes	Baix Ebre	Tarragona	8,287	136.9	60.5	
Roses	Alt Empordà	Girona	19,600	45.9	427.0	
Rosselló	Segrià	Lleida	3,021	9.9	305.2	
El Rourell	Alt Camp	Tarragona	394	2.3	171.3	
Rubí	Vallès Occidental	Barcelona	74,353	32.3	2,302.0	
Rubió	Anoia	Barcelona	228	48.0	4.8	
Rupià	Baix Empordà	Girona	246	5.3	46.4	
Rupit i Pruit	Osona	Barcelona	300	47.8	6.3	
Sabadell	Vallès Occidental	Barcelona	207,444	37.8	5,487.9	
Sagàs	Berguedà	Barcelona	149	44.6	3.3	
Salàs de Pallars	Pallars Jussà	Lleida	365	20.3	18.0	
Saldes	Berguedà	Barcelona	283	66.4	4.3	
Sales de Llierca	Garrotxa	Girona	133	35.8	3.7	
Sallent	Bages	Barcelona	6,780	65.2	104.0	
Salomó	Tarragonès	Tarragona	539	12.2	44.2	
Salou	Tarragonès	Tarragona	26,558	15.1	1,758.8	
Salt	Gironès	Girona	30,103	6.6	4,561.1	
Sanaüja	Segarra	Lleida	423	33.0	12.8	
Sant Adrià de Besòs	Barcelonès	Barcelona	35,386	3.8	9,312.1	
Sant Agustí de Lluçanès	Osona	Barcelona	91	13.2	6.9	
Sant Andreu de la Barca	Baix Llobregat	Barcelona	27,268	5.5	4,957.8	
Sant Andreu de Llavaneres	Maresme	Barcelona	10,590	11.8	897.5	
Sant Andreu Salou	Gironès	Girona	155	6.0	25.8	
Sant Aniol de Finestres	Garrotxa	Girona	351	47.7	7.4	
Sant Antoni de Vilamajor	Vallès Oriental	Barcelona	5,708	13.7	416.6	
Sant Bartomeu del Grau	Osona	Barcelona	875	34.4	25.4	
Sant Boi de Llobregat	Baix Llobregat	Barcelona	83,107	21.5	3,865.4	
Sant Boi de Lluçanès	Osona	Barcelona	556	19.5	28.5	
Sant Cebrià de Vallalta	Maresme	Barcelona	3,328	15.7	212.0	
Sant Celoni	Vallès Oriental	Barcelona	17,251	65.2	264.6	
Sant Climent de Llobregat	Baix Llobregat	Barcelona	3,938	10.8	364.6	
Sant Climent Sescebes	Alt Empordà	Girona	590	24.4	24.2	
Sant Cugat del Vallès	Vallès Occidental	Barcelona	87,118	48.2	1,807.4	1
Sant Cugat Sesgarrigues	Alt Penedès	Barcelona	972	6.2	156.8	
Sant Esteve de la Sarga	Pallars Jussà	Lleida	132	92.9	1.4	
Sant Esteve de Palautordera	Vallès Oriental	Barcelona	2,532	10.6	238.9	
Sant Esteve Sesrovires	Baix Llobregat	Barcelona	7,542	18.6	405.5	
Sant Feliu de Buixalleu	Selva	Girona	776	61.9	12.5	
Sant Feliu de Codines	Vallès Oriental	Barcelona	5,900	15.0	393.3	
Sant Feliu de Guíxols	Baix Empordà	Girona	21,810	16.2	1,346.3	
Sant Feliu de Llobregat	Baix Llobregat	Barcelona	43,715	11.8	3,704.7	
Sant Feliu de Pallerols	Garrotxa	Girona	1,353	34.9	38.8	
Sant Feliu Sasserra	Bages	Barcelona	626	22.4	27.9	
Sant Ferriol	Garrotxa	Girona	240	42.2	5.7	
Sant Fost de Campsentelles	Vallès Oriental	Barcelona	8,666	13.2	656.5	
Sant Fruitós de Bages	Bages	Barcelona	8,243	22.2	371.3	
Sant Gregori	Gironès	Girona	3,464	49.2	70.4	
Sant Guim de Freixenet	Segarra	Lleida	1,107	25.1	44.1	
Sant Guim de la Plana	Segarra	Lleida	175	12.4	14.1	
Sant Hilari Sacalm	Selva	Girona	5,681	83.3	68.2	
Sant Hipòlit de Voltregà	Osona	Barcelona	3,446	0.9	3,828.9	
Sant Iscle de Vallalta	Maresme	Barcelona	1,304	17.8	73.3	
Sant Jaume d'Enveja	Montsià	Tarragona	3,555	60.8	58.5	1
Sant Jaume de Frontanyà	Berguedà	Barcelona	24	21.3	1.1	
Sant Jaume de Llierca	Garrotxa	Girona	812	6.8	119.4	
Sant Jaume dels Domenys	Baix Penedès	Tarragona	2,493	24.4	102.2	
Sant Joan de les Abadesses	Ripollès	Girona	3,413	53.7	63.6	
Sant Joan de Mollet	Gironès	Girona	509	3.2	159.1	
Sant Joan de Vilatorrada	Bages	Barcelona	10,733	16.4	654.5	1
Sant Joan Despí	Baix Llobregat	Barcelona	32,981	6.2	5,319.5	
Sant Joan les Fonts	Garrotxa	Girona	2,919	31.9	91.5	
Sant Jordi Desvalls	Gironès	Girona	708	11.7	60.5	
Sant Julià de Cerdanyola	Berguedà	Barcelona	239	11.8	20.3	
Sant Julià de Ramis	Gironès	Girona	3,434	18.76	183.0	
Sant Julià de Vilatorta	Osona	Barcelona	3,123	15.9	196.4	
Sant Julià del Llor i Bonmatí	Selva	Girona	1,264	9.7	130.3	
Sant Just Desvern	Baix Llobregat	Barcelona	16,389	7.8	2,101.2	
Sant Llorenç d'Hortons	Alt Penedès	Barcelona	2,517	19.7	127.8	
Sant Llorenç de la Muga	Alt Empordà	Girona	249	31.8	7.8	
Sant Llorenç de Morunys	Solsonès	Lleida	993	4.3	230.9	
Sant Llorenç Savall	Vallès Occidental	Barcelona	2,361	41.1	57.4	
Sant Martí d'Albars	Osona	Barcelona	106	14.7	7.2	
Sant Martí de Centelles	Osona	Barcelona	1,093	25.6	42.7	
Sant Martí de Llémena	Gironès	Girona	626	43.1	14.5	
Sant Martí de Riucorb	Urgell	Lleida	685	34.9	19.6	
Sant Martí de Tous	Anoia	Barcelona	1,175	39.2	30.0	
Sant Martí Sarroca	Alt Penedès	Barcelona	3,130	35.3	88.7	
Sant Martí Sesgueioles	Anoia	Barcelona	395	3.9	101.3	
Sant Martí Vell	Gironès	Girona	242	17.5	13.8	
Sant Mateu de Bages	Bages	Barcelona	644	102.9	6.3	
Sant Miquel de Campmajor	Pla de l'Estany	Girona	232	33.2	7.0	
Sant Miquel de Fluvià	Alt Empordà	Girona	798	3.5	228.0	
Sant Mori	Alt Empordà	Girona	177	7.5	23.6	
Sant Pau de Segúries	Ripollès	Girona	674	8.7	77.5	
Sant Pere de Ribes	Garraf	Barcelona	29,339	40.8	719.1	
Sant Pere de Riudebitlles	Alt Penedès	Barcelona	2,364	5.4	437.8	
Sant Pere de Torelló	Osona	Barcelona	2,436	55.1	44.2	
Sant Pere de Vilamajor	Vallès Oriental	Barcelona	4,248	34.7	122.4	
Sant Pere Pescador	Alt Empordà	Girona	2,138	18.4	116.2	
Sant Pere Sallavinera	Anoia	Barcelona	162	22.0	7.4	
Sant Pol de Mar	Maresme	Barcelona	4,997	7.5	666.3	
Sant Quintí de Mediona	Alt Penedès	Barcelona	2,101	13.8	152.2	
Sant Quirze de Besora	Osona	Barcelona	2,148	8.1	265.2	
Sant Quirze del Vallès	Vallès Occidental	Barcelona	19,549	14.1	1,386.5	
Sant Quirze Safaja	Moianès	Barcelona	644	26.2	24.6	
Sant Ramon	Segarra	Lleida	496	18.5	26.8	
Sant Sadurní d'Anoia	Alt Penedès	Barcelona	12,590	19.0	662.6	
Sant Sadurní d'Osormort	Osona	Barcelona	86	30.6	2.8	
Sant Salvador de Guardiola	Bages	Barcelona	3,130	37.2	84.1	
Sant Vicenç de Castellet	Bages	Barcelona	9,326	17.1	545.4	
Sant Vicenç de Montalt	Maresme	Barcelona	6,007	8.0	750.9	
Sant Vicenç de Torelló	Osona	Barcelona	1,975	6.6	299.2	
Sant Vicenç dels Horts	Baix Llobregat	Barcelona	28,103	9.1	3,088.2	
Santa Bàrbara	Montsià	Tarragona	3,821	28.2	135.5	
Santa Cecília de Voltregà	Osona	Barcelona	173	8.6	20.1	
Santa Coloma de Cervelló	Baix Llobregat	Barcelona	8,038	7.5	1,071.7	
Santa Coloma de Farners	Selva	Girona	12,601	70.6	178.5	
Santa Coloma de Gramenet	Barcelonès	Barcelona	118,738	7.0	16,962.6	
Santa Coloma de Queralt	Conca de Barberà	Tarragona	2,931	33.8	86.7	
Santa Cristina d'Aro	Baix Empordà	Girona	5,194	67.6	76.8	
Santa Eugènia de Berga	Osona	Barcelona	2,233	7.0	319.0	
Santa Eulàlia de Riuprimer	Osona	Barcelona	1,259	13.8	91.2	
Santa Eulàlia de Ronçana	Vallès Oriental	Barcelona	7,114	14.2	501.0	
Santa Fe del Penedès	Alt Penedès	Barcelona	379	3.4	111.5	
Santa Llogaia d'Àlguema	Alt Empordà	Girona	341	1.9	179.5	
Santa Margarida de Montbui	Anoia	Barcelona	9,641	27.6	349.3	
Santa Margarida i els Monjos	Alt Penedès	Barcelona	7,337	17.2	426.6	
Santa Maria d'Oló	Moianès	Barcelona	1,065	66.2	16.1	
Santa Maria de Besora	Osona	Barcelona	162	24.7	6.6	
Santa Maria de Martorelles	Vallès Oriental	Barcelona	851	4.5	189.1	
Santa Maria de Merlès	Berguedà	Barcelona	177	52.1	3.4	
Santa Maria de Miralles	Anoia	Barcelona	140	25.0	5.6	
Santa Maria de Palautordera	Vallès Oriental	Barcelona	9,138	16.9	540.7	
Santa Oliva	Baix Penedès	Tarragona	3,287	9.6	342.4	
Santa Pau	Garrotxa	Girona	1,567	49.0	32.0	
Santa Perpètua de Mogoda	Vallès Occidental	Barcelona	25,409	15.8	1,608.2	
Santa Susanna	Maresme	Barcelona	3,293	12.6	261.3	
Santpedor	Bages	Barcelona	7,384	16.6	444.8	
Sarral	Conca de Barberà	Tarragona	1,595	52.4	30.4	
Sarrià de Ter	Gironès	Girona	4,937	4.2	1,175.5	
Sarroca de Bellera	Pallars Jussà	Lleida	124	87.5	1.4	1
Sarroca de Lleida	Segrià	Lleida	403	42.2	9.5	
Saus, Camallera i Llampaies	Alt Empordà	Girona	815	11.4	71.5	
Savallà del Comtat	Conca de Barberà	Tarragona	65	14.8	4.4	
La Secuita	Tarragonès	Tarragona	1,665	17.8	93.5	
La Selva de Mar	Alt Empordà	Girona	181	7.2	25.1	
La Selva del Camp	Baix Camp	Tarragona	5,598	35.3	158.6	
Senan	Conca de Barberà	Tarragona	53	11.7	4.5	
La Sénia	Montsià	Tarragona	5,893	108.4	54.4	
Senterada	Pallars Jussà	Lleida	131	34.4	3.8	
La Sentiu de Sió	Noguera	Lleida	467	29.6	15.8	
Sentmenat	Vallès Occidental	Barcelona	8,645	28.8	300.2	
Serinyà	Pla de l'Estany	Girona	1,123	17.4	64.5	
Seròs	Segrià	Lleida	1,887	85.8	22.0	
Serra de Daró	Baix Empordà	Girona	211	7.9	26.7	
Setcases	Ripollès	Girona	195	49.1	4.0	
La Seu d'Urgell	Alt Urgell	Lleida	12,366	15.4	803.0	
Seva	Osona	Barcelona	3,488	30.4	114.7	1
Sidamon	Pla d'Urgell	Lleida	706	8.1	87.2	
Sils	Selva	Girona	5,851	29.9	195.7	
Sitges	Garraf	Barcelona	28,171	43.8	643.2	
Siurana	Alt Empordà	Girona	150	10.5	14.3	
Sobremunt	Osona	Barcelona	83	13.8	6.0	
El Soleràs	Garrigues	Lleida	359	12.2	29.4	
Solivella	Conca de Barberà	Tarragona	653	21.4	30.5	
Solsona	Solsonès	Lleida	9,067	17.7	512.3	
Sora	Osona	Barcelona	175	31.7	5.5	
Soriguera	Pallars Sobirà	Lleida	377	106.4	3.5	1
Sort	Pallars Sobirà	Lleida	2,237	105.0	21.3	
Soses	Segrià	Lleida	1,754	30.2	58.1	
Subirats	Alt Penedès	Barcelona	3,029	55.9	54.2	
Sudanell	Segrià	Lleida	872	8.7	100.2	
Sunyer	Segrià	Lleida	307	12.7	24.2	
Súria	Bages	Barcelona	5,999	23.6	254.2	
Susqueda	Selva	Girona	95	50.6	1.9	
Tagamanent	Vallès Oriental	Barcelona	322	43.3	7.4	
Talamanca	Bages	Barcelona	141	29.4	4.8	
Talarn	Pallars Jussà	Lleida	413	28.0	14.8	
Talavera	Segarra	Lleida	267	30.1	8.9	
La Tallada d'Empordà	Baix Empordà	Girona	454	16.6	27.3	
Taradell	Osona	Barcelona	6,219	26.5	234.7	
Tarragona	Tarragonès	Tarragona	132,199	57.9	2,283.2	
Tàrrega	Urgell	Lleida	16,587	88.4	187.6	1
Tarrés	Garrigues	Lleida	105	13.0	8.1	
Tarroja de Segarra	Segarra	Lleida	173	7.6	22.8	
Tavèrnoles	Osona	Barcelona	317	18.8	16.9	
Tavertet	Osona	Barcelona	125	32.5	3.8	
Teià	Maresme	Barcelona	6,141	6.6	930.5	
Térmens	Noguera	Lleida	1,536	27.5	55.9	
Terrades	Alt Empordà	Girona	288	21.0	13.7	
Terrassa	Vallès Occidental	Barcelona	215,517	70.2	3,070.0	
Tiana	Maresme	Barcelona	8,314	8.0	1,039.2	
Tírvia	Pallars Sobirà	Lleida	156	8.5	18.4	
Tiurana	Noguera	Lleida	76	15.9	4.8	
Tivenys	Baix Ebre	Tarragona	876	53.5	16.4	
Tivissa	Ribera d'Ebre	Tarragona	1,760	209.4	8.4	1
Tona	Osona	Barcelona	8,012	16.5	485.6	
Torà	Segarra	Lleida	1,202	93.3	12.9	
Tordera	Maresme	Barcelona	16,345	84.1	194.4	
Torelló	Osona	Barcelona	13,949	13.5	1,033.3	
Els Torms	Garrigues	Lleida	148	13.8	10.7	
Tornabous	Urgell	Lleida	911	24.2	37.6	
La Torre de Cabdella	Pallars Jussà	Lleida	761	165.3	4.6	1
La Torre de Claramunt	Anoia	Barcelona	3,819	15.0	254.6	
La Torre de Fontaubella	Priorat	Tarragona	126	7.1	17.7	
La Torre de l'Espanyol	Ribera d'Ebre	Tarragona	676	27.9	24.2	
Torre-serona	Segrià	Lleida	388	5.9	65.8	
Torrebesses	Segrià	Lleida	291	27.4	10.6	
Torredembarra	Tarragonès	Tarragona	15,475	8.7	1,778.7	
Torrefarrera	Segrià	Lleida	4,512	23.5	192.0	
Torrefeta i Florejacs	Segarra	Lleida	601	88.9	6.8	
Torregrossa	Pla d'Urgell	Lleida	2,235	40.5	55.2	
Torrelameu	Noguera	Lleida	709	10.9	65.0	
Torrelavit	Alt Penedès	Barcelona	1,393	23.6	59.0	
Torrelles de Foix	Alt Penedès	Barcelona	2,308	36.7	62.9	
Torrelles de Llobregat	Baix Llobregat	Barcelona	5,851	13.6	430.2	
Torrent	Baix Empordà	Girona	170	8.0	21.2	
Torres de Segre	Segrià	Lleida	2,301	50.6	45.5	
Torroella de Fluvià	Alt Empordà	Girona	704	16.8	41.9	
Torroella de Montgrí	Baix Empordà	Girona	11,381	65.9	172.7	1
Torroja del Priorat	Priorat	Tarragona	160	13.2	12.1	
Tortellà	Garrotxa	Girona	772	11.1	69.5	
Tortosa	Baix Ebre	Tarragona	33,932	218.5	155.3	3
Toses	Ripollès	Girona	150	57.9	2.6	
Tossa de Mar	Selva	Girona	5,681	38.6	147.2	
Tremp	Pallars Jussà	Lleida	6,305	302.8	20.8	1
Ullà	Baix Empordà	Girona	1,053	7.3	144.2	
Ullastrell	Vallès Occidental	Barcelona	2,056	7.3	281.6	
Ullastret	Baix Empordà	Girona	289	11.1	26.0	
Ulldecona	Montsià	Tarragona	6,904	126.9	54.4	
Ulldemolins	Priorat	Tarragona	412	38.2	10.8	
Ultramort	Baix Empordà	Girona	204	4.4	46.4	
Urús	Cerdanya	Girona	185	17.4	10.6	
Vacarisses	Vallès Occidental	Barcelona	6,218	40.7	152.8	
La Vajol	Alt Empordà	Girona	86	4.7	18.3	
La Vall d'en Bas	Garrotxa	Girona	2,965	90.7	32.7	
La Vall de Bianya	Garrotxa	Girona	1,305	93.6	13.9	
Vall de Boí	Alta Ribagorça	Lleida	992	219.5	4.5	1
Vall de Cardós	Pallars Sobirà	Lleida	384	56.2	6.8	
Vall-llobrega	Baix Empordà	Girona	901	5.4	166.9	
Vallbona d'Anoia	Anoia	Barcelona	1,424	6.4	222.5	
Vallbona de les Monges	Urgell	Lleida	262	34.1	7.7	1
Vallcebre	Berguedà	Barcelona	258	28.0	9.2	
Vallclara	Conca de Barberà	Tarragona	116	13.6	8.5	
Vallfogona de Balaguer	Noguera	Lleida	1,888	27.0	69.9	
Vallfogona de Ripollès	Ripollès	Girona	215	39.2	5.5	
Vallfogona de Riucorb	Conca de Barberà	Tarragona	99	10.9	9.1	
Vallgorguina	Vallès Oriental	Barcelona	2,699	22.1	122.1	
Vallirana	Baix Llobregat	Barcelona	14,612	23.9	611.4	
Vallmoll	Alt Camp	Tarragona	1,670	16.7	100.0	
Vallromanes	Vallès Oriental	Barcelona	2,519	10.6	237.6	
Valls	Alt Camp	Tarragona	24,570	55.3	444.3	1
Les Valls d'Aguilar	Alt Urgell	Lleida	298	123.8	2.4	2
Les Valls de Valira	Alt Urgell	Lleida	849	171.2	5.0	7
Vandellòs i l'Hospitalet de l'Infant	Baix Camp	Tarragona	6,047	102.7	58.9	
La Vansa i Fórnols	Alt Urgell	Lleida	210	106.1	2.0	
Veciana	Anoia	Barcelona	176	38.9	4.5	
El Vendrell	Baix Penedès	Tarragona	36,719	36.8	997.8	
Ventalló	Alt Empordà	Girona	836	25.0	33.4	
Verdú	Urgell	Lleida	964	35.8	26.9	
Verges	Baix Empordà	Girona	1,195	9.7	123.2	
Vespella de Gaià	Tarragonès	Tarragona	417	18.0	23.2	
Vic	Osona	Barcelona	41,956	30.6	1,371.1	
Vidrà	Osona	Girona	169	34.4	4.9	
Vidreres	Selva	Girona	7,702	48.0	160.5	
Vielha e Mijaran	Val d'Aran	Lleida	5,474	211.7	25.9	7
Vila-rodona	Alt Camp	Tarragona	1,264	33.1	38.2	
Vila-sacra	Alt Empordà	Girona	681	6.0	113.5	
Vila-sana	Pla d'Urgell	Lleida	706	19.1	37.0	
Vila-seca	Tarragonès	Tarragona	21,923	21.6	1,015.0	
Vilabella	Alt Camp	Tarragona	805	18.2	44.2	
Vilabertran	Alt Empordà	Girona	913	2.3	397.0	
Vilablareix	Gironès	Girona	2,529	6.2	407.9	
Vilada	Berguedà	Barcelona	443	22.3	19.9	
Viladamat	Alt Empordà	Girona	440	11.7	37.6	
Viladasens	Gironès	Girona	216	15.7	13.8	
Viladecans	Baix Llobregat	Barcelona	65,358	20.4	3,203.8	
Viladecavalls	Vallès Occidental	Barcelona	7,395	20.1	367.9	
Vilademuls	Pla de l'Estany	Girona	787	61.5	12.8	
Viladrau	Osona	Girona	1,037	50.7	20.5	
Vilafant	Alt Empordà	Girona	5,481	8.4	652.5	
Vilafranca del Penedès	Alt Penedès	Barcelona	39,221	19.6	2,001.1	
Vilagrassa	Urgell	Lleida	514	19.9	25.8	
Vilajuïga	Alt Empordà	Girona	1,190	13.1	90.8	
Vilalba dels Arcs	Terra Alta	Tarragona	682	67.2	10.1	
Vilalba Sasserra	Vallès Oriental	Barcelona	706	6.0	117.7	
Vilaller	Alta Ribagorça	Lleida	563	59.2	9.5	1
Vilallonga de Ter	Ripollès	Girona	421	64.2	6.6	
Vilallonga del Camp	Tarragonès	Tarragona	2,229	9.0	247.7	
Vilamacolum	Alt Empordà	Girona	307	5.6	54.8	
Vilamalla	Alt Empordà	Girona	1,103	8.8	125.3	
Vilamaniscle	Alt Empordà	Girona	170	5.5	30.9	
Vilamòs	Val d'Aran	Lleida	171	15.4	11.1	
Vilanant	Alt Empordà	Girona	399	16.9	23.6	
Vilanova d'Escornalbou	Baix Camp	Tarragona	540	17.2	31.4	
Vilanova de Bellpuig	Pla d'Urgell	Lleida	1,179	14.0	84.2	
Vilanova de l'Aguda	Noguera	Lleida	228	53.7	4.2	
Vilanova de la Barca	Segrià	Lleida	1,120	21.6	51.9	
Vilanova de Meià	Noguera	Lleida	422	105.2	4.0	1
Vilanova de Prades	Conca de Barberà	Tarragona	126	21.5	5.9	
Vilanova de Sau	Osona	Barcelona	314	58.8	5.3	
Vilanova de Segrià	Segrià	Lleida	930	8.5	109.4	
Vilanova del Camí	Anoia	Barcelona	12,506	10.3	1,214.2	
Vilanova del Vallès	Vallès Oriental	Barcelona	5,250	15.2	345.4	
Vilanova i la Geltrú	Garraf	Barcelona	65,941	34.0	1,939.4	
Vilaplana	Baix Camp	Tarragona	630	23.2	27.2	
Vilassar de Dalt	Maresme	Barcelona	8,882	8.9	998.0	
Vilassar de Mar	Maresme	Barcelona	20,185	4.0	5,046.2	
Vilaür	Alt Empordà	Girona	153	5.5	27.8	
Vilaverd	Conca de Barberà	Tarragona	487	12.6	38.7	
La Vilella Alta	Priorat	Tarragona	129	5.2	24.8	
La Vilella Baixa	Priorat	Tarragona	202	5.6	36.1	
Vilobí d'Onyar	Selva	Girona	3,136	32.6	96.2	
Vilobí del Penedès	Alt Penedès	Barcelona	1,090	9.3	117.2	
Vilopriu	Baix Empordà	Girona	209	16.4	12.7	
El Vilosell	Garrigues	Lleida	188	18.9	9.9	
Vimbodí i Poblet	Conca de Barberà	Tarragona	964	66.1	14.6	
Vinaixa	Garrigues	Lleida	546	37.6	14.5	
Vinebre	Ribera d'Ebre	Tarragona	449	26.4	17.0	
Vinyols i els Arcs	Baix Camp	Tarragona	1,872	10.8	173.3	
Viver i Serrateix	Berguedà	Barcelona	174	66.8	2.6	
Xerta	Baix Ebre	Tarragona	1,250	32.4	38.6	
Total: 947			7,518,903	32,108.0 (Note: The total of the figures above is 32,107.1. The difference may be due to rounding.)	234.2	65
