= Carlos Albarrán =

Spanish footballer (born 1994)

Personal information
- Full name: Carlos Albarrán Sanz
- Date of birth: 15 January 1994 (age 32)
- Place of birth: Badalona, Spain
- Height: 1.85 m (6 ft 1 in)
- Position: Right-back

Team information
- Current team: Córdoba
- Number: 21

Youth career
- Badalona
- 2002–2013: Espanyol

Senior career*
Years	Team	Apps	(Gls)
2013–2014	Espanyol B	1	(0)
2013–2014	→ Sant Andreu (loan)	10	(0)
2014–2016	Prat	67	(1)
2016–2017	Llagostera	24	(1)
2017–2019	Badalona	64	(7)
2019–2022	Gimnàstic	64	(1)
2022–2023	Algeciras	35	(1)
2023–	Córdoba	102	(8)
- * Club domestic league appearances and goals as of 6 June 2026

Carlos Albarrán Sanz (born 15 January 1994) is a Spanish footballer who plays as a right-back for Córdoba CF.

== Career ==
Albarrán was born in Badalona, Barcelona, Catalonia, and joined RCD Espanyol's youth sides at the age of eight, from hometown side CF Badalona. He made his senior debut with the reserves on 12 May 2013, coming on as a second-half substitute for Arthur Irawan in a 0–0 Segunda División B away draw against Valencia CF Mestalla.

On 22 August 2013, Albarrán was loaned to fellow third division side UE Sant Andreu for the season. In September 2014, he signed for Tercera División side AE Prat,

On 6 July 2016, after helping the Potablava to achieve promotion to division three, Albarrán joined UE Llagostera of the same category. Roughly one year later, he returned to Badalona.

On 4 July 2019, Albarrán agreed to a two-year contract with Gimnàstic de Tarragona still in division three. He signed a new two-year deal with the club on 2 June 2021, but left the club on 12 August of the following year, after spending the 2021–22 campaign as a backup to Pol Domingo.

On 14 August 2022, Albarrán signed for Primera Federación side Algeciras CF. He moved to fellow league team Córdoba CF on a two-year contract the following 4 July, and was an undisputed starter during the campaign as the club achieved promotion to Segunda División.

Albarrán made his professional debut at the age of 30 on 16 August 2024, starting in a 1–0 away loss to CD Mirandés.
