= La Canonja =

- Municipality
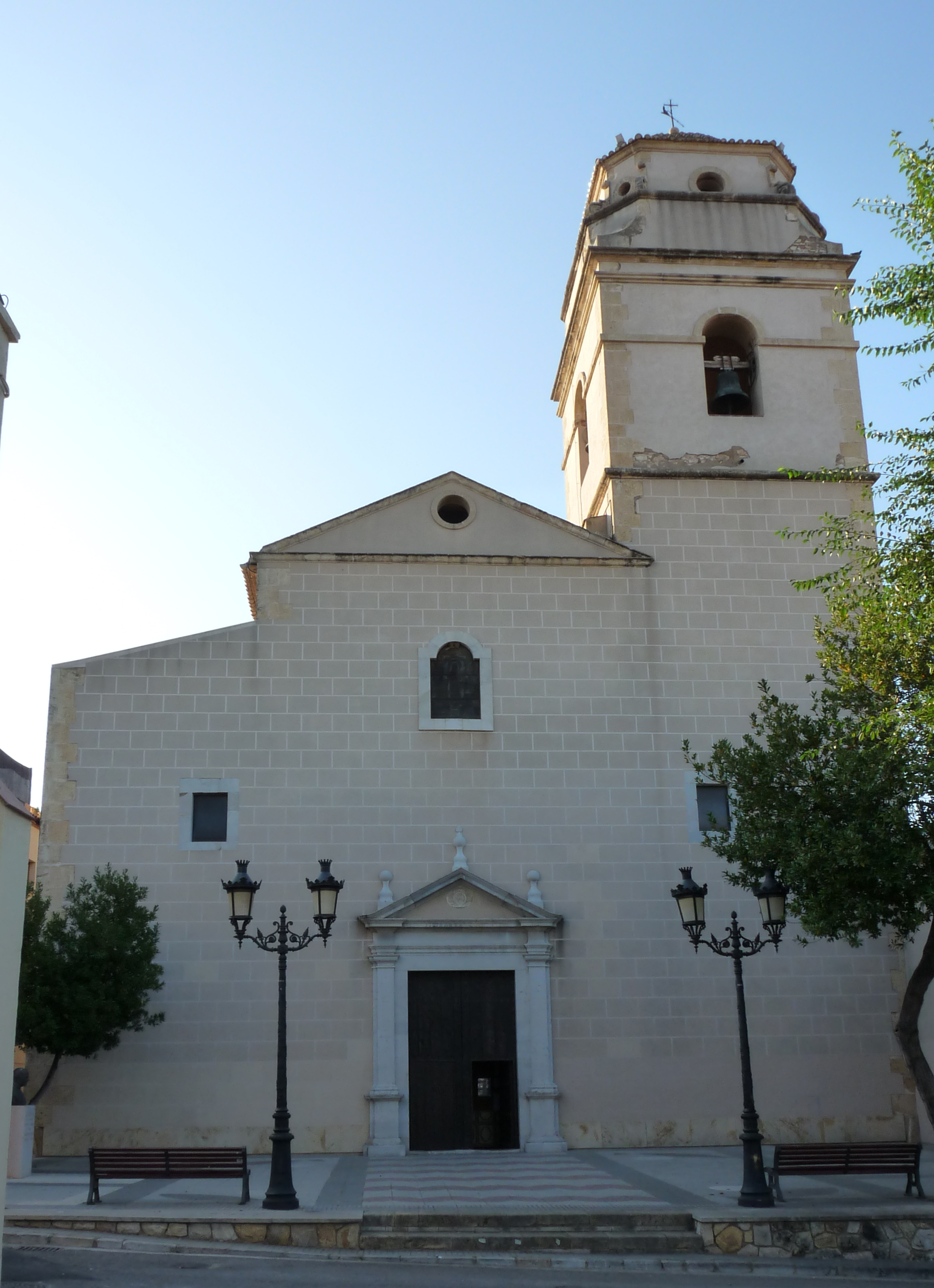
- Sant Sebastià church

- Coat of arms

- Location in Catalonia
- Coordinates: 41°07′25″N 1°10′43″E
- Country: Spain
- Community: Catalonia
- Province: Tarragona
- Comarca: Tarragonès
- Municipality: 15 April 2010

Government
  - Type: Mayor–council
  - Body: Ajuntament de La Canonja
  - Mayor: Roc Muñoz Martínez (2015) (PSC)

Area
  - Total: 7.3 km^{2} (2.8 sq mi)
- Elevation (AMSL): 46 m (151 ft)

Population (2025-01-01)
  - Total: 6,001
  - Density: 820/km^{2} (2,100/sq mi)
- Demonym(s): canongí, canongina
- Postal code: 43110
- Area code: +34 (Spain) 977 (Province)
- Website: www.lacanonja.cat

La Canonja (Catalan pronunciation: [lə kəˈnɔɲʒə]) is a municipality of the comarca of Tarragonès, in the province of Tarragona, in Catalonia, Spain. It has a population of 6,001 (register office, 2025).

La Canonja was segregated from Tarragona on 15 April 2010 by a decision of the Parliament of Catalonia. It borders with Tarragona, Reus and Vila-seca.
