= Vespella de Gaià =

- Municipality
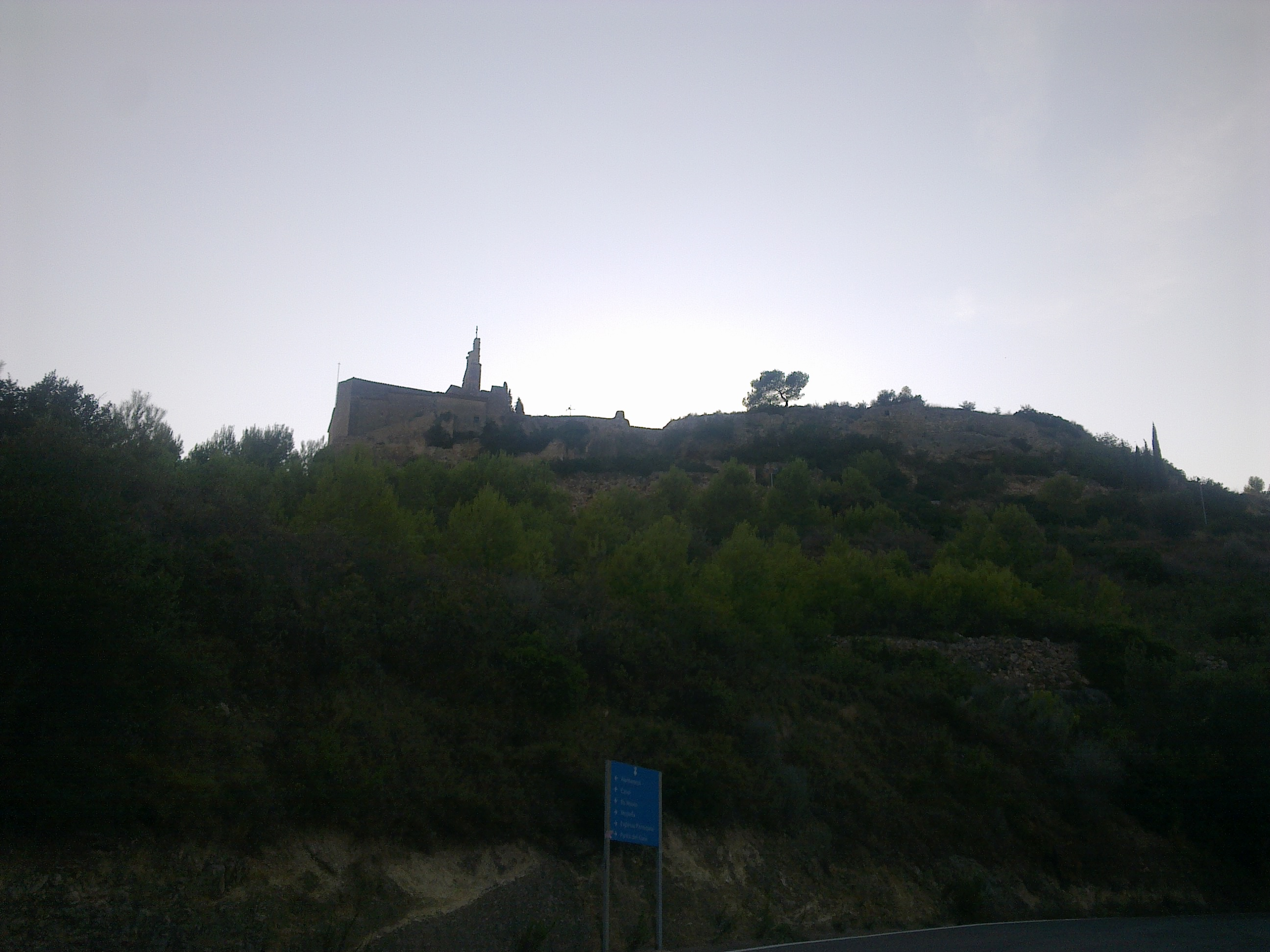
- Vespella castle

- Flag Coat of arms

- Location in Catalonia
- Coordinates: 41°12′19″N 1°21′35″E
- Country: Spain
- Autonomous community: Catalonia
- Province: Tarragona
- Comarca: Tarragonès

Government
  - mayor: Daniel Cid Ricote (2015)

Area
  - Total: 18.0 km^{2} (6.9 sq mi)
- Elevation: 191 m (627 ft)

Population (2025-01-01)
  - Total: 502
  - Density: 27.9/km^{2} (72.2/sq mi)
- Demonym: Vespellenc
- Time zone: UTC+1 (CET)
  - Summer (DST): UTC+2 (CEST)
- Postal code: 43763
- Official language(s): Catalan, Spanish
- Website: www.vespella.altanet.org

Vespella de Gaià (Catalan pronunciation: [bəsˈpeʎə ðə ɣəˈja]) is a municipality in the province of Tarragona, Catalonia, Spain. It has a population of 502 (register office, 2025).

The parish church is in Romanesque style, and houses a 1579 retablo.
