= La Nou de Gaià =

- Municipality
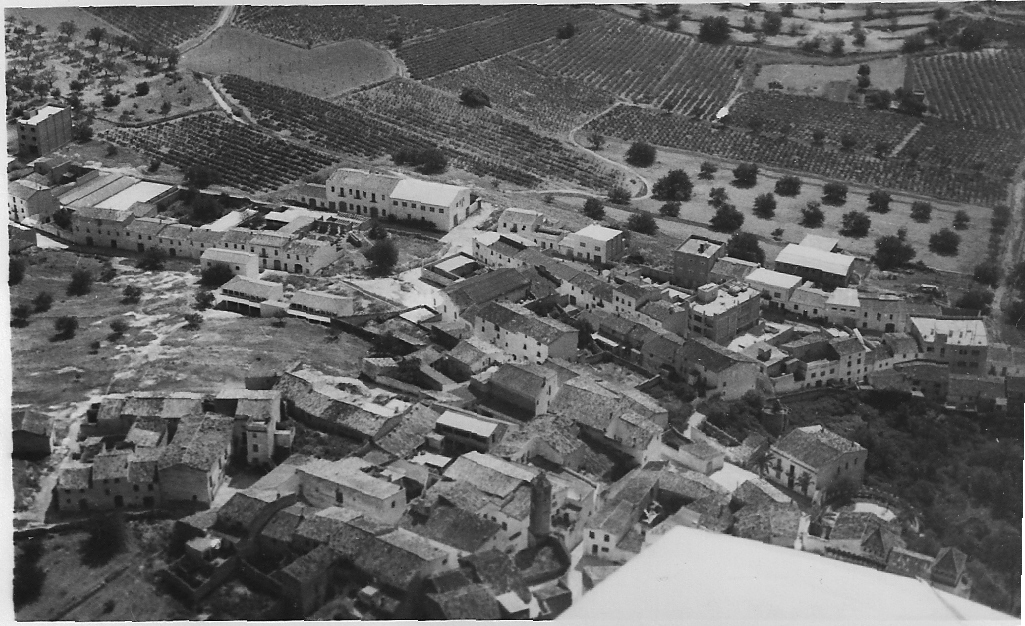
- Aerial view of the town in the 1960s.

- Coat of arms

- Location in Catalonia
- Coordinates: 41°11′7″N 1°22′34″E
- Country: Spain
- Community: Catalonia
- Province: Tarragona
- Comarca: Tarragonès

Government
  - mayor: Abel Marti Gallofré (2015)

Area
  - Total: 4.3 km^{2} (1.7 sq mi)
- Elevation: 94 m (308 ft)

Population (2025-01-01)
  - Total: 603
  - Density: 140/km^{2} (360/sq mi)
- Demonym: Nouenc
- Postal code: 43763
- Website: www.noudegaia.altanet.org

La Nou de Gaià (Catalan pronunciation: [lə ˈnɔw ðə ɣəˈja]) is a village in the province of Tarragona and autonomous community of Catalonia, Spain. It has a population of 603 (register office, 2025).
