= Els Pallaresos =

- Municipality
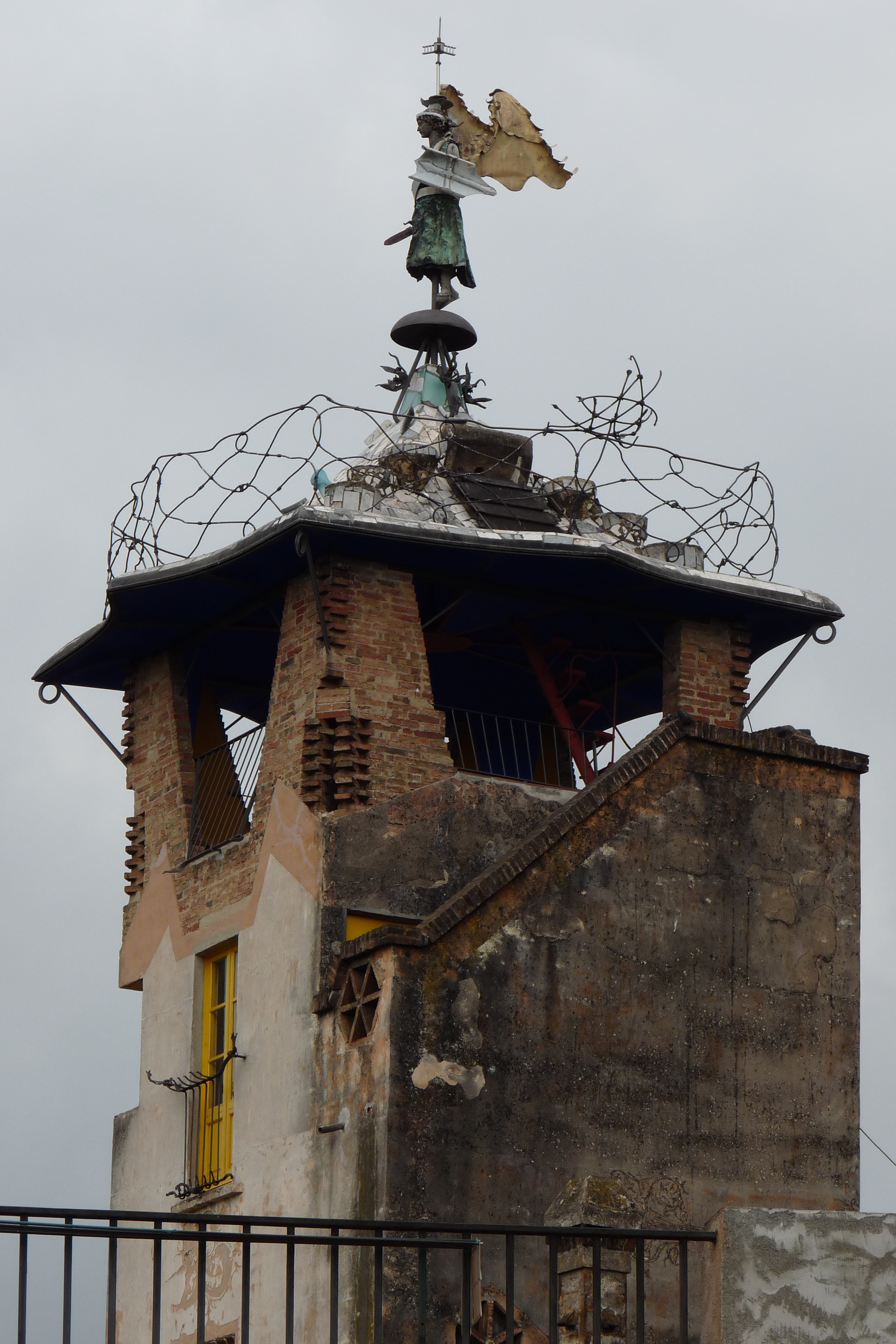

- Flag Coat of arms

- Location in Catalonia Els Pallaresos (Catalonia)
- Coordinates: 41°10′32″N 1°16′14″E
- Country: Spain
- Community: Catalonia
- Province: Tarragona
- Comarca: Tarragonès

Government
  - Mayor: Josep Maria Nolla Cabellos (2015)

Area
  - Total: 5.1 km^{2} (2.0 sq mi)
- Elevation: 121 m (397 ft)

Population (2025-01-01)
  - Total: 5,028
  - Density: 990/km^{2} (2,600/sq mi)
- Demonym: Pallaresenc
- Postal code: 43012
- Website: ajuntamentdelspallaresos.cat

Els Pallaresos (Catalan pronunciation: [əls pəʎəˈɾɛzus]) is a municipality in the comarca of the Tarragonès in Catalonia, Spain. It has a population of 5,028 (register office, 2025).

It is home to several buildings by Modernist architect Josep Maria Jujol.

== Bibliography ==
- Panareda Clopés, Josep Maria; Rios Calvet, Jaume; Rabella Vives, Josep Maria (1989). Guia de Catalunya, Barcelona: Caixa de Catalunya. ISBN 84-87135-02-1 (Catalan). ISBN 84-87135-01-3 (Spanish).
