= La Riera de Gaià =

- Municipality
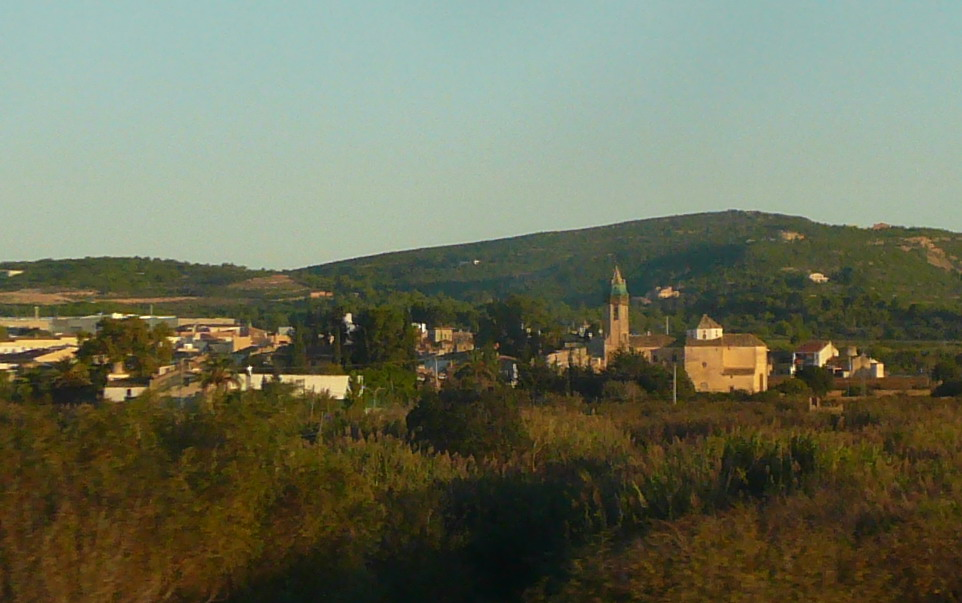

- Flag Coat of arms

- Location in Catalonia La Riera de Gaià (Spain)
- Coordinates: 41°10′4″N 1°21′43″E
- Country: Spain
- Community: Catalonia
- Province: Tarragona
- Comarca: Tarragonès

Government
  - Mayor: Joanet Casas (2023-)

Area
  - Total: 8.8 km^{2} (3.4 sq mi)
- Elevation: 28 m (92 ft)

Population (2025-01-01)
  - Total: 1,834
  - Density: 210/km^{2} (540/sq mi)
- Demonym: Rierenc
- Postal code: 43762
- Website: www.rieradegaia.oasi.org

La Riera de Gaià (Catalan pronunciation: [lə riˈeɾə ðə ɣəˈja]) is a municipality in the comarca of the Tarragonès in Catalonia, Spain. It has a population of 1,834 (register office, 2025).

== Bibliography ==
- Panareda Clopés, Josep Maria; Rios Calvet, Jaume; Rabella Vives, Josep Maria (1989). Guia de Catalunya, Barcelona: Caixa de Catalunya. ISBN 84-87135-02-1 (Catalan). ISBN 84-87135-01-3 (Spanish).
