= Renau, Spain =

Renau
- Municipality
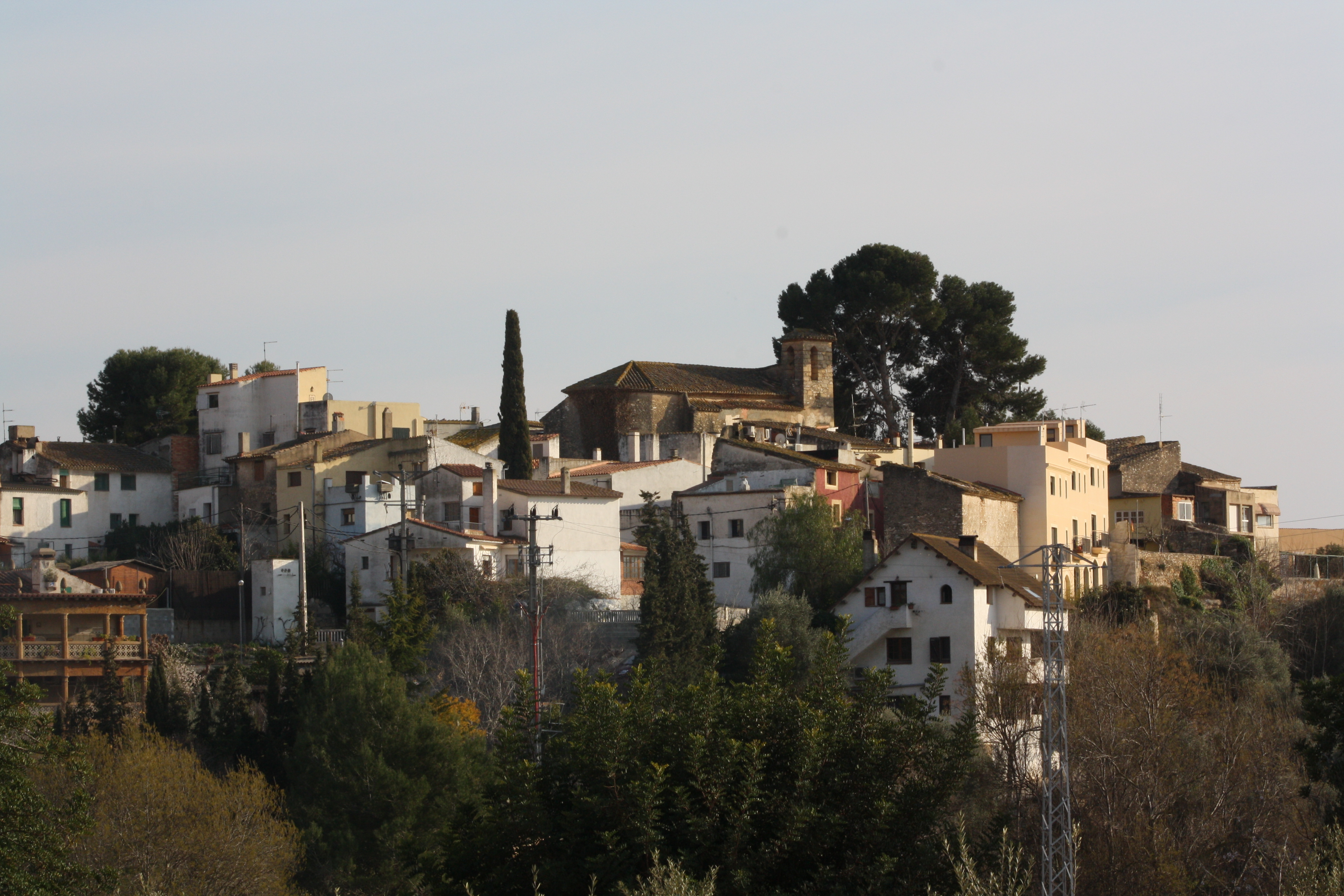

- Coat of arms

- Location in Catalonia
- Coordinates: 41°13′N 1°19′E
- Country: Spain
- Community: Catalonia
- Province: Tarragona
- Comarca: Tarragonès

Government
  - Mayor: Rosa Ma. Pares Yago (2015)

Area
  - Total: 8.2 km^{2} (3.2 sq mi)
- Elevation: 204 m (669 ft)

Population (2025-01-01)
  - Total: 165
  - Density: 20/km^{2} (52/sq mi)
- Postal code: 43886
- Website: www.renau.altanet.org

Renau (Catalan pronunciation: [rəˈnaw]) is a municipality in the comarca of the Tarragonès in Catalonia, Spain. It has a population of 165 (register office, 2025).

It is situated on the right bank of the Gaià river, which is dammed to form the Gaià reservoir. A local road links the village with Vilabella and with the N-240 road between Tarragona and Valls.

== Bibliography ==
- Panareda Clopés, Josep Maria; Rios Calvet, Jaume; Rabella Vives, Josep Maria (1989). Guia de Catalunya, Barcelona: Caixa de Catalunya. ISBN 84-87135-01-3 (Spanish). ISBN 84-87135-02-1 (Catalan).
