= Pol Domingo =

Spanish footballer

Personal information
- Full name: Pol Domingo Ciuraneta
- Date of birth: 4 November 1999 (age 27)
- Place of birth: La Pobla de Montornès, Spain
- Height: 1.80 m (5 ft 11 in)
- Positions: Centre-back; right-back

Team information
- Current team: Alcorcón
- Number: 2

Youth career
- 2008–2018: Gimnàstic

Senior career*
Years	Team	Apps	(Gls)
2018–2020	Pobla Mafumet	49	(0)
2020–2025	Gimnàstic	135	(3)
2025–	Alcorcón	30	(1)
- * Club domestic league appearances and goals as of 10 June 2026

Pol Domingo Ciuraneta (born 4 November 1999) is a Spanish professional footballer who plays as either a centre-back or a right-back for AD Alcorcón.

== Career ==
Domingo was born in La Pobla de Montornès, Tarragona, Catalonia, and joined Gimnàstic de Tarragona's youth setup in 2008, aged eight. He made his senior debut with farm team CF Pobla de Mafumet on 14 January 2018, starting in a 1–1 Tercera División away draw against EC Granollers.

Domingo was definitely promoted to the squad of Pobla ahead of the 2018–19 campaign, and subsequently established himself as a regular for the side before renewing his contract with Nàstic until 2019 on 4 December 2019. He made his first team debut the following 11 January, playing the full 90 minutes in a 3–1 home loss against Real Zaragoza, for the season's Copa del Rey.

Domingo started the 2020–21 season as a permanent member of the first team squad, and established himself as a regular under Toni Seligrat. He scored his first senior goal on 28 March 2021, netting the opener in a 2–1 away loss to UE Cornellà.

On 17 August 2022, Domingo further extended his link with Gimnàstic until 2025. On 7 July 2025, he moved to fellow league team AD Alcorcón, after his contract expired.

== Personal life ==
Domingo's twin brother Joan is also a footballer and a defender. He too was groomed at Nàstic.
