= El Catllar =

- Municipality
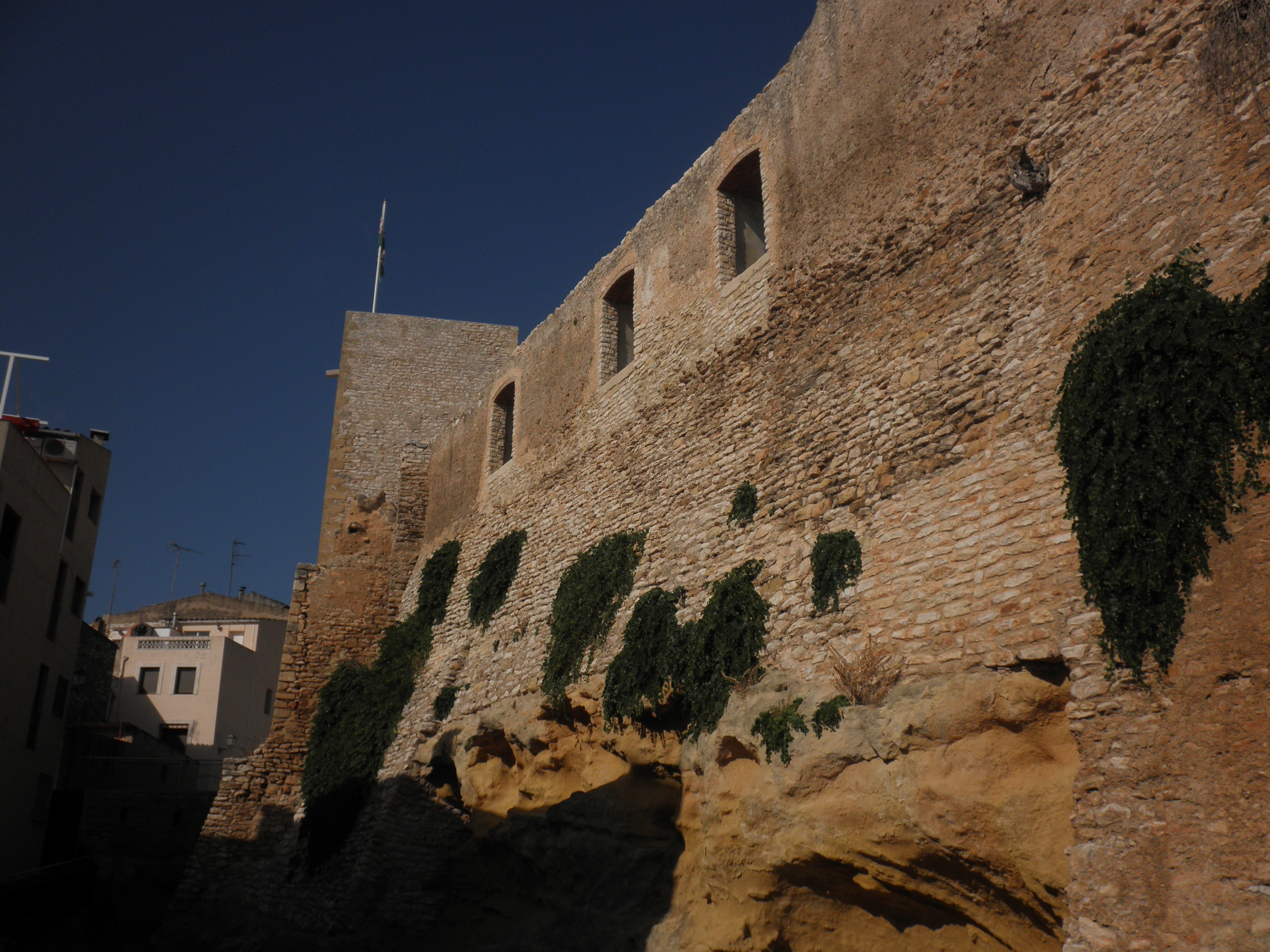

- Flag Coat of arms

- Location in Catalonia
- Coordinates: 41°10′37″N 1°19′37″E
- Country: Spain
- Community: Catalonia
- Province: Tarragona
- Comarca: Tarragonès

Government
  - Mayor: Joan Morlà Mensa (Republican Left of Catalonia)

Area
  - Total: 26.4 km^{2} (10.2 sq mi)
- Elevation: 59 m (194 ft)

Population (2025-01-01)
  - Total: 5,375
  - Density: 204/km^{2} (527/sq mi)
- Demonym: Catllarenc
- Postal code: 43764
- Website: elcatllar.cat

El Catllar (Catalan pronunciation: [əl kəʎˈʎa]) is a municipality in the comarca of the Tarragonès in Catalonia, Spain. It has a population of 5,375 (register office, 2025).

It is around 9 km north east of Tarragona, and around 70 km west of Barcelona. The municipality has an exclave to the east.

== Bibliography ==
- Panareda Clopés, Josep Maria; Rios Calvet, Jaume; Rabella Vives, Josep Maria (1989). Guia de Catalunya, Barcelona: Caixa de Catalunya. ISBN 84-87135-02-1 (Catalan). ISBN 84-87135-01-3 (Spanish).
