= Llavorsí =

- Municipality
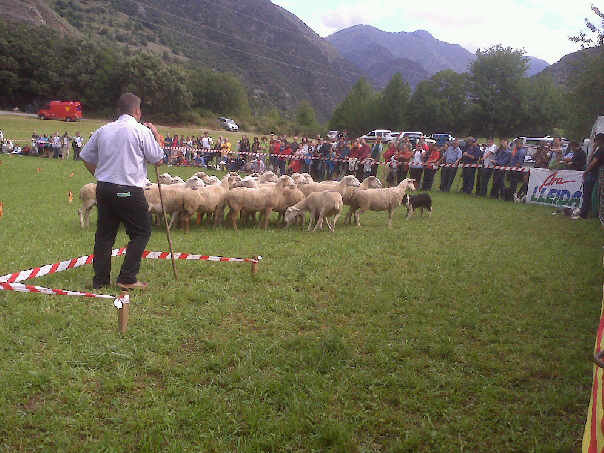
- Sheepdog trials at Llavorsí

- Flag Coat of arms

- Location in Catalonia
- Coordinates: 42°30′N 1°13′E
- Country: Spain
- Community: Catalonia
- Province: Lleida
- Comarca: Pallars Sobirà

Government
  - Mayor: Josep Vidal Bringué (2015)

Area
  - Total: 68.5 km^{2} (26.4 sq mi)

Population (2025-01-01)
  - Total: 342
  - Density: 4.99/km^{2} (12.9/sq mi)
- Website: llavorsi.ddl.net

Llavorsí (Catalan pronunciation: [ʎaβoɾˈsi]) is a village and municipi (municipality) in the province of Lleida and autonomous community of Catalonia, Spain. It has a population of 342 (register office, 2025).
