= Tarragonès =

Coordinates: 41°09′12″N 1°17′28″E

- Comarca
- Country: Spain
- Autonomous community: Catalonia
- Region: Camp de Tarragona
- Province: Tarragona
- Capital: Tarragona
- Municipalities: List: Altafulla, La Canonja, El Catllar, Constantí, Creixell, El Morell, La Nou de Gaià, Els Pallaresos, Perafort, La Pobla de Mafumet, La Pobla de Montornès, Renau, La Riera de Gaià, Roda de Berà, Salomó, Salou, La Secuita, Tarragona, Torredembarra, Vespella de Gaià, Vila-seca, Vilallonga del Camp

Government
  - Body: Tarragonès Comarcal Council
  - President: Salvador Ferré (PSC) (2023-2025); Joan Martí (Junts) (2025-2027)

Area
  - Total: 319.2 km^{2} (123.2 sq mi)

Population (2025)
  - Total: 279,332
  - Density: 875.1/km^{2} (2,266/sq mi)
- Demonym
- Time zone: UTC+1 (CET)
  - Summer (DST): UTC+2 (CEST)
- Largest municipality: Tarragona

Tarragonès (Catalan pronunciation: [tərəɣuˈnɛs]) is a comarca (county) in Camp de Tarragona, Catalonia (Spain). It lies on the Mediterranean coast, between the comarques of Baix Penedès to the northeast and Baix Camp to the south. Over 60% of the population live in the capital, Tarragona.

== Transport ==
An excellent road network connects the comarca's towns. The AP-7/E-15 motorway cuts across the region, following the coastline. The port of Tarragona is an important Mediterranean transit point. There are yacht marinas in Tarragona and Torredembarra, with a smaller one at Salou. There is a rail connection with the cities of Barcelona and Valencia.

== Municipalities ==
Municipality	Population (2025)	Area km^{2}
Altafulla	5,856	7.0
La Canonja	5,993	7.3
El Catllar	5,387	26.4
Constantí	7,155	30.9
Creixell	4,244	10.5
El Morell	3,811	5.9
La Nou de Gaià	602	4.3
Els Pallaresos	5,043	5.1
Perafort	1,353	9.5
La Pobla de Mafumet	4,187	6.2
La Pobla de Montornès	3,470	12.3
Renau	165	8.2
La Riera de Gaià	1,831	8.8
Roda de Berà	8,240	16.5
Salomó	525	12.2
Salou	31,018	15.1
La Secuita	1,848	17.8
Tarragona	143,260	57.9
Torredembarra	18,190	8.7
Vespella de Gaià	502	18.0
Vila-seca	24,158	21.6
Vilallonga del Camp	2,494	9.0
• Total: 22	279,332	319.2
