= El Morell =

- Municipality
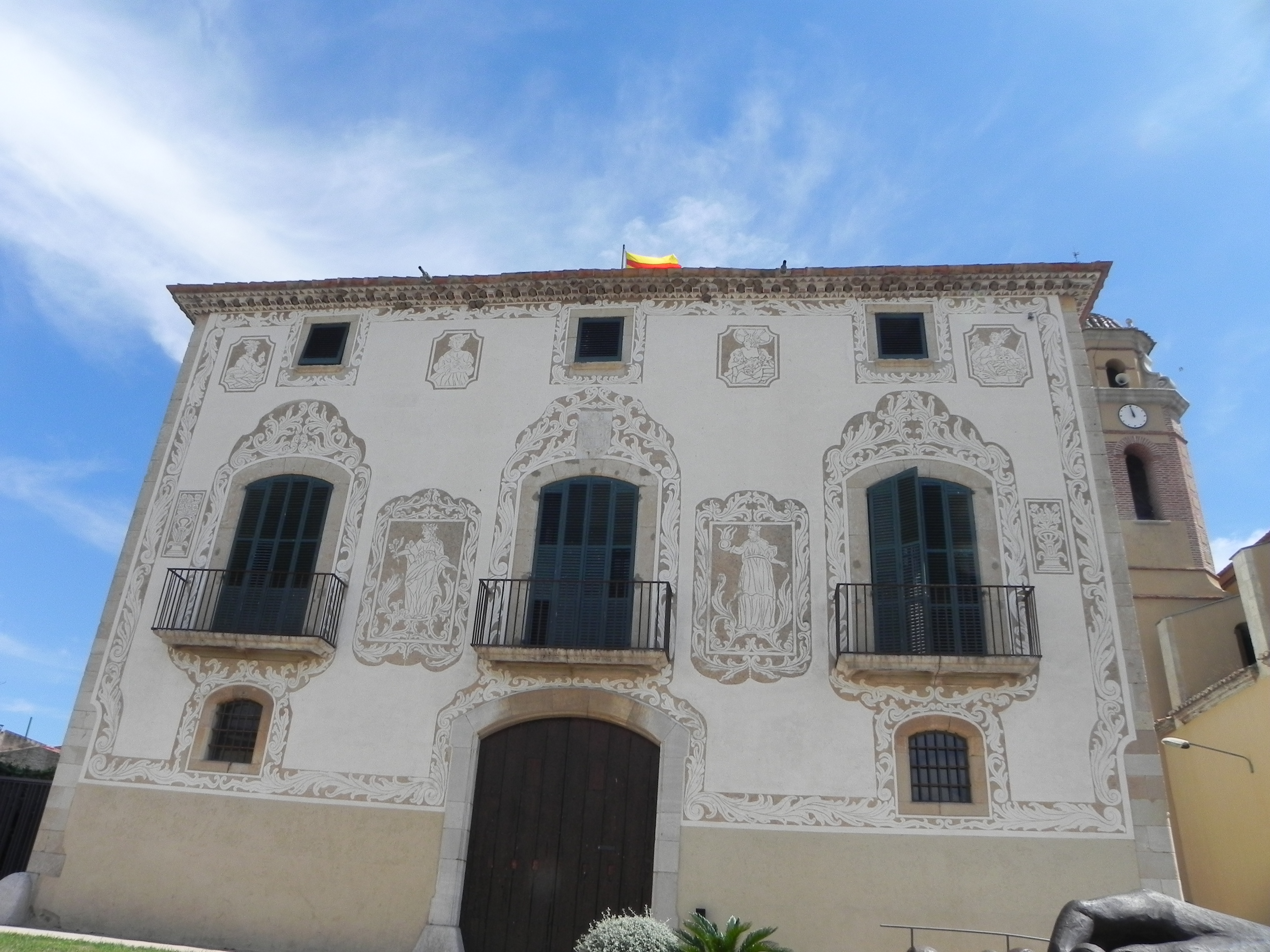
- Casal dels Montoliu.

- Coat of arms

- Location in Catalonia El Morell (Spain)
- Coordinates: 41°11′37″N 1°12′42″E
- Country: Spain
- Community: Catalonia
- Province: Tarragona
- Comarca: Tarragonès

Government
  - Mayor: Pere Guinovart Dalmau (2015)

Area
  - Total: 5.9 km^{2} (2.3 sq mi)
- Elevation: 99 m (325 ft)

Population (2025-01-01)
  - Total: 3,811
  - Density: 650/km^{2} (1,700/sq mi)
- Demonym: Morellenc
- Postal code: 43760
- Website: www.morell.cat

El Morell (Catalan pronunciation: [əl muˈɾeʎ]) is a village in the province of Tarragona and autonomous community of Catalonia, Spain. The municipality has two exclaves to the west. It has a population of 3,811 (register office, 2025).
