= Creixell =

- Municipality
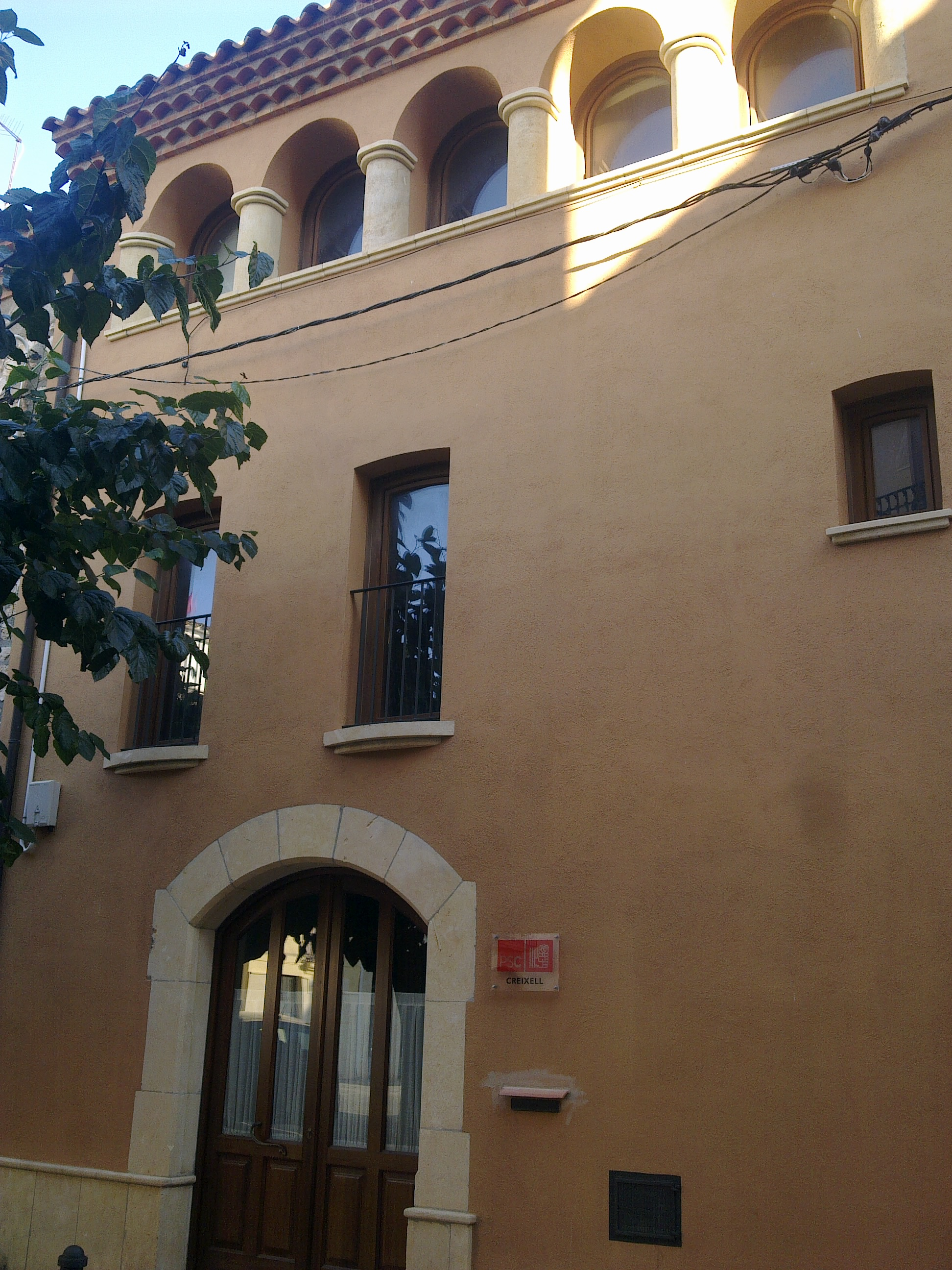
- Cal Xacó house, Creixell

- Flag Coat of arms

- Location in Spain Creixell (Spain)
- Coordinates: 41°10′10″N 1°26′32″E
- Country: Spain
- Community: Catalonia
- Province: Tarragona
- Comarca: Tarragonès

Government
  - mayor: Montserrat Muñoz Madueño (2023)

Area
  - Total: 10.5 km^{2} (4.1 sq mi)
- Elevation: 48 m (157 ft)

Population (2025-01-01)
  - Total: 4,261
  - Density: 406/km^{2} (1,050/sq mi)
- Demonym: Creixellenc
- Postal code: 43839
- Website: www.creixell.cat

Creixell (Catalan pronunciation: [kɾəˈʃeʎ]) is a municipality in the province of Tarragona, in the autonomous community of Catalonia, Spain. It is a small town with a population of 4,261 (register office, 2025); mostly elder ones.
