= La Pobla de Montornès =

- Municipality
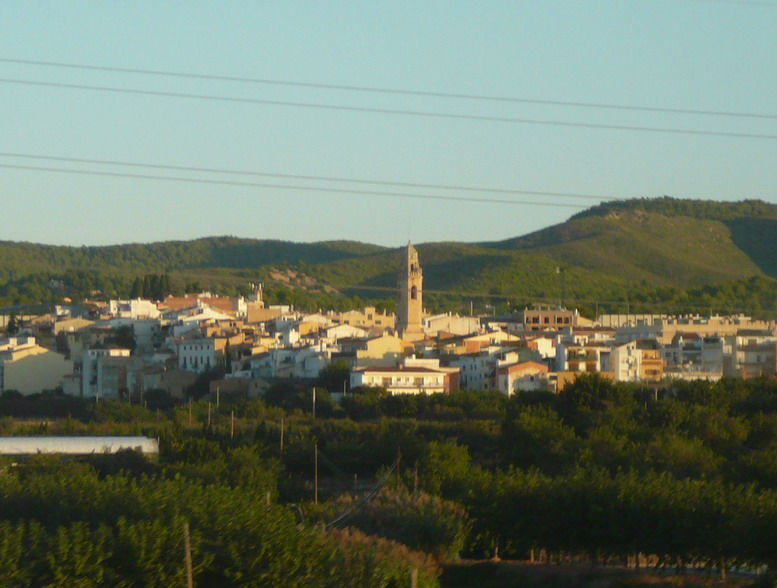

- Flag Coat of arms

- Location in Catalonia
- Coordinates: 41°10′48″N 1°24′57″E
- Country: Spain
- Community: Catalonia
- Province: Tarragona
- Comarca: Tarragonès

Government
  - mayor: Josep Maria Santamaria Puig (2015)

Area
  - Total: 12.3 km^{2} (4.7 sq mi)
- Elevation: 67 m (220 ft)

Population (2025-01-01)
  - Total: 3,440
  - Density: 280/km^{2} (724/sq mi)
- Demonym: Poblenc
- Postal code: 43761
- Website: www.pmontornes.altanet.org

La Pobla de Montornès (Catalan pronunciation: [lə ˈpobːlə ðə muntuɾˈnɛs]) is a village in the province of Tarragona, in the autonomous community of Catalonia, Spain. It has a population of 3,440 (register office, 2025).
