= Urgellet =

Coordinates: 42°21′26.44″N 1°27′30.41″E

- Natural region
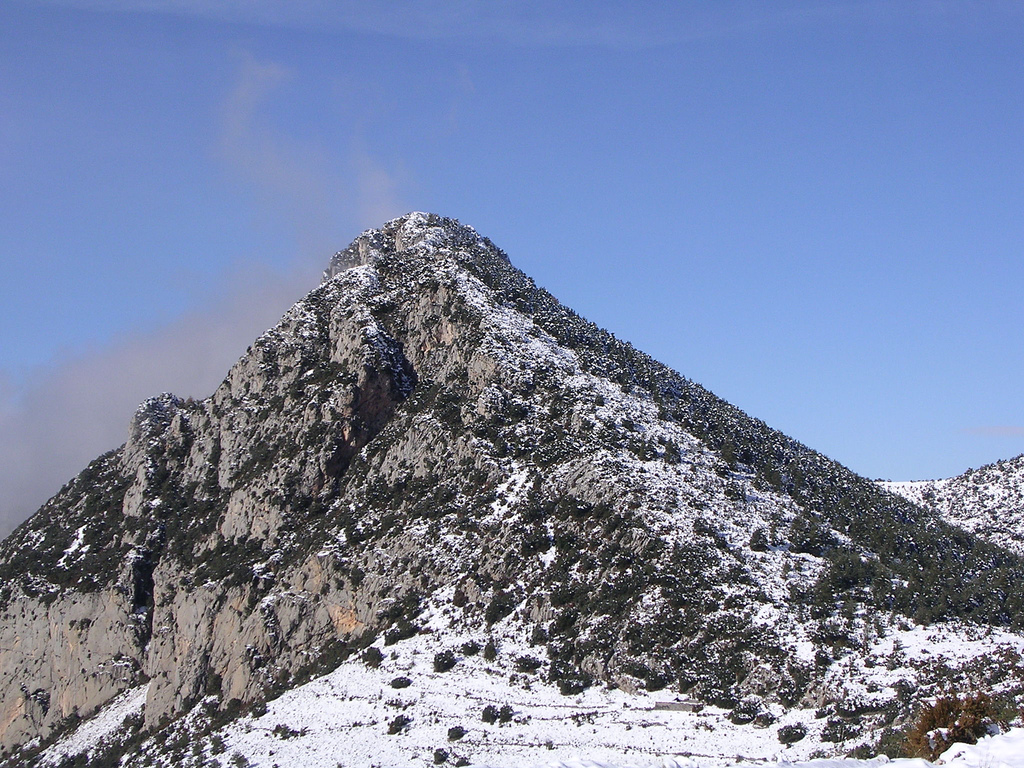
- Landscape of the Roc de Galliner mountain in the Urgellet region.

- A map of Catalonia showing the Urgellet location
- Country: Catalonia, Spain
- Elevation: 800 m (2,600 ft)

Baridà (in blue) inside administrative comarcas of Baixa Cerdanya (in green) and Alt Urgell (in light yellow Urgellet, in yellow southern Alt Urgell)

Urgellet (Catalan pronunciation: [uɾdʒeˈʎet]) is a historical territory and a natural region of Catalonia. It is located in the Pyrenees exactly in the actual administrative comarca of Alt Urgell, that last includes Baridà, Urgellet and the banks of Oliana, Peramola and Bassella.

== Geography ==
The mountainous territory of Urgellet is almost wholly part of the Alt Urgell, except for the eastern Baridà and the southern sector. The Mollet Gorge is the natural boundary between the Urgellet and Baridà.

The history of Urgellet is highly related to Sedes Urgelli (La Seu d'Urgell or city of Urgell), the Bishop of Urgell and the County of Urgell. In the latter case, the territory Urgellet was leading the county, with capital in la Seu d'Urgell, and extended southwards up to the comarques of Urgell and Pla d'Urgell, among others. For this reason some towns and two comarques in Lleida contain the name of Urgell that has its origin in the city of Urgell and Urgellet region.

== Etymology ==
The name Urgell has a specifically Pyrenean pre-Roman origin. Linguist Joan Coromines interprets the meaning as related to the presence of water.

== Municipalities inside Urgellet ==
- Alàs i Cerc
- Arsèguel
- Cabó
- Cava (el Querforadat town is inside the municipality of Cava but from Baridà region)
- Coll de Nargó
- Estamariu
- Fígols i Alinyà
- Josa i Tuixén
- Montferrer i Castellbò
- Organyà
- Ribera d'Urgellet
- La Seu d'Urgell
- Les Valls d'Aguilar
- Les Valls de Valira
- La Vansa i Fórnols
