= Alàs =

- village
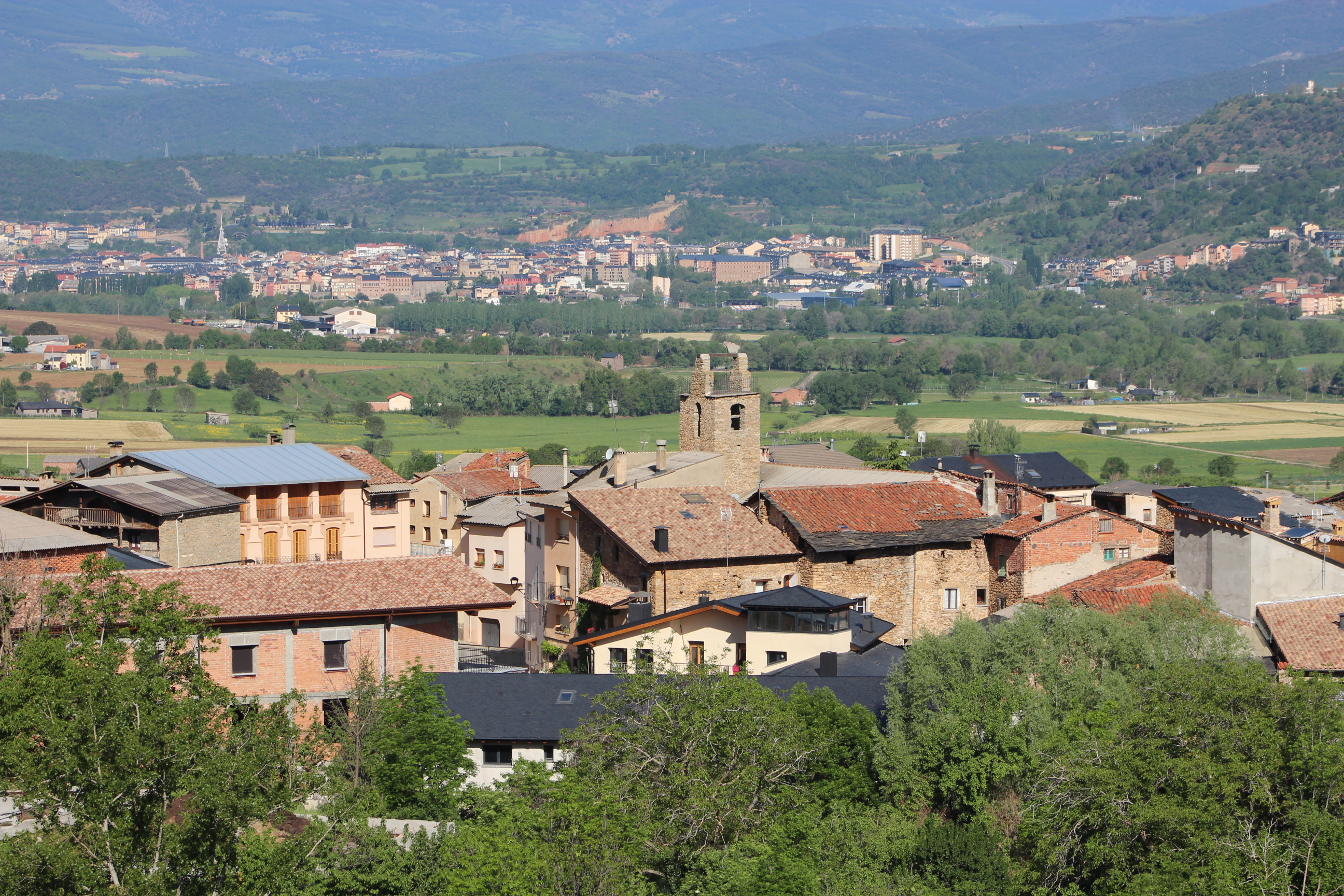

- Location in Catalonia
- Coordinates: 42°21′6″N 1°30′18″E
- Country: Spain
- Community: Catalonia
- Province: Lleida
- Comarca: Alt Urgell
- Municipality: Alàs i Cerc

Population (2007)
  - Total: 228

Alàs is a village in the municipality of Alàs i Cerc in the comarca of Alt Urgell, Lleida, Catalonia, Spain.
