= Ansovell =

- Village
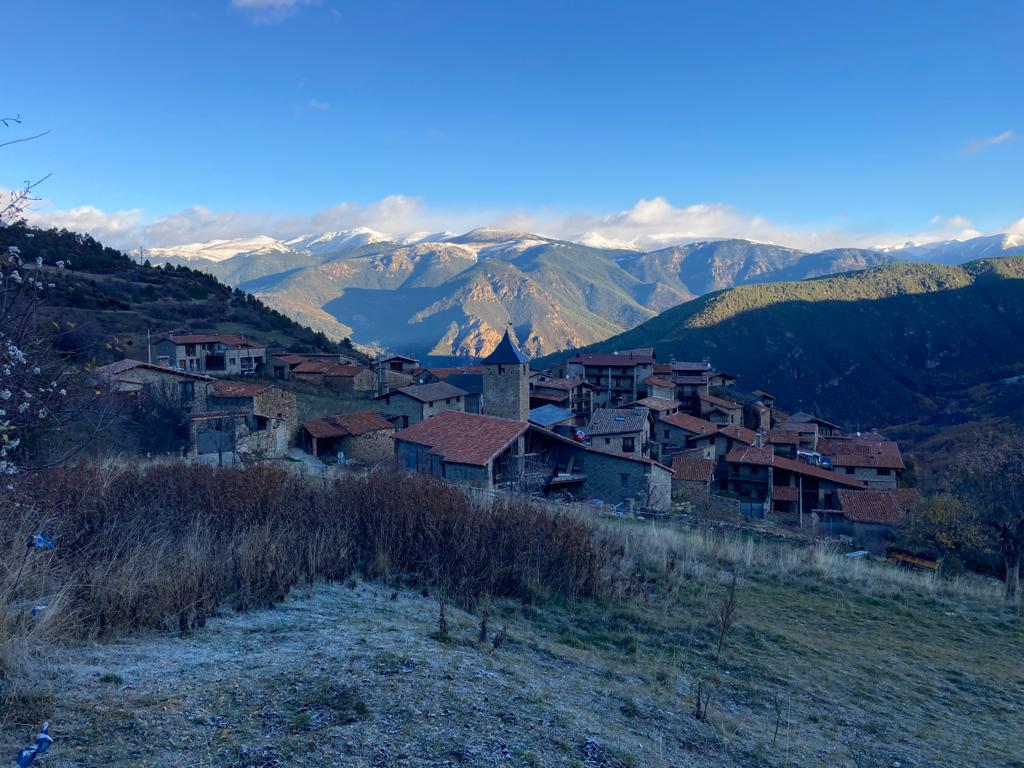

- Location within Province of Lleida Location within Catalonia Location within Spain
- Coordinates: 42°19′31″N 1°35′3″E
- Country: Spain
- Community: Catalonia
- Province: Lleida
- Municipality: Cava, Lleida
- Elevation: 1,338 m (4,390 ft)

Population
  - Total: 24

Ansovell is a village located in the municipality of Cava, Lleida, in Province of Lleida province, Catalonia, Spain. As of 2020, it has a population of 24.

== Geography ==
Ansovell is located 158km northeast of Lleida. It has an elevation above sea level of 1338m, and can be reached by road from Arsèguel.
