= Fígols i Alinyà =

- Municipality
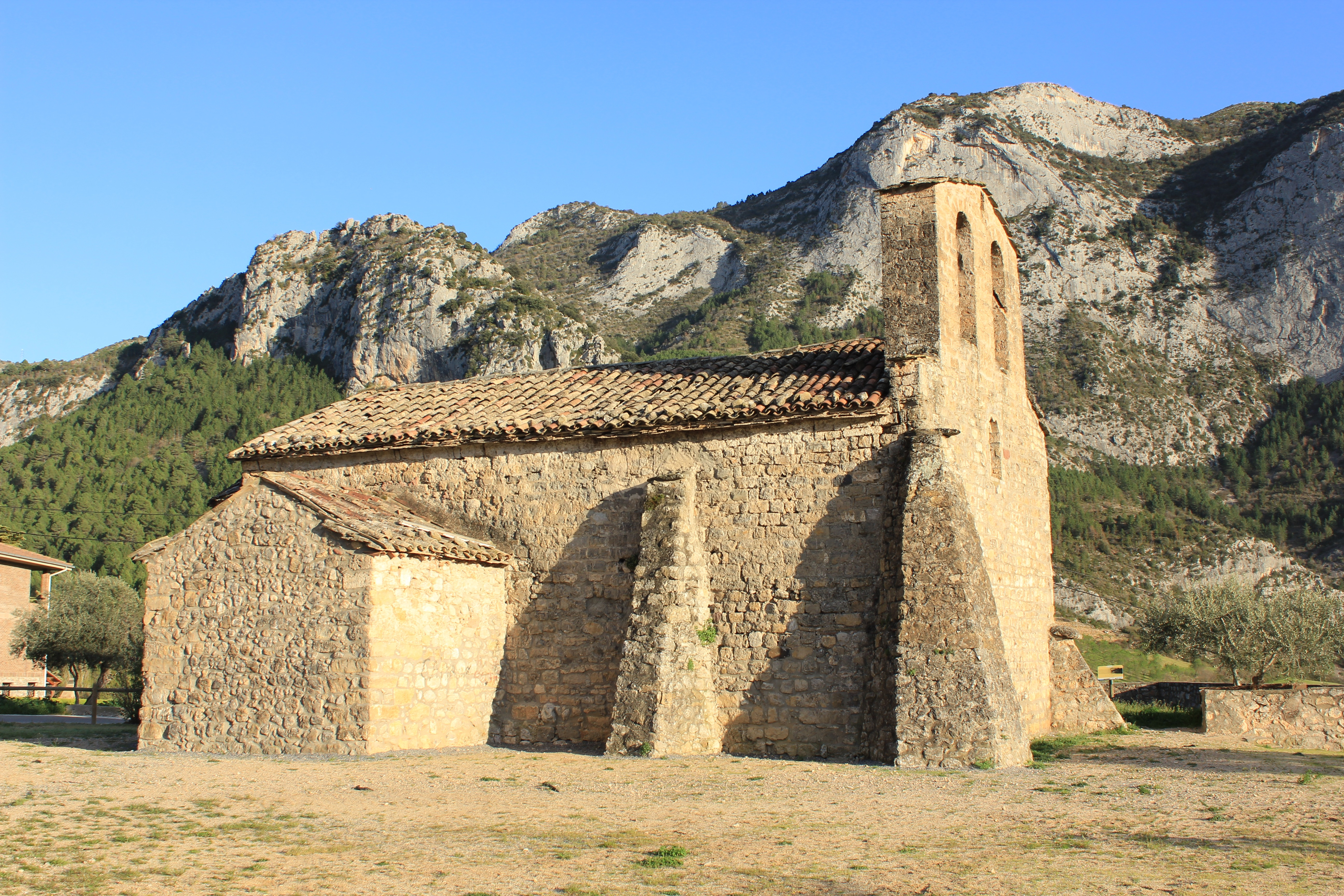
- Església de Sant Víctor de Fígols

- Coat of arms

- Location in the Province of Lleida Location in Catalonia Location in Spain
- Coordinates: 42°12′18″N 1°20′31″E
- Country: Spain
- Community: Catalonia
- Province: Lleida
- Comarca: Alt Urgell

Government
  - Alcalde: Ignasi Finestres Baronet (ERC)

Area
  - Total: 101.8 km^{2} (39.3 sq mi)
- Elevation: 602 m (1,975 ft)

Population (2025-01-01)
  - Total: 234
  - Density: 2.30/km^{2} (5.95/sq mi)
- Website: figolsalinya.ddl.net

Fígols i Alinyà (Catalan pronunciation: [ˈfiɣolz i aliˈɲa]) is a municipality in the comarca of the Alt Urgell in Catalonia, Spain. It is situated on the left bank of the Segre river between Coll de Nargó and Organyà, just above the Oliana reservoir. The municipality was formed in 1972 by the merger of the municipalities of Fígols d'Organyà and Alinyà: the ajuntament (town hall) is in Fígols. A local road links the municipality with Organyà. It has a population of 234 (register office, 2025).

== Subdivisions ==
The municipality of Fígols i Alinyà is formed of five villages. Populations are given as of 2001:

- Alinyà (70), on the road from Organyà to Bergà
- L'Alzina d'Alinyà (29)
- Canelles (6)
- Fígols (152)
- Perles (16)

== Demography ==
Population figures from before 1972 are the sum of the populations of Fígols d'Organyà and Alinyà.

1900	1930	1950	1970	1986	2007
940	1089	920	576	377	265

== See also ==
- Urgellet
