= Madrona (Pinell de Solsonès) =

- Locality
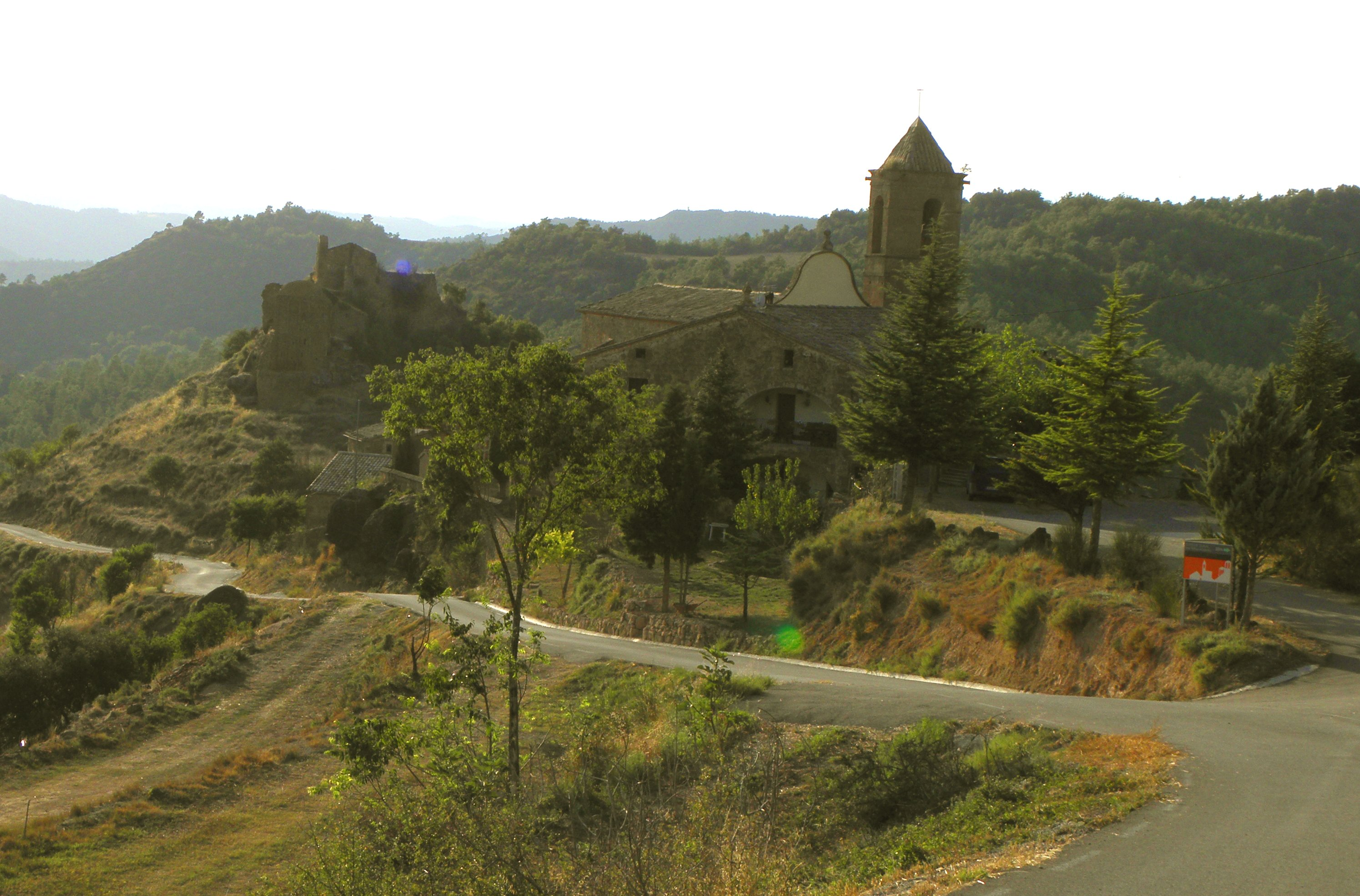

- Location within Province of Lleida Location within Catalonia Location within Spain
- Coordinates: 41°58′15″N 1°20′30″E
- Country: Spain
- Community: Catalonia
- Province: Lleida
- Municipality: Pinell de Solsonès
- Elevation: 504 m (1,654 ft)

Population
  - Total: 27

Madrona is a locality located in the municipality of Pinell de Solsonès, in Province of Lleida province, Catalonia, Spain. As of 2020, it has a population of 27.

== Geography ==
Madrona is located 90km east-northeast of Lleida.
