= Canelles =

- Locality
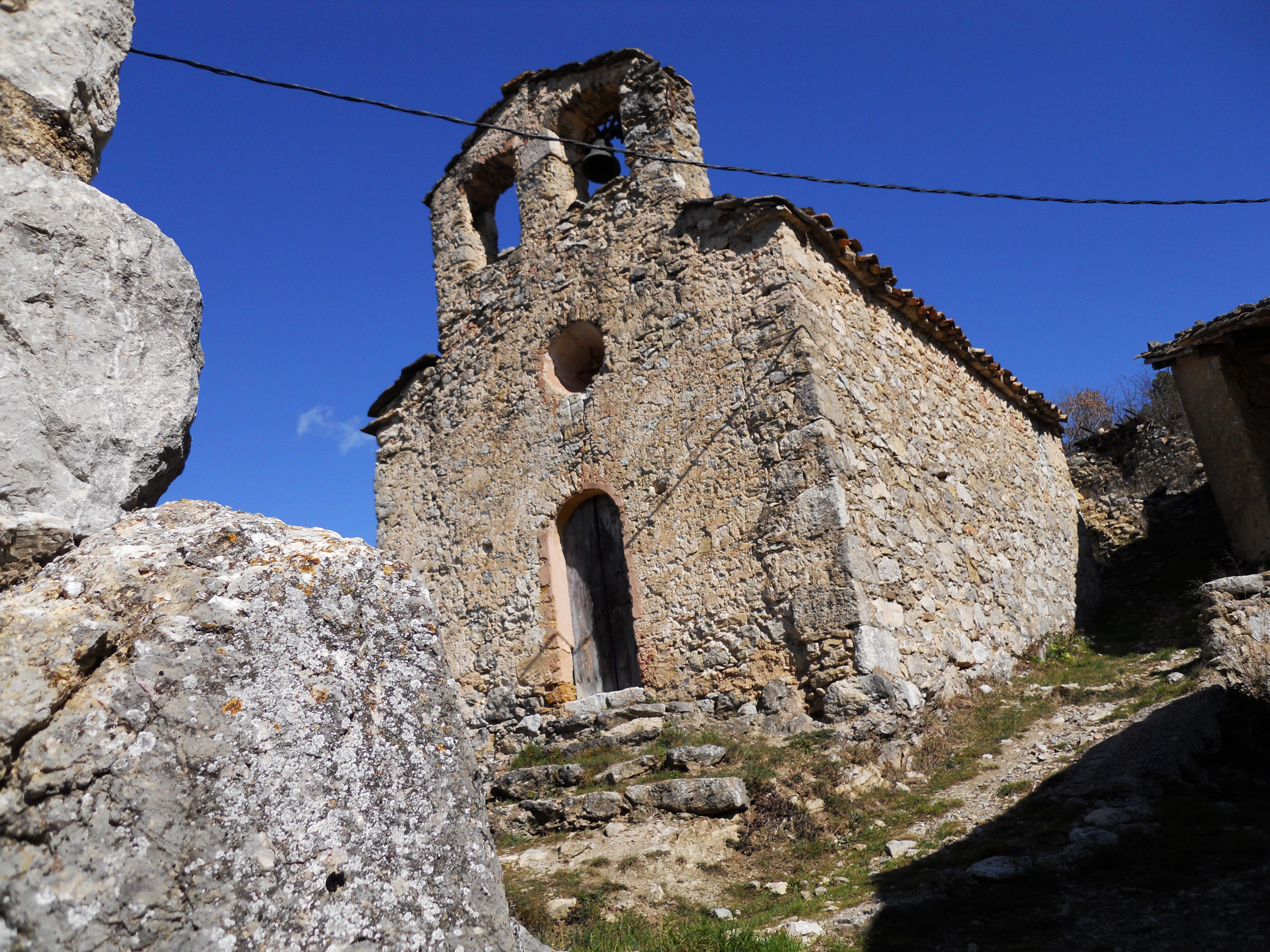

- Location within Province of Lleida Location within Catalonia Location within Spain
- Coordinates: 42°10′38″N 1°21′16″E
- Country: Spain
- Community: Catalonia
- Province: Lleida
- Municipality: Fígols i Alinyà
- Elevation: 663 m (2,175 ft)

Population
  - Total: 4

Canelles is a locality located in the municipality of Fígols i Alinyà, in Province of Lleida province, Catalonia, Spain. As of 2020, it has a population of 4.

== Geography ==
Canelles is located 116km northeast of Lleida.
