= Fórnols de Cadí =

- Locality
- Fórnols
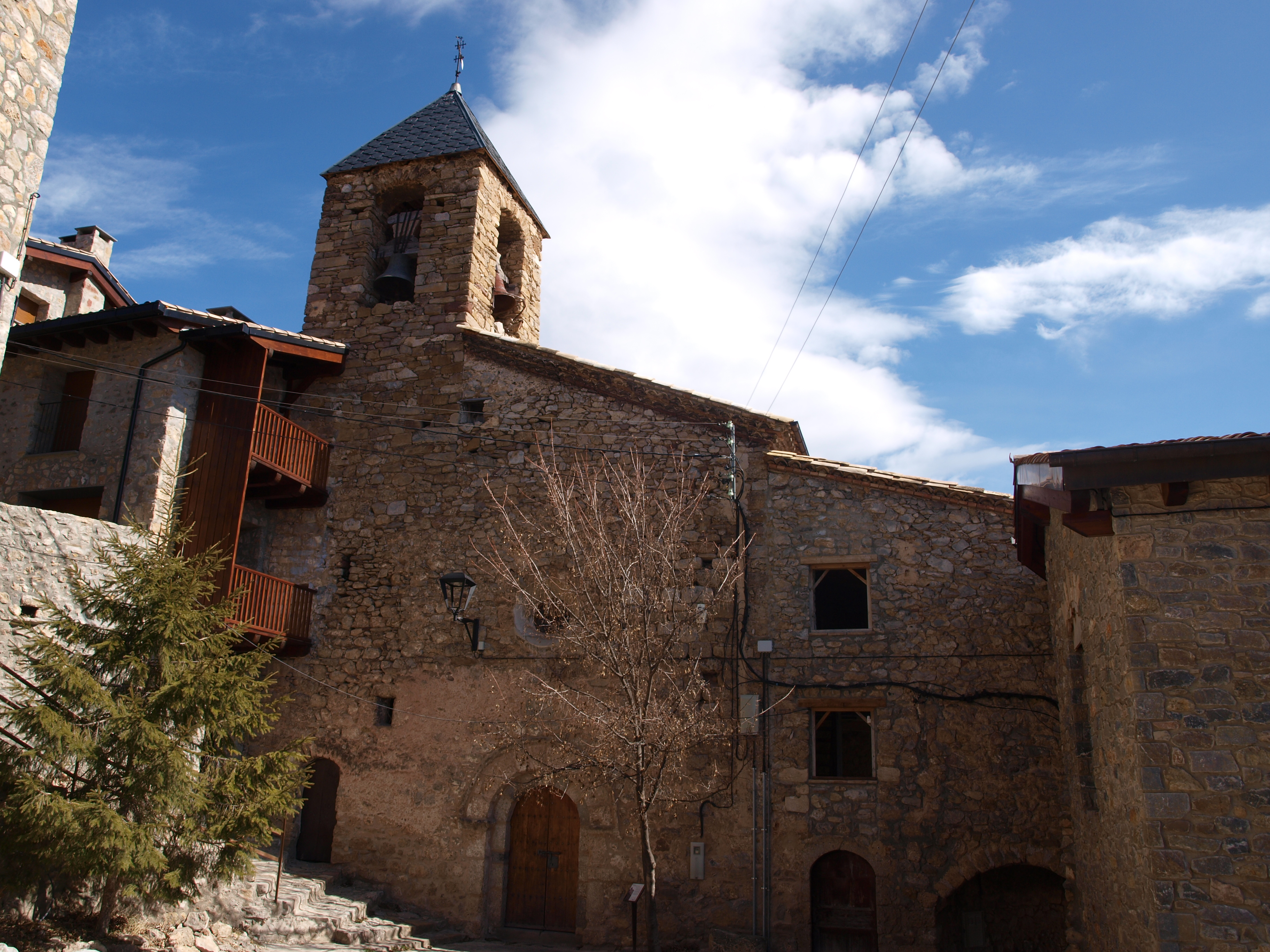

- Location within Province of Lleida Location within Catalonia Location within Spain
- Coordinates: 42°15′11″N 1°30′55″E
- Country: Spain
- Community: Catalonia
- Province: Lleida
- Municipality: La Vansa i Fórnols
- Elevation: 1,291 m (4,236 ft)

Population
  - Total: 19

Fórnols de Cadí or Fórnols is a hamlet located in the municipality of La Vansa i Fórnols, in Province of Lleida province, Catalonia, Spain. As of 2020, it has a population of 19.

== Geography ==
Fórnols de Cadí is located 167km northeast of Lleida.
