= Alinyà =

- Locality
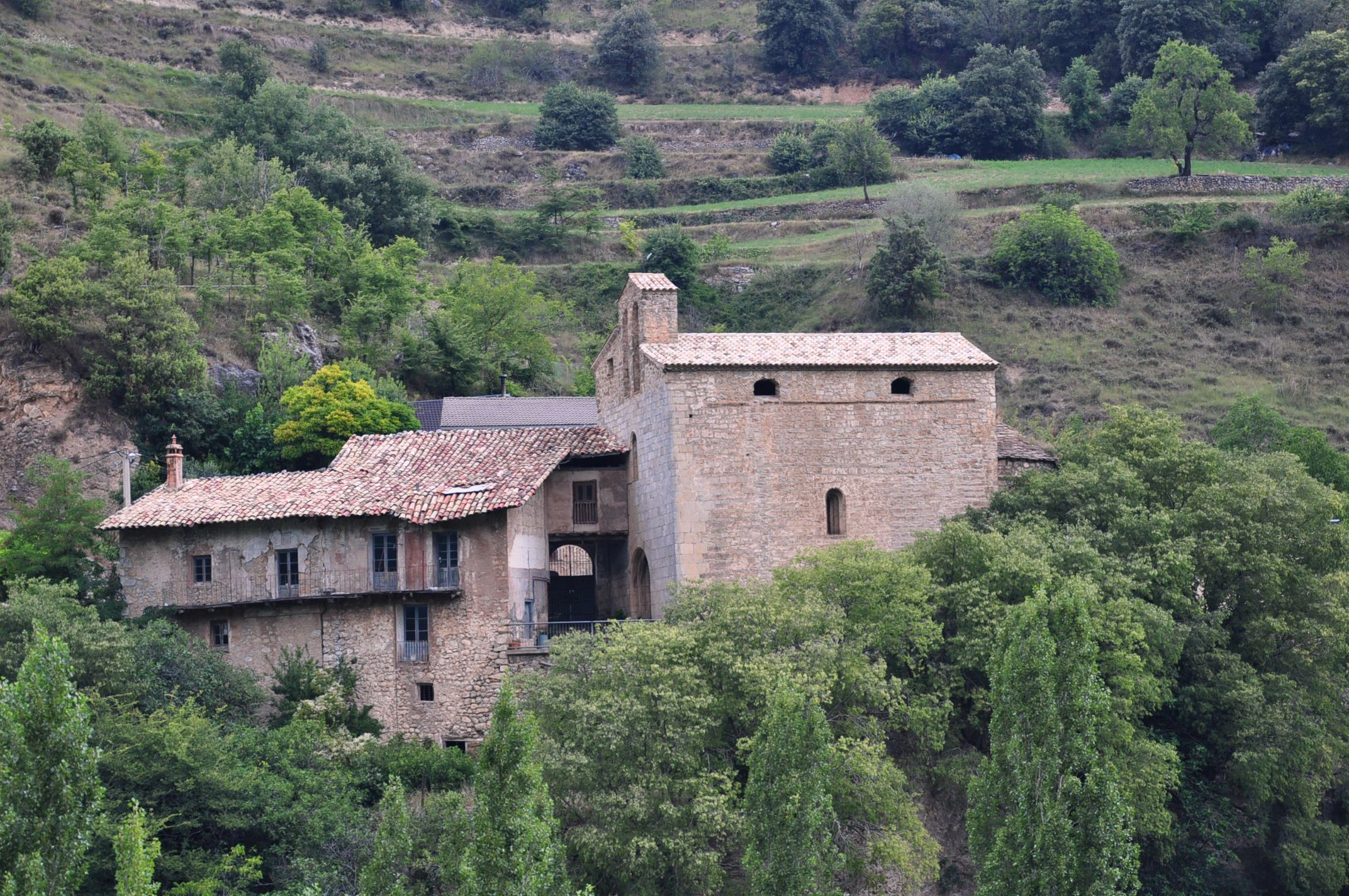

- Location within Province of Lleida Location within Catalonia Location within Spain
- Coordinates: 42°10′49″N 1°25′22″E
- Country: Spain
- Community: Catalonia
- Province: Lleida
- Municipality: Fígols i Alinyà
- Elevation: 954 m (3,130 ft)

Population
  - Total: 44

Alinyà is a locality located in the municipality of Fígols i Alinyà, in Province of Lleida province, Catalonia, Spain. As of 2020, it has a population of 44.

== Geography ==
Alinyà is located 122km northeast of Lleida.
