= Pujal de Cabó =

- Locality
- Location within Province of Lleida Location within Catalonia Location within Spain
- Coordinates: 42°13′19″N 1°18′44″E
- Country: Spain
- Community: Catalonia
- Province: Lleida
- Municipality: Cabó
- Elevation: 636 m (2,087 ft)

Population
  - Total: 16

Pujal de Cabó is a hamlet located in the municipality of Cabó, in Province of Lleida province, Catalonia, Spain. As of 2020, it has a population of 16.

== Geography ==
Pujal de Cabó is located 117km northeast of Lleida.
