= Sisquer =

- Locality
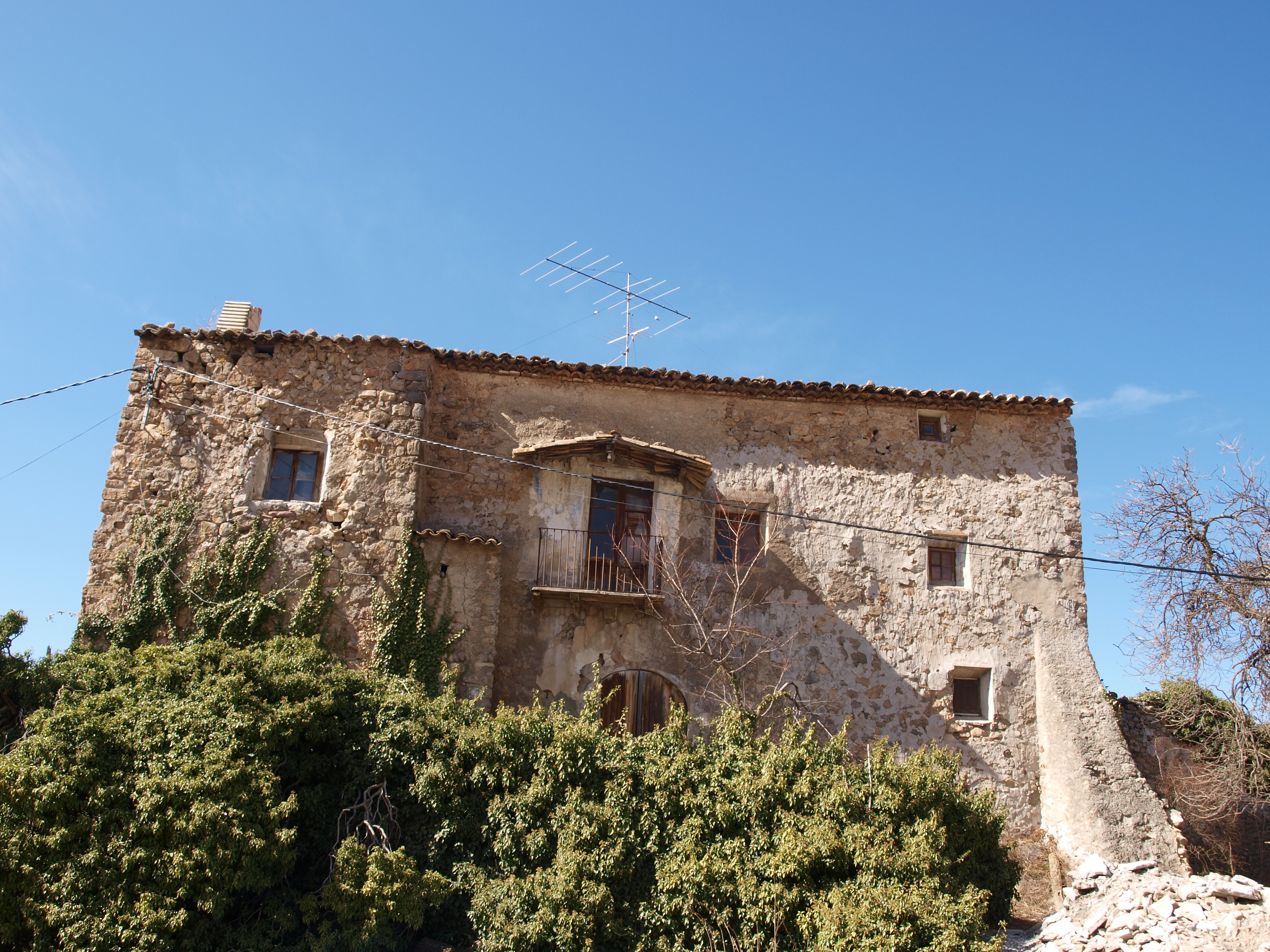

- Location within Province of Lleida Location within Catalonia Location within Spain
- Coordinates: 42°14′53″N 1°28′17″E
- Country: Spain
- Community: Catalonia
- Province: Lleida
- Municipality: La Vansa i Fórnols
- Elevation: 1,171 m (3,842 ft)

Population
  - Total: 15

Sisquer is a locality located in the municipality of La Vansa i Fórnols, in the Province of Lleida province, Catalonia, Spain. As of 2020, it has a population of 15.

== Geography ==
Sisquer is located 168km northeast of Lleida.
