= Sallent (Pinell de Solsonès) =

- Locality
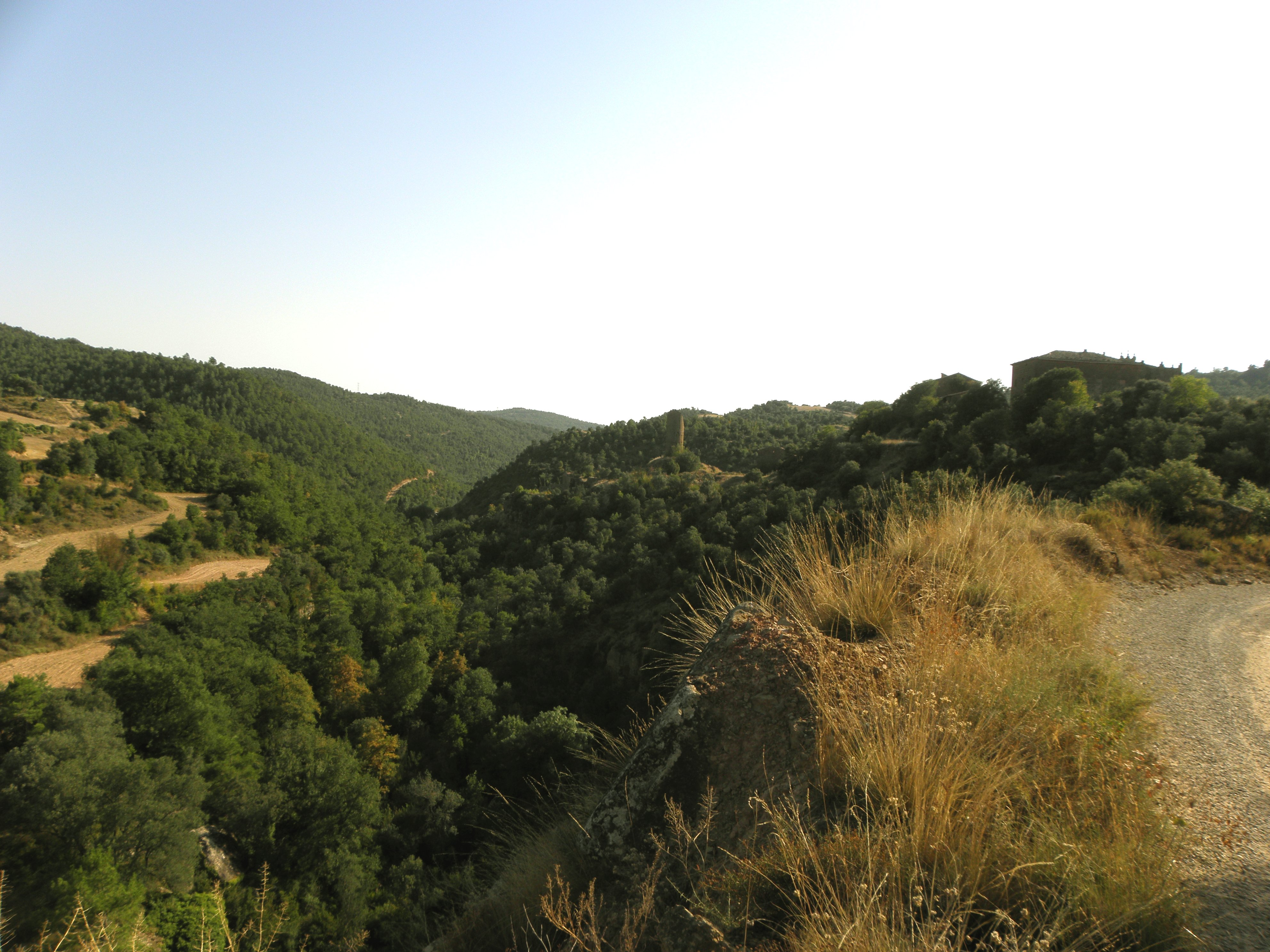

- Location within Province of Lleida Location within Catalonia Location within Spain
- Coordinates: 41°54′17″N 1°20′8″E
- Country: Spain
- Community: Catalonia
- Province: Lleida
- Municipality: Pinell de Solsonès
- Elevation: 495 m (1,624 ft)

Population
  - Total: 25

Sallent is a locality located in the municipality of Pinell de Solsonès, in Province of Lleida province, Catalonia, Spain. As of 2020, it has a population of 25.

== Geography ==
Sallent is located 95km east-northeast of Lleida.
