= Pinell =

- Locality
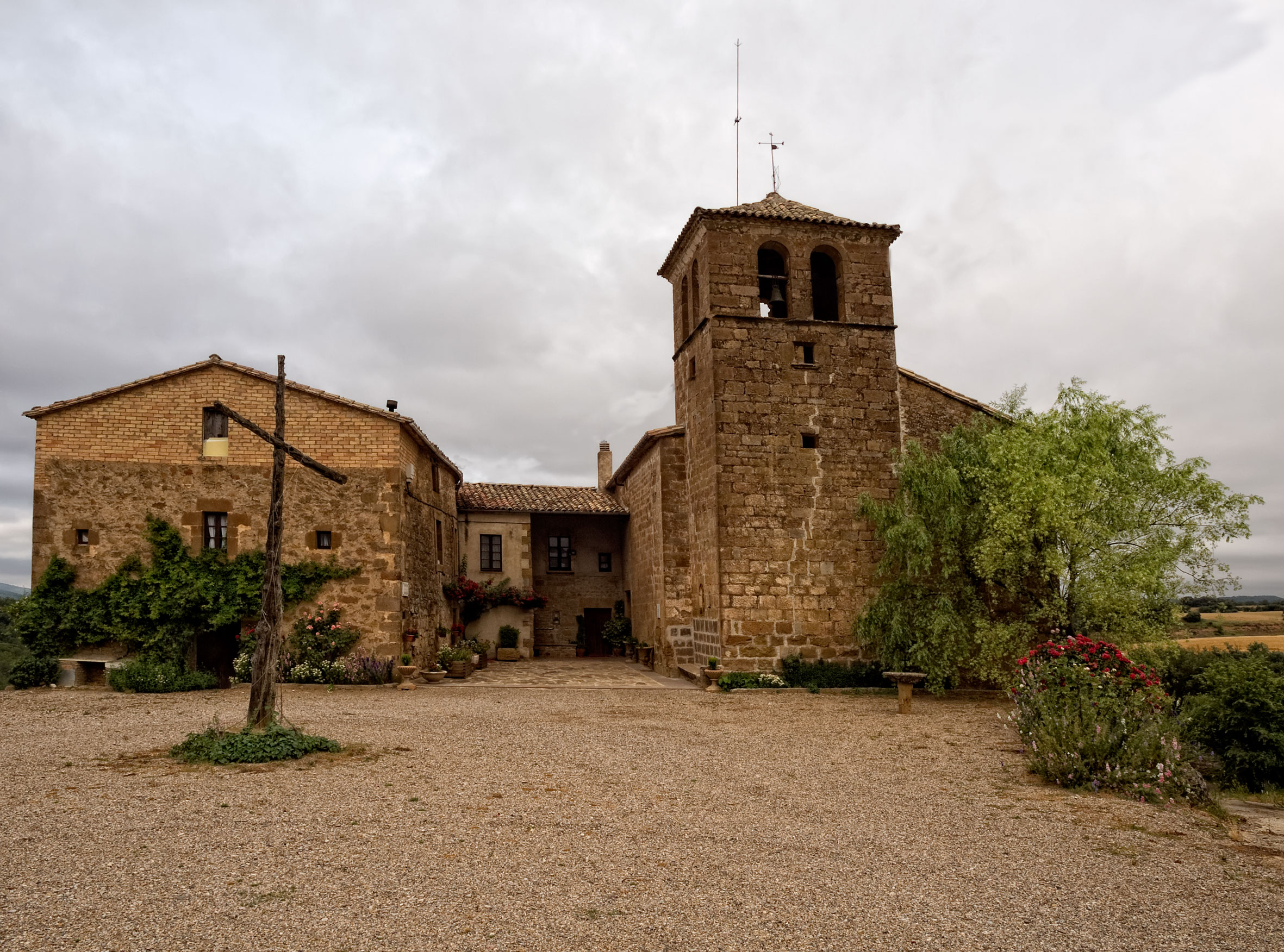

- Location within Province of Lleida Location within Catalonia Location within Spain
- Coordinates: 41°58′16″N 1°23′59″E
- Country: Spain
- Community: Catalonia
- Province: Lleida
- Municipality: Pinell de Solsonès
- Elevation: 647 m (2,123 ft)

Population
  - Total: 23

Pinell is a locality located in the municipality of Pinell de Solsonès, in Province of Lleida province, Catalonia, Spain. As of 2020, it has a population of 23.

== Geography ==
Pinell is located 105km east-northeast of Lleida.
