= Sorribes de la Vansa =

- Locality
- Location within Province of Lleida Location within Catalonia Location within Spain
- Coordinates: 42°14′0″N 1°28′48″E
- Country: Spain
- Community: Catalonia
- Province: Lleida
- Municipality: La Vansa i Fórnols
- Elevation: 991 m (3,251 ft)

Population
  - Total: 28

Sorribes de la Vansa is a locality located in the municipality of La Vansa i Fórnols, in Province of Lleida province, Catalonia, Spain. As of 2020, it has a population of 28.

== Geography ==
Sorribes de la Vansa is located 165km northeast of Lleida.
