= Adraén =

- Locality
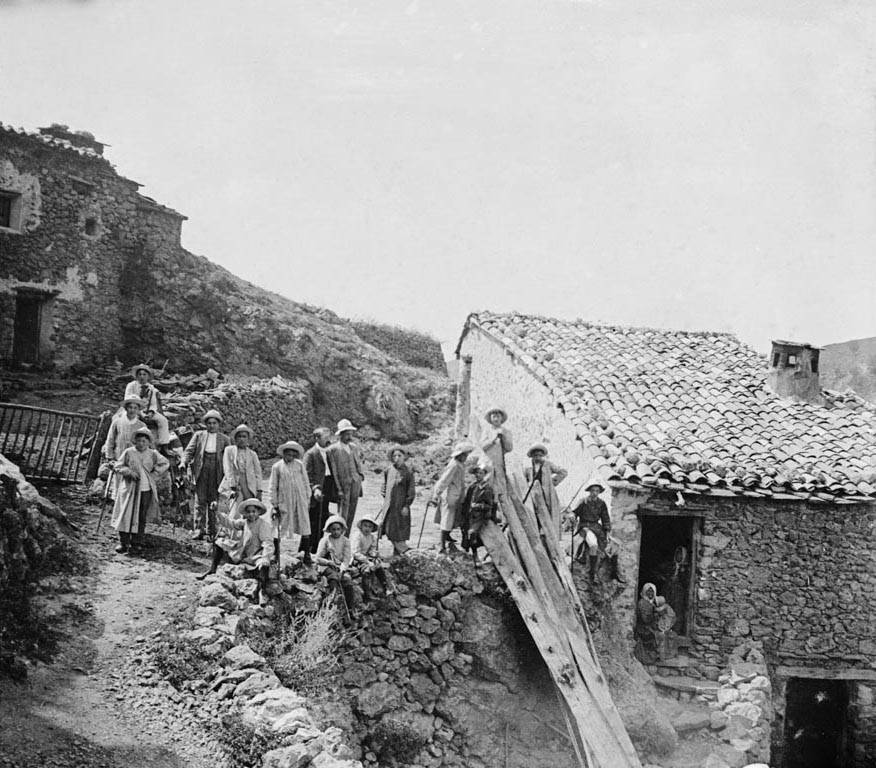

- Location within Province of Lleida Location within Catalonia Location within Spain
- Coordinates: 42°16′30″N 1°29′58″E
- Country: Spain
- Community: Catalonia
- Province: Lleida
- Municipality: La Vansa i Fórnols
- Elevation: 1,409 m (4,623 ft)

Population
  - Total: 21

Adraén is a locality located in the municipality of La Vansa i Fórnols, in Province of Lleida province, Catalonia, Spain. As of 2020, it has a population of 21.

== Geography ==
Adraén is located 157km northeast of Lleida.
