= Homilies d'Organyà =

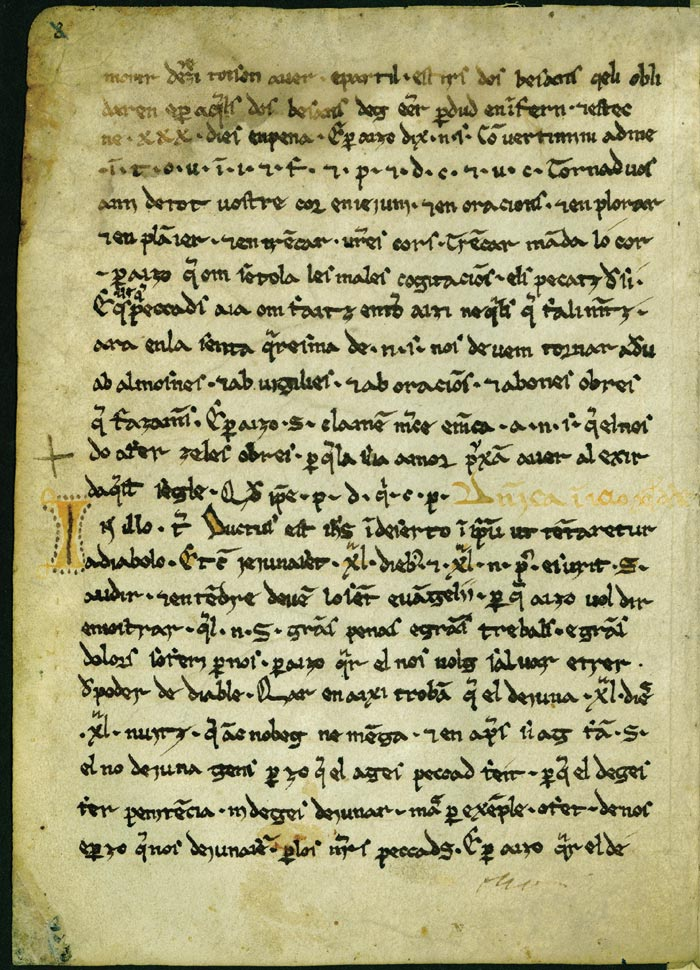
- Page of Homilies d'Organyà
- Author(s): Unknown
- Language: Catalan
- Date: end of the 12th century
- Provenance: Santa Maria d'Organyà, Organyà, Catalonia
- State of existence: Kept in National Library of Catalonia
- Genre: Religion
- Length: 8 leaves of paper; 23 lines each page, 50-55 words each line
- Subject: Six sermons on various gospels and epistles

The Homilies d'Organyà (Catalan pronunciation: [umiˈli.əz ðuɾɡəˈɲa]) constitute one of the oldest known literary documents (longer than a mere fragment) in the Catalan language. It is known for the antiquity of its language, between vulgar Latin and Catalan. Older texts in Catalan include a fragment of the Forum iudicum, the feudal oath of 1098, and the Greuges de Guitard Isarn of 1080–1091, also of Organyà origin, as well as Catalan glosses in Latin documents dated to as far back as 1034.

The Homilies d'Organyà were discovered in the vicarage of Organyà in 1904 by Dr. Joaquim Miret i Sans, a historian and lawyer. It is dated to the end of the 12th century and is composed of six sermons that include commentaries on various gospels and epistles.

The original is kept in the National Library of Catalonia, and a reproduction is also displayed in Organyà.

== Origin ==
The homilies discovered in Organyà are related to others that were found in Tortosa at the end of the 19th century by Antoine Thomas. Both have a common homily—that of Ash Wednesday—which has linked them to collections of homilies of Provençal origin, which were in frequent use in that era. While the Tortosa homilies copy the Provençal text and have a popular tone, those of Organyà are translations into Catalan and have a more cultivated tone.

== Level of linguistic development ==
The homilies are distinctive for the archaic level of development of the Catalan used in them, such as plader (to please, oblige), pad (peace), crod' (cross), fed ("make", imperative plural), etc., as well as the retention of the final s in the first person plural of verbs like soms ("we are", modern Catalan som) or vulams (subjunctive "we love" or "we like"; in modern Catalan, vulguem). Interference from Provençal is seen in orthographic, phonetic and morphological archaisms, owing to the close political, economic and cultural relations between the Occitan territories and the Catalan counties.

== See also ==
- Old Catalan
