= Miravé =

- Locality
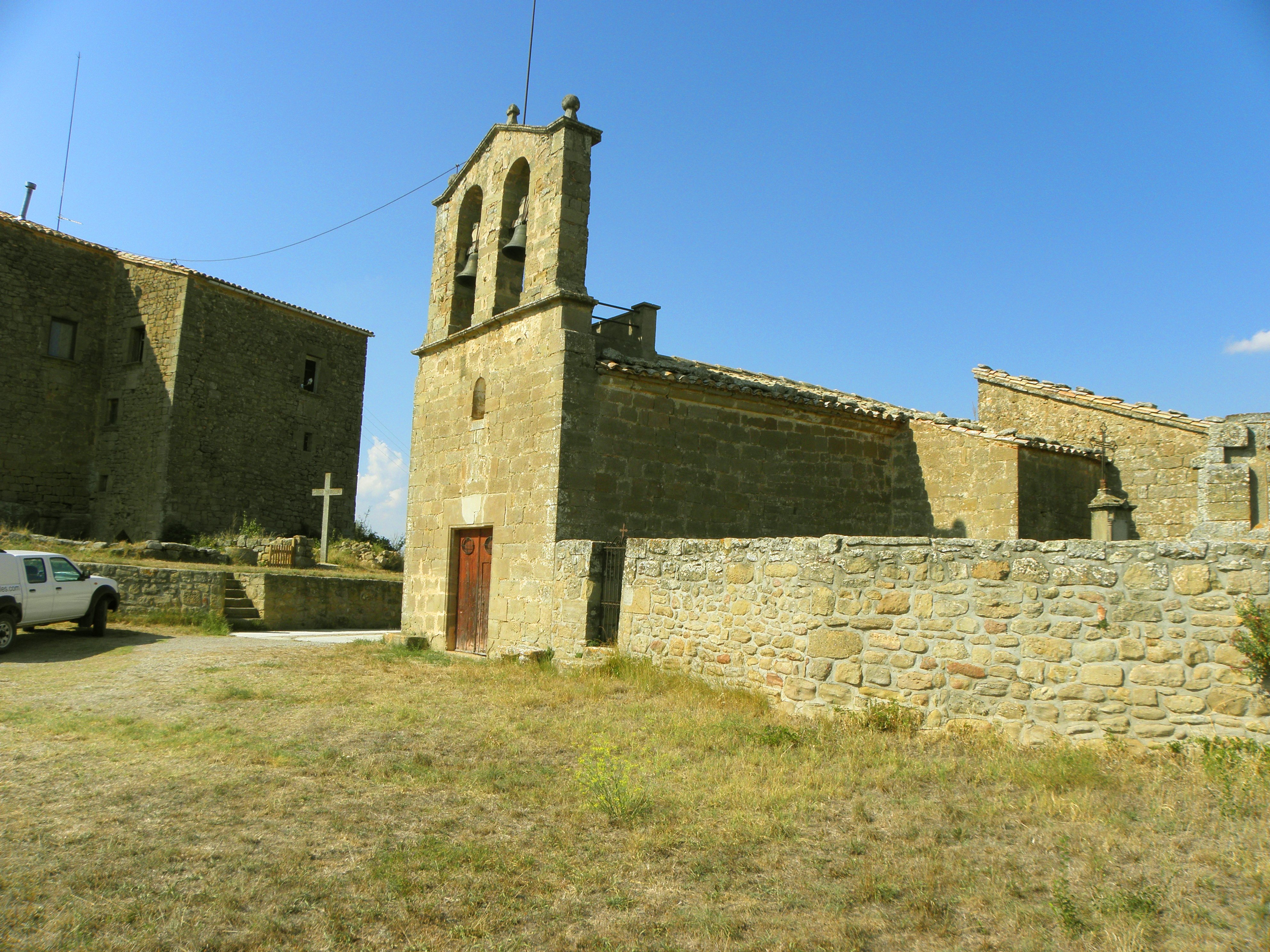

- Location within Province of Lleida Location within Catalonia Location within Spain
- Coordinates: 41°57′51″N 1°27′8″E
- Country: Spain
- Community: Catalonia
- Province: Lleida
- Municipality: Pinell de Solsonès
- Elevation: 851 m (2,792 ft)

Population
  - Total: 21

Miravé is a locality in the municipality of Pinell de Solsonès, in Province of Lleida province, Catalonia, Spain. As of 2020, it has a population of 21.

== Geography ==
Miravé is located 118 km (73 mi) east-northeast of Lleida.
