= Perles (Fígols i Alinyà) =

- Locality
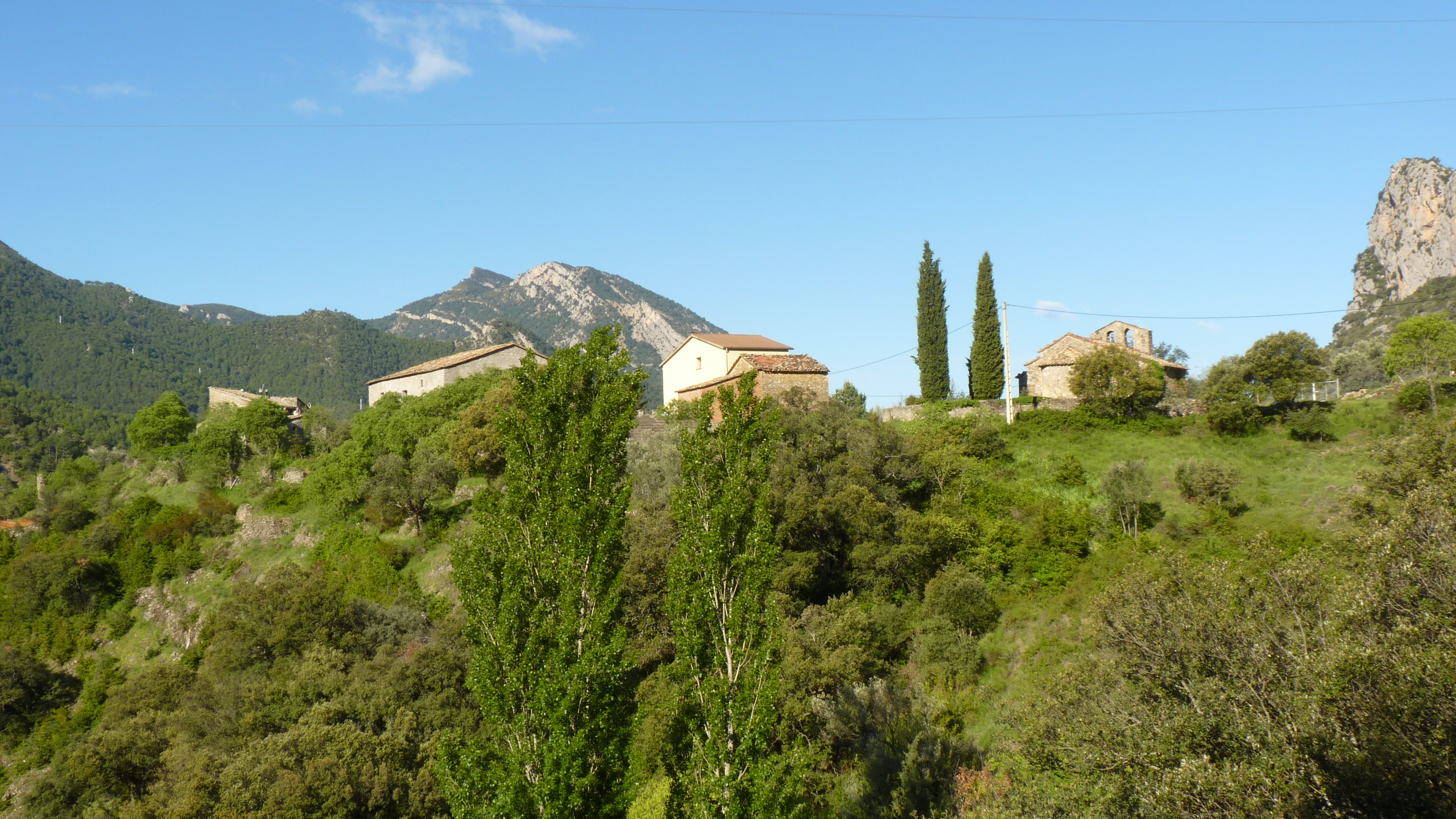

- Location within Province of Lleida Location within Catalonia Location within Spain
- Coordinates: 42°10′42″N 1°23′40″E
- Country: Spain
- Community: Catalonia
- Province: Lleida
- Municipality: Fígols i Alinyà
- Elevation: 793 m (2,602 ft)

Population
  - Total: 29

Perles is a locality located in the municipality of Fígols i Alinyà, in Province of Lleida province, Catalonia, Spain. As of 2020, it has a population of 29. Elevation is 793m (2,602 ft). Perles is located 119km northeast of Lleida.
