= El Vilar de Cabó =

- Locality
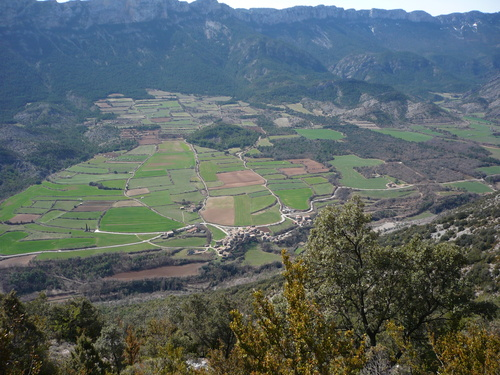

- Location within Province of Lleida Location within Catalonia Location within Spain
- Coordinates: 42°14′8″N 1°16′14″E
- Country: Spain
- Community: Catalonia
- Province: Lleida
- Municipality: Cabó
- Elevation: 703 m (2,306 ft)

Population
  - Total: 21

El Vilar de Cabó is a locality located in the municipality of Cabó, in Province of Lleida province, Catalonia, Spain. As of 2020, it has a population of 21.

== Geography ==
El Vilar de Cabó is located 122km northeast of Lleida.
