= Padrinàs =

- Locality
- Location within Province of Lleida Location within Catalonia Location within Spain
- Coordinates: 42°13′3″N 1°29′50″E
- Country: Spain
- Community: Catalonia
- Province: Lleida
- Municipality: La Vansa i Fórnols
- Elevation: 1,133 m (3,717 ft)

Population
  - Total: 7

Padrinàs is a locality located in the municipality of La Vansa i Fórnols, in Province of Lleida province, Catalonia, Spain. As of 2020, it has a population of 7.

== Geography ==
Padrinàs is located 167km northeast of Lleida.
