= La Barceloneta (La Vansa i Fórnols) =

- Locality
- Location within Province of Lleida Location within Catalonia Location within Spain
- Coordinates: 42°14′15″N 1°27′4″E
- Country: Spain
- Community: Catalonia
- Province: Lleida
- Municipality: La Vansa i Fórnols
- Elevation: 900 m (3,000 ft)

Population
  - Total: 7

La Barceloneta is a locality located in the municipality of La Vansa i Fórnols, in Province of Lleida province, Catalonia, Spain. As of 2020, it has a population of 7.

== Geography ==
La Barceloneta is located 146km northeast of Lleida.
