= Cornellana (La Vansa i Fórnols) =

- Locality
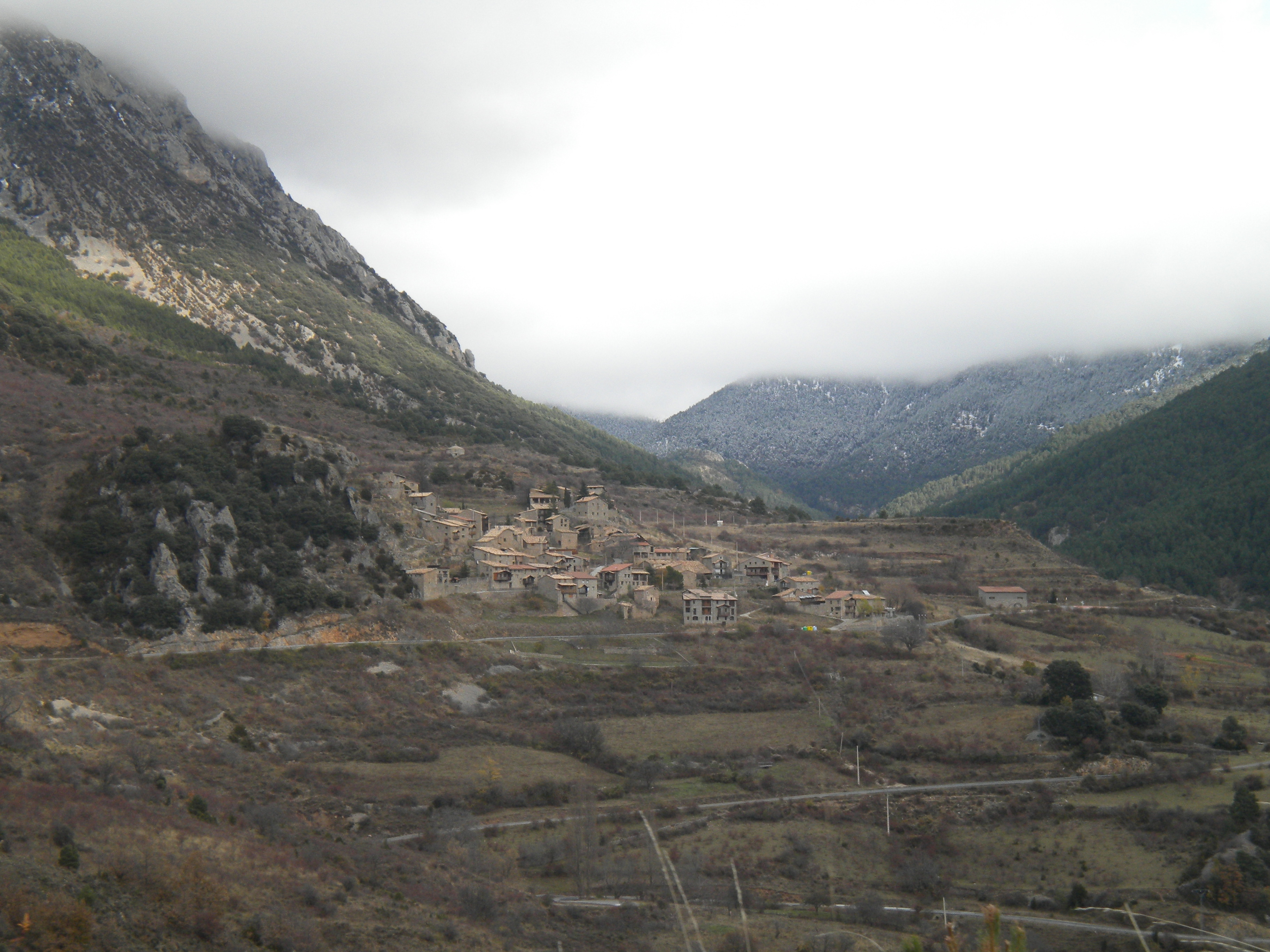

- Location within Province of Lleida Location within Catalonia Location within Spain
- Coordinates: 42°15′37″N 1°32′19″E
- Country: Spain
- Community: Catalonia
- Province: Lleida
- Municipality: La Vansa i Fórnols
- Elevation: 1,333 m (4,373 ft)

Population
  - Total: 25

Cornellana is a locality located in the municipality of La Vansa i Fórnols, in Province of Lleida province, Catalonia, Spain. As of 2020, it has a population of 25.

== Geography ==
Cornellana is located 165km northeast of Lleida.
