= Cava, Spain =

Cava
- Municipality
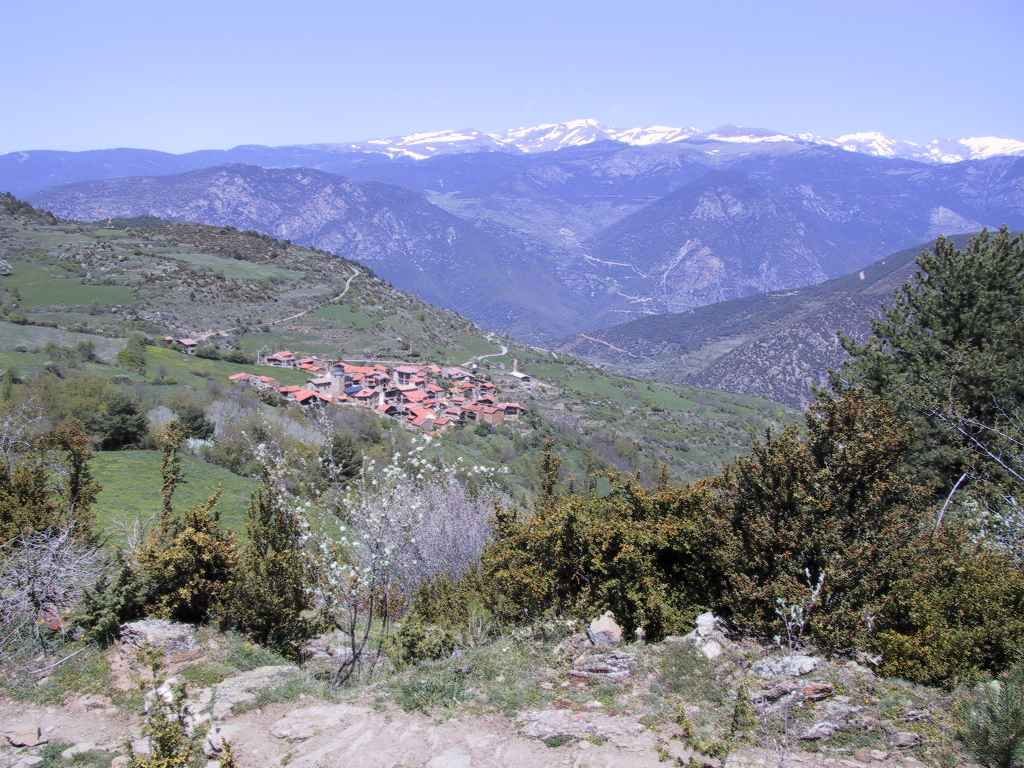
- Ansovell

- Coat of arms

- Location in Catalonia
- Coordinates: 42.327°N 1.586°E
- Country: Spain
- Community: Catalonia
- Province: Lleida
- Comarca: Alt Urgell

Government
  - Mayor: Alba Gonzalez Planas (2015)

Area
  - Total: 42.2 km^{2} (16.3 sq mi)

Population (2025-01-01)
  - Total: 38
  - Density: 0.90/km^{2} (2.3/sq mi)
- Website: cava.ddl.net

Cava (Catalan pronunciation: [ˈkaβə]) is a rural municipality in the comarca of Alt Urgell, Lleida, Catalonia, Spain. The population is scattered into three little villages (Cava, Ansovell and el Querforadat). In total it has a population of 38 (register office, 2025).
