= Sant Climenç =

- Locality
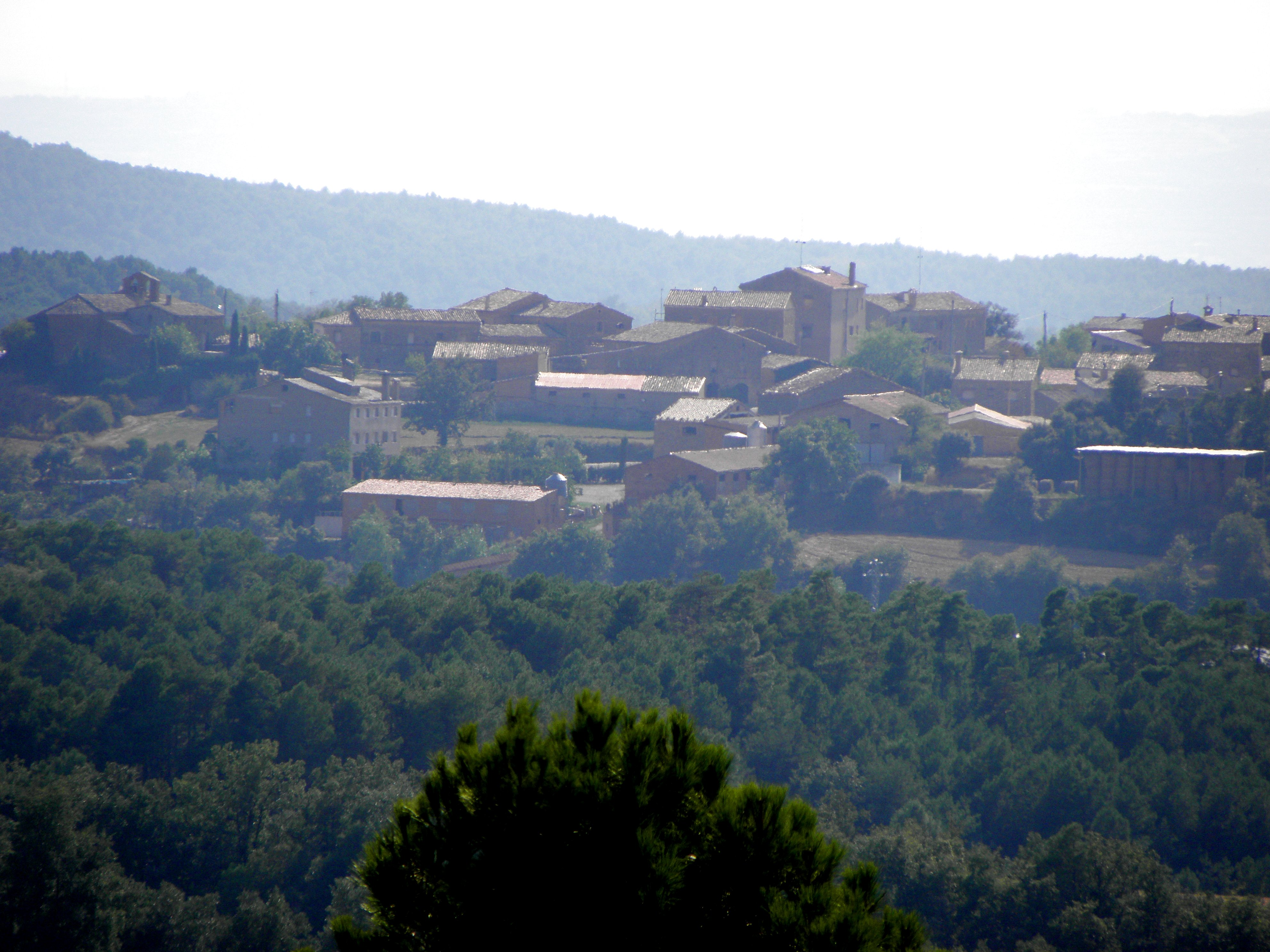

- Location within Province of Lleida Location within Catalonia Location within Spain
- Coordinates: 41°57′3″N 1°25′4″E
- Country: Spain
- Community: Catalonia
- Province: Lleida
- Municipality: Pinell de Solsonès
- Elevation: 804 m (2,638 ft)

Population
  - Total: 97

Sant Climenç is a locality located in the municipality of Pinell de Solsonès, in Province of Lleida province, Catalonia, Spain. As of 2020, it has a population of 97. Sant Climenç is the capital of the municipality of Pinell de Solsonès.

== Geography ==
Sant Climenç is located 102km east-northeast of Lleida.
