= Bassella =

- Municipality
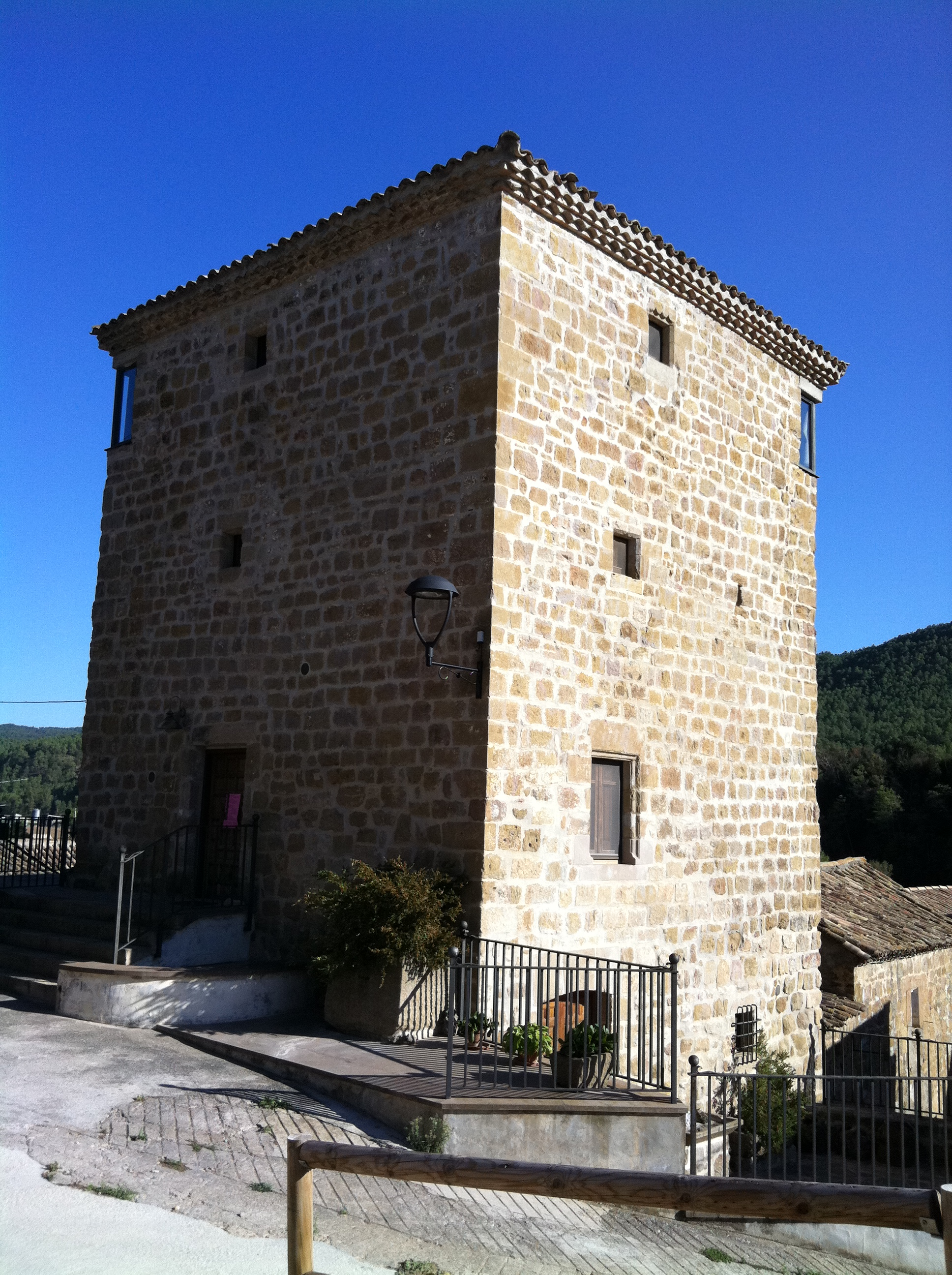
- Tower in Ogern (Bassella)

- Flag Coat of arms

- Location in Catalonia
- Coordinates: 42°0′25″N 1°17′44″E
- Country: Spain
- Community: Catalonia
- Province: Lleida
- Comarca: Alt Urgell

Government
  - Mayor: Cristina Barbens Casals (2015)

Area
  - Total: 70.2 km^{2} (27.1 sq mi)
- Elevation: 423 m (1,388 ft)

Population (2025-01-01)
  - Total: 216
  - Density: 3.08/km^{2} (7.97/sq mi)
- Demonym(s): Bassellenc, bassellenca
- Website: bassella.ddl.net

Bassella (Catalan pronunciation: [baˈseʎa]) is a municipality in the comarca of the Alt Urgell, in Catalonia, Spain. The village of Bassella, one of nine settlements which make up the municipality, is located at the confluence of the Segre river with the Salada river and at the point where the route from Solsona and the potash mines of Cardona (currently the L-301 road) meets the route between Lleida and La Seu d'Urgell (currently the C-1313 road). The ajuntament (town hall) is located in Castellnou de Bassella. In total it has a population of 216 (register office, 2025).

The municipality extends to both sides of the Segre river at the southern extremity of the Alt Urgell. Much of the territory has been flooded by the construction of the Rialb reservoir. It includes the southern exclave of Sant Mer within Pinell de Solsonès.

== Subdivisions ==
Populations are as of 2005

- Aguilar (21), with the foundations of the castle of Aguilar de Bassella
- Altès (41), with the church of Sant Pere (nineteenth century)
- Bassella (20), with the parish church of la Mare de Déu de l'Assumpció, also known as the Church of la Mare de Déu de la Garrola, and a wooden suspension bridge
- Castellnou de Bassella (7)
- La Clua (20), on a hill, with a Romanesque church dating from the twelfth century
- Guardiola (9), on the foothills of the Pubill range
- Mirambell (23)
- Ogern (123), on the road towards Solsona
- Serinyana (1)

== Demography ==
The quoted populations are for the entire municipality.

1900	1930	1950	1970	1986	2007
815	737	775	505	393	255
