= Fígols (Fígols i Alinyà) =

- Locality
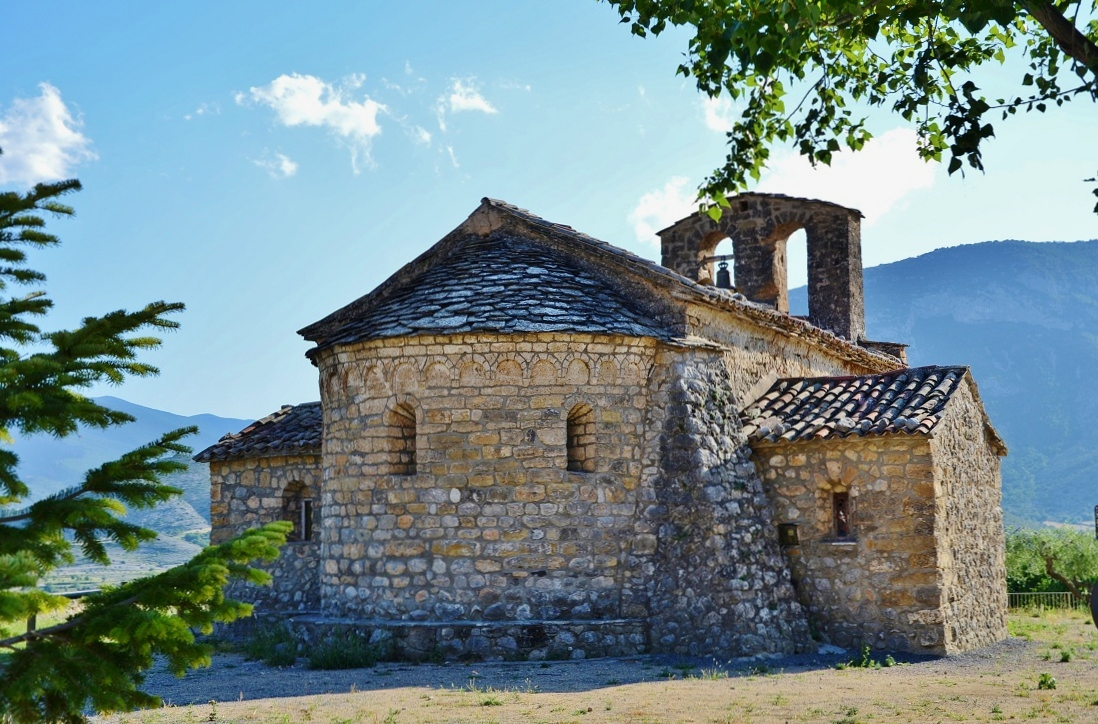

- Location within Province of Lleida Location within Catalonia Location within Spain
- Coordinates: 42°12′9″N 1°20′23″E
- Country: Spain
- Community: Catalonia
- Province: Lleida
- Municipality: Fígols i Alinyà
- Elevation: 609 m (1,998 ft)

Population
  - Total: 142

Fígols is a village located in the municipality of Fígols i Alinyà, in Province of Lleida province, Catalonia, Spain. As of 2020, it has a population of 142. Fígols is the capital of the municipality of Fígols i Alinyà.

== Geography ==
Fígols is located 114km northeast of Lleida.
