= Sant Pere (La Vansa i Fórnols) =

- Locality
- Location within Province of Lleida Location within Catalonia Location within Spain
- Coordinates: 42°13′42″N 1°29′48″E
- Country: Spain
- Community: Catalonia
- Province: Lleida
- Municipality: La Vansa i Fórnols
- Elevation: 1,036 m (3,399 ft)

Population
  - Total: 1

Sant Pere is a locality located in the municipality of La Vansa i Fórnols, in Province of Lleida province, Catalonia, Spain. As of 2020, it has a population of 1.

== Geography ==
Sant Pere is located 165km northeast of Lleida.
