= Ossera =

- Locality
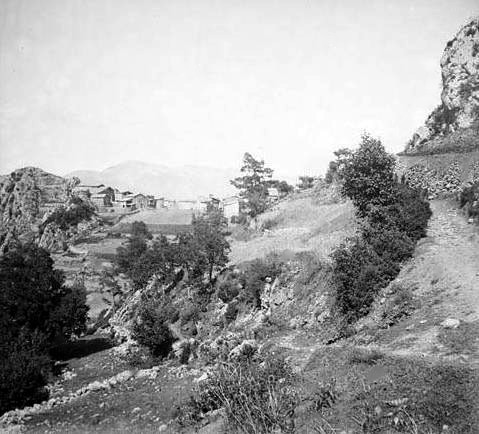

- Location within Province of Lleida Location within Catalonia Location within Spain
- Coordinates: 42°13′1″N 1°28′18″E
- Country: Spain
- Community: Catalonia
- Province: Lleida
- Municipality: La Vansa i Fórnols
- Elevation: 1,227 m (4,026 ft)

Population
  - Total: 23

Ossera is a locality located in the municipality of La Vansa i Fórnols, in Province of Lleida province, Catalonia, Spain. As of 2020, it has a population of 23.

== Geography ==
Ossera is located 171km northeast of Lleida.
