= El Pont de Bar =

- Municipality
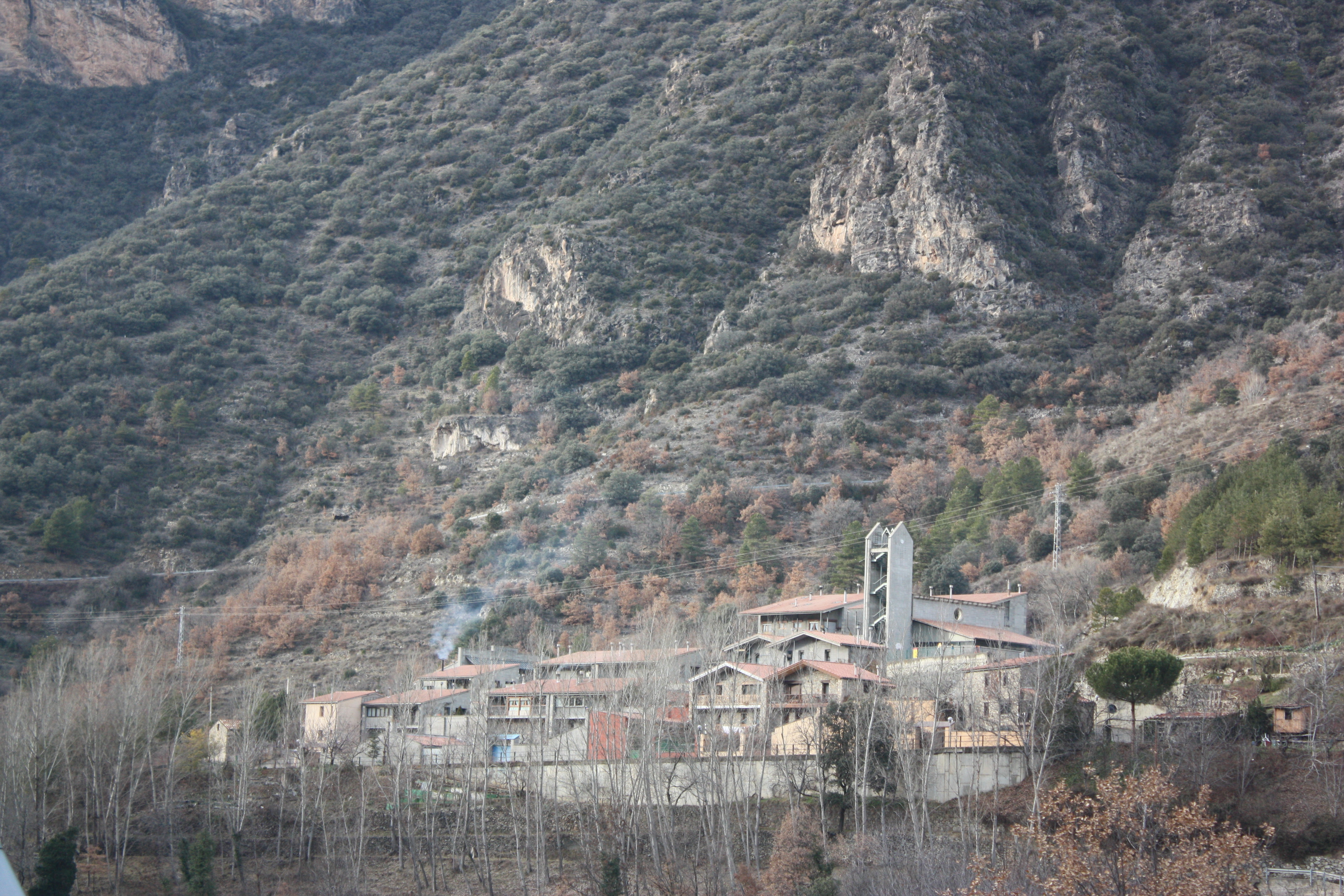

- Coat of arms

- Location in Catalonia
- Coordinates: 42.358°N 1.639°E
- Country: Spain
- Community: Catalonia
- Province: Lleida
- Comarca: Alt Urgell

Government
  - Mayor: Francisco Jordana Duran (2015)

Area
  - Total: 42.6 km^{2} (16.4 sq mi)

Population (2025-01-01)
  - Total: 162
  - Density: 3.80/km^{2} (9.85/sq mi)
- Website: pontbar.ddl.net

El Pont de Bar (Catalan pronunciation: [əl ˈpɔn də ˈβaɾ]) is a municipality in the comarca of the Alt Urgell in Catalonia, Spain. It has a population of 162 (register office, 2025).
