= Peramola =

- Municipality
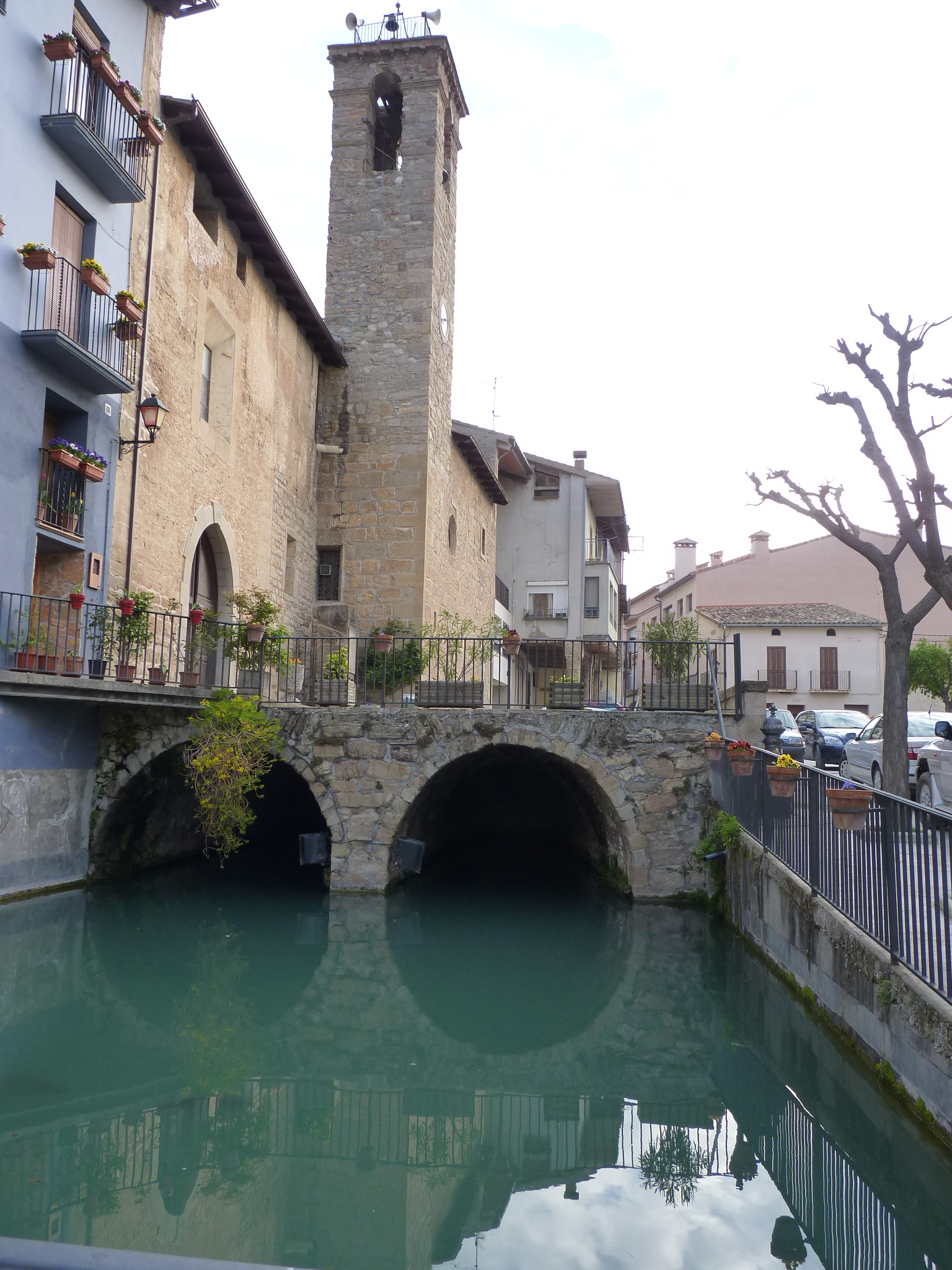

- Flag Coat of arms

- Location in Catalonia
- Coordinates: 42°3′N 1°16′E
- Country: Spain
- Community: Catalonia
- Province: Lleida
- Comarca: Alt Urgell

Government
  - Mayor: Gemma Orrit Capdevila (2015)

Area
  - Total: 56.2 km^{2} (21.7 sq mi)

Population (2025-01-01)
  - Total: 339
  - Density: 6.03/km^{2} (15.6/sq mi)
- Website: peramola.ddl.net

Peramola (Catalan pronunciation: [ˌpeɾaˈmɔla]) is a municipality in the comarca of the Alt Urgell in Catalonia, Spain. It has a population of 339 (register office, 2025).
