= La Vansa i Fórnols =

- Municipality
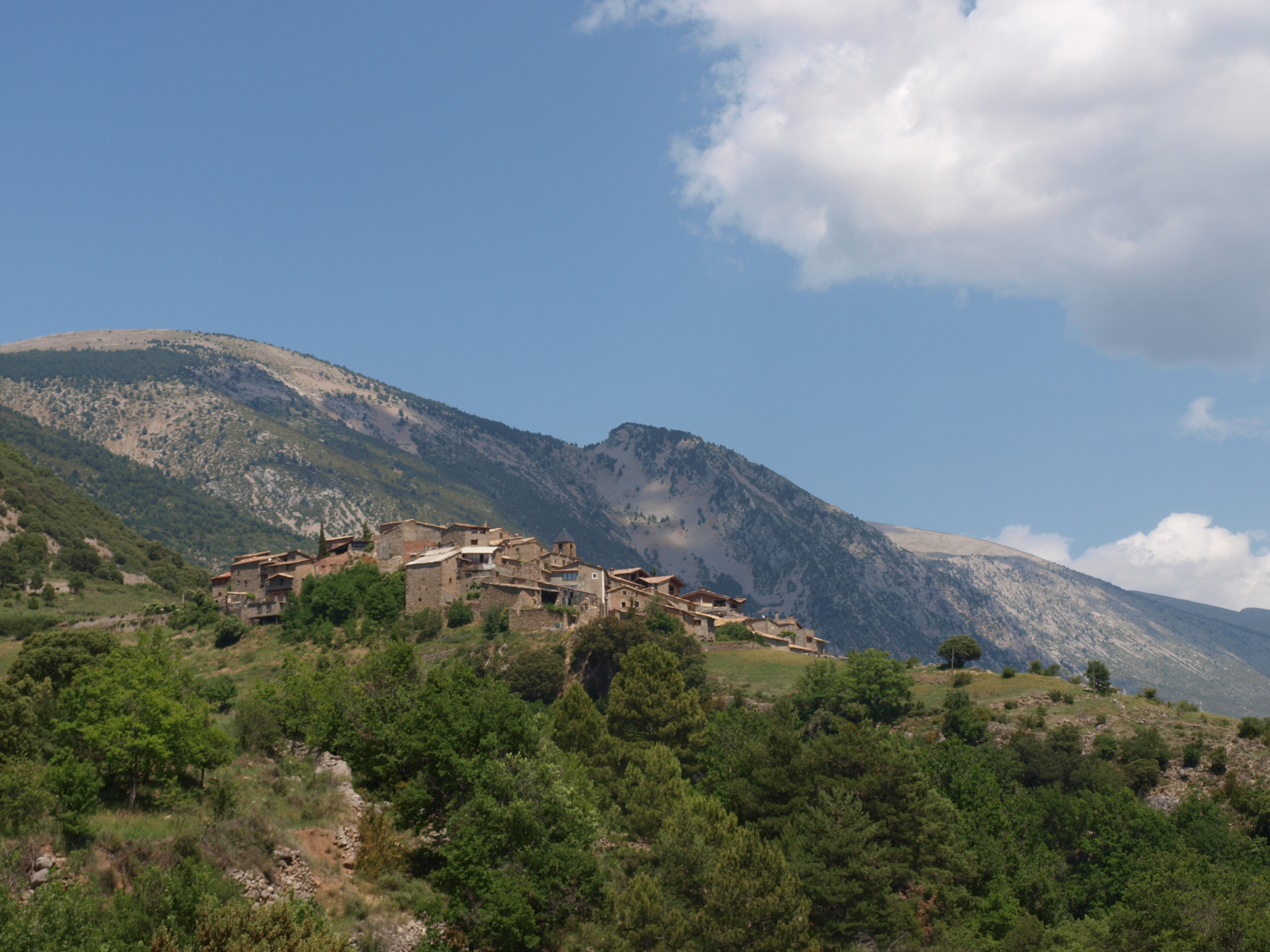
- Fórnols

- Coat of arms

- Location in Catalonia
- Coordinates: 42°14′7″N 1°29′0″E
- Country: Spain
- Community: Catalonia
- Province: Lleida
- Comarca: Alt Urgell

Government
  - Mayor: Josep Xavier Camps Torrens (2015)

Area
  - Total: 106.1 km^{2} (41.0 sq mi)

Population (2025-01-01)
  - Total: 187
  - Density: 1.76/km^{2} (4.56/sq mi)
- Website: vansafornols.ddl.net

La Vansa i Fórnols (Catalan pronunciation: [la ˈβansa j ˈfoɾnols]) is a municipality in the comarca of the Alt Urgell in Catalonia, Spain. It has a population of 187 (register office, 2025).

Villages:

- Adraén
- La Barceloneta
- Colldarnat
- Cornellana
- Fórnols de Cadí
- Montargull
- Ossera
- Padrinàs
- Sant Pere
- Sisquer
- Sorribes de la Vansa
