= Ribera d'Urgellet =

- Municipality
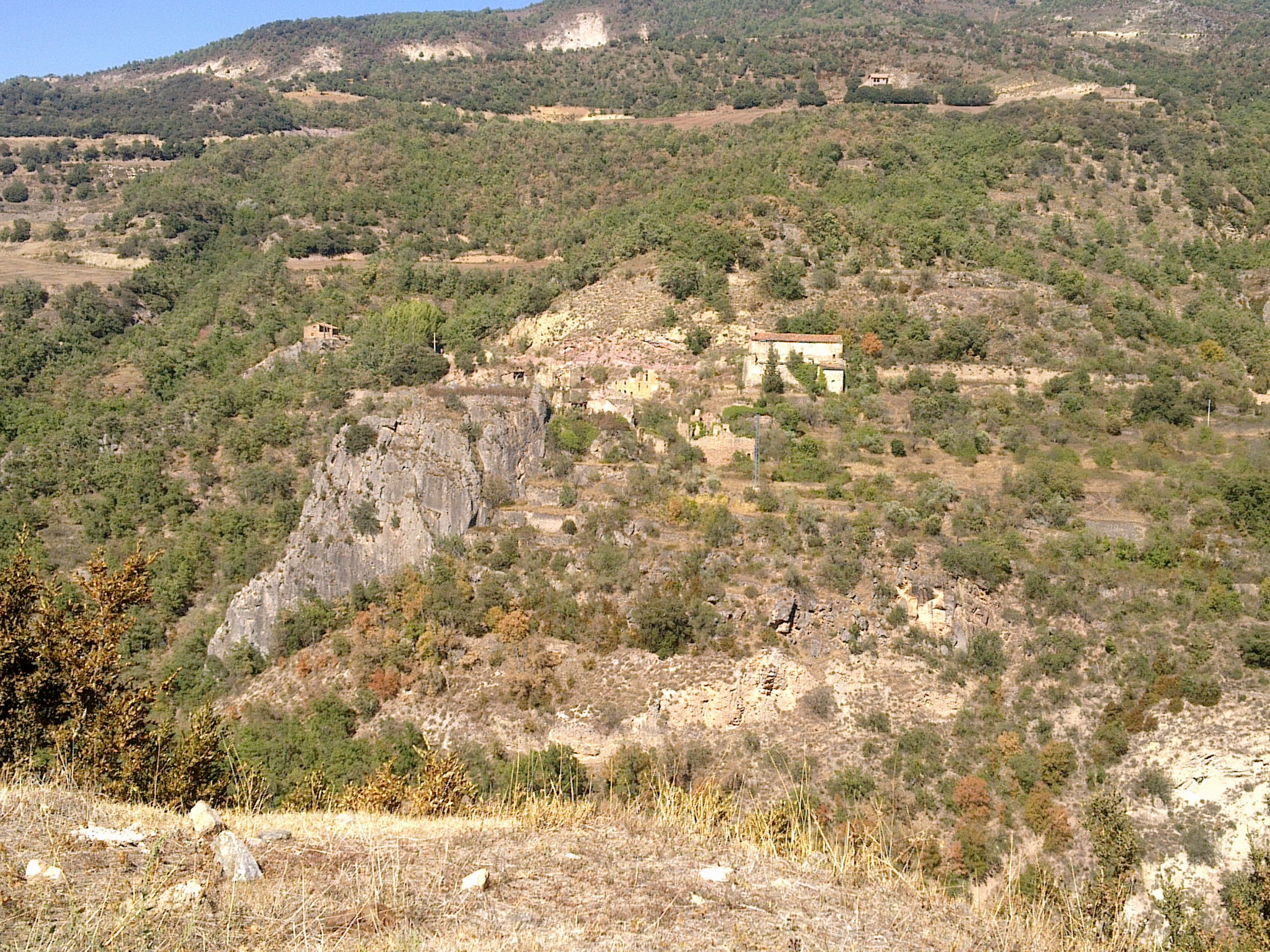
- Tost castle

- Flag Coat of arms

- Location in Catalonia
- Coordinates: 42.312°N 1.383°E
- Country: Spain
- Community: Catalonia
- Province: Lleida
- Comarca: Alt Urgell

Government
  - Mayor: Josefina Lladós Torrent (2015) (ERC)

Area
  - Total: 107.0 km^{2} (41.3 sq mi)

Population (2025-01-01)
  - Total: 989
  - Density: 9.24/km^{2} (23.9/sq mi)
- Website: riberaurgellet.cat

Ribera d'Urgellet (Catalan pronunciation: [riˈβeɾa ðuɾdʒeˈʎet]) is a municipality in the comarca of the Alt Urgell in Catalonia, Spain. It includes a small exclave to the west. It has a population of 989 (register office, 2025).
