= Alt Urgell =

Coordinates: 42°14′19″N 1°24′22″E

- Comarca
- Coat of arms

- Country: Spain
- Autonomous community: Catalonia
- Province: Lleida
- Region: Alt Pirineu
- Capital: La Seu d'Urgell
- Municipalities: List: Alàs i Cerc, Arsèguel, Bassella, Cabó, Cava, Coll de Nargó, Estamariu, Fígols i Alinyà, Josa i Tuixén, Montferrer i Castellbò, Oliana, Organyà, Peramola, El Pont de Bar, Ribera d'Urgellet, La Seu d'Urgell, Les Valls d'Aguilar, Les Valls de Valira, La Vansa i Fórnols

Government
  - Body: Alt Urgell Comarcal Council
  - President: Josefina Lladós (Junts)

Area
  - Total: 1,447.5 km^{2} (558.9 sq mi)

Population (2014)
  - Total: 20,878
  - Density: 14.423/km^{2} (37.357/sq mi)
- Demonym(s): alturgellenc, alturgellenca
- Time zone: UTC+1 (CET)
  - Summer (DST): UTC+2 (CEST)
- Largest municipality: La Seu d'Urgell
- Website: www.alturgell.cat

Alt Urgell (Catalan pronunciation: [ˈalt uɾˈdʒeʎ]) is a comarca (county) in the Alt Pirineu region, in Catalonia, Spain. It is part of the historic County of Urgell (ca. 789 – 1413) and the historic region of Urgellet. The capital is La Seu d'Urgell.

== Municipalities ==
| Municipality | Population (2014) | Area km^{2} |
|---|---|---|
| Alàs i Cerc | 356 | 57.7 |
| Arsèguel | 81 | 10.6 |
| Bassella | 244 | 70.2 |
| Cabó | 98 | 80.3 |
| Cava | 60 | 42.2 |
| Coll de Nargó | 587 | 151.4 |
| Estamariu | 119 | 21.2 |
| Fígols i Alinyà | 260 | 101.8 |
| Josa i Tuixén | 128 | 68.2 |
| Montferrer i Castellbò | 1,027 | 176.7 |
| Oliana | 1,870 | 32.4 |
| Organyà | 841 | 12.5 |
| Peramola | 349 | 56.2 |
| El Pont de Bar | 172 | 42.6 |
| Ribera d'Urgellet | 963 | 107.0 |
| La Seu d'Urgell | 12,366 | 15.4 |
| Les Valls d'Aguilar | 298 | 123.8 |
| Les Valls de Valira | 849 | 171.2 |
| La Vansa i Fórnols | 210 | 106.1 |
| • Total: 19 | 20,878 | 1,447.5 |
