= Pinell de Solsonès =

- Municipality
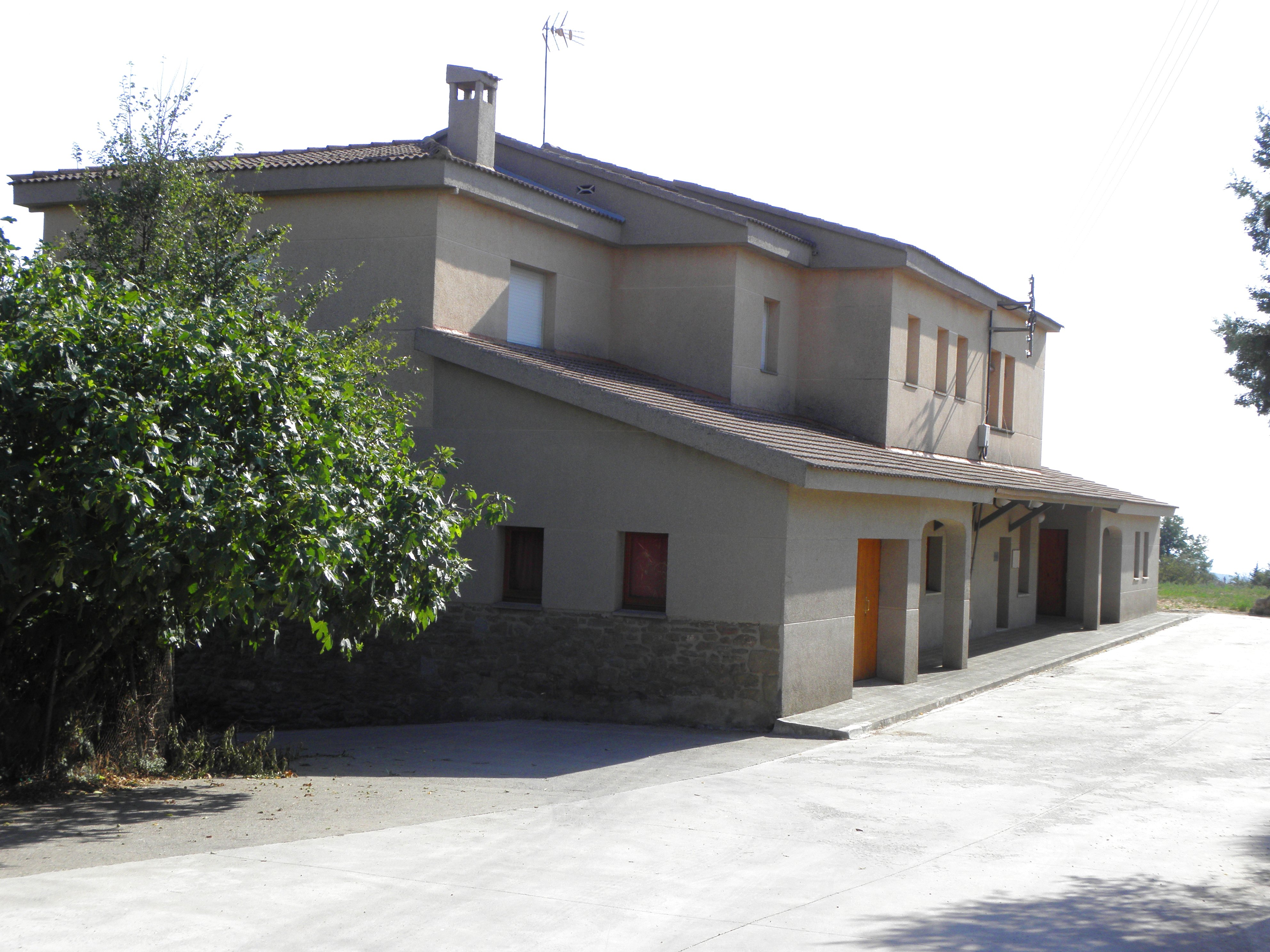
- Town hall, Sant Climenç

- Flag Coat of arms

- Location in Catalonia
- Coordinates: 41°57′7″N 1°25′11″E
- Country: Spain
- Community: Catalonia
- Province: Lleida
- Comarca: Solsonès

Government
  - Mayor: Benjamí Puig Riu (2015)

Area
  - Total: 91.1 km^{2} (35.2 sq mi)

Population (2025-01-01)
  - Total: 198
  - Density: 2.17/km^{2} (5.63/sq mi)
- Website: www.pinelldesolsones.cat

Pinell de Solsonès (Catalan pronunciation: [piˈneʎ ðe solsoˈnɛs]) is a municipality in the province of Lleida and autonomous community of Catalonia, Spain.

The villages of Madrona, Miravé, Pinell, Sallent, and Sant Climenç are located in this municipality. It total it has a population of 198 (register office, 2025).
