= Organyà =

- Municipality
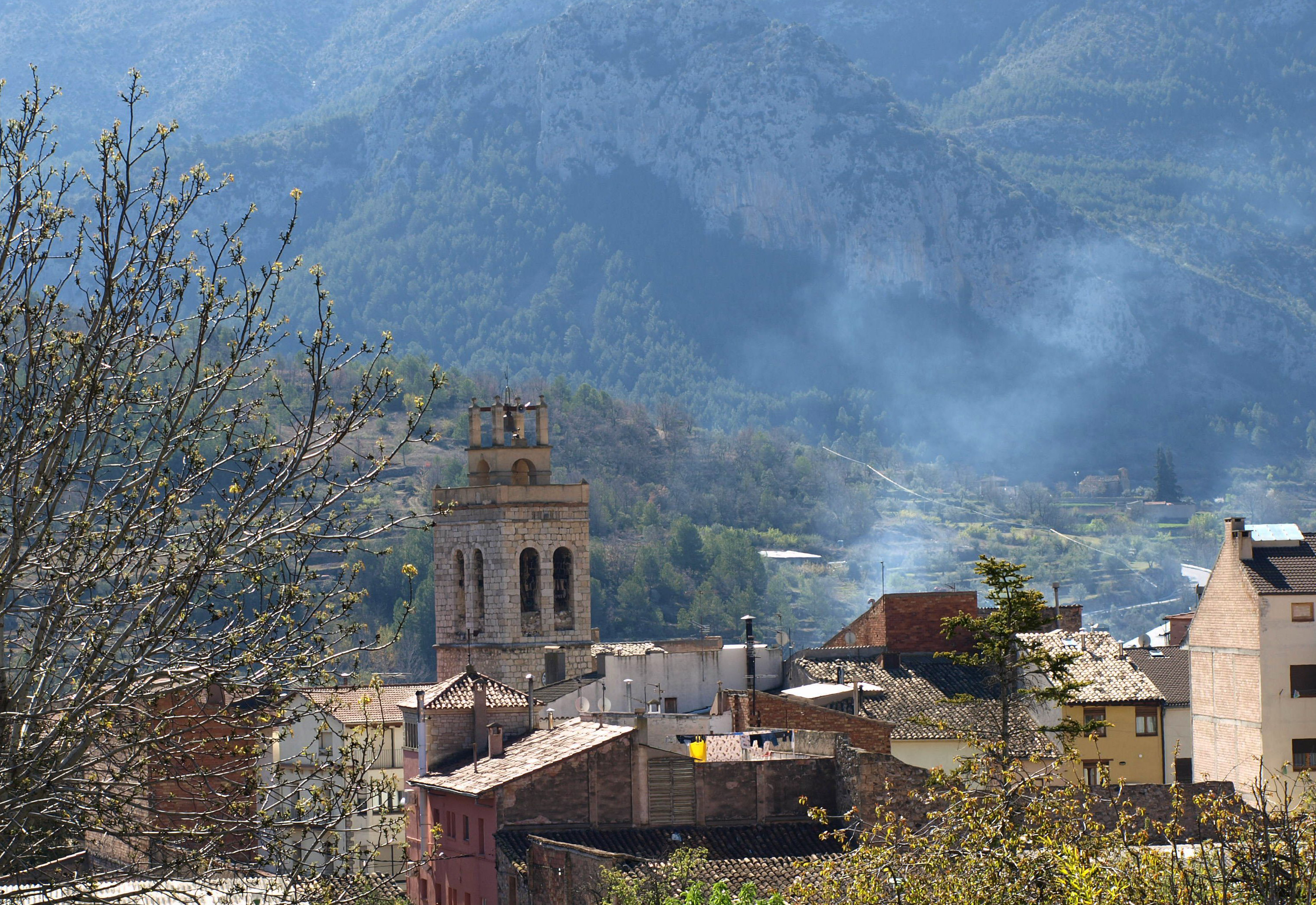
- Organyà

- Flag Coat of arms

- Location in Catalonia Organyà (Catalonia) Organyà (Spain)
- Coordinates: 42°12′47″N 1°19′44″E
- Country: Spain
- Community: Catalonia
- Province: Lleida
- Comarca: Alt Urgell

Government
  - Mayor: Cel·lestí Vilà Betriu (2015)

Area
  - Total: 12.5 km^{2} (4.8 sq mi)
- Elevation: 558 m (1,831 ft)

Population (2025-01-01)
  - Total: 853
  - Density: 68.2/km^{2} (177/sq mi)
- Demonym(s): Ganxo, Ganxa; Organyès, organyesa Organyenc, organyenca
- Website: organya.cat

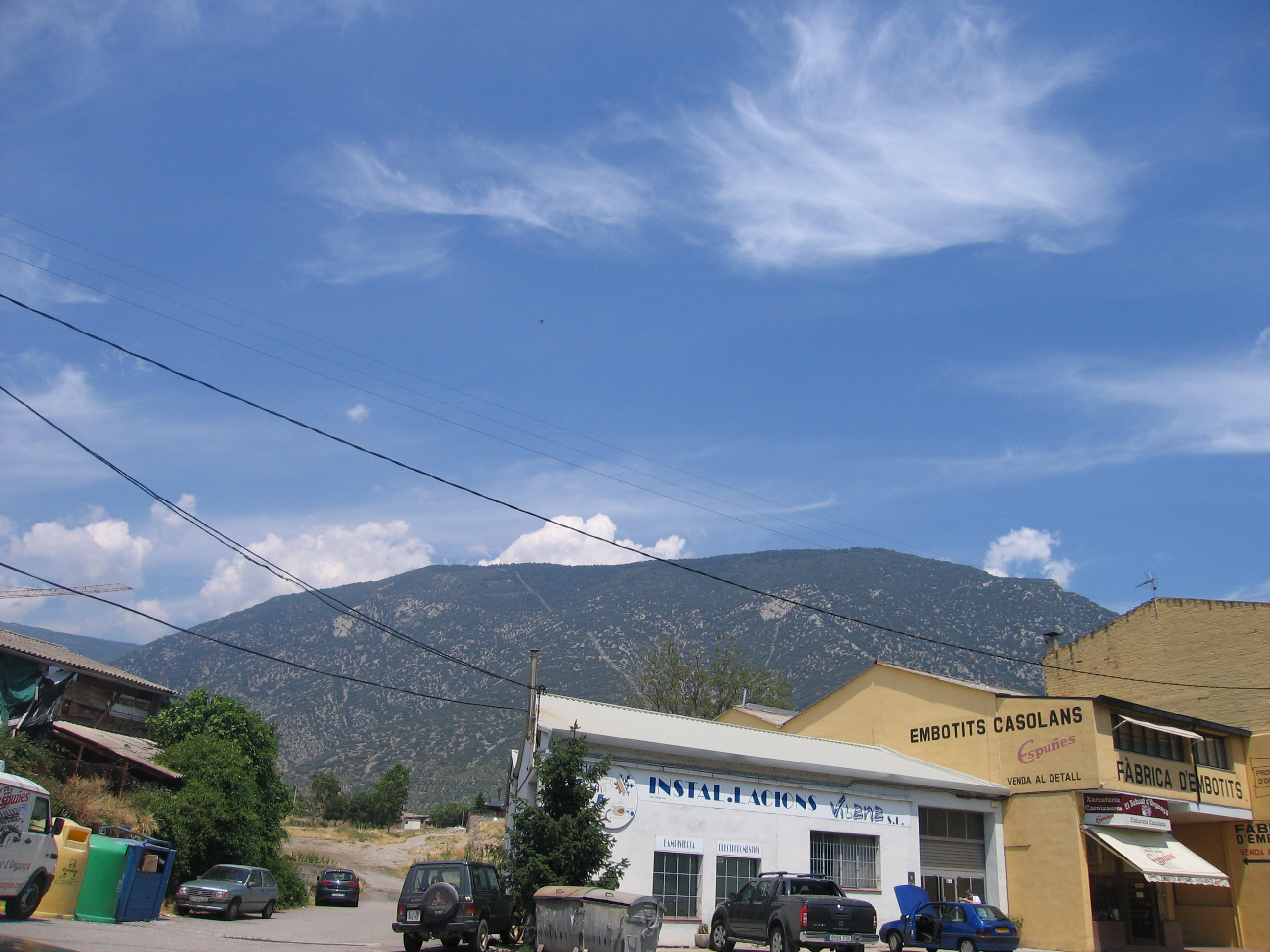
Organya, July 2007.

Organyà (Catalan pronunciation: [oɾɣaˈɲa]) is a municipality in the comarca of the Alt Urgell, Province of Lleida, Catalonia, Spain. It is situated on the right bank of the Segre river below the Trespons gorge, and is served by the C-14 road between Ponts and La Seu d'Urgell. There is a monument to the Homilies d'Organyà, a 12th or 13th century collection of sermons which is the oldest literary text in the Catalan language to survive in its entirety, discovered in the town in 1904. It has a population of 853 (register office, 2025).

Organyà is the birthplace of Rosa Florentina Eroles (1815-1864), the mother of Francis Ysidro Edgeworth.

The municipality surrounds an exclave of Cabó.

== Demography ==
1900	1930	1950	1970	1986	2007
1002	1036	1087	1142	1079	959
