= El Querforadat =

- Locality
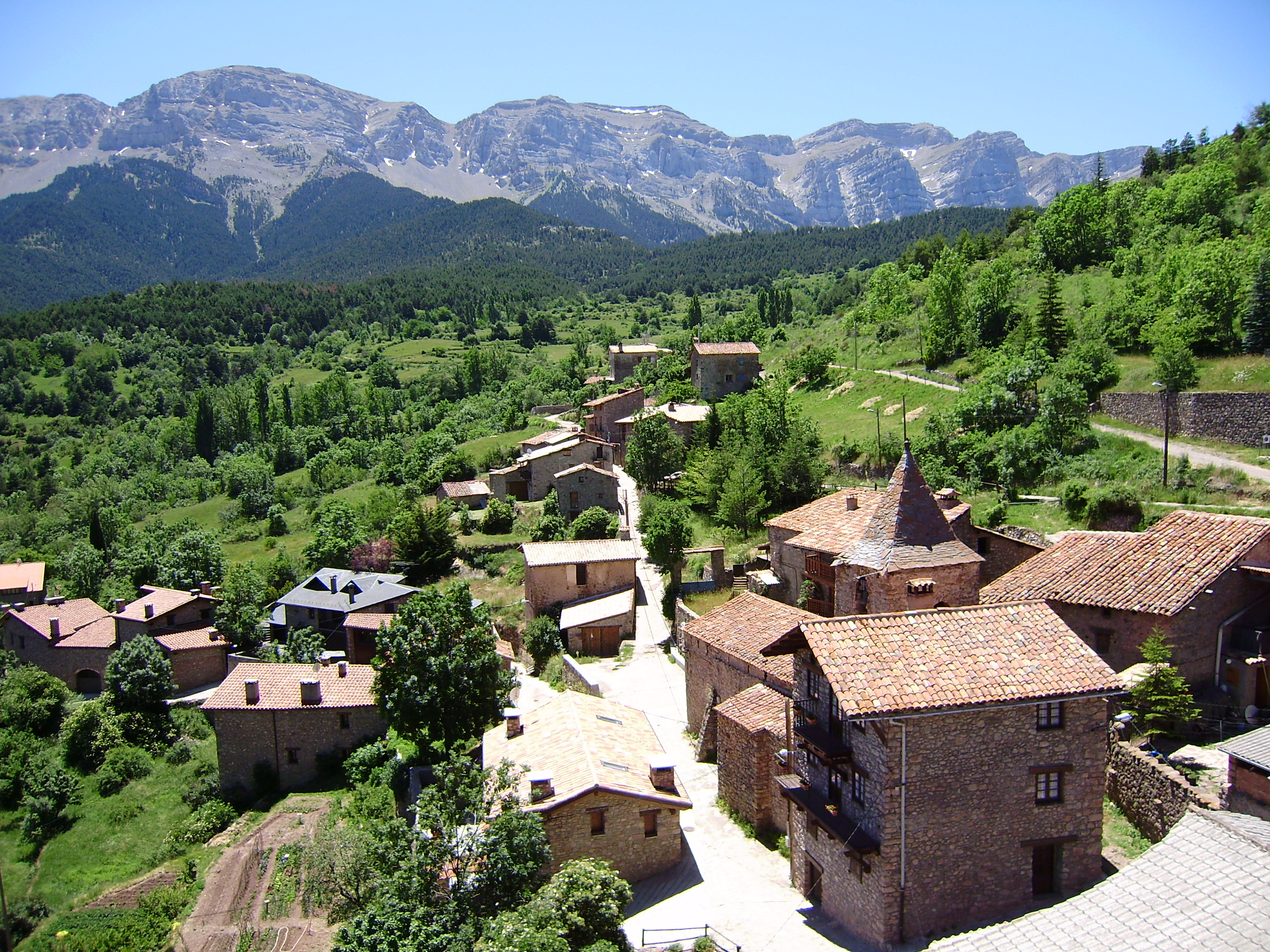

- Location within Province of Lleida Location within Catalonia Location within Spain
- Coordinates: 42°19′22″N 1°38′9″E
- Country: Spain
- Community: Catalonia
- Province: Lleida
- Municipality: Cava, Lleida
- Elevation: 1,382 m (4,534 ft)

Population
  - Total: 14

El Querforadat is a locality located in the municipality of Cava, Lleida, in the Province of Lleida, Catalonia, Spain. As of 2020, it has a population of 14.

== Geography ==
El Querforadat is located 163km northeast of Lleida.
