= Estamariu =

- Municipality
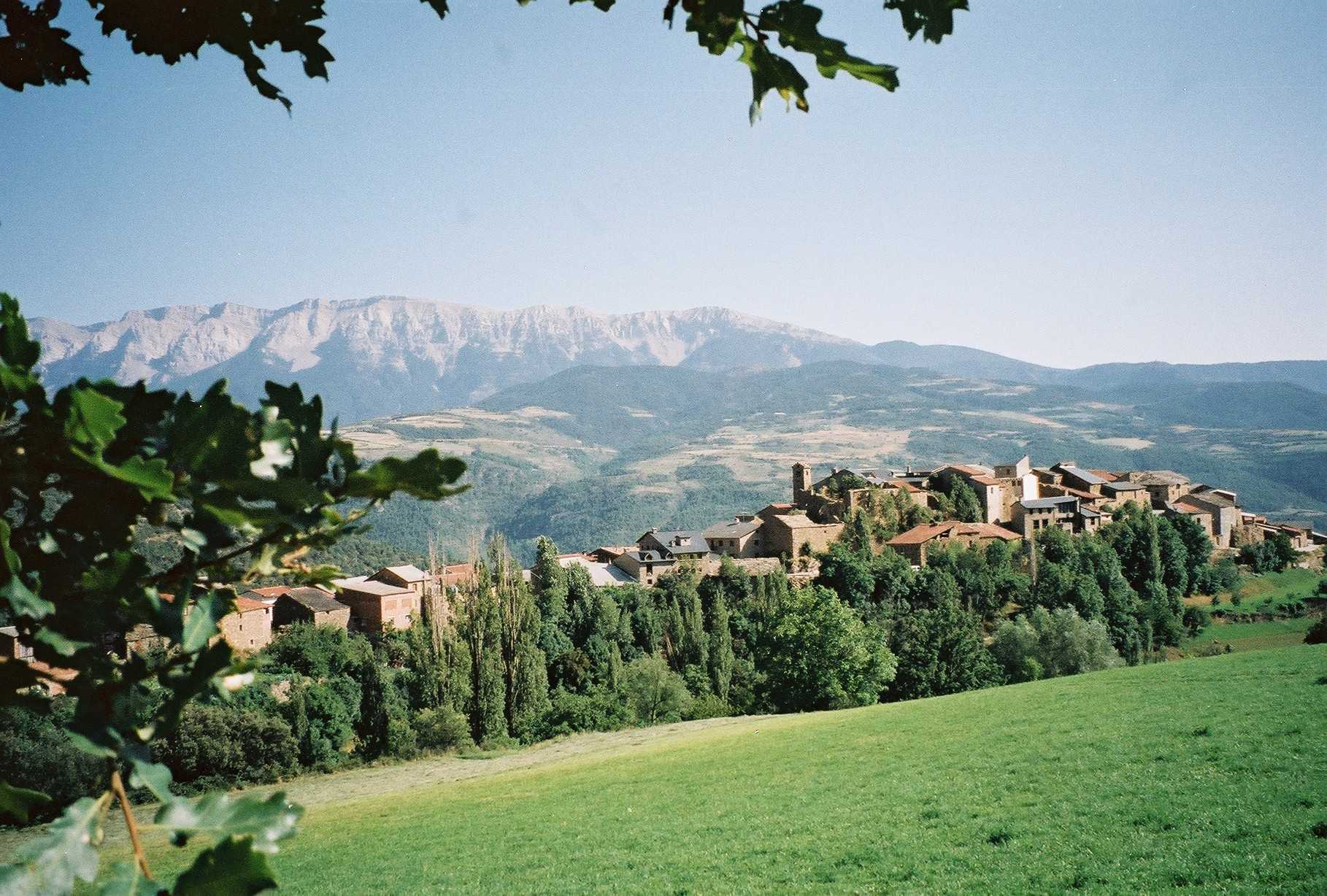

- Flag Coat of arms

- Location in Catalonia
- Coordinates: 42.375°N 1.524°E
- Country: Spain
- Community: Catalonia
- Province: Lleida
- Comarca: Alt Urgell

Government
  - Mayor: Pere Navinés Planes (2015)

Area
  - Total: 21.2 km^{2} (8.2 sq mi)

Population (2025-01-01)
  - Total: 135
  - Density: 6.37/km^{2} (16.5/sq mi)
- Website: estamariu.ddl.net

Estamariu (Catalan pronunciation: [əstəməˈɾiw]) is a municipality in the comarca of Alt Urgell, Lleida, Catalonia, Spain. It has a population of 135 (register office, 2025).
