= Les Valls d'Aguilar =

- Municipality
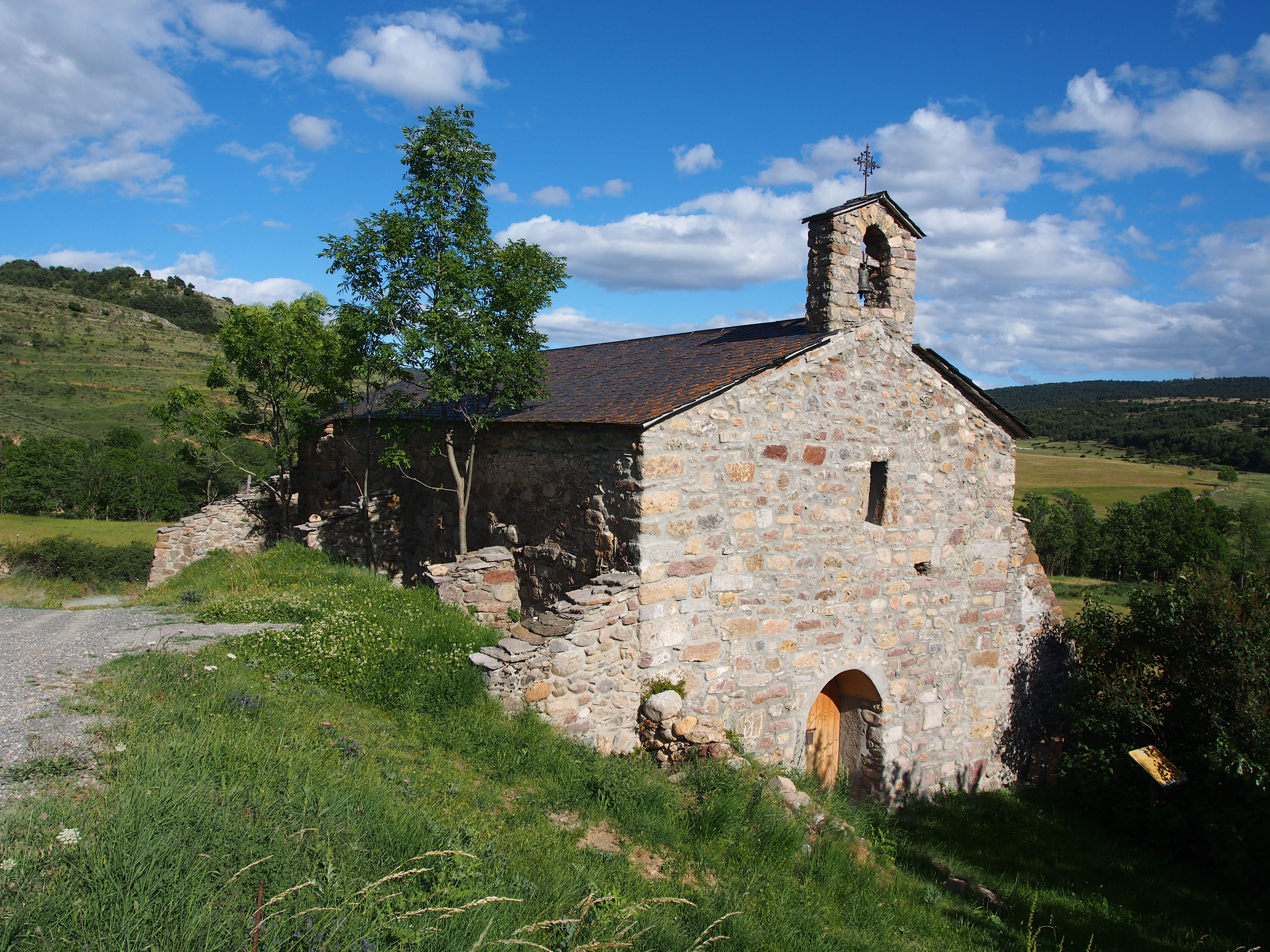
- Sant Martí de Taús

- Flag Coat of arms

- Location in Catalonia
- Coordinates: 42°17′45″N 1°20′35″E
- Country: Spain
- Community: Catalonia
- Province: Lleida
- Comarca: Alt Urgell

Government
  - Mayor: Rosa Ma. Fàbrega Romà (2015)

Area
  - Total: 123.8 km^{2} (47.8 sq mi)

Population (2025-01-01)
  - Total: 253
  - Density: 2.04/km^{2} (5.29/sq mi)
- Website: vallsaguilar.ddl.net

Les Valls d'Aguilar (Catalan pronunciation: [lez ˈbaʎz daɣiˈla]) is a municipality in the Catalan region of Alt Urgell, Catalonia, Spain. As of 2013, it had a population of 320 inhabitants. The municipality includes the localities of Argestues, Bellpui, Berén, Biscarbó, Castellás, Castells, Espaén, Guardia de Arés, Junyent, Miravall, Novés de Segre, Tahus, and Trejuvell. It has a population of 253 (register office, 2025).

== History ==
It was part of the viscounty of Castellbó. The current municipality was formed in 1972 by the merger of the former municipalities of Castellás (Castellàs del Cantó), Guardia de Arés (Guardia d'Arés), Noves de Segre, and Tahús (Taús) (see "List of Disappeared Municipalities since the Beginning of the Century" published by the National Institute of Statistics, 1981). The capital of the municipality is Noves de Segre.

== Culture ==
The parish church of Novés de Segre is dedicated to Saint Servi. It is a Romanesque church with a central nave and a side nave. It has an attached tower belfry. In Bellpui, the ruins of another Romanesque church, the Church of Santa Leocadia, can be found.

The parish church of Guardia de Arés is dedicated to Saint Stephen and is also Romanesque, dating back to the 12th century. It has a single nave with a barrel vault roof and two later-added side chapels. It features a semicircular apse and a bell gable. The Church of Santa Elena in Trejuvell has pre-Romanesque origins and a trapezoidal apse.

In Tahus, the Church of Santa Julia is located. It is of Romanesque origin, with a single nave and a rectangular plan. The roof is vaulted with reinforced arches. It has a semicircular apse, and the old entrance, now blocked, is arched. The current entrance dates back to 1769.

== Economy ==
The main economic activity is livestock farming, with very few areas dedicated to agriculture. Cattle farming, especially for milk production, and sheep farming are prominent.

Located in Catalonia, Spain, Les Valls d'Aguilar offers a wide range of attractions and experiences, making it a destination worth visiting.
