= Arsèguel =

- Municipality
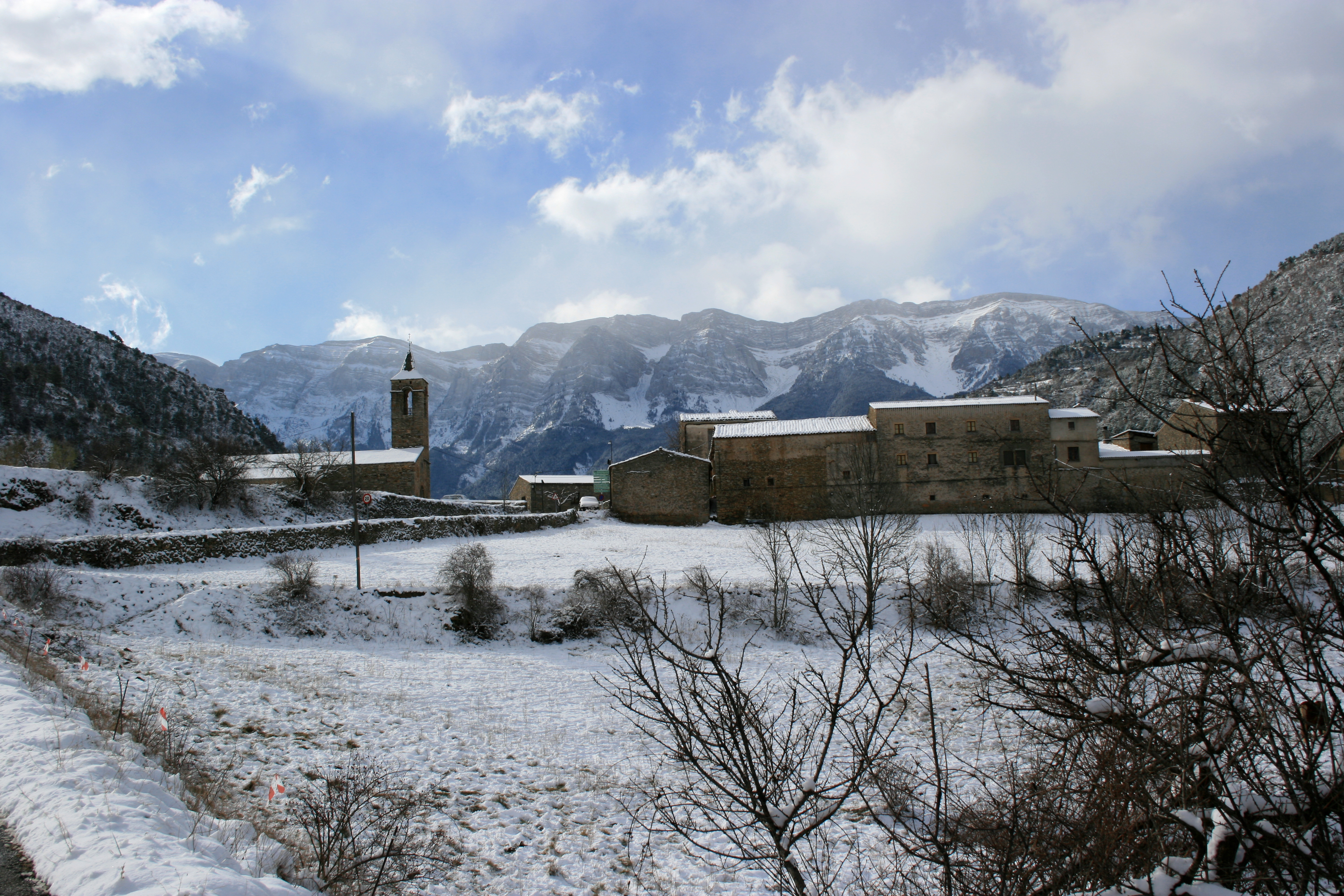

- Flag Coat of arms

- Location in Catalonia
- Coordinates: 42.352°N 1.584°E
- Country: Spain
- Community: Catalonia
- Province: Lleida
- Comarca: Alt Urgell

Government
  - Mayor: Antoni Casanovas Alis (2015)

Area
  - Total: 10.6 km^{2} (4.1 sq mi)

Population (2025-01-01)
  - Total: 87
  - Density: 8.2/km^{2} (21/sq mi)
- Website: arseguel.ddl.net

Arsèguel (Catalan pronunciation: [əɾˈsɛɣəl]) is a municipality in the comarca of Alt Urgell, Lleida, Catalonia, Spain. It has a population of 87 (register office, 2025).
