= Alàs i Cerc =

- Municipality
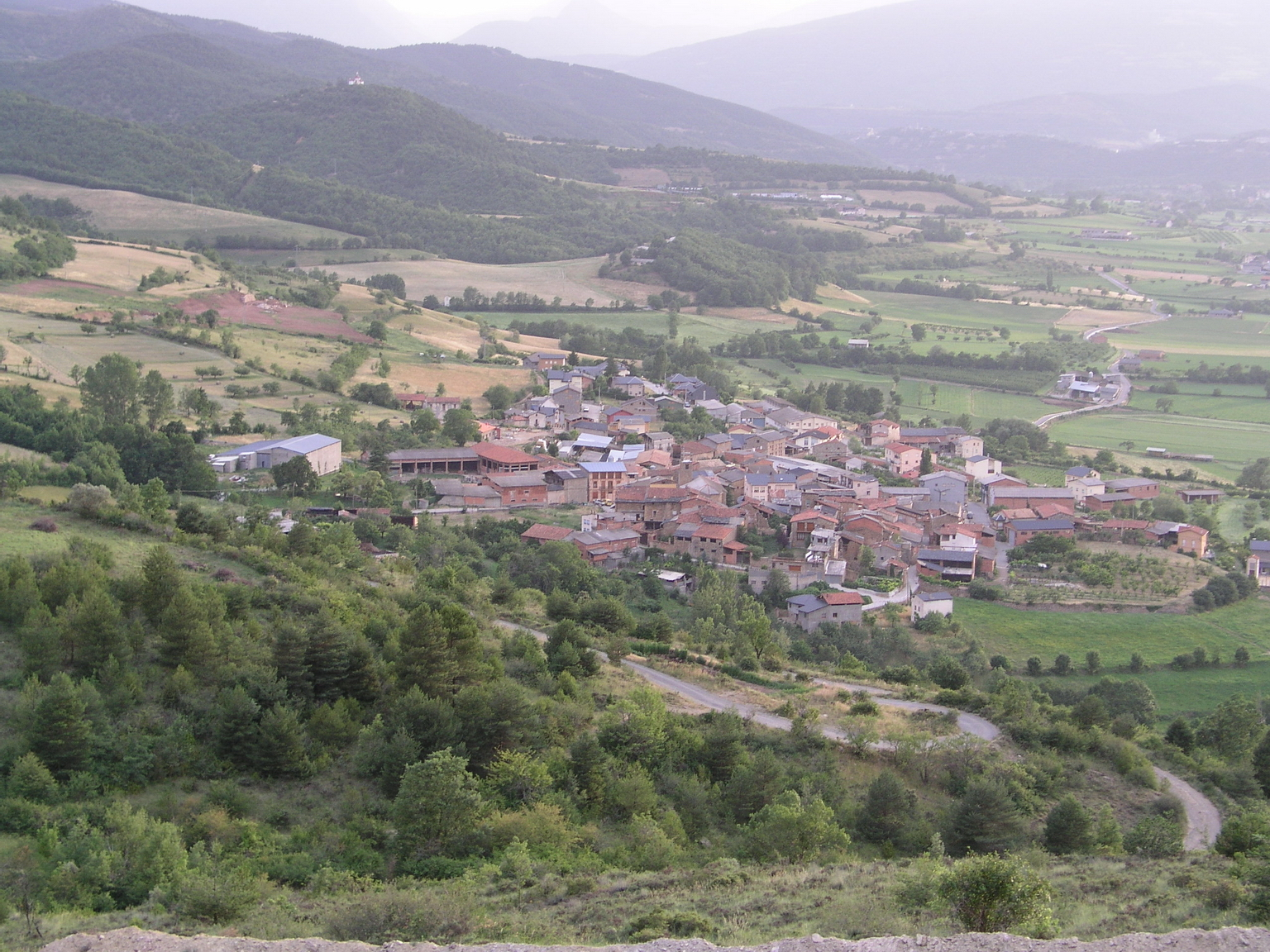
- Alàs i Cerc

- Flag Coat of arms

- Location in Catalonia
- Coordinates: 42°21′13″N 1°30′33″E
- Country: Spain
- Community: Catalonia
- Province: Lleida
- Comarca: Alt Urgell

Government
  - Mayor: Mari Carmen Ribó Domenjó (2015)

Area
  - Total: 57.7 km^{2} (22.3 sq mi)

Population (2025-01-01)
  - Total: 320
  - Density: 5.5/km^{2} (14/sq mi)
- Website: alascerc.ddl.net

Alàs i Cerc (Catalan pronunciation: [aˈlaz i ˈseɾk]) is a municipality in the comarca of Alt Urgell, Lleida, Catalonia, Spain. It has a population of 320 (register office, 2025).
