= Cabó =

- Municipality
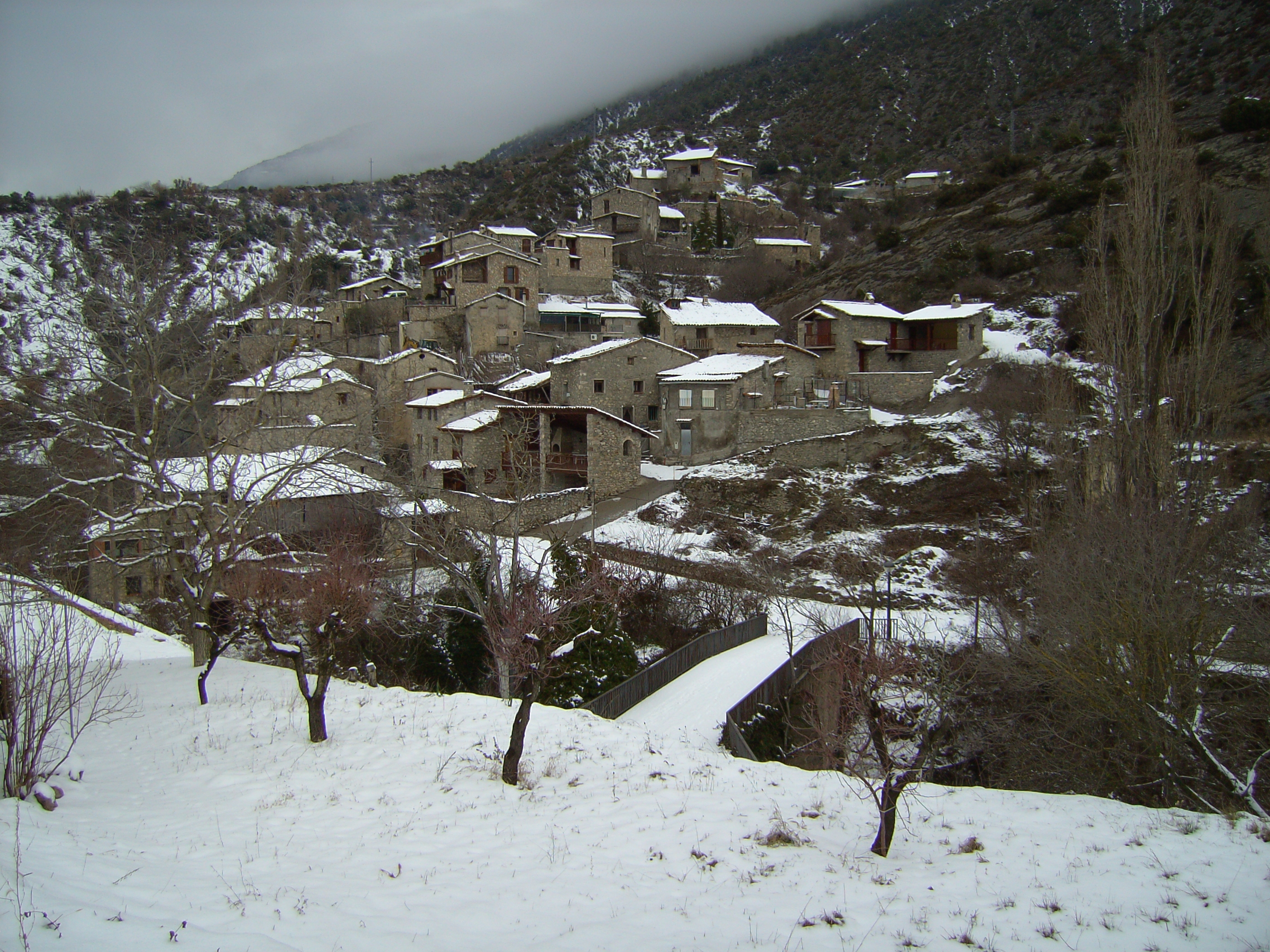
- Cabó

- Flag Coat of arms

- Location in Catalonia Cabó (Catalonia) Cabó (Spain)
- Coordinates: 42.240°N 1.249°E
- Country: Spain
- Community: Catalonia
- Province: Lleida
- Comarca: Alt Urgell

Government
  - Mayor: Josep Marquès Castany (2015)

Area
  - Total: 80.3 km^{2} (31.0 sq mi)

Population (2025-01-01)
  - Total: 85
  - Density: 1.1/km^{2} (2.7/sq mi)
- Website: cabo.ddl.net

Cabó (Catalan pronunciation: [kaˈβo]) is a municipality in the comarca of Alt Urgell, Lleida, Catalonia, Spain. It has a population of 85 (register office, 2025).

The municipality contains three villages: Cabó, el Vilar de Cabó, and Pujal. It includes a small exclave to the south-east.
