= Imma Costa =

Spanish politician (1962–2024)

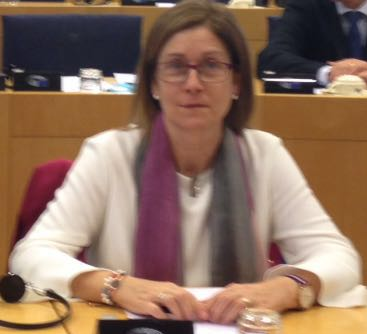
- Costa in 2016

Member of the Senate of Spain
- In office 10 January 2023 – 29 May 2023
- Constituency: Tarragona

Mayor of El Montmell
- In office 2003–2019
- Succeeded by: José María Roldán

Personal details
- Born: María Inmaculada Costa Ramón; 25 November 1962 El Montmell, Province of Tarragona, Spain
- Died: 15 May 2024 (aged 61)
- Party: Socialists' Party of Catalonia

María Inmaculada Costa Ramón (25 November 1962 – 15 May 2024) was a Spanish politician of the Socialists' Party of Catalonia (PSC). She was the mayor of El Montmell from 2003 to 2019 and briefly served as a member of the Senate of Spain in 2023.

== Biography ==
Born in El Montmell, Province of Tarragona on 25 November 1962, Costa worked in administration in her hometown's council. She was then elected to it in 1999, becoming deputy mayor. In 2003, she was elected mayor, renewing her mandate three times until 2019, when she was defeated by José María Roldán of ARA El Montmell. She was part of the council of the comarca of Baix Penedès from 2003 to 2007, then its vice president until 2011. She was a member of the Provincial Deputation of Tarragona from 2011 to 2015 and then again from 2019 to 2023, serving as its third-vice president as of her death.

On 10 January 2023, Costa became a member of the Senate of Spain, having been a supplementary member on the PSC list in the Tarragona constituency in the November 2019 Spanish general election. She served until the dissolution of the legislature on 29 May.

Costa died on 15 May 2024, aged 61. The Provincial Deputation declared three days of mourning.
