= Cunit =

- Municipality
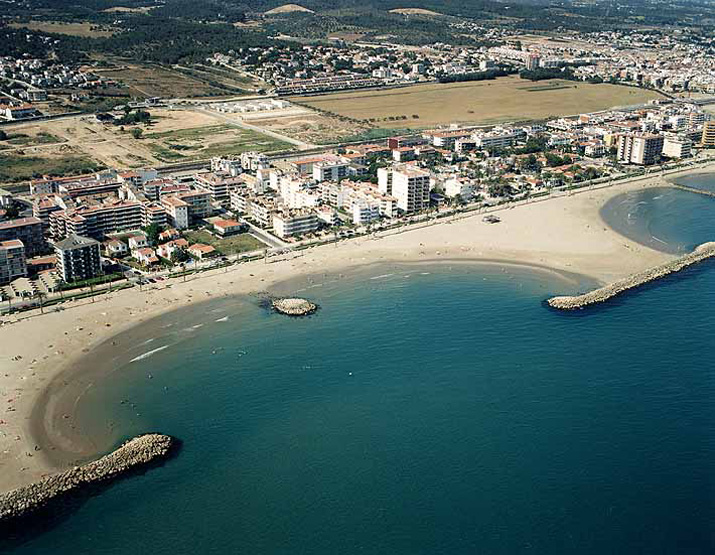

- Flag Coat of arms

- Location of Cunit within Baix Penedès, Catalonia

- Location in Catalonia
- Coordinates: 41°11′54″N 1°38′26″E
- Country: Spain

Government
  - mayor: Montserrat Carreras García (2015)

Area
  - Total: 9.7 km^{2} (3.7 sq mi)
- Elevation: 10 m (33 ft)

Population (2025-01-01)
  - Total: 16,385
  - Density: 1,700/km^{2} (4,400/sq mi)
- Postal code: 43881
- Area code: 977
- Website: cunit.cat

Cunit (Catalan pronunciation: [kuˈnit]) is a coastal town on the Golden Coast (Costa Daurada in Catalan) in the Baix Penedès region part of the province of Tarragona in Catalonia, Spain. It is on the northeast coast of Spain on the Mediterranean Sea. It has a population of 16,385 (register office, 2025).

== Location and site ==
It is located in the district of Baix Penedès and the province of Tarragona but is included in the third crown of the Urban Region of Barcelona. Bordered by Segur de Calafell (location of the municipality of Calafell), in the same area, as well as Cubelles in the district of Garraf and Castellet i la Gornal in the region of Alt Penedès, both from the province of Barcelona. The town has a rail link to Barcelona and further north as it forms part of the Rodalies de Catalunya regional railway network.

== History, culture and art ==
Cunit origins date back to prehistoric times, with archaeological remains found dating back to 3700 BC.

=== First settlers ===
The first settlers are documented in a total of six well-documented sources.

This is a large and dispersed settlement. It is similar to neighbouring coastal settlements of the Baix Penedès which used to trade a great deal with punicobusitans traders. A relationship that no doubt had its own weight in the transformation of the habits and customs of the early settlers.

==== Land ====
- Departament de Cultura i Educació de la Generalitat de Catalunya
- Fondo d'en Roig

=== Architectural heritage and Edificio Los Diamantes ===
- Historical and artistic heritage of Cunit

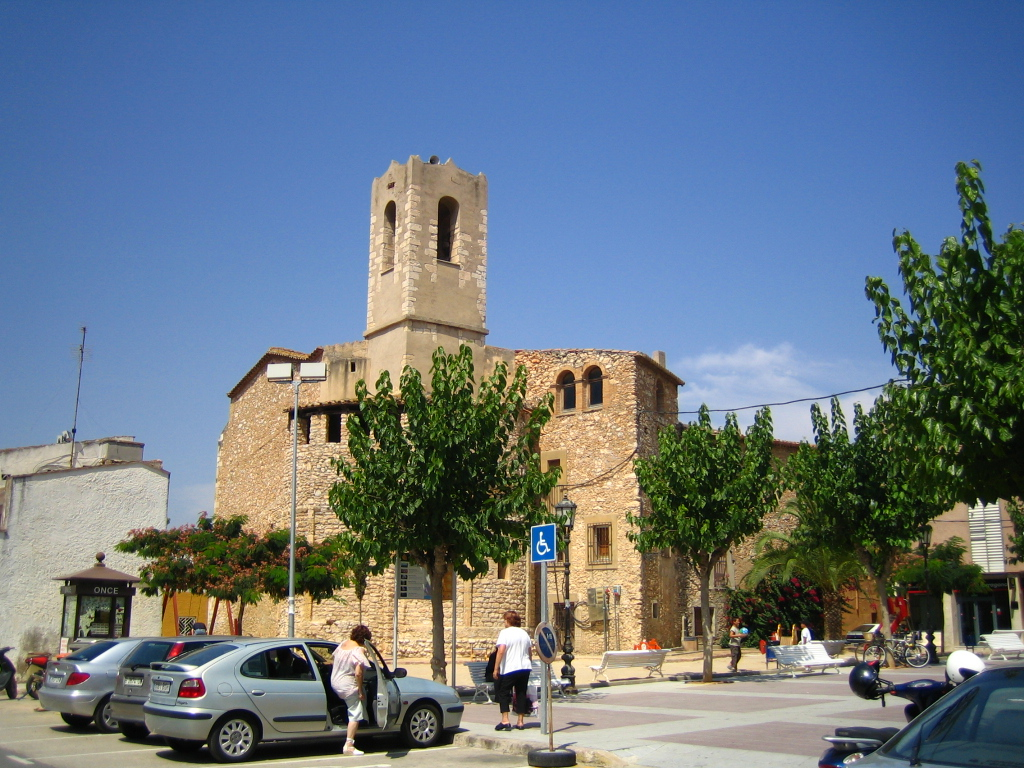
Plaça Catalunya, known as Plaça del Casal

== Demographics ==
The 1590, although the town had been almost depopulated by the incursions of the Saracen pirates and Turkey (1581), the Mas of Vilaseca remained populated. There are also references to a fishing settlement on the beach, documented in 1638 in 1670, residents from time immemorial were licensed to fish on Sundays and religious holidays, on payment of a stipend of one tenth of the catch to the local parish.

From 1960, Cunit began to become a summer vacation centre for the BarcelonaMetropolitan Area. At the same time, it started to become a major residential area of the Golden Coast

== Climate ==
Mediterranean climate provides mild winters and hot summers.

Climate data for Cunit
Month	Jan	Feb	Mar	Apr	May	Jun	Jul	Aug	Sep	Oct	Nov	Dec	Year
Mean daily maximum °F (°C)	62.8 (17.1)	67.6 (19.8)	72.1 (22.3)	73.8 (23.2)	81.0 (27.2)	82.6 (28.1)	89.2 (31.8)	90.3 (32.4)	84.7 (29.3)	79.9 (26.6)	73.8 (23.2)	67.5 (19.7)	77.1 (25.1)
Mean daily minimum °F (°C)	35.1 (1.7)	34.9 (1.6)	37.2 (2.9)	43.0 (6.1)	53.2 (11.8)	54.0 (12.2)	65.5 (18.6)	63.3 (17.4)	56.5 (13.6)	55.6 (13.1)	45.7 (7.6)	36.9 (2.7)	48.4 (9.1)
Average precipitation inches (mm)	5.25 (133.4)	0.18 (4.6)	0.26 (6.6)	0.25 (6.4)	0.68 (17.2)	0.08 (2.0)	0.06 (1.4)	1.22 (31.0)	3.87 (98.4)	1.48 (37.6)	0.24 (6.0)	1.27 (32.2)	14.84 (376.8)
Source: Darrera

=== Environment ===
==== Beaches ====
One of the main attractions of the town are the 2 and a half kilometers of sandy beaches in the form of golden beaches, protected by seven longitudinal breakwaters and four in the form of islands. These breakwaters had to be built in the early 1980s due to construction of the reservoir of Foix and the ports of Cubelles (to the north) and Segur de Calafell (to the south) which caused a disruption of the morphodynamic equilibrium, the effect being a visible loss of the beaches. Since 1997 it has been receiving the award of blue flag given by the European Foundation for Environmental Education.

==== Coast management ====
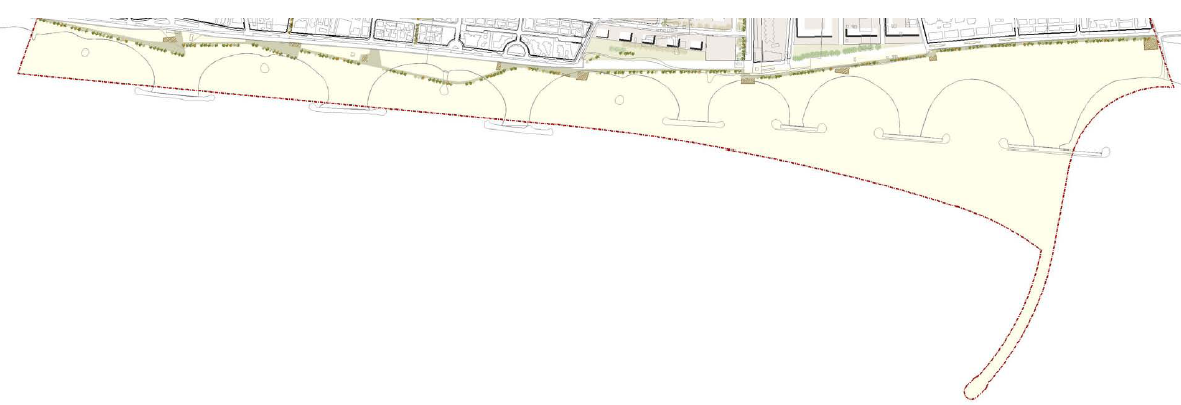
Proposed reform of the coastline - Comparison with the situation in 2007

The concentration of large environmental infrastructure on the territory and the coast, as the future Cubelles marina, the existence of a combined cycle thermal plant, the location of a desalination plant has opened a debate that includes a beach protection enhancement project developed for the Spanish Coastal Authority following guidelines for littoral enhancement set by the Ministry of the Environment's coastal zone management plan. This long stretch of beach constitutes probably the most important asset of the Municipality of Cunit which relies on tourism as the main income source. The coastal front development combined with beach erosion in the 1980s resulted in beach protection with detached breakwaters creating a series of pocket beaches. Despite to the strong armouring of the coast, erosion problems are still evident and critical at some points of the coast, as well as flooding. On the other hand, the existing structures represent also a hazardous condition for swimmers. As a result, a critical analysis of the existing structures has been overtaken, which together with detailed analysis of the coastal processes, have allowed to provide a new solution, replacing the hard structures with soft protection.

Currently awaiting to receive the report on the management of beaches commissioned the University of Cantabria to adopt a solution to the coastal areas of Cunit.

==== Seabed ====
World Wide Fund for Nature proposes to town for inclusion in the official lists of Site of Community Importance for the maritime grasslands described as Posidonia oceanica.
