= No Fem el CIM =

Coordinates: 41°30′N 1°58′E

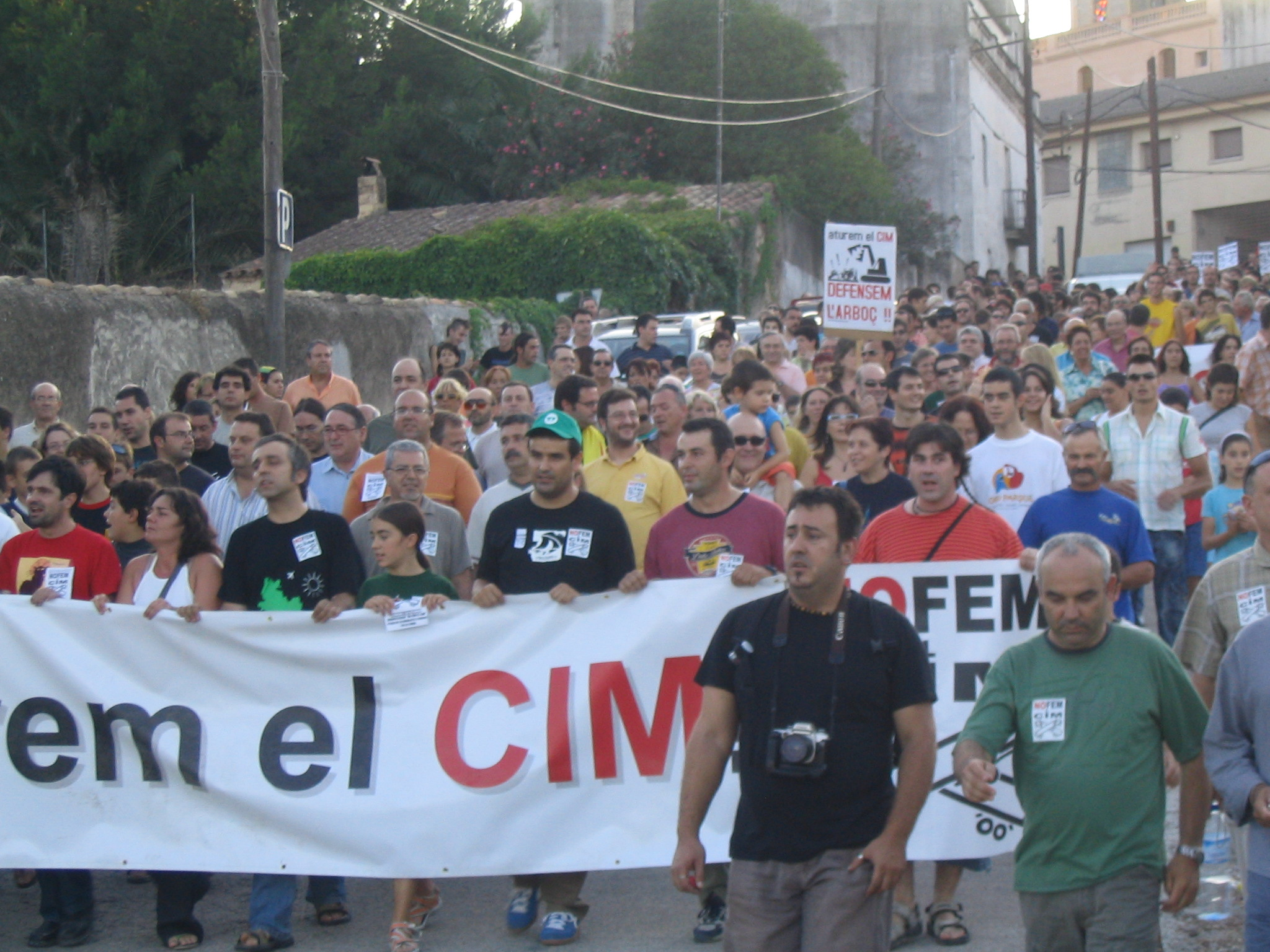
Manifestació de la Plataforma "No Fem el CIM" a l'Arboç, 08/2006

The "No fem el CIM" (NFC) movement was founded in 2003 in the Penedès region of Catalonia. It was then that locals learned that the Catalan government wanted to construct a dry port between the towns of Banyeres del Penedès, l'Arboç i Sant Jaume dels Domenys. However, it was not until August 2005 that the movement began to take-off, gaining national recognition, spurred by the release of the government's 544 acre (220 hectare) plan for the inland port. Since then, members of the movement have held numerous protests as well as meetings with local and national government entities in an attempt to prevent dry port construction. The movement proposes alternatives for the land reserved for the logistics project.

== Support ==
At the end of 2008, the groups that had come out in support of the NFC movement included:

- 1 Mayor Board of Baix Penedès
- 2 County Boards and Commissions: Baix Penedès, Alt Penedès
- 14 City Councils: l'Arboç, Banyeres del Penedès, Bellvei, la Bisbal del Penedès, la Granada, Llorenç del Penedès, Sant Jaume dels Domenys, Torrelavit, Olesa de Bonesvalls, Sant Pere de Riudebitlles, Cunit, El Vendrell, Vilafranca del Penedès i Vilanova i la Geltrú.
- 5 Business Associations
- 5 Labor Unions
- 7 Environmental Groups
- 9 Foundations and Associations
- 54 Cultural Groups
- various national and local political groups
- 5.385 Catalan residents
- 1.120 allegation to the PTPCT (planification of Tarragona Area)

== Structure ==
The "No fem el CIM" movement is a grassroots movement that operates by means of five autonomous committees:

- The NFC Communication Committee
- The NFC Publicity Committee
- The NFC Fundraising Committee
- The NFC Political Action Committee
- The NFC Legal Action Committee
