= Bonastre =

- Municipality
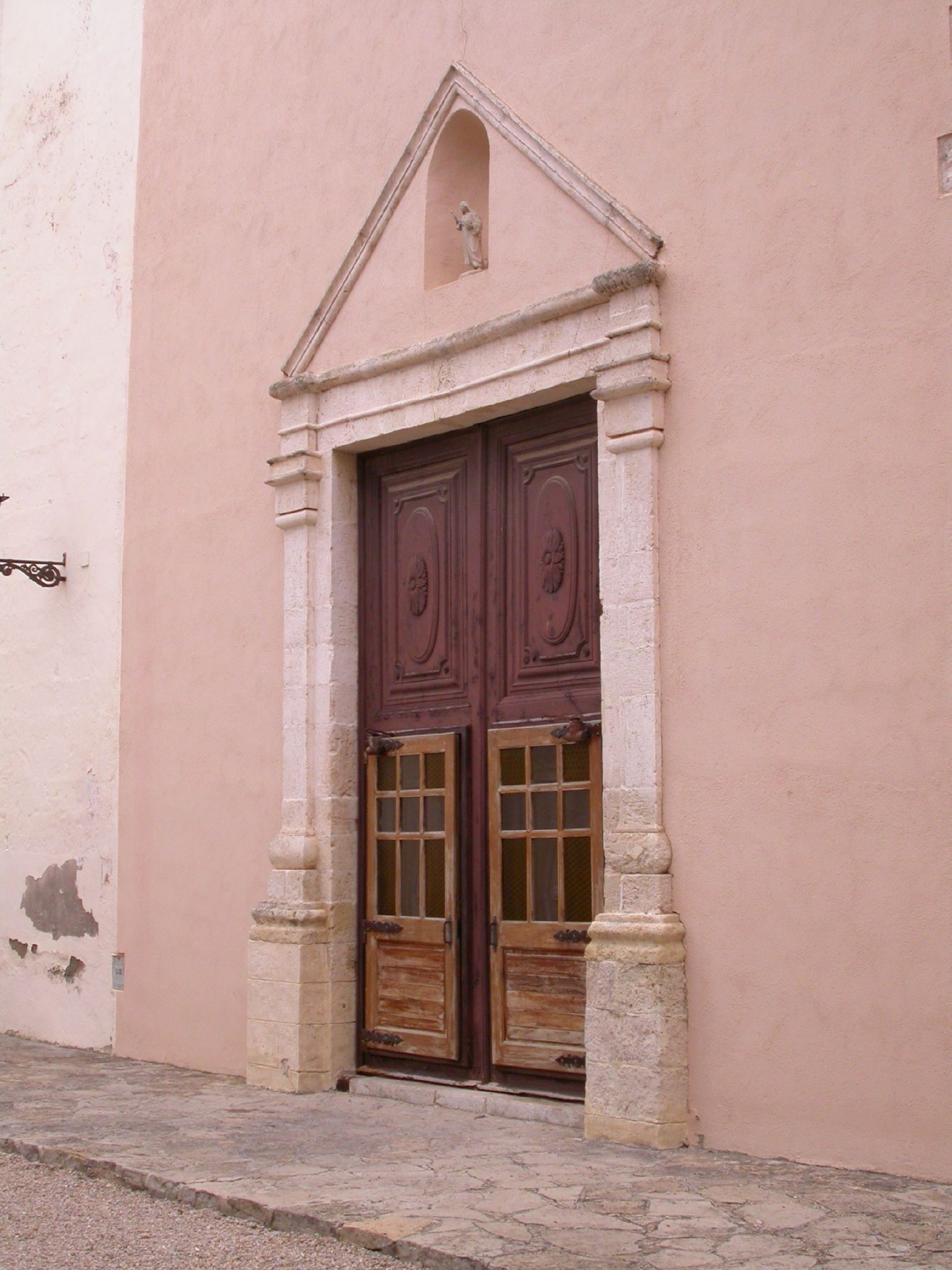
- Santa Magdalena church door

- Flag Coat of arms

- Location in Catalonia
- Coordinates: 41.221°N 1.440°E
- Country: Spain
- Community: Catalonia
- Province: Tarragona
- Comarca: Baix Penedès

Government
  - Mayor: David Godall Sanroma (2015)

Area
  - Total: 25.0 km^{2} (9.7 sq mi)
- Elevation: 182 m (597 ft)

Population (2025-01-01)
  - Total: 777
  - Density: 31.1/km^{2} (80.5/sq mi)
- Website: www.bonastre.altanet.org

Bonastre (Catalan pronunciation: [buˈnastɾə]) is a municipality in the comarca of the Baix Penedès in Catalonia, Spain. It is situated in the west of the comarca in the Quadrell range. It has a population of 777 (register office, 2025).

Bonastre became part of the Baix Penedès in the comarcal revision of 1990: previously it formed part of the Tarragonès.

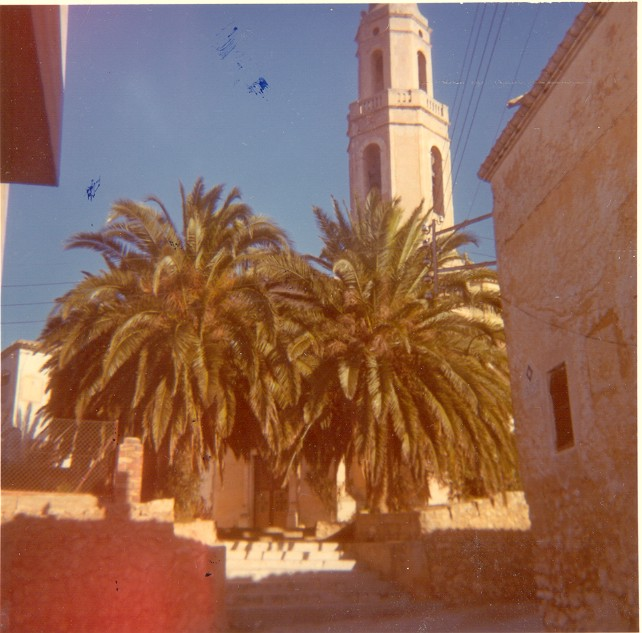
Bonastre Church

In 1178, Bernat de Papiol, who was lord of the place, donated it to the Monastery of St Cugat. In 1382, King Pedro IV took possession of Bonastre for the crown although the monastery continued to govern the village until the 17th century.

During the Trienio Liberal Bonastre supported the royalists. In 1822, the town was attacked by a party of militia and was left deserted as its inhabitants fled to the surrounding mountains. However, the militia were attacked by royalist troops when they left Bonastre and routed.

The 19th-century parish church is dedicated to St Magdalene. It was built on the site of an ancient Romanesque temple which was destroyed in 1849. It consists of a single building covered by a cylindrical vault, with small interconnecting chapels at the side. The baptistry and sanctuary stand out. It was the work of a modernistic architect Josep Maria Jujol. Another notable building is a 19th-century house known as “can Fontanilles”. It has some interesting graphics on its façade, which include the arms of Bonastre and Catalonia

The main festival at Bonastre takes place in July under the feast of St Magdalena.

A local road links the village with Roda de Barà.

== Demographics ==
1900	1930	1950	1970	1986	2001
779	598	479	408	275	424

The village's economic base is agriculture, in the cultivation of vines, almonds, and olives.

== Bibliography ==
- Panareda Clopés, Josep Maria; Rios Calvet, Jaume; Rabella Vives, Josep Maria (1989). Guia de Catalunya, Barcelona: Caixa de Catalunya. ISBN 84-87135-01-3 (Spanish). ISBN 84-87135-02-1 (Catalan).
- Tomàs Bonell, Jordi; Descobrir Catalunya, poble a poble, Prensa Catalana, Barcelona, 1994
