= Llorenç del Penedès =

- Municipality
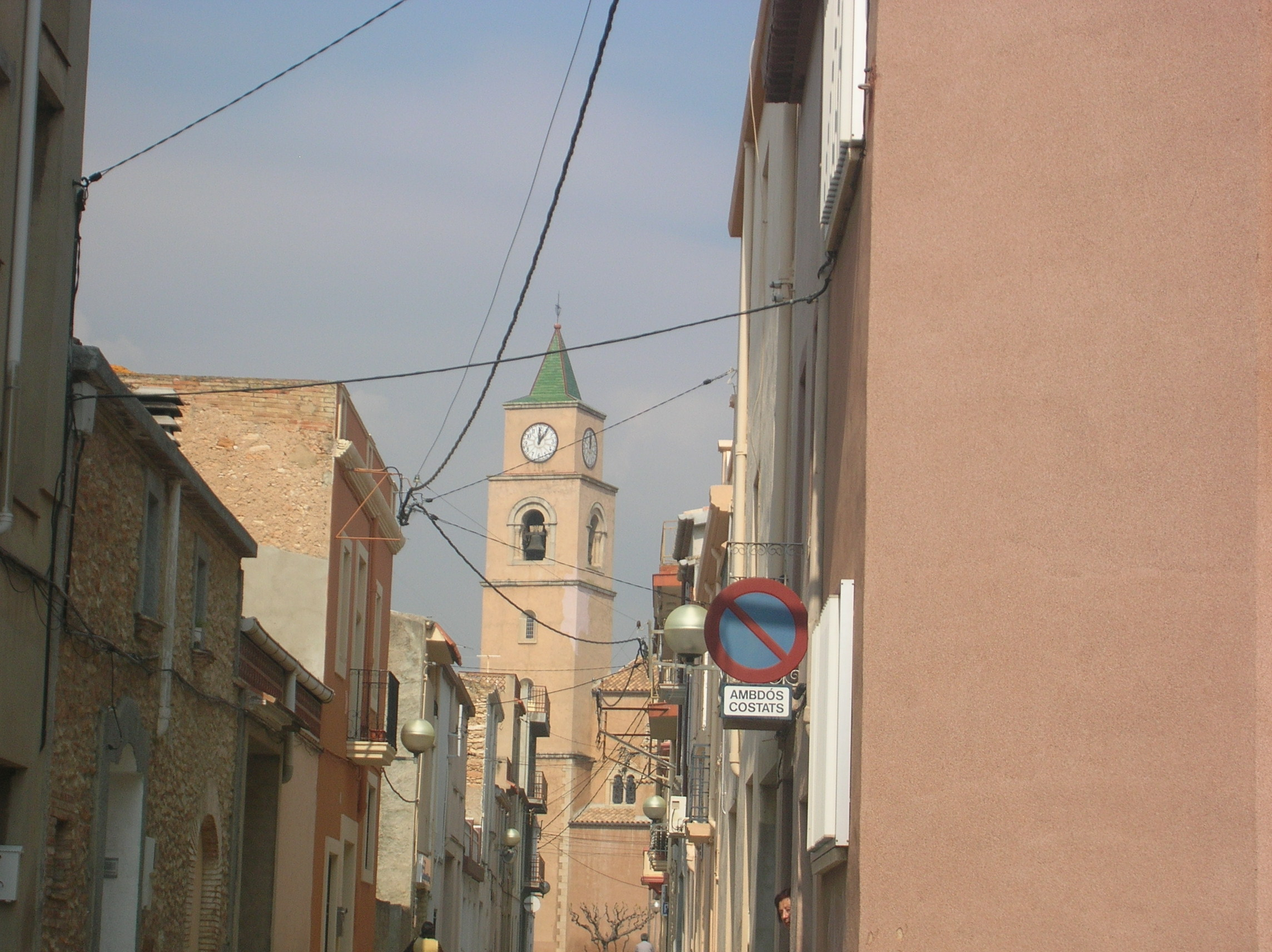

- Flag Coat of arms

- Location in Catalonia Llorenç del Penedès (Catalonia) Llorenç del Penedès (Spain)
- Coordinates: 41°17′9″N 1°33′12″E
- Country: Spain
- Community: Catalonia
- Province: Tarragona
- Comarca: Baix Penedès

Government
  - Mayor: Jordi Marles Ribas (2015)

Area
  - Total: 4.6 km^{2} (1.8 sq mi)
- Elevation: 162 m (531 ft)

Population (2025-01-01)
  - Total: 2,425
  - Density: 530/km^{2} (1,400/sq mi)
- Website: www.llorenc.cat

Llorenç del Penedès (Catalan pronunciation: [ʎuˈɾɛnz ðəl pənəˈðɛs]) is a village in the province of Tarragona and autonomous community of Catalonia, Spain. It has a population of 2,425 (register office, 2025).
