= L'Arboç =

- Municipality
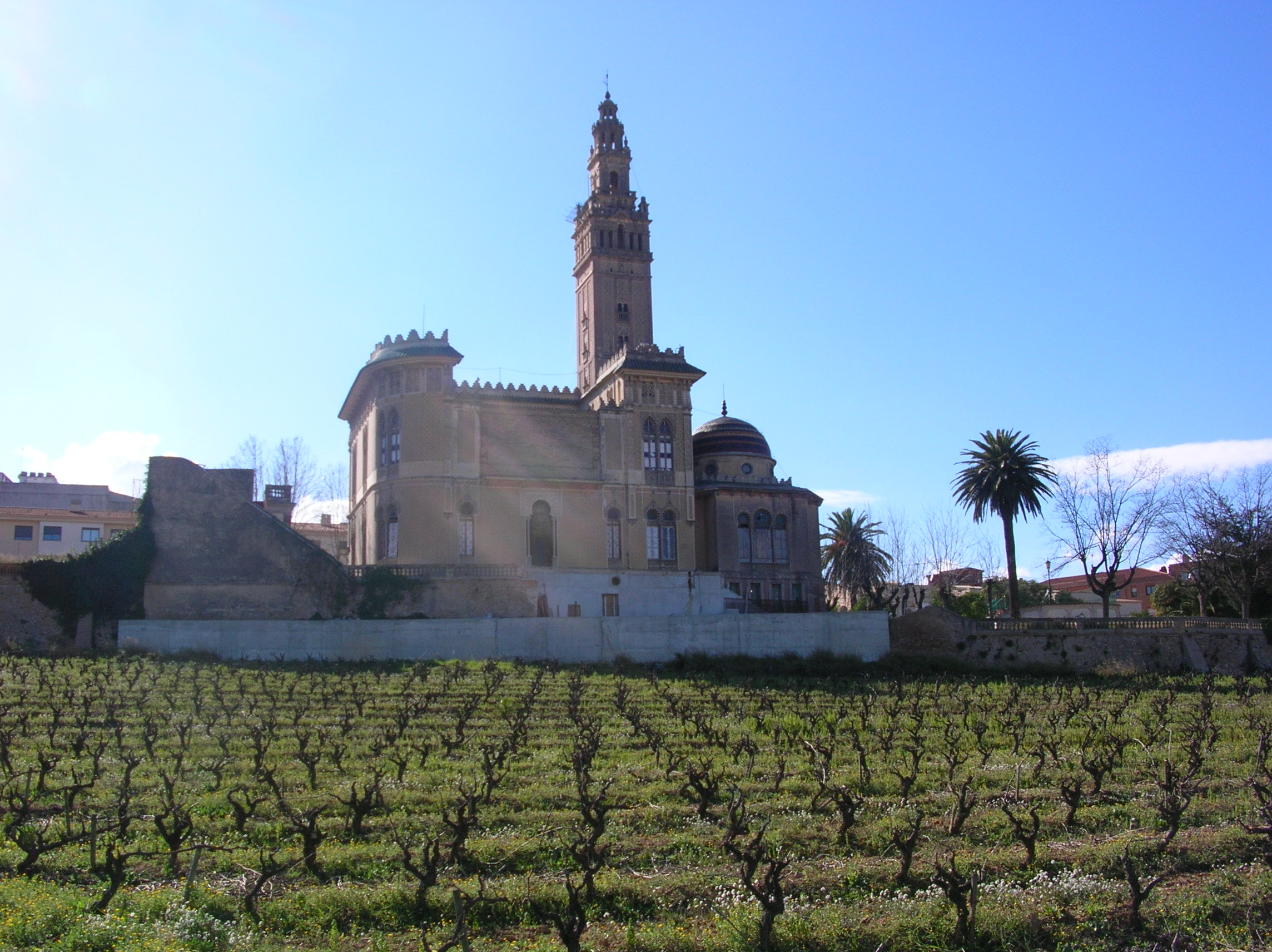
- "La Giralda", L'Arboç

- Coat of arms

- Location in Catalonia
- Coordinates: 41°16′8″N 1°36′16″E
- Country: Spain
- Community: Catalonia
- Province: Tarragona
- Comarca: Baix Penedès

Government
  - Mayor: Joan Sans Freixas (2015)

Area
  - Total: 14.1 km^{2} (5.4 sq mi)

Population (2025-01-01)
  - Total: 5,721
  - Density: 406/km^{2} (1,050/sq mi)
- Website: arbocenc.org

L'Arboç (Catalan pronunciation: [ləɾˈβos]) is a village in the province of Tarragona and autonomous community of Catalonia, Spain. It has a population of 5,721 (register office, 2025).

L'Arboç contains a half-scale replica of the La Giralda in Seville. The building also contains copies of the Court of the Lions from the Alhambra, and the Hall of the Ambassadors from the Alcázar of Seville. It also contains a reproduction of the Barcelona Columbus monument.

The municipality has an exclave to the north-east.

== See also ==
- No Fem el CIM
