= Masllorenç =

- Municipality
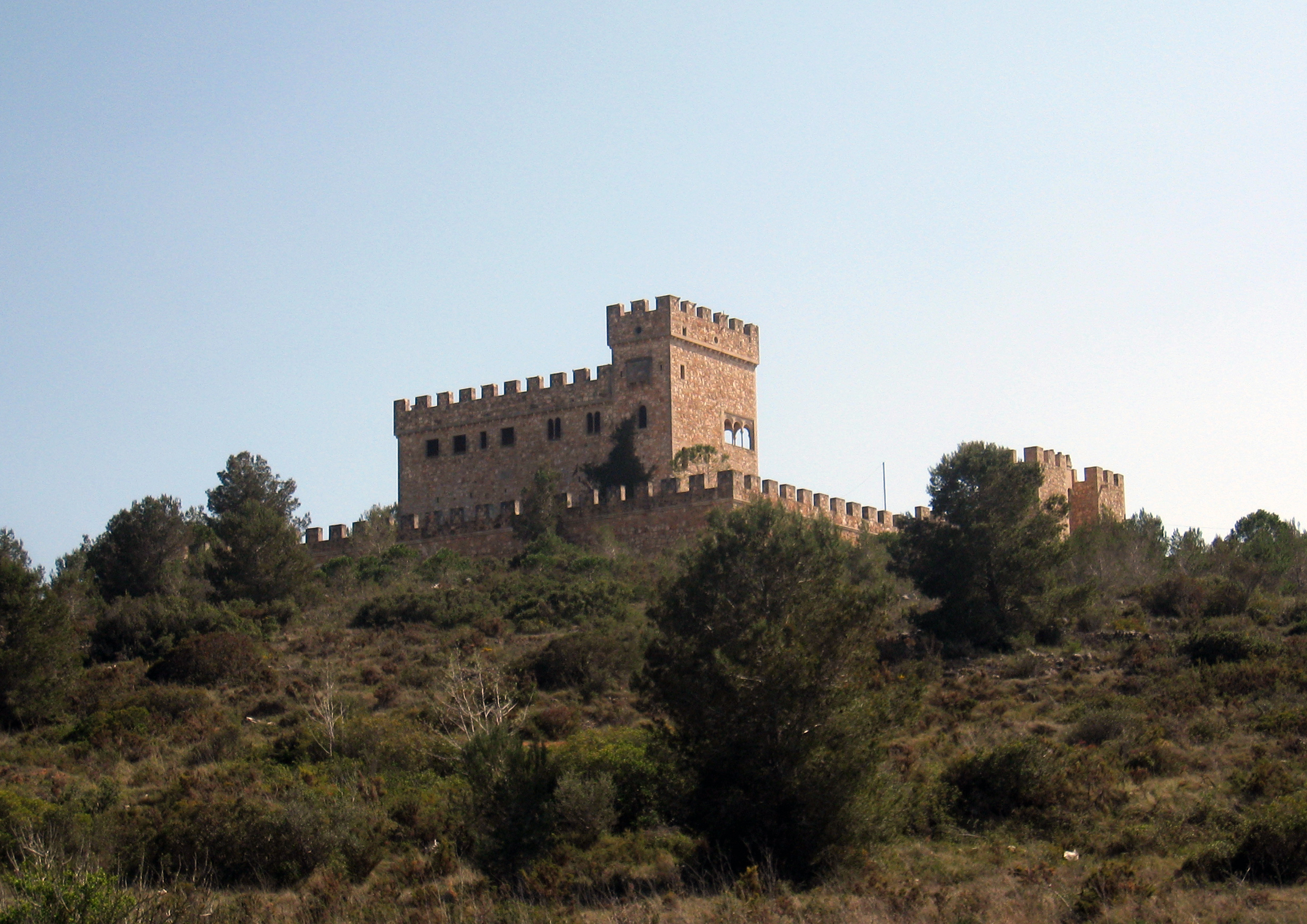
- Masllorenç castle

- Coat of arms

- Location in Catalonia
- Coordinates: 41°16′16″N 1°24′56″E
- Country: Spain
- Community: Catalonia
- Province: Tarragona
- Comarca: Baix Penedès

Government
  - Mayor: Nuria Manchado Llorens (2015)

Area
  - Total: 6.6 km^{2} (2.5 sq mi)
- Elevation: 320 m (1,050 ft)

Population (2025-01-01)
  - Total: 573
  - Density: 87/km^{2} (220/sq mi)
- Website: www.masllorenc.cat

Masllorenç (Catalan pronunciation: [ˌmazʎuˈɾɛns]) is a municipality in the comarca of the Baix Penedès in Catalonia, Spain. It is situated on the slopes of the Miramar range (864 m). A local road links the municipality with El Pla de Santa Maria, and with the A-2 autopista and the T-200 road. Masllorenç became part of the Baix Penedès in the comarcal revision of 1990: previously it formed part of the Alt Camp.

== Demographics ==
It has a population of 573 (register office, 2025).

1900	1930	1950	1970	1986	2001
911	812	634	460	418	453

== Bibliography ==
- Panareda Clopés, Josep Maria; Rios Calvet, Jaume; Rabella Vives, Josep Maria (1989). Guia de Catalunya, Barcelona: Caixa de Catalunya. ISBN 84-87135-01-3 (Spanish). ISBN 84-87135-02-1 (Catalan).
