= Bellvei =

- Municipality
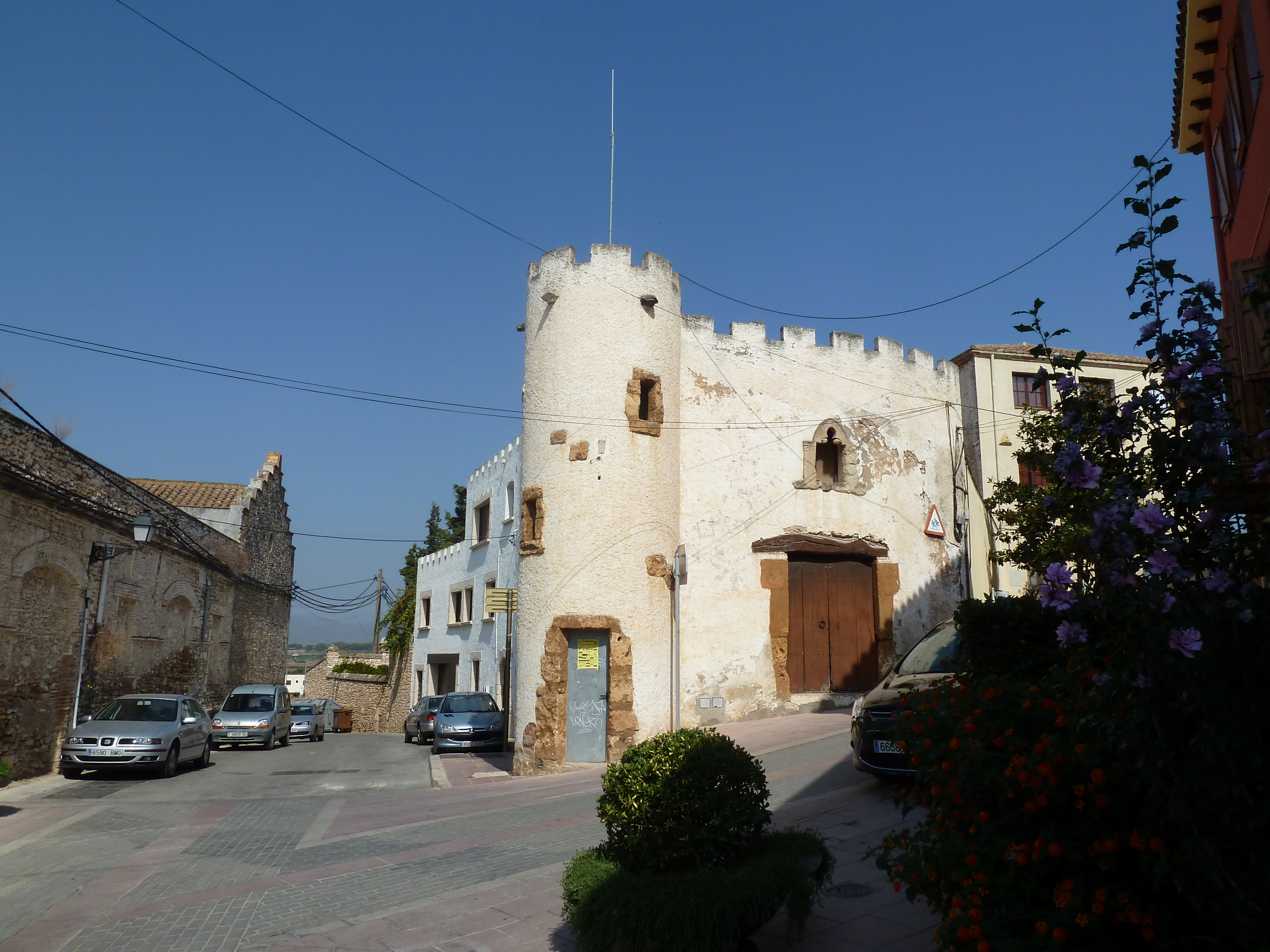

- Flag Coat of arms

- Location in Catalonia
- Coordinates: 41°14′33″N 1°34′43″E
- Country: Spain
- Community: Catalonia
- Province: Tarragona
- Comarca: Baix Penedès

Government
  - Mayor: Fèlix Sans Sans mañe (2015)

Area
  - Total: 8.3 km^{2} (3.2 sq mi)

Population (2025-01-01)
  - Total: 2,460
  - Density: 300/km^{2} (770/sq mi)
- Website: bellveidelpenedes.com

Bellvei (Old Catalan for 'beautiful neighborhood'; Catalan pronunciation: [bəʎˈβɛj]) is a village in the province of Tarragona and autonomous community of Catalonia, Spain. The municipality belongs to the Baix Penedès county and It has a population of 2,460 (register office, 2025).
