= Costa Daurada =

Area on the coast of Catalonia, Spain

Coordinates: 41°00′43″N 0°55′56″E

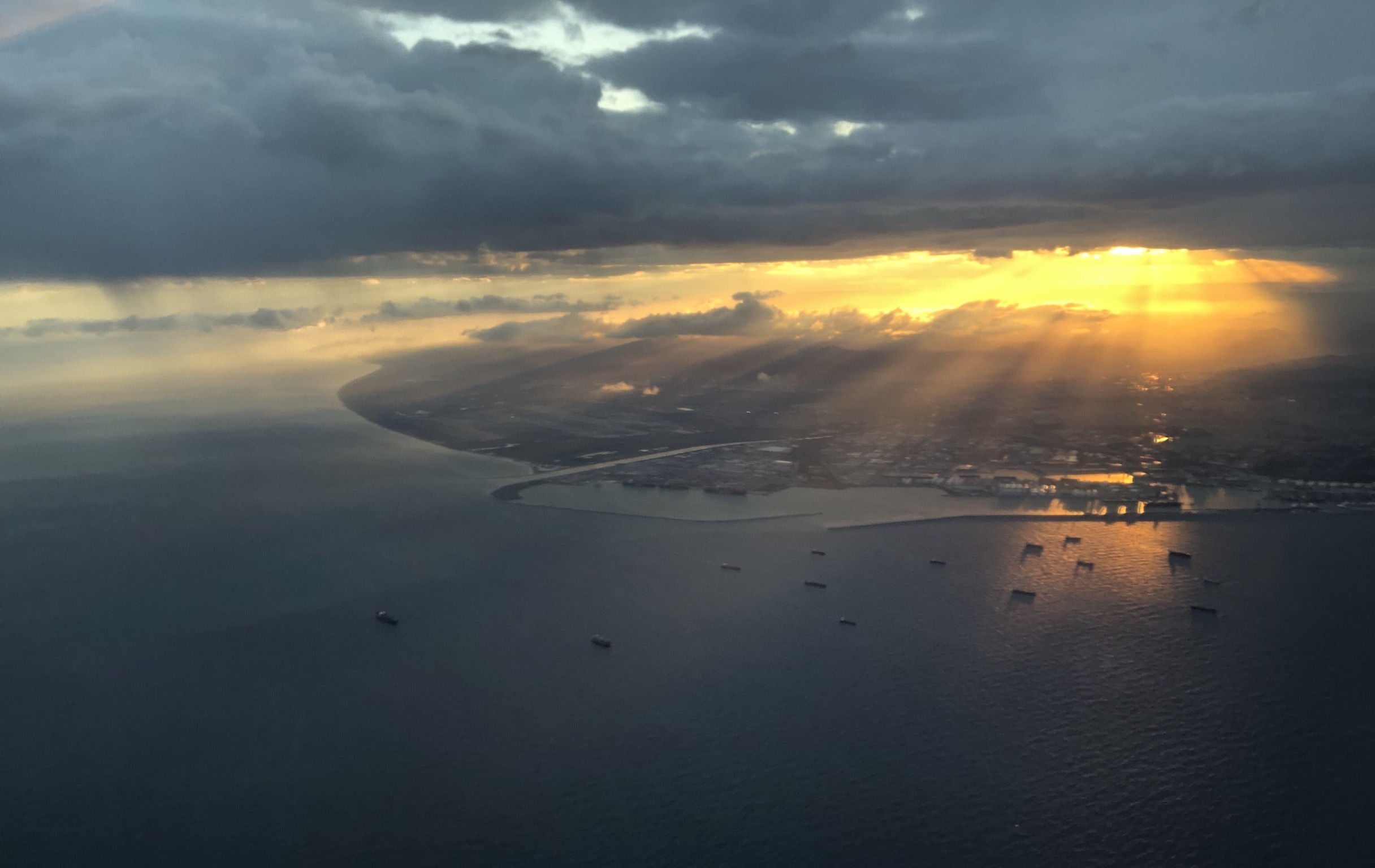
Costa Daurada seen during sunset

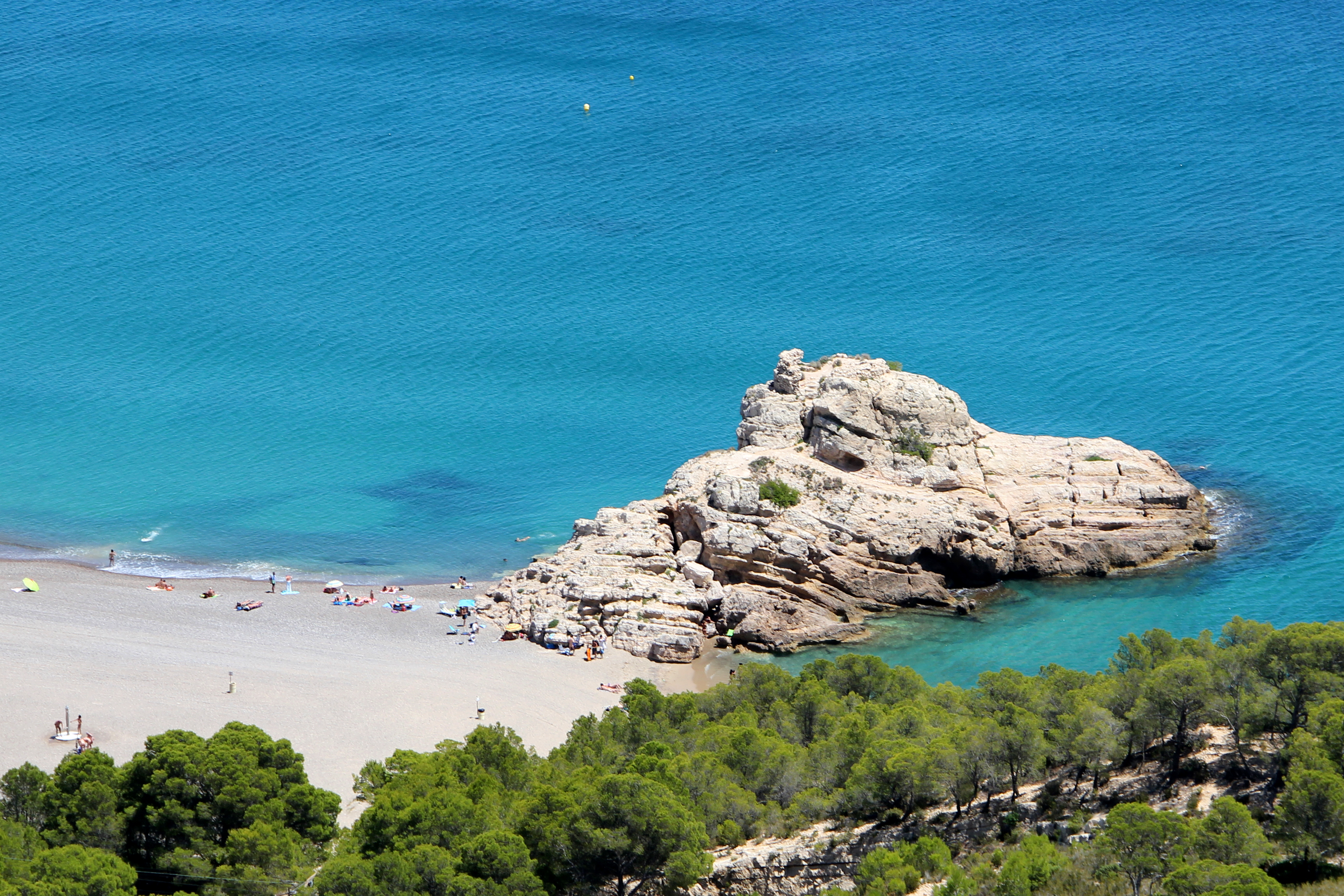
Torn Beach (platja del Torn), near l'Hospitalet de l'Infant

The Costa Daurada (Catalan: [ˈkɔstə ðəwˈɾaðə]; Spanish: Costa Dorada [ˈkosta ðoˈɾaða]; meaning in English 'Golden Coast') is an area on the coast of Catalonia, Spain, between Cunit and Alcanar on the Mediterranean Sea. Its traditional banks are the deltas of the Foix and Ebro rivers, although it mainly refers to the entire province of Tarragona. To the north it borders the Garraf Massif and it borders the Costa del Azahar to the south.

Places of interest include the El Vendrell beaches, the town of Roc de San Gaieta, the Roman Arch of Bará, the remains of Tarraco, declared a World Heritage Site and as well as several small towns or places such as Sant Carles de la Ràpita, with one of the best fishing ports in this entire coastal sector. Inland, the walled town of Montblanc and the Poblet Abbey stand out, where various kings of the Crown of Aragon lie. Another tourist attraction on the Costa Dorada is the PortAventura World amusement park.

== Etymology ==
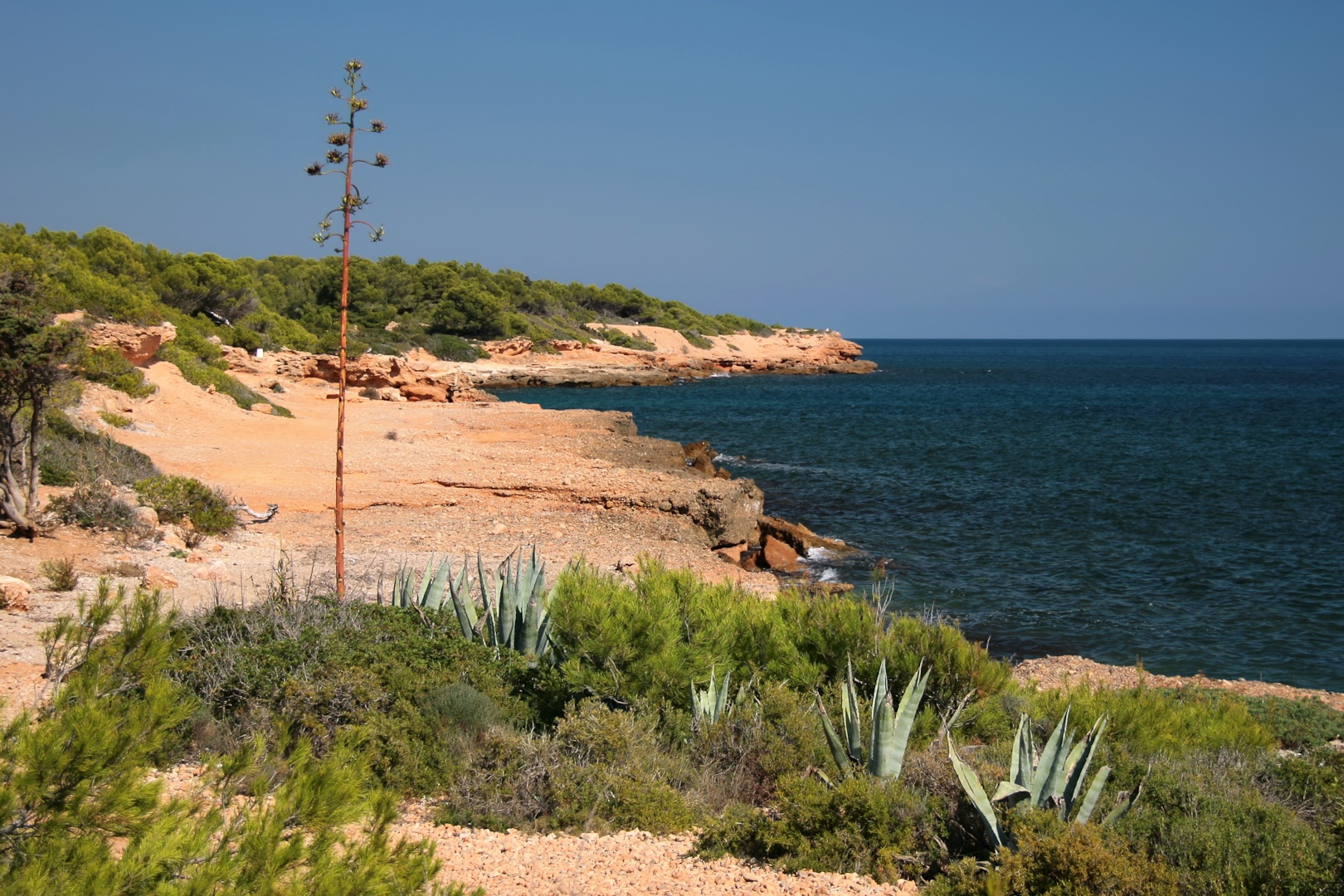
L'Ametlla de Mar

Costa Daurada, literally, the Golden Coast, takes its name from the colour of its sand when the sun is shining.

== Main centers ==
- Cunit
- Calafell
- Comarruga
- Tamarit
- Torredembarra
- Tarragona
- Cambrils
- Salou
- L'Ametlla de Mar
