= Banyeres del Penedès =

- Municipality
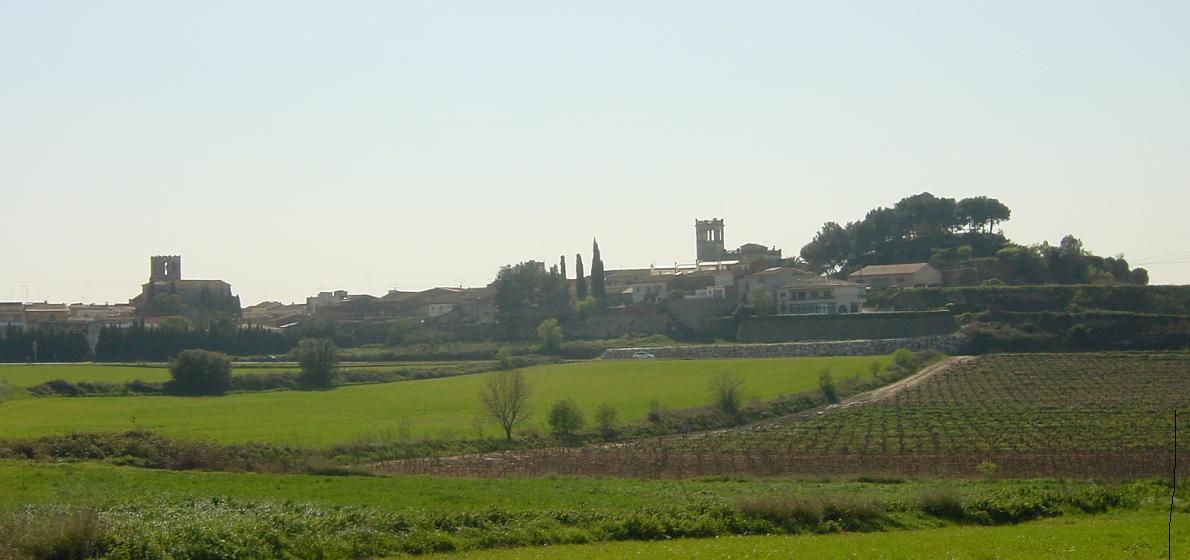
- Banyeres del Penedès

- Flag Coat of arms

- Location in Catalonia
- Coordinates: 41°16′55″N 1°34′56″E
- Country: Spain
- Community: Catalonia
- Province: Tarragona
- Comarca: Baix Penedès

Government
  - Mayor: Ana Dolores Ordoñez Rivero (2015)

Area
  - Total: 12.2 km^{2} (4.7 sq mi)

Population (2025-01-01)
  - Total: 3,395
  - Density: 278/km^{2} (721/sq mi)
- Website: www.banyeresdelpenedes.cat

Banyeres del Penedès (Catalan pronunciation: [bəˈɲeɾəz ðəl pənəˈðɛs]) is a village in the province of Tarragona and autonomous community of Catalonia, Spain. It has a population of 3,395 (register office, 2025).

== See also ==
- No Fem el CIM
