= Santa Oliva =

- Municipality
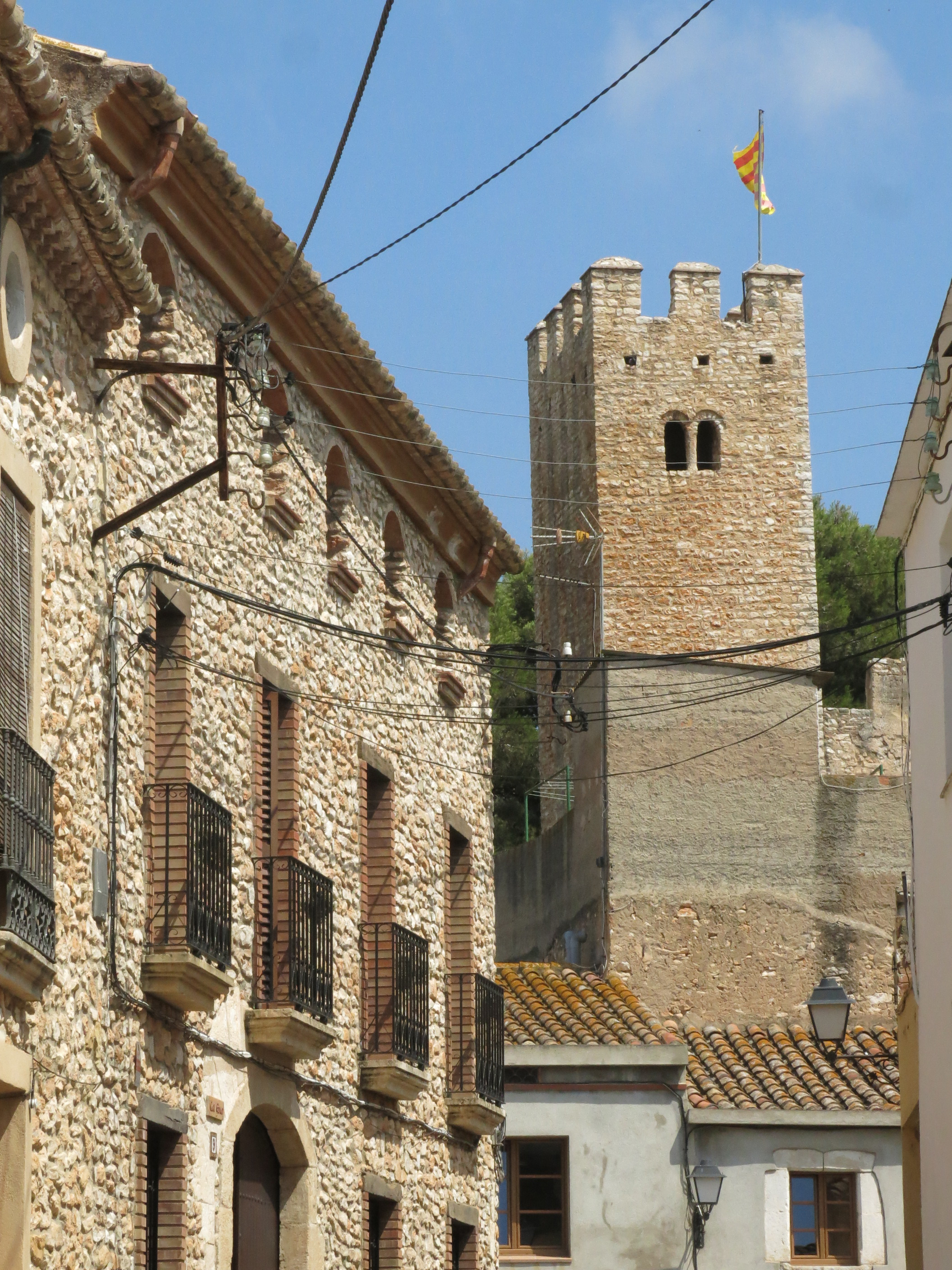
- Street and castle of Santa Oliva

- Coat of arms

- Location in Catalonia
- Coordinates: 41°15′N 1°33′E
- Country: Spain
- Community: Catalonia
- Province: Tarragona
- Comarca: Baix Penedès

Government
  - Mayor: Cristina Carreres Haro (2015)

Area
  - Total: 9.6 km^{2} (3.7 sq mi)

Population (2025-01-01)
  - Total: 3,711
  - Density: 390/km^{2} (1,000/sq mi)
- Website: www.santaoliva.cat

Santa Oliva (Catalan pronunciation: [ˌsantəwˈliβə]) is a village in the province of Tarragona and autonomous community of Catalonia, Spain. The municipality includes an exclave to the north-west. It has a population of 3,711 (register office, 2025).
