= Albinyana =

- municipality
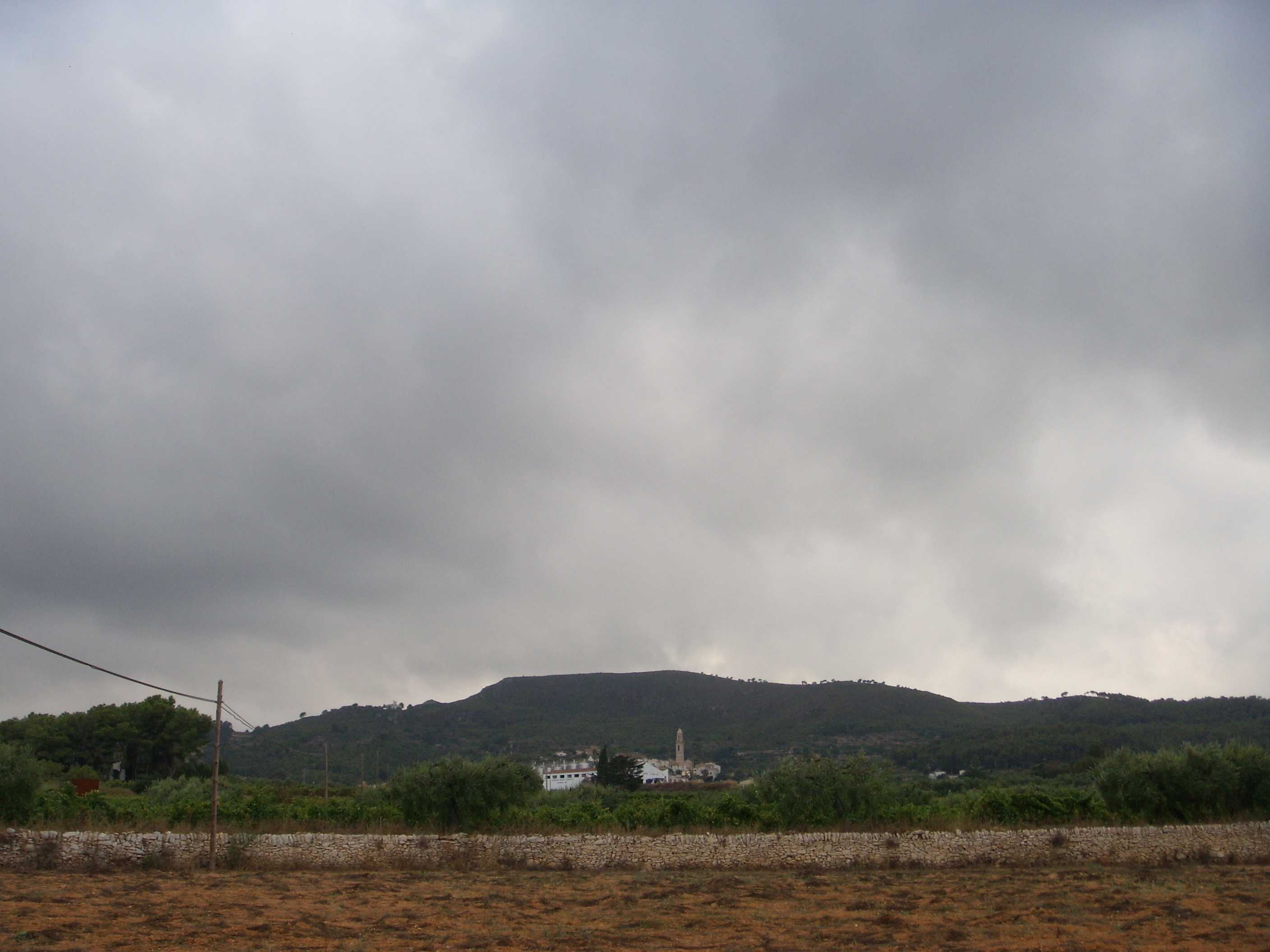
- Albinyana, at the foothills of the Coast Rovira, seen from a vineyard

- Coat of arms
- Nickname: Albiñana
- Location of Albinyana in Baix Penedès

- Location in Catalonia
- Coordinates: 41°14′52″N 1°29′21″E
- Country: Spain Spain
- Autonomous Communities of Spain: Catalonia
- Province: Tarragona
- Region: Baix Penedès

Government
  - Mayor: Quim Nin Borreda (2015)

Area
  - Total: 19.4 km^{2} (7.5 sq mi)

Population (2025-01-01)
  - Total: 2,718
  - Density: 140/km^{2} (363/sq mi)
- Postal code: 43718
- Website: www.albinyana.oasi.org

Albinyana (Catalan pronunciation: [əlβiˈɲanə]) is a village in the province of Tarragona and the autonomous community of Catalonia, Spain. It belongs to Tarragona in the Baix Penedès region. It has a population of 2,718 (register office, 2025).

== History ==
In the eleventh century, Viscount Guitard strategically built his castle in Albinyana, near the border and prone to Saracen attacks. His son Adalbert, who died during the Reconquista, bequeathed the place to the Monastery of Sant Cugat. In 1040, the monastery's abbot ceded the lands to Bernat Otger on the condition that he would rebuild the castle and take care of its defence. Due to its vulnerable location, the castle remained uninhabited for a long time. It belonged to the monks of Sant Cugat until the end of the lordships. There are no remains of the castle today, and the acknowledged location is the same place that forms the centre of the village today.

Two other fortifications also played a significant role in the local history. One is the old Esquena Roja castle, mentioned in documents from 1173. Shortly after that, it became a farmhouse. The other fortification is the Tomoví castle, although documents found seem to suggest that it was more of a fortified mansion, a structure with defensive features but not as extensive as a castle, than a castle itself.

== Historical buildings ==
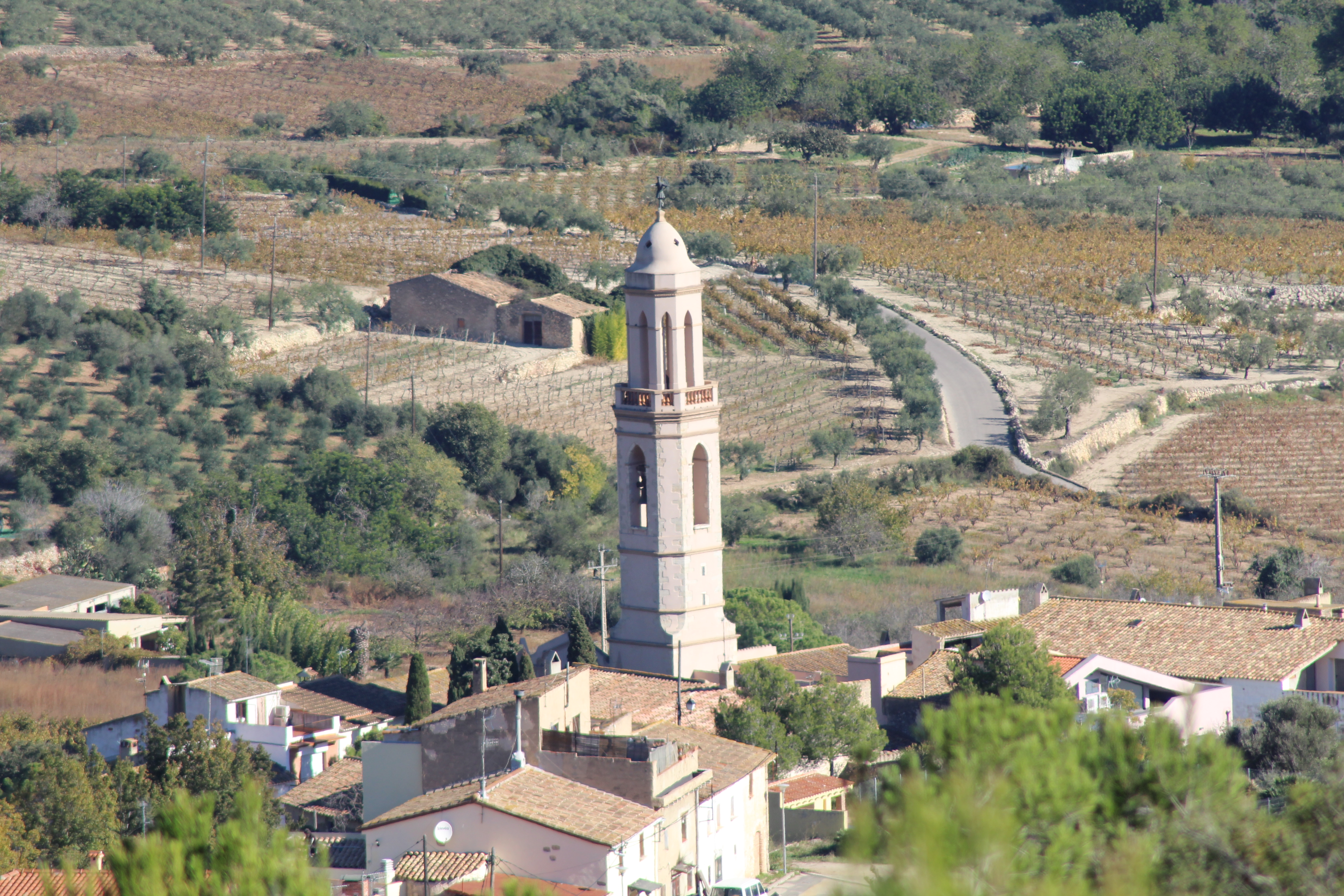
The Church of St. Bartholomew of Albinyana seen from the San Antonio de Padua hermitage.

The parish church is named St. Bartholomew. Although it is documented in 1120 as a possession of Sant Cugat monastery, the current church building dates only to the eighteenth century. It features a semicircular apse with a frieze and a window. The bell tower has a square base and a little angel statue at the top.

Another notable building in Plaça Major is Cal Pau Magí. This seventeenth-century structure has three floors. Inside is a lobby with a vaulted arch and stairs leading to the residential area, and the construction date (1637) is inscribed. It served as the former residence of the Sant Cugat administrator.

In Les Peces is a priory, known as Cal Gener, dating from the fifteenth and sixteenth centuries, and rebuilt in the eighteenth century. This large building has stone-framed windows; its façade features interesting sgraffiti restored in 1984. The sgraffiti depict human figures and various architectural and geometric elements. Cal Gener now operates as a house museum dedicated to rural tourism.

The hermitage of San Antonio of Padua is located on the outskirts of Albinyana. This eighteenth-century building has a rectangular floor plan and a gable roof. It features a barrel vault, external buttresses, and an attached bell tower, believed to be the old castle's defensive structure. It is on a small hill; the entire structure is painted white.

== Economy ==
The main economic activity is rainfed agriculture. The main crops are vineyards, grains, almonds, and hazelnuts. Until the mid-twentieth century, a significant industry was devoted to manufacturing palm baskets.

== Local celebrations ==
The town celebrates its festivals in July, coinciding with the Our Lady of Carmel, and on 24 August, the feast of Saint Bartholomew.

== Photo gallery ==
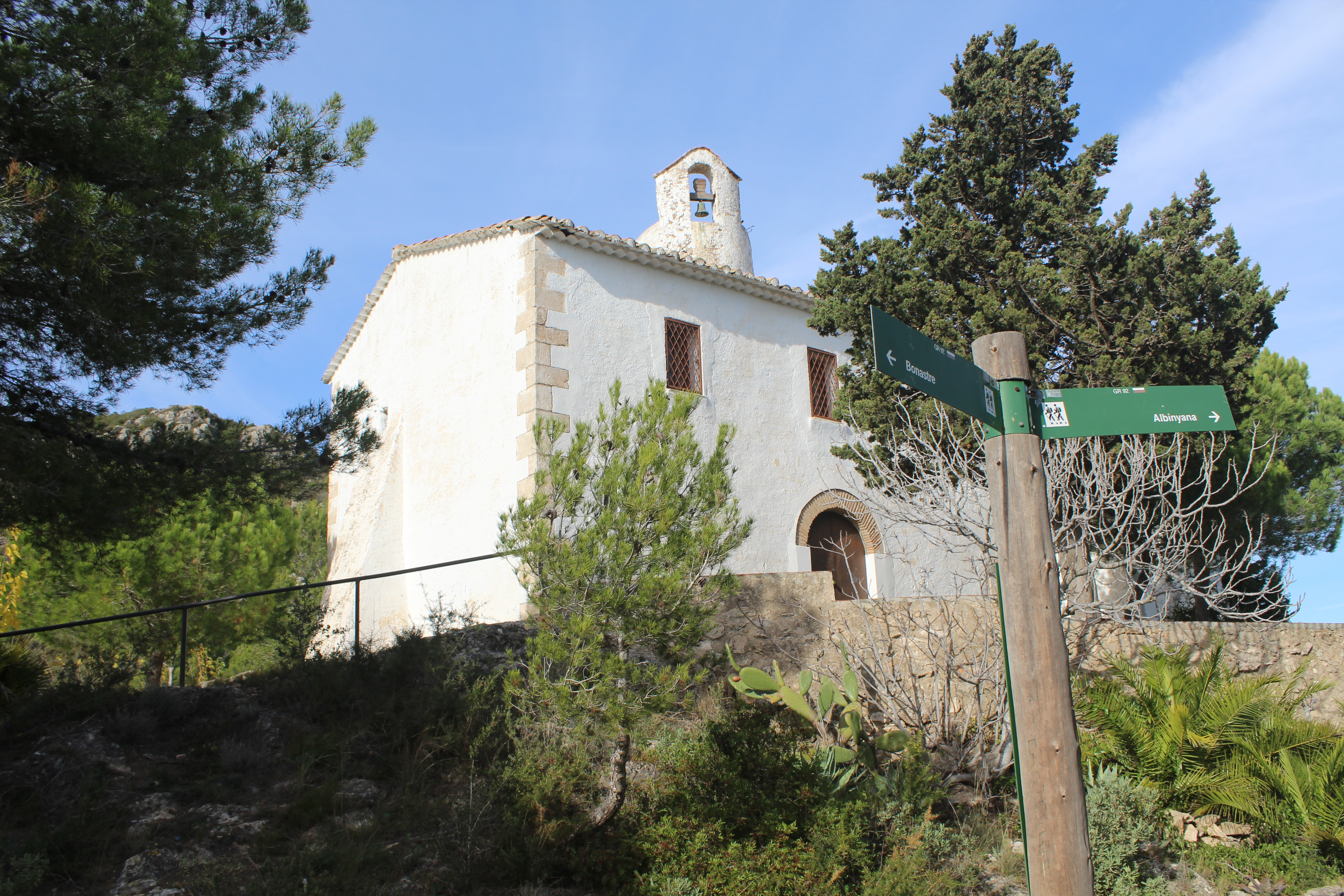
The Saint Anthony (Sant Antoni de Pàdua) Hermitage

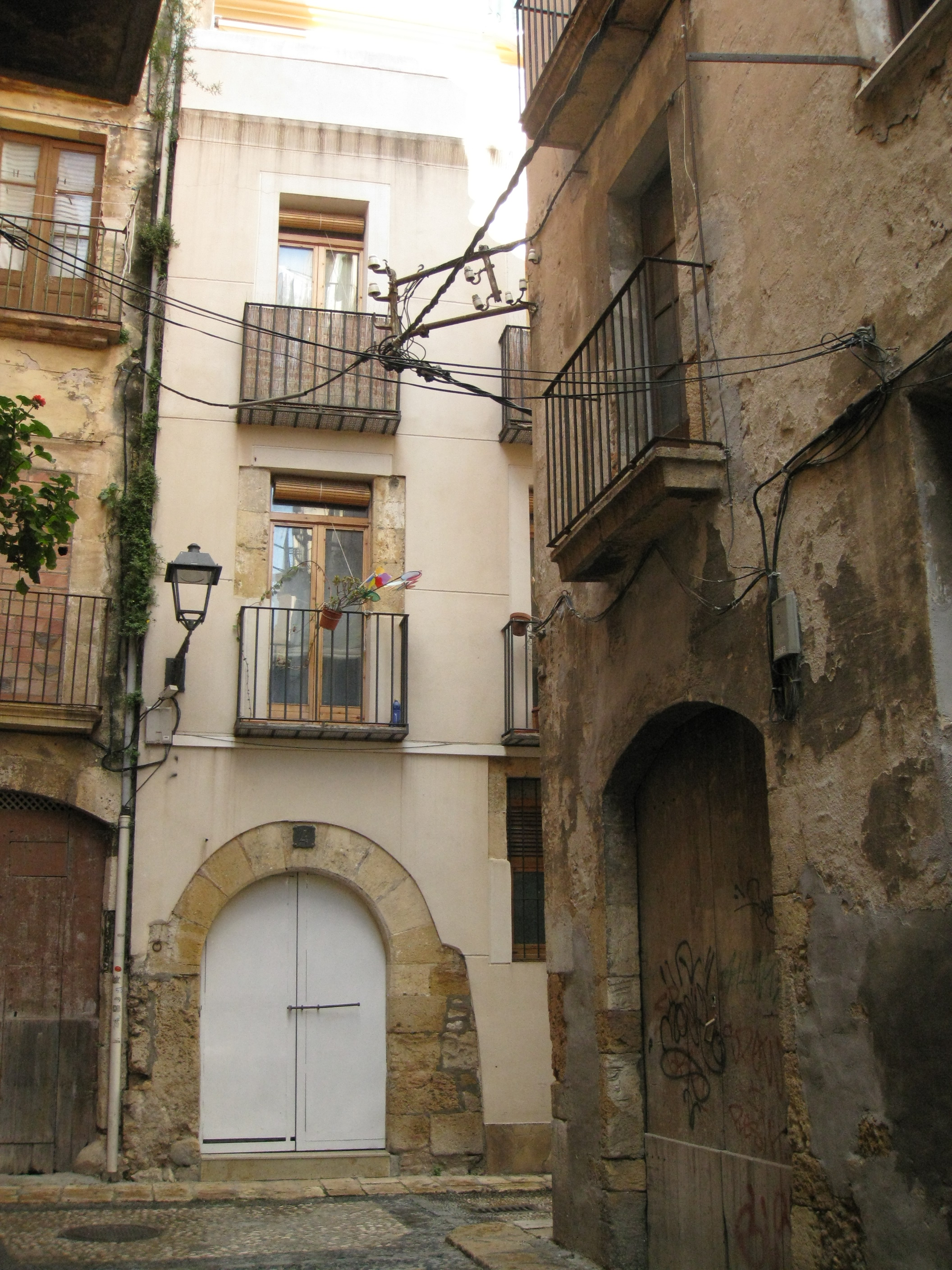
Building on the Notari Albinyana street - Civaderia 4 (Tarragona)

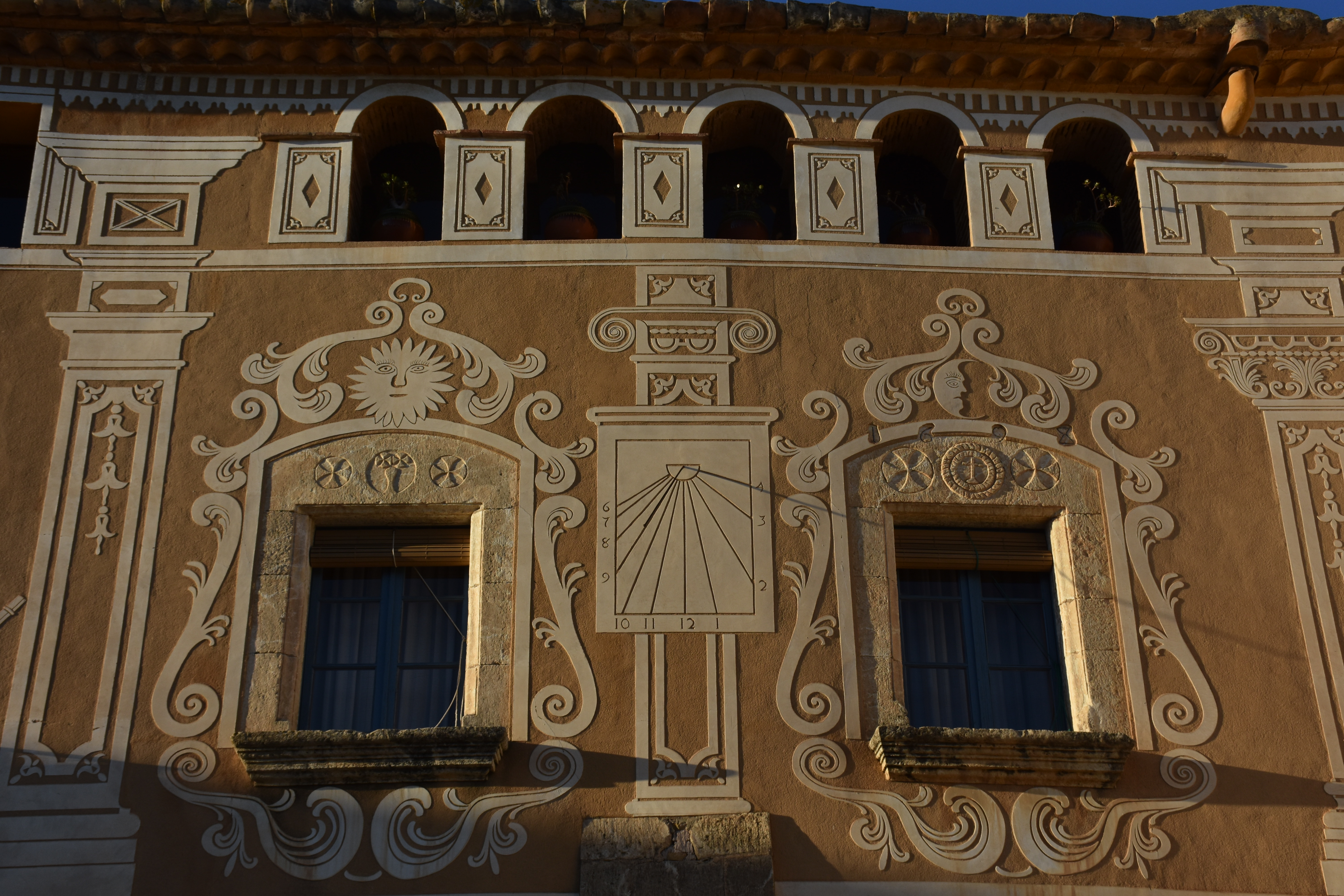
Sundial view of the Cal Gener building, Les Peces (Albinyana)
