= Sant Jaume dels Domenys =

- Municipality
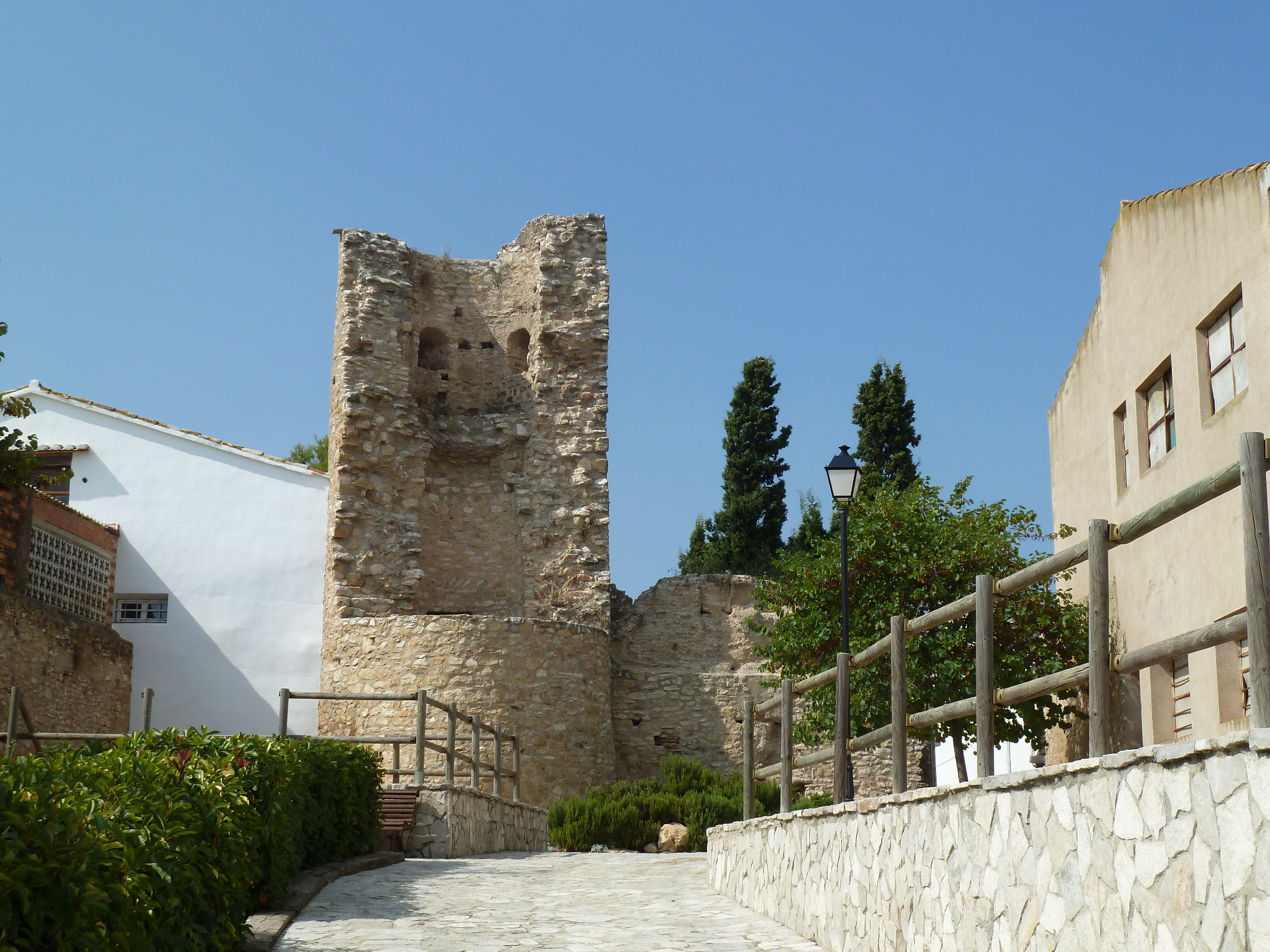
- Torre de Lleger

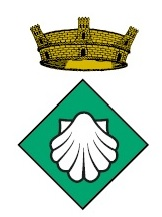
- Flag Coat of arms

- Location in Catalonia
- Coordinates: 41°18′5″N 1°33′37″E
- Country: Spain
- Community: Catalonia
- Province: Tarragona
- Comarca: Baix Penedès

Government
  - Mayor: Marc Palau Morgades (2021)

Area
  - Total: 24.4 km^{2} (9.4 sq mi)

Population (2025-01-01)
  - Total: 2,819
  - Density: 116/km^{2} (299/sq mi)
- Website: www.santjaumedelsdomenys.cat

Sant Jaume dels Domenys (Catalan pronunciation: [ˈsaɲ ˈʒawmə ðəlz ðuˈmɛɲs]) is a village in the province of Tarragona and autonomous community of Catalonia, Spain.

It has a population of 2,819 (register office, 2025).

== Notable residents ==
- Marc Bartra, professional footballer who currently plays for Real Betis.
