= La Bisbal del Penedès =

Municipality in Catalonia, Spain

- Municipality
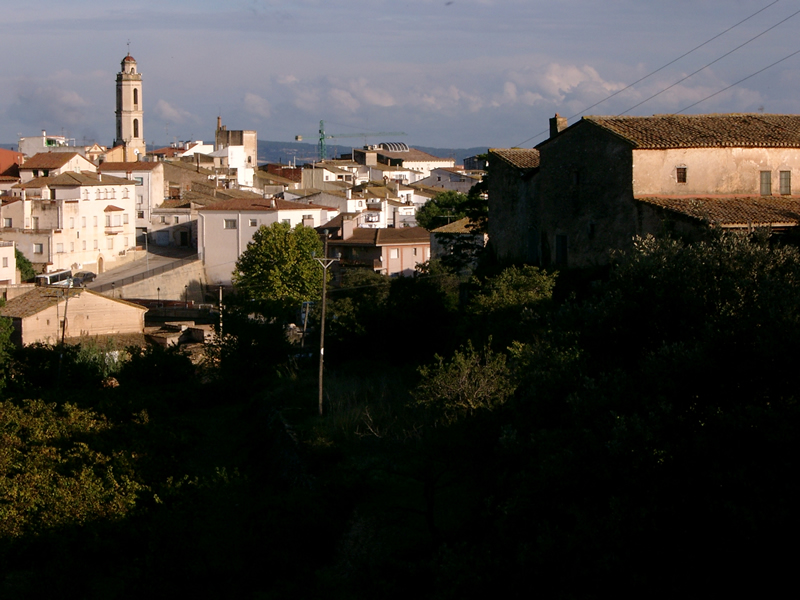
- La Bisbal del Penedès

- Coat of arms

- Location in Catalonia
- Coordinates: 41°16′56″N 1°29′20″E
- Country: Catalonia
- Community: Catalonia
- Province: Tarragona
- Comarca: Baix Penedès

Government
  - Mayor: Agnés Ferré Cañellas (2015)

Area
  - Total: 32.5 km^{2} (12.5 sq mi)
- Elevation: 189 m (620 ft)

Population (2025-01-01)
  - Total: 4,278
  - Density: 132/km^{2} (341/sq mi)
- Climate: Csa
- Website: bisbalpenedes.com

La Bisbal del Penedès (Catalan pronunciation: [lə βizˈbal dəl pənəˈðɛs]) is a village in the province of Tarragona and autonomous community of Catalonia, Spain. It has a population of 4,278 (register office, 2025).
