= Calafell =

- Municipality
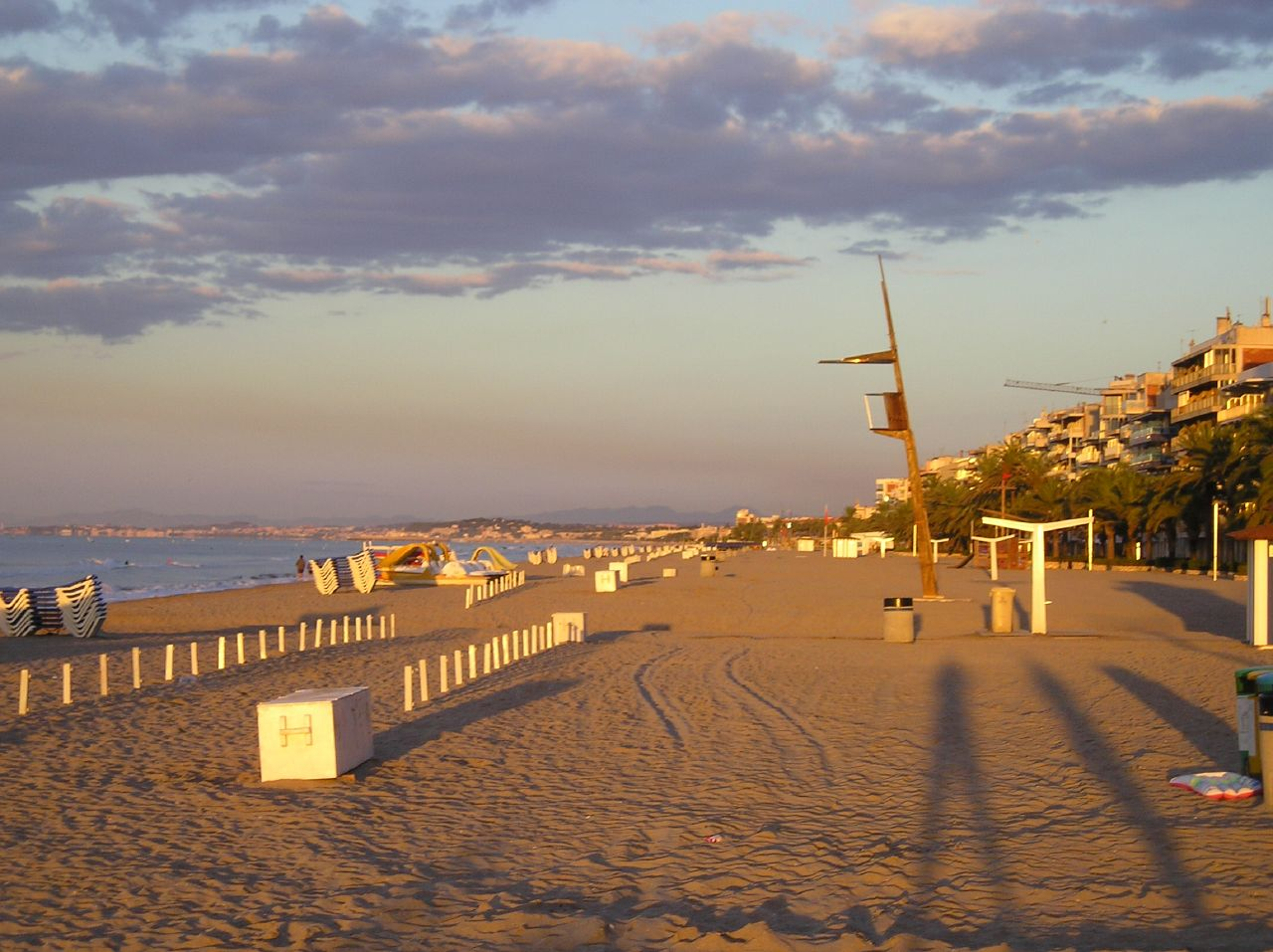
- Calafell beach

- Coat of arms

- Location in Catalonia
- Coordinates: 41.202°N 1.57°E
- Country: Spain
- Community: Catalonia
- Province: Tarragona
- Comarca: Baix Penedès

Government
  - Mayor: Ramon Ferré Solé (2015)

Area
  - Total: 20.4 km^{2} (7.9 sq mi)

Population (2025-01-01)
  - Total: 32,624
  - Density: 1,600/km^{2} (4,140/sq mi)
- Website: calafell.cat

Calafell (Catalan pronunciation: [kələˈfeʎ]) is a village in the province of Tarragona and autonomous community of Catalonia, Spain. It has a population of 32,624 (register office, 2025).

== Tourism ==
The town is located at the heart of the Baix Penedès region; the gateway to the Costa Daurada, its economy depends heavily on tourism. There are also notable historical sites like the Iberian Citadel and the Casa Barral Museum (house that belonged to Carlos Barral).

The GR 92 long distance footpath, which roughly follows the length of the Mediterranean coast of Spain, has a staging point at Calafell. Stage 23 links northwards to Vilanova i la Geltrú, a distance of 13.4 kilometres (8.3 mi), whilst stage 24 links southwards to Torredembarra, a distance of 15.0 kilometres (9.3 mi).
