= El Montmell =

- Municipality
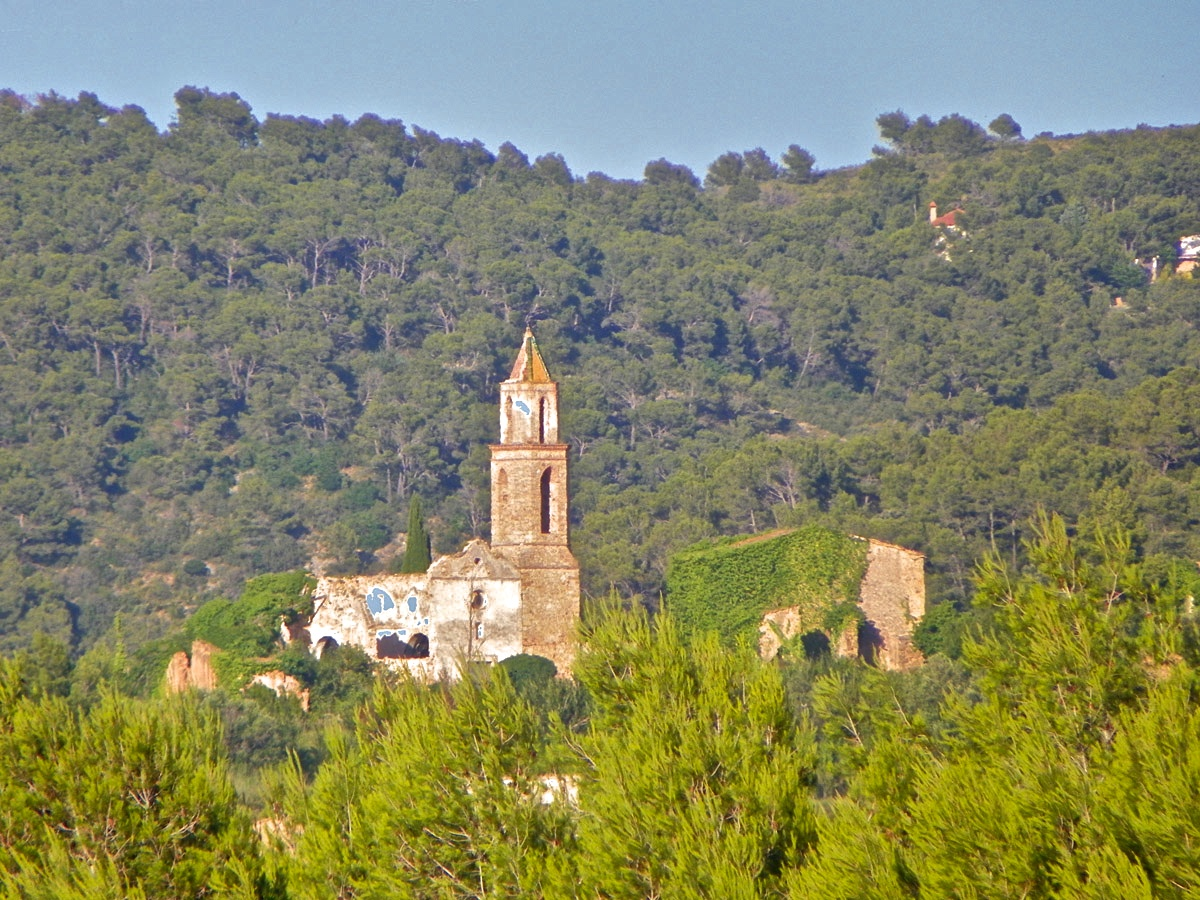
- Marmellar

- Flag Coat of arms

- Location in Catalonia
- Coordinates: 41°19′3″N 1°27′15″E
- Country: Spain
- Community: Catalonia
- Province: Tarragona
- Comarca: Baix Penedès

Government
  - Mayor: Maria Inmaculada Costa Ramón (2015)

Area
  - Total: 72.8 km^{2} (28.1 sq mi)

Population (2024)
  - Total: 1,916
  - Density: 26.3/km^{2} (68.2/sq mi)
- Website: www.elmontmell.cat

El Montmell (Catalan pronunciation: [əl mumˈmeʎ]) is a village in the province of Tarragona and autonomous community of Catalonia, Spain. It has a population of 1,958 (register office, 2025).
