= Baix Penedès =

Coordinates: 41°13′12″N 1°32′4″E

- Comarca
- Country: Spain
- Autonomous community: Catalonia
- Region: Penedès
- Province: Tarragona
- Capital: El Vendrell
- Municipalities: List: Albinyana, L'Arboç, Banyeres del Penedès, Bellvei, La Bisbal del Penedès, Bonastre, Calafell, Cunit, Llorenç del Penedès, Masllorenç, El Montmell, Sant Jaume dels Domenys, Santa Oliva, El Vendrell

Government
  - Body: Baix Penedès Comarcal Council
  - President: Ramon Ferré (PSC)

Area
  - Total: 296.4 km^{2} (114.4 sq mi)

Population (2014)
  - Total: 100,262
  - Density: 338.3/km^{2} (876.1/sq mi)
- Demonym
- Time zone: UTC+1 (CET)
  - Summer (DST): UTC+2 (CEST)
- Largest municipality: El Vendrell
- Website: ccbp.cat

Baix Penedès (Catalan pronunciation: [ˈbaʃ pənəˈðɛs]) is a comarca in the Penedès region, in Catalonia, Spain. The area has been settled since the times of the Iberians, with ancient ruins remaining in Banyeres at Can Canyís, at the village of Guàrdies and in Calafell at the villages of Toixoneres and la Ciutadella ("The Citadel"). The capital is El Vendrell.

== Municipalities ==

Municipality	Population (2014)	Area km^{2}
Albinyana	2,335	19.4
L'Arboç	5,515	14.1
Banyeres del Penedès	3,057	12.2
Bellvei	2,174	8.3
La Bisbal del Penedès	3,495	32.5
Bonastre	622	25.0
Calafell	24,333	20.4
Cunit	11,989	9.7
Llorenç del Penedès	2,306	4.6
Masllorenç	519	6.6
El Montmell	1,418	72.8
Sant Jaume dels Domenys	2,493	24.4
Santa Oliva	3,287	9.6
El Vendrell	36,719	36.8
• Total: 14	100,262	296.4

== Castellers ==
Baix Penedès has one of the longest-lived traditions of castellers in Catalonia. (Castellers practice the traditional Catalan art/sport of making human pyramids.) The comarcal capital, el Vendrell, has a monument dedicated to castellers.

The most important competitions of Castellers in the comarca occur each year as part of the August festival in honor of the Virgin Mary at Bisbal and on the fourth Sunday of August at L'Arboç, with castellers from all over Catalonia.

== People from Baix Penedès ==
Among the most important historical figures from Baix Penedès are:

- Àngel Guimerà (1845–1924): writer. Guimerà was originally from the Canary Islands, but his mother was from el Vendrell, and he eventually settled there in his ancestral home, cal Guimerà.
- Pablo Casals (1876–1973): cellist and composer. The house-museum vila Casals is at Sant Salvador, as is a concert hall, l'Auditori Pau Casals.
- Aureli Maria Escarré (1908–1968): abbot of Montserrat. Since 1978, there has been a monument to him in his home village of l'Arboç, where his ancestral home is on the main street.
- Andreu Nin (1892–1937) dissident Communist revolutionary in the Spanish Civil War)
