= Virgili =

Virgili is a surname. Notable people with the surname include:

- Antoni Rovira i Virgili (1882–1949), Catalan politician
- Antonio Virgili (born 1957), Italian professor
- Albert Virgili (born 1983), Spanish footballer
- Fabio Virgili (born 1986), Italian footballer
- Fernando Virgili (1913–2007), Italian professor and veteran
- Giuseppe Virgili (1935–2016), Italian footballer
- James Virgili (born 1992), Australian soccer player
- Jan Virgili (born 2006), Spanish footballer
- Josep Abril i Virgili (1869–1918), Catalan poet and playwright
- Pedro Virgili (1699–1776), Spanish surgeon
