= Alexander Virgili =

Italian political scientist

Alexander Virgili (Naples) is an Italian political scientist, journalist and expert in international relations and protocol. He is known for his work in disaster risk reduction, international cooperation and major event management. Virgili holds leadership position in civil society organizations such as Secretary General of the Corpo Italiano di San Lazzaro and of the Centro Studi Internazionali and as a member of the Advisory Board of the Lazarus Union.

== Biography ==
Virgili grew up in Naples, Italy, graduating from the University of Naples Federico II in political science and international relations. He later obtained a Master in Space Institutions and Policies at SIOI, in collaboration with the Italian Space Agency, and specializations in ceremonies and protocol.

Virgili served in the National Board of the Corpo Italiano di San Lazzaro since 2016, and President of the UNYA of Italy between 2019 and 2021. Virgili is a member of SGAC project group for Space Тechnology for Disaster Management. In 2021 Virgili co-founded the Naples Hub of the Global Shapers, initiative of the World Economic Forum.

For nearly a decade active in the civil protection field he started his career in the voluntary component of Regione Campania and in the Military Corps of the Italian Red Cross.

Virgili participated at the European Forum for Disaster Risk Reduction 2018 held in Rome on invitation of the United Nations. Virgili opened the plenary session "Every life counts: inclusive and equality based DRR strategies” with a keynote speech. Virgili was also interviewed by UNISDR to share his experience on the field. Virgili participated at the TEDx Marcianise with a speech about perception for disaster risk reduction. Invited by Mami Mizutori, Special Representative of the Secretary-General for Disaster Risk Reduction and Head of UNDRR, Virgili participated as speaker in the virtual high-level panel, broadcast from the UN headquarters in New York, entitled "Leveraging the Power of Science and Technology to Reduce Tsunami Risk for Current and Future Generations" on the occasion of World Tsunami Awareness Day 2021.

From 2016 Virgili organizes in Italy the International Day for Disaster Risk Reduction (GIRD – Giornata Internazionale per la Riduzione dei Disastri) for the Corpo Italiano di San Lazzaro.

Due to his education, Virgili is an expert in disaster management with the support of space technologies.

In 2024 Virgili joined the Organising Committee of the Milano Cortina 2026 Olympic and Paralympic Winter Games working in international relations and protocol, where he became manager at the age of 30.

== Honours ==
=== Dynastic honours ===
- Knight of Merit of the Sacred Military Constantinian Order of Saint George (House of Bourbon-Two Sicilies)
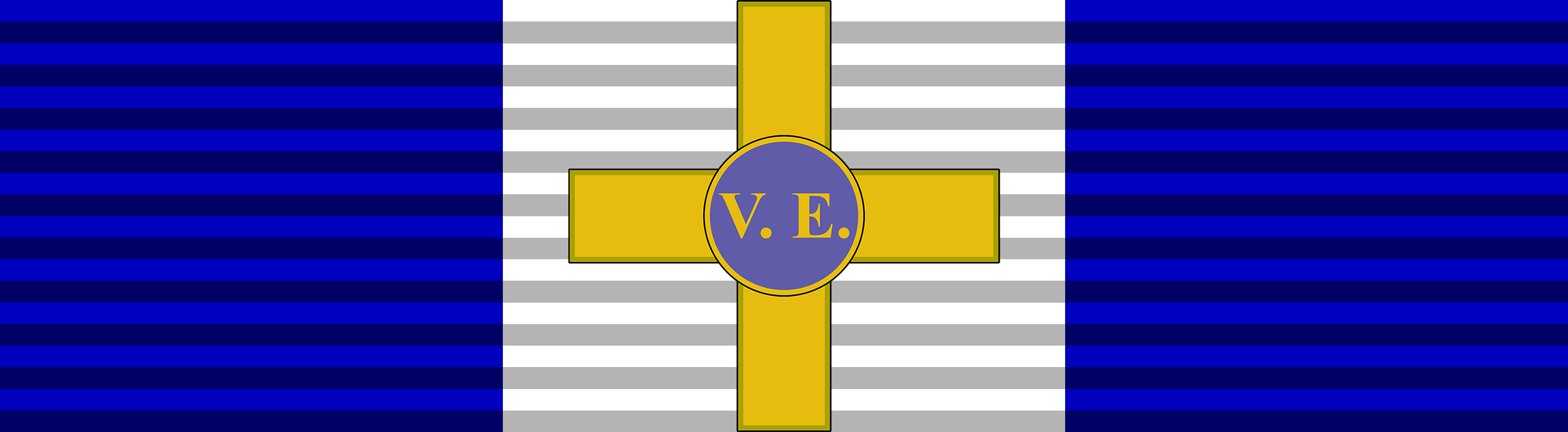
- Officer of the Order of Merit of Savoy (House of Savoy)
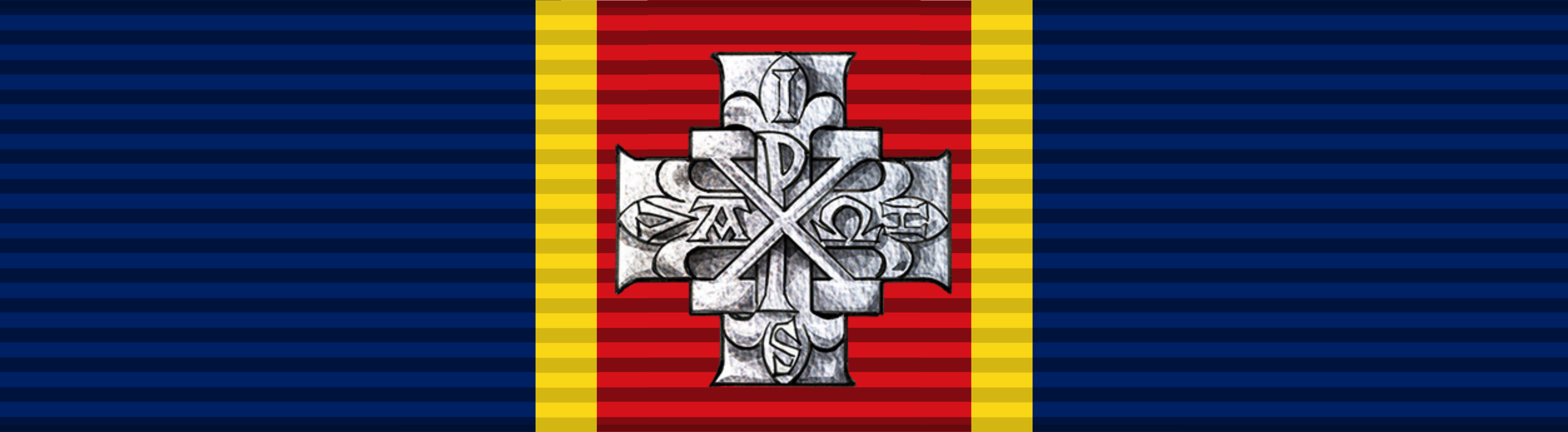
- Gold Medal for the Jubilee of Hope of the Sacred Military Constantinian Order of Saint George (House of Bourbon-Two Sicilies)

=== Honorary title ===
- Kentucky Colonel
- Arkansas Traveler

== Books ==
- La sfida dei disastri in Italia: scenari e prospettive strategiche nazionali, Centro Studi Internazionali, Napoli, 2023. ISBN 978-88-88393-06-4
- Il Golfo di Napoli: disastri e resilienza di una terra affascinante e fragile, Centro Studi Internazionali, Napoli, 2024. ISBN 978-88-88393-08-7
