= Centro Studi Internazionali =

Italian think tank

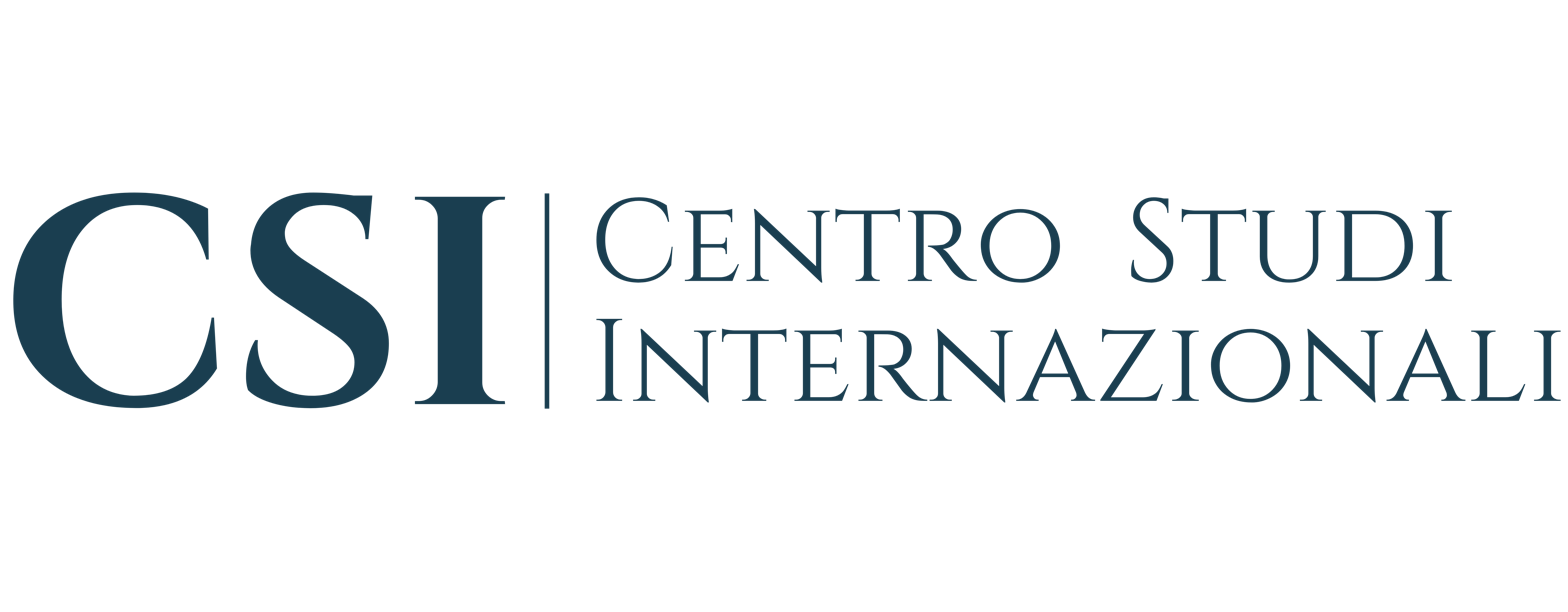
- Abbreviation: CSI
- Formation: 1992; 34 years ago
- Type: Foreign policy think tank
- Legal status: Non-profit Organization
- Headquarters: Naples, Italy
- President: Antonio Virgili
- Director: Francesco Gaudiosi
- Deputy Director: Emanuele Errichiello
- Deputy Director: Federico Cortese
- Website: studi-internazionali.org

Centro Studi Internazionali (CSI) is a think tank based in Naples, Italy. It conducts policy studies and strategic analyses of global political, economic and security issues, with a specific focus on international relations, defence, trade, energy and geostrategy. It is considered one of the leading research centers in international affairs in Italy and is the most prominent research center in Southern Italy.

== History ==
The CSI was founded in Naples, Italy, in 1992, and soon became the main think tank focused on international relations in Naples, together with the Neapolitan branch of SIOI (active until its closure in 2020). During its first year, it initiated contacts with the Eurostat for the creation of an international documentation center in Naples, in particular for OSCE documents on international trade developments. Also it launched its magazine Studi Internazionali, which is published online.

The early years of the CSI were characterized by intense conference and seminar activities in Naples and Rome, especially with diplomatic representatives. Various events on human rights were held in collaboration with institutions such as the Italian League of Human Rights, the Italian Institute of Social Sciences, the Italian Institute of Philosophical Studies and Amnesty International. Between 1999 and 2006, the CSI produced several publications and books on historical, demographic and social science topics.

In 2003, President Antonio Virgili conferred the Prize of the Centro Studi Internazionali in Rome to the Dalai Lama Tenzin Gyatso, former Nobel Peace Prize winner, for his contribution to the ideals of peaceful international coexistence.

The CSI has traditionally focused upon young generations. For example, especially between 2004 and 2016, it undertook numerous activities to introduce students to the study of International relations. Because of its work, the CSI was included in January 2006 in the Italian National Research Registry of the Ministry of Education.

In 2016, the Center joined the Academic Impact international network of the United Nations, a research initiative that brings together universities and institutions to promote the protection and research on human rights. In the same year, a partnership was signed with the Lazarus Union and the Corpo Italiano di San Lazzaro to carry out the "GirlUp" project of the United Nations Foundation within schools.

Between 2019 and 2020, the CSI was renewed with a young management by PhD students, young professionals and researchers by focusing on research activities, analysis and communication. In a short time, the CSI regained its usual vitality, demonstrated also by the numerous activities and partnerships. Activities in recent years include hearings with the Italian Presidency of the Council of Ministers and participation in, among others, the Krynica Economic Forum and in the European Congress of Local Governments, in which the CSI is among the institutional partners. During this period, a new scientific journal was also introduced: CSI Review.

== Activities ==
The Center carries out analysis, consultancy and research activities on issues related to geopolitics, international relations, defense and economics. The research activities of the CSI are divided into three areas: European Union, Italian foreign policy, and Elections Hub.

The CSI regularly holds meetings, conferences, and seminars on topics related to geopolitics, defense, and economics, featuring experts and institutional representatives from both national and international contexts.

== Publications ==
The Centro Studi Internazionali publishes two journals. Studi Internazionali, has been published continuously since December 1992 and covers topics related to foreign policy, defence, and international relations with an institutional and analytical approach. CSI Review, which was launched in 2020, is a scientific journal which publshed lengthier contributions that have a more academic orientation which are aimed at scholars, analysts, and sector professionals.

In addition to its journals, the Centre acts as a publisher for more than ten collective and monographic volumes from 1999 to the present, focusing on geopolitical, historical, social, strategic, and economic issues.
