= Alfredo Arpaia =

Italian politician (1930–2019)

Alfredo Arpaia (14 August 1930 – 6 January 2019) was an Italian politician who served as a Member of Parliament between 1982 and 1983.

Arpaia served as President of the Italian League for Human Rights from 2002 to 2016 and from 2017 as member of the board of the Corpo Italiano di San Lazzaro.

== Biography ==
Graduated in medicine and surgery. Candidate for the Italian Republican Party in the 1979 general election, but was not elected. He then became a member of parliament in August 1982, taking over from Francesco Compagna, who had died. In October of the same year, he left the Italian Republican Party (PRI) to join the mixed group; he remained in office until the end of the eighth legislature in the summer of 1983.

From 2002, succeeding Pasquale Bandiera, and until 2016, he was National President of the Italian League for Human Rights, before being appointed Special Commissioner in 2018 following Antonio Stango's resignation from the presidency of the League.

Since 2017, he had also held the position of National Councilor of the Corpo Italiano di San Lazzaro.

He died on January 6, 2019, at the age of 88.
