= Stockerau Airfield =

Stockerau Airfield Flugplatz Stockerau
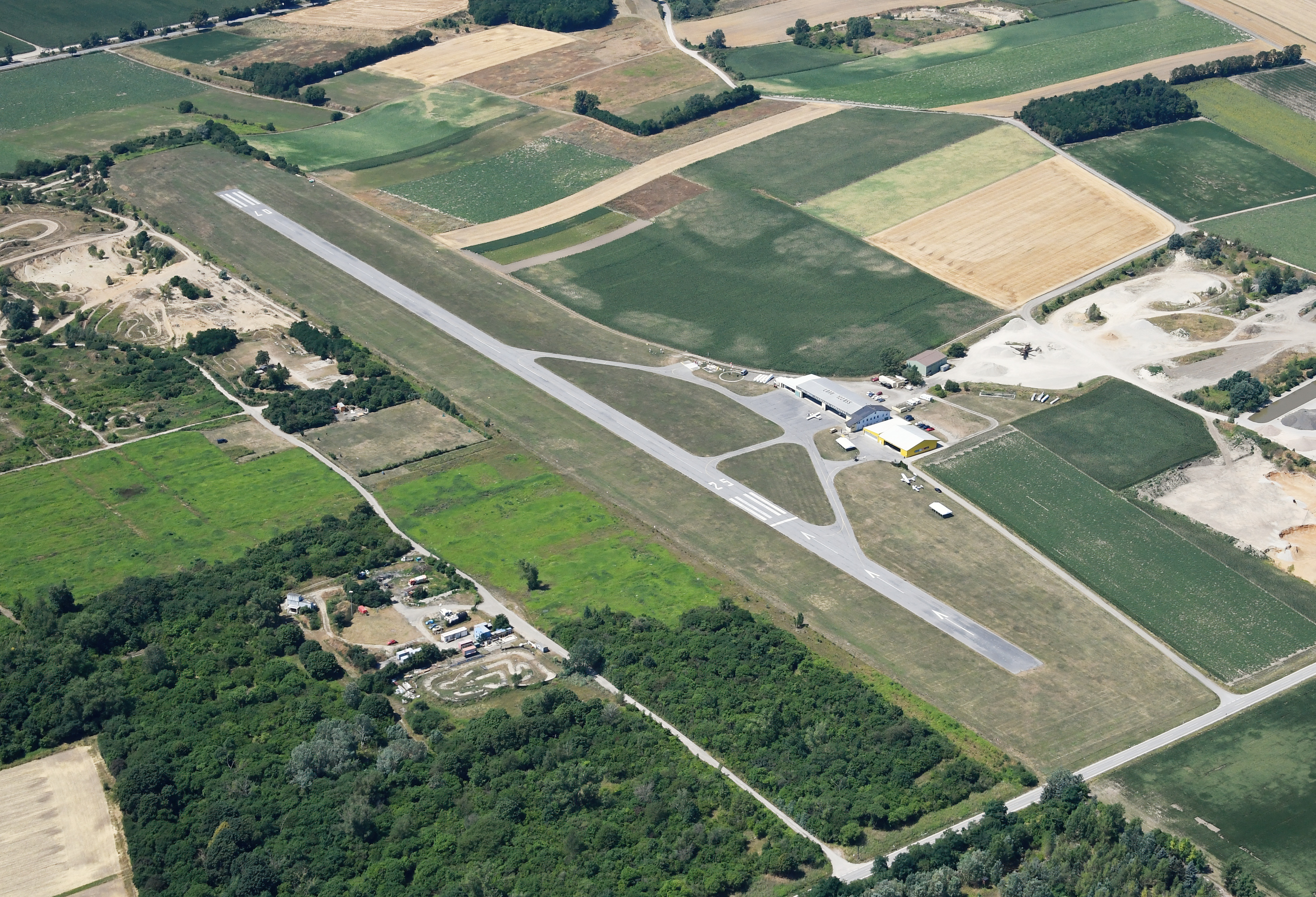
- IATA: none; ICAO: LOAU

Summary
- Airport type: Private
- Serves: Stockerau
- Location: Austria
- Elevation AMSL: 692 ft / 211 m
- Coordinates: 48°24′32.8″N 016°11′28.1″E

Map
- Location of Stockerau Airfield in Austria

Runways
Direction	Length		Surface
Direction	ft	m	Surface
07/25	2,610	796	Asphalt

Stockerau Airfield (German: Flugplatz Stockerau, ICAO: LOAU) is a private use aerodrome located 3 kilometres (2 mi) northwest of Stockerau, Lower Austria, Austria.

The airport is the base of the annual CSLI Air Day for the handicapped.

== See also ==
- List of airports in Austria
