= Jardín Botánico de San Fernando =

Botanical garden in Spain

Coordinates: 36°28′0″N 6°12′0″W

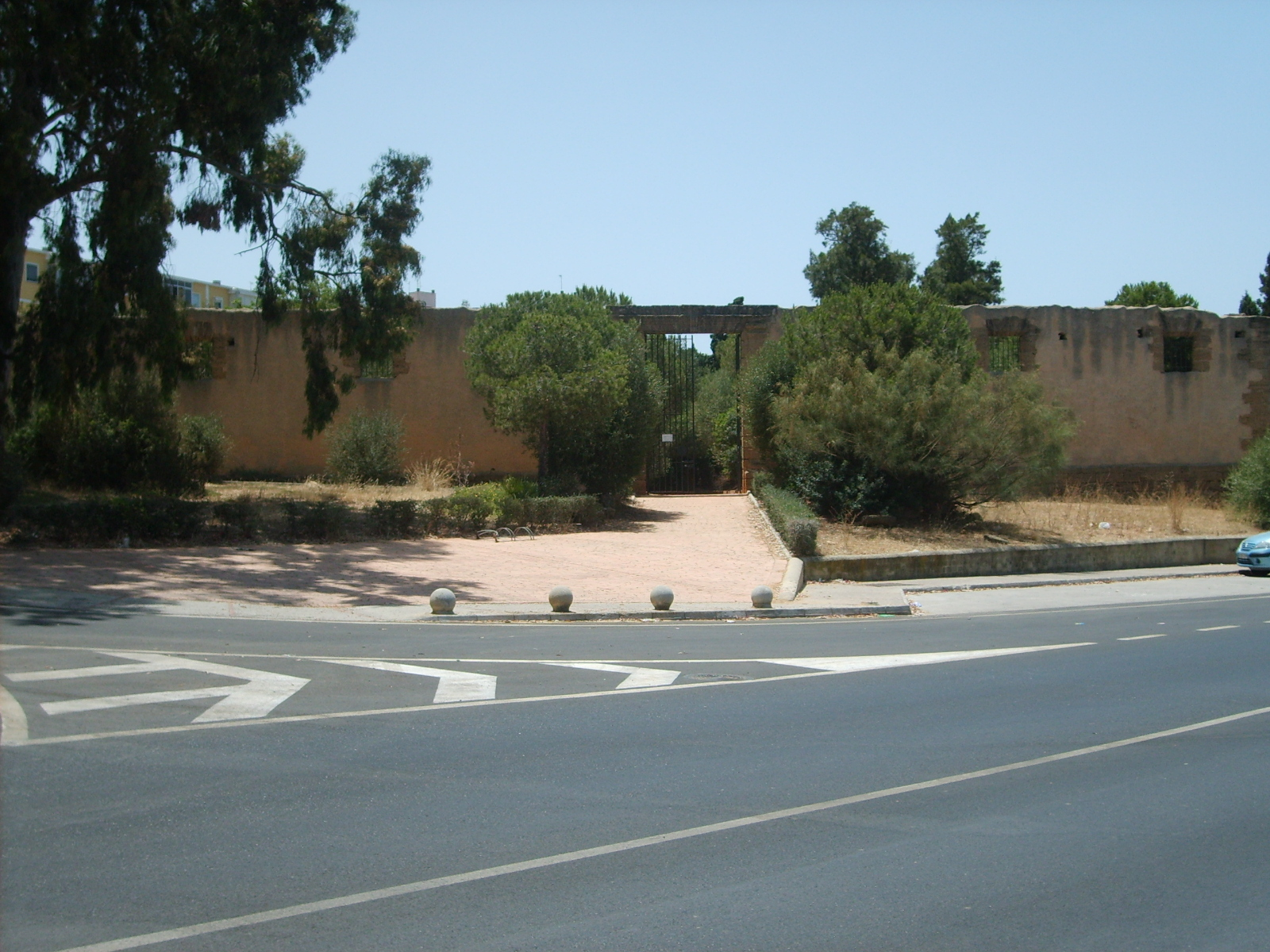

Jardín Botánico de San Fernando is a botanical garden located next to the Parque Natural de la Bahía de Cádiz in San Fernando in the Province of Cádiz, Andalusia, Spain. Established in 2001, it covers an area of about 9 acres.

== See also ==
- List of botanical gardens in Andalusia
