= Wolfgang Steinhardt =

Austrian entrepreneur (1948–2024)

Senator h. c. Wolfgang Steinhardt

President of the Lazarus Union
- In office 2009–2019
- Succeeded by: Lothar Gellert

Personal details
- Profession: businessman, philanthropist
- Awards: Decoration of Honour for Services to the Republic of Austria

Wolfgang Steinhardt (Vienna 26 July, 1948 - 7 March 2024) is an Austrian businessman and philanthropist.

== Life ==
Wolfgang Steinhardt was a private entrepreneur, founding several of his own companies and working as a flight instructor for helicopters and airplanes. From 2000 to 2005 he worked in the Chamber of Commerce of the Dominican Republic. After returning to Austria, he worked until 2008 as a professional helicopter pilot and flight instructor.

== Charity work ==
After retirement, he founded the international non-governmental organization Lazarus Union (Corps Saint Lazarus International, CSLI), which he chaired from 2006 to 2019. Under his leadership, the organization achieved special consultative status with the United Nations Economic and Social Council and was nominated for the Nobel Peace Prize. In addition to natural disaster operations, he also conducted sightseeing flights with disabled children and adults.

== Honors and decorations ==
On February 21, 2014, he was awarded the Decoration of Honour for Services to the Republic of Austria by President Heinz Fischer. He received the award on June 10, 2014 from prof. Harry Kopietz at Vienna City Hall.

On May 15, 2016, a member of the UNAI Academia São Lázaro de Estudos Cavalheirescos e Humanitários in Rio de Janeiro awarded him the honorary title of Prof. h. c.

On March 14, 2017, he received from the Lower Austrian Provincial Governor Dr. Erwin Pröll Silver Medal of Merit.

He is an honorary member of a number of organizations and has received more than two hundred awards and distinctions from public and private institutions, companies and private associations.
