= Josep Masgoret i Marcó =

19th-century Spanish warlord

- Born: 1820; Miramar (Alt Camp)
- Died: 1883 (aged 62–63); France
- Military career
- Allegiance: Carlists
- Commands: Tarragona
- Conflicts: Second Carlist War

Josep Masgoret i Marcó (Miramar, Alt Camp, Catalonia, c. 1820–France, 1883) was one of the most prominent Carlist warlords of Catalonia during the Second Carlist War.

Although he was one of the most wealthy landowners of Tarragona, he decided to abandon his family, and in 1838, he was appointed commander of Tarragona along with Maties de Vall and Lo Llarg de Copons. He participated in the so-called Seven Years' War, which earned him considerable reputation. After the war, he was promoted to brigadier general. He went into exile for some time afterwards, but later returned to fight in the so-called War of the Early-Risers (1846–49), on 1 April 1848, as field marshal of the Carlist forces. He organized a so-called Council of Catalonia in order to solve local administrative economic, civil and military issues. In the beginning of 1849, seeing the impossibility of winning the war, he went again into exile in France, where he died in 1883.

== Bibliography ==
- La guerra dels Matiners a Catalunya (1846–1849). Robert Vallverdú i Martí Publicacions de l'Abadia de Montserrat 2002 page 402
- Diccionario histórico del carlismo. Josep Carles Clemente. Pamiela 2006. page 328
