= Corpo Italiano di San Lazzaro =

Italian national Lazarus Union branch

Italian Corps of the Lazarus Union Corpo Italiano di San Lazzaro
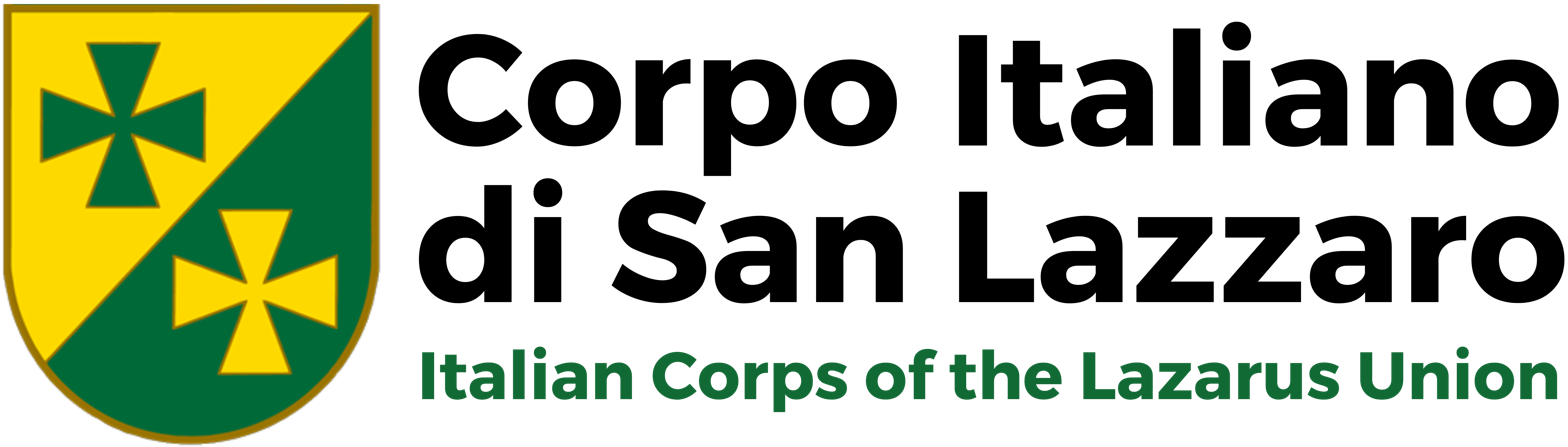
- Formation: 1 March 2009
- Legal status: Association
- Headquarters: Naples, Italy
- Region served: Italy
- President: Antonio Virgili
- Vice President: Salvatore Marinelli
- Secretary General: Alexander Virgili
- Affiliations: Lazarus Union
- Website: www.csli-italia.org

The Corpo Italiano di San Lazzaro (CSLI Italia, English: Italian Corps of the Lazarus Union) is the Italian national Lazarus Union branch that has its origin in Naples on 1 March 2009.

== Activities ==
The Corpo Italiano di San Lazzaro main tasks are social activities, civil protection, youth engagement and psychological support.

Currently the association is mainly active in Naples, Pozzuoli, Livorno and Rome.

=== International Day for Disaster Risk Reduction ===
The Day, instituted with the resolution 64/200 of the General Assembly of the United Nations on 21 December 2009, falls on 13 October of each year. The Corps, promoting a culture of prevention linked to civil protection activities, since 2016 organizes the GIRD – Giornata Internazionale per la Riduzione dei Disastri in Italy every year in collaboration with UNISDR. Usually the IDDR consists of conferences, workshops and round tables with representatives of the Institutions, experts in the sector and active citizenship. For the realization of the GIRD the Corps avails itself of the collaboration of various national bodies such as INGV, ENEA, ISPRA and local authorities.

== Emblem ==
The shield of the Corps Saint Lazarus International (CSLI) is present in all the international and national symbols of the Lazarus Union. It identifies the holder as a Member or Volunteer of the national and international organization. The heraldic shield, of the Sannita type, marks those who perform active service in the Association. The green color, like the octagonal crosses, is a reference to the Order of Saint Lazarus, to its values and to the chivalrous tradition it represents. Gold is a symbol of the spiritual virtues of charity (one of the four principles of Lazarus Union) and of justice and the worldly qualities of happiness and nobility. Above the shield is written the word "CSLI" to indicate the acronym "Corps Saint Lazarus International".
