= Jardín Botánico (Cádiz) =

Coordinates: 36.5347°N 6.3036°W

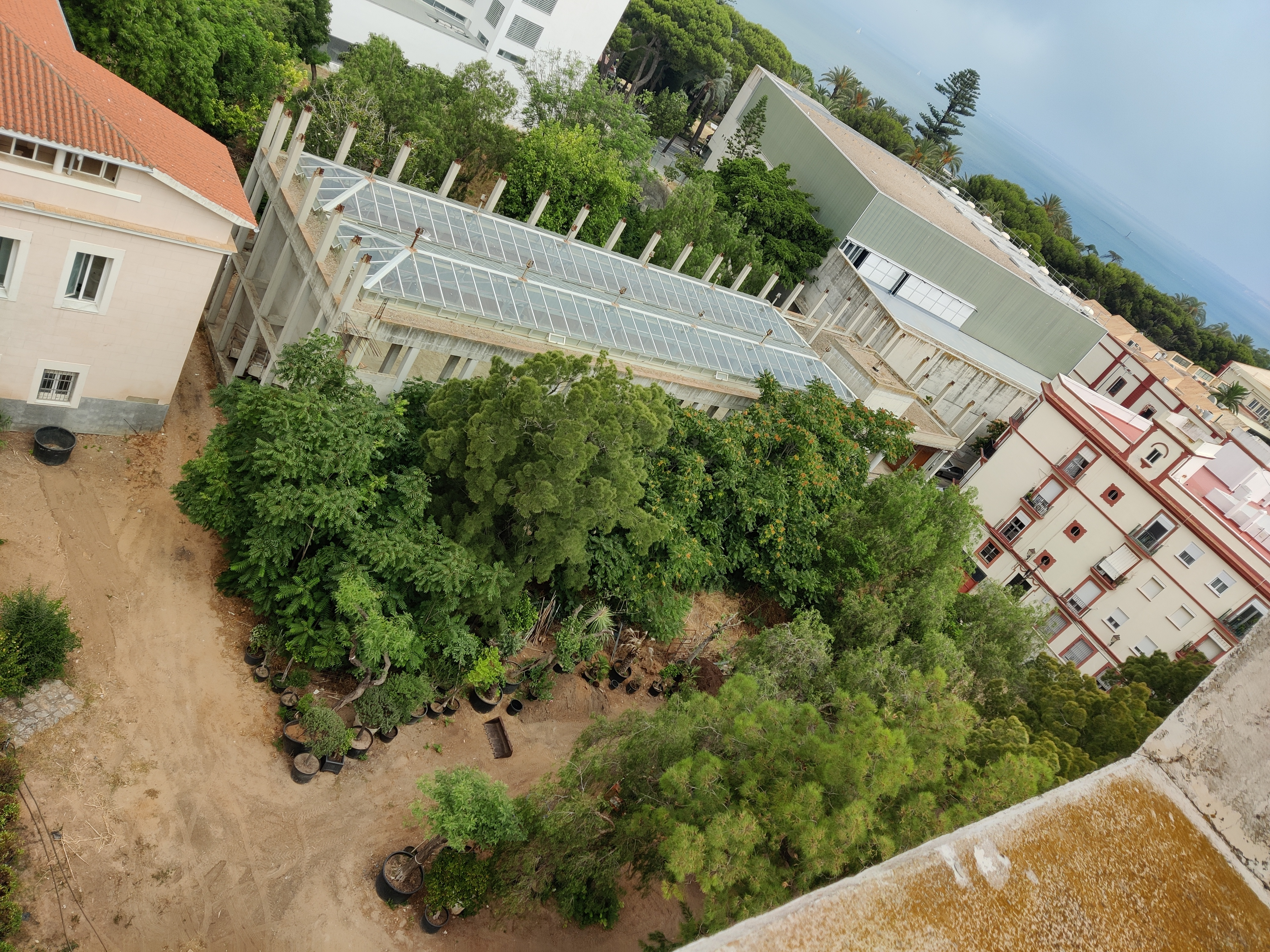
Jardín Botánico de Cádiz

The Jardín Botánico de Cádiz was an eighteenth-century example of a botanical garden for the study of medicine located in Cádiz, Spain. It was founded by Pedro Virgili, director of the Royal College of Surgeons of the Navy (now part of the University of Cádiz).

Virgili set about acquiring the site for the garden on April 22, 1749, shortly after the foundation of the Royal College. The plants were grouped according to their medicinal use in order to help the students apply their knowledge of botany in a medical context. José Celestino Mutis, who was one of the first students at the college, went on to become a famous botanist. Botanical gardens are named after him in Colombia and Spain.

== See also ==
- Physic garden
- List of botanical gardens in Andalusia
