= Llarg de Copons =

Blessed Manuel Ibáñez Ubach
- Born: 1800
- Died: 1839 (aged 38–39)

Llarg de Copons was one of the main warlords of the Carlists of Catalonia in the Second Carlist War (1846–49).

In 1838, he was appointed commander of Tarragona with Vall and Josep Masgoret i Marcó. Shortly afterwards he led the Carlists in the Battle of Vilallonga del Camp, during which 138 were killed.
