= Josep Mestres i Miquel =

Spanish doctor, politician, and agronomist

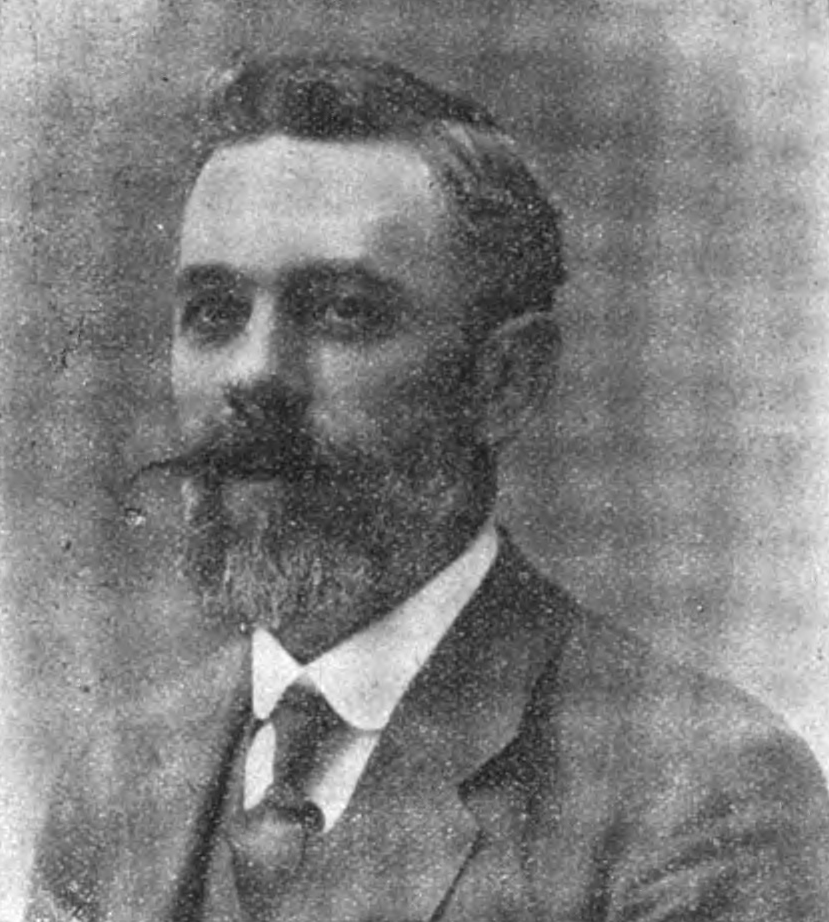
Josep Mestres Miquel

Josep Mestres i Miquel (1868 - 1949) was a Spanish medical doctor, politician, and agronomist. Born in Vilallonga del Camp, he was president of Tarragona Province from (1913-1915) under the Unión Federal Nacionalista Republicana (UFNR) and was part of the first Executive Council of the Commonwealth of Catalonia. He also served as president of the Association of Physicians of the Province of Tarragona and president of the Official College of Physicians of the province of Tarragona.
