= List of botanical gardens in Andalusia =

A list of notable botanical gardens in Andalusia, Spain.

- Alameda del Tajo
- Jardín Botánico del Albardinal
- Jardín Botánico El Aljibe
- Arboreto Carambolo
- Jardín Botánico El Ángel
- Arboretum La Alfaguara
- Jardín Botánico El Castillejo
- Jardín Botánico La Concepción
- Jardín histórico la Cónsula
- Jardín Botánico de la Cortijuela
- Jardín Botánico de Córdoba
- Jardín Botánico Dunas del Odiel
- Jardín Botánico de la Universidad de Granada
- Jardín Botánico el Hornico
- Jardín Botánico Universitario de Sierra Nevada
- Jardín Botánico Hoya de Pedraza
- Jardines de la Finca San José
- Jardín Botánico (Cádiz)
- Jardín Botánico de Sanlúcar
- Zoobotánico Jerez
- Jardín Botánico Molino de Inca
- Jardín Botánico Mora i Bravard
- Jardín Botánico de la Universidad de Málaga
- Parque botánico José Celestino Mutis
- Parque de Málaga
- Jardín histórico el Retiro
- Jardín Botánico El Robledo
- Jardín Botánico de San Fernando
- Jardín Botánico de Sierras Tejeda, Alhama y Almijara
- Jardín Botánico Torre del Vinagre
- Jardín Botánico de la Umbría de la Virgen
- Arboreto El Villar
