= Antonio Virgili =

Italian psychologist and professor

- Born: 1957; Naples
- Citizenship: Italy
- Education: University of Naples Federico II
- Scientific career
- Fields: sociology, psychology, sexuology, social science, clinical reflexology
- Workplaces: University of Naples Federico II; Centro Studi Internazionali; Istituto Superiore di Sociologia; Universita' Internazionale UNISED; University of Human Sciences and Technology of Lugano

Antonio Virgili (born 1957 in Naples) is an Italian social sciences and integrative medicine professor, researcher, and consultant. He is the scientific director of the Italian Institute of Social Sciences, president of the Centro Studi Internazionali, In 2019, he was appointed by the High Council of the Judiciary and the Ministry of Justice as an Honorary Judge at Youth Courts. He has authored numerous articles, essays, and books, and is a scholar of esotericism and heraldic and symbology studies. He is also the second duke of Castelvenere. He inherited the title from his father: Fernando Virgili the first duke of Castelvenere.

== Life ==
Virgili was born in Naples in 1957.

== Career ==
After a period of field research in 1983, Virgili obtained a position as a professor of social psychology and methodology of social research at the Higher Institute of Sociology. He was a collaborator at the University of Naples Federico II, and also chairman for medical anthropology of the International Council of Integrative Medicine in Australia. He was among the founding members of the Asian Population Association and the Victimology Support International Observatory and Network-VISION as the coordinator of the department for "Stress, post-traumatic stress and DAS".

He is currently the scientific director of the Italian Institute of Social Sciences (Istituto Superiore di Sociologia) and the Center of International Studies (Centro Studi Internazionali); Professor of neuro-social sexuology at UNISED, and professor at the university centre University of Human Sciences and Technolology of Lugano, which was established in 1999. He is also a psychologist, a researcher and consultant in social sciences, neurosciences and clinical reflexology.

Virgili has authored over fifty essays and scientific articles and has worked with various newspapers. He has lectured at dozens of conferences for disseminating science and collaborated with Rotary International, Lions Club International and Kiwanis.

He is a member of The Society of the Friends of St. George's, the Istituto Italiano per l´Africa e l´Oriente; the Society for Geographical Studies, the New York Academy of Sciences, the American Psychosomatic Society, the Italian Society of Economics Demography and Statistics, the European Sociological Association and the Society for the Scientific Study of Sexuality. He is the chairman of the Culture Commission at LIDU (Italian League for Human Rights).

As an artist he has exhibited his photos in cities like New York, Paris, Malta, and Tokyo.

== Honors and awards ==
=== Dynastic honours ===
- Knight Grand Cross of the Order of the Eagle of Georgia (Bagrationi dynasty)
- Commander of the Order of Saint Michael of the Wing (House of Braganza)
- Commander of the Order of the Iron Crown
- Knight of Merit of the Sacred Military Constantinian Order of Saint George (House of Bourbon-Two Sicilies)
- Bronze Medal of Merit of the Sacred Military Constantinian Order of Saint George (House of Bourbon-Two Sicilies)
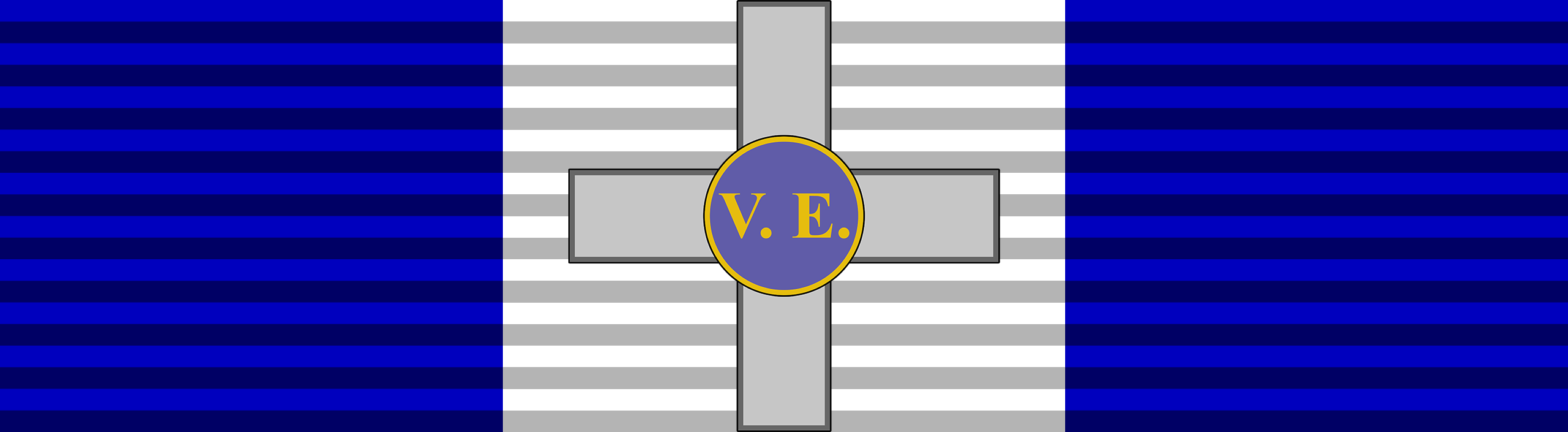
- Knight of the Order of Merit of Savoy (House of Savoy)

=== Honorary title ===
- Kentucky Colonel
- Arkansas Traveler

== Books ==
- Modernizzazione e transizione demografica, ISS, Naples, 1982
- Il personale delle Unità Sanitarie Locali in Campania (co-autore), CNITE, Rome, 1984
- La contraccezione nelle adolescenti" (co-autore con F. ferraro), Ricerca Medica Ed., 1984
- Trasformazioni urbane e domanda di integrazione spaziale: il caso della 167 di Secondigliano (co-autore), LAN/FORMEZ, Naples, 1985
- La mia vita è fedele a Viltrum, Ed. Accad. Pontzen, Naples, 1996
- L´Øresund: regione transfrontaliera della nuova Europa, Mem. Geografiche, Univ. Firenze, 1996
- Itinerari di scienze sociali Mugnano di Napoli e la mia vita, Ed. CSI, Naples, 1999
- Storia dell'Ordine militare e ospedaliere di San Giovanni d'Acri e San Tommaso, Ediz. Anselmi, Naples, 1999
- New perspectives in teaching activity: artificial environments and new technologies, Working Papers, Arion, 2001
- La rivoluzione silenziosa, Ed. CSI/Anselmi, Naples, 2002. ISBN 88-88393-005
- La bottega dei saperi: percorsi tra storia e geografia (co-autore), Ediz. IRRE, Naples, 2002
- Il fantasma del localismo, Ummarino Editore, Naples, 2003
- Aspetti dell'eredità bizantina, Ed. OSS/CSI, Naples 2003
- La formazione a distanza, Ed. CERGE, Naples 2004
- La tradizione napoleonica, Ed. CSI, Naples, 2005. ISBN 88-88393-013
- Lessons of Clinical Reflexology, RS Ed., (I ed.), 2007
- Culti misterici ed orientali a Pompei, Gangemi, Rome, 2008. ISBN 978-88-492-1409-3
- Prevenzione, benessere e medicina integrativa, (Dispense corso seminariale), Ediz. El., 2010
- Nuove frontiere della ricerca psico-socio-sanitaria, (Dispense corso seminariale) Ediz. El., 2011
- Benessere e prevenzione: l'apporto delle neuroscienze, (Dispense corso seminariale) Ediz. El., 2012
- Stress e sistemi corporei nell'approccio pnei, CSI, Naples, 2013
- Diffusione e sintomatologia dei disturbi da stress post-traumatico, Aggiornamenti di studio, 2013
- Dalle relazioni mente corpo alle relazioni interpersonali, (Dispense corso seminariale) Ediz. El, 2014
- Neurosociologia e neuroscienze applicate, CSI, Naples, 2014
