= Vilallonga del Camp =

- Municipality
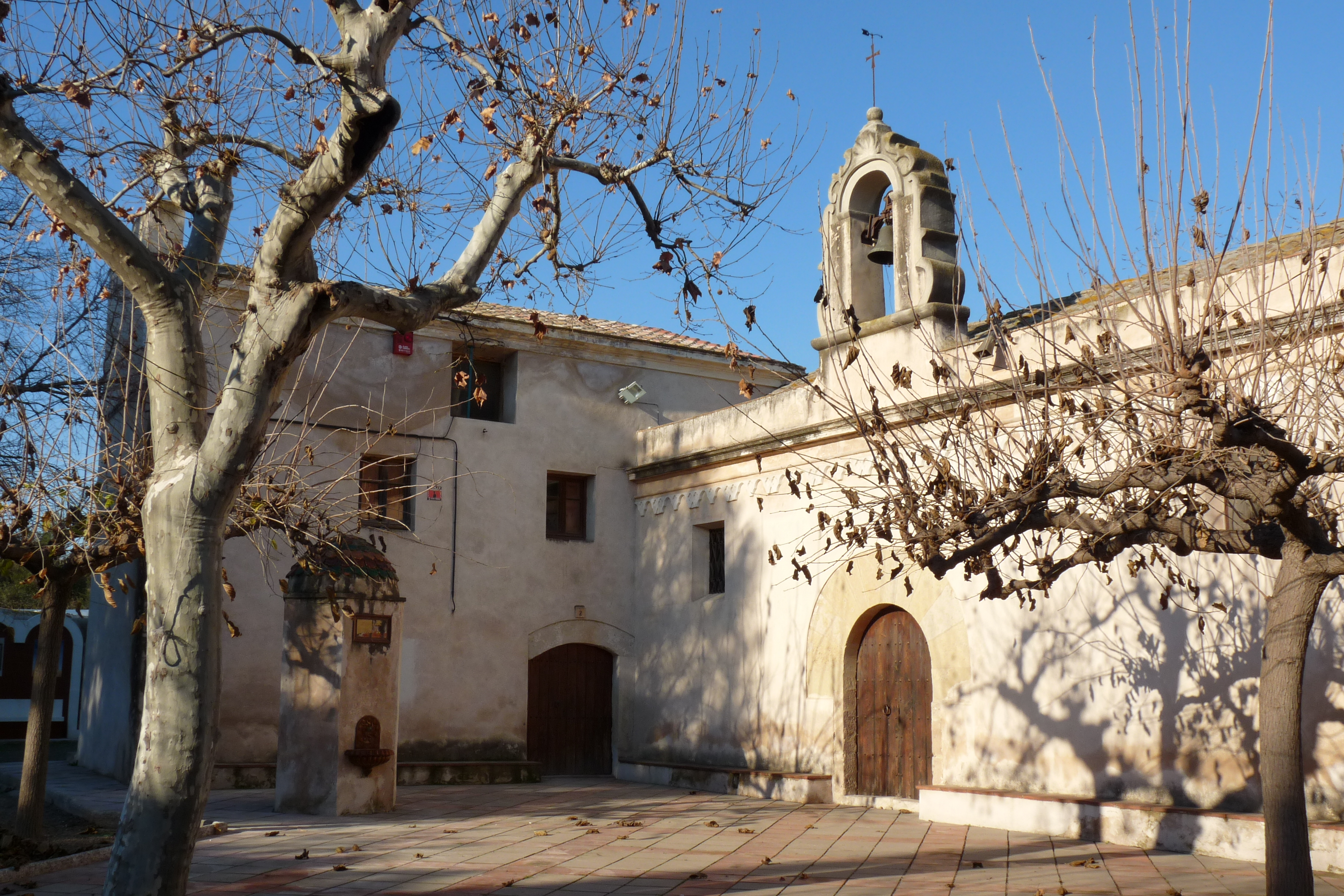

- Municipal location in Tarragonès

- Location in Catalonia
- Coordinates: 41.208°N 1.207°E
- Country: Spain
- Region: Catalonia
- Province: Tarragona
- County: Tarragonés

Government
  - Type: Mayor–council
  - Mayor: Ignasi Valera Cabré (2015) (ERC)

Area
  - Total: 9.0 km^{2} (3.5 sq mi)
- Elevation: 104 m (341 ft)

Population (2025-01-01)
  - Total: 2,495
  - Density: 280/km^{2} (720/sq mi)
- Demonym: vilallonguins
- Time zone: UTC+1 (CET)
  - Summer (DST): UTC+2 (CEST)
- Postal code: 43141
- Website: vilallongadelcamp.cat

Vilallonga del Camp (Catalan pronunciation: [ˌviləˈʎoŋgə ðəl ˈkam]) is a municipality in the Province of Tarragona, Catalonia, Spain. It has a population of 2,495 (register office, 2025). Vilallonga del Camp is the only village within the municipality. It is located north of the provincial capital of Tarragona, roughly 12 miles from the coast. It lies along the A-27 road, north of El Morell and La Pobla de Mafumet, near El Rourell, just to the northeast. Heavily surrounded by fields full of crops, the municipality's main economic activity is agriculture; mainly hazelnuts, grapes, almonds, olive and carob trees.

== History ==
The first manor in the area was first mentioned in documents in 1174. In 1213, Pere I made a pledge to limit the growth of the immediate area and so remained in the hands of the court until 1391, when the King Juan I of Aragon sold it to the archbishop of Tarragona. Later it was in hands of the Montoliu family, who retained in possession until the fourteenth century. A census of 1358 documents a Berenguer de Requesens being an owner of the manor, although in 1365-70 it was back with the Montoliu family with Berenguer de Montoliu.

In the seventeenth century, Vilallonga was in the hands of the Dalmases family and in 1710 the lord of the town, Pau Ignasi de Dalmases i Roc, was appointed by the Archduke Carlos, 1st Marquis of Vilallonga. In 1838, a violent battle occurred between the militiamen and the "carlists". commanded by Llarg de Copons during which 138 men lost their lives. Vilallonga del Camp became a formal municipality on 19 February 1937.

== Culture ==
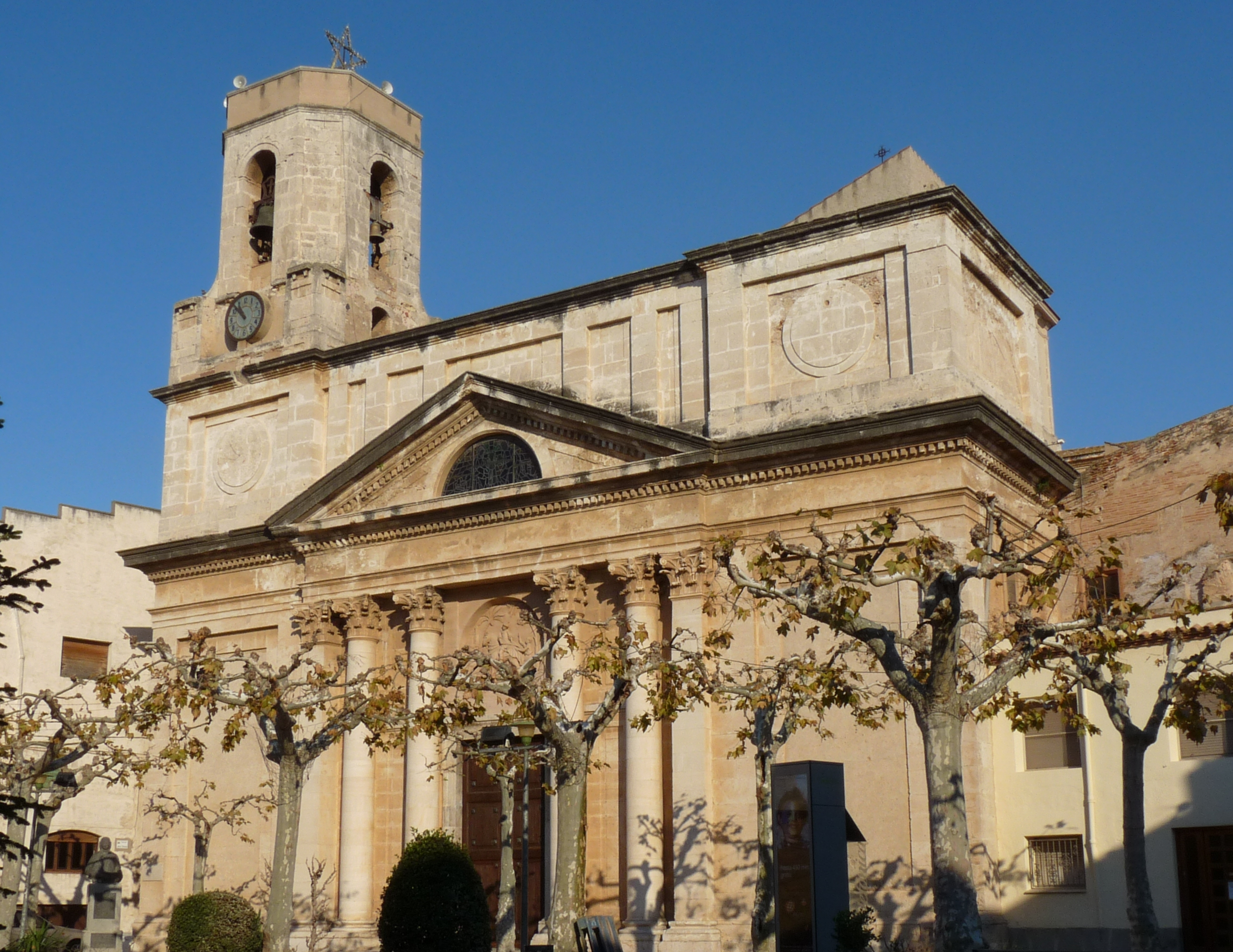
Sant Martí Church

The parish church is dedicated to Sant Martí and is built in the seventeenth century neoclassical style; its facade is unfinished. At the top of the door is a relief representing the saint sharing his cloak with a beggar. Over the cornice is a triangular pediment that is supported by four columns with Corinthian capitals. On the outskirts of the village is a shrine dedicated to the Mare de Déu del Roser whose construction date is unknown. It contains one of the entrances to the old city wall and is mentioned in Francesc Blasi Vallespinosa's, "Santuaris Marians…".

The feast day of Vilallonga is the 30 July, the feast day of Sant Abdó and Sant Senen. On 11 November, another feast day is celebrated to honour to Sant Martí. The Feast of La Rosa occurs on the second Sunday of May, and the feast of Del Roser is on the second Sunday of October. There is also a fair, known to the locals as simply "Fira", which takes place on the first Sunday of October.

== Notable people ==
- Josep Mestres i Miquel (1868-1949) doctor, politician, and agronomist
- Pedro Virgili (1699-1776) -prominent royal surgeon
