= Lothar Gellert =

German lawyer, university lecturer (born in 1957)

Prof. Dr. Dr. h. c. (UA) Lothar Gellert

President of the Lazarus Union
- In office 2019–2022
- Preceded by: Wolfgang Steinhardt
- Succeeded by: Oliver Gruber-Lavin

Personal details
- Education: University of Göttingen
- Profession: lawyer, university lecturer
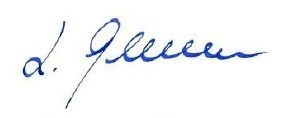
- Signature

Lothar Gellert (September 15, 1957 in Göttingen) is a German lawyer and university lecturer.

== Life ==
He studied law at the University of Göttingen.

From 1991 to 2011, he worked at the Federal Ministry of Finance in various positions and departments. During this period he was also seconded as a national expert to the European Commission's Directorates-General OLAF (2005 to 2007) and TAXUD (2009 to 2011).

Since 2011 he has been working at the Hochschule des Bundes für öffentliche Vervaltung in Münster. He is the author of a number of scholarly works and publications.

Since 2016, he has also worked in Ukraine. He became a customs policy adviser to the Head of State Fiscal Service, Roman Nasirov.

The University of Customs and Finance in Dnipro awarded him an honorary doctorate.

He has been president of Lazarus Union from 2019 to 2022. He is also a member of several Knightly Orders and the Order of the Knights of Rizal.
