= University of Human Sciences and Technology of Lugano =

University of Human Sciences and Technology of Lugano is an Applied Sciences private university located in the city of Lugano, in the Canton of Ticino, Switzerland.

The university was established in 1999.

== Courses ==
The university offers both undergraduate and post-graduate courses.
