= Pedro Virgili =

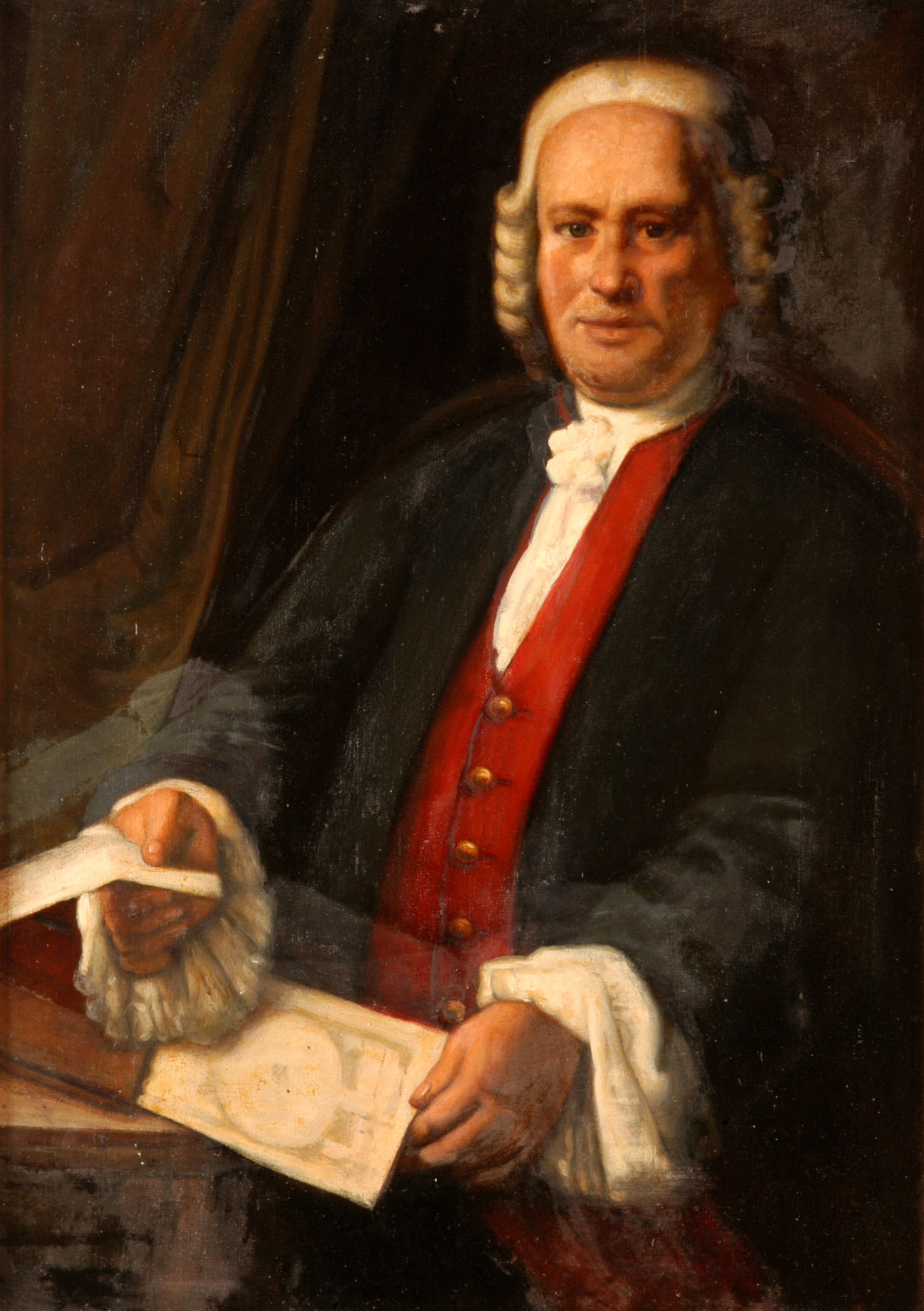
Portrait of the surgeon Pedro Virgili.

Pedro Virgili (Catalan: Pere Virgili i Bellver) (Vilallonga del Camp, Tarragona (Spain), 1699 – Barcelona (Spain), 1776) was one of the most prominent royal surgeons of Spain in the 18th century and one of the surgeons of the King of Spain. He has been described as particularly influential and was regarded as a role model by subsequent esteemed men of this profession in Spain, such as Antonio Gimbernat.

== Biography ==
He trained in the medical profession in Montpellier and Paris. He served as a military surgeon at hospitals in Tarragona, Valencia and Cádiz, where he founded the Royal College of Surgeons and the Botanical Garden of Cádiz in 1760. Along with Jorge Juan y Santacilia, Virgili organized a scientific "assembly" which they had envisioned developing into a national academy of science in Madrid. A British medical journal of 1861 said of him "What Piquer was to scientific medicine in Spain, Pedro Virgili, his contemporary, was to scientific surgery; but in this not so much by his writings, as through the powerful impetus he gave for its advancement by his successful organization of those separate surgical schools". Virgili is also noted for his use of tracheostomy to treat quinsy; the procedure is better known for treating diphtheria. One of his most notable publications was his Compendium of Midwifery, an important textbook used by new surgical colleges in Spain.

He died in 1776 at the age of 77. The military hospital Sanitari Parc Pere Virgili (his Catalan name) in Barcelona has been named in his honor. An award is also given by the City of Cádiz and the Royal Academy of Medicine in his name.
