= Fernando Virgili =

Fernando Virgili (Cerreto Sannita, 6 September 1913 – Naples, 3 April 2007), first Duke of Castelvenere, is an Italian professor, veteran and artist.

== Biography ==
Virgili attended technical studies and engineering and was a self-taught artist. A military veteran, Virgili fought in the war in Eastern Africa and in the II World War with the Italian Army, obtaining War Merit Crosses, Military Valour Crosses and some further awards. At the end of the II World War he devoted himself to the education of young people and art. His artistic works range over a period of about seventy years.

He was honored by the grant of the hereditary title of Duke of Castelvenere, from the Prince Louis Amoroso of Aragon.

His works include: short poems, watercolors and oil paintings, pen and pencil drawings, engraving on glass and on metal, creating models of clocks, wood carving, modeling clay, photography.
