= Lazarus Union =

Non-governmental organization

Corps Saint Lazarus International
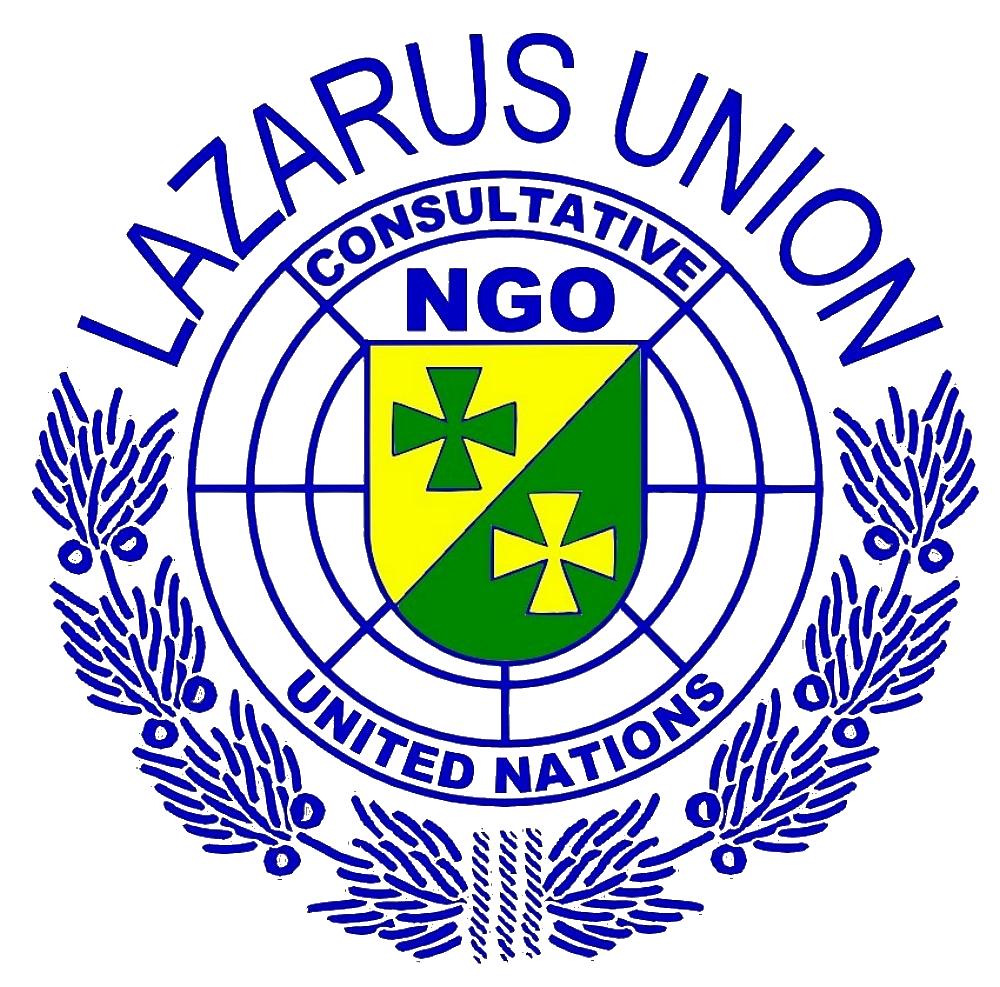
- Abbreviation: CSLI
- Founded: 2006 as a subsidiary association of the 1973 founded "Saint Lazarus Volunteers (LHW Lazarus Hilfswerk)"
- Founder: Senator Prof.h.c. Wolfgang Steinhardt PhD(USA) h.c.]
- Type: Non-profit; NGO
- VAT ID no.: ZVR 023914681
- Registration no.: 632158 (ECOSOC)
- Location: Vienna, Austria
- Services: Make the world a better place to live
- Fields: Experience days for the disabled, homeless project, education
- Members: More than 22.000 in more than 120 countries on all continents
- Board of directors: Oliver M. Gruber-Lavin (since 2022)
- Website: www.lazarus-union.org

The Corps Saint Lazarus International (CSLI), or simply the Lazarus Union, is an international non-governmental organization that focuses on humanitarian aid and civil protection, whilst following the principles of Saint Lazarus; tolerance, humility, mercy and charity. The Lazarus Union has members in more than 120 countries and enjoys General Consultative Status with the ECOSOC of the United Nations.

== History ==
CSLI was founded in Austria in 2006. It is an international organization with headquarters in Austria, in Vienna, and is recognized by the authorities of that country with registration no. 023914681 (Austrian central register). In a short time the CSLI expands in Europe and in many other countries, in each of which develops projects with local specificities. Recognized as an NGO at the UN in 2013 (Code: 632158), in 2014 it obtained special consultative status at the UN ECOSOC and in 2019 the general consultative status.

The reference to Lazarus is not so much to the Christian saint, Lazarus Union itself derives its tradition from the Order of St. Lazarus.

== Activities ==
The Lazarus Union has a multitude of activities, mostly focused on helping those in need, such as the homeless, disabled etc. In some countries the CSLI has civil protection groups, such as in Austria, Germany, Brazil, United States and Italy.

=== Flying Days ===
Each year the Austrian CSLI arranges a "Flugtag" (Flying Day) for the disabled. The day is held at the Stockerau Airport and it is composed of a wide array of activities that the disabled can try - free of charge. Besides being able to get a free flight in several different types of planes and helicopters the visitors can also get a ride in a vintage firetruck, a WW2 jeep and other special vehicles.

=== Help for the Homeless ===
The CSLI is very active in helping the homeless. Each winter in Denmark the CSLI donates tents and sleeping bags to the homeless.

=== Music Corps ===
The CSLI have their own orchestra playing both brass band music and traditional military marches, as well as an honor guard.

== List of presidents of the Lazarus Union ==
- 2006 - 2019: (Austria) Wolfgang Steinhardt
- 2019 - 2022: (Germany) Lothar Gellert
- 2022 - 2026: (Austria) Oliver M. Gruber-Lavin
- 2026 - ongoing: (India) Dinesh Sabnis
