= Montferri =

- Municipality
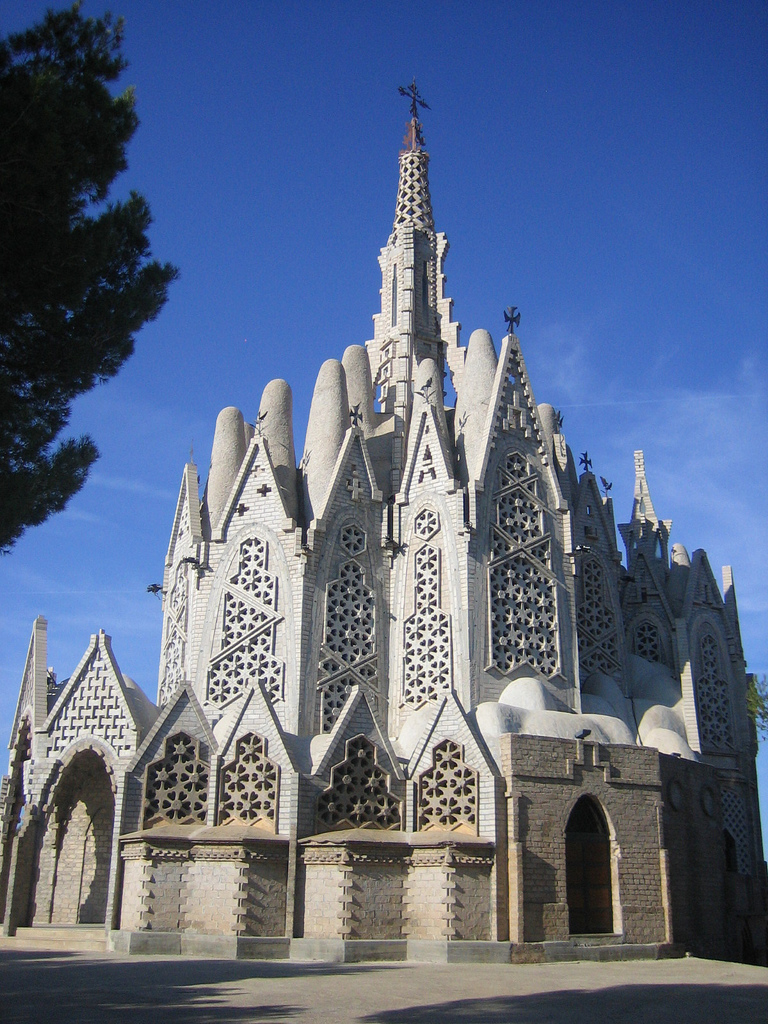
- Sanctuary of Mare de Déu de Montserrat, designed by Josep M. Jujol

- Coat of arms

- Location in Catalonia Montferri (Spain)
- Coordinates: 41°16′2″N 1°22′1″E
- Country: Spain
- Community: Catalonia
- Province: Tarragona
- Comarca: Alt Camp

Government
  - Mayor: Josep Ruiz Marín (2015)

Area
  - Total: 19.2 km^{2} (7.4 sq mi)
- Elevation: 229 m (751 ft)

Population (2025-01-01)
  - Total: 502
  - Density: 26.1/km^{2} (67.7/sq mi)
- Demonym: Montferrienc
- Postal code: 43812
- Website: www.montferri.altanet.org

Montferri (Catalan pronunciation: [muɱˈfɛri]) is a municipality in the comarca of Alt Camp, province of Tarragona, Catalonia, Spain. It is home to the sanctuary of Mare de Déu de Montserrat (Our Lady of Montserrat), a small Modernist church by Josep Maria Jujol. It has a population of 502 (register office, 2025).

== See also ==
- Vilardida
