= Josep Maria Jujol =

Catalan architect (1879–1949)

Coordinates: 41°12′32″N 1°15′55″E

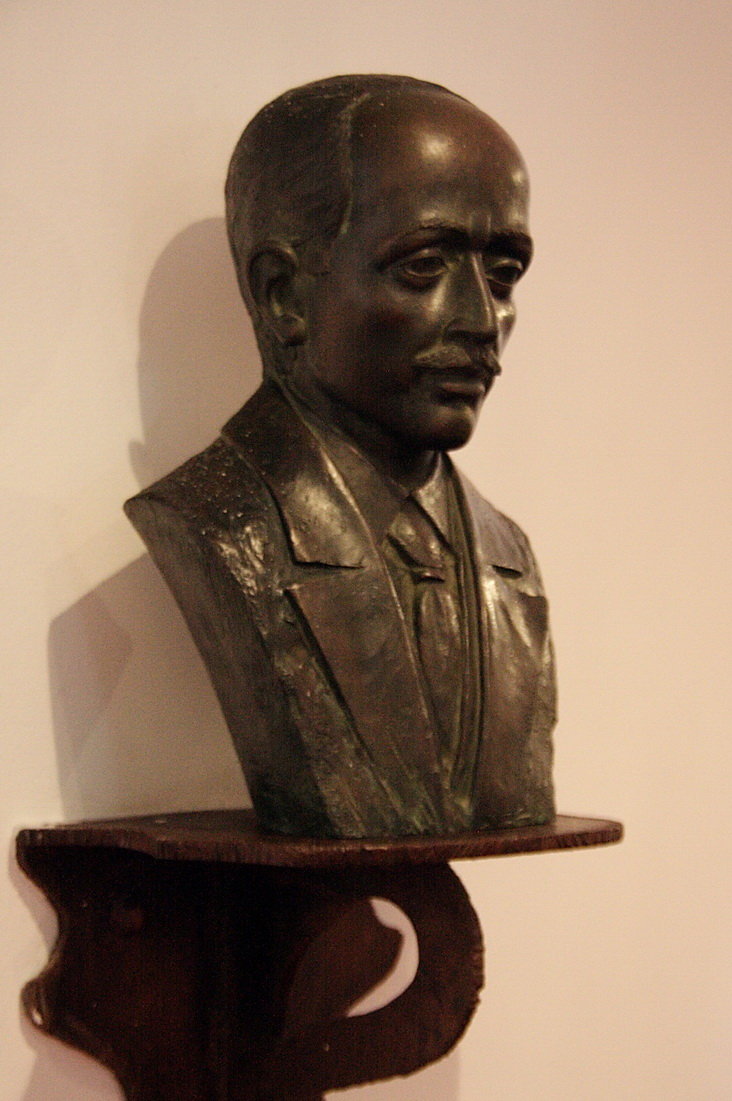
- Bust of José María Jujol at the Tarragona Theatre
- Born: 16 September 1879; Tarragona, Spain
- Died: 1 May 1949 (aged 69); Barcelona, Spain
- Occupation: Architect
- Buildings: Casa Batlló, Casa Milà, Park Güell, Our Lady of Montserrat

José María Jujol Gibert (16 September 1879 – 1 May 1949) was a Catalan Spanish architect. Jujol's wide field of activity ranged from furniture designs and painting, to architecture. He worked with Antoni Gaudí on many of his most famous works. Among Jujol's projects are Casa Batlló, Casa Milà, Park Güell, and Our Lady of Montserrat, and among his design styles are Modernisme and Art Nouveau.

== Biography ==
=== Early life ===
Josep Maria Jujol was born in Tarragona where he lived until age 9. He was the son of Andreu Jujol, a school director, and of Teresa Gibert i Vives. He was born on the top floor of the public school, Sant Joan, where his father worked. He began to draw at an early age, and always had an admiration for nature. According to his biography, he would roam the hills of Tarragona and its Roman ruins. They lived at the school for nine years before his father was transferred in 1888 to Carrer Zurbano in Gràcia, which is now integrated into the City of Barcelona.

=== Barcelona ===
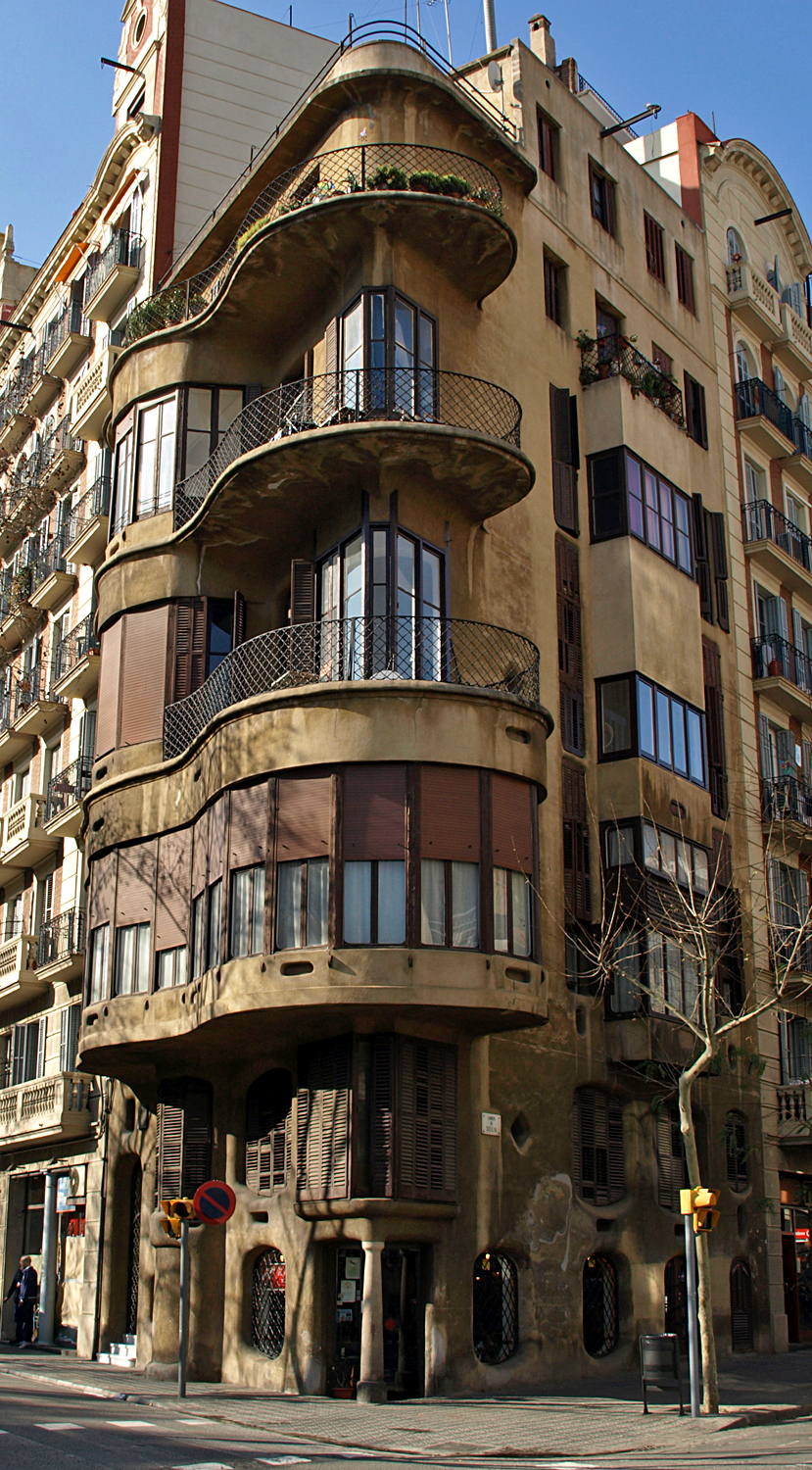
Casa Planells, in Barcelona, before it was restored

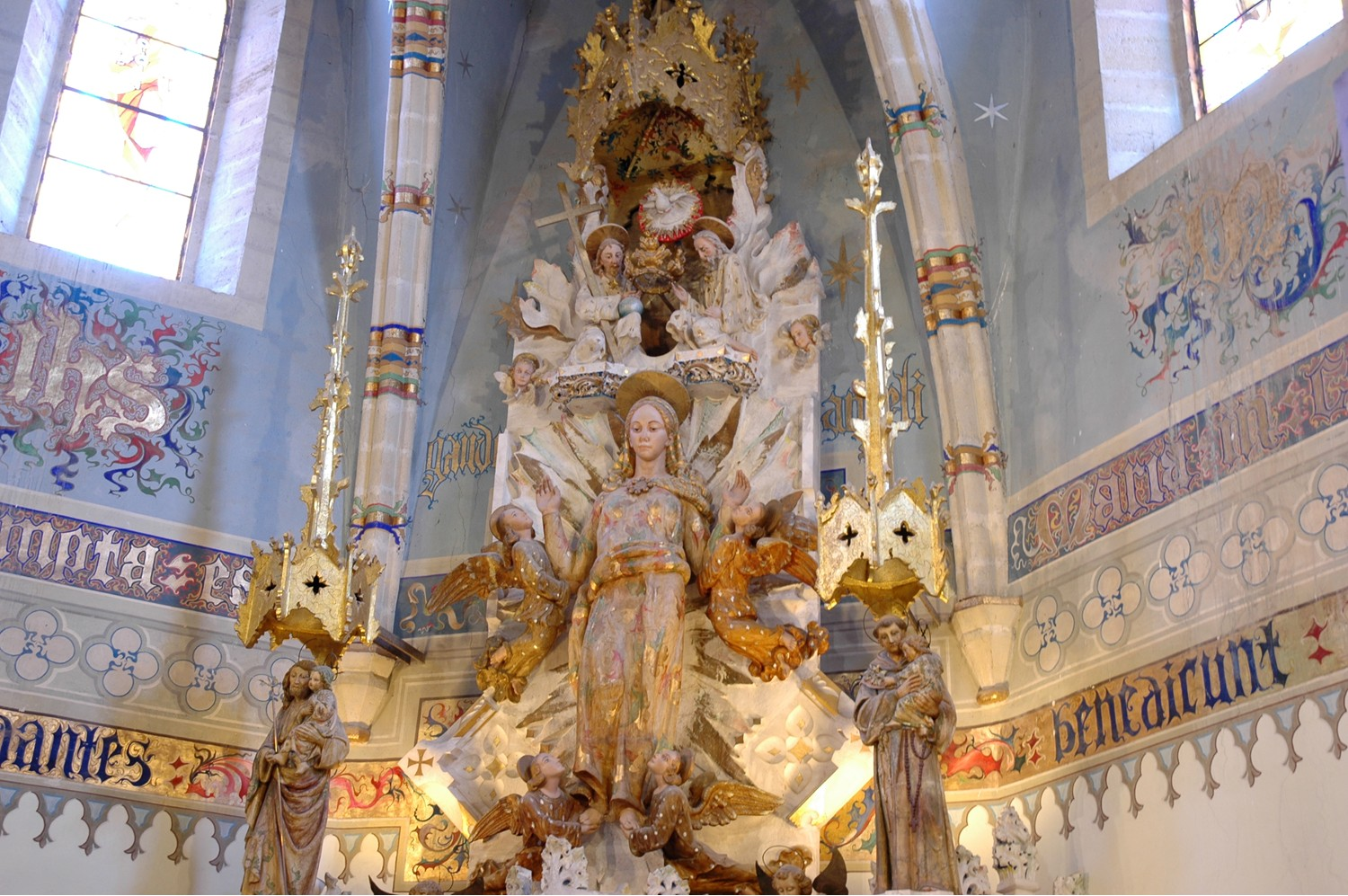
One of his earlier commissions, Trinity altar in the Basilica de Santa Maria del Mar.

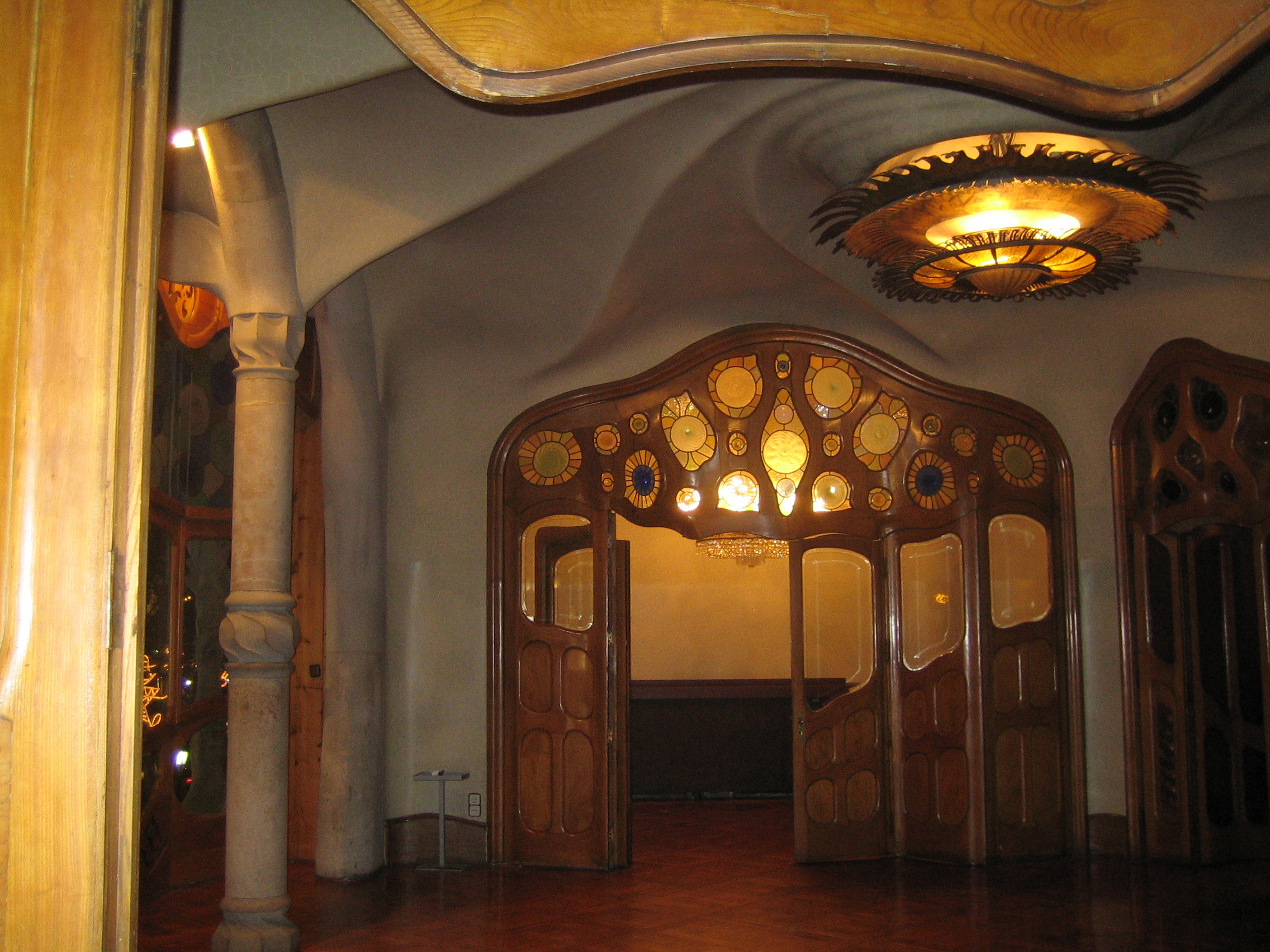
Casa Batlló, his first project with Antoni Gaudí.

Jujol's father was transferred once again in 1893 to the City of Barcelona. There Jujol began to walk the medieval district, developed an admiration for gothic architecture and began to draft the buildings. The family moved to the Gran Via in the Eixample District of Barcelona, where he experienced modern and modernist buildings. In 1901, he was accepted in the Architectural program in Barcelona. While attending school, he first worked with Antoni Maria Gallissa i Soqué (Don Antoni), whom he admired as a person and an architect. His first project was a commission for Don Antoni to decorate the street called Carrer Fenen for the Mercè Festival (Festes de la Mercè). Jujol had to create the metal frames and stained glass windows. He continued to work for Don Antoni until 1903. He then began to work in the studio of Josep Font i Gumà. Where he collaborated with him on the Trinity altar in the Basilica de Santa Maria del Mar. In his spare time he completed plans for an amusement park that was to emulate the Solar System. The plan was never revived.

=== Independent work ===
In 1906 he received his certificate as an architect and was able to work on his own. One of his first projects was to decorate Don Antoni's entrance stairway with his trademark sgraffito.

Jujol became acquainted with Antoni Gaudí through their mutual friend, Dr. Santaló. Gaudí soon worked in partnership with Jujol. Their first project together was Casa Batlló. It is speculated in Jujol's biography that he had a great influence on Gaudí's use of colour and shapes. However, this is not for certain. In any case, Gaudí had great respect for Jujol's views and entrusted him as a collaborator on his projects for many years.

=== Death ===
Jujol died at Barcelona in 1949.

== Works ==
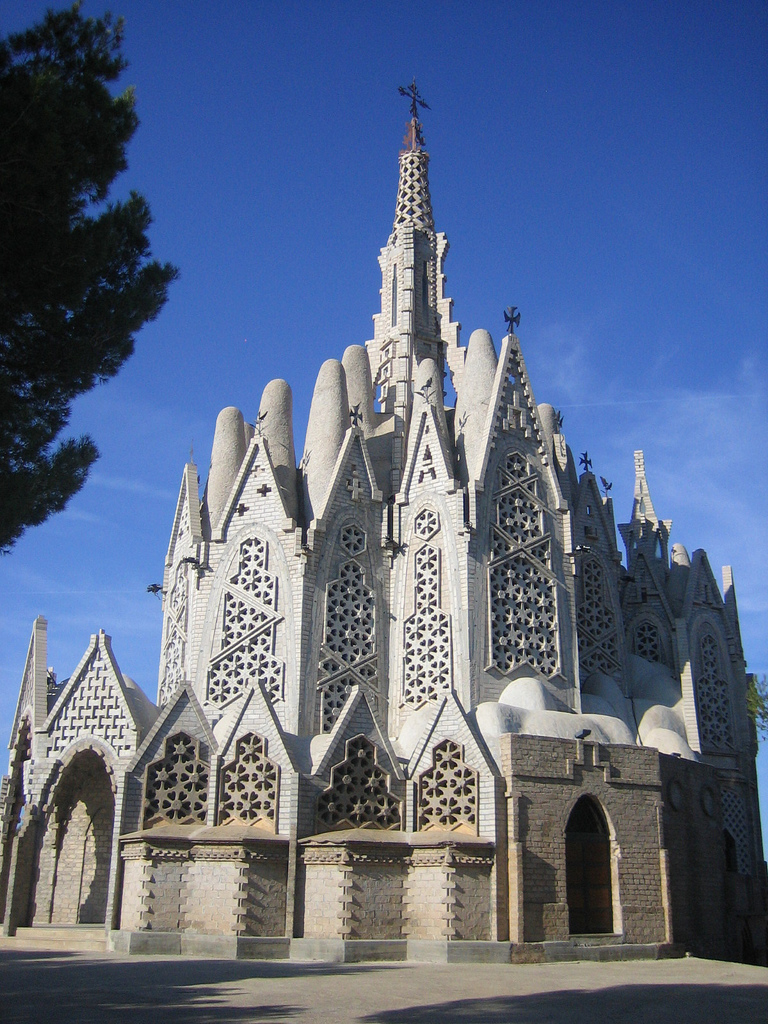
Montserrat Church in Montferri, Alt Camp, near Tarragona.

- Casa Batlló (collaboration with Antoni Gaudí), Barcelona, 1906. Decorated the 1st floor, created the Sacras and added ceramic on the building's façade.
- Casa Milà (la Pedrera) (collaboration with Antoni Gaudí), Barcelona, 1908. Ornamented the main apartment, finished the chimneys, designed the high-relief plaster bands that surround the wooden door frames.
- Patronat Obrer Theatre, Tarragona, 1908.
- Torre Sansalvador, Barcelona, 1909–1915.
- Casa Mañach, Barcelona, 1911.
- Park Güell (collaboration with Antoni Gaudí), Barcelona, 1911–1913. Decorated the benches and ceilings with ceramic fragments (trencadís technique). Possibly created the medallions in the Hypostyle Hall.
- Torre de la Creu. Sant Joan Despí, Barcelonès, Province of Barcelona, 1913–1916.
- Casa Ximenis, Tarragona, 1914
- Casa Bofarull. Els Pallaresos, Tarragonès, Province of Tarragona, 1914–1931.
- Can Negre. Sant Joan Despí, Barcelonès, Province of Barcelona, 1915–1926.
- Vistabella Church (full name: Sacred Heart of Jesus Church / Església del Sagrat Cor de Jesús). La Secuita, Tarragonès, Province of Tarragona, 1918–1924.
- Torre Serra-Xaus. Sant Joan Despí, Barcelonès, Province of Barcelona, 1921–1927.
- Casa Planells, Barcelona, 1923–24
- Montserrat Sanctuary (full name: Our Lady of Montserrat Sanctuary / Santuari de la Mare de Déu de Montserrat), Montferri, Alt Camp, Province of Tarragona, 1926-1935 (unfinished)
- Torre Jujol. Sant Joan Despí, Barcelonès, Province of Barcelona, 1932.

== Gallery ==
Works

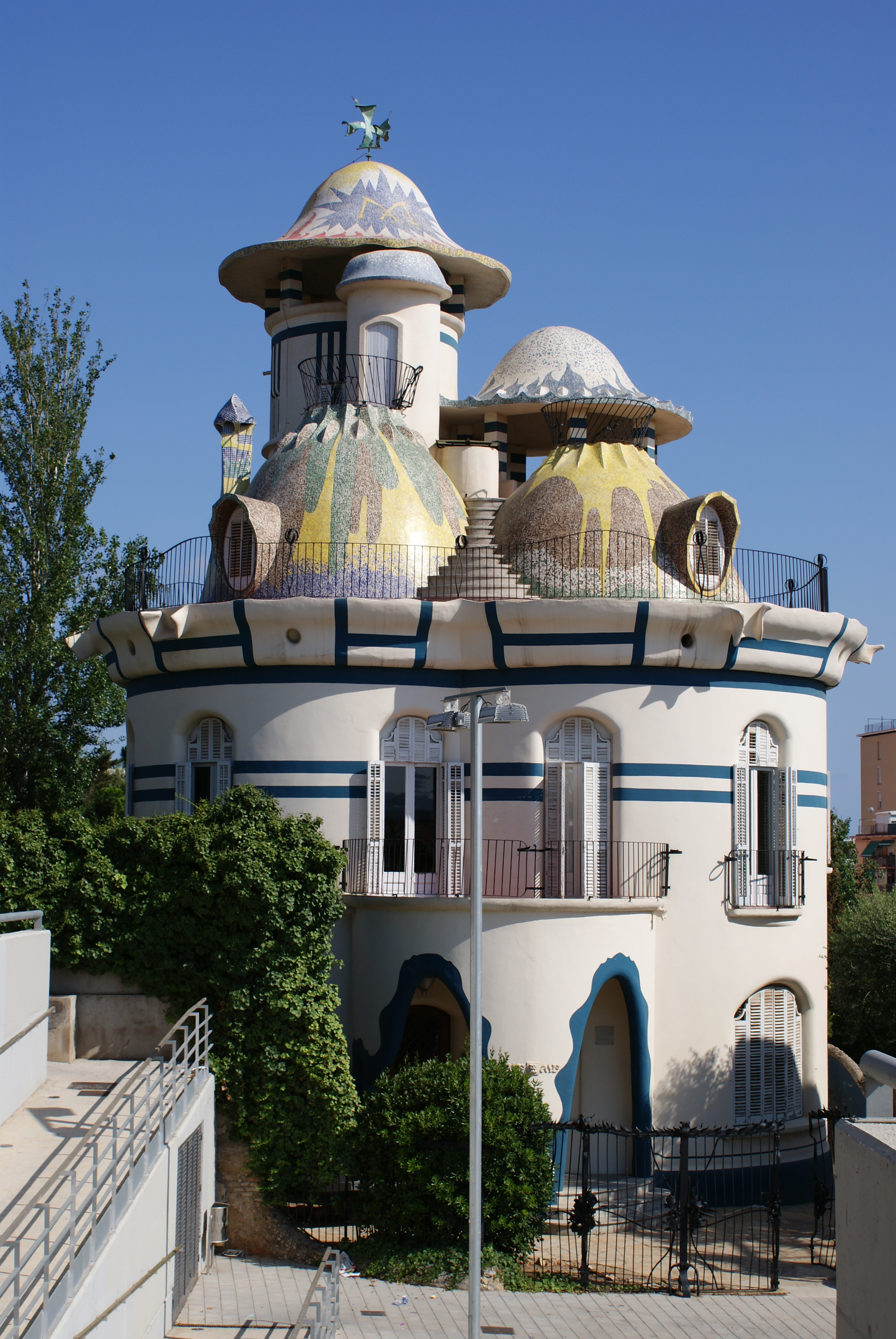
Torre de la Creu, a private house in Sant Joan Despí, near Barcelona.

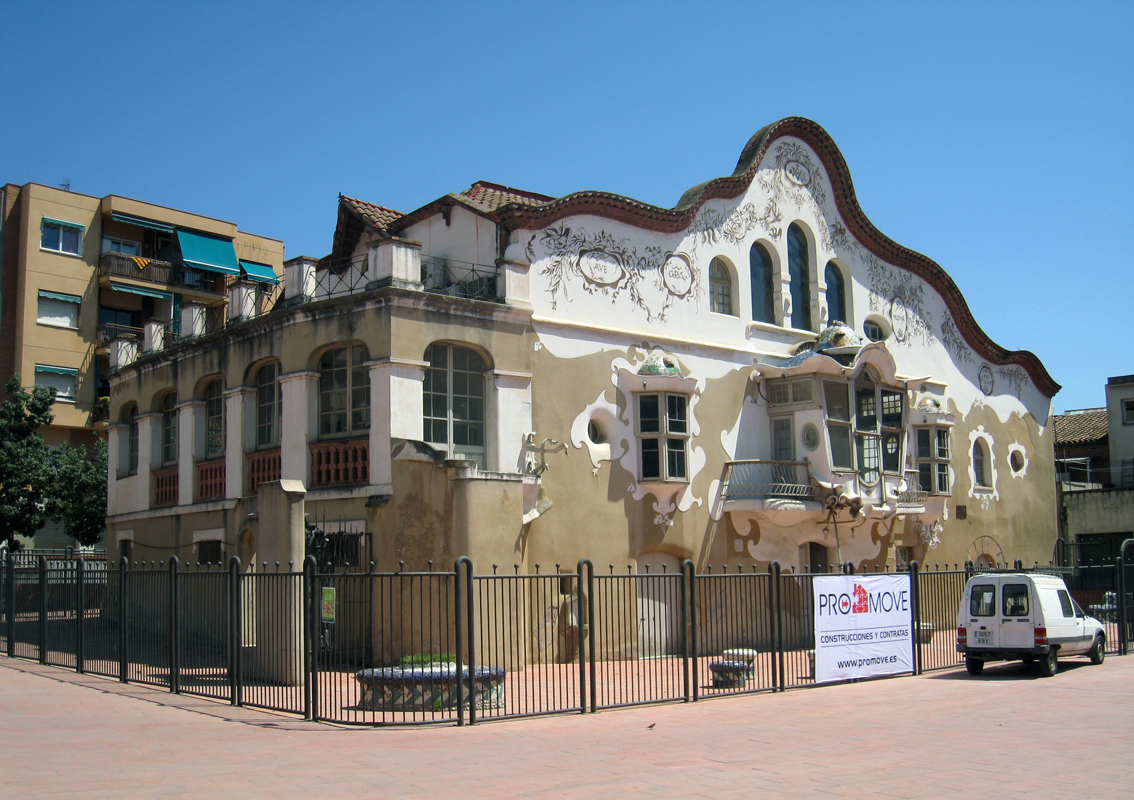
Can Negre, Sant Joan Despí, near Barcelona.

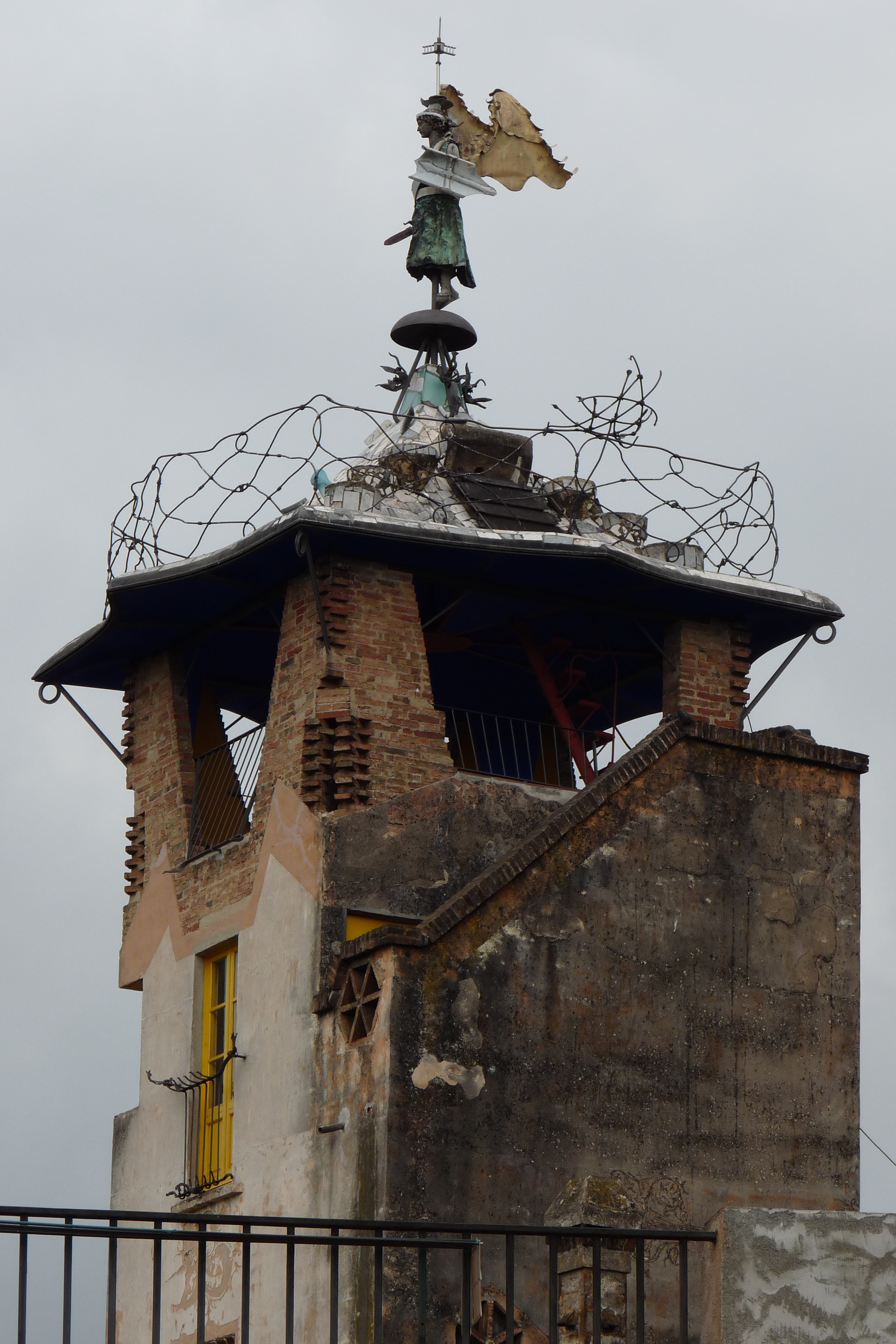
Tower on Casa Bofarull in Els Pallaresos, near Tarragona

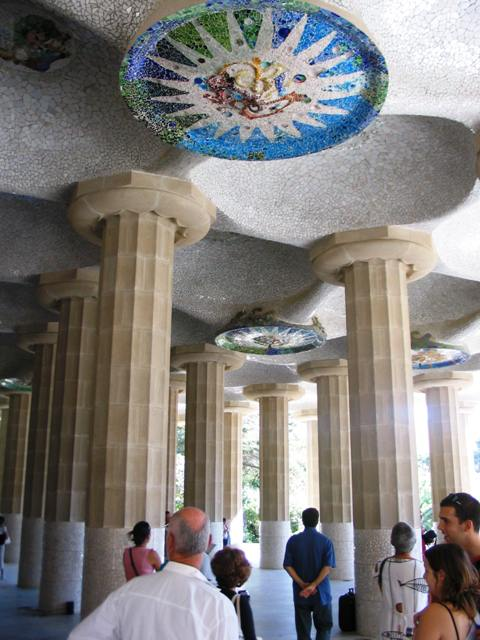
Parc Güell detail (Barcelona)

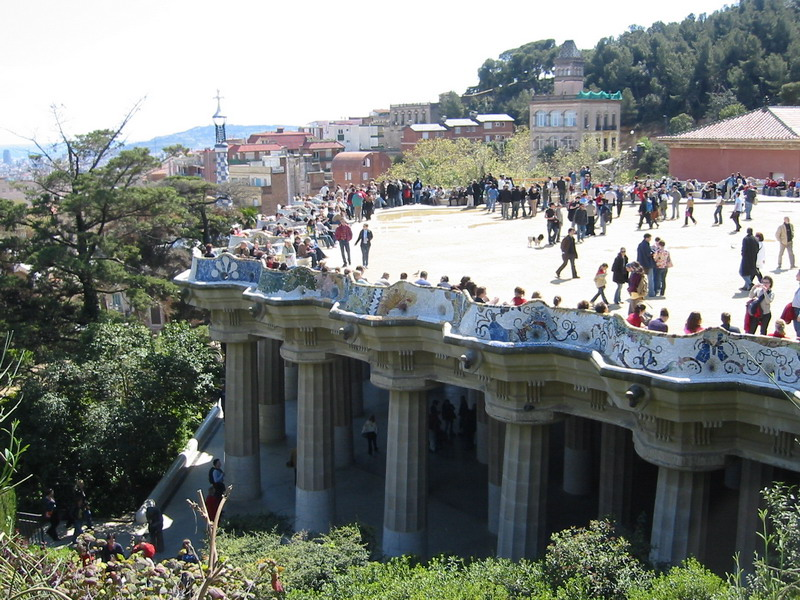
Parc Güell detail (Barcelona)

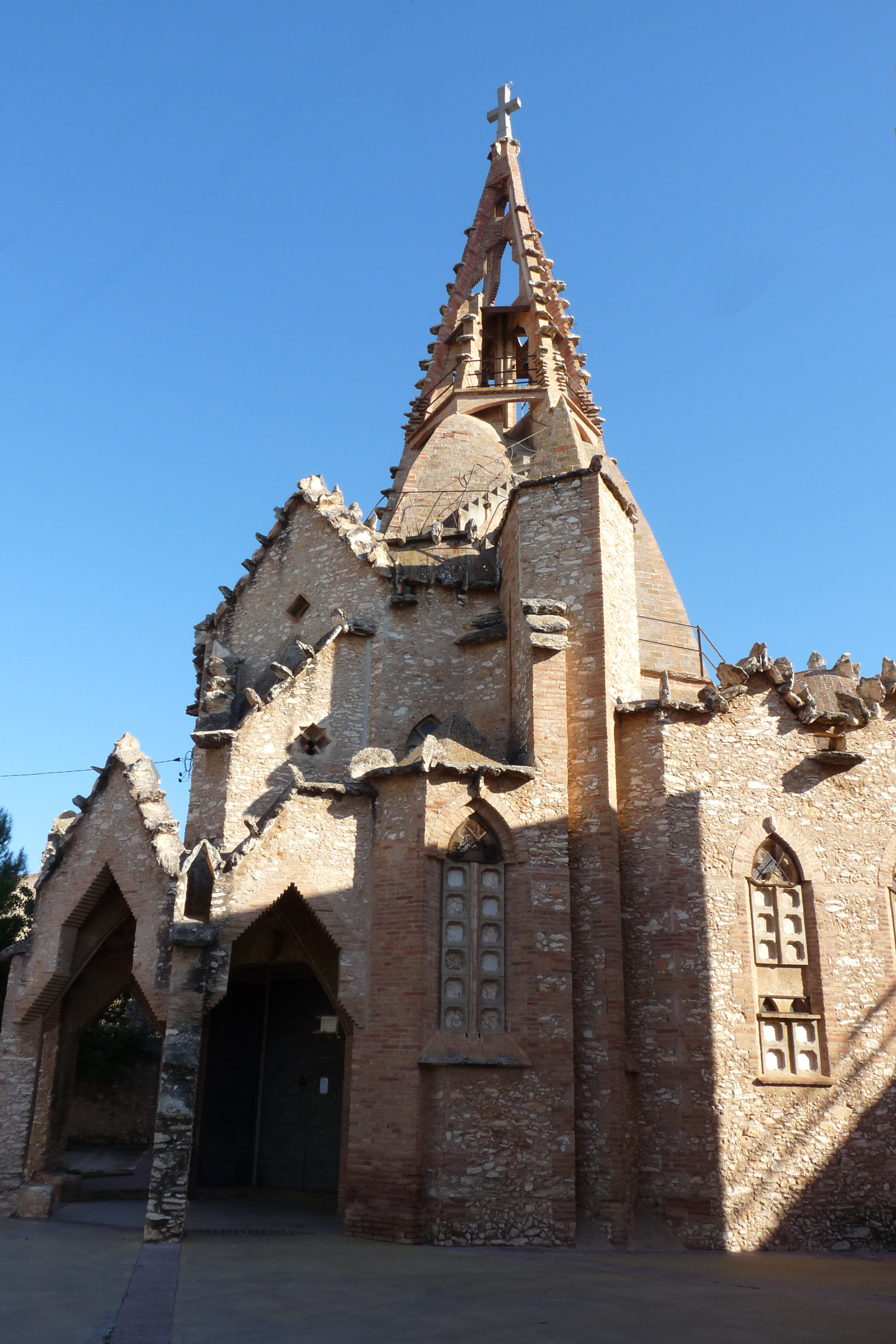
Vistabella Church, in La Secuita, near Tarragona.

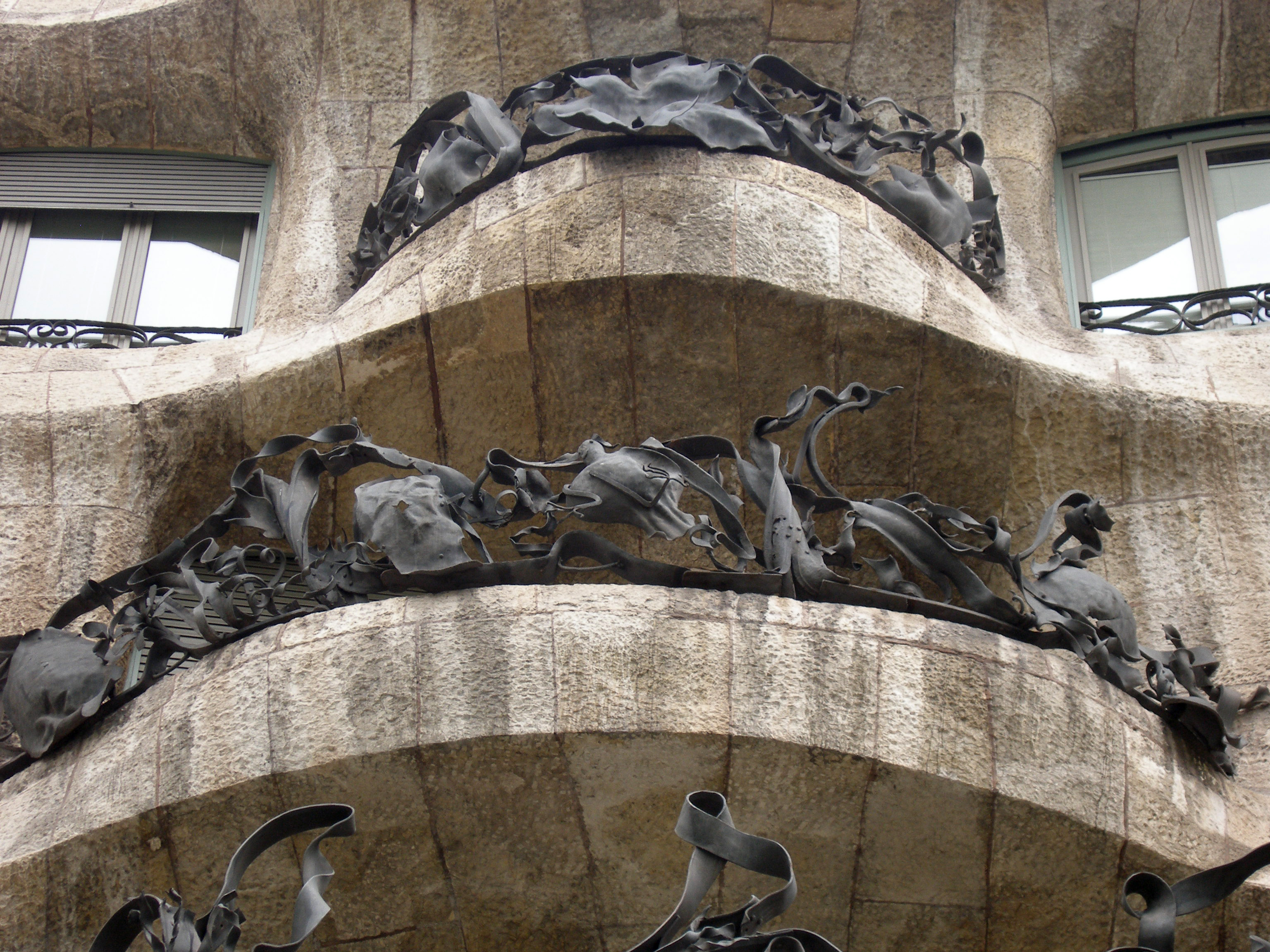
Casa Milà detail (Barcelona)

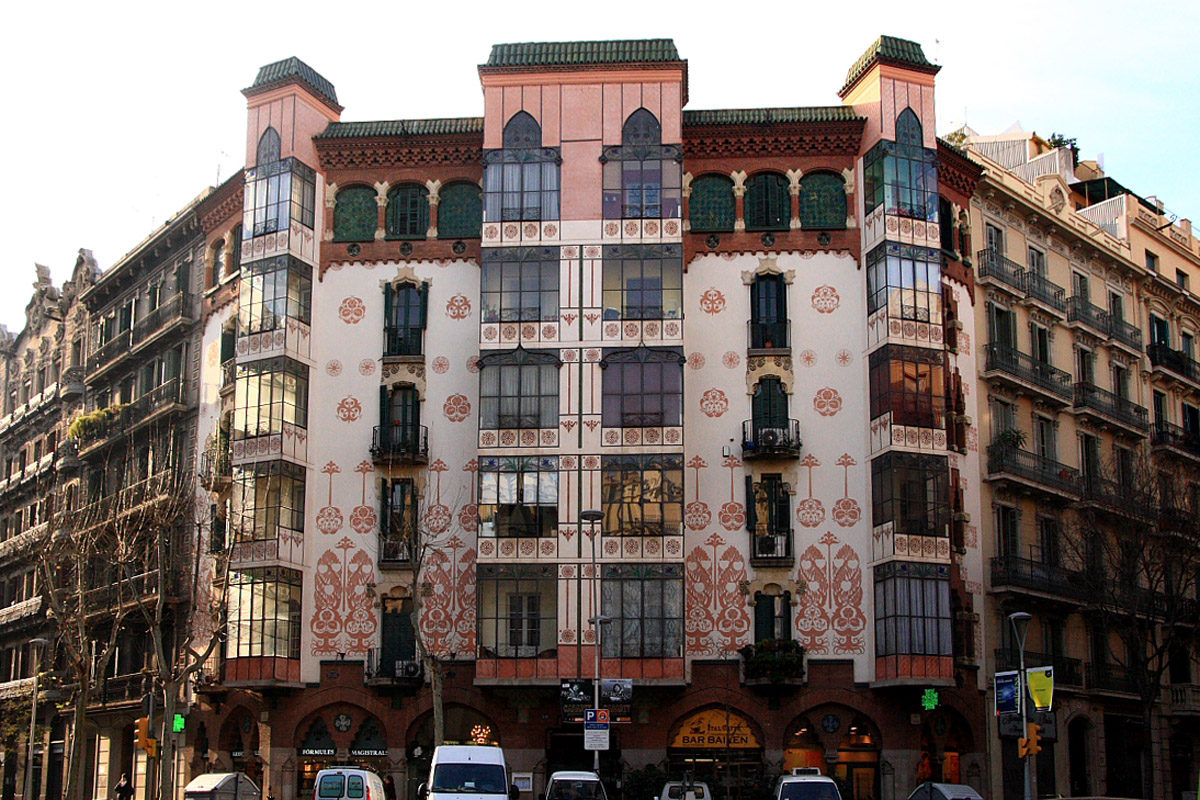
He added the "graffiti" patterns

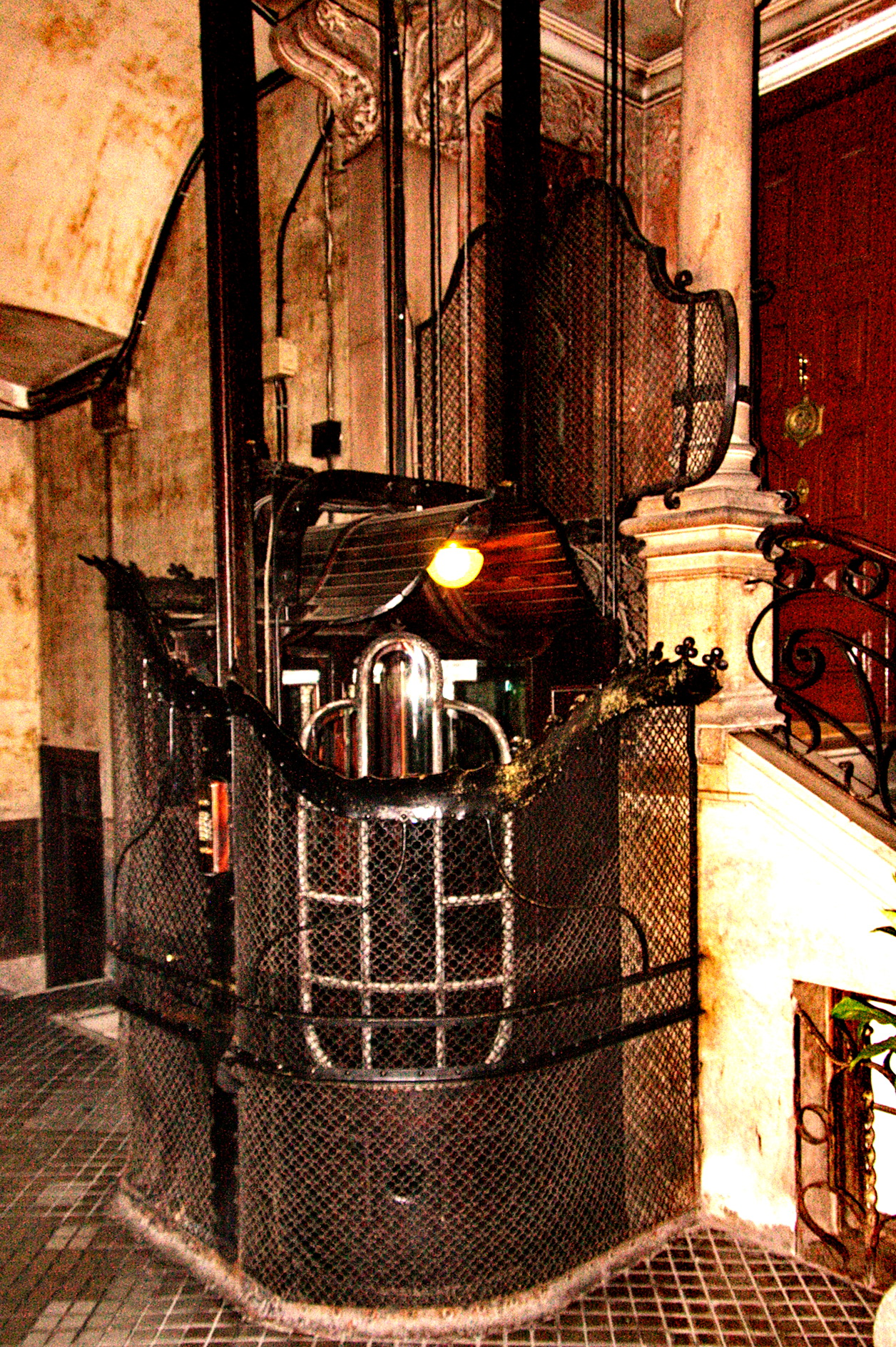
Stairs of the Iglesias house, 284 Mallorca street (Barcelona), by Josep Maria Jujol in 1913.

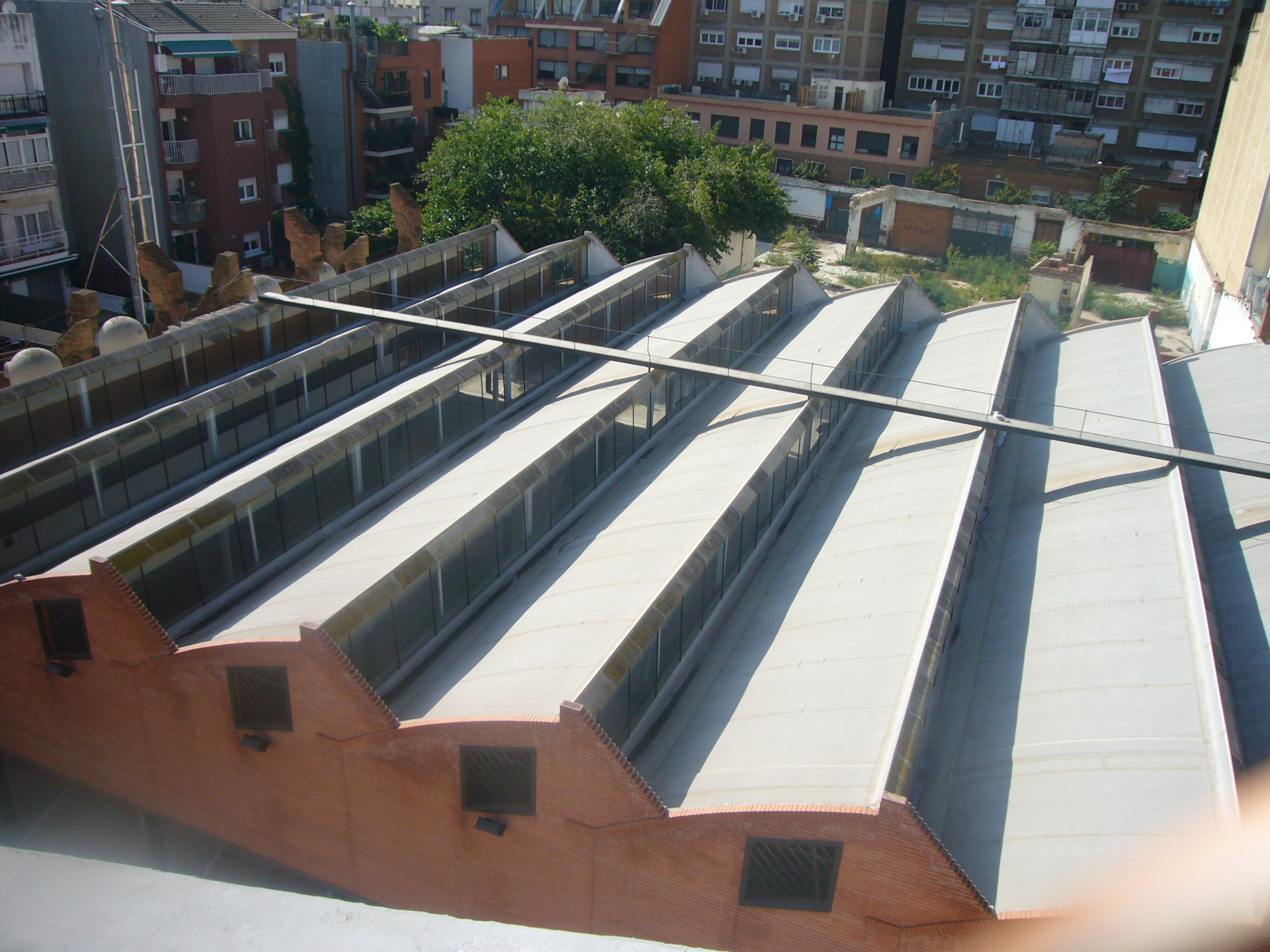
Mañach Workshop, in Barcelona, currently converted into a school. (1916)

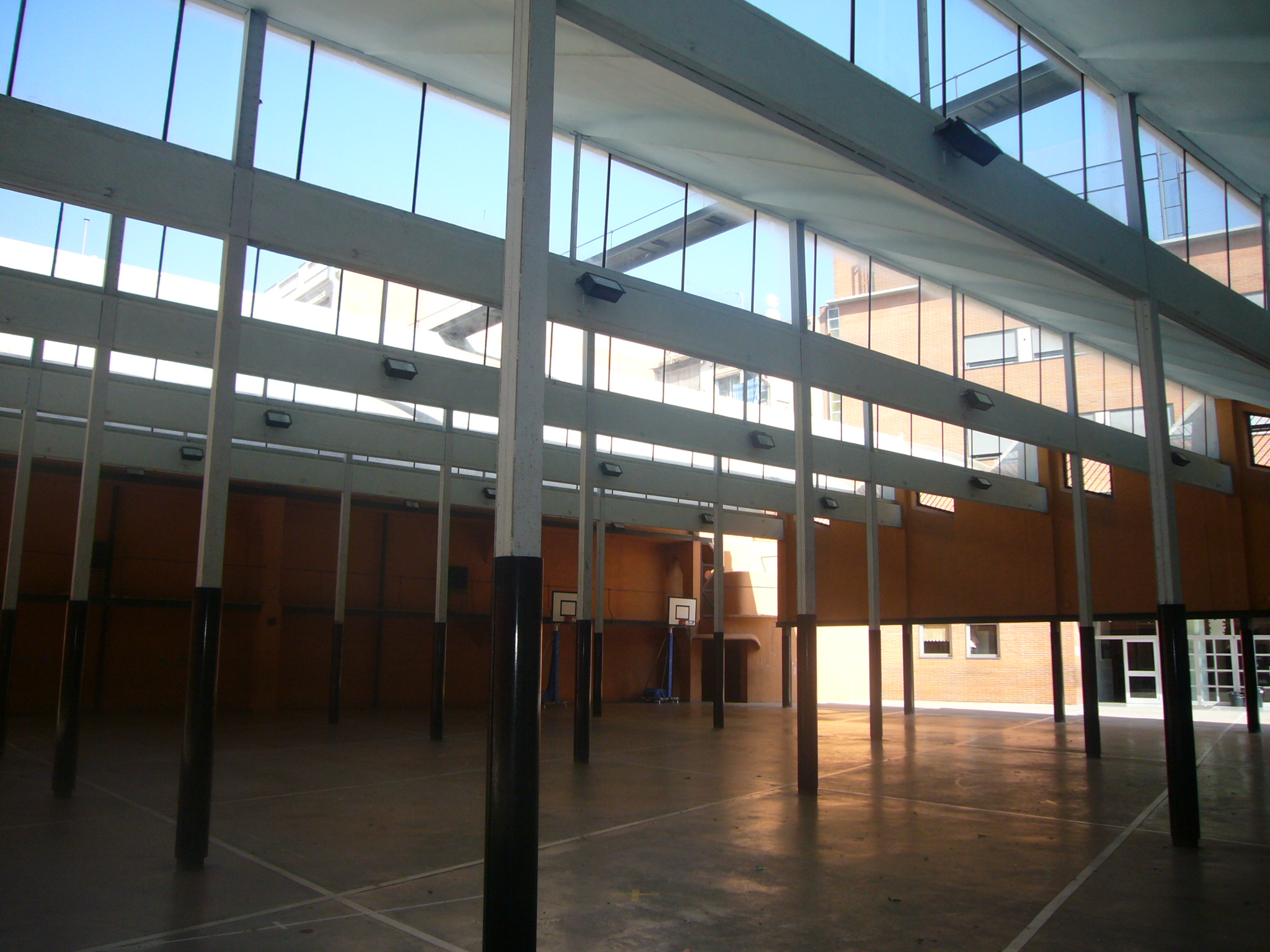
Mañach Workshop, commissioned by Pere Mañach to Josep Maria Jujol (1916)

== Sources ==
- Josep, Maria Jujol Jr., The Architecture of Jujol, trans. by Ronald Christ, SITES Books, Santa Fe. 1996.
- Ignasi de Solà-Morales: Jujol, Ediciones Poligrafa, 1990
