= Vilardida =

- Municipality
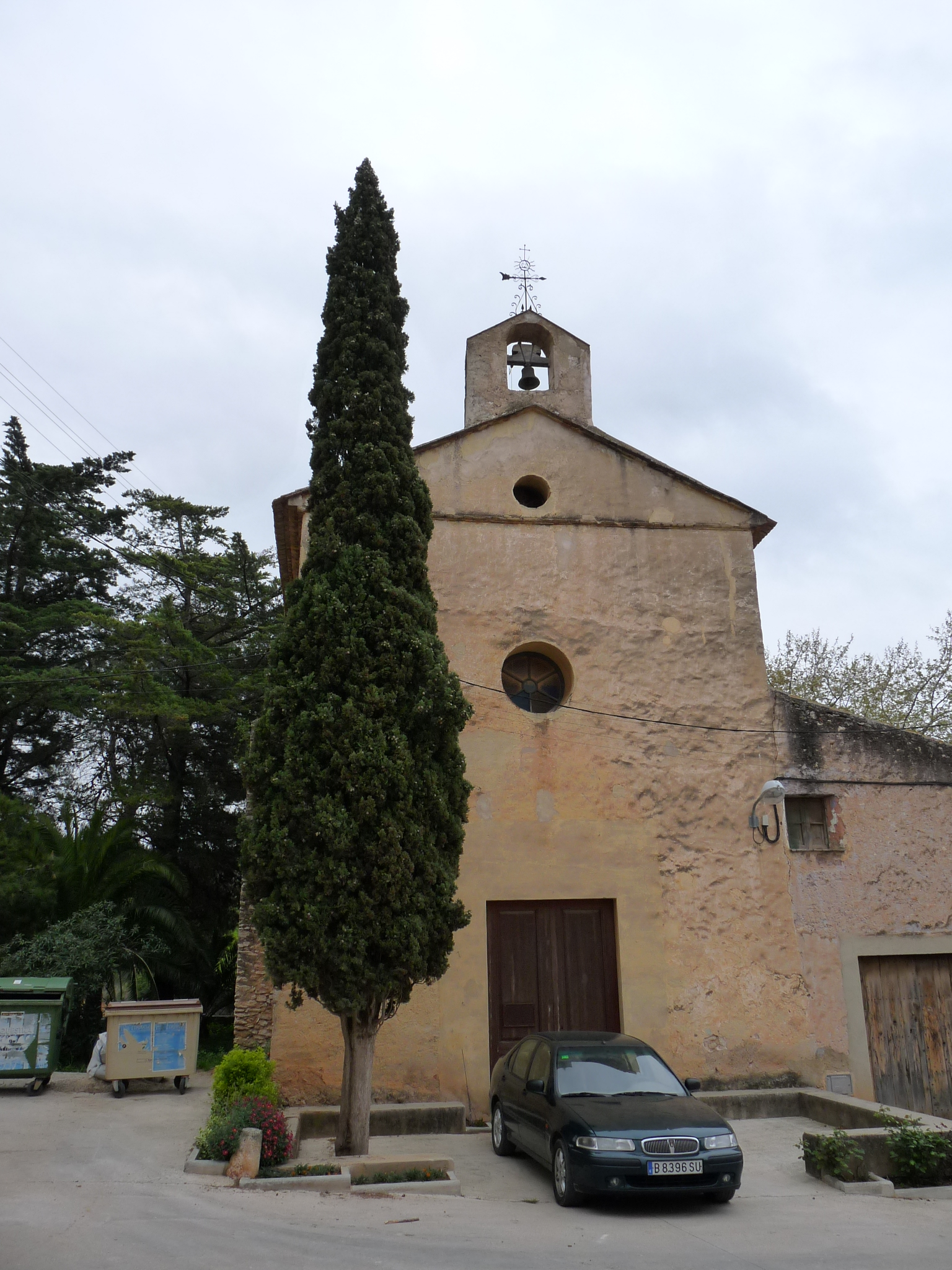
- Chapel of Vilardida
- Interactive map of Vilardida
- Map showing Vilardida in Catalonia
- Coordinates: 41°17′09″N 1°21′47″E
- Community: Catalonia
- Comarca: Alt Camp

Vilardida is a village in the Alt Camp, Tarragona, Catalonia, Spain. The population in 2003 is indicated by Municat as 3 and also as 27 people. This confusion is probably because the village falls under the jurisdiction of two municipalities: Vila-rodona and Montferri. The probable population today is about 10 people and the village covers an area of about 10,000m^{2}. The elevation is 285 m above sea level. It is situated at the "T" junction to Montferri on the main road C51 between El Vendrell and Valls and at 2.5 km from exit 11 of the motorway AP2 from Barcelona to Lleida.

The name (which translated means "burnt village") was first cited in 1009 as Villa Ardidam because of the fires lit by the Bishops from Barcelona at that time.

The small church, Saint Mary of Vilardida, was built in the 18th century, although many of the village's buildings date back to the 15th century.

The village lies in wine growing area on the edge of a small fertile flood plain, 400m from the Gaià River. This river flows all year round down into a large reservoir in the three municipalities: Renau, Vilabella and El Catllar and then out into the Mediterranean Sea at Altafulla, near Tamarit castle.
