= La Secuita =

- Municipality
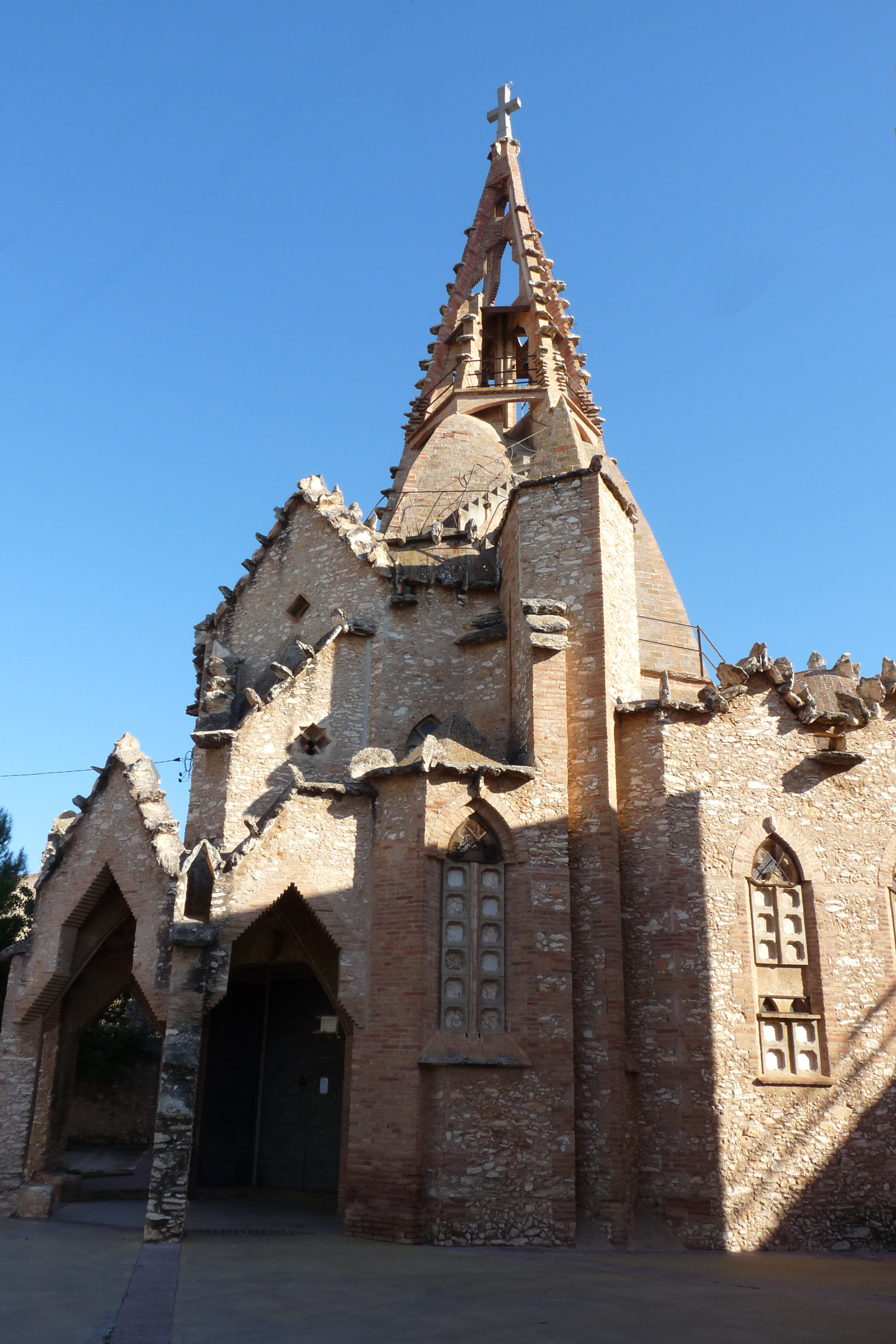
- The Modernist temple of Vistabella, designed by Josep M. Jujol

- Flag Coat of arms

- Location in Catalonia La Secuita (Spain)
- Coordinates: 41°12′22″N 1°16′53″E
- Country: Spain
- Community: Catalonia
- Province: Tarragona
- Comarca: Tarragonès

Government
  - mayor: Eudald Roca Gràcia (2015)

Area
  - Total: 17.8 km^{2} (6.9 sq mi)
- Elevation: 170 m (560 ft)

Population (2025-01-01)
  - Total: 1,845
  - Density: 104/km^{2} (268/sq mi)
- Demonym: Secuitenc
- Postal code: 43765
- Website: www.lasecuita.cat

La Secuita (Catalan pronunciation: [lə səˈkujtə]) is a village in the province of Tarragona and autonomous community of Catalonia, Spain. With a population of 1,845 (register office, 2025), La Secuita is some 428km East of Madrid, the country's capital city.
