= Vall de Ribes =

Coordinates: 42°18′26.42″N 2°10′7.88″E

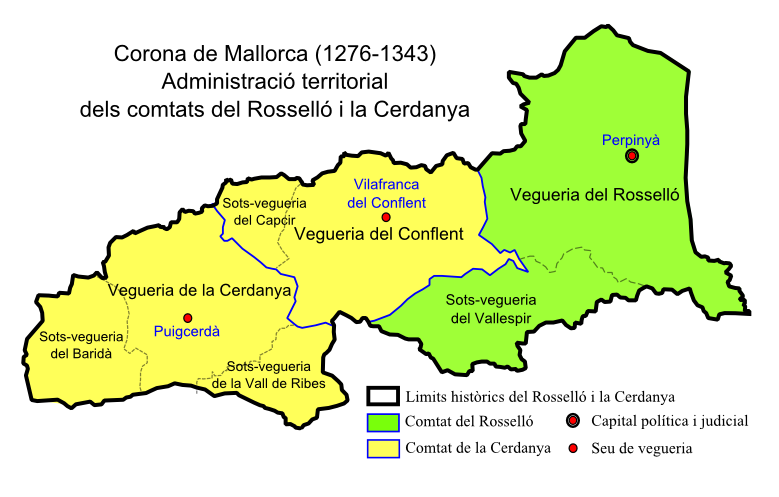
Map showing the Vall de Ribes as part of the administrative structure of the counties of Cerdagne and Roussillon under the Crown of Majorca

The Vall de Ribes is a geographic zone in the northwest of the Ripollès in the valley of the river Freser. Its largest municipality is Ribes de Freser. It also contains the municipalities of Queralbs, Toses, Planoles, Pardines and Campelles, and the sanctuary and resort of Vall de Núria.

The Vall de Ribes was historically a part of the county of Cerdanya and ecclesiastically pertained to the diocese of Urgell. This made it unlike the rest of the Ripollès, which was part of the county of Osona and the diocese of Vic. During the rule of Count Ramon Berenguer IV, it was associated with the county of Besalú. There must have been fortifications there, and both these and the comital demesne lands were enfeoffed to Galceran de Sales before 1151. The demesne was administered by (but not enfeoffed to) Ramon de Ribes in 1158, when the entire valley was inventoried. In 1162, along with Besalú, the Vall de Ribes was granted for life to Peronella, the widow of the count, and a survey of it was made. During this time, several complaints were lodged with the count, Alfons I, against Ramon, alleging that he acted independently of any higher authority. At Peronella's death in 1173, the demesne reverted to Alfons, who in 1194 granted the mills to the monastery of Santa Maria de Ripoll. In 1198 Ramon's son and namesake was baiulus and castellan there.

Today, the valley is an attraction for its natural beauty, its montane vegetation and its remaining Catalan Romanesque architecture. The Romanesque painting known as the baldachin of Ribes, from the second quarter of the twelfth century, is from the area.
