= Torreneules =

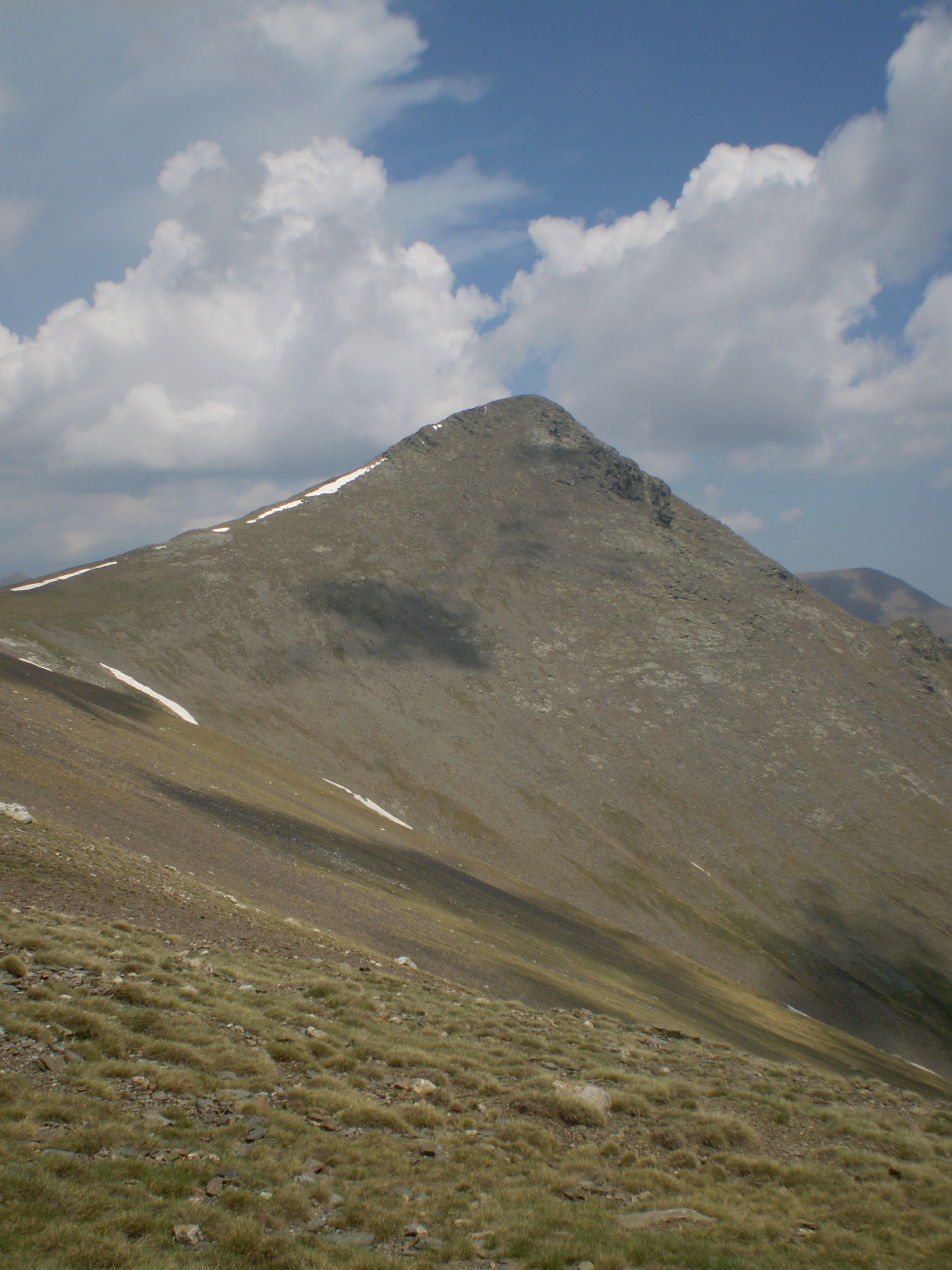

Highest point
- Elevation: 2,713 m (8,901 ft)
- Coordinates: 42°23′26.94″N 2°11′46.48″E

Geography
- Location within Pyrenees
- Location: Ripollès, Catalonia
- Parent range: Pyrenees

Climbing
- First ascent: Unknown
- Easiest route: From Queralbs

Torreneules is a mountain of Catalonia, Spain. Located in the Pyrenees, it has an elevation of 2,713 metres above sea level.

== See also ==
- Mountains of Catalonia
