= Francisco Coll Guitart =

Spanish Dominican priest and saint 1812–1875)

Saint Francisco Coll Guitart OP
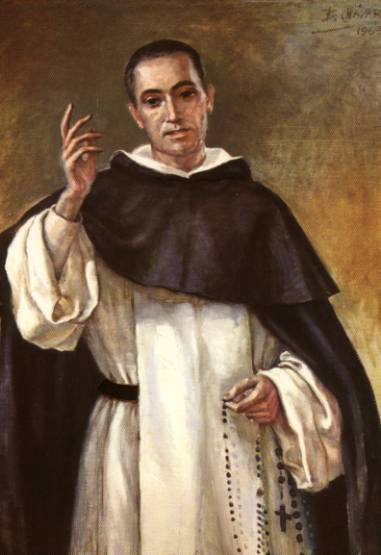

Priest
- Born: 18 May 1812; Gombrèn, Catalonia, France
- Died: 2 April 1875 (aged 62); Vic, Barcelona, Catalonia, Spain
- Honored in: Roman Catholic Church
- Beatified: 29 April 1979, Saint Peter's Square, Vatican City by Pope John Paul II
- Canonized: 11 October 2009, Saint Peter's Square, Vatican City by Pope Benedict XVI
- Feast: 2 April
- Attributes: Dominican habit
- Patronage: Congregation of the Dominican Sisters of the Annunciation of the Blessed Virgin Mary

Francisco Coll Guitart OP (Catalan: Francesc Coll i Guitart; 18 May 1812 – 2 April 1875) was a Spanish Catholic priest of the Order of Preachers and founder of the Dominican Sisters of the Annunciation of the Blessed Virgin.

He was beatified on 29 April 1979 and canonised as a saint of the Catholic Church on 11 October 2009.

== Life ==
Francisco Coll Guitart was born in Gombrèn (Ripoll) in 1812 as the tenth and last son of a wool carder. His Father died when Francisco was four years old.

He entered the seminary at Vic when he was just 10 years old. He would later meet and become friends with Antonio Maria Claret. As was customary among poor seminarians, he earned food and lodging in a country house, in exchange for helping with the literary and religious instruction of the children of the family. In 1830 he decided to join the Order of Preachers at the Dominican convent in Girona.

His studies for the priesthood and Dominican religious life were interrupted with the suppression of religious orders in 1835 by the Spanish government. During this time all religious were ejected from their properties. However he did not give up on his vocation and continued to pursue the priesthood. On 28 March 1836 he was ordained as a Dominican priest. Coll's pastoral mission was all the more difficult due to the lack of social life and the support of fellow friars that existed before the suppression of the religious orders.

From 1839 to 1849, he was curate at Moià, Catalonia, Spain, where he started charitable organisations to feed and house refugees from the Carlist Wars. In 1850 he was appointed as the director of the Dominican Third Order; he was able to reopen a suppressed Dominican convent, which gave him a base for his mission as a priest. In 1854 he worked with those struck with cholera.

For more than thirty years he exercised his ministry, first in the parishes of Artés and Moyá, and then as a missionary in various dioceses of Catalonia. His fame as a preacher grew rapidly. His main concern was to bring the Word of God in a cordial, simple and understandable way to the people. In his preaching he emphasised love for the Virgin Mary and the propagation of the Rosary. He collaborated in the "Apostolic Brotherhood" set up by Anthony Mary Claret. He was appointed an Apostolic Missionary by the Holy See.

=== Founder ===
In 1856 he founded a congregation of Dominican sisters which became known as the Congregation of the Dominican Sisters of the Annunciation of the Blessed Virgin Mary (aka La Annunciata). This group of sisters was founded as a teaching congregation. The sisters, mostly from humble origins, went on to study and obtain teaching qualifications. In some cases they also devoted themselves to the care of the sick and other works of mercy. Guitart decided that the sisters of the congregation should be devoted to those children and adolescents in most need. Thus the first communities were directed to areas of rural Catalonia working in public schools. However, in the beginning, as a result of the socio-political situation – the revolution of September 1868 – the nuns were forced to leave these schools and to found private schools, most of them under the protection of the textile factories.

After founding the first centres in Catalonia, the congregation worked in the mining areas of Asturias, and the towns of Castile and La Mancha. At the time of Guitart's death the congregation numbered at 300 sisters with 50 communities; a remarkable fact given the hostile climate of Spain toward religious at that time. The first overseas base was in Argentina in 1908. In 1955 the congregation began its activities as missionaries in Central America and later to Peru and Chile further south. The members of this congregation work in Europe, the Americas, Africa and Asia.

=== Later years ===
Coll divided his work between his missionary activity and the organisation of the Congregation. On 2 December 1869 while preaching in Sallent (in Catalonia) he suffered a stroke. His health declined and he went blind. He died on 2 April 1875.

Before his death, the suppression of religious orders was lifted in 1872, which allowed the Dominicans to return to Spain to resume their missions and religious life. The Dominicans found that while orders like theirs were gone it was Coll who had maintained the structures of the Order, allowing pastoral missions to continue and flourish. Guitart's dedication to the Dominican life even in the face of impossible odds was a remarkable character trait. His teachings and legacies continues to grow more so through the work of the Annunciata Sisters.

== Veneration ==
The preliminary investigations for Guitart's canonisation commenced in 1928 at Osona. His spiritual writings were approved by theologians on 3 February 1937, and his cause was officially opened on 19 February 1941, granting him the title of Servant of God.

In 1958 a miraculous healing of a Léonese woman (Justa Barrientos) was attributed to the intercession of Francisco Coll Guitart. This allowed for his beatification to take place on 29 April 1979 in a celebration over which Pope John Paul II presided. In 2008, a second miracle was accepted, leading to his canonisation in Saint Peter's Square in a celebration led by Pope Benedict XVI on 11 October 2009.

His liturgical feast is observed each 19 May – his date of baptism.
