= Molló =

- Municipality
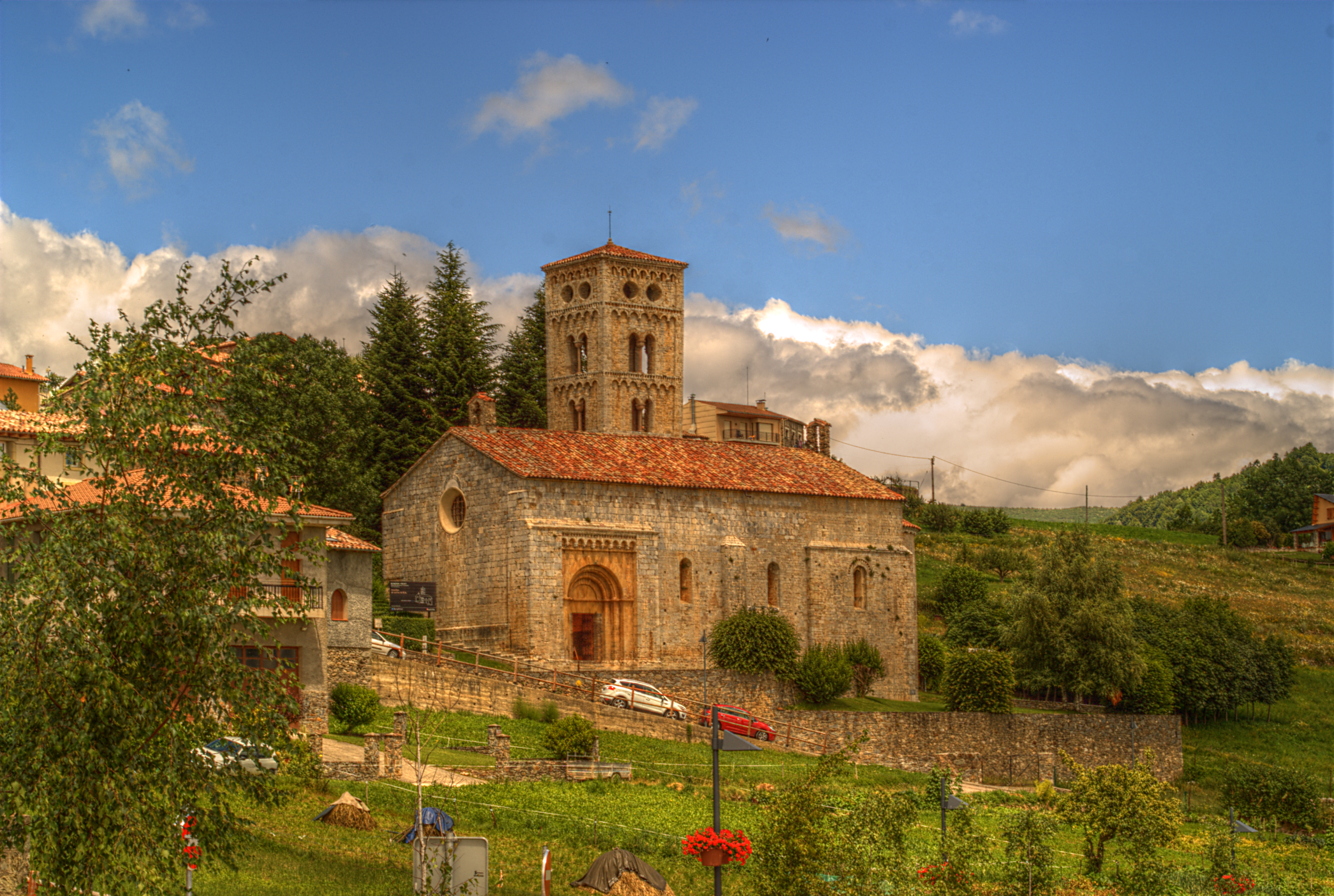
- St. Cecilia's church, Molló (12th century)

- Flag Coat of arms

- Location in Catalonia Molló (Spain)
- Coordinates: 42°21′N 2°24′E
- Country: Spain
- Community: Catalonia
- Province: Girona
- Comarca: Ripollès

Government
  - Mayor: Josep Coma Guitart (2015)

Area
  - Total: 43.1 km^{2} (16.6 sq mi)

Population (2025-01-01)
  - Total: 351
  - Density: 8.14/km^{2} (21.1/sq mi)
- Website: www.mollo.cat

Molló (Catalan pronunciation: [muˈʎo], Catalan for "milestone") is a town and municipality in the comarca of Ripollès in Girona, Catalonia, Spain, located in the Pyrenees, by the French border. Molló borders to the north with Prats de Molló (in Vallespir, France, connected by the Coll d'Ares pass of the Pyrenees), to the east and south with Camprodon, and to the west with Llanars and Setcases.
