= Pardines, Spain =

Pardines
- Municipality
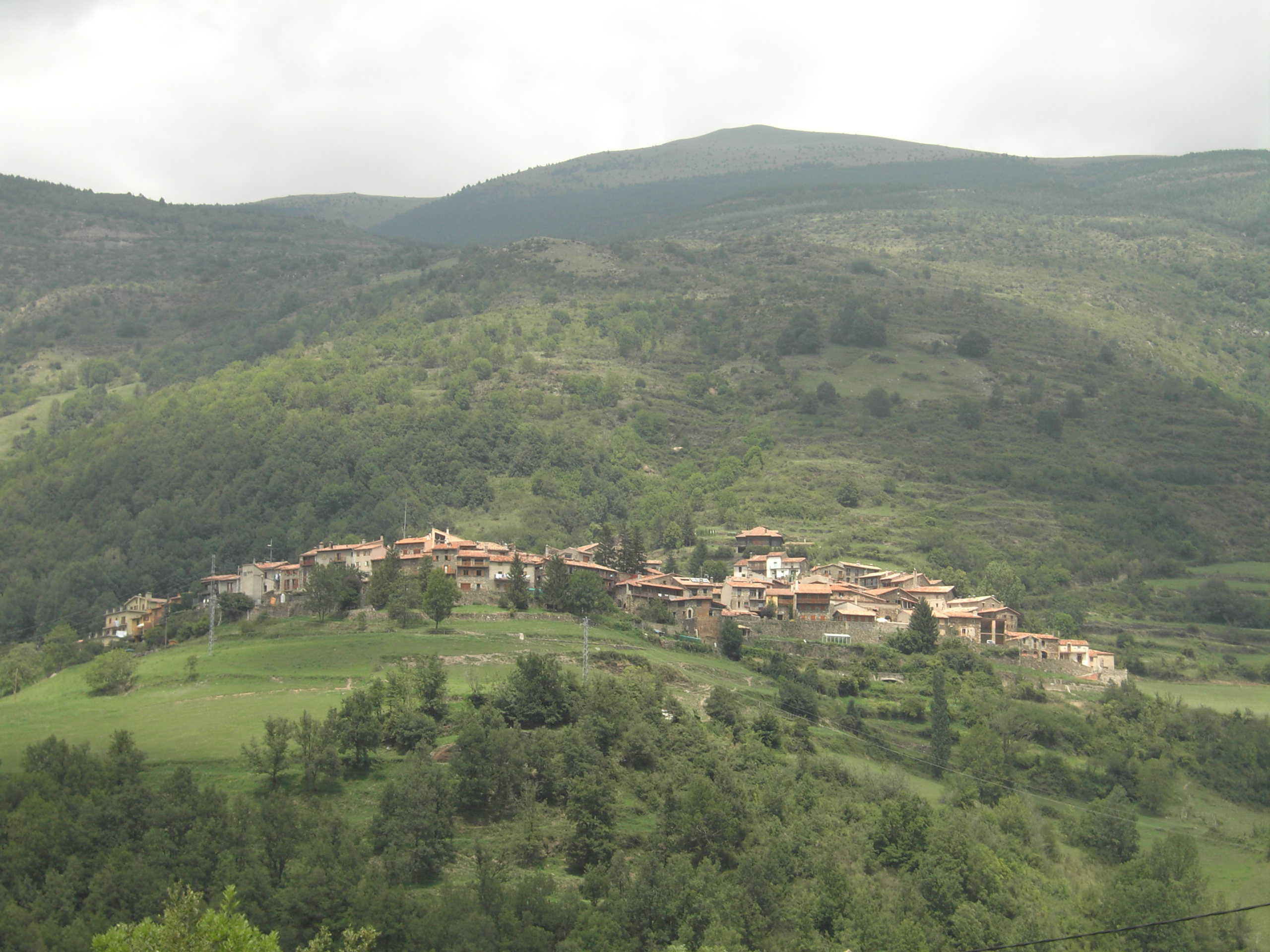

- Flag Coat of arms

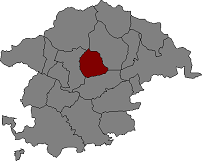
- Coordinates: 42°18′49″N 2°12′55″E
- Country: Spain
- Autonomous Community: Catalonia
- Province: Girona
- Comarca: Ripollès

Government
  - Mayor: Núria Pérez Desel (2015)

Area
  - Total: 31.0 km^{2} (12.0 sq mi)
- Elevation: 1,226 m (4,022 ft)

Population (2025-01-01)
  - Total: 168
  - Density: 5.42/km^{2} (14.0/sq mi)
- Postal code: 17
- Website: www.pardines.cat

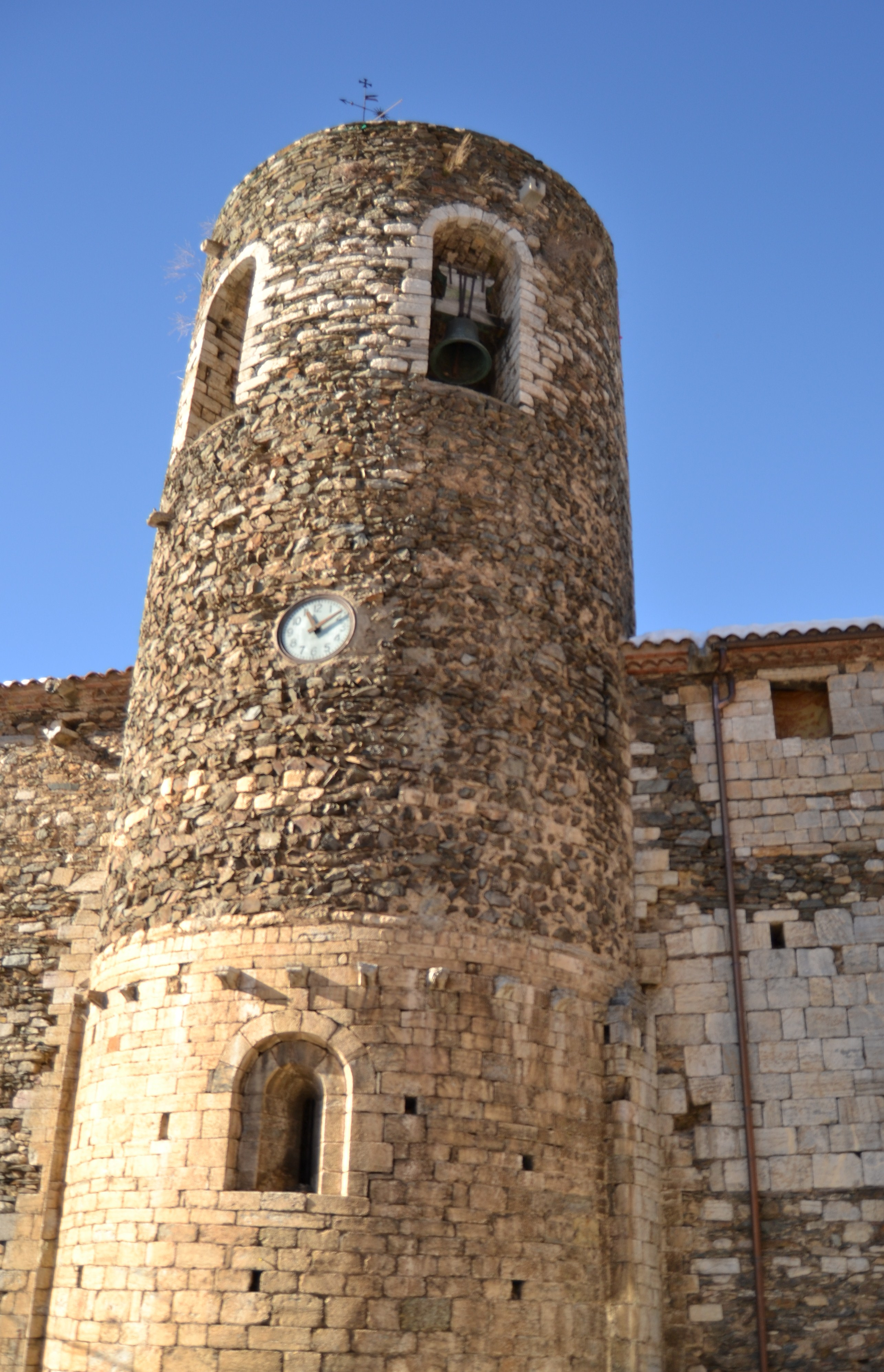
Sant Esteve

Pardines (Catalan pronunciation: [pəɾˈðinəs]) is a municipality in the comarca of Ripollès, province of Girona, Catalonia, Spain.

The highest point in the municipality is Puig Cerverís (2,202 m). The municipality is bordered on the north by Queralbs and Vilallonga de Ter, on the east and south by Ogassa, and on the west by Ribes de Freser and Queralbs.

== History ==
The name Pardines has its origins in the name parietinas, which means "building ruins." It is first documented in 839, in the act of consecration of Sant Ot d'Urgell. It was a possession of the counts of Cerdanya, the nobility of Sales, the monastery of Sant Martí de Canigó, and the counts of Barcelona.

== Demographic evolution ==
| 1900 | 1930 | 1950 | 1970 | 1981 | 1986 | 2006 |
|---|---|---|---|---|---|---|
| 476 | 448 | 357 | 193 | 130 | 118 | 149 |

== Sights ==
- Church of Santa Magdalena
- Church of Sant Esteve
- Chapel of Santa Magdalena
- Chapel of Sant Martí
- Chapel of the Roser
