= Fornells =

Fornells may refer to:

- Fornells, Menorca
- Fornells de Mar, beach and bay in the Costa Brava (zipcode 17255)
- Fornells de la Selva, suburb of Girona, 17458
- Fornells de Muntanya, hamlet near Planoles west of the Serra Cavallera, 17536
