= 2019 Volta a Catalunya =

Cycling race

2019 UCI World Tour, race 9 of 38

Race details
- Dates: 25–31 March 2019
- Stages: 7
- Distance: 1,159.3 km (720.4 mi)
- Winning time: 29h 14' 17"

Results
Jersey awarded to the overall winner	Winner	Miguel Ángel López (COL)	(Astana)
	Second	Adam Yates (GBR)	(Mitchelton–Scott)
	Third	Egan Bernal (COL)	(Team Sky)
Jersey awarded to the mountains classification winner	Mountains	Thomas De Gendt (BEL)	(Lotto–Soudal)
Jersey awarded to the youth classification winner	Youth	Miguel Ángel López (COL)	(Astana)
Jersey awarded to the sprints classification winner	Sprints	Michael Matthews (AUS)	(Team Sunweb)
	Team	Movistar Team	

The 2019 Volta a Catalunya was a road cycling stage race, that took place between 25 and 31 March 2019 in Spain. It was the 99th edition of Volta a Catalunya and the ninth race of the 2019 UCI World Tour. It was won by Miguel Ángel López of Astana.

== Teams ==
The 18 UCI WorldTeams were automatically invited to the race. In addition seven second-tier UCI Continental Circuits received a wildcard invitation to participate in the event.

The teams entering the race will be:

UCI WorldTeams

- AG2R La Mondiale
- Astana
- Bahrain–Merida
- Bora–Hansgrohe
- CCC Team
- EF Education First
- Team Dimension Data
- Groupama–FDJ
- Team Katusha–Alpecin
- Team Jumbo–Visma
- Lotto–Soudal
- Movistar Team
- Mitchelton–Scott
- Deceuninck–Quick-Step
- Team Sky
- Team Sunweb
- Trek–Segafredo
- UAE Team Emirates

UCI Professional Continental teams

- Caja Rural–Seguros RGA
- Cofidis
- Euskadi–Murias
- Roompot–Charles
- Arkéa–Samsic
- Wanty–Gobert
- Burgos BH

== Route ==
Stage schedule
Stage	Date	Route	Distance	Type	Winner
1	25 March	Calella to Calella	164 km (102 mi)	Medium-mountain stage	Thomas De Gendt (BEL)
2	26 March	Mataró to Sant Feliu de Guíxols	166.7 km (104 mi)	Flat stage	Michael Matthews (AUS)
3	27 March	Sant Feliu de Guíxols to Vallter 2000	179 km (111 mi)	Mountain stage	Adam Yates (GBR)
4	28 March	Llanars to La Molina	150.3 km (93 mi)	Mountain stage	Miguel Ángel López (COL)
5	29 March	Puigcerdà to Sant Cugat del Vallès	188.1 km (117 mi)	Flat stage	Maximilian Schachmann (GER)
6	30 March	Valls to Vila-seca	169.1 km (105 mi)	Hilly stage	Michael Matthews (AUS)
7	31 March	Barcelona to Barcelona	143.1 km (89 mi)	Hilly stage	Davide Formolo (ITA)

== Stages ==
=== Stage 1 ===
25 March 2019 — Calella to Calella, 164 km (102 mi)

Result of Stage 1
Rank	Rider	Team	Time
1	Thomas De Gendt (BEL)	Lotto–Soudal	4h 14' 32"
2	Maximilian Schachmann (GER)	Bora–Hansgrohe	+ 2' 38"
3	Grega Bole (SLO)	Bahrain–Merida	+ 2' 41"
4	Michael Matthews (AUS)	Team Sunweb	+ 2' 41"
5	Mikel Bizkarra (ESP)	Euskadi–Murias	+ 2' 41"
6	André Greipel (GER)	Arkéa–Samsic	+ 2' 41"
7	Daryl Impey (RSA)	Mitchelton–Scott	+ 2' 41"
8	Egan Bernal (COL)	Team Sky	+ 2' 41"
9	Jay McCarthy (AUS)	Bora–Hansgrohe	+ 2' 41"
10	Damiano Caruso (ITA)	Bahrain–Merida	+ 2' 41"

General classification after Stage 1
Rank	Rider	Team	Time
1	Thomas De Gendt (BEL)	Lotto–Soudal	4h 14' 16"
2	Maximilian Schachmann (GER)	Bora–Hansgrohe	+ 2' 48"
3	Grega Bole (SLO)	Bahrain–Merida	+ 2' 54"
4	Alejandro Valverde (ESP)	Movistar Team	+ 2' 56"
5	Egan Bernal (COL)	Team Sky	+ 2' 57"
6	Michael Matthews (AUS)	Team Sunweb	+ 2' 58"
7	Mikel Bizkarra (ESP)	Euskadi–Murias	+ 2' 58"
8	André Greipel (GER)	Arkéa–Samsic	+ 2' 58"
9	Daryl Impey (RSA)	Mitchelton–Scott	+ 2' 58"
10	Jay McCarthy (AUS)	Bora–Hansgrohe	+ 2' 58"

=== Stage 2 ===
26 March 2019 — Mataró to Sant Feliu de Guíxols, 166.7 km (104 mi)

Result of Stage 2
Rank	Rider	Team	Time
1	Michael Matthews (AUS)	Team Sunweb	4h 09' 34"
2	Alejandro Valverde (ESP)	Movistar Team	+ 0"
3	Daryl Impey (RSA)	Mitchelton–Scott	+ 0"
4	Maximilian Schachmann (GER)	Bora–Hansgrohe	+ 0"
5	Odd Christian Eiking (NOR)	Wanty–Gobert	+ 0"
6	James Knox (GBR)	Deceuninck–Quick-Step	+ 0"
7	Patrick Bevin (NZL)	CCC Team	+ 0"
8	Enrico Gasparotto (ITA)	Team Dimension Data	+ 0"
9	Davide Formolo (ITA)	Bora–Hansgrohe	+ 0"
10	Dan Martin (IRL)	UAE Team Emirates	+ 0"

General classification after Stage 2
Rank	Rider	Team	Time
1	Thomas De Gendt (BEL)	Lotto–Soudal	8h 23' 50"
2	Alejandro Valverde (ESP)	Movistar Team	+ 2' 47"
3	Michael Matthews (AUS)	Team Sunweb	+ 2' 48"
4	Maximilian Schachmann (GER)	Bora–Hansgrohe	+ 2' 48"
5	Daryl Impey (RSA)	Mitchelton–Scott	+ 2' 54"
6	Nairo Quintana (COL)	Movistar Team	+ 2' 56"
7	Egan Bernal (COL)	Team Sky	+ 2' 57"
8	Steven Kruijswijk (NED)	Team Jumbo–Visma	+ 2' 57"
9	Luis Ángel Maté (ESP)	Cofidis	+ 2' 57"
10	Patrick Bevin (NZL)	CCC Team	+ 2' 58"

=== Stage 3 ===
27 March 2019 — Sant Feliu de Guíxols to Vallter 2000, 179 km (111 mi)

Result of Stage 3
Rank	Rider	Team	Time
1	Adam Yates (GBR)	Mitchelton–Scott	5h 02' 18"
2	Egan Bernal (COL)	Team Sky	+ 0"
3	Dan Martin (IRL)	UAE Team Emirates	+ 0"
4	Nairo Quintana (COL)	Movistar Team	+ 0"
5	Miguel Ángel López (COL)	Astana	+ 2"
6	Steven Kruijswijk (NED)	Team Jumbo–Visma	+ 30"
7	Ilnur Zakarin (RUS)	Team Katusha–Alpecin	+ 46"
8	Richard Carapaz (ECU)	Movistar Team	+ 46"
9	Wilco Kelderman (NED)	Team Sunweb	+ 51"
10	Michael Woods (CAN)	EF Education First	+ 53"

General classification after Stage 3
Rank	Rider	Team	Time
1	Thomas De Gendt (BEL)	Lotto–Soudal	13h 28' 29"
2	Adam Yates (GBR)	Mitchelton–Scott	+ 27"
3	Egan Bernal (COL)	Team Sky	+ 30"
4	Dan Martin (IRL)	UAE Team Emirates	+ 33"
5	Nairo Quintana (COL)	Movistar Team	+ 35"
6	Miguel Ángel López (COL)	Astana	+ 39"
7	Steven Kruijswijk (NED)	Team Jumbo–Visma	+ 1' 06"
8	Ilnur Zakarin (RUS)	Team Katusha–Alpecin	+ 1' 23"
9	Richard Carapaz (ECU)	Movistar Team	+ 1' 23"
10	Wilco Kelderman (NED)	Team Sunweb	+ 1' 28"

=== Stage 4 ===
28 March 2019 — Llanars to La Molina, 150.3 km (93 mi)

Result of Stage 4
Rank	Rider	Team	Time
1	Miguel Ángel López (COL)	Astana	4h 02' 07"
2	Gregor Mühlberger (AUT)	Bora–Hansgrohe	+ 16"
3	Marc Soler (ESP)	Movistar Team	+ 16"
4	Egan Bernal (COL)	Team Sky	+ 16"
5	Adam Yates (GBR)	Mitchelton–Scott	+ 16"
6	Nairo Quintana (COL)	Movistar Team	+ 19"
7	Steven Kruijswijk (NED)	Team Jumbo–Visma	+ 19"
8	Guillaume Martin (FRA)	Wanty–Gobert	+ 32"
9	Michael Woods (CAN)	EF Education First	+ 34"
10	Rafał Majka (POL)	Bora–Hansgrohe	+ 42"

General classification after Stage 4
Rank	Rider	Team	Time
1	Miguel Ángel López (COL)	Astana	17h 31' 05"
2	Adam Yates (GBR)	Mitchelton–Scott	+ 14"
3	Egan Bernal (COL)	Team Sky	+ 17"
4	Nairo Quintana (COL)	Movistar Team	+ 25"
5	Dan Martin (IRL)	UAE Team Emirates	+ 46"
6	Steven Kruijswijk (NED)	Team Jumbo–Visma	+ 56"
7	Michael Woods (CAN)	EF Education First	+ 1' 42"
8	Romain Bardet (FRA)	AG2R La Mondiale	+ 1' 44"
9	Rafał Majka (POL)	Bora–Hansgrohe	+ 2' 27"
10	Marc Soler (ESP)	Movistar Team	+ 2' 36"

=== Stage 5 ===
29 March 2019 — Puigcerdà to Sant Cugat del Vallès, 188.1 km (117 mi)

Result of Stage 5
Rank	Rider	Team	Time
1	Maximilian Schachmann (GER)	Bora–Hansgrohe	4h 25' 45"
2	Michael Matthews (AUS)	Team Sunweb	+ 13"
3	Ryan Gibbons (RSA)	Team Dimension Data	+ 13"
4	Daryl Impey (RSA)	Mitchelton–Scott	+ 13"
5	Patrick Bevin (NZL)	CCC Team	+ 13"
6	Phil Bauhaus (GER)	Bahrain–Merida	+ 13"
7	Jay McCarthy (AUS)	Bora–Hansgrohe	+ 13"
8	Nairo Quintana (COL)	Movistar Team	+ 13"
9	Bjorg Lambrecht (BEL)	Lotto–Soudal	+ 13"
10	Miguel Ángel López (COL)	Astana	+ 13"

General classification after Stage 5
Rank	Rider	Team	Time
1	Miguel Ángel López (COL)	Astana	21h 57' 05"
2	Adam Yates (GBR)	Mitchelton–Scott	+ 14"
3	Egan Bernal (COL)	Team Sky	+ 17"
4	Nairo Quintana (COL)	Movistar Team	+ 25"
5	Dan Martin (IRL)	UAE Team Emirates	+ 46"
6	Steven Kruijswijk (NED)	Team Jumbo–Visma	+ 56"
7	Michael Woods (CAN)	EF Education First	+ 1' 42"
8	Romain Bardet (FRA)	AG2R La Mondiale	+ 1' 44"
9	Rafał Majka (POL)	Bora–Hansgrohe	+ 2' 27"
10	Marc Soler (ESP)	Movistar Team	+ 2' 36"

=== Stage 6 ===
30 March 2019 — Valls to Vila-Seca, 169.1 km (105 mi)

Result of Stage 6
Rank	Rider	Team	Time
1	Michael Matthews (AUS)	Team Sunweb	3h 56' 36"
2	Phil Bauhaus (GER)	Bahrain–Merida	+ 0"
3	Daryl Impey (RSA)	Mitchelton–Scott	+ 0"
4	Patrick Bevin (NZL)	CCC Team	+ 0"
5	Mikel Aristi (ESP)	Euskadi–Murias	+ 0"
6	Hugo Hofstetter (FRA)	Cofidis	+ 0"
7	Ryan Gibbons (RSA)	Team Dimension Data	+ 0"
8	Miguel Ángel López (COL)	Astana	+ 0"
9	Rafał Majka (POL)	Bora–Hansgrohe	+ 0"
10	Enric Mas (ESP)	Deceuninck–Quick-Step	+ 0"

General classification after Stage 6
Rank	Rider	Team	Time
1	Miguel Ángel López (COL)	Astana	25h 53' 41"
2	Adam Yates (GBR)	Mitchelton–Scott	+ 14"
3	Egan Bernal (COL)	Team Sky	+ 17"
4	Nairo Quintana (COL)	Movistar Team	+ 25"
5	Dan Martin (IRL)	UAE Team Emirates	+ 46"
6	Steven Kruijswijk (NED)	Team Jumbo–Visma	+ 56"
7	Michael Woods (CAN)	EF Education First	+ 1' 42"
8	Romain Bardet (FRA)	AG2R La Mondiale	+ 1' 44"
9	Rafał Majka (POL)	Bora–Hansgrohe	+ 2' 27"
10	Marc Soler (ESP)	Movistar Team	+ 2' 36"

=== Stage 7 ===
31 March 2019 — Barcelona to Barcelona, 143.1 km (89 mi)

Result of Stage 7
Rank	Rider	Team	Time
1	Davide Formolo (ITA)	Bora–Hansgrohe	3h 19' 41"
2	Enric Mas (ESP)	Deceuninck–Quick-Step	+ 51"
3	Maximilian Schachmann (GER)	Bora–Hansgrohe	+ 53"
4	Dion Smith (NZL)	Mitchelton–Scott	+ 55"
5	Alejandro Valverde (ESP)	Movistar Team	+ 55"
6	Egan Bernal (COL)	Team Sky	+ 55"
7	Adam Yates (GBR)	Mitchelton–Scott	+ 55"
8	Nairo Quintana (COL)	Movistar Team	+ 55"
9	Steven Kruijswijk (NED)	Team Jumbo–Visma	+ 55"
10	Michael Woods (CAN)	EF Education First	+ 55"

Final general classification
Rank	Rider	Team	Time
1	Miguel Ángel López (COL)	Astana	29h 14' 17"
2	Adam Yates (GBR)	Mitchelton–Scott	+ 14"
3	Egan Bernal (COL)	Team Sky	+ 17"
4	Nairo Quintana (COL)	Movistar Team	+ 25"
5	Steven Kruijswijk (NED)	Team Jumbo–Visma	+ 56"
6	Michael Woods (CAN)	EF Education First	+ 1' 42"
7	Rafał Majka (POL)	Bora–Hansgrohe	+ 2' 27"
8	Guillaume Martin (FRA)	Wanty–Gobert	+ 2' 41"
9	Enric Mas (ESP)	Deceuninck–Quick-Step	+ 2' 49"
10	Alejandro Valverde (ESP)	Movistar Team	+ 3' 02"

== Classification leadership table ==
Stage	Winner	General classification	Mountains classification	Sprints classification	Young rider classification	Teams classification
1	Thomas De Gendt	Thomas De Gendt	Thomas De Gendt	Thomas De Gendt	Maximilian Schachmann	Lotto–Soudal
2	Michael Matthews	Thomas De Gendt	Thomas De Gendt	Thomas De Gendt	Maximilian Schachmann	Lotto–Soudal
3	Adam Yates	Thomas De Gendt	Thomas De Gendt	Thomas De Gendt	Egan Bernal	Movistar Team
4	Miguel Ángel López	Miguel Ángel López	Thomas De Gendt	Thomas De Gendt	Miguel Ángel López	Movistar Team
5	Maximilian Schachmann	Miguel Ángel López	Thomas De Gendt	Maximilian Schachmann	Miguel Ángel López	Movistar Team
6	Michael Matthews	Miguel Ángel López	Thomas De Gendt	Michael Matthews	Miguel Ángel López	Movistar Team
7	Davide Formolo	Miguel Ángel López	Thomas De Gendt	Michael Matthews	Miguel Ángel López	Movistar Team
Final		Miguel Ángel López	Thomas De Gendt	Michael Matthews	Miguel Ángel López	Movistar Team

== Final classification standings ==
Legend
Denotes the winner of the general classification	Denotes the winner of the mountains classification
Denotes the winner of the points classification	Denotes the winner of the young rider classification

=== General classification ===
Final general classification
Rank	Rider	Team	Time
1	Miguel Ángel López (COL)	Astana	29h 14' 17"
2	Adam Yates (GBR)	Mitchelton–Scott	+ 14"
3	Egan Bernal (COL)	Team Sky	+ 17"
4	Nairo Quintana (COL)	Movistar Team	+ 25"
5	Steven Kruijswijk (NED)	Team Jumbo–Visma	+ 56"
6	Michael Woods (CAN)	EF Education First	+ 1' 42"
7	Rafał Majka (POL)	Bora–Hansgrohe	+ 2' 27"
8	Guillaume Martin (FRA)	Wanty–Gobert	+ 2' 41"
9	Enric Mas (ESP)	Deceuninck–Quick-Step	+ 2' 49"
10	Alejandro Valverde (ESP)	Movistar Team	+ 3' 02"

=== Points classification ===
Final points classification
Rank	Rider	Team	Points
1	Michael Matthews (AUS)	Team Sunweb	29
2	Maximilian Schachmann (GER)	Bora–Hansgrohe	28
3	Thomas De Gendt (BEL)	Lotto–Soudal	16
4	Davide Formolo (ITA)	Bora–Hansgrohe	13
5	Alejandro Valverde (ESP)	Movistar Team	11
6	Miguel Ángel López (COL)	Astana	10
7	Adam Yates (GBR)	Mitchelton–Scott	10
8	Gregor Mühlberger (AUT)	Bora–Hansgrohe	8
9	Daryl Impey (RSA)	Mitchelton–Scott	8
10	Egan Bernal (COL)	Team Sky	7

=== Mountains classification ===
Final mountains classification
Rank	Rider	Team	Points
1	Thomas De Gendt (BEL)	Lotto–Soudal	60
2	Carlos Verona (ESP)	Movistar Team	41
3	Gregor Mühlberger (AUT)	Bora–Hansgrohe	40
4	Adam Yates (GBR)	Mitchelton–Scott	34
5	Egan Bernal (COL)	Team Sky	25
6	Luis Ángel Maté (ESP)	Cofidis	24
7	Pieter Weening (NED)	Roompot–Charles	24
8	Miguel Ángel López (COL)	Astana	22
9	Patrick Bevin (NZL)	CCC Team	21
10	Davide Formolo (ITA)	Bora–Hansgrohe	18

=== Young rider classification ===
Final young rider classification
Rank	Rider	Team	Time
1	Miguel Ángel López (COL)	Astana	29h 14' 17"
2	Egan Bernal (COL)	Team Sky	+ 17"
3	Enric Mas (ESP)	Deceuninck–Quick-Step	+ 2' 49"
4	Maximilian Schachmann (GER)	Bora–Hansgrohe	+ 3' 15"
5	Odd Christian Eiking (NOR)	Wanty–Gobert	+ 7' 07"
6	James Knox (GBR)	Deceuninck–Quick-Step	+ 13' 55"
7	Merhawi Kudus (ERI)	Astana	+ 15' 57"
8	Giulio Ciccone (ITA)	Trek–Segafredo	+ 17' 20"
9	Pavel Sivakov (RUS)	Team Sky	+ 18' 19"
10	Gregor Mühlberger (AUT)	Bora–Hansgrohe	+ 24' 58"

=== Teams classification ===
Final teams classification
Rank	Team	Time
1	Movistar Team	87h 49' 11"
2	Bora–Hansgrohe	+ 5' 13"
3	Astana	+ 10' 12"
4	Wanty–Gobert	+ 16' 39"
5	Mitchelton–Scott	+ 16' 42"
6	EF Education First	+ 23' 07"
7	Team Sky	+ 30' 12"
8	Euskadi–Murias	+ 33' 55"
9	Cofidis	+ 34' 48"
10	AG2R La Mondiale	+ 35' 41"
