= Cim de Pla de Pujalts =

Mountain of Catalonia, Spain

Coordinates: 42°17′09″N 2°04′51″E

Cim de Plà de Pujalts
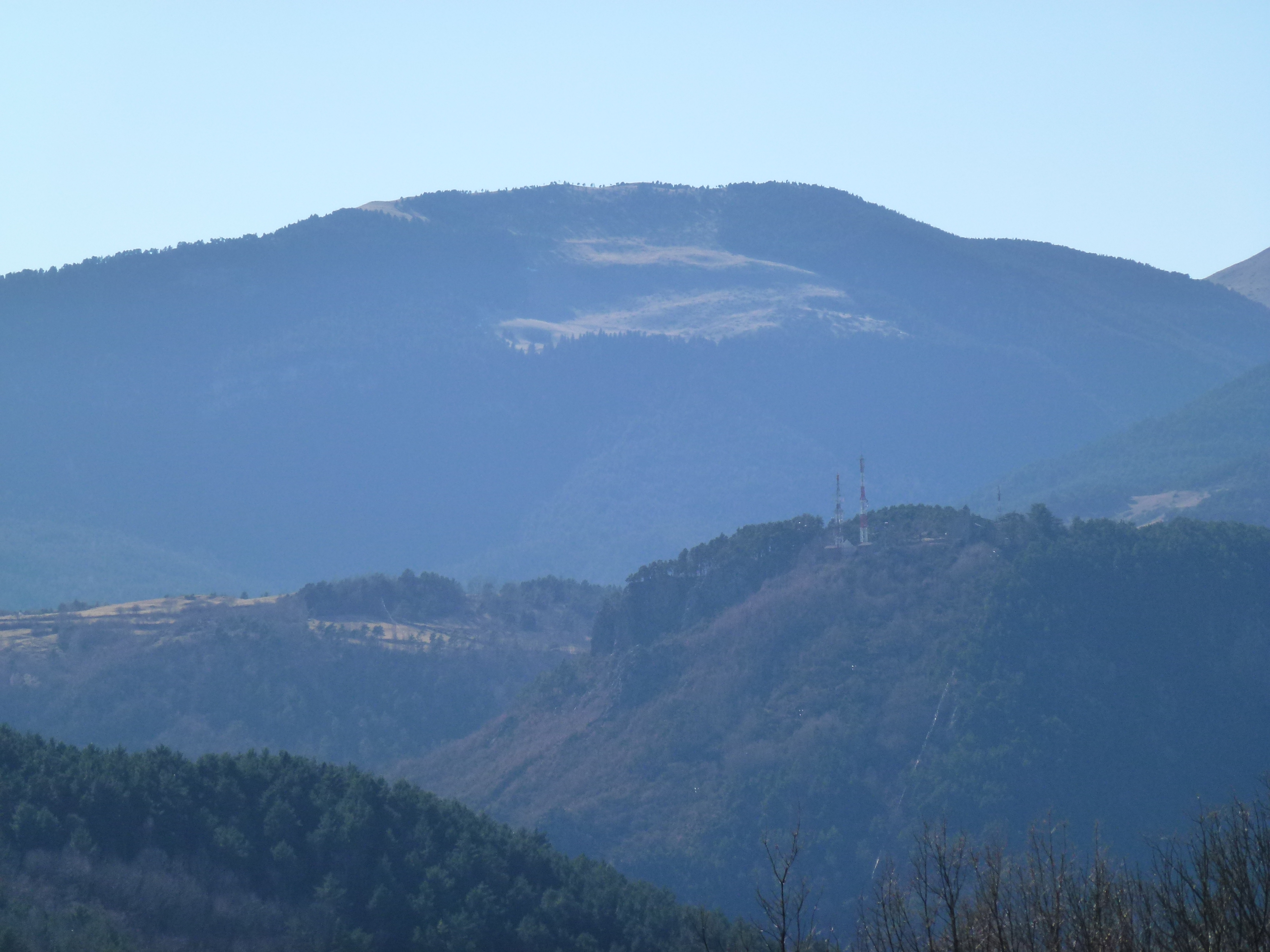

Highest point
- Elevation: 2,056 m (6,745 ft)

Geography
- Location: Gombrèn, Catalonia, Spain

Cim de Plà de Pujalts is a mountain of Catalonia, Spain. It has an elevation of 2,056 metres above sea level.

== See also ==
- Mountains of Catalonia
