= Pic de Noufonts =

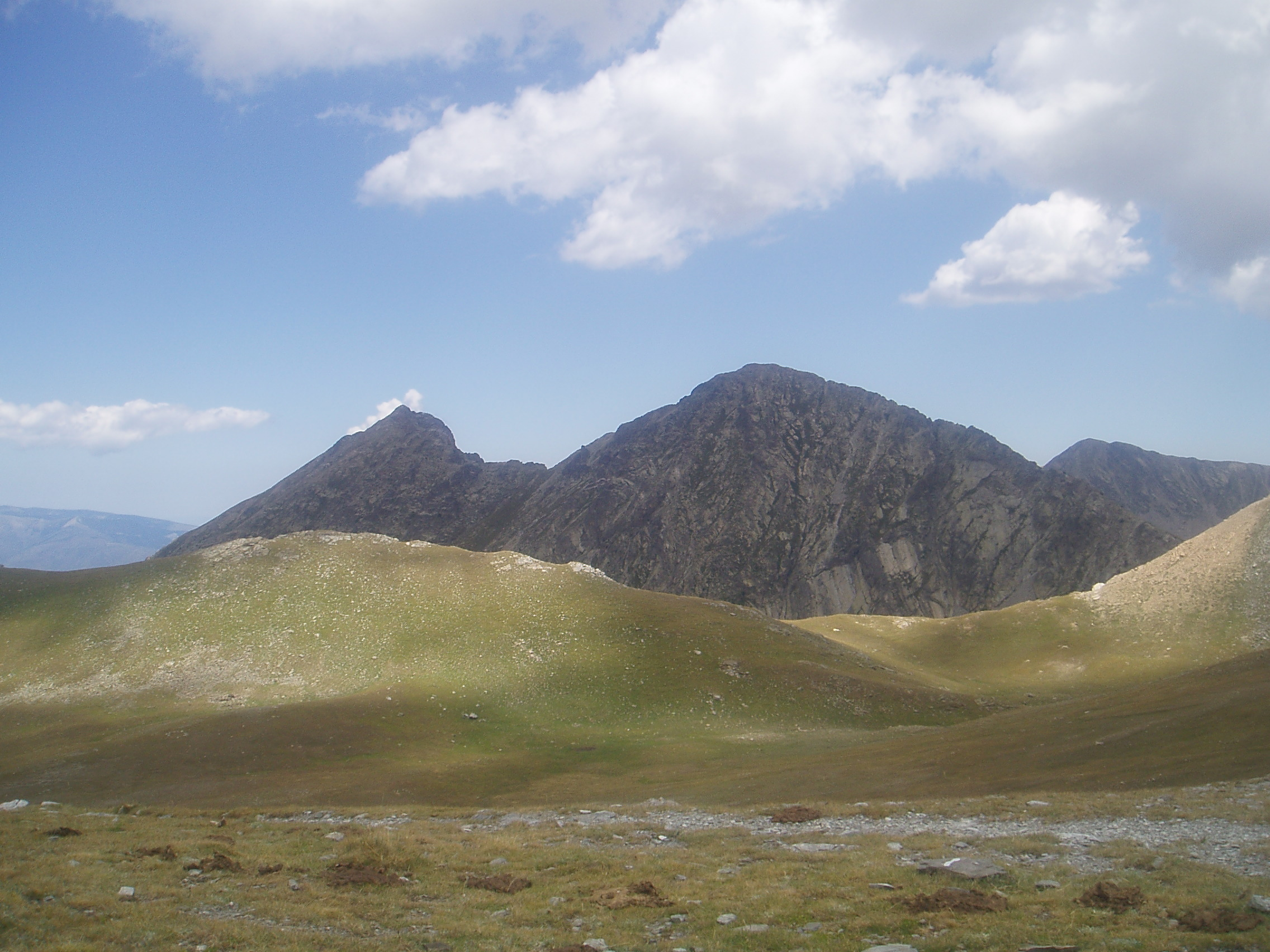

Highest point
- Elevation: 2,851 m (9,354 ft)
- Prominence: 210 m (690 ft)
- Listing: Mountains of Catalonia
- Coordinates: 42°25′29.38″N 2°10′3.79″E

Geography
- Location within Pyrenees
- Location: Queralbs (Ripollès); Fontpedrosa (Conflent) Catalonia
- Parent range: Pyrenees

Climbing
- First ascent: Unknown
- Easiest route: From Vall de Núria

Pic de Noufonts is a mountain of Catalonia. Located in the Pyrenees, in the border between France and Spain, it has an elevation of 2,851 metres (9,354 ft) above sea level.
