= Vallfogona de Ripollès =

- Municipality
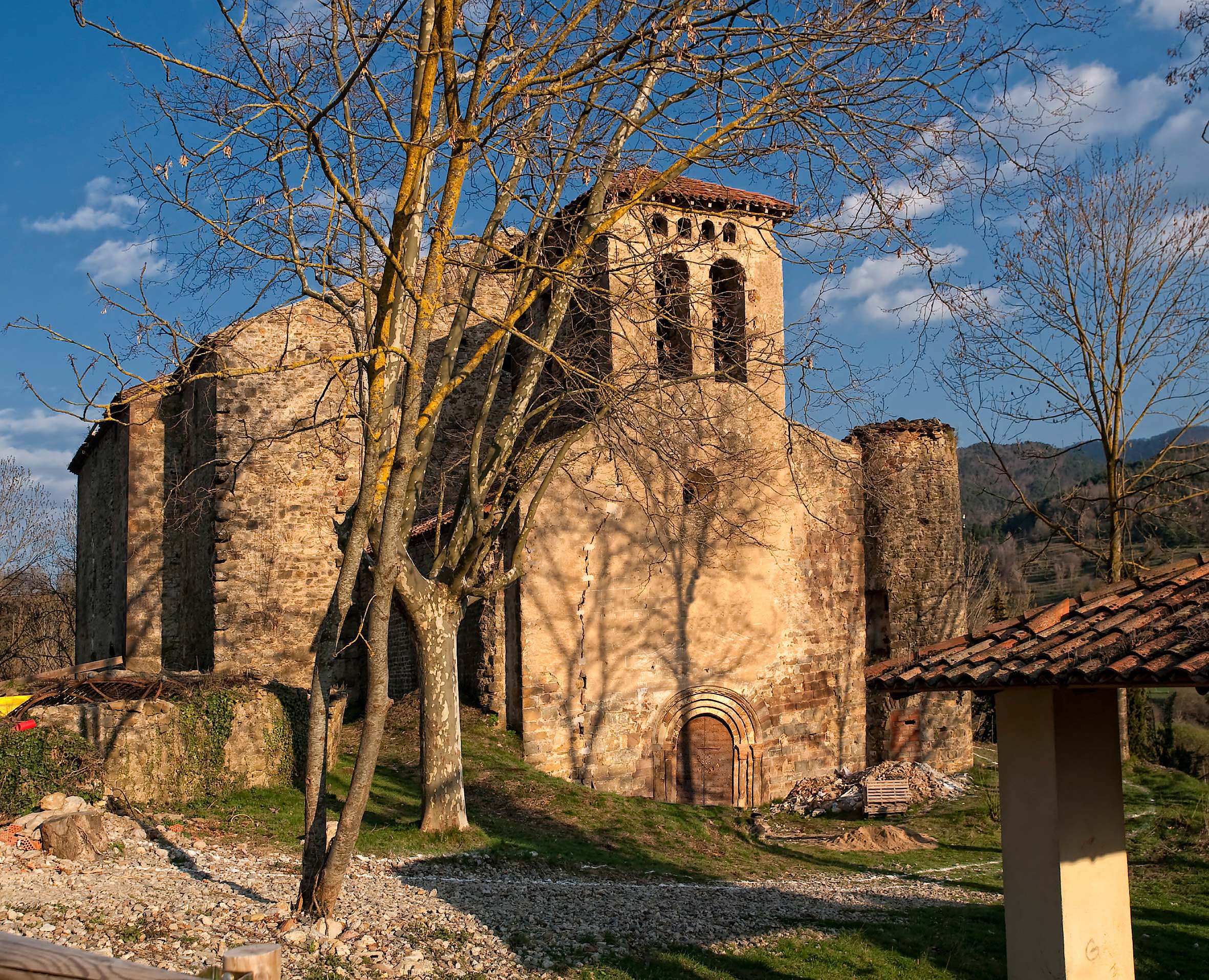
- St. Julian's church, Vallfogona (12-18th century)

- Flag Coat of arms

- Location in Catalonia Vallfogona de Ripollès (Spain)
- Coordinates: 42°11′55″N 2°18′13″E
- Country: Spain
- Community: Catalonia
- Province: Girona
- Comarca: Ripollès

Government
  - Mayor: Maria Carme Freixa Bosch (2015)

Area
  - Total: 39.2 km^{2} (15.1 sq mi)

Population (2025-01-01)
  - Total: 225
  - Density: 5.74/km^{2} (14.9/sq mi)
- Website: www.vallfogona.cat

Vallfogona de Ripollès (Catalan pronunciation: [ˌbaʎfuˈɣonə ðə ripuˈʎɛs]) is a village in the province of Girona and autonomous community of Catalonia, Spain.
