= Campdevànol =

- Municipality
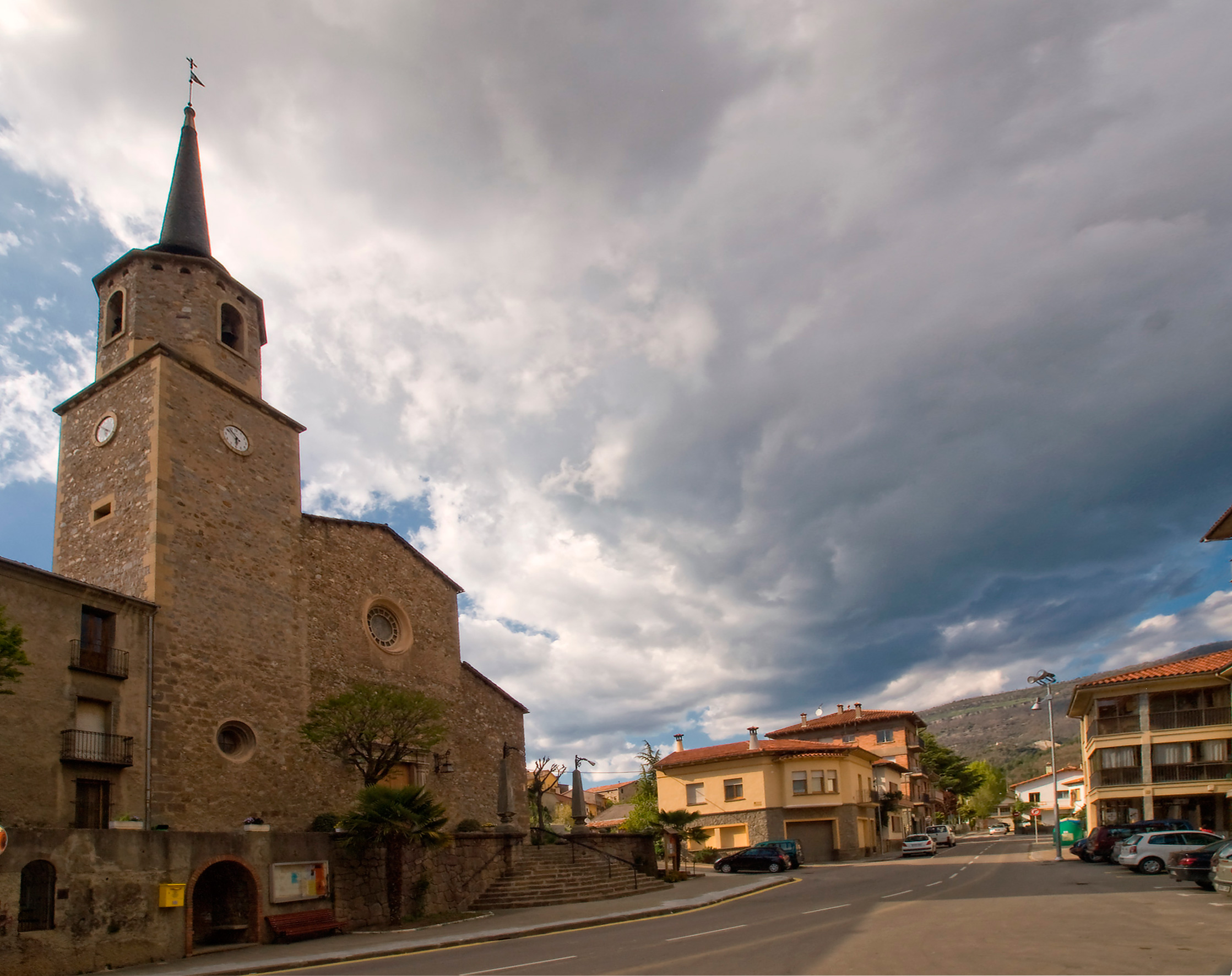
- Campdevànol parish church

- Coat of arms

- Location in Catalonia Campdevànol (Spain)
- Coordinates: 42°13′N 2°10′E
- Country: Spain
- Community: Catalonia
- Province: Girona
- Comarca: Ripollès

Government
  - Mayor: Joan Manso Bosoms (2015)

Area
  - Total: 32.6 km^{2} (12.6 sq mi)

Population (2025-01-01)
  - Total: 3,241
  - Density: 99.4/km^{2} (257/sq mi)
- Website: www.campdevanol.org

Campdevànol (Catalan pronunciation: [ˌkamdəˈβanul]) is a village in the province of Girona and autonomous community of Catalonia, Spain. The municipality covers an area of 32.62 square kilometres (12.59 sq mi) and the population in 2014 was 3,395.
