= Les Llosses =

- Municipality
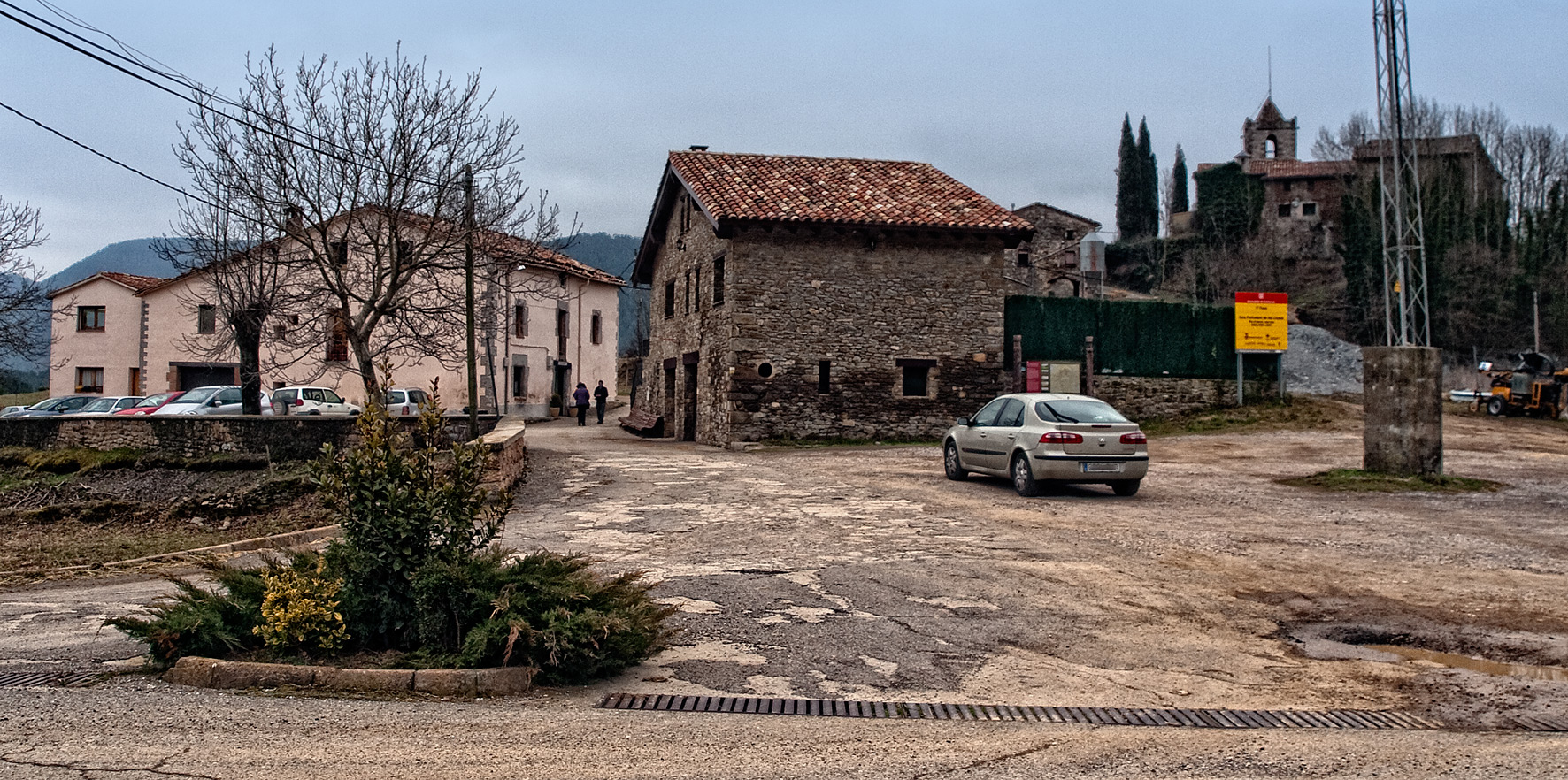
- Santa Maria de Matamala

- Flag Coat of arms

- Location in Catalonia Les Llosses (Catalonia) Les Llosses (Spain)
- Coordinates: 42°9′7″N 2°7′6″E
- Country: Spain
- Community: Catalonia
- Province: Girona
- Comarca: Ripollès

Government
  - Mayor: David Serrat Soldevila (2015)

Area
  - Total: 114.0 km^{2} (44.0 sq mi)

Population (2025-01-01)
  - Total: 197
  - Density: 1.73/km^{2} (4.48/sq mi)
- Website: www.lesllosses.cat

Les Llosses (Catalan pronunciation: [ləz ˈʎɔsəs]) is a village in the province of Girona and autonomous community of Catalonia, Spain. The municipality covers an area of 114 square kilometres (44 sq mi) and the population in 2014 was 211. It includes an exclave within Borredà.
