= Borredà =

- Municipality
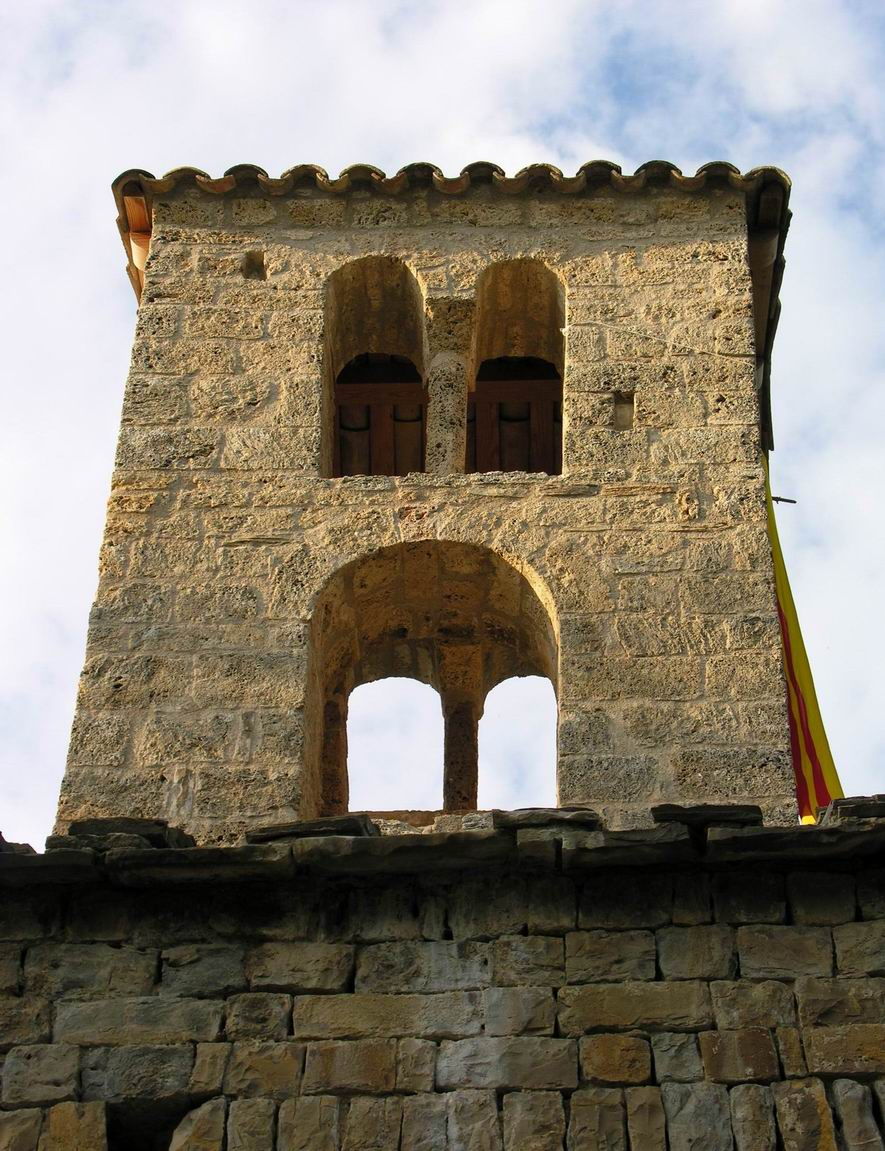
- Belfry of Sant Sadurní de Rotgers

- Coat of arms

- Location in Berguedà

- Location in Catalonia Borredà (Spain)
- Coordinates: 42°8′17″N 1°59′46″E
- Country: Spain
- Community: Catalonia
- Province: Barcelona
- Comarca: Berguedà

Government
  - Mayor: Joan Roma Cunill (2015) (CP)

Area
  - Total: 43.4 km^{2} (16.8 sq mi)
- Elevation: 854 m (2,802 ft)

Population (2025-01-01)
  - Total: 433
  - Density: 9.98/km^{2} (25.8/sq mi)
- Demonym(s): Borredanès, borredanesa
- Website: borreda.net

Borredà (Catalan pronunciation: [burəˈða]) is a municipality in the comarca of the Berguedà in Catalonia, Spain. It is situated in the upper valley of the Margençol river in the east of the comarca. There are several notable houses from the 17th and 18th centuries. The Romanesque church of Sant Sadurní de Rotgers, a protected historico-artistic monument, can be reached by a mountain track. The village is served by the C-149 road between Berga and Sant Quirze de Besora. The municipality surrounds an exclave of Les Llosses.

== Demography ==
1900	1930	1950	1970	1986	2007
837	1090	863	597	445	571
