= Toses =

- Municipality
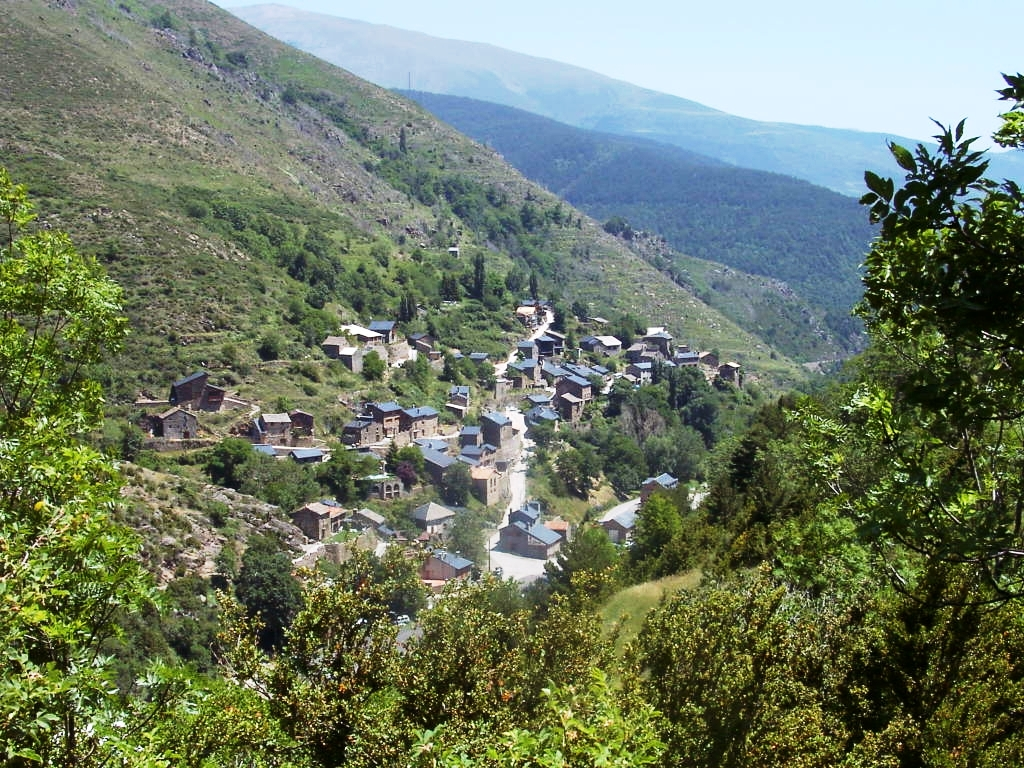
- Toses, Vall de Ribes

- Flag Coat of arms

- Location in Catalonia Toses (Spain)
- Coordinates: 42°19′24″N 2°1′0″E
- Country: Spain
- Community: Catalonia
- Province: Girona
- Comarca: Ripollès

Government
  - Mayor: Joan Bernadas Rosell (2015)

Area
  - Total: 57.9 km^{2} (22.4 sq mi)

Population (2025-01-01)
  - Total: 198
  - Density: 3.42/km^{2} (8.86/sq mi)
- Website: www.toses.cat

Toses (Catalan pronunciation: [ˈtɔzəs]) is a small village in the county of Ripollès in the province of Girona and autonomous community of Catalonia, Spain. It is furthermore the name of the municipality of Toses which, in addition to the village of Toses, comprises the villages of Fornells, Dòrria and Nevà.

The R3 railway service from Barcelona to the French border has a stop in the village.
