= Ogassa =

- Municipality
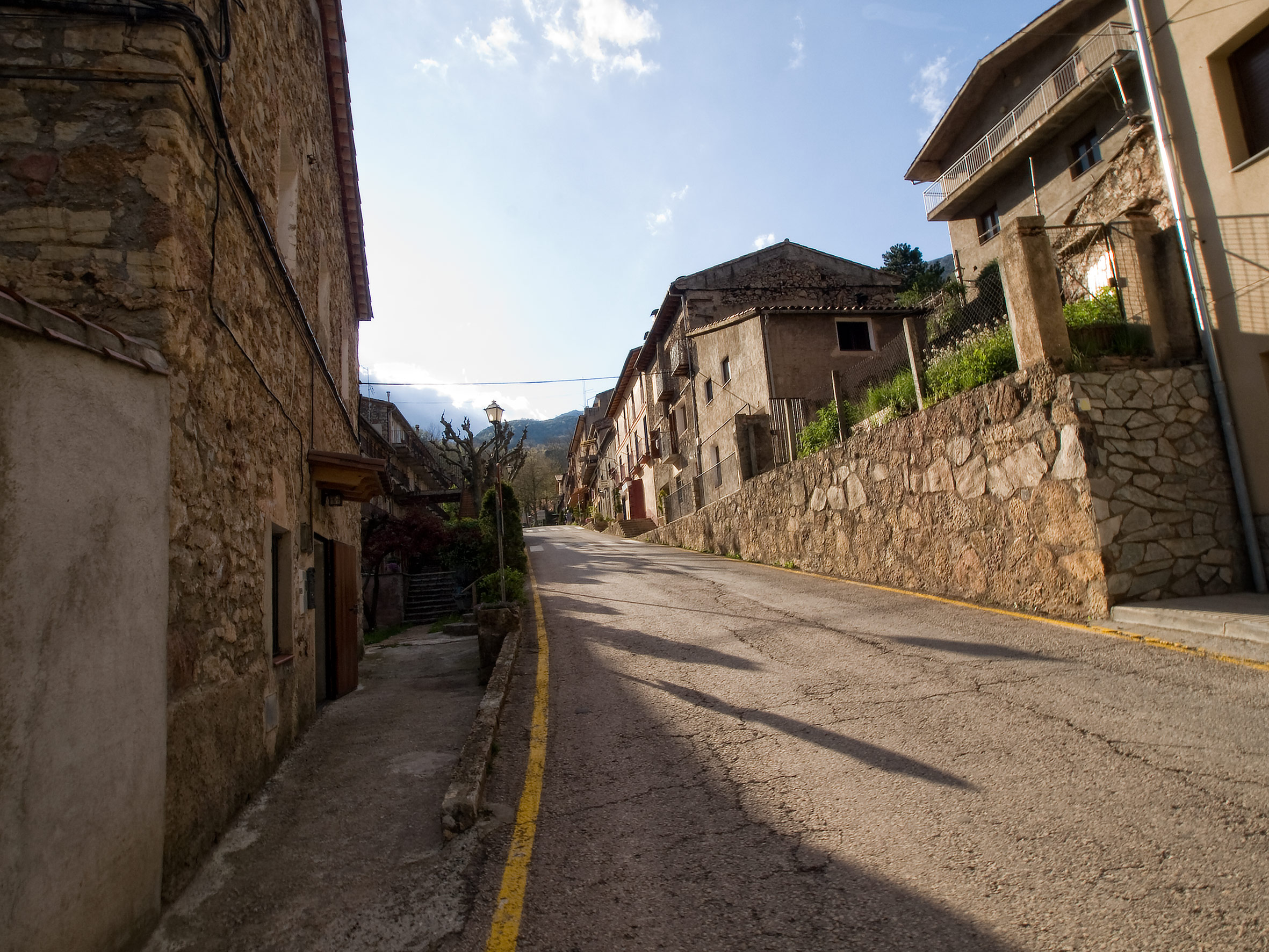
- Ogassa

- Flag Coat of arms

- Location in Catalonia Ogassa (Spain)
- Coordinates: 42.266°N 2.278°E
- Country: Spain
- Community: Catalonia
- Province: Girona
- Comarca: Ripollès

Government
  - Mayor: Josep Tremps Bosch (2015)

Area
  - Total: 45.2 km^{2} (17.5 sq mi)

Population (2025-01-01)
  - Total: 222
  - Density: 4.91/km^{2} (12.7/sq mi)
- Website: webspobles2.ddgi.cat/ogassa

Ogassa (Catalan pronunciation: [uˈɣasə]) is a village in the province of Girona and autonomous community of Catalonia, Spain. The municipality covers an area of 45.2 square kilometres (17.5 sq mi) and the population in 2014 was 245.
