= Campelles =

- Municipality
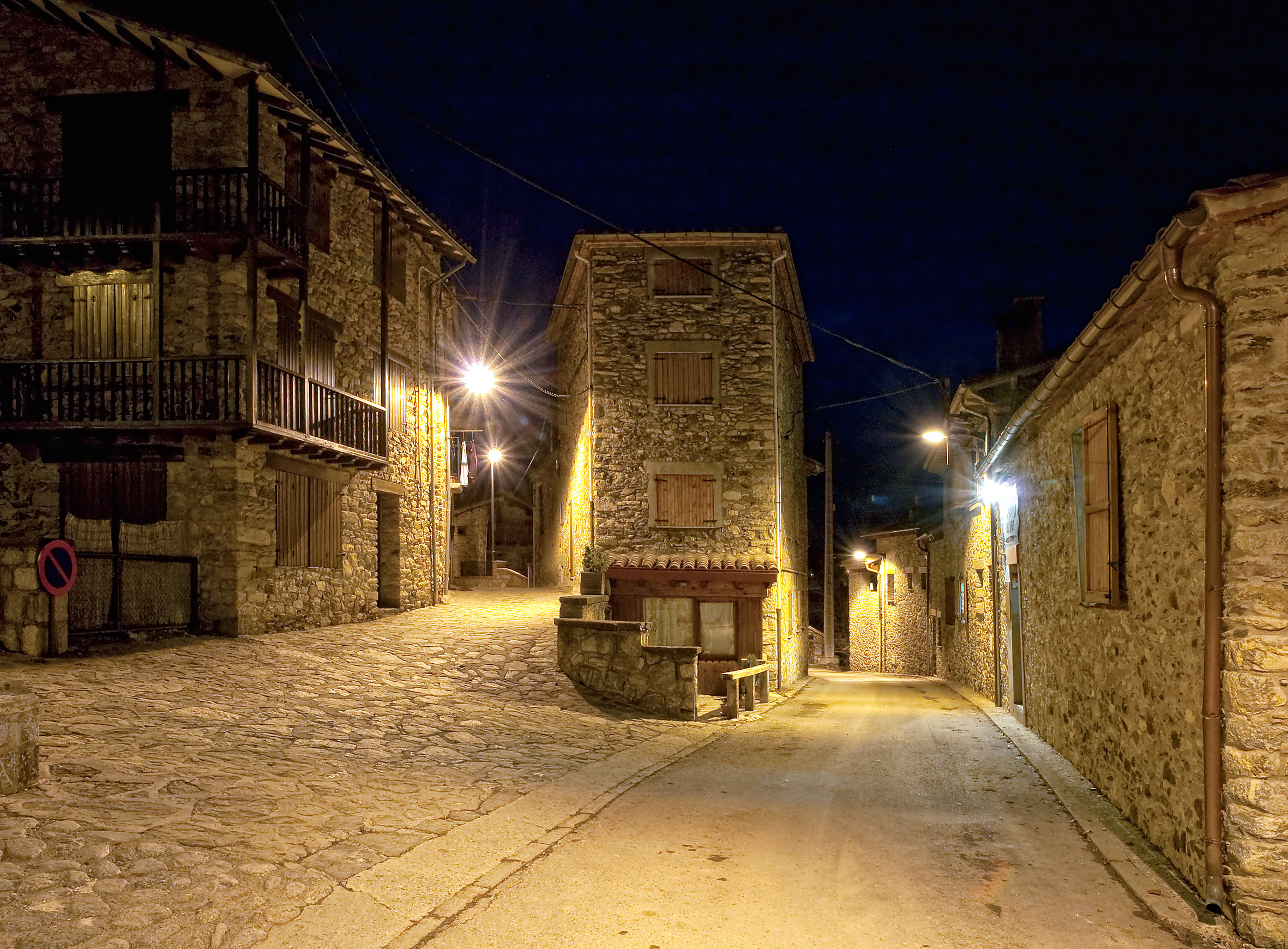
- Campelles

- Flag Coat of arms

- Location in Catalonia Campelles (Spain)
- Coordinates: 42°17′49″N 2°8′28″E
- Country: Spain
- Community: Catalonia
- Province: Girona
- Comarca: Ripollès

Government
  - Mayor: Joan Dordas Riu (2015)

Area
  - Total: 18.6 km^{2} (7.2 sq mi)

Population (2025-01-01)
  - Total: 163
  - Density: 8.76/km^{2} (22.7/sq mi)
- Website: campelles.cat

Campelles (Catalan pronunciation: [kəmˈpɛʎəs]; locally [kəmˈpɛjəs]) is a village in the province of Girona and autonomous community of Catalonia, Spain. The municipality covers an area of 18.6 square kilometres (7.2 sq mi) and the population in 2014 was 132.
