= Ribes de Freser =

- Municipality
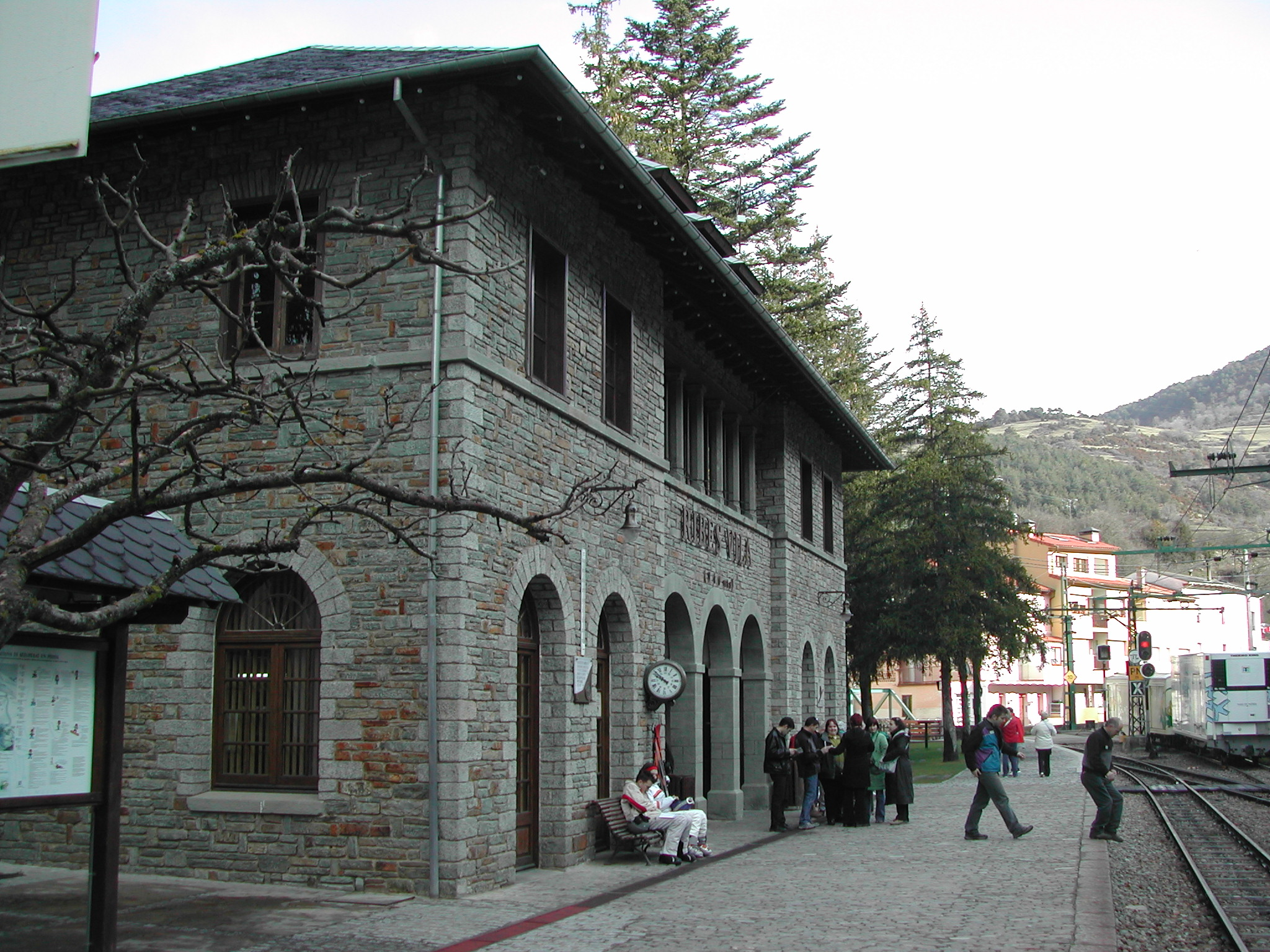

- Coat of arms

- Location in Catalonia Ribes de Freser (Spain)
- Coordinates: 42°18′34″N 2°10′17″E
- Country: Spain
- Community: Catalonia
- Province: Girona
- Comarca: Ripollès

Government
  - Mayor: Marc Prat Arrey (2015)

Area
  - Total: 41.9 km^{2} (16.2 sq mi)
- Elevation: 912 m (2,992 ft)

Population (2025-01-01)
  - Total: 1,841
  - Density: 43.9/km^{2} (114/sq mi)
- Demonym(s): Ribetà, ribetana
- Website: www.ajribesdefreser.cat

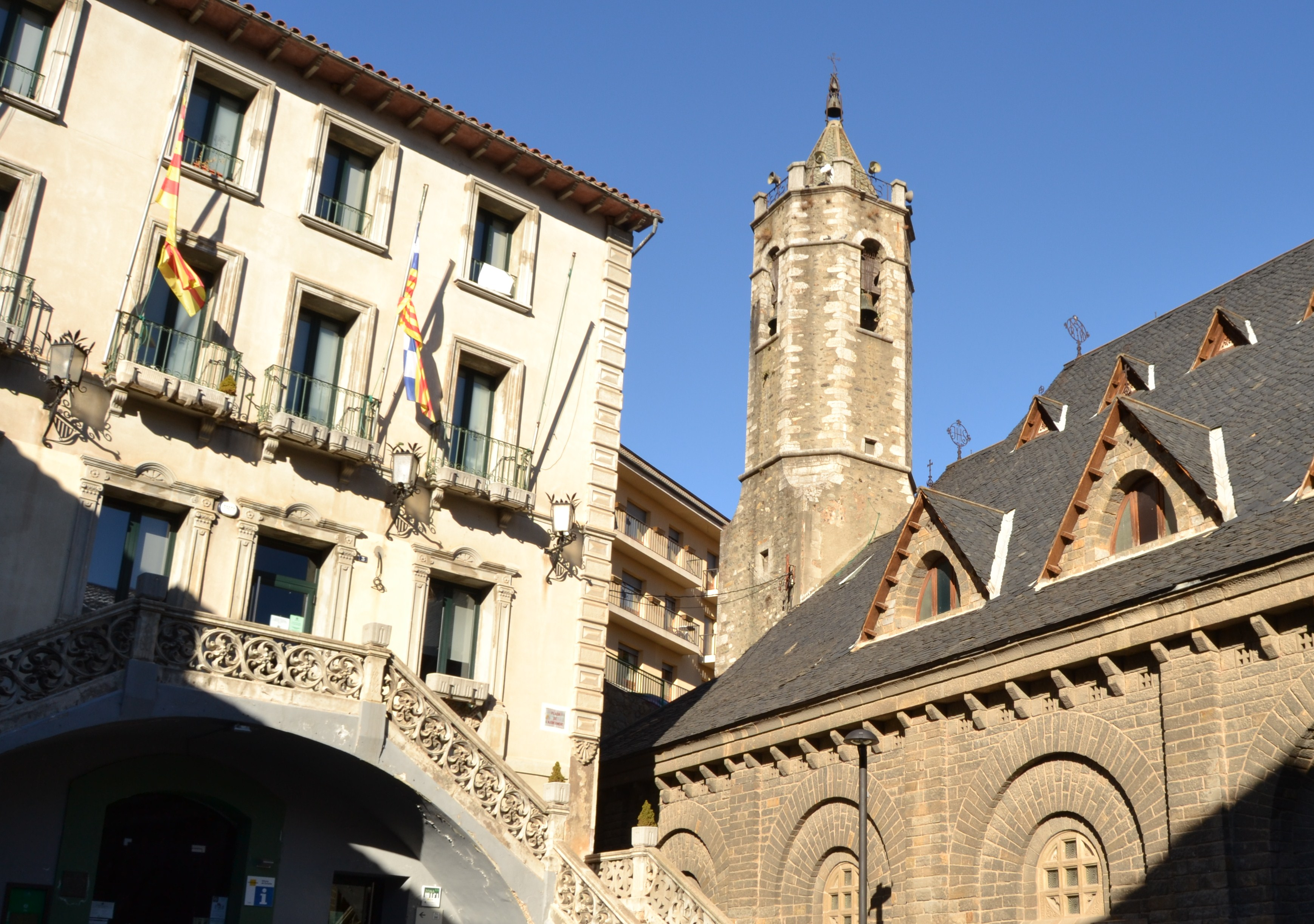
Church of Santa Maria and Town Hall

Ribes de Freser (Catalan pronunciation: [ˈriβəz ðə fɾəˈze]) is a municipality in the comarca of the Ripollès in Girona, Catalonia. It is situated at the confluence of the Freser, Rigard and Segadell rivers, 14 km (8.7 mi) north of Ripoll. It is known for its mineral water, paper manufacture and milk products, and is also an important tourist centre. A rack railway runs from the town to Queralbs and to the shrine of Núria, through the Vall de Núria. The town is on the communication route from Barcelona to Puigcerdà (N-152 road and Renfe railway line). One of the largest celebrations in Ribes de Freser is the Festival of Saint Joseph where children and adults enjoy a ceremony put on by the church and then play with fireworks around a great bonfire set in the middle of the town square. The town is home to the families of some of the historically oldest living Spanish individuals in the nation, such examples are the families of Maria Branyas, the previous oldest living person, and Ana María Vela Rubio.

The natural mineral water Aigua de Ribes comes from the spring located in Ribes de Freser, Girona, Spain where it is also bottled.

== Demography ==
1900	1930	1950	1970	1986	2005
1699	2965	3564	3133	2627	2044

== See also ==
- Vall de Núria Rack Railway
