= Queralbs =

- Municipality
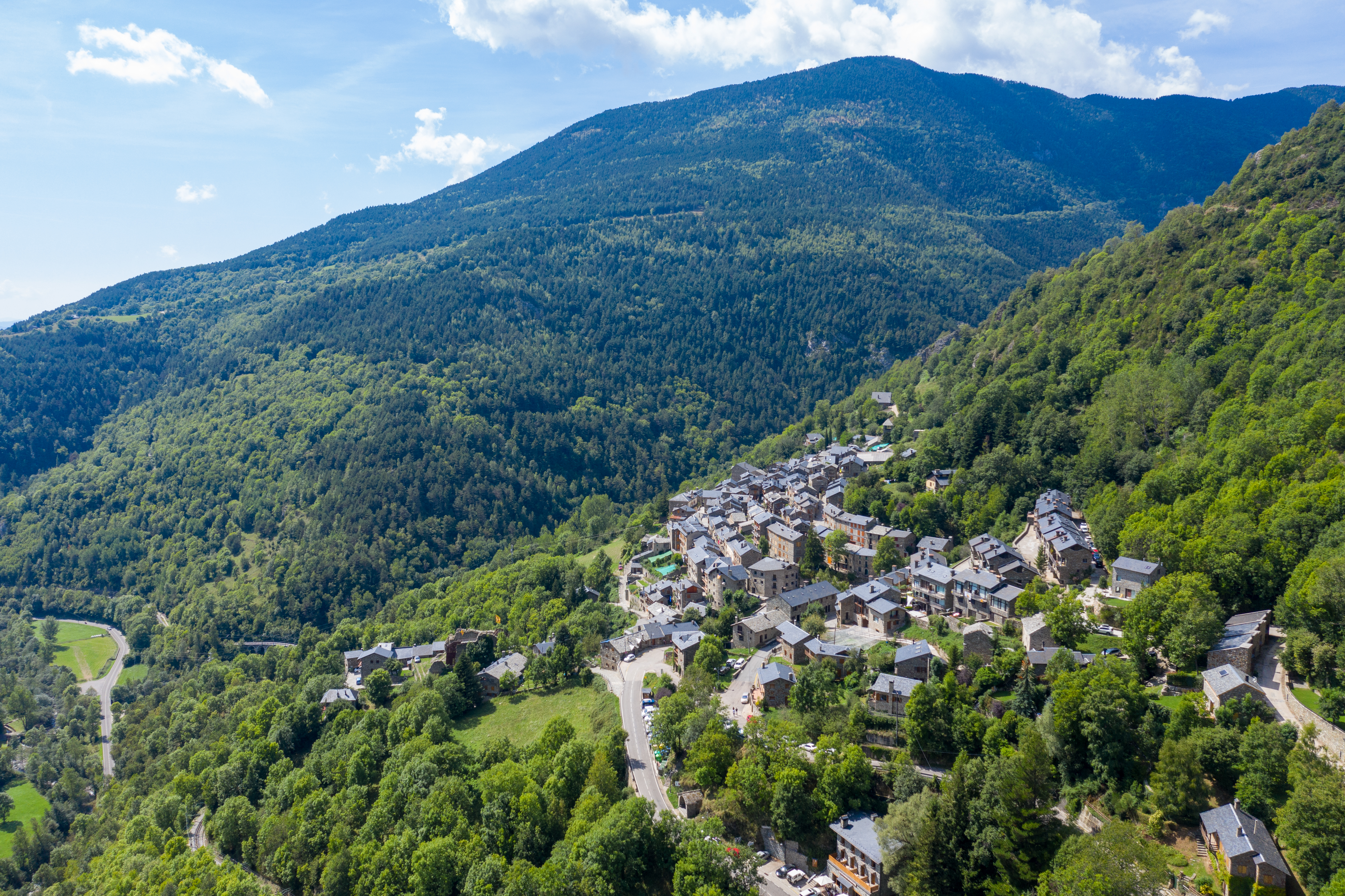
- Queralbs town hall

- Flag Coat of arms

- Location in the Province of Girona Location in Catalonia Location in Spain
- Coordinates: 42°21′02″N 2°09′47″E
- Country: Spain
- Community: Catalonia
- Province: Girona
- Comarca: Ripollès

Government
  - Mayor: Maria Inmaculada Constans Ruiz (2015) (JxCat)

Area
  - Total: 93.5 km^{2} (36.1 sq mi)
- Elevation: 1,236 m (4,055 ft)

Population (2025-01-01)
  - Total: 202
  - Density: 2.16/km^{2} (5.60/sq mi)
- Demonym(s): Queralbí, queralbina
- Website: www.ajqueralbs.cat

Queralbs (Catalan pronunciation: [kəˈɾalps]) is a municipality in the comarca of the Ripollès in the province of Girona, Catalonia, Spain. It is situated in the Pyrenees to the north of Ribes de Freser, near the peaks of Puigmal (2909 m), Infern (2896 m) and Noufonts (2864 m). Tourism and hydroelectricity are the bases of the local economy. The Virgin of Nuria shrine is situated in the municipality, to the north of the village in Vall de Núria: it houses a romanesque mural image of la Mare de Déu de Núria. The shrine is reached by Vall de Núria Rack Railway from Ribes de Freser, which also serves the village. There is also a local road to Ribes de Freser (7 kilometres; 4.3 mi), which serves the ski resort.

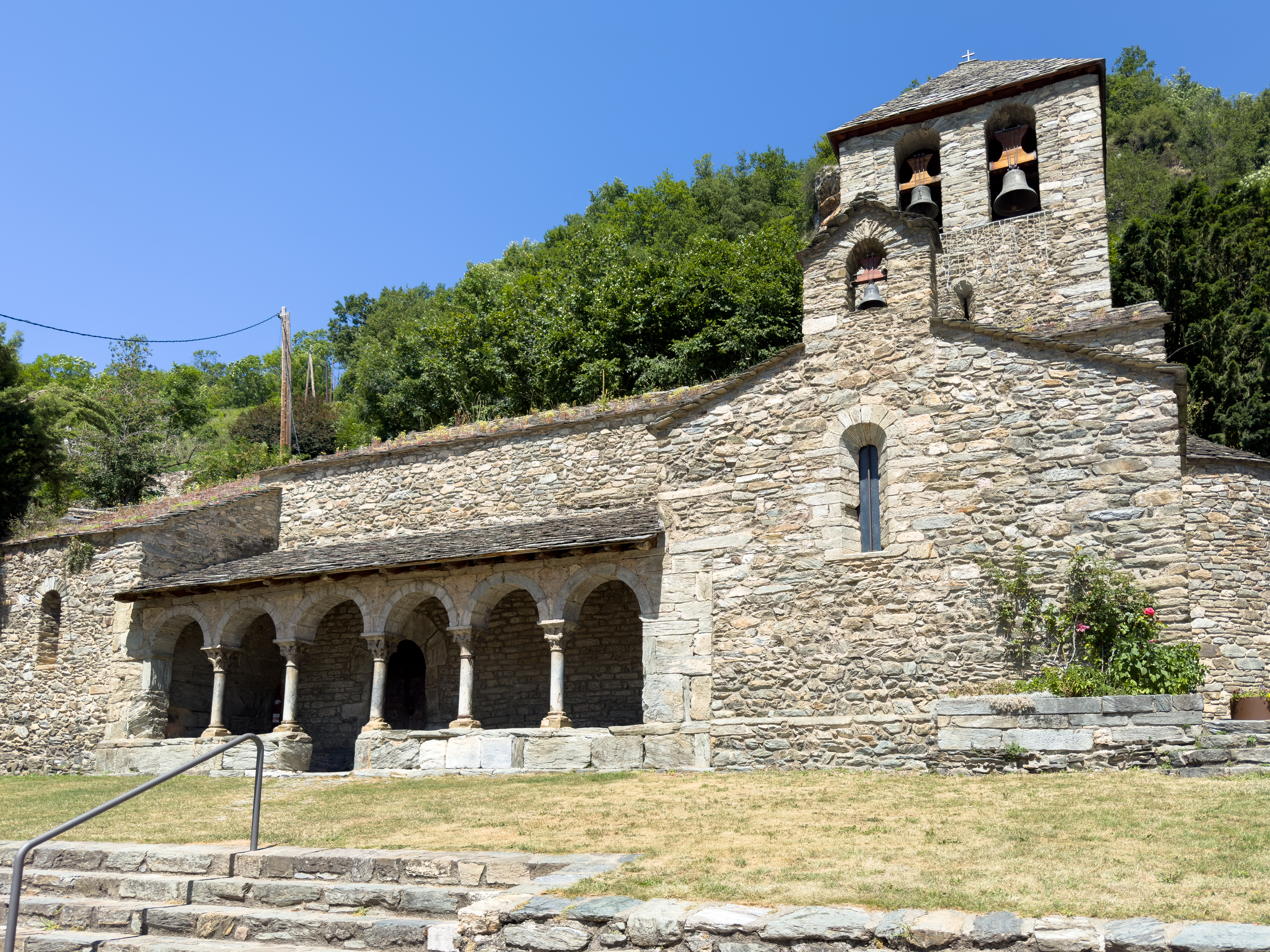
Portico of the Romanesque Church in Queralbs

The first historical mention of Queralbs is in the consecration act of the church of the Urgell Diocese in 836—thus the town's motto, poble mil·lenari (millennial town)—and its Romanesque church, dedicated to Saint James, dates to the late tenth century.

== Earthquakes ==
Queralbs is located to the north-west of the active Amer-Brugent fault system. Queralbs was entirely destroyed in the Catalan earthquake of 1428 whose epicentre was in nearby Camprodon.

== Demography ==
| 1900 | 1930 | 1950 | 1970 | 1986 | 2005 |
|---|---|---|---|---|---|
| 611 | 496 | 502 | 263 | 200 | 202 |

== Notable people ==
For many years, Queralbs was the summer vacation home for the former president of the Generalitat, Jordi Pujol, and his wife, Marta Ferrusola.

== Gallery ==
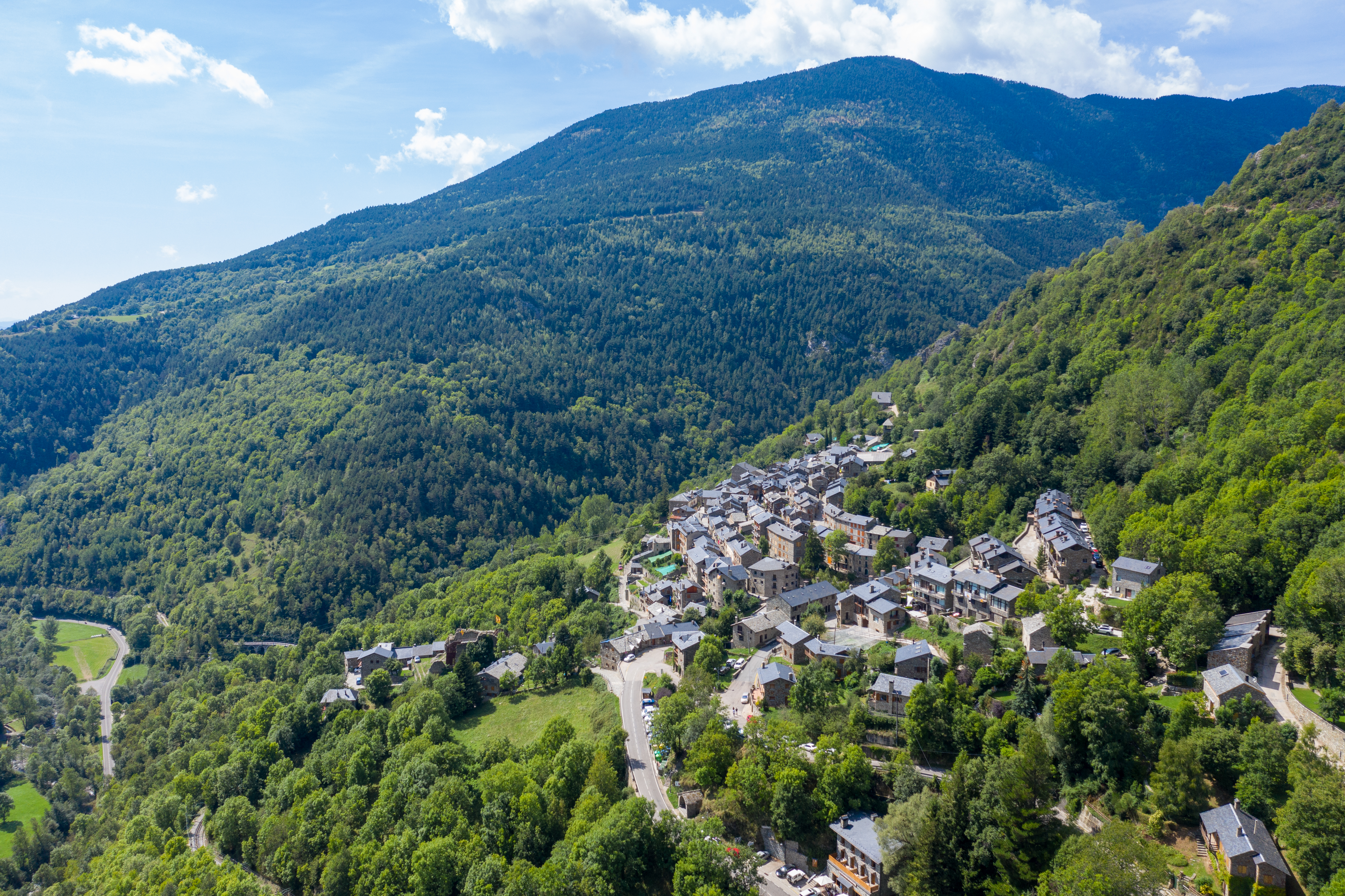

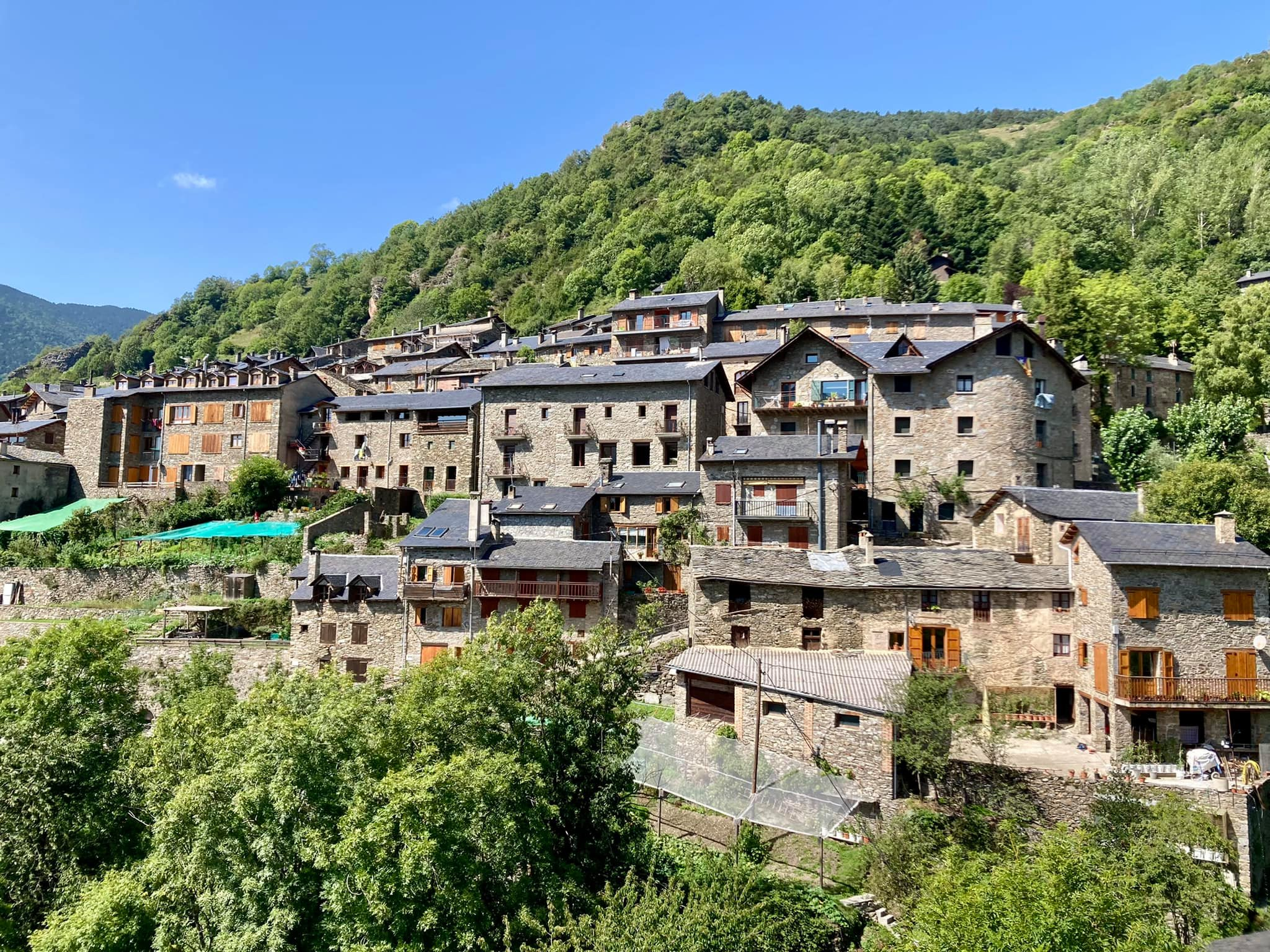

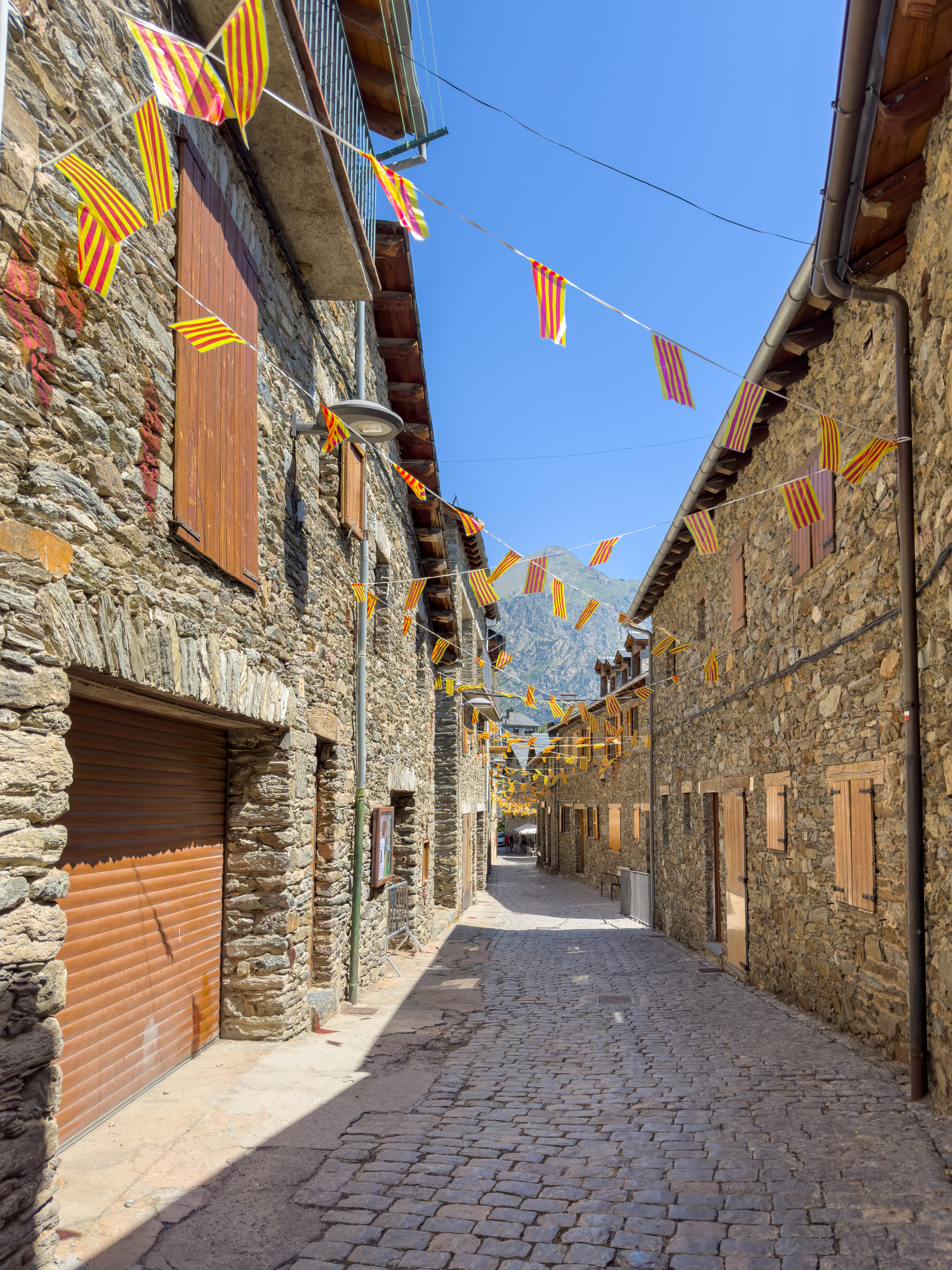

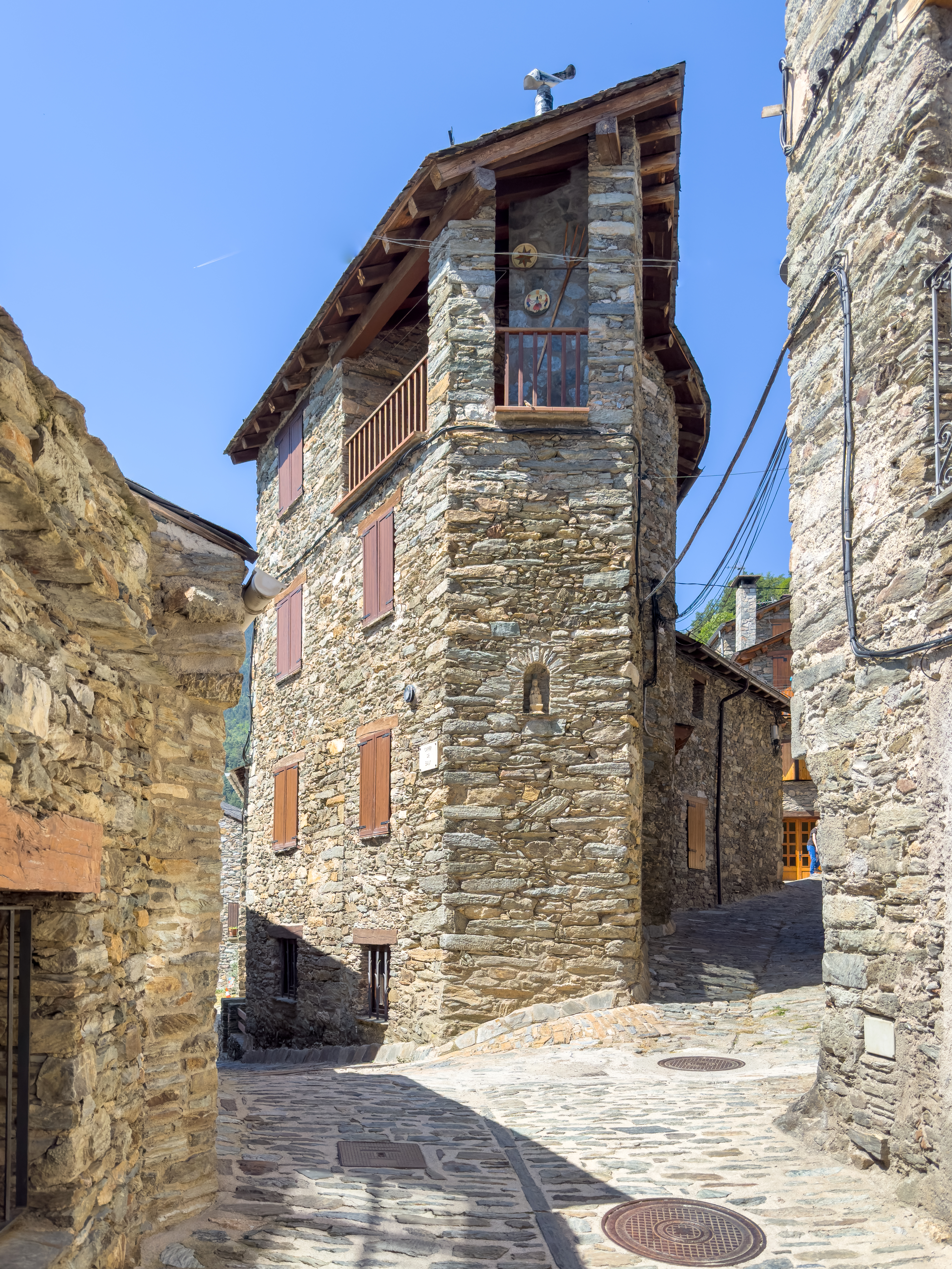

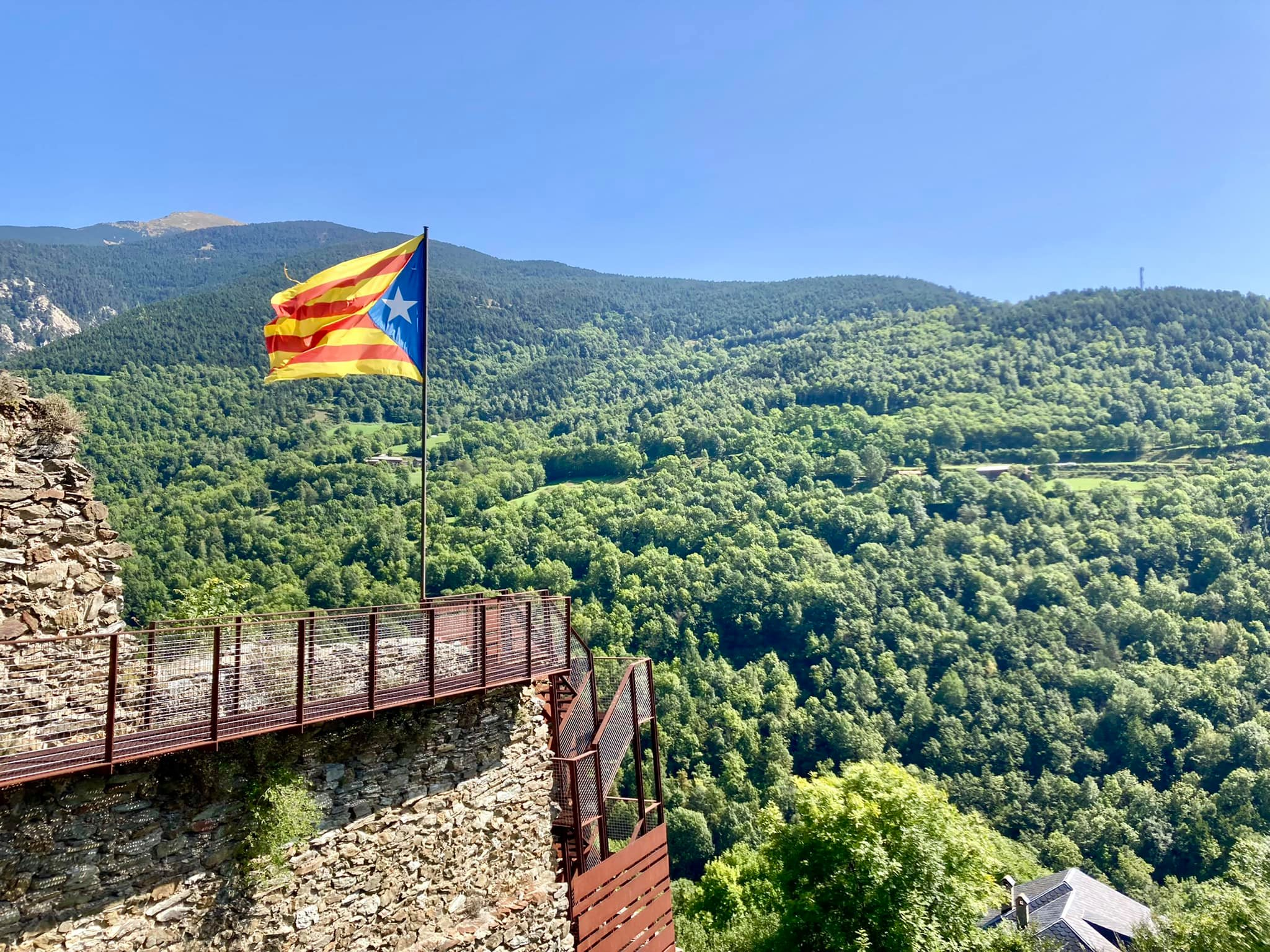

== See also ==
- Vall de Núria Rack Railway
