= Gombrèn =

- Municipality
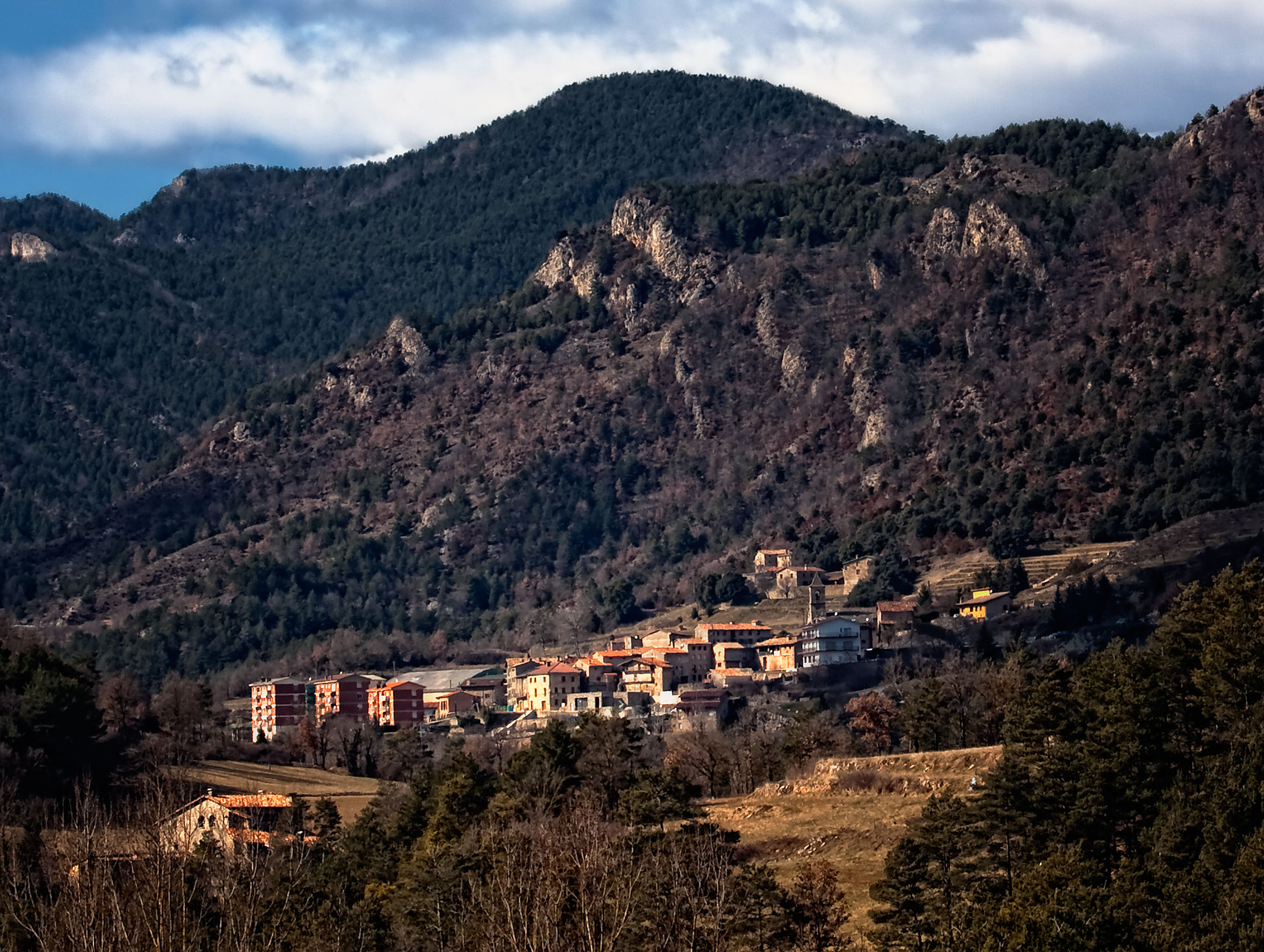
- Gombrèn

- Coat of arms

- Location in Catalonia Gombrèn (Spain)
- Coordinates: 42°14′54″N 2°5′29″E
- Country: Spain
- Community: Catalonia
- Province: Girona
- Comarca: Ripollès

Government
  - Mayor: César Ollé Garcia (2024)

Area
  - Total: 43.3 km^{2} (16.7 sq mi)

Population (2025-01-01)
  - Total: 206
  - Density: 4.76/km^{2} (12.3/sq mi)
- Website: gombren.cat

Gombrèn (Catalan pronunciation: [ɡumˈbɾɛn]) is a village in the province of Girona and autonomous community of Catalonia, Spain. The municipality covers an area of 43.3 square kilometres (16.7 sq mi) and the population in 2014 was 195.
