= Llanars =

- Municipality
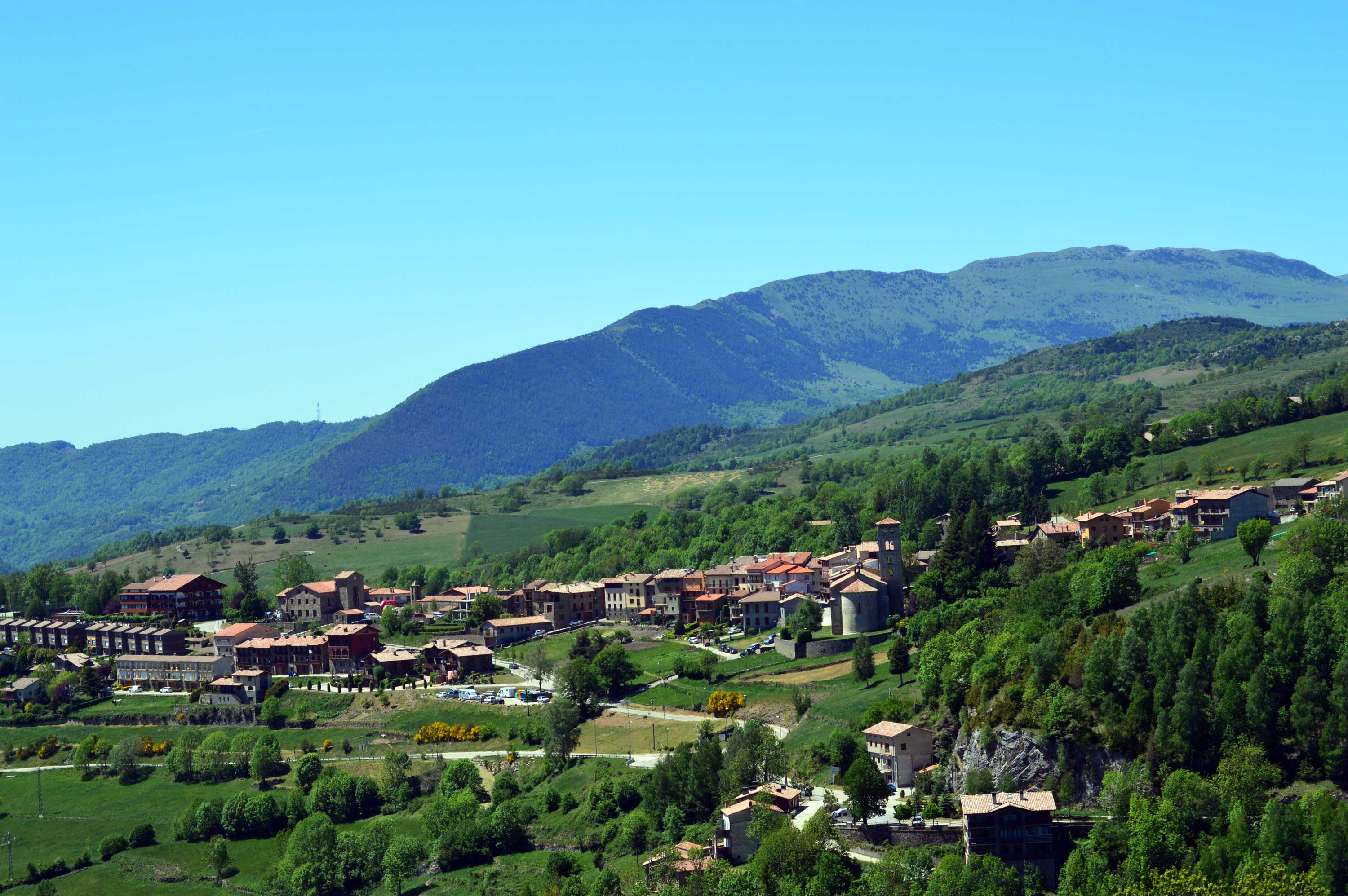

- Coat of arms

- Location in Catalonia Llanars (Spain)
- Coordinates: 42°19′22″N 2°20′43″E
- Country: Spain
- Community: Catalonia
- Province: Girona
- Comarca: Ripollès

Government
  - Mayor: Amadeo Rosell Martí (2015)

Area
  - Total: 24.7 km^{2} (9.5 sq mi)
- Elevation: 983 m (3,225 ft)

Population (2025-01-01)
  - Total: 516
  - Density: 20.9/km^{2} (54.1/sq mi)
- Demonym(s): Llanarencs, llanarenques
- Website: www.llanars.cat

Llanars (Catalan pronunciation: [ʎəˈnas]) is a municipality in the Pyrenean comarca of Ripollès in Girona, Catalonia, Spain. The parish church is a Romanesque church: Sant Esteve de Llanars.

The village name is documented from the 1068, with the Llenars form.
