= Planoles =

- Municipality
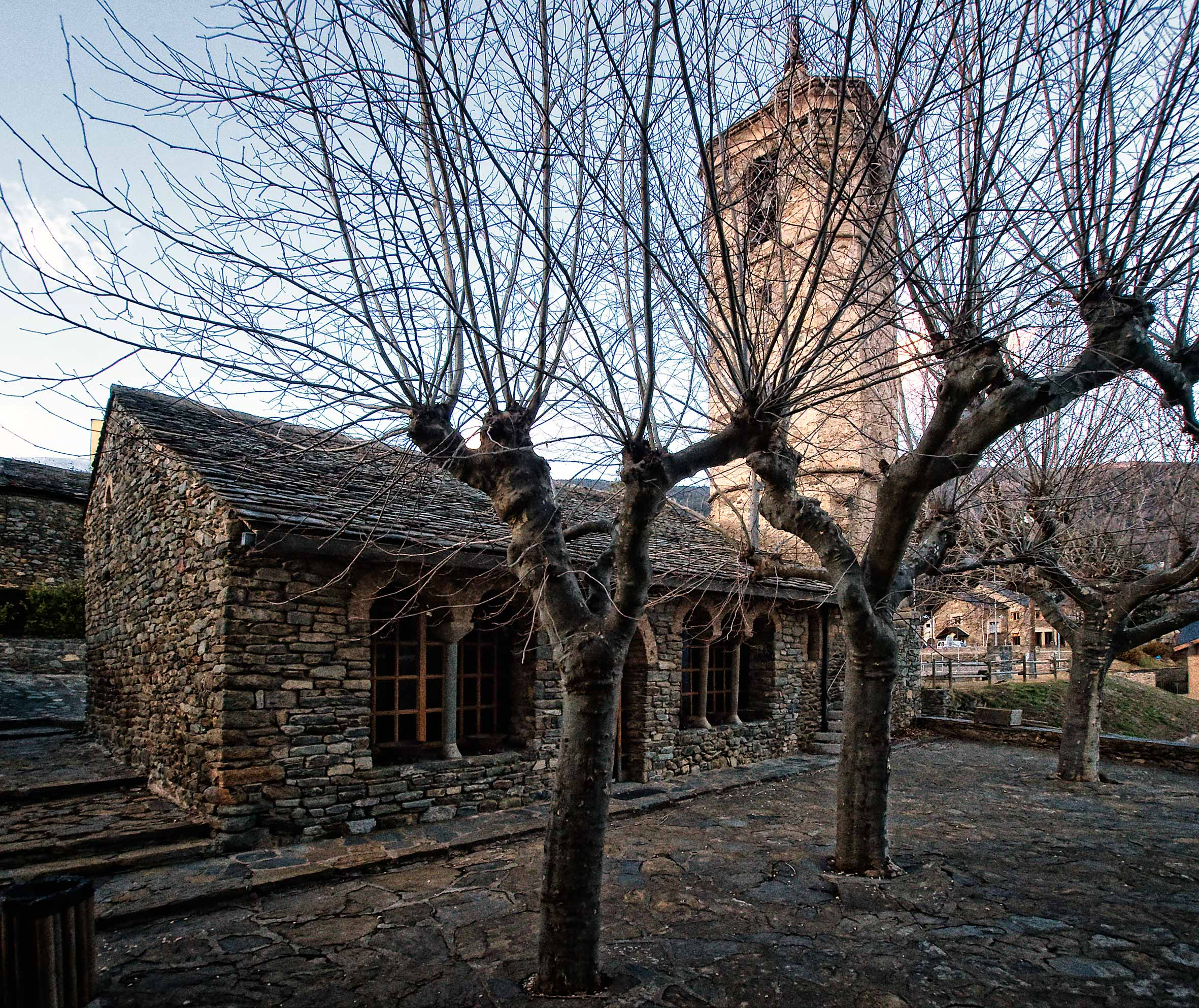
- St. Vincent's church

- Coat of arms

- Location in Catalonia Planoles (Spain)
- Coordinates: 42°19′4″N 2°6′20″E
- Country: Spain
- Community: Catalonia
- Province: Girona
- Comarca: Ripollès

Government
  - Mayor: Josep Maria Corcuera Orteu (2015)

Area
  - Total: 18.8 km^{2} (7.3 sq mi)

Population (2025-01-01)
  - Total: 313
  - Density: 16.6/km^{2} (43.1/sq mi)
- Website: webspobles2.ddgi.cat/planoles

Planoles (Catalan pronunciation: [pləˈnɔləs]) is a village in the province of Girona and autonomous community of Catalonia, Spain. The municipality covers an area of 18.7 square kilometres (7.2 sq mi) and the population in 2014 was 300.
