= Camprodon =

- Municipality
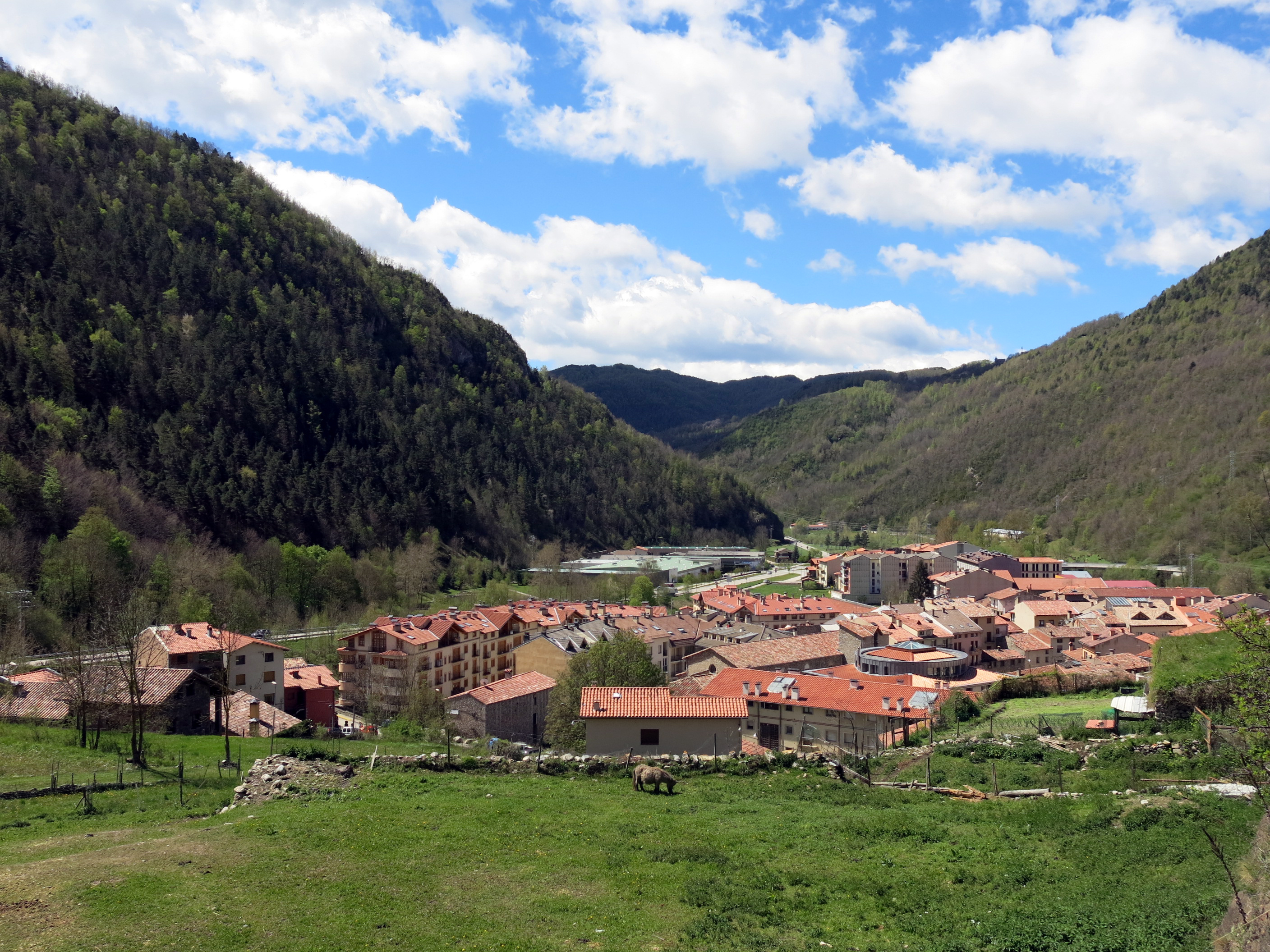

- Coat of arms

- Location in Catalonia Camprodon (Catalonia) Camprodon (Spain)
- Coordinates: 42°18′57″N 2°22′00″E
- Country: Spain
- Community: Catalonia
- Province: Girona
- Comarca: Ripollès

Government
  - Mayor: Francesc Xavier Sala Pujol (2015)

Area
  - Total: 103.4 km^{2} (39.9 sq mi)
- Elevation: 988 m (3,241 ft)

Population (2025-01-01)
  - Total: 2,570
  - Density: 24.9/km^{2} (64.4/sq mi)
- Demonyms: Camprodonins, camprodonines
- Website: www.camprodon.cat

Camprodon (Catalan pronunciation: [kəmpɾuˈðon]; from Camp Rodó "Round Field", ultimately from Latin Campus Rotundus) is a small town in the comarca of Ripollès in Girona, Catalonia, Spain, located in the Pyrenees, near the French border.

== History ==
The settlement of Camprodon was in 1118, when Ramon Berenguer III allowed the building of a market near the monastery of Sant Pere de Camprodon, which is located in the present-day town. In 1252, Camprodon was granted the title of royal city and left the jurisdiction of the abbot of Sant Pere.

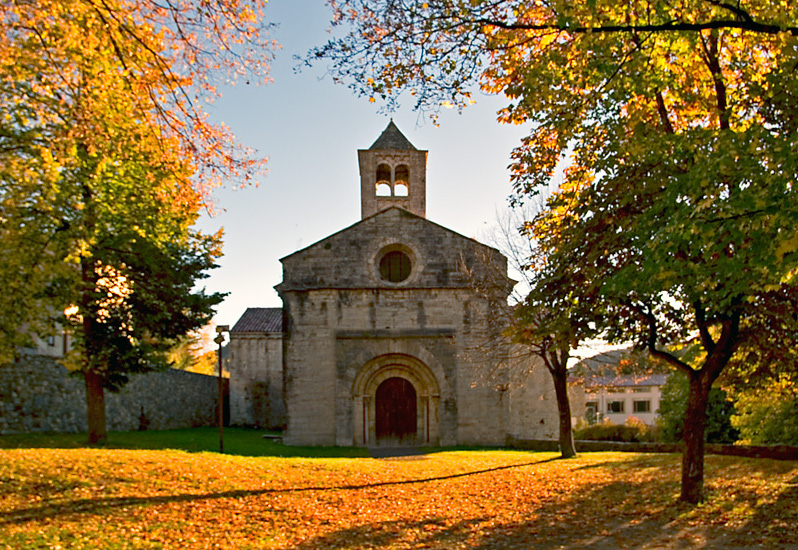
Sant Pere de Camprodon

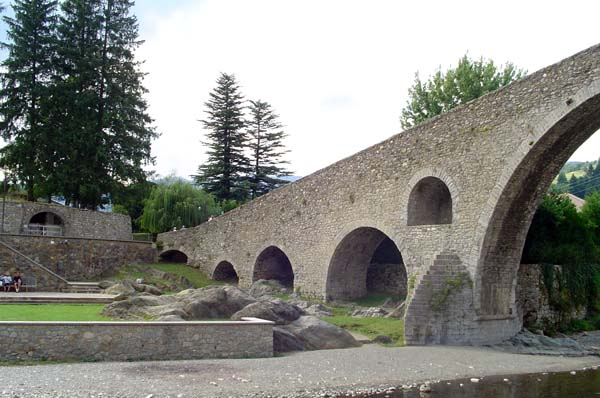
Pont Nou de Camprodon

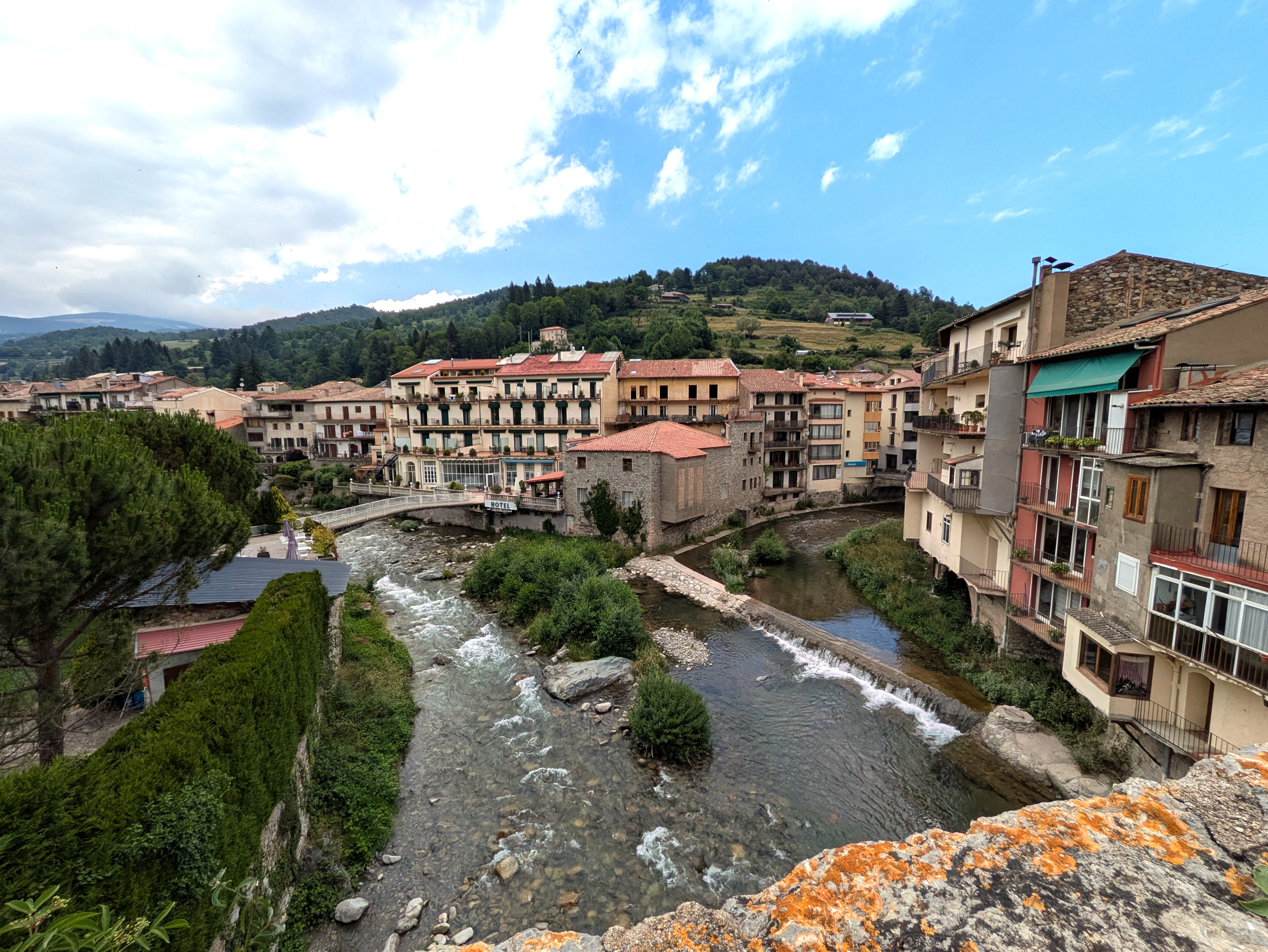
Confluence of the rivers Ter (on the left) and Ritort, as seen from Pont Nou.

The city celebrates the feast day of Sant Patllari (Palladius of Embrun), and the church of Santa Maria de Camprodon claims his relics, which lie in a 14th-century reliquary (arqueta de Sant Patllari).

The epicentre of the Catalan earthquake of 1428 that killed hundreds of people was near Camprodon. The earthquake was related to the active Amer-Brugent fault system which lies to the south-east of Camprodon.

== Notable people ==
- It is the birthplace of the musician Isaac Albéniz, and has a museum dedicated to him.
- Ski mountaineer Marc Solà Pastoret was born there.
