= Ripollès =

Coordinates: 42°16′16″N 2°15′19″E

- Comarca
- Country: Spain
- Autonomous community: Catalonia
- Region: Comarques Gironines
- Province: Girona
- Capital: Ripoll
- Municipalities: List: Campdevànol, Campelles, Camprodon, Gombrèn, Llanars, Les Llosses, Molló, Ogassa, Pardines, Planoles, Queralbs, Ribes de Freser, Ripoll, Sant Joan de les Abadesses, Sant Pau de Segúries, Setcases, Toses, Vallfogona de Ripollès, Vilallonga de Ter

Government
  - Body: Ripollès Comarcal Council
  - President: Amadeu Rosell (ERC)

Area
  - Total: 956.6 km^{2} (369.3 sq mi)

Population (2014)
  - Total: 25,700
  - Density: 26.9/km^{2} (69.6/sq mi)
- Demonym
- Time zone: UTC+1 (CET)
  - Summer (DST): UTC+2 (CEST)
- Largest municipality: Ripoll
- Website: ripolles.cat

Ripollès (Catalan pronunciation: [ripuˈʎɛs]; Spanish: Ripollés) is a comarca (county) in the Girona region, Catalonia, Spain. It is located in the Ribes and Camprodon river valleys. In 2001, its population was 25,744, about 40% of whom lived in the capital, Ripoll.

Ripollès borders the comarques of Baixa Cerdanya, Berguedà, Lluçanès, Osona, Garrotxa, and – across the border in France – Vallespir, Conflent, and Alta Cerdanya.

== Municipalities ==
Municipality	Population (2014)	Area km^{2}
Campdevànol	3,395	32.6
Campelles	132	18.6
Camprodon	2,359	103.4
Gombrèn	195	43.3
Llanars	509	24.7
Les Llosses	211	114.0
Molló	339	43.1
Ogassa	245	45.2
Pardines	155	31.0
Planoles	300	18.8
Queralbs	182	93.5
Ribes de Freser	1,859	41.9
Ripoll	10,751	73.7
Sant Joan de les Abadesses	3,413	53.7
Sant Pau de Segúries	674	8.7
Setcases	195	49.1
Toses	150	57.9
Vallfogona de Ripollès	215	39.2
Vilallonga de Ter	421	64.2
• Total: 19	25,700	956.6

== See also ==
- Sub-Pyrenees
