= 2016 Volta a Catalunya =

2016 UCI World Tour, race 5 of 28

Race details
- Dates: March 21, 2016–March 27, 2016
- Stages: 7
- Distance: 1,219.6 km (757.8 mi)
- Winning time: 30h 50' 19"

Results
Jersey awarded to the overall winner	Winner	Nairo Quintana (COL)	(Movistar Team)
	Second	Alberto Contador (ESP)	(Tinkoff)
	Third	Dan Martin (IRL)	(Etixx–Quick-Step)
Jersey awarded to the mountains classification winner	Mountains	Thomas De Gendt (BEL)	(Lotto–Soudal)
Jersey awarded to the young rider classification winner	Young rider	Hugh Carthy (GBR)	(Caja Rural–Seguros RGA)
Jersey awarded to the sprints classification winner	Sprints	Thomas De Gendt (BEL)	(Lotto–Soudal)
	Team	BMC Racing Team	

The 2016 Volta a Catalunya was a road cycling stage race that took place in Catalonia, Spain, from 21 to 27 March. It was the fifth race of the 2016 UCI World Tour and the 96th edition of the Volta a Catalunya.

The race included seven stages. Two of these included summit finishes, so the favourites for the race were all climbers. Favourites for overall victory included Chris Froome (Team Sky), Alberto Contador (Tinkoff), Nairo Quintana (Movistar Team) and the defending champion Richie Porte (BMC Racing Team): the race was the first meeting of several of the riders expected to feature in the Grand Tours later in the season.

The first two stages were Nacer Bouhanni (Cofidis). He then withdrew through illness on the third stage, which included the first summit finish. This was won by Dan Martin (Etixx–Quick-Step), who took over the overall lead. Martin lost the lead, however, on the next stage, the second summit finish of the race, where Quintana won the stage and took over the overall lead. Quintana defended his lead over the following stage to take the overall victory, seven seconds ahead of Contador, with Martin ten seconds further back in third. Thomas De Gendt (Lotto–Soudal) won both the mountains and intermediate sprints classifications, with Hugh Carthy (Caja Rural–Seguros RGA) winning the young rider classification. BMC won the team classification.

== Route ==
The 2016 Volta a Catalunya included seven stages, all of which were road stages with no time trials. The first two stages were moderately hilly and were possibly suitable for sprinters. The third and fourth stage both included summit finishes. The third stage finished on the climb of La Molina, with the fourth finishing at Port Ainé. The fifth stage included a climb shortly before the finish, giving an opportunity for an attack, before another flat stage on the sixth day. The final stage finished on a hilly circuit in Barcelona.

Following the cancellation of mountain stages in both Paris–Nice and Tirreno–Adriatico in the previous weeks, there was some concern before the start of the race that the Volta might also be affected by heavy snow; the finish at Port Ainé still had 75 centimetres (2.5 ft) of snow on the nearby ski slopes.

Stages in the 2016 Volta a Catalunya
Stage	Date	Course	Distance	Type	Winner
1	21 March	Calella to Calella	175.8 km (109 mi)	Hilly stage	Nacer Bouhanni (FRA)
2	22 March	Mataró to Olot	178.7 km (111 mi)	Medium-mountain stage	Nacer Bouhanni (FRA)
3	23 March	Girona to La Molina	172.1 km (107 mi)	Mountain stage	Dan Martin (IRL)
4	24 March	Bagà to Port Ainé	172.2 km (107 mi)	Mountain stage	Thomas De Gendt (BEL)
5	25 March	Rialp to Valls	187.2 km (116 mi)	Medium-mountain stage	Wout Poels (NED)
6	26 March	Sant Joan Despí to Vilanova i la Geltrú	197.2 km (123 mi)	Flat stage	Davide Cimolai (ITA)
7	27 March	Barcelona to Barcelona	136.4 km (85 mi)	Hilly stage	Alexey Tsatevich (RUS)

== Participating teams ==
The race organisers invited 25 teams to enter the Volta a Catalunya. These included the eighteen UCI WorldTeams, which were automatically invited and obliged to enter a team. Seven Professional Continental teams received wild card invitations Each team could include eight riders. Astana only included seven riders in their team, so 199 riders started the first stage.

UCI WorldTeams

- AG2R La Mondiale
- Astana
- BMC Racing Team
- Team Dimension Data
- Etixx–Quick-Step
- FDJ
- IAM Cycling
- Lampre–Merida
- Lotto–Soudal
- Movistar Team
- Team Giant–Alpecin
- Team Katusha
- LottoNL–Jumbo
- Team Sky
- Tinkoff
- Trek–Segafredo
- Cannondale
- Orica–GreenEDGE

UCI Professional Continental teams

- Caja Rural–Seguros RGA
- CCC–Sprandi–Polkowice
- Cofidis
- Roompot–Oranje Peloton
- Team Roth
- Verva ActiveJet
- Wanty–Groupe Gobert

== Pre-race favourites ==
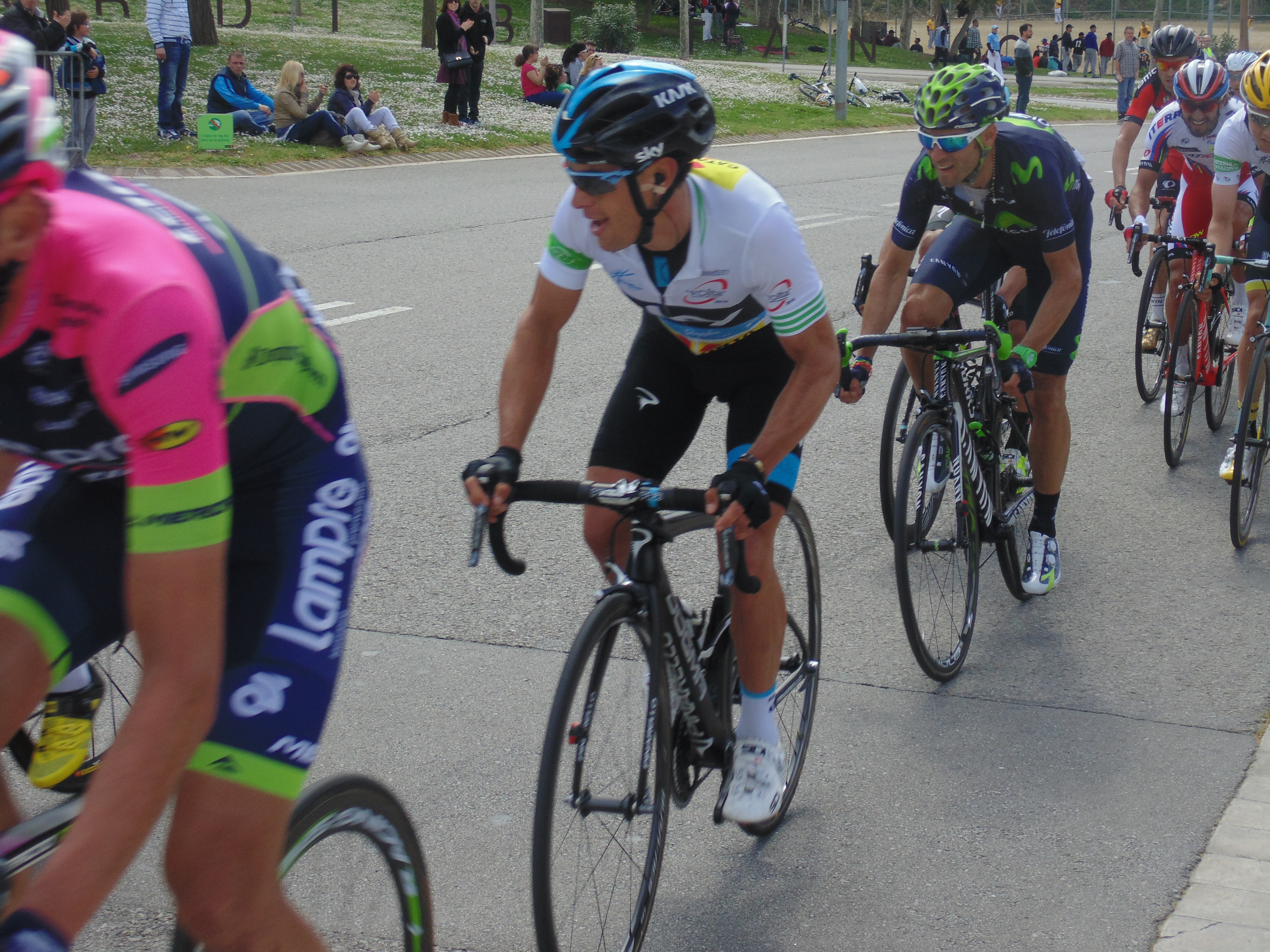
Richie Porte (BMC Racing Team) riding in the leader's jersey in the 2015 edition, which he won. He was one of the favourites for victory in 2016.

The race was expected to be decided on its two mountainous days and so was particularly suited for climbers. Cyclingnews.com described the list of favourites for victory at the Volta as "formidable" and as including "almost all the main contenders for both the Giro d'Italia and the Tour de France". Foremost among these was Chris Froome (Team Sky), the reigning champion of the Tour de France. Froome's only previous race in the 2016 season was the Herald Sun Tour, which he won. Froome had a strong team that included two other possible contenders for overall victory: Geraint Thomas (who had won Paris–Nice) and Wout Poels (who had won the Volta a la Comunitat Valenciana). Froome's form was, however, described by his directeur sportif as "an incognito", given the long period since his last race.

The prominent riders competing with Froome for overall victory included Alberto Contador (Tinkoff), the reigning champion of the Giro d'Italia; Nairo Quintana (Movistar Team), who was second in the 2016 Tour de France; Fabio Aru (Astana), the reigning champion of the Vuelta a España; and Richie Porte (BMC Racing Team), the defending champion of the Volta itself. Other riders with a chance of high placings included Joaquim Rodríguez (Team Katusha), who had won the race on two previous occasions, and Dan Martin (Etixx–Quick-Step), the 2013 Volta winner, as well as many other climbers.

On account of the mountainous terrain, there were few pure sprinters starting the race. The strongest sprinter who was present was Nacer Bouhanni (Cofidis), who had been strong in Paris–Nice and had been close to victory in Milan–San Remo until his chain slipped.

== Stages ==
=== Stage 1 ===
21 March 2016, Calella to Calella, 175.8 km (109.2 mi)

The first stage of the Volta covered a 175.8-kilometre (109.2 mi) course that started and ended on the coast in Calella; the course looped through an inland region and crossed several climbs. After first travelling along the coast, the riders turned north as far as Anglès, then turned west to cross the day's first climb, the second-category Alt de les Guilleries, followed immediately by the third-category Alt de Viladrau. As the roads turned back to the south, there was then a flat section before the biggest climb of the day, the first-category Coli Formic. After the descent came the second-category Alt de Montseny and the final climb of the day, the third-category Alt de Collsacreu. The summit of the final climb came with 18.2 kilometres (11.3 mi) to the finish line, on a long straight road in Calella.

An early breakaway was formed by Lluís Mas (Caja Rural–Seguros RGA), Boris Dron (Wanty–Groupe Gobert) and Cameron Meyer (Team Dimension Data); they built a lead of over six minutes. From the climb of the Coll Formic, however, they were chased by Movistar and Cofidis; Meyer was the first over the summit to take the lead of the mountains classification, but they were caught soon afterwards. On the Alt de Montseny, Louis Vervaeke (Lotto–Soudal) broke away, with a six-man group chasing; meanwhile the main group split in two until Vasil Kiryienka (Sky) pulled the groups back together.

With 15 kilometres (9.3 mi) remaining, Sky and Cofidis came to the front of the peloton to control the race for their sprinters. Björn Thurau attacked and was quickly brought back; Nicolas Roche (Sky) then attacked on a slight uphill section of road with approximately 5 kilometres (3.1 mi) remaining and built a twelve-second lead. He was caught, however, by Tinkoff and Orica–GreenEDGE within the final 2 kilometres (1.2 mi). After Katusha led the peloton under the flamme rouge, Orica–GreenEDGE opened up the sprint with Simon Gerrans. Ben Swift (Sky) and Nacer Bouhanni (Cofidis) followed Gerrans and Bouhanni came past to win the stage. Swift was second, with Gerrans third.

Stage 1 result
Rank	Rider	Team	Time
1	Nacer Bouhanni (FRA)	Cofidis	4hr 28' 51"
2	Ben Swift (GBR)	Team Sky	+ 0"
3	Daryl Impey (RSA)	Orica–GreenEDGE	+ 0"
4	Enrico Gasparotto (ITA)	Wanty–Groupe Gobert	+ 0"
5	Alexey Tsatevich (RUS)	Team Katusha	+ 0"
6	Carlos Barbero (ESP)	Caja Rural–Seguros RGA	+ 0"
7	Jordi Simón (ESP)	Verva ActiveJet	+ 0"
8	Kévin Reza (FRA)	FDJ	+ 0"
9	Eduard Prades (ESP)	Caja Rural–Seguros RGA	+ 0"
10	Georg Preidler (AUT)	Team Giant–Alpecin	+ 0"

General classification after stage 1
Rank	Rider	Team	Time
1	Nacer Bouhanni (FRA)	Cofidis	4hr 28' 41"
2	Ben Swift (GBR)	Team Sky	+ 4"
3	Daryl Impey (RSA)	Orica–GreenEDGE	+ 6"
4	Louis Vervaeke (BEL)	Lotto–Soudal	+ 7"
5	Javier Moreno (ESP)	Movistar Team	+ 8"
6	Ruben Fernández (ESP)	Movistar Team	+ 9"
7	Cameron Meyer (AUS)	Team Dimension Data	+ 9"
8	Enrico Gasparotto (ITA)	Wanty–Groupe Gobert	+ 10"
9	Alexey Tsatevich (RUS)	Team Katusha	+ 10"
10	Carlos Barbero (ESP)	Caja Rural–Seguros RGA	+ 10"

=== Stage 2 ===
22 March, Mataró to Olot, 178.7 km (111.0 mi)

The second stage was raced over a 178.7-kilometre (111.0 mi) course from Mataró to Olot. The stage was generally flat, with two categorised climbs. The first of these was the third-category Alt de Can Bordoi after 30 kilometres (18.6 mi). The second was the first-category Alt de Els Angels; at the summit of the climb there were 70 kilometres (43 mi) remaining. In the final 15 kilometres (9.3 mi), the roads rose again, although there was not a categorised climb and the final kilometres were flat. There was a 270° turn with just over 1 kilometre (0.62 mi) remaining; after this the road was straight all the way to the finish.

Before the stage started, there was a minute's silence to acknowledge the bombings in Brussels that morning, with many riders – especially the Belgians – wearing black armbands. There was a four-man early breakaway that included two Belgians – Boris Dron (Wanty–Groupe Gobert) and Thomas De Gendt (Lotto–Soudal) – alongside Kamil Gradek (Verva ActiveJet) and Maxime Bouet (Etixx–QuickStep). Dron was first across both categorised climbs, with De Gendt winning both intermediate sprints and the associated bonus seconds. Dron fell away from the break with 30 kilometres (19 mi) remaining; shortly afterwards De Gendt attacked alone. About 7 kilometres (4.3 mi) later, however, he gave up on his effort, as Cofidis were chasing too hard in the main peloton.

In the final 10 kilometres (6.2 mi), there were several teams attempting to control the peloton – including Team Sky with Chris Froome sitting in second place in an attempt to keep him out of danger. Movistar moved to the front with 3 kilometres (1.9 mi) remaining, with FDJ and Orica–GreenEDGE also at the front. In the final 1 kilometre (0.62 mi), however, Cofidis moved back to the front, with Geoffrey Soupe leading out Bouhanni. Bouhanni easily won the sprint, with Gianni Meersman (Etixx–Quick-Step) second and Philippe Gilbert (BMC) third. Bouhanni therefore extended his lead to 14 seconds ahead of Swift – who finished outside the top 10 – and De Gendt, who moved up to third thanks to the bonus seconds he won. Bouhanni revealed after the stage that he had been suffering from a sore stomach and had visited the race doctor.

Result of Stage 2
Rank	Rider	Team	Time
1	Nacer Bouhanni (FRA)	Cofidis	4hr 39' 10"
2	Gianni Meersman (BEL)	Etixx–Quick-Step	+ 0"
3	Philippe Gilbert (BEL)	BMC Racing Team	+ 0"
4	Alexey Tsatevich (RUS)	Team Katusha	+ 0"
5	Carlos Barbero (ESP)	Caja Rural–Seguros RGA	+ 0"
6	Kiel Reijnen (USA)	Trek–Segafredo	+ 0"
7	Enrico Gasparotto (ITA)	Wanty–Groupe Gobert	+ 0"
8	Jonas van Genechten (BEL)	IAM Cycling	+ 0"
9	Paweł Franczak (POL)	Verva ActiveJet	+ 0"
10	Kévin Reza (FRA)	FDJ	+ 0"

General classification after Stage 2
Rank	Rider	Team	Time
1	Nacer Bouhanni (FRA)	Cofidis	9hr 07' 41"
2	Ben Swift (GBR)	Team Sky	+ 14"
3	Thomas De Gendt (BEL)	Lotto–Soudal	+ 14"
4	Daryl Impey (RSA)	Orica–GreenEDGE	+ 16"
5	Philippe Gilbert (BEL)	BMC Racing Team	+ 16"
6	Maxime Bouet (FRA)	Etixx–Quick-Step	+ 16"
7	Louis Vervaeke (BEL)	Lotto–Soudal	+ 17"
8	Javier Moreno (ESP)	Movistar Team	+ 18"
9	Rubén Fernández (ESP)	Movistar Team	+ 19"
10	Alexey Tsatevich (RUS)	Team Katusha	+ 20"

=== Stage 3 ===
Profile of La Molina

23 March, Girona to La Molina, 172.1 km (106.9 mi)

The third stage included the first summit finish of the race. It covered a 172.1-kilometre (106.9 mi) route from Girona to the La Molina ski resort. The route generally took the riders north-west, with four first-category climbs along the way. After passing through Olot, where Stage 2 had finished, the riders crossed the Alt de Coubet after 63 kilometres (39.15 mi). There was then a long climb to the Alt de Toses, the highest climb of the day, which came with 56 kilometres (34.80 mi) to the finish line. After the descent, the riders passed through Alp, then began the first climb to La Molina, a 12.6-kilometre (7.8 mi) climb at an average gradient of 4.2%, including a descent towards the top. The riders then descended back into Alp and repeated the climb; the finish of the stage came at the ski station itself.

The day's early breakaway was formed by seven riders: Julian Alaphilippe (Etixx–Quick-Step), Koen Bouwman (LottoNL–Jumbo), Kévin Reza (FDJ), Johann van Zyl (Dimension Data), Jan Hirt (CCC–Sprandi–Polkowice), Huub Duyn (Roompot–Oranje Peloton) and Alex Howes (Cannondale). On the day's first climb, Bouhanni lost several minutes due to his stomach illness; after 90 kilometres (56 mi) he was over seven minutes behind the peloton and was forced to retire from the race. Howes and Duyn attacked the breakaway and had a 31-second lead going into the first of the two ascents of La Molina. During the climb, Pieter Weening (Roompot) attacked from the peloton and caught the two breakaway riders; almost immediately he attacked alone and built a gap. Meanwhile, Team Sky led the peloton with all eight riders, with Movistar close behind; they quickly caught Howes and Duyn. Weening had about a minute's advantage at the top of the climb.

During the descent, the peloton chased hard and reduced Weening's advantage to 30 seconds, with Sky still leading the peloton. Louis Meintjes (Lampre–Mérida) crashed shortly before the final climb began. On the climb, Louis Vervaeke attacked with 10 kilometres (6 mi) remaining and passed Weening. Within the final 5 kilometres (3.1 mi), the peloton caught him and the peloton stayed together, led by Sky, as the road descended briefly before the final ascent to the finishing line. Wout Poels (Sky) attacked as the road began to rise, but was followed by Contador. Quintana attacked next and was chased by Ilnur Zakarin (Katusha) and Contador. Richie Porte attempted to escape the group, but he was chased down by Froome. Quintana then attacked again and was followed by Dan Martin, who then passed Quintana and moved into the lead. Tejay van Garderen (BMC) chased, with Contador following, but Martin was able to stay away to the finish line. Contador finished two seconds back, with Romain Bardet (AG2R La Mondiale) third and van Garderen fourth, all on the same time. With the bonus seconds, Martin moved into the overall lead, six seconds ahead of Contador.

Result of Stage 3
Rank	Rider	Team	Time
1	Dan Martin (IRL)	Etixx–Quick-Step	5hr 00' 27"
2	Alberto Contador (ESP)	Tinkoff	+ 2"
3	Romain Bardet (FRA)	AG2R La Mondiale	+ 2"
4	Tejay van Garderen (USA)	BMC Racing Team	+ 2"
5	Richie Porte (AUS)	BMC Racing Team	+ 9"
6	Nairo Quintana (COL)	Movistar Team	+ 9"
7	Davide Formolo (ITA)	Cannondale	+ 11"
8	Ilnur Zakarin (RUS)	Team Katusha	+ 12"
9	Chris Froome (GBR)	Team Sky	+ 12"
10	Hugh Carthy (GBR)	Caja Rural–Seguros RGA	+ 18"

General classification after Stage 3
Rank	Rider	Team	Time
1	Dan Martin (IRL)	Etixx–Quick-Step	14hr 08' 18"
2	Alberto Contador (ESP)	Tinkoff	+ 6"
3	Romain Bardet (FRA)	AG2R La Mondiale	+ 8"
4	Tejay van Garderen (USA)	BMC Racing Team	+ 12"
5	Richie Porte (AUS)	BMC Racing Team	+ 19"
6	Nairo Quintana (COL)	Movistar Team	+ 19"
7	Davide Formolo (ITA)	Cannondale	+ 21"
8	Chris Froome (GBR)	Team Sky	+ 22"
9	Ilnur Zakarin (RUS)	Team Katusha	+ 22"
10	Hugh Carthy (GBR)	Caja Rural–Seguros RGA	+ 28"

=== Stage 4 ===
Profile of Stage 5

24 March, Bagà to Port Ainé, 172.2 km (107.0 mi)

The fourth stage included the second and final summit finish of the race. It covered a 172.2-kilometre (107.0 mi) route from Bagà to Port Ainé, with four categorised climbs on the route. The first climb came at the very beginning of the day's racing; it was a third-category climb whose summit came 5.6 kilometres (3.5 mi) into the stage. There was then a long flat section – which passed through Alp again – before the special-category Port de Cantó. After a steep descent, there was a first-category climb, followed by a descent. The final climb to Port Ainé was 18.5 kilometres (11.5 mi) at 6.8%.

The early breakaway was formed by Philippe Gilbert (BMC), Imanol Erviti (Movistar), Rubén Plaza (Orica–GreenEDGE), Thomas De Gendt (Lotto–Soudal), Laurens ten Dam (Team Giant–Alpecin), Kristijan Đurasek (Lampre–Mérida), Pieter Weening (Roompot), Boris Dron (Wanty–Groupe Gobert), Alexey Tsatevich (Katusha) and Ben Swift (Team Sky). Dron won the special-category climb, with the lead over the peloton at around ten minutes. The breakaway then broke up, with De Gendt and Erviti continuing together at the front of the race; on the penultimate climb, they had a seven-minute advantage on the peloton. Weening made contact with them again just before the summit of the climb and they collaborated on the descent. Coming towards the base of the final climb, Wout Poels (Sky) attacked from the peloton and linked up with Swift; despite their work, they were unable to build a significant advantage as Contador chased them.

On the final climb, Erviti attacked, but he was soon passed by Weening, who built up a minute's lead. Poels was eventually caught with 5 kilometres (3.1 mi) remaining, while De Gendt had caught up with Weening again. There were several attacks in the peloton, from Mikel Nieve (Sky), Robert Gesink (LottoNL–Jumbo) and Miguel Ángel López (Astana), but the first strong attack came from van Garderen. Contador eventually chased him, with Porte, Quintana and Martin following, but Martin was soon dropped. Van Garderen was caught by Contador's group and Contador and Quintana then dropped the BMC riders. Meanwhile, De Gendt passed Weening and continued solo to take the stage win. Quintana attacked in the final 1 kilometre (0.62 mi) and finished second, 15 seconds ahead of Porte and Contador. Quintana therefore took over the race lead, with Contador eight seconds behind in second.

After the stage, Contador blamed his time loss to Quintana on the effort he had put into chasing down attacks in the final kilometres, in particular that of van Garderen. Porte also praised van Garderen's efforts and was pleased with their collaboration. Froome, meanwhile, lost 37 seconds to Quintana and his directeur sportif, Nicolas Portal, said that he "didn't have the legs" to follow the leaders' attacks.

Result of Stage 4
Rank	Rider	Team	Time
1	Thomas De Gendt (BEL)	Lotto–Soudal	4hr 52' 04"
2	Nairo Quintana (COL)	Movistar Team	+ 1' 08"
3	Richie Porte (AUS)	BMC Racing Team	+ 1' 23"
4	Alberto Contador (ESP)	Tinkoff	+ 1' 23"
5	Tejay van Garderen (USA)	BMC Racing Team	+ 1' 36"
6	Pieter Weening (NED)	Roompot–Oranje Peloton	+ 1' 36"
7	Ilnur Zakarin (RUS)	Team Katusha	+ 1' 41"
8	Chris Froome (GBR)	Team Sky	+ 1' 45"
9	Romain Bardet (FRA)	AG2R La Mondiale	+ 1' 45"
10	Dan Martin (IRL)	Etixx–Quick-Step	+1' 45"

General classification after Stage 4
Rank	Rider	Team	Time
1	Nairo Quintana (COL)	Movistar Team	19hr 01' 43"
2	Alberto Contador (ESP)	Tinkoff	+ 8"
3	Richie Porte (AUS)	BMC Racing Team	+ 17"
4	Dan Martin (IRL)	Etixx–Quick-Step	+ 24"
5	Tejay van Garderen (USA)	BMC Racing Team	+ 27"
6	Romain Bardet (FRA)	AG2R La Mondiale	+ 32"
7	Ilnur Zakarin (RUS)	Team Katusha	+ 42"
8	Chris Froome (GBR)	Team Sky	+ 46"
9	Hugh Carthy (GBR)	Caja Rural–Seguros RGA	+ 1'01"
10	Rigoberto Urán (COL)	Cannondale	+ 1'16"

=== Stage 5 ===
25 March, Rialp to Valls, 187.2 km (116.3 mi)

After two consecutive summit finishes, the fifth stage was simpler, with a 187.2-kilometre (116.3 mi) stage with just two categorised climbs. The route took the riders south from Rialp to Valls. The first 65 kilometres (40 mi) of the stage was fairly flat, before the second-category Port d'Àger climb. The roads continued to be flat until the final 40 kilometres (25 mi) of the stage. First there was an uncategorised climb with a summit around 35 kilometres (22 mi) before the finish. Then, in the final 15 kilometres (9.3 mi), there was the Alt de Lilla, a 4.1-kilometre (2.5 mi), second-category climb with an average gradient of 4.8%. After the final descent, the road slightly descended to the finish.

No breakaway was formed in the first two-and-a-half hours of racing. Dan Martin won the day's first intermediate sprint, earning him three bonus seconds, with Contador taking one second for third place at the sprint. Eventually, after more than 100 kilometres (62 mi) of racing, a seven-rider breakaway was formed. The riders in the breakaway were Carlos Verona (Etixx–Quick-Step), Dario Cataldo (Astana), Jan Polanc (Lampre–Mérida), Kanstantsin Sivtsov (Dimension Data), Tosh Van der Sande (Lotto–Soudal), and Gaëtan Bille and Frederik Veuchelen (both Wanty–Groupe Gobert). With 15 kilometres (9.3 mi) remaining, the breakaway had two minutes' lead. On the Alt de Lilla, Poels attacked alone. At the summit, Poels had a lead of 20 seconds over the other breakaway riders. Cataldo and Verona attempted to chase him down, but their failure to collaborate in the chase meant that Sivtsov and Bille were able to catch them; Poels's lead extended to 30 seconds. In the final kilometres, the chase group got closer to him, but he was able to take the stage win, eleven seconds ahead of the chasing group.

In the main peloton, Quintana followed Contador on the climb. Daniel Navarro (Cofidis), Rigoberto Urán (Cannondale) and Romain Bardet (AG2R La Mondiale) all attempted attacks but were unable to escape. The peloton of 66 riders finished 33 seconds behind Poels, with no change to the overall standings.

Result of Stage 5
Rank	Rider	Team	Time
1	Wout Poels (NED)	Team Sky	3hr 59' 03"
2	Dario Cataldo (ITA)	Astana	+ 11"
3	Gaëtan Bille (BEL)	Wanty–Groupe Gobert	+ 11"
4	Kanstantsin Sivtsov (BLR)	Team Dimension Data	+ 11"
5	Carlos Verona (ESP)	Etixx–Quick-Step	+ 13"
6	Simon Gerrans (AUS)	Orica–GreenEDGE	+ 33"
7	Alexey Tsatevich (RUS)	Team Katusha	+ 33"
8	Enrico Gasparotto (ITA)	Wanty–Groupe Gobert	+ 33"
9	Davide Cimolai (ITA)	Lampre–Merida	+ 33"
10	Ben Swift (GBR)	Team Sky	+33"

General classification after Stage 5
Rank	Rider	Team	Time
1	Nairo Quintana (COL)	Movistar Team	23hr 01' 19"
2	Alberto Contador (ESP)	Tinkoff	+ 7"
3	Richie Porte (AUS)	BMC Racing Team	+ 17"
4	Dan Martin (IRL)	Etixx–Quick-Step	+ 21"
5	Tejay van Garderen (USA)	BMC Racing Team	+ 27"
6	Romain Bardet (FRA)	AG2R La Mondiale	+ 32"
7	Ilnur Zakarin (RUS)	Team Katusha	+ 42"
8	Chris Froome (GBR)	Team Sky	+ 46"
9	Hugh Carthy (GBR)	Caja Rural–Seguros RGA	+ 1'01"
10	Rigoberto Urán (COL)	Cannondale	+ 1'16"

=== Stage 6 ===
26 March, Sant Joan Despí to Vilanova i la Geltrú, 197.2 km (122.5 mi)

The sixth stage took the riders 197.2 kilometres (122.5 mi) from Sant Joan Despí to Vilanova i la Geltrú. The riders initially travelled along the coast, crossing the third-category Alt de la Maradona, then turned inland for a long loop. The day's most significant climb, the second-category Alt de la Ventoses, came after 110 kilometres (68 mi), but the roads were otherwise mainly flat. The route turned back towards the coast to the finish.

One of the principal sprinters left in the race, Sky's Ben Swift, pulled out of the stage before the start due to illness. There was again a fast start to the stage. Riders attempted to form a breakaway, but the teams with overall favourites sought to give their riders a chance at contesting the intermediate sprint that came after 12 kilometres (7.5 mi). The sprint was won by Dan Martin, putting him just one second off the overall podium. After another 50 kilometres (31 mi) of racing, the day's breakaway was finally formed by eleven riders: Petr Vakoč (Etixx–Quick-Step), Esteban Chaves (Orica–GreenEDGE), Laurens Ten Dam (Giant–Alpecin), Ryder Hesjedal (Trek–Segafredo), Bert-Jan Lindeman (LottoNL–Jumbo), Alex Howes (Cannondale), Cameron Meyer (Dimension Data), Axel Domont (AG2R La Mondiale), Romain Hardy and Rudy Molard (both Cofidis), and Marco Minnaard (Wanty–Groupe Gobert). Around halfway through the stage, they had a lead of five minutes but, due to the flat terrain, there were several teams with sprinters who were determined to bring the break back. Lampre–Mérida did most of the work at the front of the peloton; several riders also fell away from the breakaway during the course of the stage. In the final 30 kilometres (19 mi), Trek–Segafredo joined in the chase; Tinkoff then tried to split the peloton in the crosswinds but were unsuccessful.

With 15 kilometres (9.3 mi) remaining, the breakaway had a 40-second lead. Vakoč made a failed attempt at a solo attack; the lead was reduced to 20 seconds with 7 kilometres (4.3 mi) remaining. Meyer, Lindeman, Vakoč and Molard attacked again and stayed clear of the peloton into the final kilometre. The chasing group was close, however, and Meyer made another attack; he was caught in the final 100 metres (330 ft). Davide Cimolai (Lampre–Mérida) used the slipstream of the breakaway riders to launch his sprint and won the stage comfortably. It was Cimolai's first ever World Tour victory, and Lampre–Mérida's first victory at any level in 2016.

Result of Stage 6
Rank	Rider	Team	Time
1	Davide Cimolai (ITA)	Lampre–Merida	4h 35' 13"
2	Nikias Arndt (GER)	Team Giant–Alpecin	+ 0"
3	Tosh Van der Sande (BEL)	Lotto–Soudal	+ 0"
4	Simon Gerrans (AUS)	Orica–GreenEDGE	+ 0"
5	Daryl Impey (RSA)	Orica–GreenEDGE	+ 0"
6	Petr Vakoč (CZE)	Etixx–Quick-Step	+ 0"
7	Alexey Tsatevich (RUS)	Team Katusha	+ 0"
8	Jonas van Genechten (BEL)	IAM Cycling	+ 0"
9	Bert-Jan Lindeman (NED)	LottoNL–Jumbo	+ 0"
10	Lorrenzo Manzin (FRA)	FDJ	+ 0"

General classification after Stage 6
Rank	Rider	Team	Time
1	Nairo Quintana (COL)	Movistar Team	27hr 36' 32"
2	Alberto Contador (ESP)	Tinkoff	+ 7"
3	Richie Porte (AUS)	BMC Racing Team	+ 17"
4	Dan Martin (IRL)	Etixx–Quick-Step	+ 18"
5	Tejay van Garderen (USA)	BMC Racing Team	+ 27"
6	Romain Bardet (FRA)	AG2R La Mondiale	+ 31"
7	Ilnur Zakarin (RUS)	Team Katusha	+ 42"
8	Chris Froome (GBR)	Team Sky	+ 46"
9	Hugh Carthy (GBR)	Caja Rural–Seguros RGA	+ 1'01"
10	Rigoberto Urán (COL)	Cannondale	+ 1'16"

=== Stage 7 ===
Profile of Stage 7

27 March, Barcelona to Barcelona, 136.4 km (84.8 mi)

The final stage followed a 136.4-kilometre (84.8 mi) course that started and finished in Barcelona. The stage began by taking the riders north out of the city as far as Ullastrell, where there was a second-category climb. The route then turned back south, crossing a third-category climb as it returned to Barcelona after 80 kilometres (50 mi) of racing. There were then eight laps of a 6.5-kilometre (4.0 mi) finishing circuit, each lap including the third-category climb of the Alt de Montjuïc.

Early in the stage, Dan Martin came third in an intermediate sprint, giving him a bonus second. He was level on time with Porte, but moved ahead of him into third place thanks to his better placings through the race. There was then a 12-man breakaway, whose lead was over three minutes at the start of the first circuit. There were attacks in the breakaway group from Lluis Mas (Caja Rural–Seguros RGA) and Matej Mohorič (Lampre–Mérida). In the peloton, there was a brief attack by Contador, then a more significant attack from Fabio Aru. Aru was joined by Barguil and Vervaeke and they gained half a minute. They were brought back by Quintana's Movistar team; Froome then immediately made an attack. Quintana chased the move down himself, with Contador, Rodríguez and Navarro following, and the group was caught by the peloton. Hugh Carthy (Caja Rural–Seguros RGA) also made an unsuccessful attack.

Mohorič was passed by Alexey Tsatevich (Katusha) and Primož Roglič (LottoNL–Jumbo), who went on to contest a two-man sprint. Tsatevich won the sprint, despite an early celebration that nearly allowed Roglič to come past him. The peloton finished together, 14 seconds behind, with Jarlinson Pantano (IAM) winning the sprint for third place. Quintana therefore sealed his overall victory, with Contador second and Martin third.

Result of Stage 7
Rank	Rider	Team	Time
1	Alexey Tsatevich (RUS)	Team Katusha	3h 13' 33"
2	Primož Roglič (SLO)	LottoNL–Jumbo	+ 0"
3	Jarlinson Pantano (COL)	IAM Cycling	+ 14"
4	Wout Poels (NED)	Team Sky	+ 14"
5	Daryl Impey (RSA)	Orica–GreenEDGE	+ 14"
6	Rigoberto Urán (COL)	Cannondale	+ 14"
7	Rudy Molard (FRA)	Cofidis	+ 14"
8	Romain Bardet (FRA)	AG2R La Mondiale	+ 14"
9	Enrico Gasparotto (ITA)	Wanty–Groupe Gobert	+ 14"
10	Carlos Barbero (ESP)	Caja Rural–Seguros RGA	+ 14"

Final General classification
Rank	Rider	Team	Time
1	Nairo Quintana (COL)	Movistar Team	27h 36' 32"
2	Alberto Contador (ESP)	Tinkoff	+ 7"
3	Dan Martin (IRL)	Etixx–Quick-Step	+ 17"
4	Richie Porte (AUS)	BMC Racing Team	+ 17"
5	Tejay van Garderen (USA)	BMC Racing Team	+ 27"
6	Romain Bardet (FRA)	AG2R La Mondiale	+ 31"
7	Ilnur Zakarin (RUS)	Team Katusha	+ 42"
8	Chris Froome (GBR)	Team Sky	+ 46"
9	Hugh Carthy (GBR)	Caja Rural–Seguros RGA	+ 1'01"
10	Rigoberto Urán (COL)	Cannondale	+ 1'16"

== Post-race analysis ==
=== Reactions ===
Quintana described himself as "very pleased and proud" with his victory, describing it as one of the toughest races of his career, especially after his team was reduced to five riders in the final stages. He said, however, that he did not believe he was significantly ahead of Contador, Froome or his other rivals for the major races later in the season, saying that "there's a long way to go for the Tour". Contador, meanwhile, described himself as "very happy with how I'm feeling", though he described it as a "pity" that he had lost Paris–Nice by four seconds and the Volta a Catalunya by seven. He suggested that he could have won the race had he ridden differently on Stage 4 to Port-Ainé. Nicolas Portal, Chris Froome's directeur sportif, described his form as "very encouraging", saying that all he lacked was the top-end speed when the other riders accelerated at the end of the mountain stages. One other prominent performance was that of Hugh Carthy, who finished ninth overall and won the young rider classification. He described it as "by far the best [he'd] ever performed"; Cyclingnews.com described it as a "breakthrough performance".

=== UCI World Tour standings ===
The top ten riders in the Volta a Catalunya general classification were awarded points in the 2016 UCI World Tour competition. Points were also awarded for finishing in the top five places on each stage. With the points from the Volta, Quintana entered the rankings in eighth place, while Contador moved from tenth to third. Despite his fourth place, Porte was unable to defend his first place in the rankings, as Peter Sagan (Tinkoff) had won points from both the E3 Harelbeke and the Gent–Wevelgem and moved into the lead. Tinkoff also moved into the lead of the teams' rankings, while Australia remained top in the nations' rankings.

UCI World Tour standings on 27 March 2016
Rank	Rider	Team	Points
1	Peter Sagan (SVK)	Tinkoff	229
2	Richie Porte (AUS)	BMC Racing Team	222
3	Alberto Contador (ESP)	Tinkoff	171
4	Greg Van Avermaet (BEL)	BMC Racing Team	162
5	Arnaud Démare (FRA)	FDJ	137
6	Sergio Henao (COL)	Team Sky	115
7	Simon Gerrans (AUS)	Orica–GreenEDGE	113
8	Nairo Quintana (COL)	Movistar Team	104
9	Geraint Thomas (GBR)	Team Sky	104
10	Michał Kwiatkowski (POL)	Team Sky	102

== Classifications ==
In the 2016 Volta a Catalunya, four different jerseys were awarded. The most important of these was the general classification, calculated by adding each rider's finishing times on each stage. Time bonuses were awarded to the first three riders at the intermediate sprints on each stage (3, 2 and 1 seconds respectively) and at each stage finish (10, 6 and 4 seconds). The leader wore a white and green jersey. A related competition was the youth classification: the highest-ranked rider born after 1 January 1991 was the leader of this classification and wore a "design" jersey.

Additionally, there was a sprints classification, the leader of which was awarded a white jersey. In the sprints classification, riders received points for finishing in the top three at intermediate sprint points during each stage. There was also a mountains classification, the leadership of which was marked by a red jersey. Points for this classification were won by the first riders to the top of each categorised climb, with more points available for the higher-categorised climbs.

There was also a classification for teams, in which the times of the best three cyclists per team on each stage were added together; the leading team at the end of the race was the team with the lowest total time.

=== Classification leadership table ===
Stage	Winner	General classification	Mountains classification	Sprints classification	Young rider classification	Teams classification
1	Nacer Bouhanni	Nacer Bouhanni	Cameron Meyer	Thomas De Gendt	Louis Vervaeke	Team Giant–Alpecin
2	Nacer Bouhanni	Nacer Bouhanni	Boris Dron	Thomas De Gendt	Louis Vervaeke	Team Sky
3	Dan Martin	Dan Martin	Boris Dron	Thomas De Gendt	Davide Formolo	BMC Racing Team
4	Thomas De Gendt	Nairo Quintana	Thomas De Gendt	Thomas De Gendt	Hugh Carthy	BMC Racing Team
5	Wout Poels	Nairo Quintana	Thomas De Gendt	Thomas De Gendt	Hugh Carthy	BMC Racing Team
6	Davide Cimolai	Nairo Quintana	Thomas De Gendt	Thomas De Gendt	Hugh Carthy	BMC Racing Team
7	Alexey Tsatevich	Nairo Quintana	Thomas De Gendt	Thomas De Gendt	Hugh Carthy	BMC Racing Team
Final		Nairo Quintana	Thomas De Gendt	Thomas De Gendt	Hugh Carthy	BMC Racing Team

=== Final classifications ===
Final general classification (top 10)
Rank	Rider	Team	Time
1	Nairo Quintana (COL)	Movistar Team	30h 50' 19"
2	Alberto Contador (ESP)	Tinkoff	+ 7"
3	Dan Martin (IRL)	Etixx–Quick-Step	+ 17"
4	Richie Porte (AUS)	BMC Racing Team	+ 17"
5	Tejay van Garderen (USA)	BMC Racing Team	+ 27"
6	Romain Bardet (FRA)	AG2R La Mondiale	+ 31"
7	Ilnur Zakarin (RUS)	Team Katusha	+ 42"
8	Chris Froome (GBR)	Team Sky	+ 46"
9	Hugh Carthy (GBR)	Caja Rural–Seguros RGA	+ 1' 01"
10	Rigoberto Urán (COL)	Cannondale	+ 1' 16"

Result of mountains classification (top 10)
Rank	Rider	Team	Points
1	Thomas De Gendt (BEL)	Lotto–Soudal	117
2	Boris Dron (BEL)	Wanty–Groupe Gobert	97
3	Pieter Weening (NED)	Roompot–Oranje Peloton	66
4	Alberto Contador (ESP)	Tinkoff	56
5	Nairo Quintana (COL)	Movistar Team	53
6	Richie Porte (AUS)	BMC Racing Team	52
7	Tejay van Garderen (USA)	BMC Racing Team	40
8	Alexey Tsatevich (RUS)	Team Katusha	40
9	Dan Martin (IRL)	Etixx–Quick-Step	38
10	Lluís Mas (ESP)	Caja Rural–Seguros RGA	34

Result of sprints classification (top 8)
Rank	Rider	Team	Points
1	Thomas De Gendt (BEL)	Lotto–Soudal	15
2	Koen Bouwman (NED)	LottoNL–Jumbo	9
3	Dan Martin (IRE)	Etixx–Quick-Step	7
4	Alexey Tsatevich (RUS)	Team Katusha	4
5	Bert-Jan Lindeman (NED)	LottoNL–Jumbo	3
6	Carlos Verona (ESP)	Etixx–Quick-Step	3
7	Louis Vervaeke (BEL)	Lotto–Soudal	3
8	Lluís Mas (ESP)	Caja Rural–Seguros RGA	3

Result of youth classification (top 10)
Rank	Rider	Team	Time
1	Hugh Carthy (GBR)	Caja Rural–Seguros RGA	30h 51' 20"
2	Davide Formolo (ITA)	Cannondale	+ 44"
3	Louis Vervaeke (BEL)	Lotto–Soudal	+ 1' 11"
4	Merhawi Kudus (ERI)	Team Dimension Data	+ 1' 22"
5	Warren Barguil (FRA)	Team Giant–Alpecin	+ 1' 45"
6	Antonio Molina (ESP)	Caja Rural–Seguros RGA	+ 3' 07"
7	Carlos Verona (ESP)	Etixx–Quick-Step	+ 4' 10"
8	Joe Dombrowski (USA)	Cannondale	+ 9' 21"
9	Miguel Ángel López (COL)	Astana	+ 14' 30"
10	Nate Brown (USA)	Cannondale	+ 16' 41"

Result of team classification (top 10)
Rank	Team	Time
1	BMC Racing Team	92h 34' 46"
2	Cannondale	+ 1' 08"
3	Team Katusha	+ 4' 22"
4	AG2R La Mondiale	+ 5' 50"
5	Caja Rural–Seguros RGA	+ 6' 40"
6	Astana	+ 6' 46"
7	Lotto–Soudal	+ 7' 09"
8	Team Sky	+ 8' 03"
9	Movistar Team	+ 9' 44"
10	IAM Cycling	+ 15' 01"
