= Port Ainé =

Ski resort in Rialp in the Catalan Pyrenees

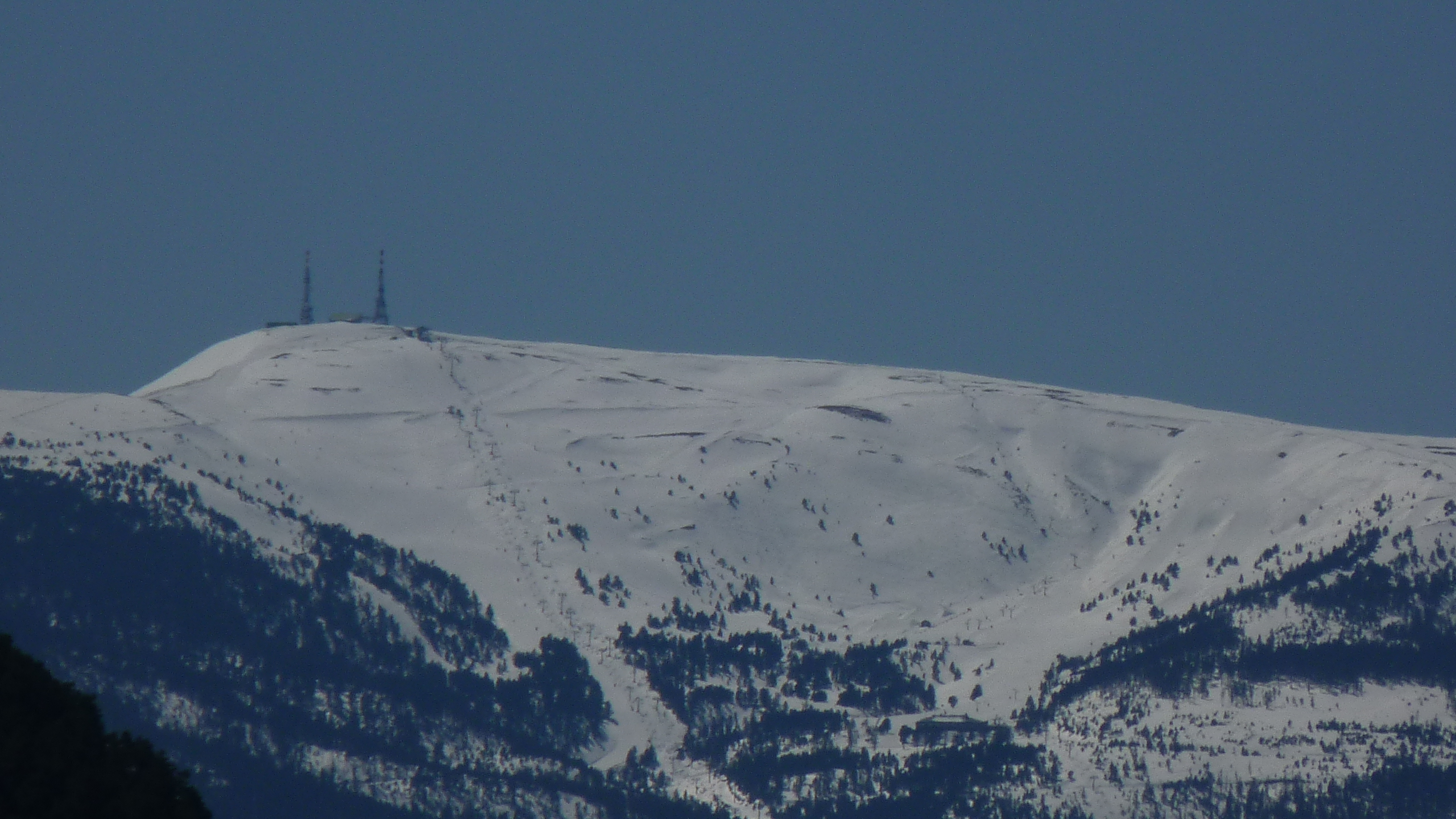
- Port Ainé ski resort, seen from the Cardós Valley

- Location within Spain Location within Catalonia Location within Pyrenees
- Location: Rialp
- Nearest city: Rialp, Catalonia (Spain)
- Coordinates: 42°25′42″N 1°12′43″E
- Top elevation: 2,440 m (8,010 ft)
- Base elevation: 1,650 m (5,410 ft)
- Skiable area: 32.5
- Trails: Black: 6 Red: 7 Blue: 2 Green: 7; 22 Total
- Lift system: 8 Total (3 Chairlifts, 3 Platter lifts, 2 Carpets)
- Lift capacity: 11,850 skiers an hour
- Website: website

Port Ainé is a ski resort located in Rialp, in the Catalan Pyrenees, inaugurated in 1986. The ski area extends from 1,650 to 2,440 meters.

== Cycling ==
Port Ainé
- Location: Catalonia
- Gain in altitude: 1,199 m (3,934 ft)
- Length of climb: 18.7 km (11.6 mi)
- Maximum elevation: 1,947 m (6,388 ft)
- Average gradient: 6.8 %
- Maximum gradient: 12 %

In March 2013, Port Aîné hosted the fourth stage of the Volta a Catalunya . Daniel Martin won at the top ahead of Joaquim Rodríguez and at the same time became the leader of the race. In 2016, the resort received the final of a new stage of the Tour de Catalogne during the 4th stage. Thomas De Gendt won after a breakaway while Nairo Quintana managed to grab the leader's jersey he took from Dan Martin by releasing the other favorites Richie Porte and Alberto Contador in the last kilometer. Esteban Chaves won the stage finishing at Port Ainé in the 2021 edition and Tadej Pogačar in 2024.
