= Team BikeExchange =

Team BikeExchange can refer to:

- Team BikeExchange (men's team)
  - 2021 Team BikeExchange (men's team) season
- Team BikeExchange (women's team)
