= 2021 Team BikeExchange (men's team) season =

Team BikeExchange
- 2021 season
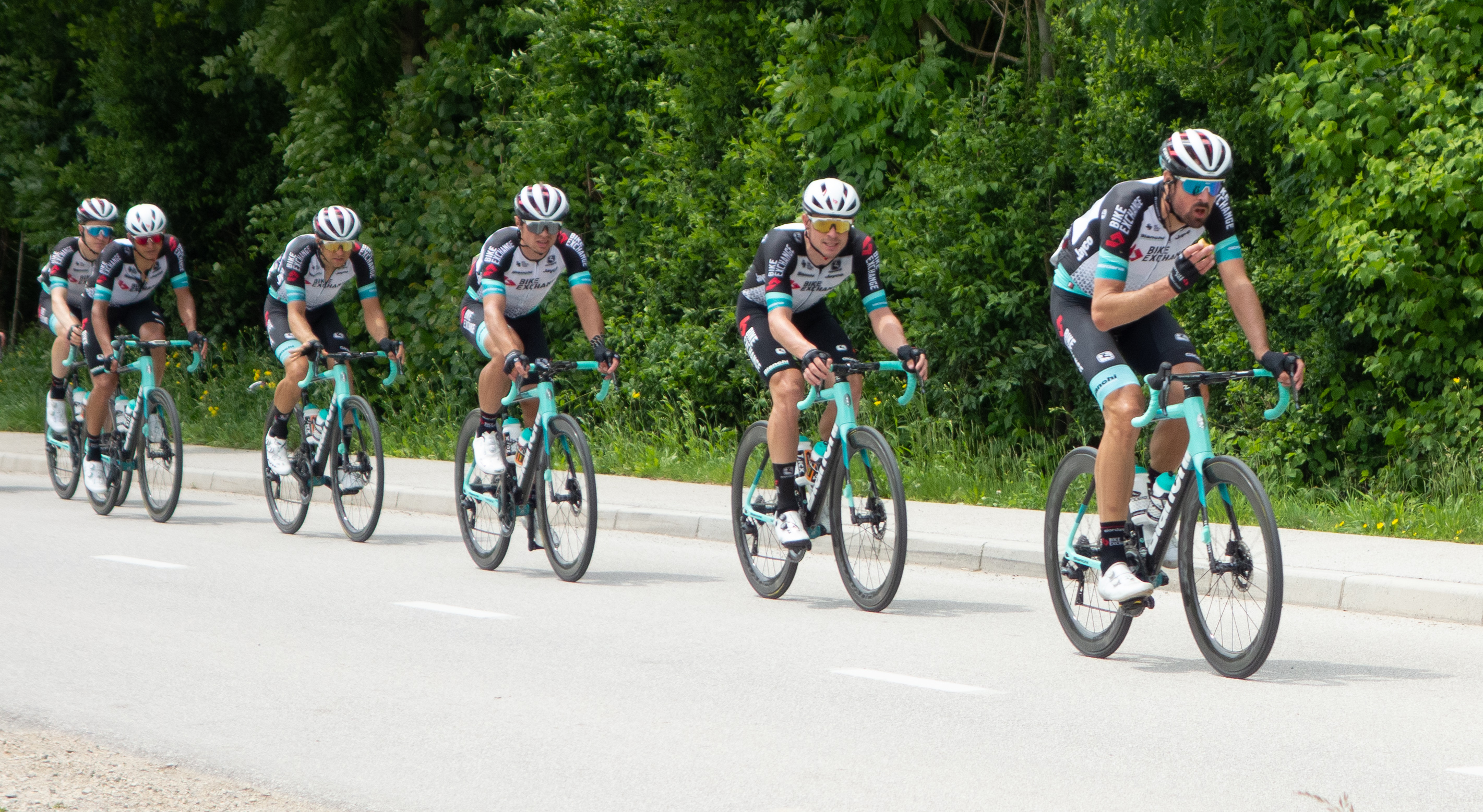
- Team BikeExchange on Stage 2 of the Tour of Slovenia
- UCI code: BEX
- Status: UCI WorldTeam
- World Tour Rank: 19th
- Owner: Gerry Ryan
- Manager: Brent Copeland (RSA)
- Main sponsor(s): BikeExchange
- Based: Australia
- Bicycles: Bianchi
- Groupset: Shimano

Season victories
- Stage race overall: 2
- Stage race stages: 6
- National Championships: 1
- Most wins: Simon Yates (GBR) (4)
- Best ranked rider: Simon Yates (GBR) (36th)
- Jersey

The 2021 season for the Team BikeExchange team was the team's 10th season in existence, all of which have been as a UCI WorldTeam.

Ahead of the season, Scott Sports, one of the co-title sponsors from the previous season, was dropped as the team switched to Bianchi Bicycles, though Bianchi did not become a title sponsor. Additionally, Mitchelton Wines, a brand owned by team owner Gerry Ryan, was also dropped from co-title sponsor after three years. It was replaced by Australian cycling retailer BikeExchange, another Ryan brand which had previously been co-title sponsor for the 2016 season and which became the sole title sponsor.

== Team roster ==
As of 1 December 2021.

Rider	Date of birth
Jack Bauer (NZL)	7 April 1985 (aged 35)
Sam Bewley (NZL)	22 July 1987 (aged 33)
Brent Bookwalter (USA)	16 February 1984 (aged 36)
Kevin Colleoni (ITA)	11 November 1999 (aged 21)
Esteban Chaves (COL)	17 January 1990 (aged 30)
Luke Durbridge (AUS)	9 April 1991 (aged 29)
Alex Edmondson (AUS)	22 December 1993 (aged 27)
Goh Choon Huat (Note: Goh joined as a stagiaire on 1 August from Terengganu Cycling Team.) (SIN)	14 December 1990 (aged 30)
Tsgabu Grmay (ETH)	25 August 1991 (aged 29)
Kaden Groves (AUS)	23 December 1998 (aged 22)
Lucas Hamilton (AUS)	12 February 1996 (aged 24)
Michael Hepburn (AUS)	17 August 1991 (aged 29)
Damien Howson (AUS)	13 August 1992 (aged 28)
Amund Grøndahl Jansen (NOR)	11 February 1994 (aged 26)
Christopher Juul-Jensen (DEN)	6 July 1989 (aged 31)

Rider	Date of birth
Tanel Kangert (EST)	11 March 1987 (aged 33)
Alexander Konychev (ITA)	25 July 1998 (aged 22)
Michael Matthews (AUS)	26 September 1990 (aged 30)
Cameron Meyer (AUS)	11 January 1988 (aged 32)
Luka Mezgec (SLO)	27 June 1988 (aged 32)
Mikel Nieve (ESP)	26 May 1984 (aged 36)
Kelland O'Brien (Note: O'Brien joined as a stagiaire from the St Kilda Cycling Club.) (AUS)	22 May 1998 (aged 22)
Barnabás Peák (HUN)	29 November 1998 (aged 22)
Nick Schultz (AUS)	13 September 1994 (aged 26)
Callum Scotson (AUS)	10 August 1996 (aged 24)
Dion Smith (NZL)	3 March 1993 (aged 27)
Robert Stannard (AUS)	16 September 1998 (aged 22)
Simon Yates (GBR)	7 August 1992 (aged 28)
Andrey Zeits (KAZ)	14 December 1986 (aged 34)

Riders who joined the team for the 2021 season

Rider	2020 team
Kevin Colleoni	neo-pro (Biesse–Arvedi)
Amund Grøndahl Jansen	Team Jumbo–Visma
Tanel Kangert	EF Pro Cycling
Michael Matthews	Team Sunweb

Riders who left the team during or after the 2020 season

Rider	2021 team
Edoardo Affini	Team Jumbo–Visma
Michael Albasini	Retired
Jack Haig	Team Bahrain Victorious
Daryl Impey	Israel Start-Up Nation
Adam Yates	Ineos Grenadiers

== Season victories ==
Date	Race	Competition	Rider	Country	Location	Ref.
25 March	Volta a Catalunya, Stage 4	UCI World Tour	Esteban Chaves (COL)	Spain	Port Ainé (Pallars Sobirà)	
28 March	Volta a Catalunya, Points classification	UCI World Tour	Esteban Chaves (COL)	Spain		
28 March	Volta a Catalunya, Mountains classification	UCI World Tour	Esteban Chaves (COL)	Spain		
20 April	Tour of the Alps, Stage 2	UCI Europe Tour; UCI ProSeries	Simon Yates (GBR)	Austria	Feichten im Kaunertal	
23 April	Tour of the Alps, Overall	UCI Europe Tour; UCI ProSeries	Simon Yates (GBR)	Austria		
15 May	Tour de Hongrie, Stage 4	UCI Europe Tour	Damien Howson (AUS)	Hungary	Gyöngyös (Kékestető)	
16 May	Tour de Hongrie, Overall	UCI Europe Tour	Damien Howson (AUS)	Hungary		
28 May	Giro d'Italia, Stage 19	UCI World Tour	Simon Yates (GBR)	Italy	Alpe di Mera (Valsesia)	
6 August	Sazka Tour, Stage 2	UCI Europe Tour	Nick Schultz (AUS)	Czech Republic	Pustevny	
15 September	Okolo Slovenska, Prologue (ITT)	UCI Europe Tour	Kaden Groves (AUS)	Slovakia	Košice	
3 October	CRO Race, Mountains classification	UCI Europe Tour	Simon Yates (GBR)	Croatia		

== National, Continental, and World Champions ==
Date	Discipline	Jersey	Rider	Country	Location	Ref.
7 February	Australian National Road Race Championships		Cameron Meyer (AUS)	Australia	Buninyong	
