= 2013 Volta a Catalunya =

2013 UCI World Tour, race 5 of 28
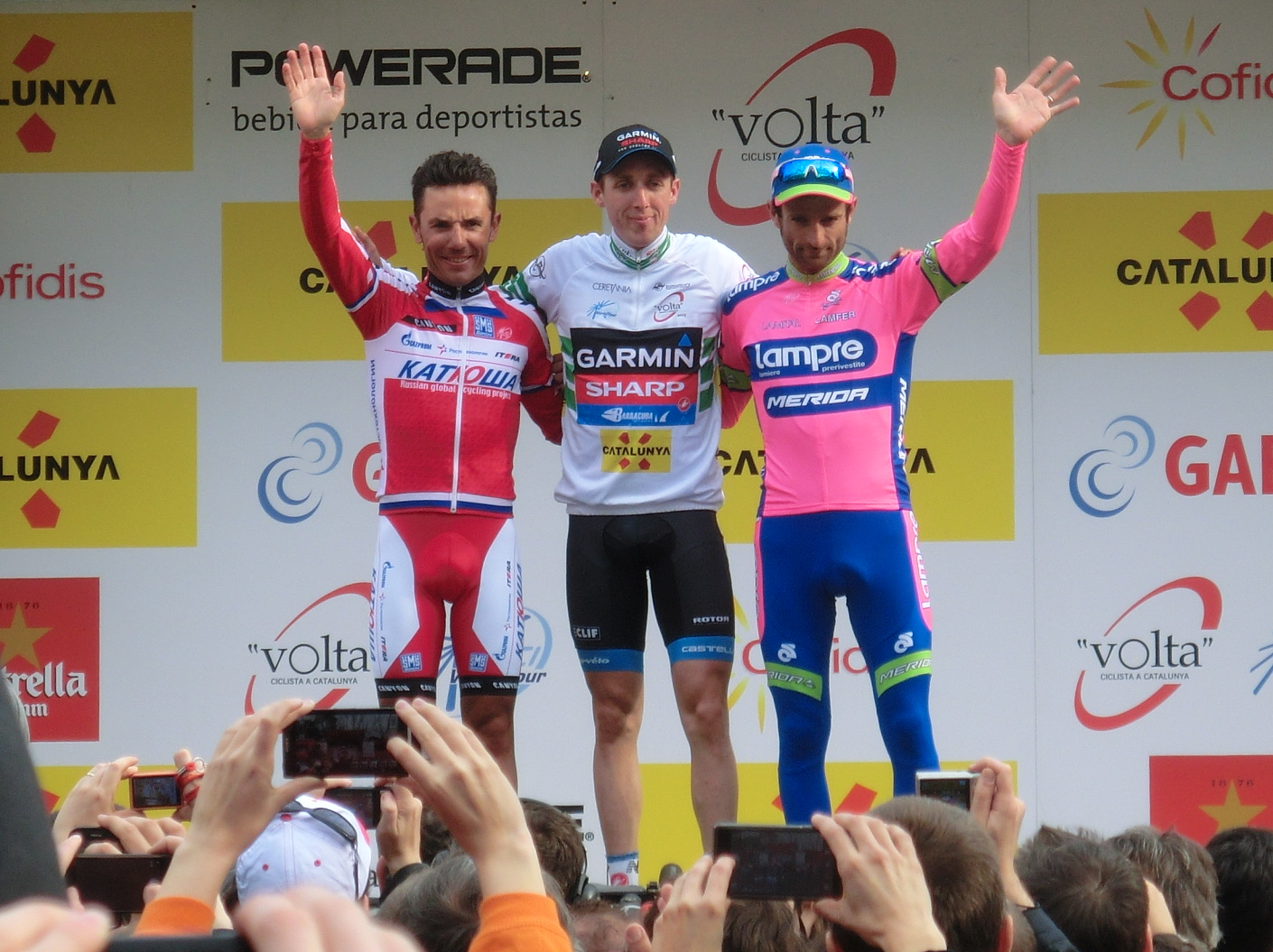
- The final general classification podium

Race details
- Dates: 18–24 March 2013
- Stages: 7
- Distance: 1,175.9 km (730.7 mi)
- Winning time: 29h 02' 25"

Results
Jersey awarded to the overall winner	Winner	Dan Martin (Republic of Ireland)	(Garmin–Sharp)
	Second	Joaquim Rodríguez (Spain)	(Team Katusha)
	Third	Michele Scarponi (Italy)	(Lampre–Merida)
Jersey awarded to the mountains classification winner	Mountains	Cristiano Salerno (Italy)	(Cannondale)
Jersey awarded to the sprints classification winner	Sprints	Christian Meier (Canada)	(Orica–GreenEDGE)
	Team	Garmin–Sharp	

The 2013 Volta a Catalunya was the 93rd running of the Volta a Catalunya cycling stage race. It started on 18 March in Calella, ended on 24 March in Barcelona, and consisted of seven stages. It was the fifth race of the 2013 UCI World Tour season.

The race was won by the Republic of Ireland's Dan Martin of the Garmin–Sharp team, who took the lead after winning the race's queen stage – the fourth stage – to Port Ainé–Rialp, and maintained the overall lead of the race until the end. As a result, Martin – who had previously finished the race in second place twice and fourth place over the previous four years – became the second Irish rider to win the race after Sean Kelly, who won the race in 1984 and 1986. Martin won the general classification by 17 seconds over runner-up Joaquim Rodríguez (Team Katusha), while Lampre–Merida's Michele Scarponi completed the podium, 17 seconds behind Rodríguez and 34 seconds down on Martin; Scarponi had started the final stage in fifth place, but moved up after proficient attacking on the closing circuits at Barcelona's Montjuïc hill.

The race's other classifications were dominated by the members of the race's opening stage breakaway; Cannondale's Cristiano Salerno was the winner of the red jersey for the mountains classification, while Christian Meier (Orica–GreenEDGE) was the winner of the white jersey for the sprints classification, as well as the yellow jersey for a special sprints classification, honouring the 100th edition of the Tour de France to be held later in the year. Garmin–Sharp were the winners of the teams classification, after also placing Tom Danielson in the top ten overall.

== Teams ==
As the Volta a Catalunya was a UCI World Tour event, all UCI ProTeams were invited automatically and obligated to send a squad. Originally, eighteen ProTeams were invited to the race, with four other squads given wildcard places, and as such, would have formed the event's 22-team peloton. Team Katusha subsequently regained their ProTour status after an appeal to the Court of Arbitration for Sport.

The 22 teams that competed in the race were:

- Ag2r–La Mondiale
- Argos–Shimano
- Astana
- Blanco Pro Cycling
- BMC Racing Team
- Caja Rural–Seguros RGA
- Cannondale
- Cofidis
- Euskaltel–Euskadi
- FDJ
- Garmin–Sharp
- Team Katusha
- Lampre–Merida
- Lotto–Belisol
- Movistar Team
- Omega Pharma–Quick-Step
- Orica–GreenEDGE
- RadioShack–Leopard
- Saxo–Tinkoff
- Team Sky
- Sojasun
- Vacansoleil–DCM

Among the 174-rider start list – each team entered eight riders with the exception of Lampre–Merida and Orica–GreenEDGE, who entered seven – were four previous winners of the race. 2007 winner Vladimir Karpets served as a domestique for the 2009 winner Alejandro Valverde in the Movistar Team, while 2010 winner Joaquim Rodríguez was one of the pre-race favourites for Team Katusha. The other previous winner, Michele Scarponi – who won the 2011 edition of the race after Alberto Contador's results were expunged – also served as the leader of his team, leading the Lampre–Merida squad.

== Route ==
Stage characteristics and winners
Stage	Date	Course	Distance	Type	Winner
1	18 March	Calella to Calella	153.3 km (95.3 mi)		Gianni Meersman (BEL)
2	19 March	Girona to Banyoles	160.7 km (99.9 mi)		Gianni Meersman (BEL)
3	20 March	Vidreres to Vallter 2000–Setcases	180.1 km (111.9 mi)	Mountain stage	Nairo Quintana (COL)
4	21 March	Llanars–Vall de Camprodon to Port Ainé–Rialp	217.7 km (135.3 mi)	Mountain stage	Dan Martin (IRL)
5	22 March	Rialp to Lleida	156.5 km (97.2 mi)		François Parisien (CAN)
6	23 March	Almacelles to Valls	169.4 km (105.3 mi)		Simon Gerrans (AUS)
7	24 March	El Vendrell to Barcelona (Montjuïc)	122.2 km (75.9 mi)		Thomas De Gendt (BEL)

== Stages ==
=== Stage 1 ===
18 March 2013 — Calella to Calella, 153.3 km (95.3 mi)

For the second successive year, the Volta a Catalunya began with a circuit race around the town of Calella. As part of the itinerary, there were five categorised climbs including three ascents of the third-category Alt de Collsacreu, although the most difficult climb of the stage was the first-category Alt de Montseny climb, measuring 6 km (3.7 mi) at an average gradient of 5.6%. Also part of the route were three sprint points; two for the intermediate sprints classification – in Sant Esteve de Palautordera and Calella respectively – and one towards the special sprints classification, in honour of the 100th anniversary of the Tour de France, coming at the 97 km (60.3 mi) point of the stage, in Tordera. A pair of riders – Orica–GreenEDGE's Christian Meier and Cannondale rider Cristiano Salerno – made the primary breakaway from the field, just after the start of the stage.

The duo managed to extend their advantage over the main field to in excess of eight-and-a-half minutes just after the first intermediate sprint point at Sant Esteve de Palautordera. At this point, Omega Pharma–Quick-Step and the Movistar Team moved their riders to the front of the main field, in order to steadily bring back the lead gap. Meier picked up all the points in relation to the sprints classifications while Salerno accrued enough points in order to pick up the first red jersey as mountains classification leader. The leaders were caught on the day's final climb, the third passage of the Alt de Collsacreu. On the descent, Team Sky forced the pace through Bradley Wiggins, and the acceleration caused a break in the field and allowed thirteen riders to escape off the front. They remained clear all the way to Calella, where Omega Pharma–Quick-Step's Gianni Meersman prevailed in a sprint finish, to take the first leader's jersey via time bonuses.

Stage 1 Result

	Rider	Team	Time
1	Gianni Meersman (BEL)	Omega Pharma–Quick-Step	3h 55' 56"
2	Valerio Agnoli (ITA)	Astana	s.t.
3	Alejandro Valverde (ESP)	Movistar Team	s.t.
4	Dan Martin (IRL)	Garmin–Sharp	s.t.
5	Danilo Wyss (SUI)	BMC Racing Team	s.t.
6	Bradley Wiggins (GBR)	Team Sky	s.t.
7	Robert Gesink (NED)	Blanco Pro Cycling	s.t.
8	Joaquim Rodríguez (ESP)	Team Katusha	s.t.
9	Michele Scarponi (ITA)	Lampre–Merida	s.t.
10	David López (ESP)	Team Sky	s.t.

General Classification after Stage 1

	Rider	Team	Time
1	Gianni Meersman (BEL)	Omega Pharma–Quick-Step	3h 55' 46"
2	Valerio Agnoli (ITA)	Astana	+ 4"
3	Alejandro Valverde (ESP)	Movistar Team	+ 6"
4	Dan Martin (IRL)	Garmin–Sharp	+ 10"
5	Danilo Wyss (SUI)	BMC Racing Team	+ 10"
6	Bradley Wiggins (GBR)	Team Sky	+ 10"
7	Robert Gesink (NED)	Blanco Pro Cycling	+ 10"
8	Joaquim Rodríguez (ESP)	Team Katusha	+ 10"
9	Michele Scarponi (ITA)	Lampre–Merida	+ 10"
10	David López (ESP)	Team Sky	+ 10"

=== Stage 2 ===
19 March 2013 — Girona to Banyoles, 160.7 km (99.9 mi)

The second stage was set up for the sprinters, much like the first stage, with the race returning to Banyoles for a stage finish, after the town was not part of the race in 2012. After starting in Girona, the 160.7 km (99.9 mi) itinerary saw the peloton head south towards the coast at Tossa de Mar; it later remained along the coast until Palamós, before heading north and away from the coast. The course eventually headed towards the finish in Banyoles – around 20 km (12.4 mi) north of Girona – where four laps of a 9.2 km (5.7 mi) circuit were completed before the finish. On the route, there was only one categorised climb – the third-category Mirador de Sant Feliu, just outside Sant Feliu de Guíxols – while there were sprint points in Platja d'Aro and Banyoles, with a special sprint point in between, at the 103.5 km (64.3 mi) mark in Bordils.

For the second day running, Orica–GreenEDGE's Christian Meier was part of the breakaway in order to boost his advantages in both the sprints and special sprints classifications, and to close in on the lead of Cannondale's Cristiano Salerno in the mountains classification. Meier was joined in the breakaway by Sojasun rider Christophe Laborie and Olivier Kaisen of the Lotto–Belisol team, with the trio going clear in the opening moments of the stage. Unlike the previous day, the breakaway was kept in check by the main field – led by the Omega Pharma–Quick-Step team-mates of the racer leader Gianni Meersman – and their maximum advantage over the course of the day was around three minutes. The trio's lead fluctuated between two-and-a-half and three minutes for most of the day, before being caught on the second lap of the Banyoles circuit. Ultimately, it came down to a sprint for the line – after a four-rider move was caught late on – where Blanco Pro Cycling were first to create a move for Robert Wagner but could not sustain the pace. Behind, Omega Pharma–Quick-Step took up the front with Andrew Fenn, and set it up for Meersman, who held off a late spurt from Daniele Ratto (Cannondale) to take back-to-back stage wins, extending his overall lead in the process.

Stage 2 Result

	Rider	Team	Time
1	Gianni Meersman (BEL)	Omega Pharma–Quick-Step	3h 48' 10"
2	Daniele Ratto (ITA)	Cannondale	s.t.
3	Brett Lancaster (AUS)	Orica–GreenEDGE	s.t.
4	Samuel Dumoulin (FRA)	Ag2r–La Mondiale	s.t.
5	Robert Wagner (GER)	Blanco Pro Cycling	s.t.
6	Julien Simon (FRA)	Sojasun	s.t.
7	Maurits Lammertink (NED)	Vacansoleil–DCM	s.t.
8	Laurent Pichon (FRA)	FDJ	s.t.
9	Danilo Wyss (SUI)	BMC Racing Team	s.t.
10	Manuele Mori (ITA)	Lampre–Merida	s.t.

General Classification after Stage 2

	Rider	Team	Time
1	Gianni Meersman (BEL)	Omega Pharma–Quick-Step	7h 43' 46"
2	Valerio Agnoli (ITA)	Astana	+ 14"
3	Alejandro Valverde (ESP)	Movistar Team	+ 16"
4	Danilo Wyss (SUI)	BMC Racing Team	+ 20"
5	Robert Gesink (NED)	Blanco Pro Cycling	+ 20"
6	Dario Cataldo (ITA)	Team Sky	+ 20"
7	David López (ESP)	Team Sky	+ 20"
8	Bradley Wiggins (GBR)	Team Sky	+ 20"
9	José Herrada (ESP)	Movistar Team	+ 20"
10	Dan Martin (IRL)	Garmin–Sharp	+ 20"

=== Stage 3 ===
20 March 2013 — Vidreres to Vallter 2000–Setcases, 180.1 km (111.9 mi)

The first of two successive summit finishes, the third stage finished 2,200 metres (7,200 ft) above sea level at the ski resort of Vallter 2000 in Setcases, at the top of an hors catégorie ascent. The stage had started just above sea level in Vidreres, taking in two first-category climbs of the Alt de Sant Hilari and at the Túnel Collabós as part of the 180.1 km (111.9 mi) itinerary. Also on the route were intermediate sprint points in Vidreres itself, as well as Sant Esteve d'en Bas, with the special sprint point sandwiched in between, at the 90.5 km (56.2 mi) mark, in Anglès. The final climb to Vallter 2000 was around 12 km (7.5 mi) in length, with an average gradient of around 7.3%, reaching 14% in places. It was expected to shake up the general classification with overall leader Gianni Meersman (Omega Pharma–Quick-Step) unlikely to hold his 14-second lead beyond the stage.

Four riders – Martin Kohler of the BMC Racing Team, Cannondale's Lucas Sebastián Haedo, Karol Domagalski (Caja Rural–Seguros RGA) and Cofidis rider Nicolas Edet – advanced clear of the main field after 7 km (4.3 mi) of the stage, and managed to extend their advantage to a maximum of around seven-and-a-half minutes around 15 km (9.3 mi) later. The quartet remained together until the day's second first-category climb, at the Túnel Collabós, where Edet and Domagalski went on ahead of their two companions. At the summit of the climb, Edet and Domagalski held a lead of around five minutes over the peloton. As the two leaders moved towards the final climb, Haedo and Kohler were gradually being brought back to the main field, and the peloton eventually caught them in between climbs. Edet dropped Domagalski on the lower slopes of the final climb, and he resisted being caught until inside of 5 km (3.1 mi) remaining.

Lotto–Belisol's Jurgen Van den Broeck was first to reach Edet, before Edet exhaustedly faded back to the peloton. Van Den Broeck remained off the front for a couple of kilometres, before Team Katusha and Garmin–Sharp brought him back with added impetus on the front of the main field. The latter squad's protected rider for the race, Tom Danielson – in his first race back after a six-month ban for admitting to doping earlier in his career – attacked before he was brought back shortly after. Bradley Wiggins was next to attack for Team Sky at the flamme rouge, and was closely followed by Movistar Team rider Nairo Quintana. Quintana followed Wiggins up the climb, and blocked off an attack by Joaquim Rodríguez (Team Katusha), and soloed away to a six-second winning margin over team-mate Alejandro Valverde, who also beat Rodríguez and Wiggins to the line. As a result, Valverde assumed the race lead from Meersman, four seconds ahead of both Wiggins and Rodríguez.

Stage 3 Result

	Rider	Team	Time
1	Nairo Quintana (COL)	Movistar Team	5h 01' 20"
2	Alejandro Valverde (ESP)	Movistar Team	+ 6"
3	Joaquim Rodríguez (ESP)	Team Katusha	+ 6"
4	Bradley Wiggins (GBR)	Team Sky	+ 6"
5	Thibaut Pinot (FRA)	FDJ	+ 9"
6	Peter Stetina (USA)	Garmin–Sharp	+ 9"
7	Michele Scarponi (ITA)	Lampre–Merida	+ 9"
8	Przemysław Niemiec (POL)	Lampre–Merida	+ 9"
9	Rigoberto Urán (COL)	Team Sky	+ 9"
10	Domenico Pozzovivo (ITA)	Ag2r–La Mondiale	+ 21"

General Classification after Stage 3

	Rider	Team	Time
1	Alejandro Valverde (ESP)	Movistar Team	12h 45' 28"
2	Bradley Wiggins (GBR)	Team Sky	+ 4"
3	Joaquim Rodríguez (ESP)	Team Katusha	+ 4"
4	Michele Scarponi (ITA)	Lampre–Merida	+ 7"
5	Przemysław Niemiec (POL)	Lampre–Merida	+ 7"
6	Nairo Quintana (COL)	Movistar Team	+ 26"
7	Robert Gesink (NED)	Blanco Pro Cycling	+ 30"
8	David López (ESP)	Team Sky	+ 30"
9	Dan Martin (IRL)	Garmin–Sharp	+ 30"
10	Peter Stetina (USA)	Garmin–Sharp	+ 35"

=== Stage 4 ===
21 March 2013 — Llanars–Vall de Camprodon to Port Ainé–Rialp, 217.7 km (135.3 mi)

The queen stage of the 2013 Volta a Catalunya, the fourth stage was also its longest with the riders enduring a parcours of 217.7 km (135.3 mi) before reaching the summit finish at the Pyrenean ski station of Port Ainé. The climb to Port Ainé was one of five categorised climbs during the stage; of note, were the first-category Alt de Pedraforca climb a third of the way through the stage, as well as the two difficult hors-catégorie climbs of the Port de Cantó – 24.6 km (15.3 mi) at 4.8% – and the climb to Port Ainé, an 18.9 km (11.7 mi) long climb (at an average of 6.5%) with the finish at just below 1,950 metres (6,400 ft) above sea level. Both hors-catégorie climbs had been scheduled to be a part of the queen stage in 2012, but were omitted from the route due to heavy snow, which ultimately led to the stage being shortened, in progress.

The race remained as a whole for the majority of the first hour of racing, with the breakaway only forming on the day's first climb, the Coll de Merolla, around 40 km (24.9 mi) into the stage. Initially, four riders – Astana's Fabio Aru, Ryder Hesjedal of Garmin–Sharp, RadioShack–Leopard rider Robert Kišerlovski and Yuri Trofimov for Team Katusha – got clear on the climb itself and were later joined on the descent by a further nineteen riders, swelling the lead group to a total of twenty-three. With most teams represented in the group, the gap to the peloton was allowed to reach around three minutes before the pace was accelerated. Around the halfway mark, the Movistar Team were reduced by two members, as both Eros Capecchi and the overall leader Alejandro Valverde had to abandon the race due to a crash, leaving both riders sore but unable to continue. Prior to Valverde's withdrawal, the pace dropped in the main field, allowing the breakaway to extend their lead over four minutes for a period.

Team Sky took up the reins on the front of the peloton as the leaders hit the Port de Cantó, reducing the advantage of the leaders to around two-and-a-half minutes with around 50 km (31.1 mi) remaining of the stage. Towards the top of the ascent, Saxo–Tinkoff's Nicolas Roche put in a solo attack on his companions, and built up a lead of around a minute as he hit the bottom of the final climb to Port Ainé. Roche faded on the climb however, and was soon caught by a group of three riders, consisting of his cousin Dan Martin (Garmin–Sharp), Kišerlovski and the Movistar Team's Jesús Herrada. With 7.5 km (4.7 mi) remaining, Martin attacked on his own, and eventually soloed away to the stage victory. His two-minute lead had been cut to just 36 seconds by the time Joaquim Rodríguez (Team Katusha) and Herrada's team-mate Nairo Quintana had crossed the finish, but the advantage was enough for Martin to take the race lead ahead of Rodríguez, by ten seconds.

Stage 4 Result

	Rider	Team	Time
1	Dan Martin (IRL)	Garmin–Sharp	6h 02' 40"
2	Joaquim Rodríguez (ESP)	Team Katusha	+ 36"
3	Nairo Quintana (COL)	Movistar Team	+ 36"
4	Jurgen Van den Broeck (BEL)	Lotto–Belisol	+ 47"
5	Robert Gesink (NED)	Blanco Pro Cycling	+ 51"
6	Bradley Wiggins (GBR)	Team Sky	+ 1' 02"
7	Peter Stetina (USA)	Garmin–Sharp	+ 1' 02"
8	Michele Scarponi (ITA)	Lampre–Merida	+ 1' 02"
9	Tom Danielson (USA)	Garmin–Sharp	+ 1' 02"
10	Thibaut Pinot (FRA)	FDJ	+ 1' 08"

General Classification after Stage 4

	Rider	Team	Time
1	Dan Martin (IRL)	Garmin–Sharp	18h 48' 38"
2	Joaquim Rodríguez (ESP)	Team Katusha	+ 10"
3	Nairo Quintana (COL)	Movistar Team	+ 32"
4	Bradley Wiggins (GBR)	Team Sky	+ 36"
5	Michele Scarponi (ITA)	Lampre–Merida	+ 39"
6	Robert Gesink (NED)	Blanco Pro Cycling	+ 51"
7	Przemysław Niemiec (POL)	Lampre–Merida	+ 1' 00"
8	Peter Stetina (USA)	Garmin–Sharp	+ 1' 07"
9	Thibaut Pinot (FRA)	FDJ	+ 1' 13"
10	Jurgen Van den Broeck (BEL)	Lotto–Belisol	+ 1' 15"

=== Stage 5 ===
22 March 2013 — Rialp to Lleida, 156.5 km (97.2 mi)

After several days in the Pyrenees, the fifth stage of the Volta a Catalunya was a primarily downhill stage from Rialp, travelling 156.5 km (97.2 mi) to the finish in the city of Lleida. There was only one categorised climb during the stage, with the second-category Port d'Âger climb coming around halfway through the stage, but was not seen to be excessively difficult as the average gradient was only 5% over its 9.6 km (6.0 mi) duration. The finish in Lleida was potentially tricky with several roundabouts to navigate on the run-in, but the finish was still suited for the sprinters to prevail over the rest of the field. For the second day running, the field remained together for the first hour of racing, after several attacks were chased down before they could garner a reputable gap. It was not until the 55 km (34.2 mi) mark before the day's primary breakaway was formed.

Two riders ventured clear, as Lotto–Belisol's Olivier Kaisen and Cofidis rider Tristan Valentin moved ahead of the peloton. The duo built up a lead of around four minutes over the course of the following ten kilometres, before stabilising at around three-and-a-half minutes for the majority of the stage. Valentin took maximum points at the two remaining sprint points of the stage, while Kaisen led over the climb. Overall leader Dan Martin (Garmin–Sharp) gained a bonus second at the intermediate sprint in Alfarràs, to extend his lead over Team Katusha's Joaquim Rodríguez. Ultimately, Kaisen and Valentin were caught 15 km (9.3 mi) before the end of the stage, setting up a bunch sprint. Cofidis rider Stéphane Poulhies held the lead of the sprint out of the final right-hand corner, but he was passed before the line by Samuel Dumoulin (Ag2r–La Mondiale), and the stage winner François Parisien of the Argos–Shimano team. Martin finished ninth on the stage, and extended his overall lead by three seconds over Rodríguez, after the group split on the final run-in.

Stage 5 Result

	Rider	Team	Time
1	François Parisien (CAN)	Argos–Shimano	3h 32' 02"
2	Samuel Dumoulin (FRA)	Ag2r–La Mondiale	s.t.
3	Stéphane Poulhies (FRA)	Cofidis	s.t.
4	Daniele Ratto (ITA)	Cannondale	s.t.
5	Danilo Wyss (SUI)	BMC Racing Team	s.t.
6	Andrew Fenn (GBR)	Omega Pharma–Quick-Step	s.t.
7	Gianni Meersman (BEL)	Omega Pharma–Quick-Step	s.t.
8	Maurits Lammertink (NED)	Vacansoleil–DCM	s.t.
9	Dan Martin (IRL)	Garmin–Sharp	s.t.
10	Thomas Damuseau (FRA)	Argos–Shimano	s.t.

General Classification after Stage 5

	Rider	Team	Time
1	Dan Martin (IRL)	Garmin–Sharp	22h 20' 39"
2	Joaquim Rodríguez (ESP)	Team Katusha	+ 14"
3	Nairo Quintana (COL)	Movistar Team	+ 42"
4	Bradley Wiggins (GBR)	Team Sky	+ 46"
5	Michele Scarponi (ITA)	Lampre–Merida	+ 47"
6	Robert Gesink (NED)	Blanco Pro Cycling	+ 59"
7	Przemysław Niemiec (POL)	Lampre–Merida	+ 1' 10"
8	Peter Stetina (USA)	Garmin–Sharp	+ 1' 17"
9	Thibaut Pinot (FRA)	FDJ	+ 1' 23"
10	Jurgen Van den Broeck (BEL)	Lotto–Belisol	+ 1' 25"

=== Stage 6 ===
23 March 2013 — Almacelles to Valls, 178.7 km (111.0 mi)

The penultimate stage of the race was seen as the one that was most suitable for a breakaway move to stick, out of the entire Volta a Catalunya. During an itinerary of 178.7 km (111.0 mi), the stage had a downhill start from Almacelles down towards an intermediate sprint in Alfarràs for the second consecutive day before steadily rising towards the first of two categorised climbs, via the special sprint point in the village of L'Espluga de Francolí. The first-category Alt de Prades was the first test, with an average gradient of 4% over 11 km (6.8 mi), while on the descent, there was the second intermediate sprint in Prades. The second-category Alt de Lilla, the day's other climb, came with just 14.5 km (9.0 mi) remaining, and was slightly steeper at 4.8% over 6.1 km (3.8 mi). From there, the race descended into the town of Valls, and to the finish in front of the sports centre named in honour of former Spanish cyclist Xavier Tondo; Tondo, who was from Valls, died in 2011 after being crushed by a garage door while preparing for a training ride.

The stage began at a rapid pace, meaning that the capability for a breakaway to establish an advantage was limited. Indeed, by Alfarràs, Garmin–Sharp were still in control of the peloton and led out race leader Dan Martin in order for him to extend his overall lead, by claiming the three bonus seconds on offer at the line, with team-mates Koldo Fernández and Ryder Hesjedal following him across. The race remained together right into the second half of the stage and the Alt de Prades. It was there that eight riders attacked on the climb, and were given freedom by the bunch. With two members of the group – Astana's Egor Silin and Daniel Navarro of Cofidis – being within three minutes of Martin, Garmin–Sharp kept the lead group within range at around one-and-a-half minutes. The lead group was brought back with 4 km (2.5 mi) to go, setting up a sprint finish in Valls. Daniele Ratto (Cannondale) was first to launch the sprint, but he was overtaken by Omega Pharma–Quick-Step's Gianni Meersman, however both were beaten by a fast-finishing Simon Gerrans of Orica–GreenEDGE, to take the stage win by a bike length.

Stage 6 Result

	Rider	Team	Time
1	Simon Gerrans (AUS)	Orica–GreenEDGE	3h 55' 46"
2	Gianni Meersman (BEL)	Omega Pharma–Quick-Step	s.t.
3	Samuel Dumoulin (FRA)	Ag2r–La Mondiale	s.t.
4	Daniele Ratto (ITA)	Cannondale	s.t.
5	Danilo Wyss (SUI)	BMC Racing Team	s.t.
6	Julien Simon (FRA)	Sojasun	s.t.
7	Daniel Moreno (ESP)	Team Katusha	s.t.
8	Joaquim Rodríguez (ESP)	Team Katusha	s.t.
9	Jakob Fuglsang (DEN)	Astana	s.t.
10	Rigoberto Urán (COL)	Team Sky	s.t.

General Classification after Stage 6

	Rider	Team	Time
1	Dan Martin (IRL)	Garmin–Sharp	26h 16' 22"
2	Joaquim Rodríguez (ESP)	Team Katusha	+ 17"
3	Nairo Quintana (COL)	Movistar Team	+ 45"
4	Bradley Wiggins (GBR)	Team Sky	+ 54"
5	Michele Scarponi (ITA)	Lampre–Merida	+ 55"
6	Robert Gesink (NED)	Blanco Pro Cycling	+ 1' 07"
7	Przemysław Niemiec (POL)	Lampre–Merida	+ 1' 18"
8	Thibaut Pinot (FRA)	FDJ	+ 1' 26"
9	Jurgen Van den Broeck (BEL)	Lotto–Belisol	+ 1' 28"
10	Peter Stetina (USA)	Garmin–Sharp	+ 1' 30"

=== Stage 7 ===
24 March 2013 — El Vendrell to Barcelona–Montjuïc, 128.9 km (80.1 mi)

The final stage of the race was the Volta's annual foray into Barcelona for the finish. After starting in El Vendrell, the race moved towards the coast at Calafell before the run-in towards Barcelona, which included the third-category Alt de la Maladona ascent. Once the race reached Barcelona, eight laps of a circuit around 6 km (3.7 mi) length were completed, with each lap containing a climb of the Montjuïc hill. The hill had most recently featured in the closing kilometres of the ninth stage of the 2012 Vuelta a España, when Joaquim Rodríguez and Philippe Gilbert attacked at the top of the climb and remained off the front of the race until the end, where Gilbert prevailed in a sprint finish. Much like the previous day, the stage's first hour was completed at a frenetic pace – at nearly 50 km/h (31 mph) – but did not deter a breakaway group forming and this was initiated at the first intermediate sprint point in the city of Vilanova i la Geltrú.

Caja Rural–Seguros RGA's Karol Domagalski led across the line, ahead of Saxo–Tinkoff rider Karsten Kroon and Michał Gołaś of the Omega Pharma–Quick-Step team. They were joined by seven other riders, and extended their advantage over the Team Katusha-led peloton to around three-and-a-half minutes. The breakaway mopped up the bonus seconds at the other intermediate sprint point at Castelldefels, meaning that Rodríguez would have to play his hand nearer Montjuïc, in order to potentially leapfrog Dan Martin (Garmin–Sharp) overall. The breakaway manage to survive off the front of the race until 22 km (13.7 mi) from the end. A counter-attack followed from a group of four riders – David López of Team Sky, Vacansoleil–DCM's Thomas De Gendt, Tim Wellens (Lotto–Belisol) and Kroon's team-mate Chris Anker Sørensen – gaining distance off the front on the climb.

Sørensen was dropped by his three companions not long after, while Movistar Team rider Nairo Quintana tried to attack from the peloton, but was brought back due to his close nature to both Martin and Rodríguez in the general classification. The lead group swelled to five riders several kilometres later, as Michele Scarponi of the Lampre–Merida team – fifth in the general classification overnight – and RadioShack–Leopard's Robert Kišerlovski bridged across a 20-second gap to reach the leaders. Martin's team-mates took station on the front of the peloton, in order to negate any potential gains that Scarponi could have got off the front. Ultimately, Scarponi failed to achieve enough seconds to take the overall victory, but the group of four riders (minus Wellens, who had been dropped) remained clear to the end, where De Gendt beat out López for the stage victory, taking both his – and his team's – first win of 2013. The bunch came across the line 21 seconds later, with Martin positioned in the group to become the first Irish winner of the race in 27 years. Scarponi's advantage enabled him to move up two places into third overall, passing Quintana and Team Sky's Bradley Wiggins.

Stage 7 Result

	Rider	Team	Time
1	Thomas De Gendt (BEL)	Vacansoleil–DCM	2h 45' 42"
2	David López (ESP)	Team Sky	s.t.
3	Robert Kišerlovski (CRO)	RadioShack–Leopard	s.t.
4	Michele Scarponi (ITA)	Lampre–Merida	s.t.
5	Samuel Dumoulin (FRA)	Ag2r–La Mondiale	+ 21"
6	Julien Simon (FRA)	Sojasun	+ 21"
7	Manuele Mori (ITA)	Lampre–Merida	+ 21"
8	Travis Meyer (AUS)	Orica–GreenEDGE	+ 21"
9	Gianluca Brambilla (ITA)	Omega Pharma–Quick-Step	+ 21"
10	Jakob Fuglsang (DEN)	Astana	+ 21"

Final General Classification

	Rider	Team	Time
1	Dan Martin (IRL)	Garmin–Sharp	29h 02' 25"
2	Joaquim Rodríguez (ESP)	Team Katusha	+ 17"
3	Michele Scarponi (ITA)	Lampre–Merida	+ 34"
4	Nairo Quintana (COL)	Movistar Team	+ 45"
5	Bradley Wiggins (GBR)	Team Sky	+ 54"
6	Robert Gesink (NED)	Blanco Pro Cycling	+ 1' 07"
7	Przemysław Niemiec (POL)	Lampre–Merida	+ 1' 18"
8	Thibaut Pinot (FRA)	FDJ	+ 1' 26"
9	Jurgen Van den Broeck (BEL)	Lotto–Belisol	+ 1' 28"
10	Tom Danielson (USA)	Garmin–Sharp	+ 1' 41"

== Classification leadership table ==
In the 2013 Volta a Catalunya, four different jerseys were awarded. For the general classification, calculated by adding each cyclist's finishing times on each stage, and allowing time bonuses in intermediate sprints and at the finish in mass-start stages, the leader received a white and green jersey. This classification was considered the most important of the 2013 Volta a Catalunya, and the winner of the classification was considered the winner of the race.

Additionally, there was a sprints classification, which awarded a white jersey. In the sprints classification, cyclists received points for finishing in the top 3 at intermediate sprint points during each stage; these intermediate sprints also offered bonus seconds towards the general classification. There was also a mountains classification, the leadership of which was marked by a red jersey. In the mountains classification, points were won by reaching the top of a climb before other cyclists, with more points available for the higher-categorised climbs.

The fourth jersey represented the special sprints classification, marked by a yellow jersey. This was in recognition of the 100th edition of the Tour de France to be held later in 2013, and was marked by a single sprint on each of the race's seven stages. There was also a classification for teams, in which the times of the best three cyclists per team on each stage were added together; the leading team at the end of the race was the team with the lowest total time.

Stage	Winner	General Classification	Mountains Classification	Sprint Classification	Special Sprint Classification	Team Classification
1	Gianni Meersman	Gianni Meersman	Cristiano Salerno	Christian Meier	Christian Meier	Team Sky
2	Gianni Meersman	Gianni Meersman	Cristiano Salerno	Christian Meier	Christian Meier	Team Sky
3	Nairo Quintana	Alejandro Valverde	Cristiano Salerno	Christian Meier	Christian Meier	Team Sky
4	Dan Martin	Dan Martin	Cristiano Salerno	Christian Meier	Christian Meier	Garmin–Sharp
5	François Parisien	Dan Martin	Cristiano Salerno	Christian Meier	Christian Meier	Garmin–Sharp
6	Simon Gerrans	Dan Martin	Cristiano Salerno	Christian Meier	Christian Meier	Garmin–Sharp
7	Thomas De Gendt	Dan Martin	Cristiano Salerno	Christian Meier	Christian Meier	Garmin–Sharp
Final		Dan Martin	Cristiano Salerno	Christian Meier	Christian Meier	Garmin–Sharp
