= 2021 Volta a Catalunya =

Cycling race

2021 UCI World Tour, race 7 of 29

Race details
- Dates: 22–28 March 2021
- Stages: 7
- Distance: 1,094.4 km (680.0 mi)
- Winning time: 26h 16' 41"

Results
Jersey awarded to the overall winner	Winner	Adam Yates (GBR)	(Ineos Grenadiers)
	Second	Richie Porte (AUS)	(Ineos Grenadiers)
	Third	Geraint Thomas (GBR)	(Ineos Grenadiers)
Jersey awarded to the points classification winner	Points	Esteban Chaves (COL)	(Team BikeExchange)
Jersey awarded to the mountains classification winner	Mountains	Esteban Chaves (COL)	(Team BikeExchange)
Jersey awarded to the youth classification winner	Youth	João Almeida (POR)	(Deceuninck–Quick-Step)
Jersey awarded to the team classification winner	Team	Ineos Grenadiers	

The 2021 Volta a Catalunya was a road cycling stage race that took place between 22 and 28 March 2021 in Spain. It was the 100th edition of the Volta a Catalunya and the seventh race of the 2021 UCI World Tour.

== Teams ==
All nineteen UCI WorldTeams were joined by five UCI ProTeams to make up the twenty-four teams that participated in the race. Each team entered seven riders for a total of 168 riders, of which 131 finished. Alpecin–Fenix was initially scheduled to participate, but they withdrew before the start of the race after three staff members tested positive for COVID-19. Equipo Kern Pharma withdrew before the start of stage 5 after two staff members tested positive for COVID-19.

UCI WorldTeams

- AG2R Citroën Team
- Astana–Premier Tech
- Bora–Hansgrohe
- Cofidis
- Deceuninck–Quick-Step
- EF Education–Nippo
- Groupama–FDJ
- Ineos Grenadiers
- Intermarché–Wanty–Gobert Matériaux
- Israel Start-Up Nation
- Lotto–Soudal
- Movistar Team
- Team Bahrain Victorious
- Team BikeExchange
- Team DSM
- Team Jumbo–Visma
- Team Qhubeka Assos
- Trek–Segafredo
- UAE Team Emirates

UCI ProTeams

- ~~Alpecin–Fenix~~
- Arkéa–Samsic
- Equipo Kern Pharma
- Euskaltel–Euskadi
- Gazprom–RusVelo
- Rally Cycling

== Route ==
Stage characteristics and winners
Stage	Date	Route	Distance	Type	Winner
1	22 March	Calella to Calella	178.4 km (110.9 mi)	Medium mountain stage	Andreas Kron (DEN)
2	23 March	Pla de l'Estany (Banyoles) to Pla de l'Estany (Banyoles)	18.5 km (11.5 mi)	Individual time trial	Rohan Dennis (AUS)
3	24 March	Canal Olímpic de Catalunya to Vallter 2000	203.1 km (126.2 mi)	Mountain stage	Adam Yates (GBR)
4	25 March	Ripoll to Port Ainé (Pallars Sobirà)	166.5 km (103.5 mi)	Mountain stage	Esteban Chaves (COL)
5	26 March	La Pobla de Segur to Manresa	201.1 km (125.0 mi)	Medium mountain stage	Lennard Kämna (GER)
6	27 March	Tarragona to Mataró	193.8 km (120.4 mi)	Hilly stage	Peter Sagan (SVK)
7	28 March	Barcelona to Barcelona	133 km (83 mi)	Medium mountain stage	Thomas De Gendt (BEL)
Total			1,094.4 km (680.0 mi)		

== Stages ==
=== Stage 1 ===
22 March 2021 — Calella to Calella, 178.4 km (110.9 mi)

Stage 1 Result
Rank	Rider	Team	Time
1	Andreas Kron (DEN)	Lotto–Soudal	4h 20' 15"
2	Luis León Sánchez (ESP)	Astana–Premier Tech	+ 0"
3	Rémy Rochas (FRA)	Cofidis	+ 0"
4	Lennard Kämna (GER)	Bora–Hansgrohe	+ 0"
5	Dion Smith (NZL)	Team BikeExchange	+ 16"
6	Matej Mohorič (SLO)	Team Bahrain Victorious	+ 16"
7	Ide Schelling (NED)	Bora–Hansgrohe	+ 16"
8	Alejandro Valverde (ESP)	Movistar Team	+ 16"
9	Alexander Kamp (DEN)	Trek–Segafredo	+ 16"
10	Michael Valgren (DEN)	EF Education–Nippo	+ 16"

General classification after Stage 1
Rank	Rider	Team	Time
1	Andreas Kron (DEN)	Lotto–Soudal	4h 20' 05"
2	Luis León Sánchez (ESP)	Astana–Premier Tech	+ 4"
3	Rémy Rochas (FRA)	Cofidis	+ 6"
4	Lennard Kämna (GER)	Bora–Hansgrohe	+ 10"
5	Dion Smith (NZL)	Team BikeExchange	+ 26"
6	Matej Mohorič (SLO)	Team Bahrain Victorious	+ 26"
7	Ide Schelling (NED)	Bora–Hansgrohe	+ 26"
8	Alejandro Valverde (ESP)	Movistar Team	+ 26"
9	Alexander Kamp (DEN)	Trek–Segafredo	+ 26"
10	Michael Valgren (DEN)	EF Education–Nippo	+ 26"

=== Stage 2 ===
23 March 2021 — Pla de l'Estany (Banyoles) to Pla de l'Estany (Banyoles), 18.5 km (11.5 mi) (ITT)

Stage 2 Result
Rank	Rider	Team	Time
1	Rohan Dennis (AUS)	Ineos Grenadiers	22' 27"
2	Rémi Cavagna (FRA)	Deceuninck–Quick-Step	+ 5"
3	João Almeida (POR)	Deceuninck–Quick-Step	+ 28"
4	Brandon McNulty (USA)	UAE Team Emirates	+ 28"
5	Steven Kruijswijk (NED)	Team Jumbo–Visma	+ 33"
6	Richie Porte (AUS)	Ineos Grenadiers	+ 34"
7	Adam Yates (GBR)	Ineos Grenadiers	+ 35"
8	Josef Černý (CZE)	Deceuninck–Quick-Step	+ 38"
9	Stefan de Bod (RSA)	Astana–Premier Tech	+ 38"
10	Geraint Thomas (GBR)	Ineos Grenadiers	+ 47"

General classification after Stage 2
Rank	Rider	Team	Time
1	João Almeida (POR)	Deceuninck–Quick-Step	4h 43' 26"
2	Brandon McNulty (USA)	UAE Team Emirates	+ 0"
3	Luis León Sánchez (ESP)	Astana–Premier Tech	+ 3"
4	Steven Kruijswijk (NED)	Team Jumbo–Visma	+ 5"
5	Richie Porte (AUS)	Ineos Grenadiers	+ 6"
6	Adam Yates (GBR)	Ineos Grenadiers	+ 7"
7	Stefan de Bod (RSA)	Astana–Premier Tech	+ 10"
8	Geraint Thomas (GBR)	Ineos Grenadiers	+ 19"
9	Fausto Masnada (ITA)	Deceuninck–Quick-Step	+ 20"
10	Lennard Kämna (GER)	Bora–Hansgrohe	+ 21"

=== Stage 3 ===
24 March 2021 — Canal Olímpic de Catalunya to Vallter 2000, 203.1 km (126.2 mi)

Stage 3 Result
Rank	Rider	Team	Time
1	Adam Yates (GBR)	Ineos Grenadiers	5h 00' 58"
2	Esteban Chaves (COL)	Team BikeExchange	+ 13"
3	Alejandro Valverde (ESP)	Movistar Team	+ 19"
4	Geraint Thomas (GBR)	Ineos Grenadiers	+ 31"
5	Harm Vanhoucke (BEL)	Lotto–Soudal	+ 31"
6	Sepp Kuss (USA)	Team Jumbo–Visma	+ 33"
7	Hugh Carthy (GBR)	EF Education–Nippo	+ 33"
8	Michael Woods (CAN)	Israel Start-Up Nation	+ 36"
9	Richie Porte (AUS)	Ineos Grenadiers	+ 36"
10	Giulio Ciccone (ITA)	Trek–Segafredo	+ 36"

General classification after Stage 3
Rank	Rider	Team	Time
1	Adam Yates (GBR)	Ineos Grenadiers	9h 44' 21"
2	Richie Porte (AUS)	Ineos Grenadiers	+ 45"
3	João Almeida (POR)	Deceuninck–Quick-Step	+ 49"
4	Geraint Thomas (GBR)	Ineos Grenadiers	+ 53"
5	Wilco Kelderman (NED)	Bora–Hansgrohe	+ 1' 03"
6	Alejandro Valverde (ESP)	Movistar Team	+ 1' 04"
7	Hugh Carthy (GBR)	EF Education–Nippo	+ 1' 14"
8	Simon Yates (GBR)	Team BikeExchange	+ 1' 21"
9	Esteban Chaves (COL)	Team BikeExchange	+ 1' 21"
10	Brandon McNulty (USA)	UAE Team Emirates	+ 1' 24"

=== Stage 4 ===
25 March 2021 — Ripoll to Port Ainé (Pallars Sobirà), 166.5 km (103.5 mi)

Stage 4 Result
Rank	Rider	Team	Time
1	Esteban Chaves (COL)	Team BikeExchange	4h 29' 47"
2	Michael Woods (CAN)	Israel Start-Up Nation	+ 7"
3	Geraint Thomas (GBR)	Ineos Grenadiers	+ 7"
4	Adam Yates (GBR)	Ineos Grenadiers	+ 7"
5	Sepp Kuss (USA)	Team Jumbo–Visma	+ 7"
6	Alejandro Valverde (ESP)	Movistar Team	+ 7"
7	Richie Porte (AUS)	Ineos Grenadiers	+ 7"
8	Wilco Kelderman (NED)	Bora–Hansgrohe	+ 7"
9	Nairo Quintana (COL)	Arkéa–Samsic	+ 7"
10	Lucas Hamilton (AUS)	Team BikeExchange	+ 7"

General classification after Stage 4
Rank	Rider	Team	Time
1	Adam Yates (GBR)	Ineos Grenadiers	14h 14' 15"
2	Richie Porte (AUS)	Ineos Grenadiers	+ 45"
3	Geraint Thomas (GBR)	Ineos Grenadiers	+ 49"
4	Alejandro Valverde (ESP)	Movistar Team	+ 1' 03"
5	Wilco Kelderman (NED)	Bora–Hansgrohe	+ 1' 03"
6	Esteban Chaves (COL)	Team BikeExchange	+ 1' 04"
7	João Almeida (POR)	Deceuninck–Quick-Step	+ 1' 07"
8	Hugh Carthy (GBR)	EF Education–Nippo	+ 1' 20"
9	Sepp Kuss (USA)	Team Jumbo–Visma	+ 1' 29"
10	Simon Yates (GBR)	Team BikeExchange	+ 1' 32"

=== Stage 5 ===
26 March 2021 — La Pobla de Segur to Manresa, 201.1 km (125.0 mi)

Stage 5 Result
Rank	Rider	Team	Time
1	Lennard Kämna (GER)	Bora–Hansgrohe	4h 29' 13"
2	Ruben Guerreiro (POR)	EF Education–Nippo	+ 39"
3	Mikel Bizkarra (ESP)	Euskaltel–Euskadi	+ 42"
4	Dion Smith (NZL)	Team BikeExchange	+ 44"
5	Dan Martin (IRL)	Israel Start-Up Nation	+ 44"
6	Matej Mohorič (SLO)	Team Bahrain Victorious	+ 44"
7	James Knox (GBR)	Deceuninck–Quick-Step	+ 44"
8	Attila Valter (HUN)	Groupama–FDJ	+ 44"
9	Rigoberto Urán (COL)	EF Education–Nippo	+ 44"
10	Steven Kruijswijk (NED)	Team Jumbo–Visma	+ 44"

General classification after Stage 5
Rank	Rider	Team	Time
1	Adam Yates (GBR)	Ineos Grenadiers	18h 45' 27"
2	Richie Porte (AUS)	Ineos Grenadiers	+ 45"
3	Geraint Thomas (GBR)	Ineos Grenadiers	+ 49"
4	Alejandro Valverde (ESP)	Movistar Team	+ 1' 03"
5	Wilco Kelderman (NED)	Bora–Hansgrohe	+ 1' 03"
6	Esteban Chaves (COL)	Team BikeExchange	+ 1' 04"
7	João Almeida (POR)	Deceuninck–Quick-Step	+ 1' 07"
8	Hugh Carthy (GBR)	EF Education–Nippo	+ 1' 20"
9	Sepp Kuss (USA)	Team Jumbo–Visma	+ 1' 29"
10	Simon Yates (GBR)	Team BikeExchange	+ 1' 32"

=== Stage 6 ===
27 March 2021 — Tarragona to Mataró, 193.8 km (120.4 mi)

Stage 6 Result
Rank	Rider	Team	Time
1	Peter Sagan (SVK)	Bora–Hansgrohe	4h 23' 18"
2	Daryl Impey (RSA)	Israel Start-Up Nation	+ 0"
3	Juan Sebastián Molano (COL)	UAE Team Emirates	+ 0"
4	Reinardt Janse van Rensburg (RSA)	Team Qhubeka Assos	+ 0"
5	Alexander Kamp (DEN)	Trek–Segafredo	+ 0"
6	Clément Venturini (FRA)	AG2R Citroën Team	+ 0"
7	Max Kanter (GER)	Team DSM	+ 0"
8	João Almeida (POR)	Deceuninck–Quick-Step	+ 0"
9	Michael Valgren (DEN)	EF Education–Nippo	+ 0"
10	Maxim Van Gils (BEL)	Lotto–Soudal	+ 0"

General classification after Stage 6
Rank	Rider	Team	Time
1	Adam Yates (GBR)	Ineos Grenadiers	23h 08' 45"
2	Richie Porte (AUS)	Ineos Grenadiers	+ 45"
3	Geraint Thomas (GBR)	Ineos Grenadiers	+ 49"
4	Alejandro Valverde (ESP)	Movistar Team	+ 1' 03"
5	Wilco Kelderman (NED)	Bora–Hansgrohe	+ 1' 03"
6	Esteban Chaves (COL)	Team BikeExchange	+ 1' 04"
7	João Almeida (POR)	Deceuninck–Quick-Step	+ 1' 07"
8	Hugh Carthy (GBR)	EF Education–Nippo	+ 1' 20"
9	Sepp Kuss (USA)	Team Jumbo–Visma	+ 1' 29"
10	Simon Yates (GBR)	Team BikeExchange	+ 1' 32"

=== Stage 7 ===
28 March 2021 — Barcelona to Barcelona, 133 km (83 mi)

Stage 7 Result
Rank	Rider	Team	Time
1	Thomas De Gendt (BEL)	Lotto–Soudal	3h 06' 10"
2	Matej Mohorič (SLO)	Team Bahrain Victorious	+ 22"
3	Attila Valter (HUN)	Groupama–FDJ	+ 1' 42"
4	Sébastien Reichenbach (SUI)	Groupama–FDJ	+ 1' 46"
5	Alejandro Valverde (ESP)	Movistar Team	+ 1' 46"
6	Michael Woods (CAN)	Israel Start-Up Nation	+ 1' 46"
7	Marc Hirschi (SUI)	UAE Team Emirates	+ 1' 46"
8	João Almeida (POR)	Deceuninck–Quick-Step	+ 1' 46"
9	Adam Yates (GBR)	Ineos Grenadiers	+ 1' 46"
10	Clément Champoussin (FRA)	AG2R Citroën Team	+ 1' 46"

General classification after Stage 7
Rank	Rider	Team	Time
1	Adam Yates (GBR)	Ineos Grenadiers	26h 16' 41"
2	Richie Porte (AUS)	Ineos Grenadiers	+ 45"
3	Geraint Thomas (GBR)	Ineos Grenadiers	+ 49"
4	Alejandro Valverde (ESP)	Movistar Team	+ 1' 03"
5	Wilco Kelderman (NED)	Bora–Hansgrohe	+ 1' 03"
6	Esteban Chaves (COL)	Team BikeExchange	+ 1' 04"
7	João Almeida (POR)	Deceuninck–Quick-Step	+ 1' 05"
8	Hugh Carthy (GBR)	EF Education–Nippo	+ 1' 20"
9	Simon Yates (GBR)	Team BikeExchange	+ 1' 32"
10	Lucas Hamilton (AUS)	Team BikeExchange	+ 1' 35"

== Classification leadership table ==
Classification leadership by stage
Stage	Winner	General classification	Points classification	Mountains classification	Young rider classification	Team classification	Combativity award
1	Andreas Kron	Andreas Kron	Andreas Kron	Sylvain Moniquet	Andreas Kron	Astana–Premier Tech	Sylvain Moniquet
2	Rohan Dennis	João Almeida	Andreas Kron	Sylvain Moniquet	João Almeida	Ineos Grenadiers	Not awarded
3	Adam Yates	Adam Yates	Adam Yates	Adam Yates	João Almeida	Ineos Grenadiers	Kiko Galván
4	Esteban Chaves	Adam Yates	Esteban Chaves	Esteban Chaves	João Almeida	Ineos Grenadiers	Lennard Kämna
5	Lennard Kämna	Adam Yates	Esteban Chaves	Esteban Chaves	João Almeida	Ineos Grenadiers	Rémi Cavagna
6	Peter Sagan	Adam Yates	Esteban Chaves	Esteban Chaves	João Almeida	Ineos Grenadiers	Matej Mohorič
7	Thomas De Gendt	Adam Yates	Esteban Chaves	Esteban Chaves	João Almeida	Ineos Grenadiers	Thomas De Gendt
Final		Adam Yates	Esteban Chaves	Esteban Chaves	João Almeida	Ineos Grenadiers	Not awarded

- On stage 2, Natnael Berhane, who was second in the sprints classification, wore the blue-striped jersey, because first-placed Andreas Kron wore the green-striped jersey as the leader of the general classification. For the same reason, Rémy Rochas, who was second in the young rider classification, wore the orange-striped jersey.
- On stage 3, Brandon McNulty, who was second in the young rider classification, wore the orange-striped jersey, because first-placed João Almeida wore the green-striped jersey as the leader of the general classification.
- On stage 4, Rohan Dennis, who was second in the sprints classification, wore the blue-striped jersey, because first-placed Adam Yates wore the green-striped jersey as the leader of the general classification. For the same reason, Esteban Chaves, who was second in the mountains classification, wore the red-striped jersey.
- On stages 5–7, Koen Bouwman, who was third in the mountains classification, wore the red-striped jersey, because first-placed Esteban Chaves wore the blue-striped jersey as the leader of the points classification, and second-placed Adam Yates wore the green-striped jersey as the leader of the general classification.

== Final classification standings ==
Legend
Denotes the winner of the general classification	Denotes the winner of the young rider classification
Denotes the winner of the points classification	Denotes the winner of the team classification
Denotes the winner of the mountains classification	Denotes the winner of the combativity award

=== General classification ===
Final general classification (1–10)
Rank	Rider	Team	Time
1	Adam Yates (GBR)	Ineos Grenadiers	26h 16' 41"
2	Richie Porte (AUS)	Ineos Grenadiers	+ 45"
3	Geraint Thomas (GBR)	Ineos Grenadiers	+ 49"
4	Alejandro Valverde (ESP)	Movistar Team	+ 1' 03"
5	Wilco Kelderman (NED)	Bora–Hansgrohe	+ 1' 03"
6	Esteban Chaves (COL)	Team BikeExchange	+ 1' 04"
7	João Almeida (POR)	Deceuninck–Quick-Step	+ 1' 05"
8	Hugh Carthy (GBR)	EF Education–Nippo	+ 1' 20"
9	Simon Yates (GBR)	Team BikeExchange	+ 1' 32"
10	Lucas Hamilton (AUS)	Team BikeExchange	+ 1' 35"

=== Points classification ===
Final points classification (1–10)
Rank	Rider	Team	Points
1	Esteban Chaves (COL)	Team BikeExchange	16
2	Thomas De Gendt (BEL)	Lotto–Soudal	13
3	Peter Sagan (SVK)	Bora–Hansgrohe	13
4	Rohan Dennis (AUS)	Ineos Grenadiers	11
5	Adam Yates (GBR)	Ineos Grenadiers	10
6	Lennard Kämna (GER)	Bora–Hansgrohe	10
7	Rémi Cavagna (FRA)	Deceuninck–Quick-Step	9
8	Natnael Berhane (ERI)	Cofidis	6
9	João Almeida (POR)	Deceuninck–Quick-Step	6
10	Michael Woods (CAN)	Israel Start-Up Nation	6

=== Mountains classification ===
Final mountains classification (1–10)
Rank	Rider	Team	Points
1	Esteban Chaves (COL)	Team BikeExchange	50
2	Adam Yates (GBR)	Ineos Grenadiers	40
3	Thomas De Gendt (BEL)	Lotto–Soudal	38
4	Koen Bouwman (NED)	Team Jumbo–Visma	35
5	Geraint Thomas (GBR)	Ineos Grenadiers	30
6	Alejandro Valverde (ESP)	Movistar Team	28
7	Lennard Kämna (GER)	Bora–Hansgrohe	27
8	Michael Woods (CAN)	Israel Start-Up Nation	26
9	Sepp Kuss (USA)	Team Jumbo–Visma	23
10	Matej Mohorič (SLO)	Team Bahrain Victorious	21

=== Young rider classification ===
Final young rider classification (1–10)
Rank	Rider	Team	Time
1	João Almeida (POR)	Deceuninck–Quick-Step	26h 17' 46"
2	Lucas Hamilton (AUS)	Team BikeExchange	+ 30"
3	Brandon McNulty (USA)	UAE Team Emirates	+ 1' 14"
4	Harm Vanhoucke (BEL)	Lotto–Soudal	+ 4' 09"
5	Santiago Buitrago (COL)	Team Bahrain Victorious	+ 4' 52"
6	Lennard Kämna (GER)	Bora–Hansgrohe	+ 17' 40"
7	Ben Zwiehoff (GER)	Bora–Hansgrohe	+ 25' 22"
8	Attila Valter (HUN)	Groupama–FDJ	+ 26' 41"
9	Callum Scotson (AUS)	Team BikeExchange	+ 28' 08"
10	Clément Champoussin (FRA)	AG2R Citroën Team	+ 31' 00"

=== Team classification ===
Final team classification (1–10)
Rank	Team	Time
1	Ineos Grenadiers	78h 51' 04"
2	Team BikeExchange	+ 36"
3	Movistar Team	+ 14' 11"
4	Team Jumbo–Visma	+ 26' 10"
5	EF Education–Nippo	+ 26' 48"
6	Deceuninck–Quick-Step	+ 27' 21"
7	UAE Team Emirates	+ 31' 42"
8	Bora–Hansgrohe	+ 35' 41"
9	Euskaltel–Euskadi	+ 41' 26"
10	Trek–Segafredo	+ 42' 47"
