= Thomas De Gendt =

Belgian road racing cyclist (born 1986)

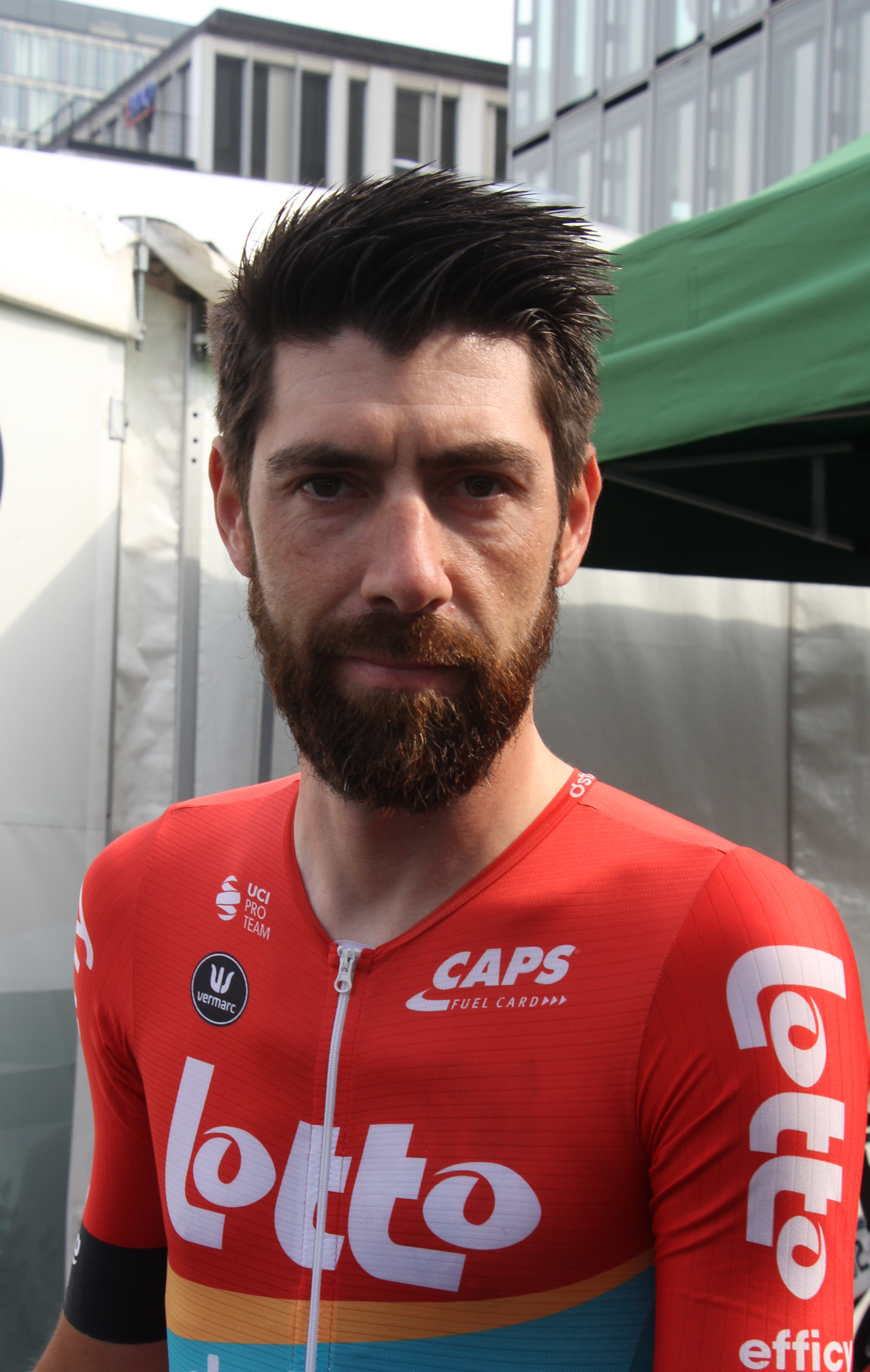
- De Gendt in 2023

Personal information
- Full name: Thomas De Gendt
- Born: 6 November 1986 (age 40) Sint-Niklaas, Flanders, Belgium
- Height: 1.79 m (5 ft 10 1/2 in)
- Weight: 73 kg (161 lb; 11 st 7 lb)

Cycling career
- Sport: Cycling
- Discipline: Road
- Role: Rider
- Rider type: Breakaway specialist

Amateur team
- 2006–2008: Unibet–Davo

Professional teams
- 2009–2010: Topsport Vlaanderen–Mercator
- 2011–2013: Vacansoleil–DCM
- 2014: Omega Pharma–Quick-Step
- 2015–2024: Lotto–Soudal

Major wins
- Grand Tours Tour de France 2 individual stages (2016, 2019) Giro d'Italia 2 individual stages (2012, 2022) Vuelta a España Mountains classification (2018) 1 individual stage (2017)

Thomas De Gendt (born 6 November 1986) is a Belgian former road racing cyclist, who competed as a professional from 2009 to 2024.

Having competed for Topsport Vlaanderen–Mercator, Vacansoleil–DCM, Omega Pharma–Quick-Step and Lotto–Dstny during his career, De Gendt has taken seventeen professional victories including five Grand Tour stage victories – with at least one at each of the three Grand Tours – and five stage wins at the Volta a Catalunya between 2013 and 2021. The winner of the mountains classification at the 2018 Vuelta a España, De Gendt has also finished on the podium at the 2012 Giro d'Italia, where he was third overall.

== Career ==
=== Topsport Vlaanderen–Mercator (2009–2010) ===
In his first season at UCI Professional Continental level with Topsport Vlaanderen–Mercator in 2009, Sint-Niklaas-born De Gendt won the Internationale Wielertrofee Jong Maar Moedig one-day race, a stage of the Tour de Wallonie, and the mountains and sprints classifications at the Tour of Britain. The following year, De Gendt finished second at Brabantse Pijl, and recorded top-five overall finishes at Étoile de Bessèges (fourth), the Tour of Belgium (fifth) and the Ster Elektrotoer (third).

=== Vacansoleil–DCM (2011–2013) ===
After two seasons with Topsport Vlaanderen–Mercator, De Gendt joined Vacansoleil–DCM for the 2011 season. De Gendt won the opening stage of Paris–Nice and also won stage 7 of the Tour de Suisse. At the Tour de France, despite suffering a minor collarbone fracture, De Gendt had a strong final week, finishing sixth on stage 19 to Alpe d'Huez and fourth in the time trial the following day. He took one other victory during the season – a stage at the Circuit de Lorraine – as he extended his contract with the team, until the end of 2013.

In 2012, De Gendt won stage 7 of Paris–Nice after a 60-kilometre (37-mile) solo attack, having been in a breakaway with Rein Taaramäe; he won the stage by over six minutes ahead of Taaramäe. In the Giro d'Italia, he won the penultimate stage at the Stelvio Pass with a solo breakaway which brought him to fourth in the general classification. The following day he advanced to finish third in the final classification to take his first grand tour podium after passing Michele Scarponi in the final individual time trial. He took one further victory for the team, in 2013, winning the final stage of the Volta a Catalunya.

=== Omega Pharma–Quick-Step (2014) ===
In October 2013, Omega Pharma–Quick-Step announced that they were signing De Gendt for the 2014 season after the Vacansoleil–DCM outfit folded. However, De Gendt left the team after just one season.

=== Lotto–Soudal (2015–present) ===
==== 2015–2019 ====
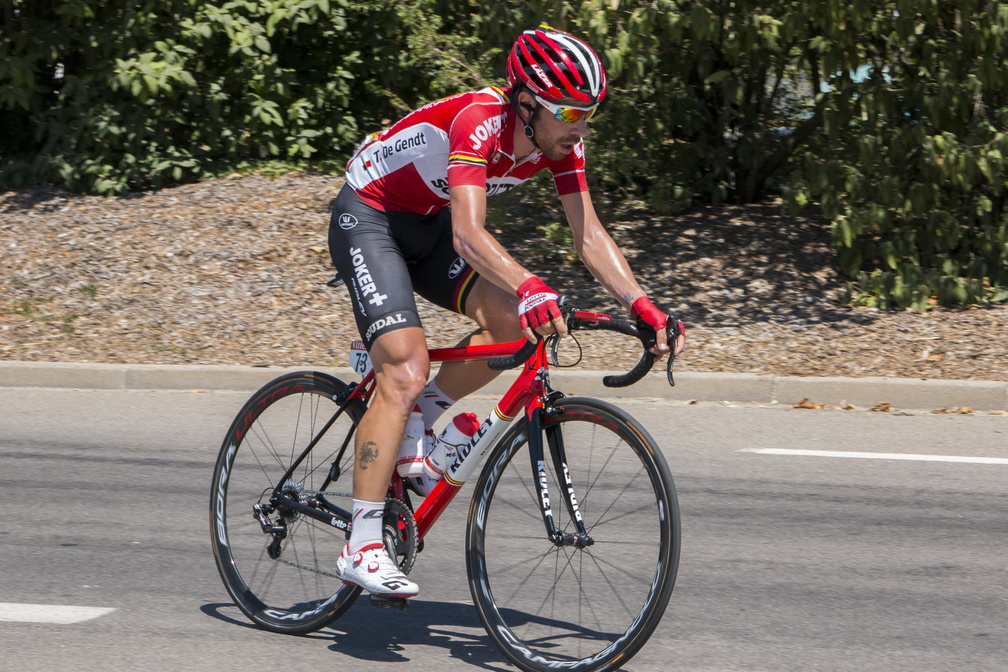
De Gendt at the 2015 Tour de France

After an uneventful season with Omega Pharma–Quick-Step, De Gendt moved to Lotto–Soudal in 2015 on an initial two-year contract. In his first season with the team, De Gendt won the mountains classification at Paris–Nice, and following Stefan Denifl's results being expunged in 2019, was retroactively designated the winner of the mountains classification at the Tour de Suisse.

At the 2016 Volta a Catalunya, De Gendt led the sprints classification from start to finish, and he also won the mountains classification, having assumed the lead after his stage victory on stage four, the queen stage of the race. At the Tour de France, De Gendt held a jersey for the first time at a Grand Tour, taking the polka dot jersey as mountains classification leader following stage five – where he had finished second to Greg Van Avermaet. He held the jersey for three stages initially, and then regained the lead for a further three days following stage twelve, after winning on Mont Ventoux. He ultimately finished second to Rafał Majka in the mountains classification standings.

In his first start of the 2017 season, De Gendt won the mountains classification at the Tour Down Under, taking the jersey from Richie Porte on the final day of the race. He won the opening stage of the Critérium du Dauphiné, over a hilly route in and around Saint-Étienne; he soloed clear of his breakaway companions and won the stage by approximately 45 seconds. He held the race lead through until stage six, when he lost more than eight minutes to the stage winner, Jakob Fuglsang. At the Vuelta a España, De Gendt won stage 19 from a breakaway, completing his set of stage wins in all three Grand Tours.

In 2018, De Gendt won the mountains classification at Paris–Nice, having taken the lead on the penultimate stage of the race. In his next start, he won the third stage of the Volta a Catalunya after a solo attack of around 50 kilometres (31 miles); he took the race lead by 23 seconds following the stage, but he would cede the lead the following day, losing 24 minutes. He added to his string of long breakaway victories by winning the second stage of the Tour de Romandie in solo fashion. He would ultimately go on to win both the points and mountains jerseys at the race. He finished second in the Belgian National Time Trial Championships in June, losing out to teammate Victor Campenaerts by a margin of three seconds. At the Vuelta a España, De Gendt won the mountains classification, having taken the lead on stage 17 from Luis Ángel Maté, who had held the lead of the classification from the start of the race.

Just as he did in 2018, De Gendt won the mountains classification at the 2019 Paris–Nice, his third such victory in five years, having taken the jersey on stage four when he finished second to Magnus Cort on the stage. He then won the opening stage of the Volta a Catalunya, winning the stage by almost three minutes after a solo move of some 60 kilometres (37 miles), attacking from a six-man breakaway group. He held onto the overall race lead until stage four, but was able to hold onto the mountains classification lead throughout the race. At the Tour de France, De Gendt took his second career stage win, winning the eighth stage of the race from the breakaway; he attacked on the final categorised climb – the Côte de la Jaillère – dropping Alessandro De Marchi, and he then held off Thibaut Pinot and Julian Alaphilippe to win the stage by six seconds.

==== 2020 onwards ====
After a winless 2020 – impacted due to the COVID-19 pandemic – De Gendt took his fifth Volta a Catalunya stage victory on the final stage of the 2021 edition, spending more than 100 kilometres (62 miles) in the breakaway, before attacking with approximately 5 kilometres (3.1 miles) remaining.

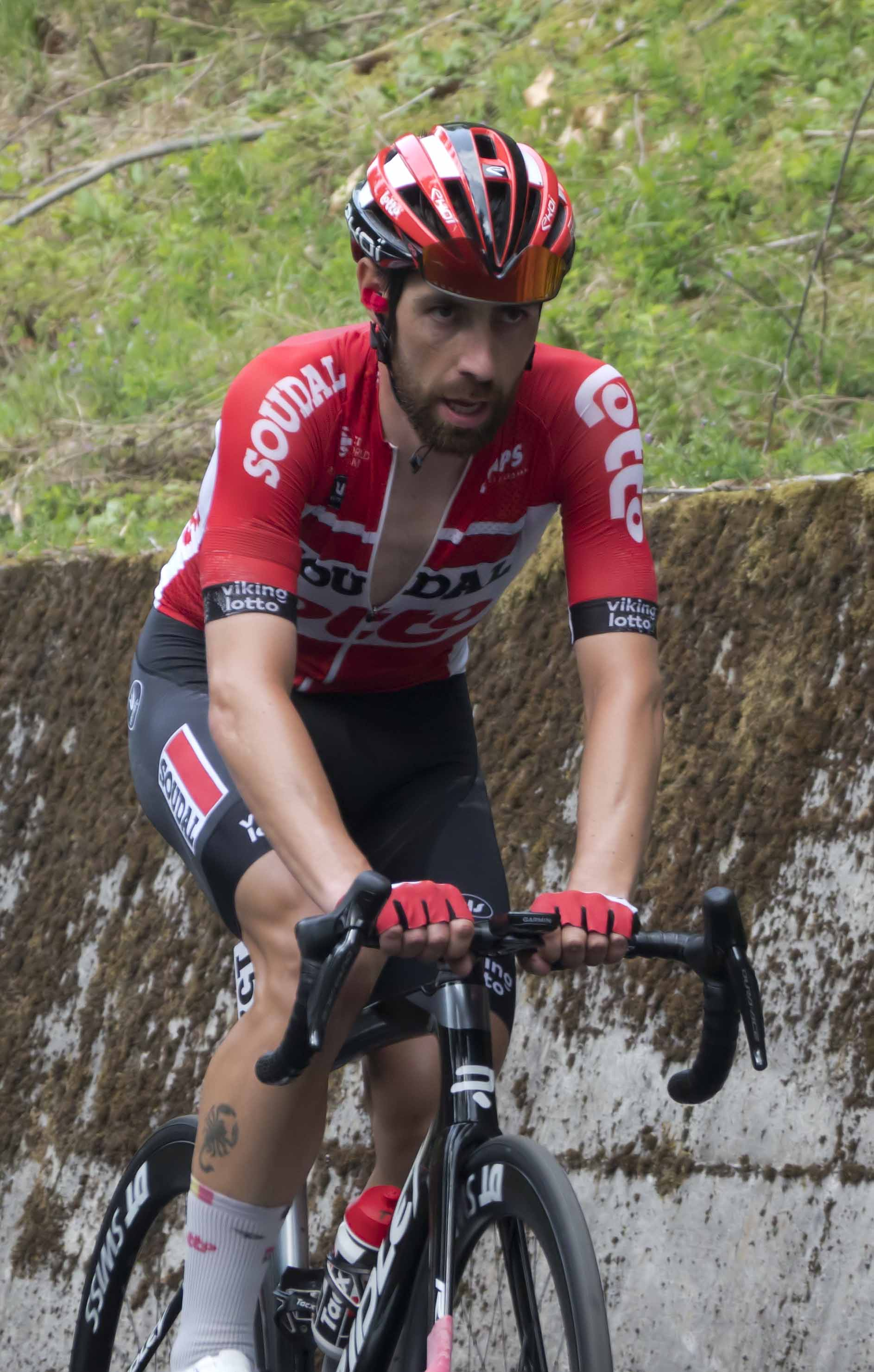
De Gendt at the 2022 Giro d'Italia, where he won Stage 8

At the 2022 Giro d'Italia, De Gendt took his first stage victory at the race for a decade, winning a hilly stage in and around Naples; he was part of a four-rider move that broke away from a larger breakaway group with approximately 40 kilometres (25 miles) remaining, and was assisted by his teammate Harm Vanhoucke in the final sprint to the line. That July, De Gendt signed a two-year contract extension with Lotto–Soudal, until the end of the 2024 season.

== Personal life ==
De Gendt is married with two children.

== Major results ==
2006
1st Mountains classification, Thüringen Rundfahrt der U23
9th Grand Prix de Waregem
2007
1st Stage 3 Thüringen Rundfahrt der U23
2008
1st Overall Le Triptyque des Monts et Châteaux

1st Stage 1

1st Grand Prix de Waregem
3rd Circuit de Wallonie
5th Overall Vuelta a Navarra

1st Stage 4

2009 (1 pro win)
1st Internationale Wielertrofee Jong Maar Moedig
Tour of Britain

1st Mountains classification
1st Sprints classification

4th GP Triberg-Schwarzwald
10th Overall Tour de Wallonie

1st Stage 4

10th Overall Bayern Rundfahrt
2010
1st Sprints classification, Volta ao Algarve
2nd Brabantse Pijl
3rd Overall Ster Elektrotoer
4th Overall Étoile de Bessèges
5th Overall Tour of Belgium
2011 (3)
1st Stage 1 Paris–Nice
1st Stage 7 Tour de Suisse
2nd Overall Circuit de Lorraine

1st Stage 3

9th Overall Volta ao Algarve
9th Chrono des Nations
2012 (2)
1st Stage 7 Paris–Nice
3rd Overall Giro d'Italia

1st Stage 20

3rd Amstel Curaçao Race
2013 (1)
1st Stage 7 Volta a Catalunya
2015
1st Mountains classification, Paris–Nice
1st Mountains classification, Tour de Suisse (Note: In June 2019, Stefan Denifl was stripped of all his race results recorded from the 2014 Bayern Rundfahrt onwards, following his suspension from cycling for blood doping. As a consequence, De Gendt was retroactively promoted one position in the standings.)
Combativity award Stage 13 Tour de France
2016 (2)
Tour de France

1st Stage 12
Held after Stages 5–7, 12–14
Combativity award Stages 5 & 12

Volta a Catalunya

1st Mountains classification
1st Sprints classification
1st Stage 4

Vuelta a España

Held after Stage 9
Combativity award Stage 4

2017 (2)
Vuelta a España

1st Stage 19
Combativity award Stage 13

1st Stage 1 Critérium du Dauphiné
1st Mountains classification, Tour Down Under
4th Time trial, National Road Championships
Combativity award Stage 14 Tour de France
2018 (2)
Vuelta a España

1st Mountains classification
Combativity award Stage 12

Tour de Romandie

1st Points classification
1st Mountains classification
1st Stage 2

1st Stage 3 Volta a Catalunya
1st Mountains classification, Paris–Nice
2nd Time trial, National Road Championships
2019 (2)
Tour de France

1st Stage 8
Combativity award Stage 8

Volta a Catalunya

1st Mountains classification
1st Stage 1

1st Mountains classification, Paris–Nice
2020
4th Time trial, National Road Championships
2021 (1)
1st Stage 7 Volta a Catalunya
2022 (1)
Giro d'Italia

1st Stage 8
Combativity award Stage 8

=== Grand Tour general classification results timeline ===
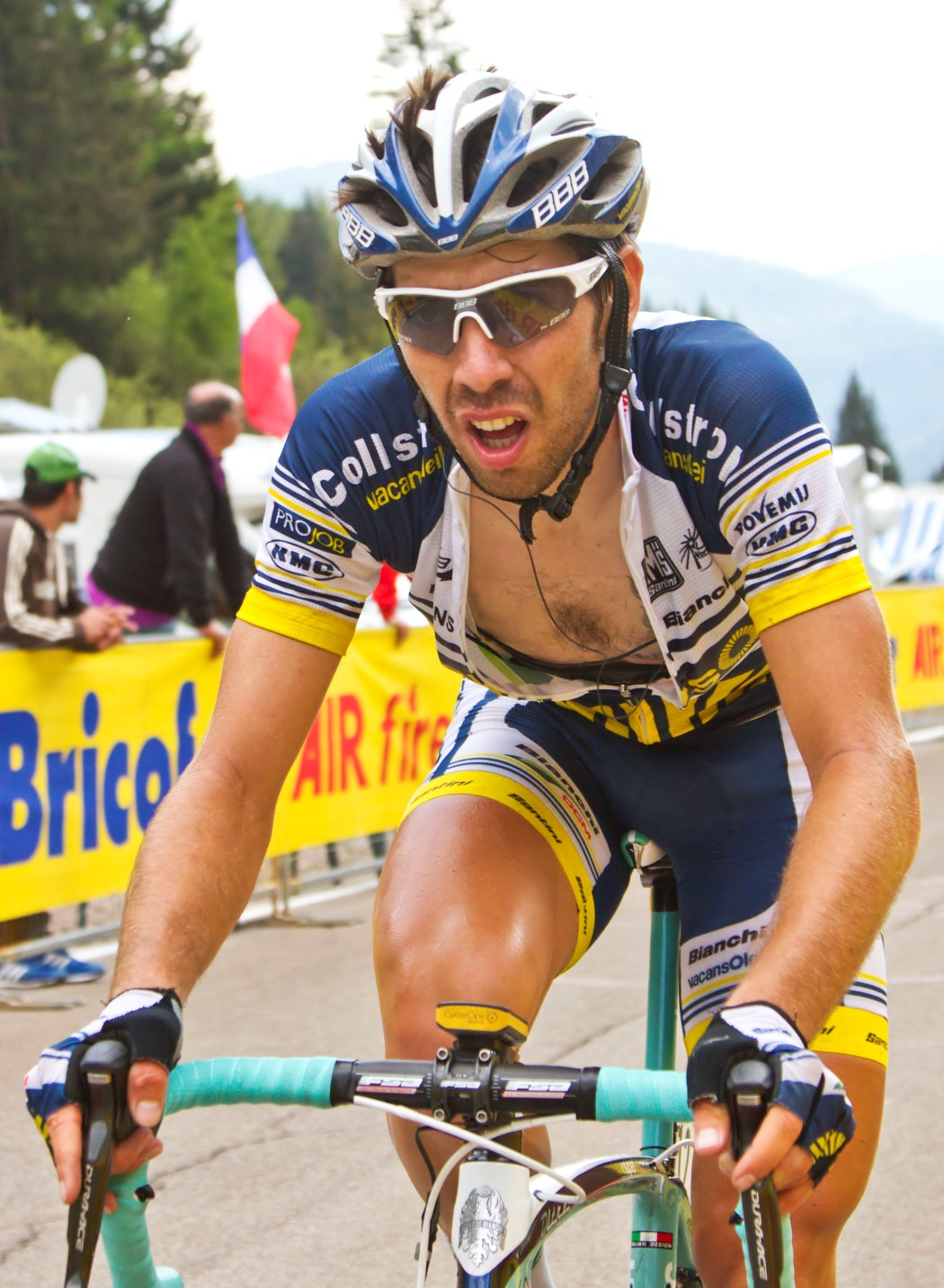
De Gendt at the 2012 Giro d'Italia, where he finished third overall after a solo breakaway which led to victory on the penultimate stage.

Grand Tour	2011	2012	2013	2014	2015	2016	2017	2018	2019	2020	2021	2022	2023
Giro d'Italia	—	3	—	65	—	—	—	—	51	41	DNF	74	—
Tour de France	62	—	96	—	67	40	51	65	60	52	82	—	—
Vuelta a España	—	62	DNF	—	DNF	65	57	67	56	—	—	80	99

Legend
—	Did not compete
DNF	Did not finish
