= Rialp =

- Municipality
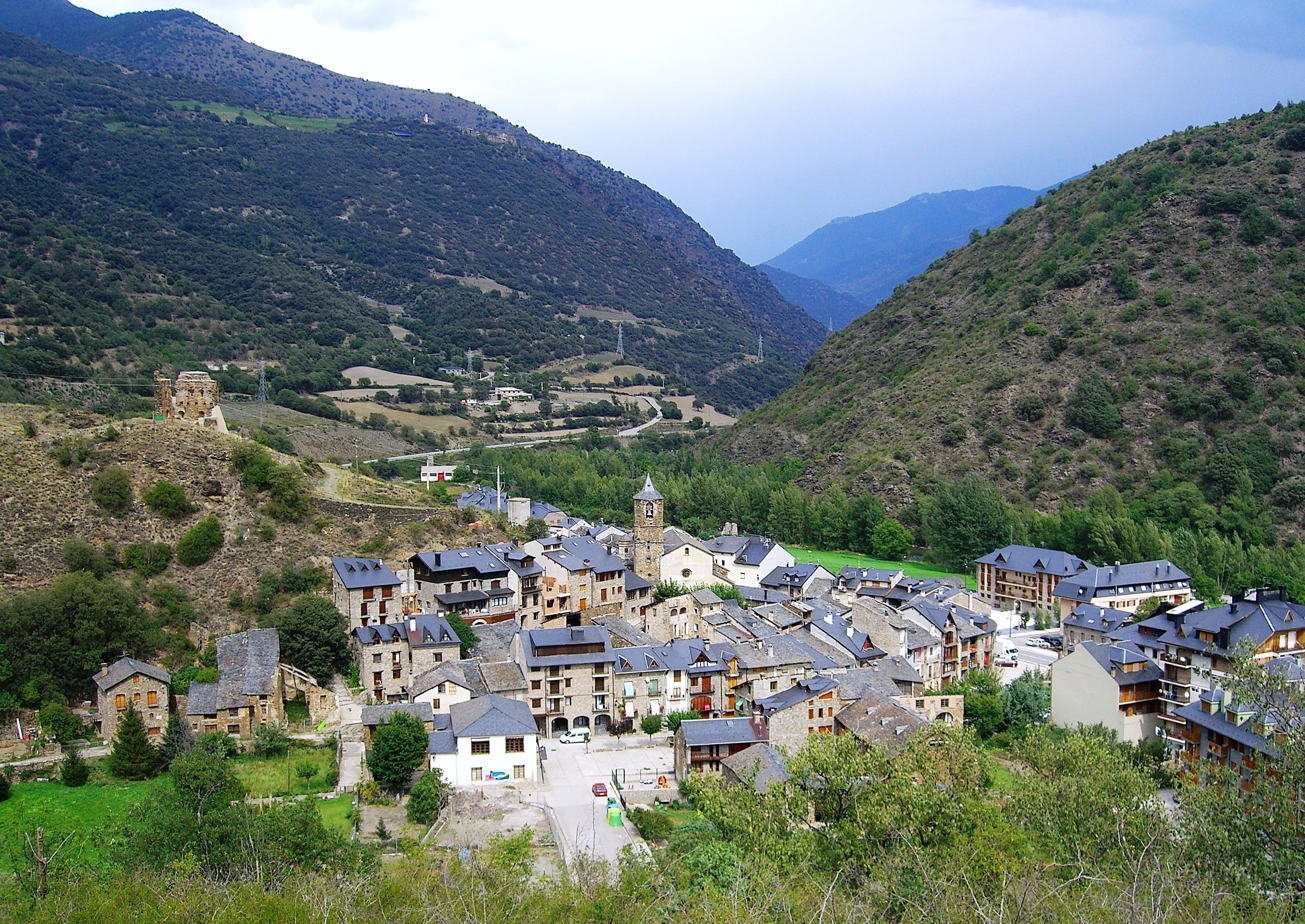
- Rialp

- Flag Coat of arms

- Location in Catalonia Rialp (Catalonia) Rialp (Spain)
- Coordinates: 42°26′N 1°8′E
- Country: Spain
- Community: Catalonia
- Province: Lleida
- Comarca: Pallars Sobirà

Government
  - Mayor: Gerard Sabarich Fernández-Coto (2015)

Area
  - Total: 63.3 km^{2} (24.4 sq mi)

Population (2025-01-01)
  - Total: 654
  - Density: 10.3/km^{2} (26.8/sq mi)
- Website: rialp.cat

Rialb (Catalan pronunciation: [riˈalp]; official name Rialp, still a mandatory change by Francoist legislation) is a village in the province of Lleida and autonomous community of Catalonia, Spain. It has a population of 654 (register office, 2025).
