= Alcalde (surname) =

Alcalde is a Spanish surname related to alcalde, the Spanish title for a mayor. Notable people with the name include:

- Antonio Alcalde Barriga (1701–1792), Spanish Catholic prelate and bishop
- Cristina Alcalde (born 1980), Spanish cyclist
- Gustavo Alcalde (born 1955), Spanish politician
- Jorge Alcalde (1911–2005), Peruvian footballer
- Jorge Alcalde Lagranja (born 1968), Spanish journalist, science advocate and writer
- Luisa María Alcalde Luján (born 1987), Mexican politician
- Manuel Alcalde (1956–2004), Spanish race walker
- Mario Alcalde (1926–1971), American actor
- M. Cristina Alcalde, Peruvian anthropologist and academic
- Moisés Alcalde Virgen (born 1971), Mexican politician
- Núria Aliaga-Alcalde, Spanish chemist and academic
- Pedro Alcalde (born 1959), Spanish musician, composer and conductor
- Tati Alcalde (born 1964), Spanish footballer
- Teodoro Alcalde (1913–1995), Peruvian footballer
- Zenaida Alcalde (born 1981), Spanish circus performer, actress and teacher
