= Núria =

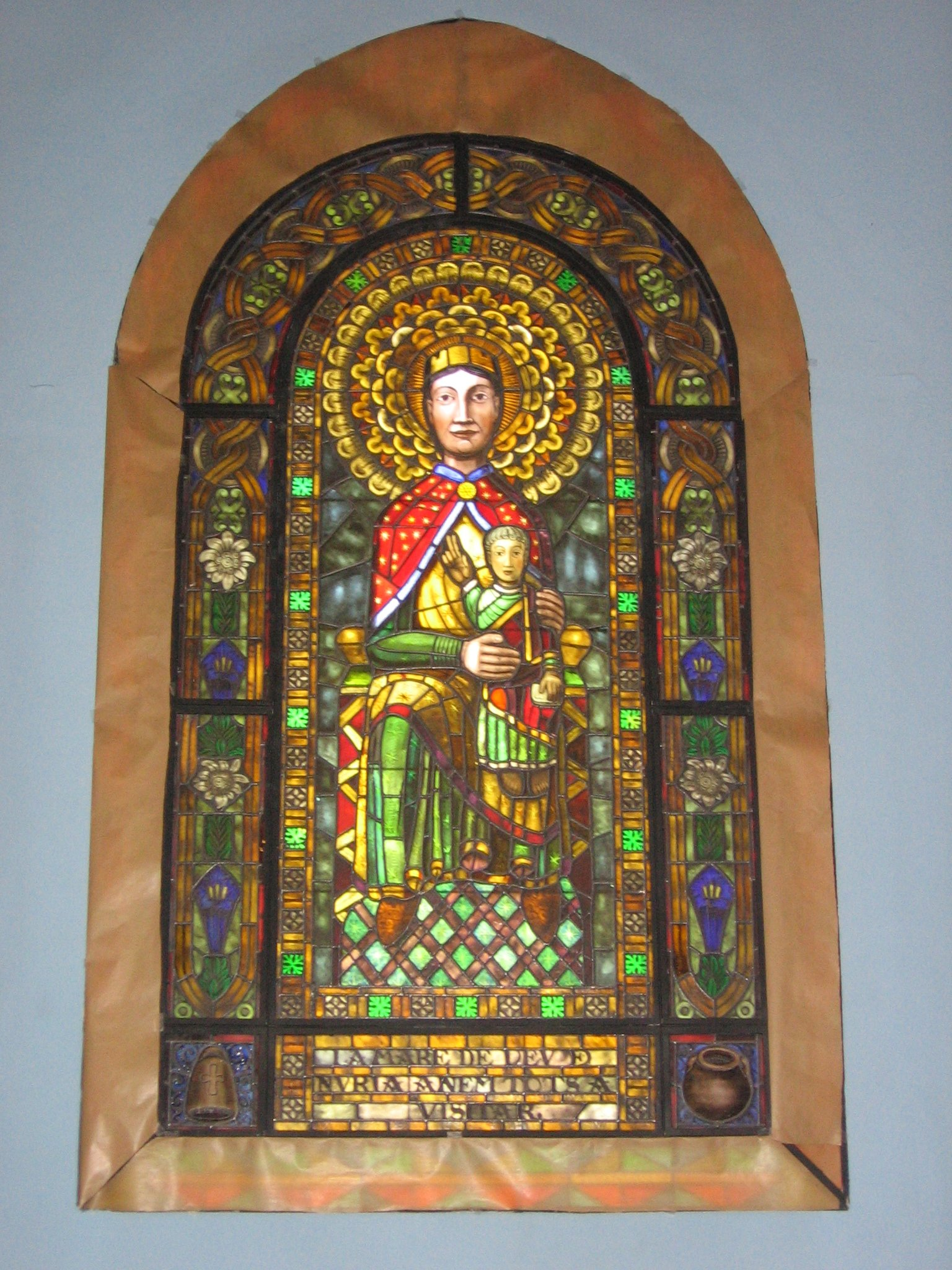
Stained glass in the Sanctuary of the Virgin of Núria

Núria (Eastern Catalan: [ˈnuɾiə]) is a Catalan girls' name taken from the Virgin of Núria, a Marian shrine located in the eponymous valley, the Vall de Núria. The name also occurs in Spanish without the accent as Nuria, given that the Spanish name of the valley is el valle de Nuria.

== Etymology and history ==
The placename, Núria, is believed to be of Basque origin according to Joan Coromines, and related to the word Norra, a variant of Andorra, and meaning "place between valleys."

The name Nuria (Arabic: نوريّة) has also been linked to the Arabic unisex name Nur meaning light.

The name, originally Mare de Déu de Núria, derives from Marian devotion to the Virgin of Nuria (Catalan Mare de Déu de Núria). The name is very popular in Catalonia, especially in the comarques of Ripollès—where the sanctuary is located in the municipality of Queralbs—Priorat, Pallars Jussà, Osona, Noguera, Conca de Barberà, and Cerdanya.

== Popularity ==
In 2007 it was the seventh most common female name in Catalonia, with its most recent peak of popularity recorded in the decade of the 1970s. The Saint's day is September 8, for Our Lady of Nuria.

== Notable people with the name ==
- Núria Aliaga-Alcalde, Spanish chemist
- Núria Añó (born 1973), Spanish writer and novelist
- Nuria Bages (born 1955), Mexican actress
- Nuria Benzal (born 1985), Spanish handball player
- Nuria Bermúdez (born 1980), Spanish football agent and actress
- Nuria Cabanillas (born 1980), Spanish rhythmic gymnast and Olympic champion
- Núria Camón (born 1978), Spanish field hockey player
- Nuria Domínguez (born 1974), Canadian-born Spanish competition rower
- Núria Espert (born 1935), Spanish actress
- Nuria Fernández (born 1976), Spanish middle-distance runner
- Nuria Fernández Gómez, "Nuria Fergó" (born 1979), Spanish singer and actress
- Nuria González (born 1962), Spanish actress
- Nuria Gorrite (born 1970), Swiss-Spanish politician
- Nuria Llagostera Vives (born 1980), Spanish tennis player
- Núria López, Spanish chemistry professor
- Nuria Lopez Bigas, Spanish biologist
- Núria Madruga (born 1980), Portuguese actress and model
- Nuria Martínez (born 1984), Spanish professional basketball player in the WNBA
- Nuria Moreno (born 1975), Spanish field hockey player
- Nuria Olivé (born 1968), Spanish field hockey player
- Nuria Párrizas Díaz (born 1991), Spanish tennis player
- Nuria Piera (born 1960), Dominican Republic investigative journalist
- Nuria Pomares, Spanish ballet dancer
- Núria Pradas (born 1954), Spanish philologist and writer
- Nuria Quevedo (1938–2025), Spanish-German painter and graphic artist
- Núria Rial, Spanish soprano
- Nuria Roca, Spanish TV presenter
- Nuria Torray (1934–2004), Spanish film, television, and theatre actress
- Nuria Zufía, Spanish footballer
