= Pomares =

Pomares is a surname. Notable people with the surname include:

- Alba Pomares (born 1995), Spanish footballer
- Kiko Pomares (born 1998), Andorran footballer
- Mercedes Pomares (1954–2024), Cuban volleyball player
- Nuria Pomares, Spanish dancer

== See also ==
- Germán Pomares Championship, a baseball competition in Nicaragua
