= Vall de Núria Rack Railway =

Mountain railway line in Spain

Coordinates: 42°24′N 02°09′E

Cremallera de Núria
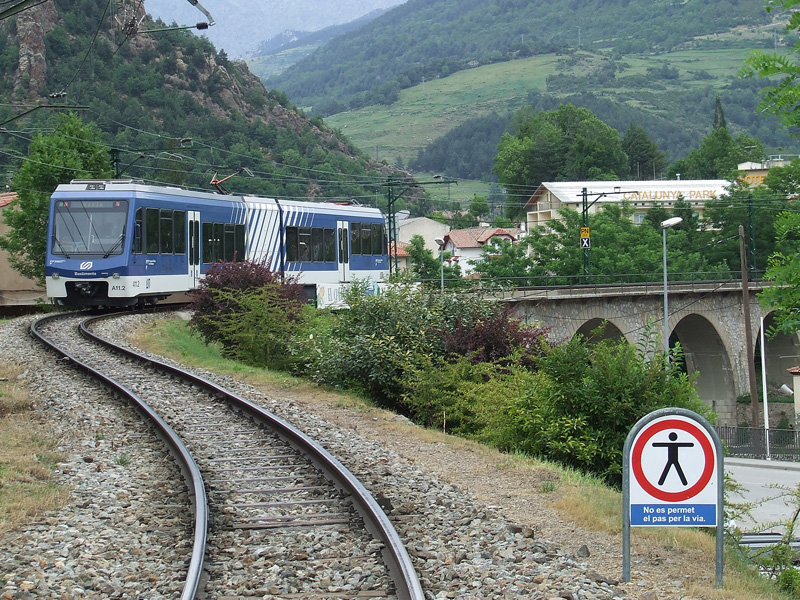
- A Stadler GTW train on the adhesion section of the line.

Overview
- Owner: Ferrocarrils de la Generalitat de Catalunya
- Locale: Pyrenees in the north of Catalonia

History
- Opened: March 22, 1931

Technical
- Line length: 12.5 km (7.8 mi)
- Rack system: Abt
- Track gauge: 1,000 mm (3 ft 3 3/8 in) metre gauge
- Electrification: 1500 V DC Overhead line
- Maximum incline: 15%

The Vall de Núria Rack Railway (Catalan: Cremallera de Núria, IPA: [kɾəməˈʎeɾə ðə ˈnuɾiə]) is a mountain railway in the Pyrenees mountains in the north of the Catalonia region of Spain. The line connects Ribes de Freser with Queralbs and Vall de Núria in Ripollès, Girona. As Queralbs is the highest point in the valley reachable by road, the rack railway is – along with the old footpath / mule track – the only way to reach the shrine and ski resort at Núria.

The line opened on March 22, 1931, and has been electrically operated from the start. It became part of the Ferrocarrils de la Generalitat de Catalunya (FGC) on January 2, 1984, and remains in their ownership. The line connects to the main R3 line at Ribes de Freser, but the stations have separate access.

The line is 12.5 km (7.8 mi) long and has a rail gauge of 1,000 mm (3 ft 3 3/8 in). The first 5.5 km (3.4 mi) of the line is operated by conventional rail adhesion. The remainder of the line is operated as a rack railway, using the Abt system and with a maximum gradient of 15%. In total the line overcomes a height difference of 1,062 m (3,484 ft). The line is electrified with an overhead supply at 1500 V DC.

== Rolling stock ==
Three generations of rolling stock exist on the line. The original stock consisted of passenger cars hauled by four six-wheeled electric locomotives, numbered E1-E4, built by SLM and BBC in 1930–31. They were supplemented by four two-car electric trains numbered A5-A8, built by SLM and BBC in 1985.

The final generation is represented by two low-floor electric motor coaches of type Stadler GTW and numbered A10-A11, built by Stadler Rail in Switzerland in 2003. The line also owns a diesel rack locomotive, D9, used on works trains and to push the snow plough.

Cars A10 and A11 are identical to the rolling stock of the Montserrat Rack Railway. The Montserrat line is also owned by the FGC and some stock is shared between the lines. Locomotive E4 is transferred for use on work trains.

Rolling stock of the Montserrat Rack Railway are listed, if they are or were also used in Vall Núria

Picture link	Number, name	type (UIC)	Year built	History	Additional info
	E1 Virgen de Nuria; E2 Obispo Guitarat; E3 José Rogent * E4 Ramon Albó	Cb g2	1930	SLM 3368/BBC 2969; SLM 3369/BBC 2970; SLM 3370/BBC 2971; SLM 3371/BBC 2972	E1 in working condition E2/E3 Monument *ex Elias Rogent; E4 2003 to Montserrat
	A5 Puigmal; A6 Torreneules; A7 Taga; A8 Balandrau	(Aa1)(Aa1)+(Aa1)(Aa1) g4	1986; 1986; 1986; 1995	MTM/SLM/BBC	
	D9	Bbo de	1995	Stadler 237/SLM/ABB	Also used on the Montserrat line D9
	L09	2 dhs	1995	Stadler 238/MAN/Zaugg	Rotary snow plough L09+D9
	DM6	Bbo de	2004	Stadler	Built for Montserrat line, transferred to Vall Núria in 2006 DM6
	A10 Noufonts; A11 Bastiments	2'Bbo 2' g2d	2003	Stadler 825–826	Cogwheel-GTW, same as AM1–AM5 (Montserrat). A10 transferred to Montserrat and repainted with Montserrat Rack Railway colors. It was renamed to "La Roca Foradada". A11 will be transferred soon to Montserrat.
	H12	2'Bbo g2d-de	2019	Stadler	Dual-mode electro-diesel locomotive
	11, 12, 21, 22, 23	B	1930	Abffw 11–12; Bffw 21–23	12 = Cinema carriage 22 = Monument with E2
	51	As	1930	Aaffw 51	Saloon
	01, 28	Haik	1930	Affw 1**, Bffw 28	Box car
	02, 03, PM02	R	1930	Affw 2, Bffw 25, 24	Flat car (PM02 = Montserrat)
	27, 29	X	1930	Bffw 27, 29**	Service vehicle (27 = Montserrat) 29
	70.951; K53–K54	Gk	1930	K52–K54	Small box cars 70.951 ex K 52 = Tank car
	M44, 062	Kklm	1930	M44,M??	062 = Montserrat
	P22–P26	Kkp	1964, 62	MGB/FO Uce 4861,62,67, MGB/FO Gb-v 4433', MGB/BVZ K 2641 (1962, 1989 ex X 2906)	Flat cars P24 with cement mixer P25–P26 with thermic container
	P27−P28	B	1949	MGB/FO B 4244–45 ex SBB A 182–183 (SWS)	Bought in 2008, still with original livery, 4244 with auxiliary cab
	B 2273 and Bt 2275	B	1963/98/19	MGB/BVZ B 2273 and 2275 (SIG, 1998 verlängert)	Bought in 2019, used with H12 and repainted blue in 2020 to match that locomotive
	364.01	2 g1	1930	SLM 3469/BBC 3680	Rotary snow plough
	KCw 29	Fd			Service vehicle for track ballast
	T5	X			Catenary car, without cogwheel

**) Original roster, built by Vereinigte Westdeutsche Waggonfabrik A.G., is said to have been formed of Affw 2, ABffw 11–15, Bffw 21–28 and Aaffw 51. However, box car 01 was rebuilt from Affw 1 and there was a Bffw 29; at the same time ABffw 13–15 and Bffw 26 were off the roster.

== See also ==
- List of highest railways in Europe
