= Jorge Alcalde Lagranja =

Spanish journalist (born 1968)

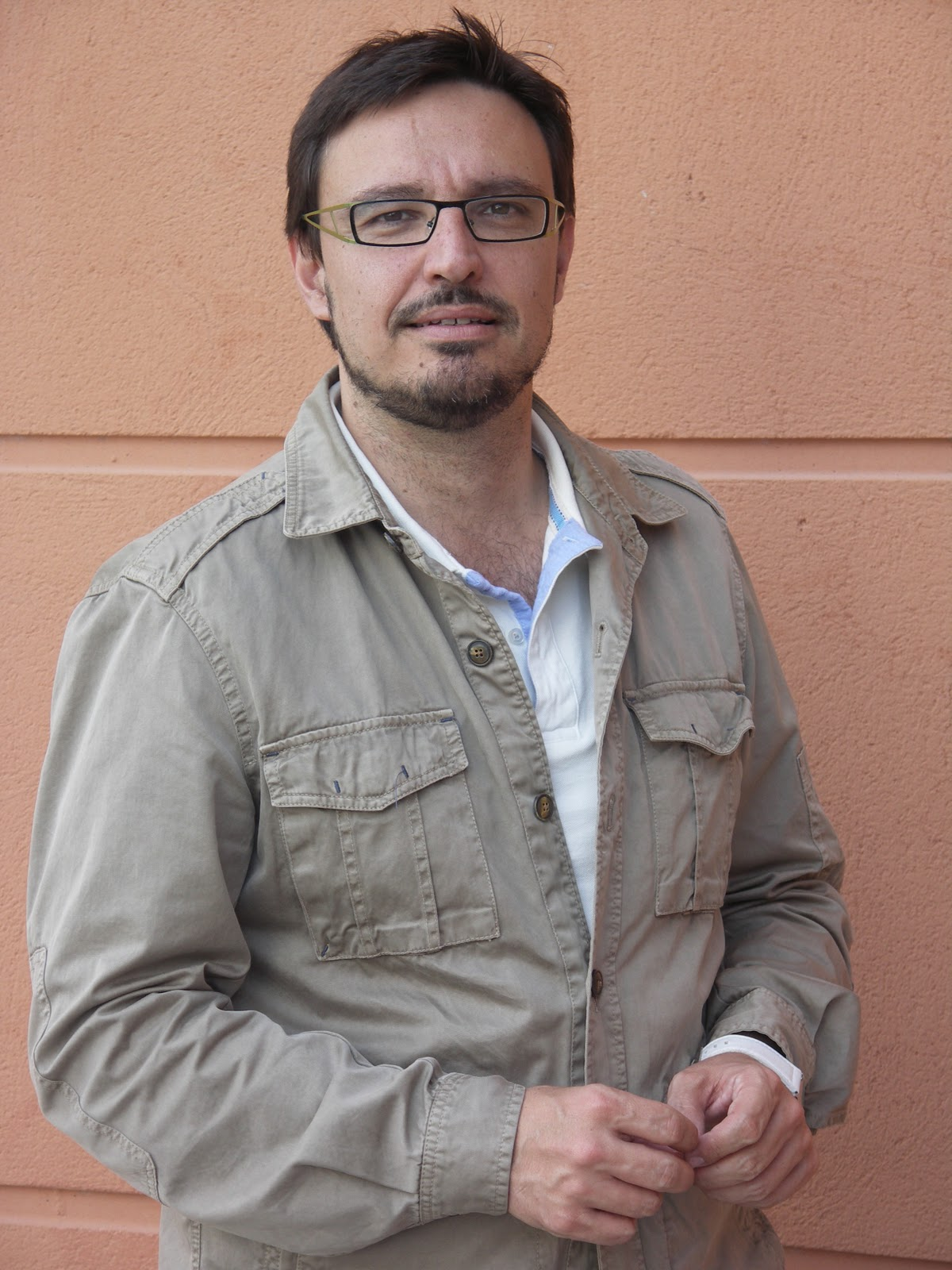
- Alcalde, October 2013
- Born: August 19, 1968 (age 58); Spain
- Education: Complutense University of Madrid (B.S., 2017); University of South Florida
- Occupation: Spanish journalist
- Known for: A popularizer of science in the press, radio, and television
- Scientific career
- Thesis: Director of Quo and director of Esquire

Jorge Alcalde Lagranja (August 19, 1968) is a Spanish journalist, science advocate and writer. He was the director of Quo magazine from 2007 until 2019. He is currently director of Esquire, since 2017, and collaborator of COPE programs. He graduated in Information sciences at the Complutense University of Madrid and is also a graduate in communication from the University of South Florida (Tampa).

== History ==
Jorge Alcalde is an advocate of science in the press, radio, and television, and was the editor-in-chief of Muy Interesante. He has also worked for the magazines Tiempo, GEO, and El Europeo . On the other hand, he has participated in various television programs and in newspapers such as El Mundo and ABC.

In addition to managing the Quo magazine, he is a regular contributor to the COPE network, where he returned in office in 2012 after collaborating for three seasons in esRadio. He combines both tasks with his usual collaboration in La Razón and maintained a weekly column in Libertad Digital. He was also the director and presenter of the TV programs Factor 2.1 and Vive la Ciencia (Libertad Digital TV).

Since October 2017, he has directed the Spanish edition of the men's magazine Esquire, edited by Hearst Spain, a subsidiary of the Hearst Corporation.

He has participated in the start-up of several science museums in Spain and is the author of several books.

== Published books ==
- Jorge Alcalde Lagranja ( 2005 ). The lights of energy, Ed. Fundación Iberdrola. 292 p. ISBN 978-84-609-4455-3
- Jorge Alcalde Lagranja ( 2007 ). The lies of climate change, Ed. LibrosLibres. 211 p. ISBN 978-84-96088-70-2
- Jorge Alcalde Lagranja ( 2009 ). The lies of the paranormal: What is learned from science investigating the mysteries of the "dark zone", Ed. Libroslibres. 204 p. ISBN 978-84-92654-04-8
- Jorge Alcalde Lagranja ( 2010 ). I need you, dad, a reflection for future parents, happy parents and parents who are not allowed to be, Ed. Libroslibres. 190 p. ISBN 978-84-92654-29-1
- Jorge Alcalde Lagranja ( 2011 ). The night of the king, Ed. Today's Topics. 411 p. ISBN 978-84-9998-035-5
- Jorge Alcalde Lagranja ( 2015 ). Why don't astronauts cry? Ed. Planet. 317p. ISBN 978-84-08-14195-2
- Jorge Alcalde Lagranja ( 2017 ). Archimedes, the theorem, Ed. Planeta. 288p. ISBN 978-84-08-16859-1

== Awards and honors ==
He has received several prizes for broadcasting such as the Prism of the Casa de las Ciencias de La Coruña, and the FECYT and TECNALIA prizes for scientific journalism. He has been a qualifier for the Boehringer Ingelheim prize for health journalism.
