= Vall de Núria =

Valley in Catalonia, Spain

Coordinates: 42°24′N 02°09′E

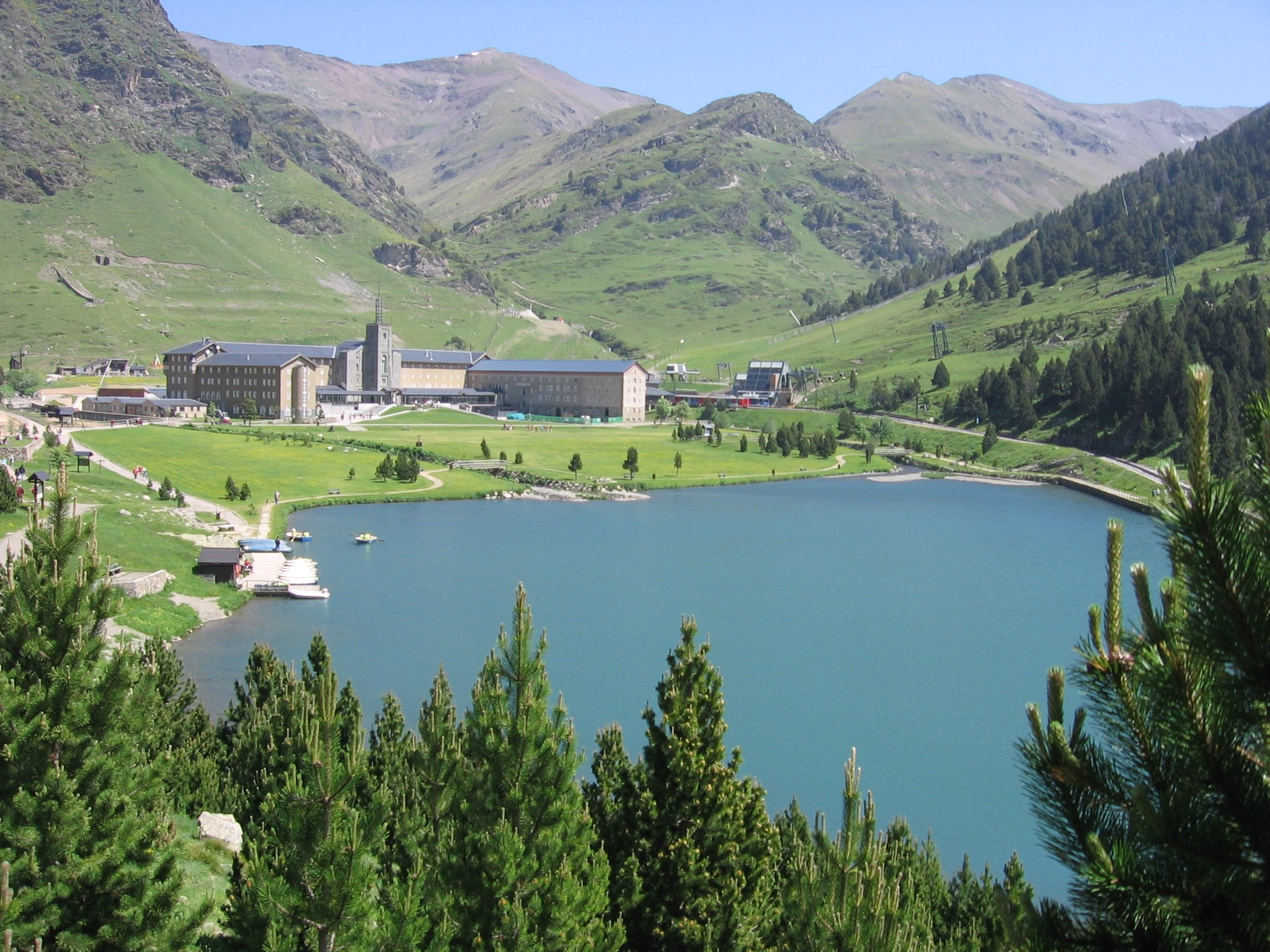
Vall de Núria - Summer view of mountain resort, sanctuary and reservoir

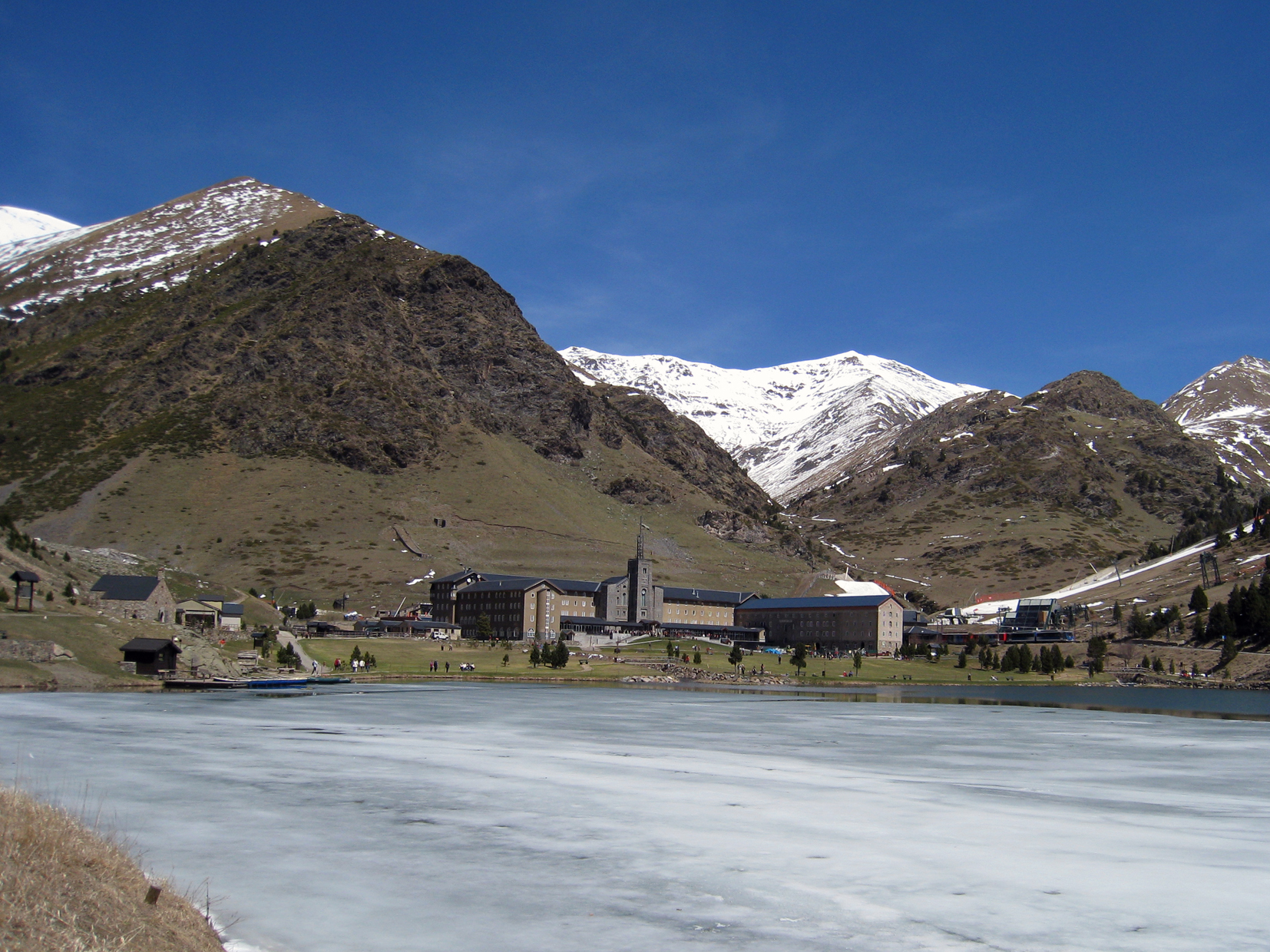
Vall de Núria - Winter view of mountain resort, sanctuary and reservoir

Vall de Núria (Catalan pronunciation: [lə ˈβaʎ də ˈnuɾiə], "The Valley of Núria") is a south-opening valley coming down from the crest of the Pyrenees within the municipality of Queralbs, province of Girona, community of Catalonia, Spain.

The floor of the valley lies about 2,000 metres (6,600 ft) above sea level and is accessible from the south via a rack railway (the Vall de Núria Rack Railway) or by foot, and from France to the north by footpaths. There are no roads to access the valley. The place is historically notable for the 1931 drafting of the first Catalan Statute of Autonomy, in the Sanctuary of the Virgin of Núria.

== The Virgin of Núria ==
According to tradition, Saint Giles (Catalan: Sant Gil) arrived in the valley in approximately 700 AD and lived there for four years. He crafted an image of the Virgin Mary and hid it in a cave when forced to flee from persecution by the Arabs against Christians. Along with the image of the Virgin, he left a pot used for cooking, a cross, and a bell for calling shepherds to meals.

According to tradition, a pilgrim named Amadéu began searching for the image in 1072, after having a prophetic dream. He built a small chapel for pilgrims, and found the image seven years later, next to the pot, the cross, and the bell, and he brought the objects to the chapel to be venerated.

The image has been dated to have been made during the 12th or 13th century. It is a wooden Romanesque carving. The primitive-looking polychrome statue retains its painting intact.

On July 13 1967, the statue was canonically crowned with a decree from Pope Paul VI.

The shepherds regarded the image of the Blessed Virgin as a patron saint of fertility. The canonical consecration of Our Lady of Núria was made in 1965. Her feast day is September 8. The name Núria is now a popular girl's name in Catalonia.

== Climate ==
The elevated terrain of the Vall de Núria and its relative proximity to the Mediterranean result in a relatively humid high mountain climate. Winter is the season with the least precipitation and the most irregular weather, although it usually comes in the form of snow.

The duration of snow covering the ground varies greatly from year to year. At the Núria sanctuary, in recent years, it has ranged from 62 to 64 days. At higher altitudes, the snow lasts considerably longer. In areas where snow accumulates, snowdrifts form, which may not fully melt until late summer.

Temperatures are cold or cool throughout the year, progressively dropping with altitude. January is typically the coldest month, while July and August are the warmest.

Meteorological Parameters for Vall de Núria
Month	Jan.	Feb.	Mar.	Apr.	May	Jun.	Jul.	Aug.	Sep.	Oct.	Nov.	Dec.	Annual
Max. temp. recorded (°C)	11.4	16.5	23.8	24.2	26.5	30.3	34.4	33	26.6	20.5	17.3	14	34.4
AVG Max. temp. (°C)	-3.3	-2.6	5	8.8	12.3	17.1	22.4	19.6	13.7	8.1	4.8	0.4	
AVG Temp (°C)	-8	-7.1	-1.6	3.2	6	10	13.1	12	7.3	1.1	-2	-6.1	
AVG Min. temp.(°C)	-14.3	-13.8	-8.1	-4.1	-0.2	1.8	6.4	5.2	-0.8	-5.9	-8.6	-11.8	
Min. temp. recorded(°C)	-37.5	-38.4	-30	-22.8	-13	-9.6	-4.8	-8.6	-13.4	-21.2	-28.9	-34.8	-38.4
% precipitation as rain	1	2	18	41	75	86	96	91	65	43	13	1	
% precipitation as snow	99	98	82	59	25	14	4	9	35	57	87	99	

== Ski resort ==
The ski resort in the valley is operated by the same company that operates the Vall de Núria Rack Railway. The resort has 10 alpine ski pistes (three green, three blue, two red and two black), and a special slope for sleighs, totalling 7 kilometres (4.3 mi) of marked pistes. In summer 2006, 18 snow cannons were installed, making a total of 73 cannons. A quad chair lift from the resort base at 1,964 metres (6,444 ft), goes up to its highest point, at 2,252 m.; two platter lifts serve the beginners' area; and a gondola lift ("telecabina") accesses the Pic de l'Àliga youth hostel.

== Gallery ==
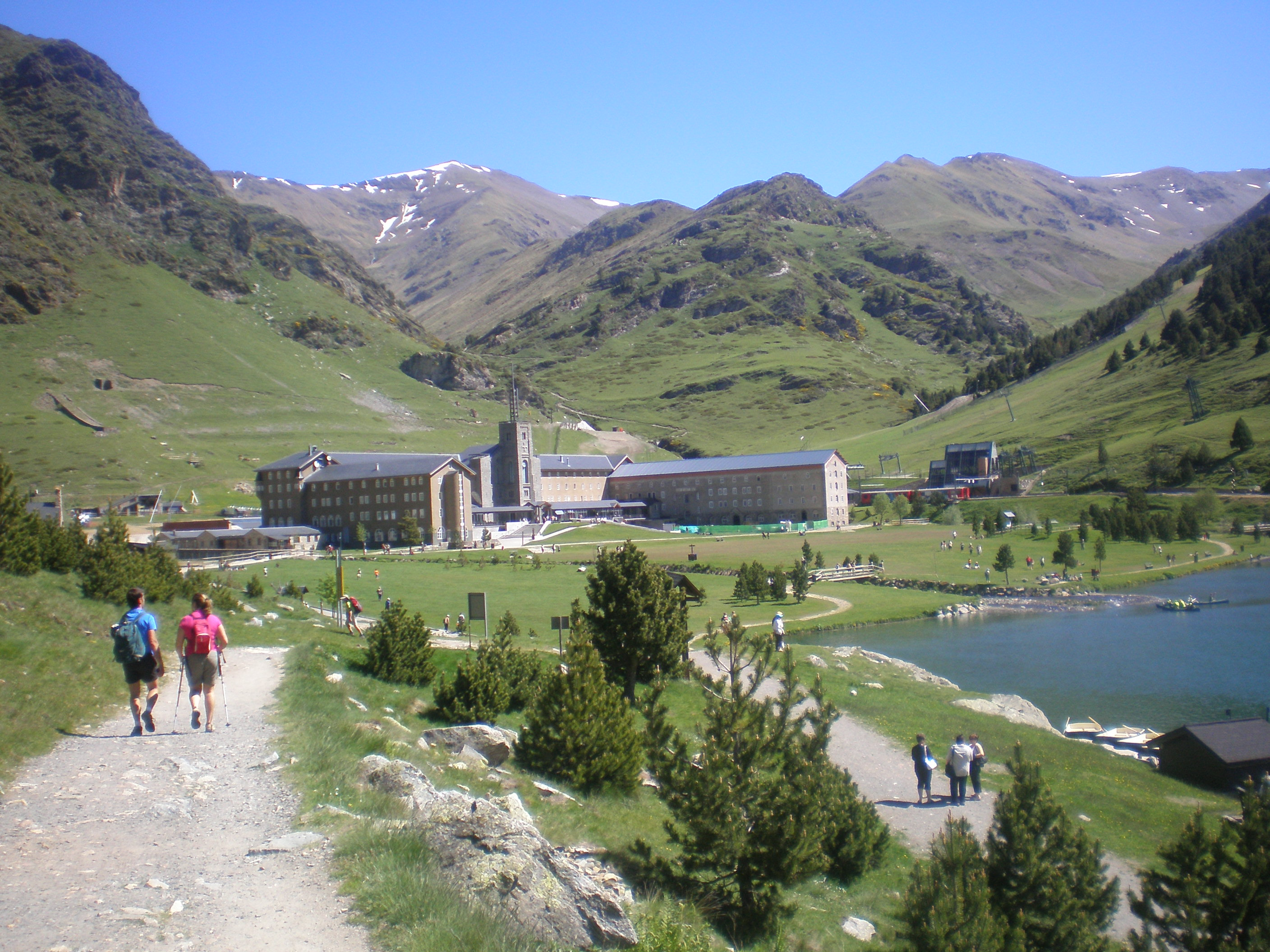
Vall de Núria - Southern access to mountain resort

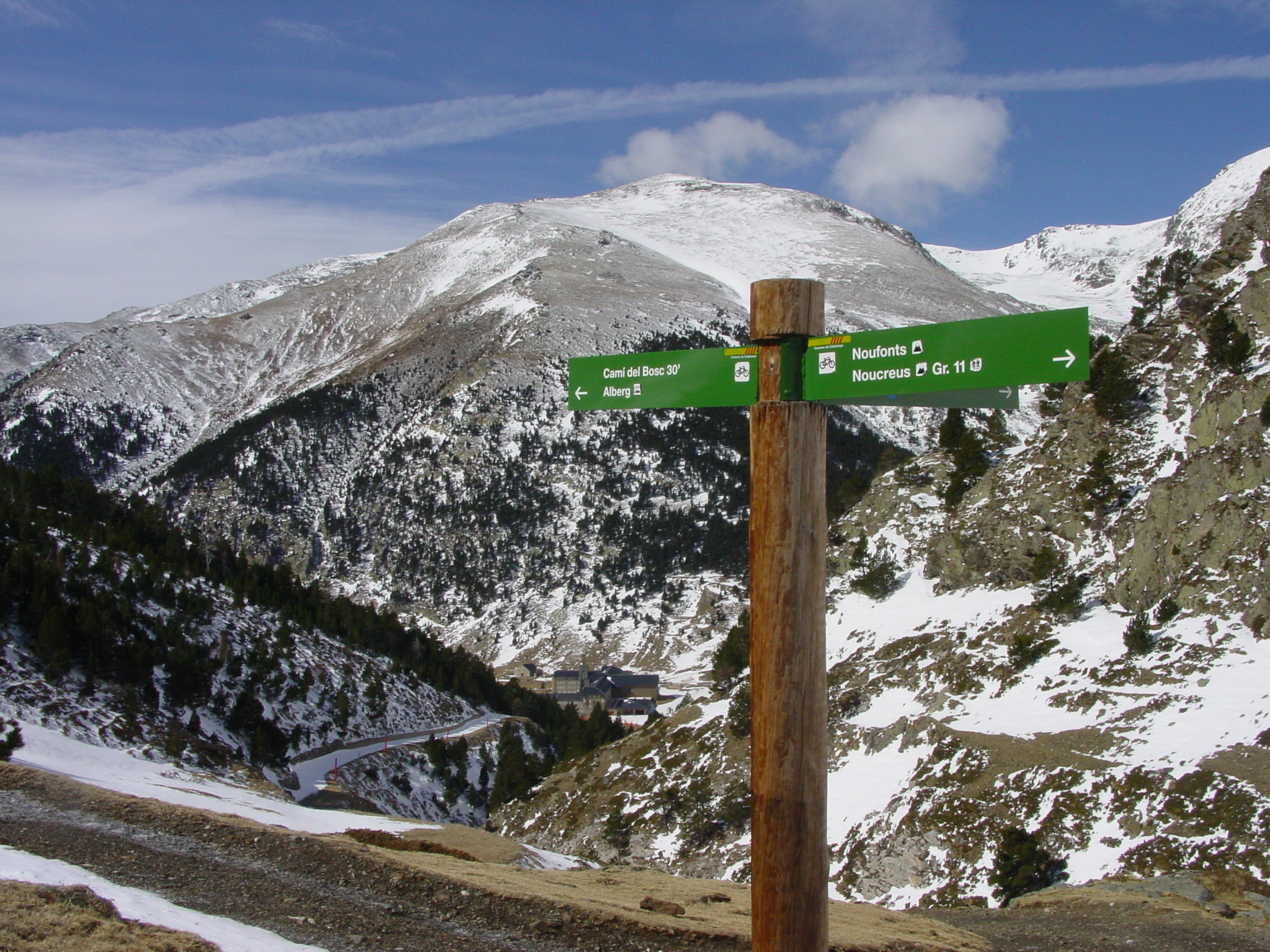
Vall de Núria - Coma de Noucreus (Kettle of Nine Crosses)

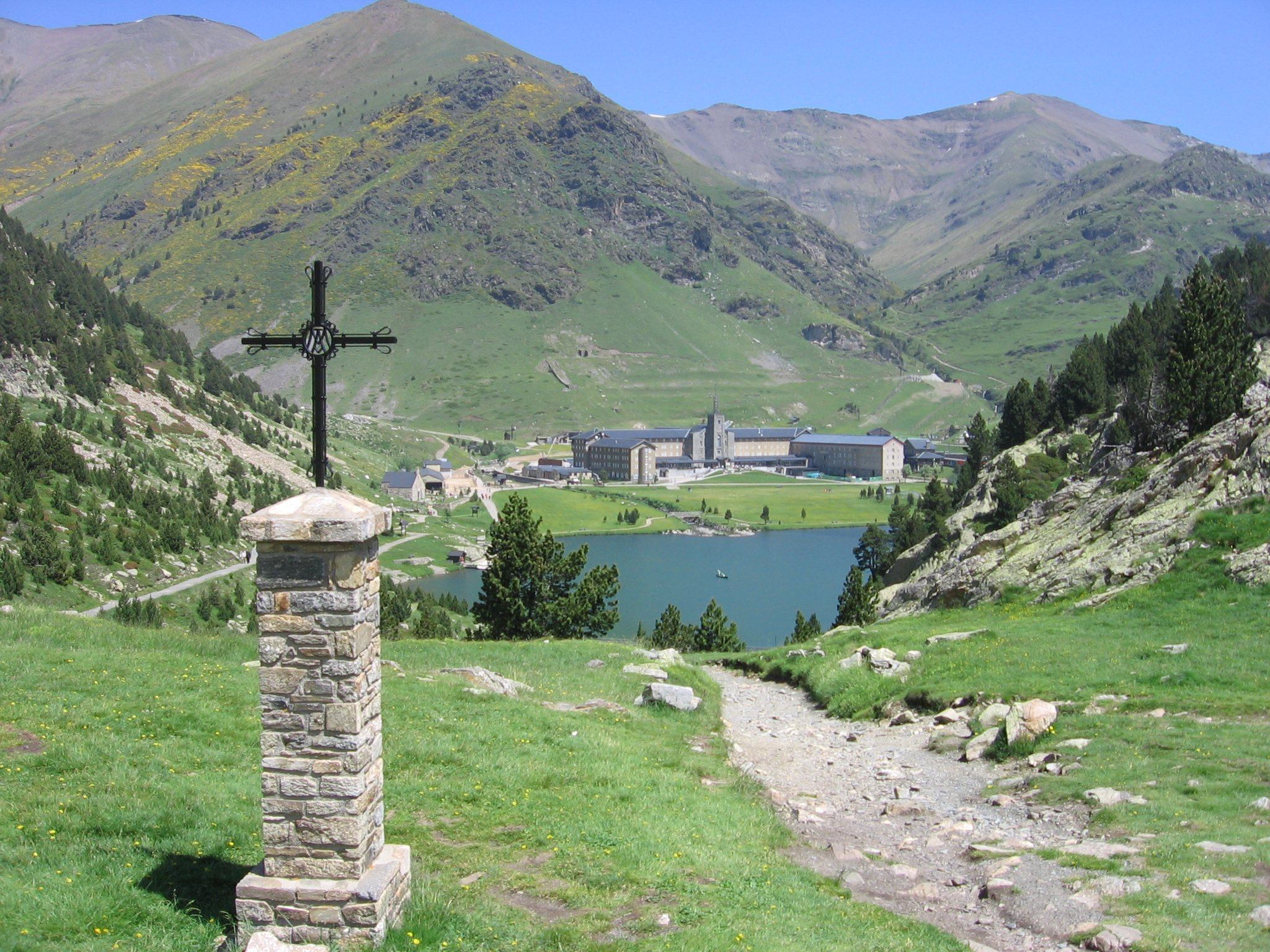
Vall de Núria - Calvary by the southern access

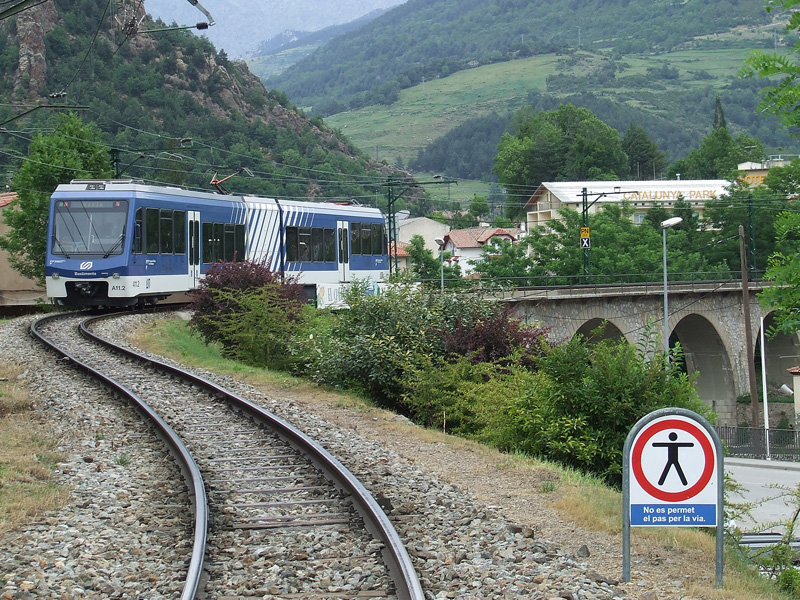
Vall de Núria Rack Railway

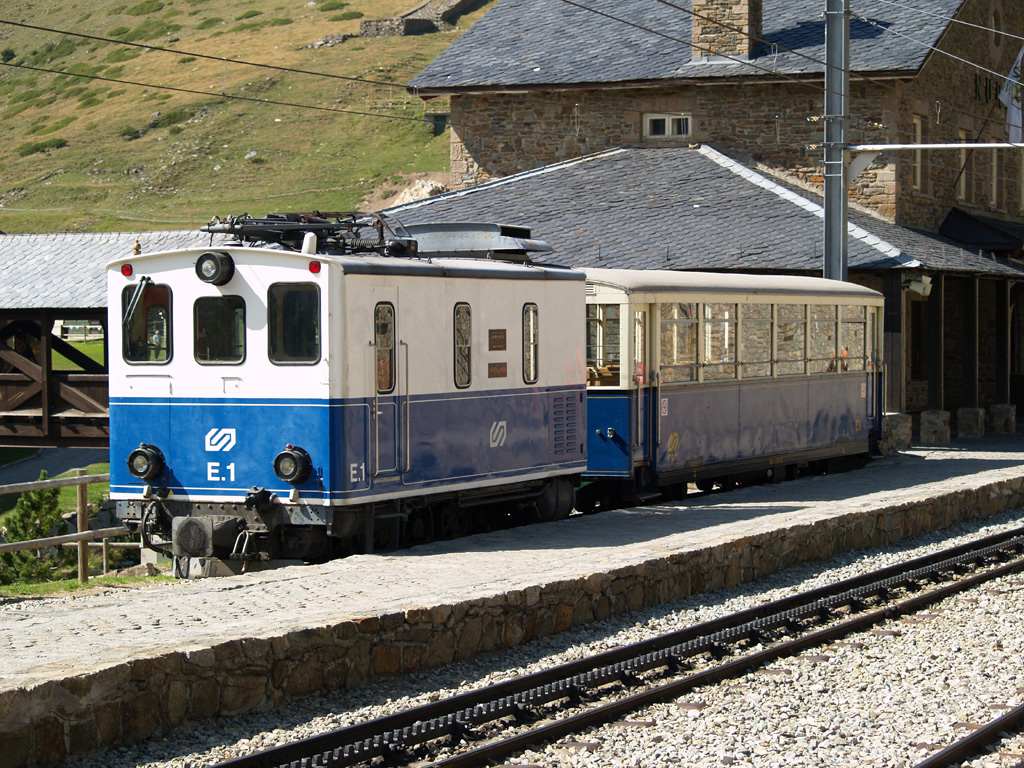
Vall de Núria Rack Railway Station - Old E.1 electric locomotive (Dec. 2006)

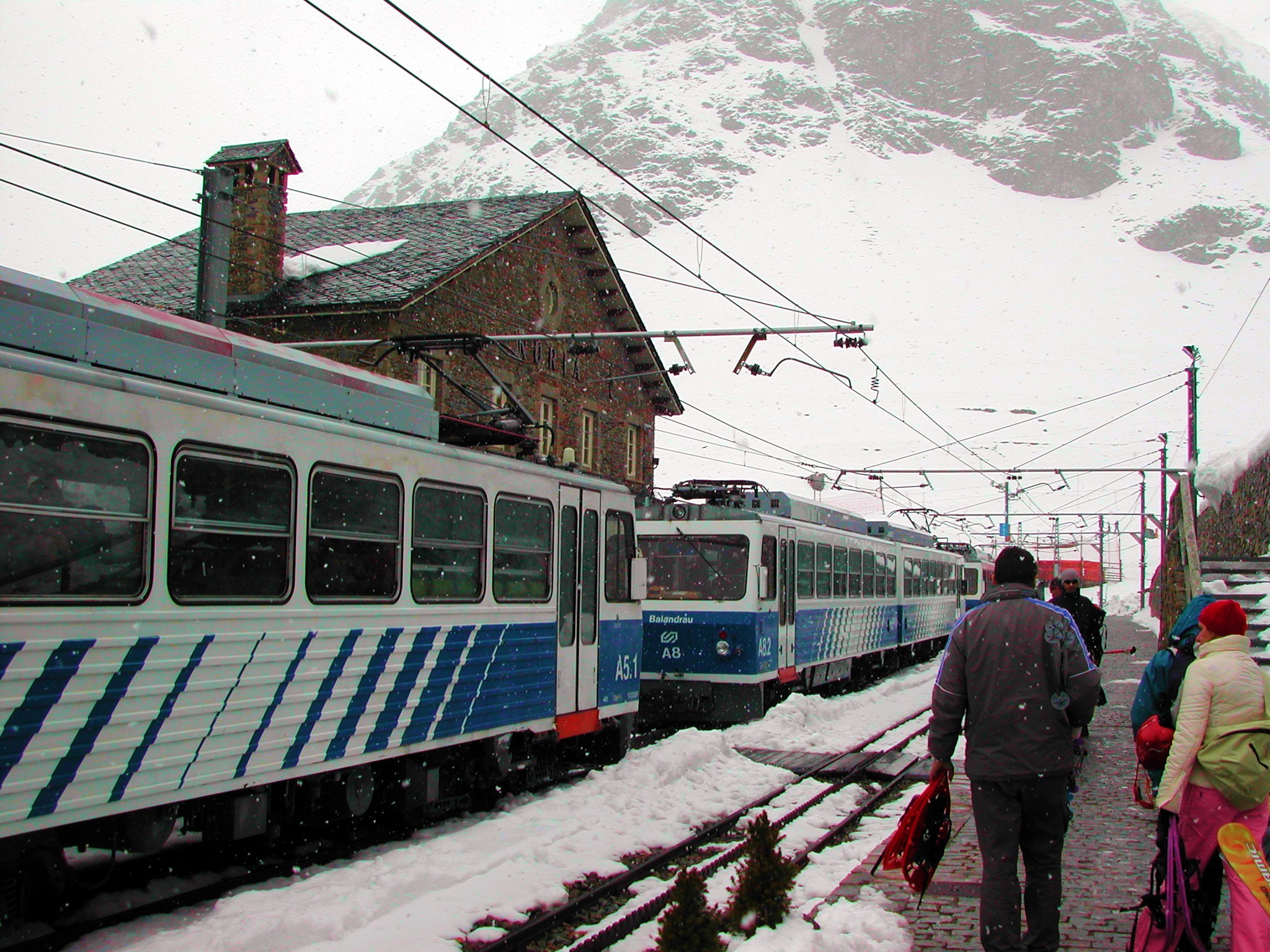
Vall de Núria Rack Railway Station from the platform

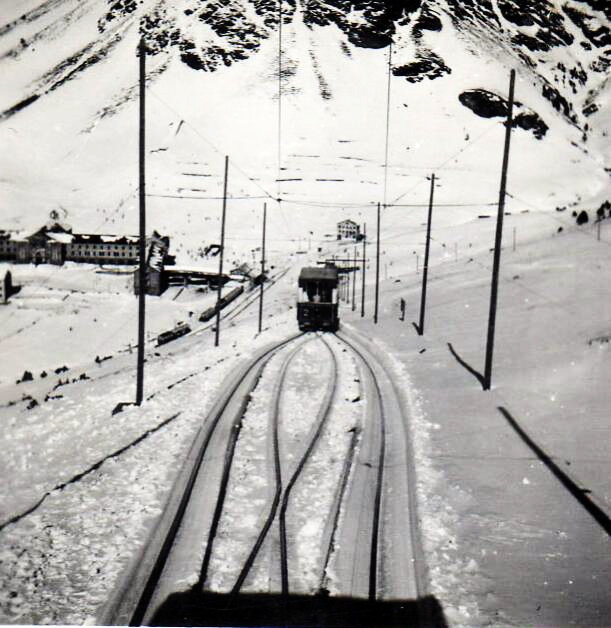
Vall de Núria Rack Railway - Train at Coma del Clot (Dec. 1965)

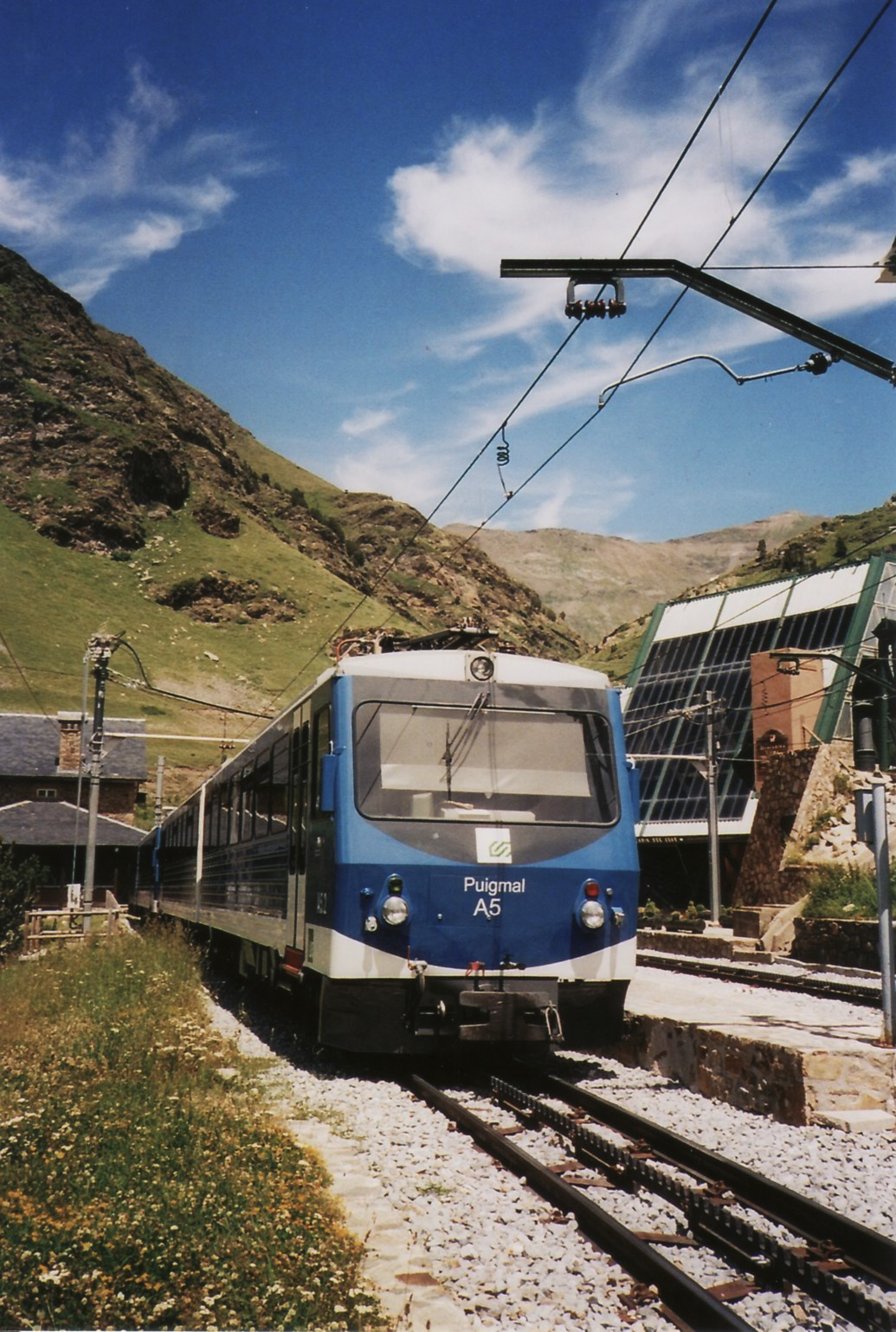
Train on Vall de Núria Rack Railway at Vall de Núria Station (Jul. 2010)

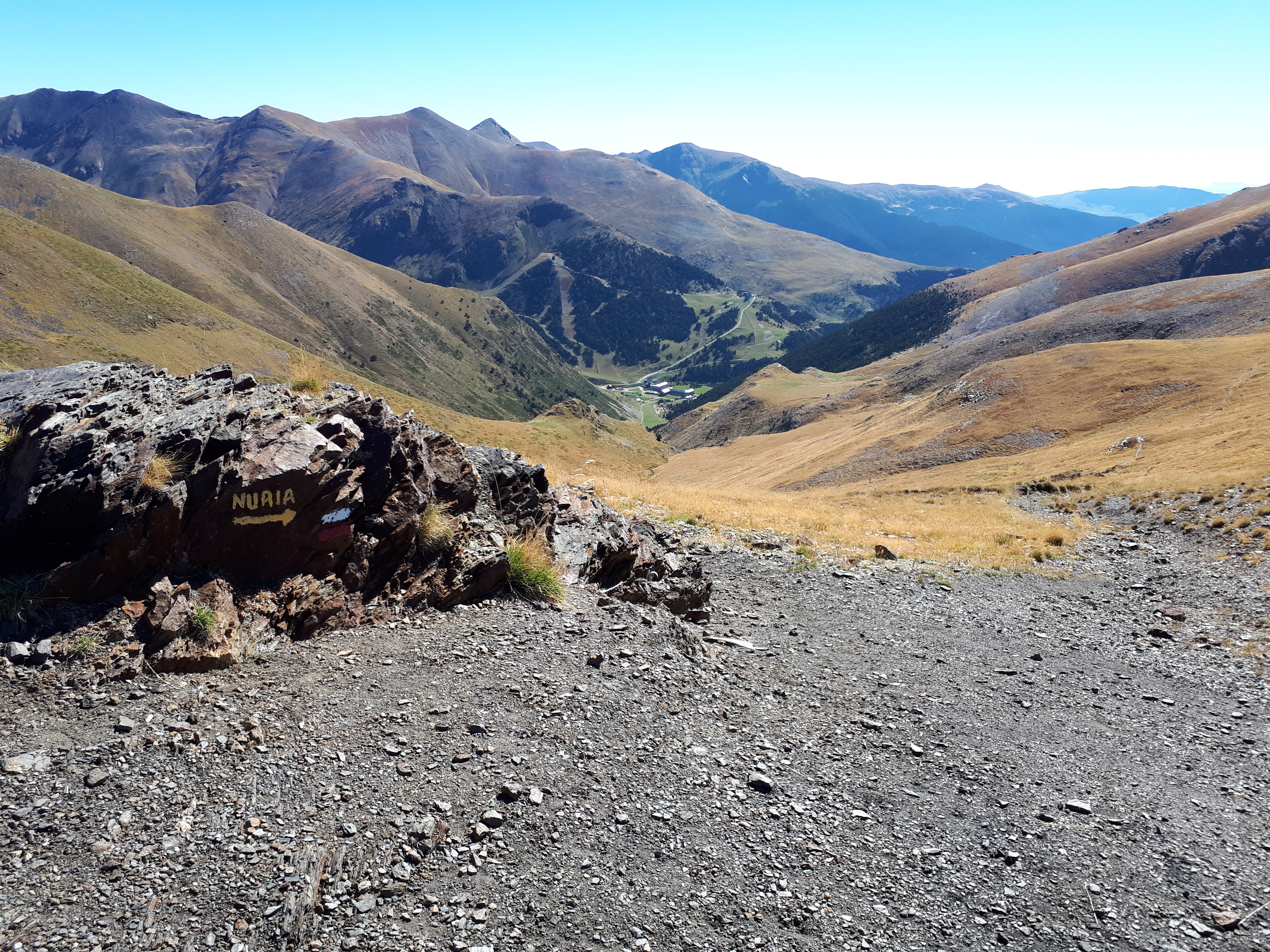
View to the south to Núria, from the Coll de Finestrelles, on the frontier with France.

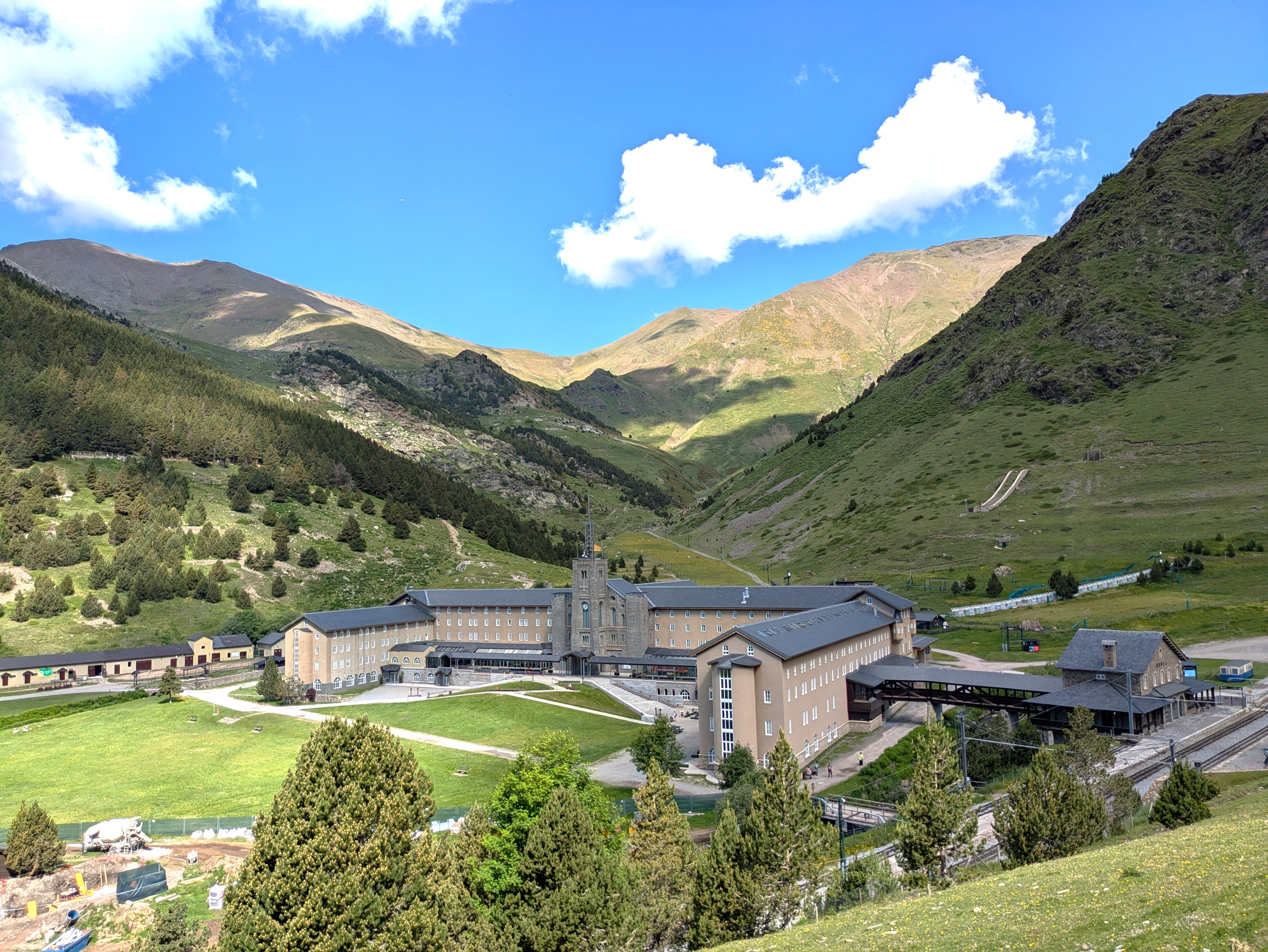
View from Núria up to the Coll de Finestrelles.

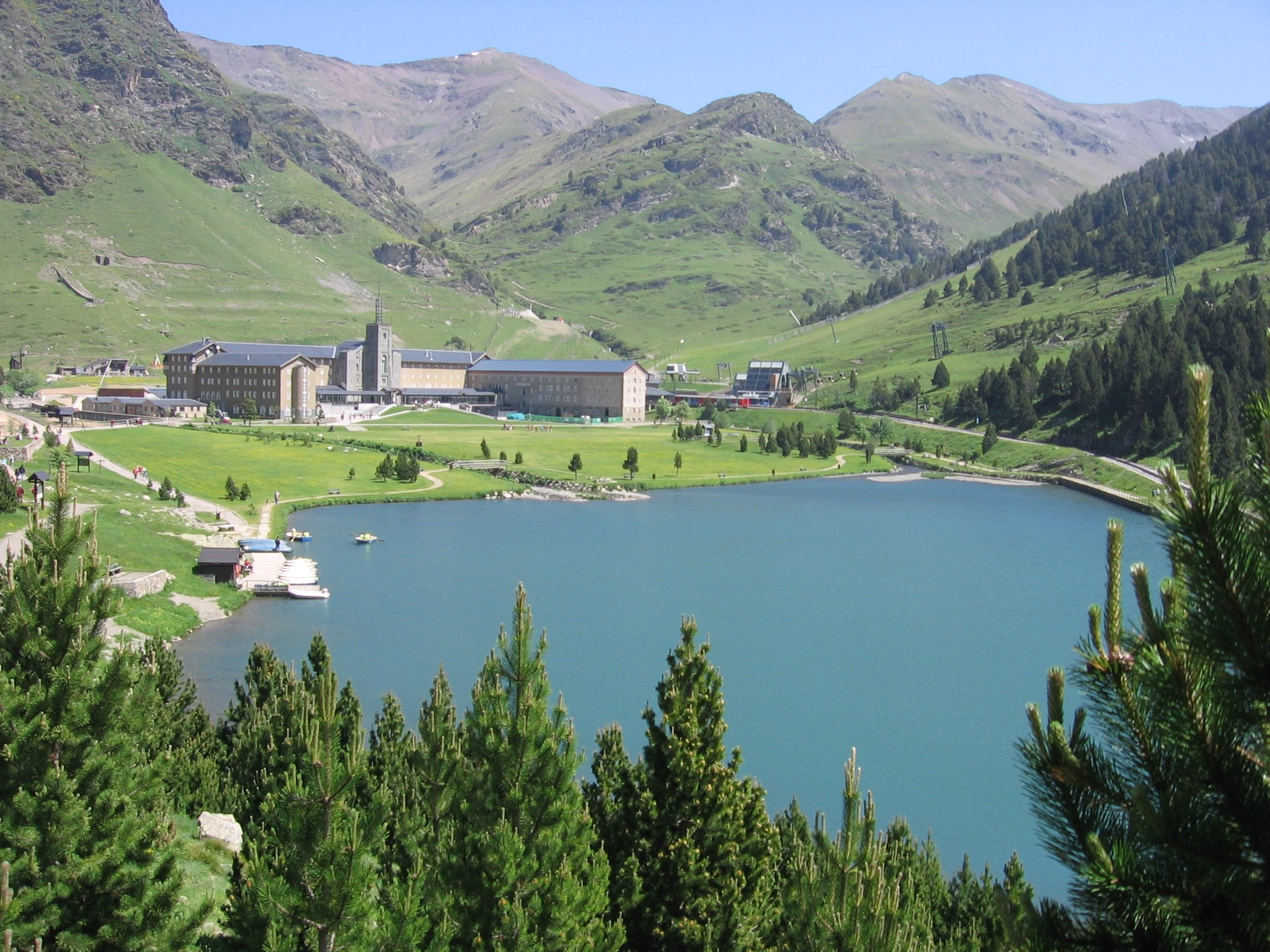
Santuari de la Mare de Déu de Núria

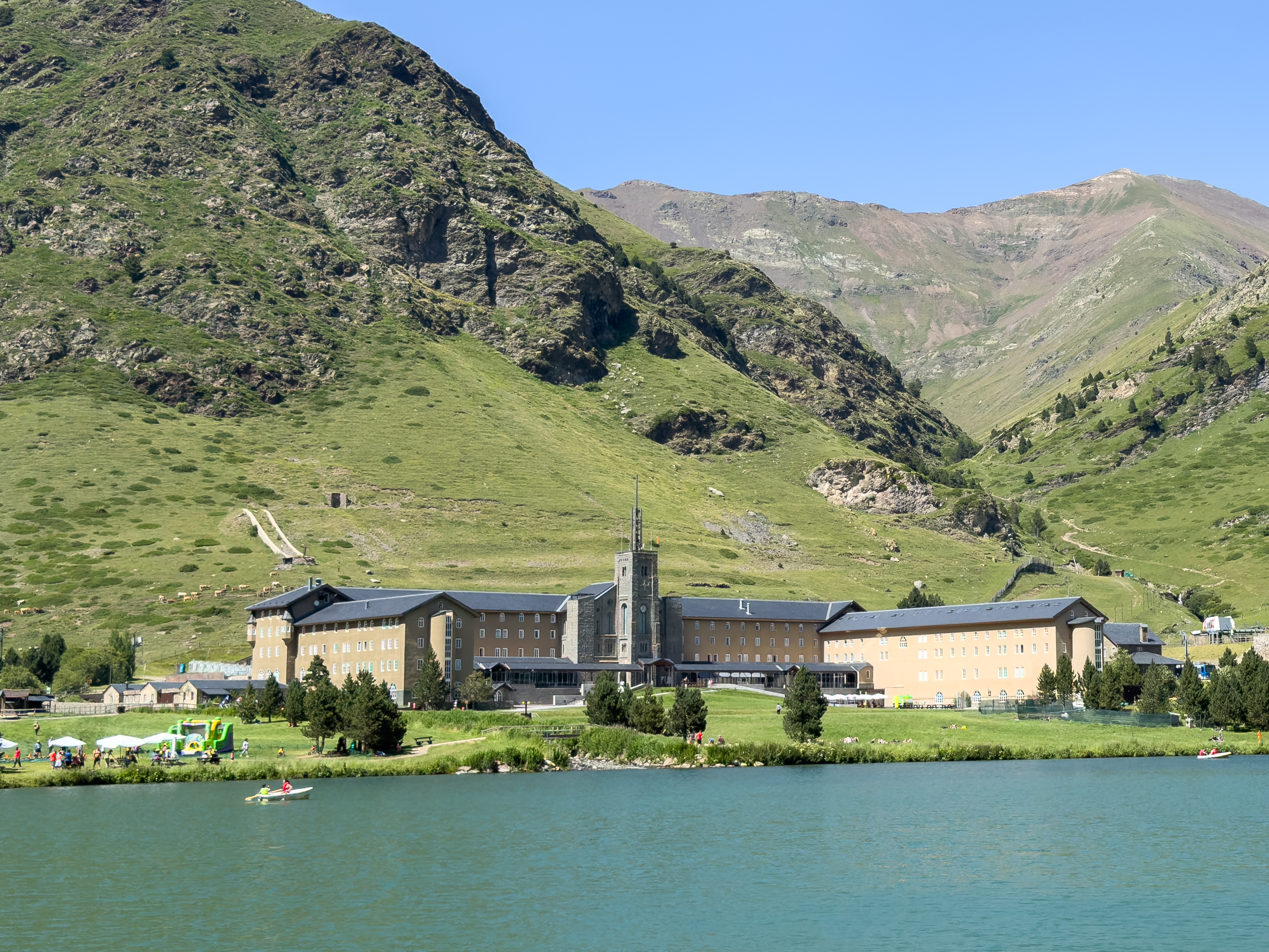
Santuari de la Mare de Déu de Núria

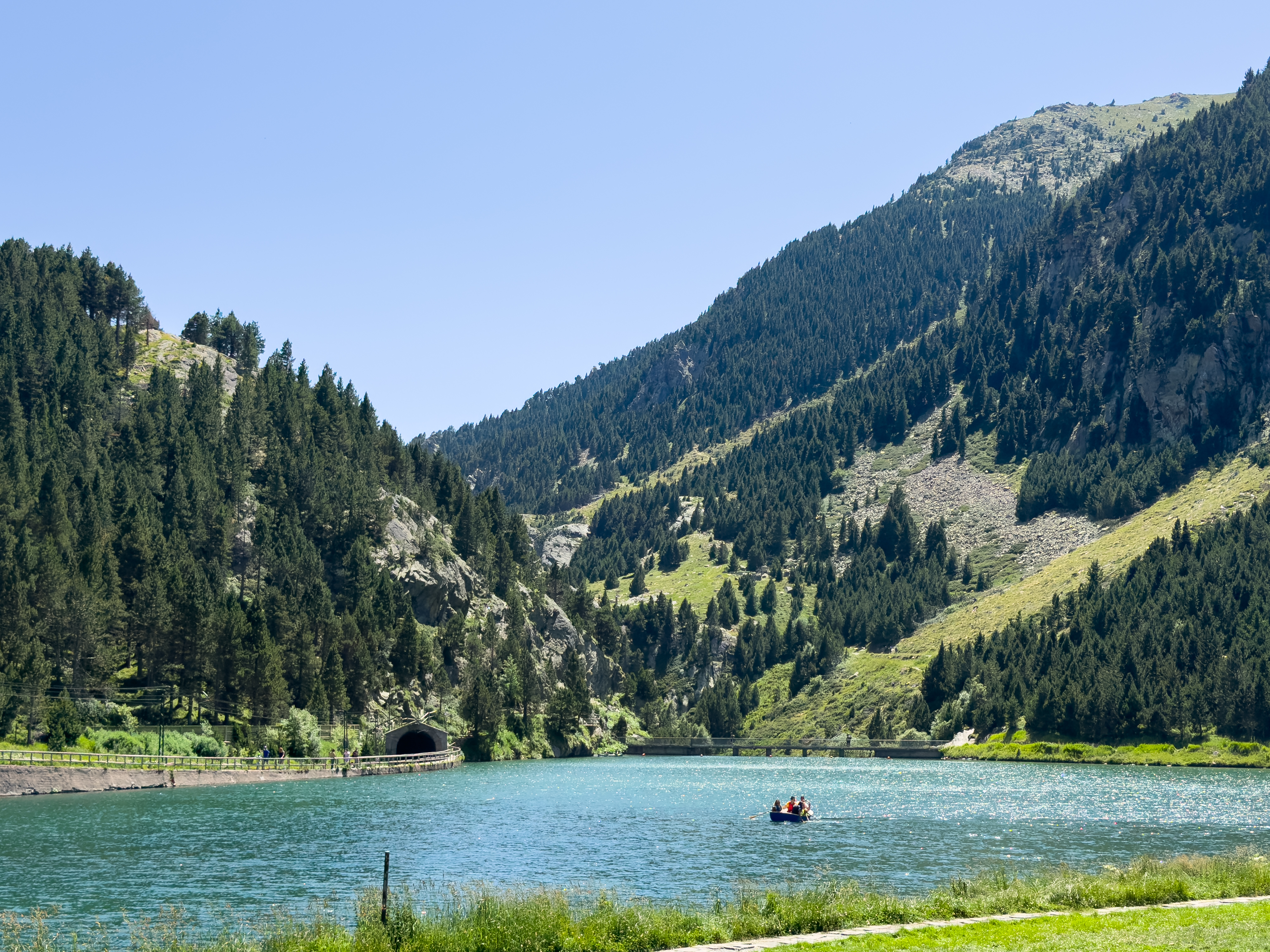
Santuari de la Mare de Déu de Núria

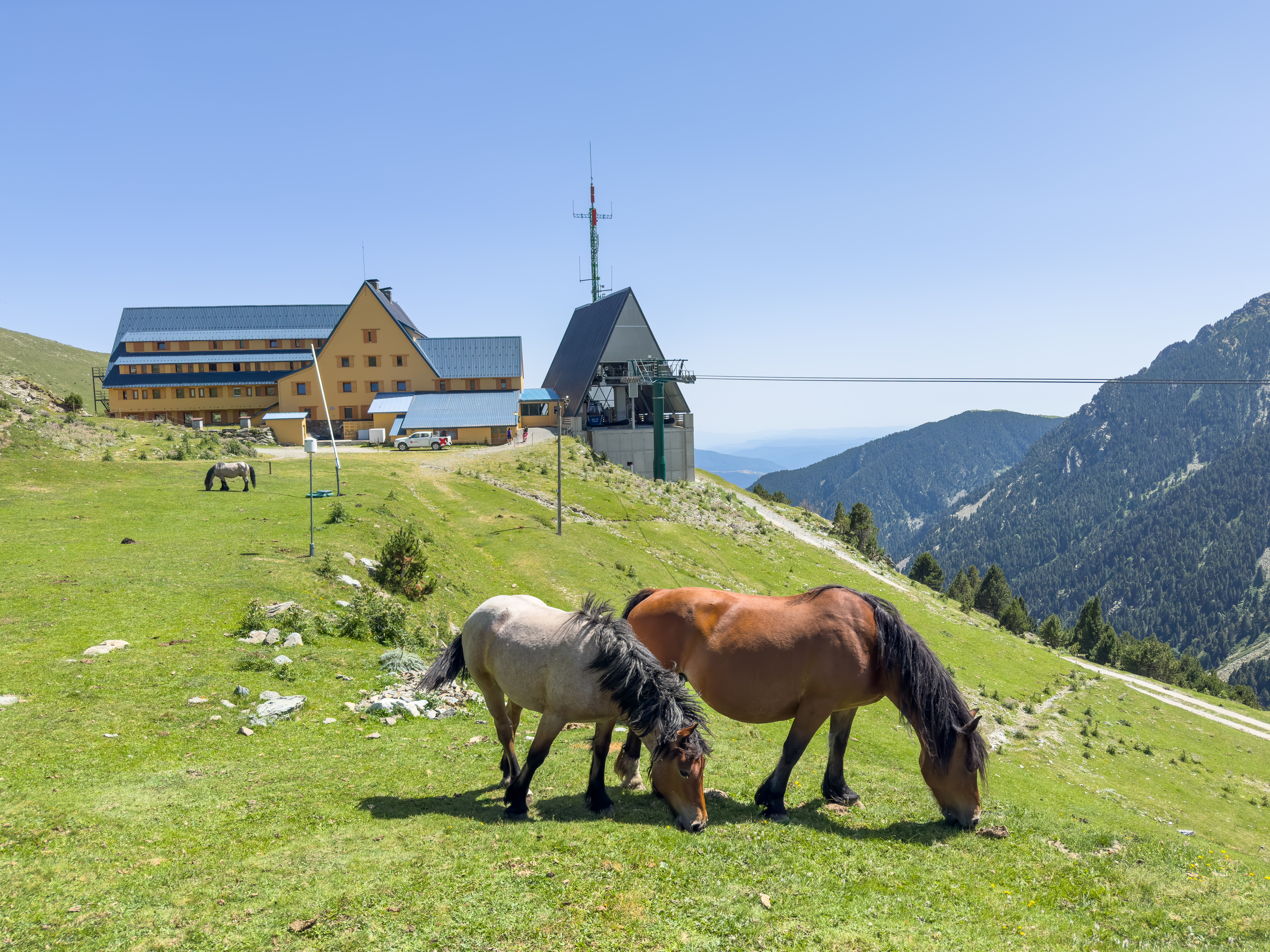
Alberg Pic de l'Àliga

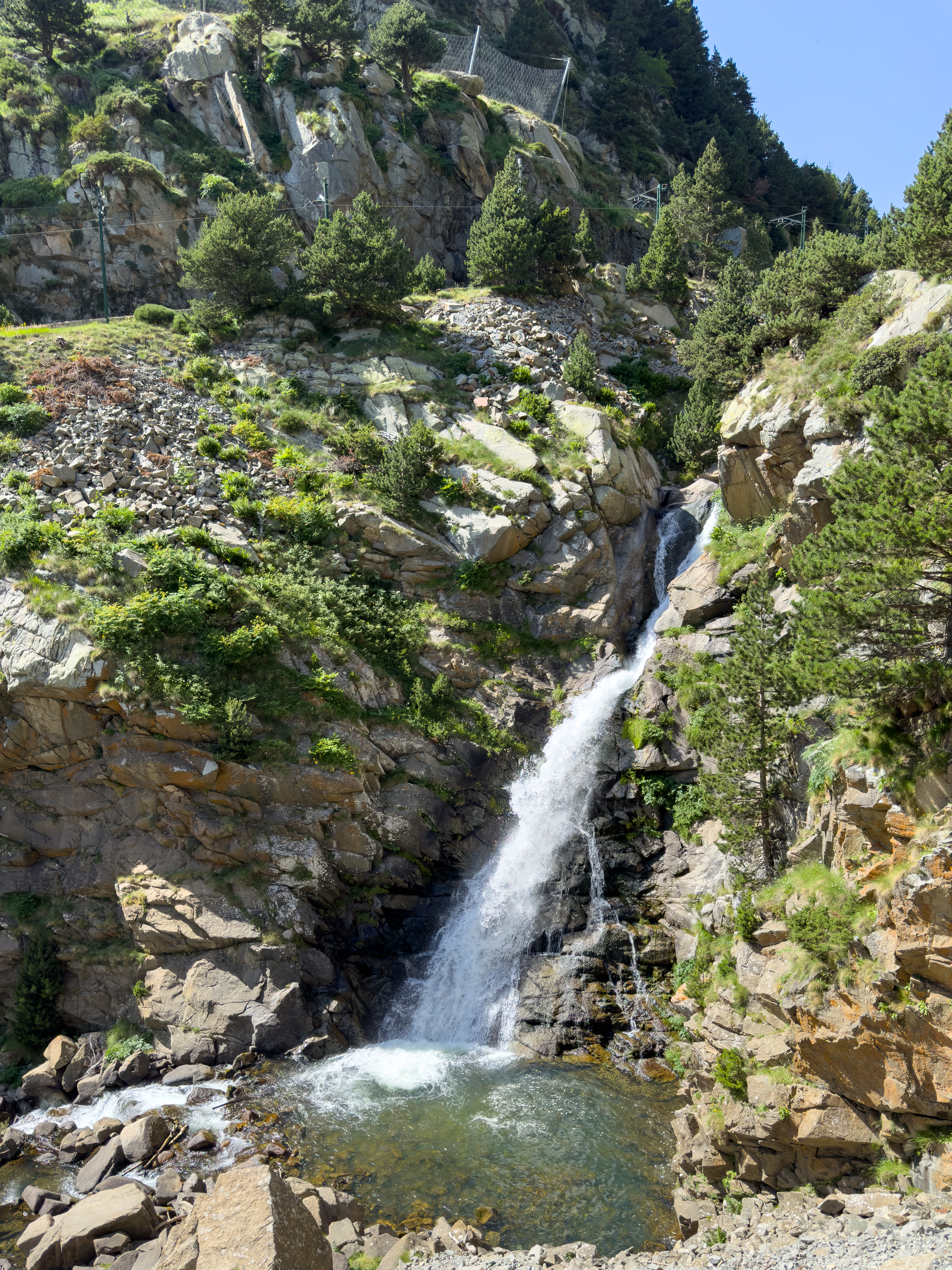
Waterfall

== See also ==
- Puigmal
- Bastiments
