= Núria López =

Spanish chemist and academic researcher

- Education: University of Barcelona (BSc, PhD)
- Scientific career
- Workplaces: Technical University of Denmark; Institute of Chemical Research of Catalonia
- Thesis: Models teòrics per a l'estudi dels metalls suportats (1999)

Núria López is a Spanish chemist who is Professor of Chemistry at the Institute of Chemical Research of Catalonia (ICIQ). She was awarded the Spanish Royal Society of Chemistry Prize for Excellence in 2015.

== Early life and education ==
López studied chemistry at the University of Barcelona. She completed both her bachelor's and doctoral degrees there, earning a PhD in theoretical chemistry in 1999. López joined the Technical University of Denmark (DTU) Center for Atomic-scale Materials Physics, where she worked in the laboratory of Jens Nørskov.

== Research and career ==
In 2001 López returned to Barcelona and became a Ramón y Cajal fellow at the University of Barcelona. She established her own research group in the Institute of Chemical Research of Catalonia (ICIQ) in 2005, which studies photo-electro-catalysis. Her research makes use of atomistic simulations using the Barcelona Supercomputing Center to understand the fundamental mechanisms that underpin heterogeneous catalysis. She looks to design more efficient, selective and sustainable materials for heterogeneous catalysis, with a focus in improving selectivity and gold catalysis. In 2015 she was awarded the Spanish Royal Society of Chemistry Prize for Excellence in 2015. She used heterogeneous catalysis to develop new materials for artificial sweeteners, using renewable and low-cost products such as arabinose. She showed that it is possible to rearrange sugar atoms using a molybdenum catalyst and a ruthenium catalysed hydrogenation step.

López has performed computational studies to determine the materials and experimental conditions that can improve the efficiency of water electrolysers; devices used for water splitting. In these electrolysers the oxidation of water takes place close to the anode, which conventionally presents a bottleneck to device operation. At this electrode, two oxygen atoms come together to form oxygen gas, which requires a precise alignment of electron spins. By placing a magnet (nickel zinc ferrite) close to the anode, her group were able to show that the evolution of oxygen, and the associated production of hydrogen, could be achieved at low potentials, saving considerable amounts of energy. It is understood that this occurs because the magnetic layer acts to align electron spins close to the anode, which controls the spin state of the electrons in oxygen, ensuring that the spins are correctly aligned for the formation of an oxygen-oxygen bond. For the reaction she used earth-abundant catalysts, including nickel and iron. The magnet required to double hydrogen output cost less than $10.

== Selected publications ==
- López, Núria (2004-04-01). "On the origin of the catalytic activity of gold nanoparticles for low-temperature CO oxidation". Journal of Catalysis. 223: 232–235. doi:10.1016/j.jcat.2004.01.001.
- López, Núria (2002-09-25). "Catalytic CO oxidation by a gold nanoparticle: A density functional study". Journal of the American Chemical Society. 124 (38): 11262–11263. Bibcode:2002JAChS.12411262L. doi:10.1021/ja026998a. PMID 12236728.
- López, Núria (2004-07-01). "The adhesion and shape of nanosized Au particles in a Au/TiO_{2} catalyst". Journal of Catalysis. 225: 86–94. doi:10.1016/j.jcat.2004.03.036.
