= Virgin of Nuria =

Image of Mary in the Valley of Nuria, Spain

Coordinates: 42.3970°N 2.1536°E

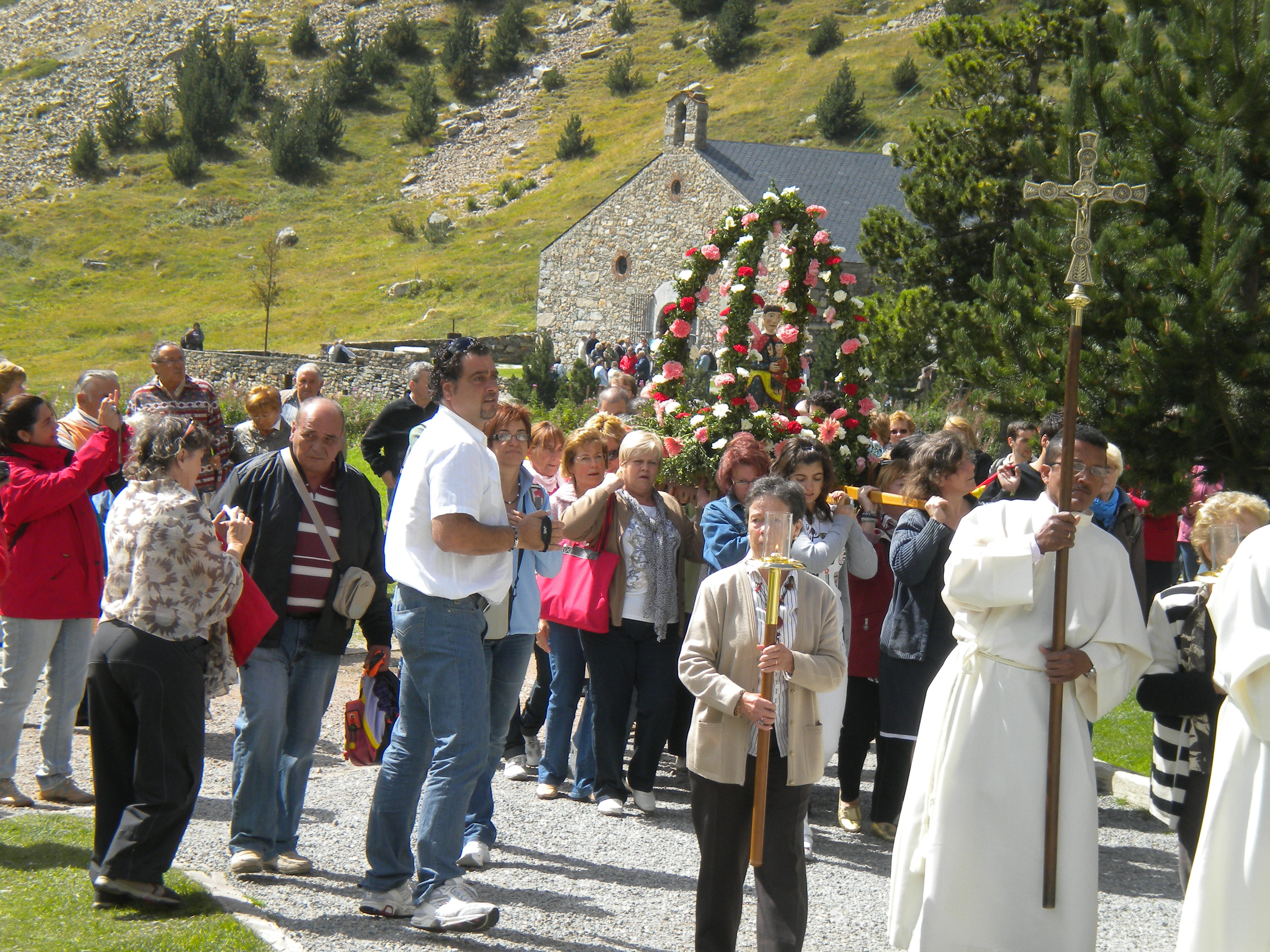
Procession of the Mare de Déu de Núria

The Virgin of Nuria (Catalan Mare de Déu de Núria) is a popular Roman Catholic shrine in the Valley of Nuria. The Catalan girls' name Núria (Spanish: Nuria) derives from the shrine.

== Gallery ==
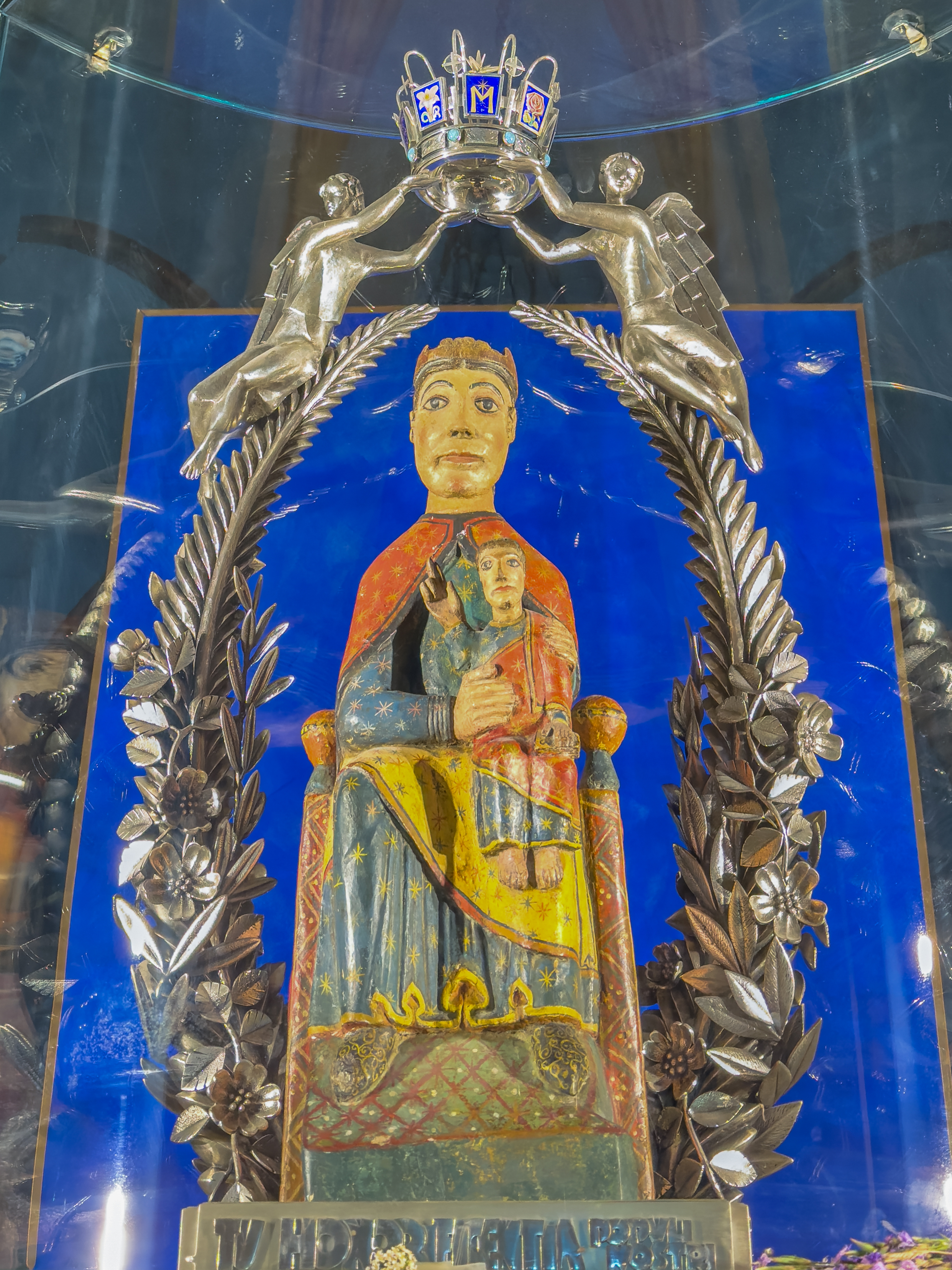

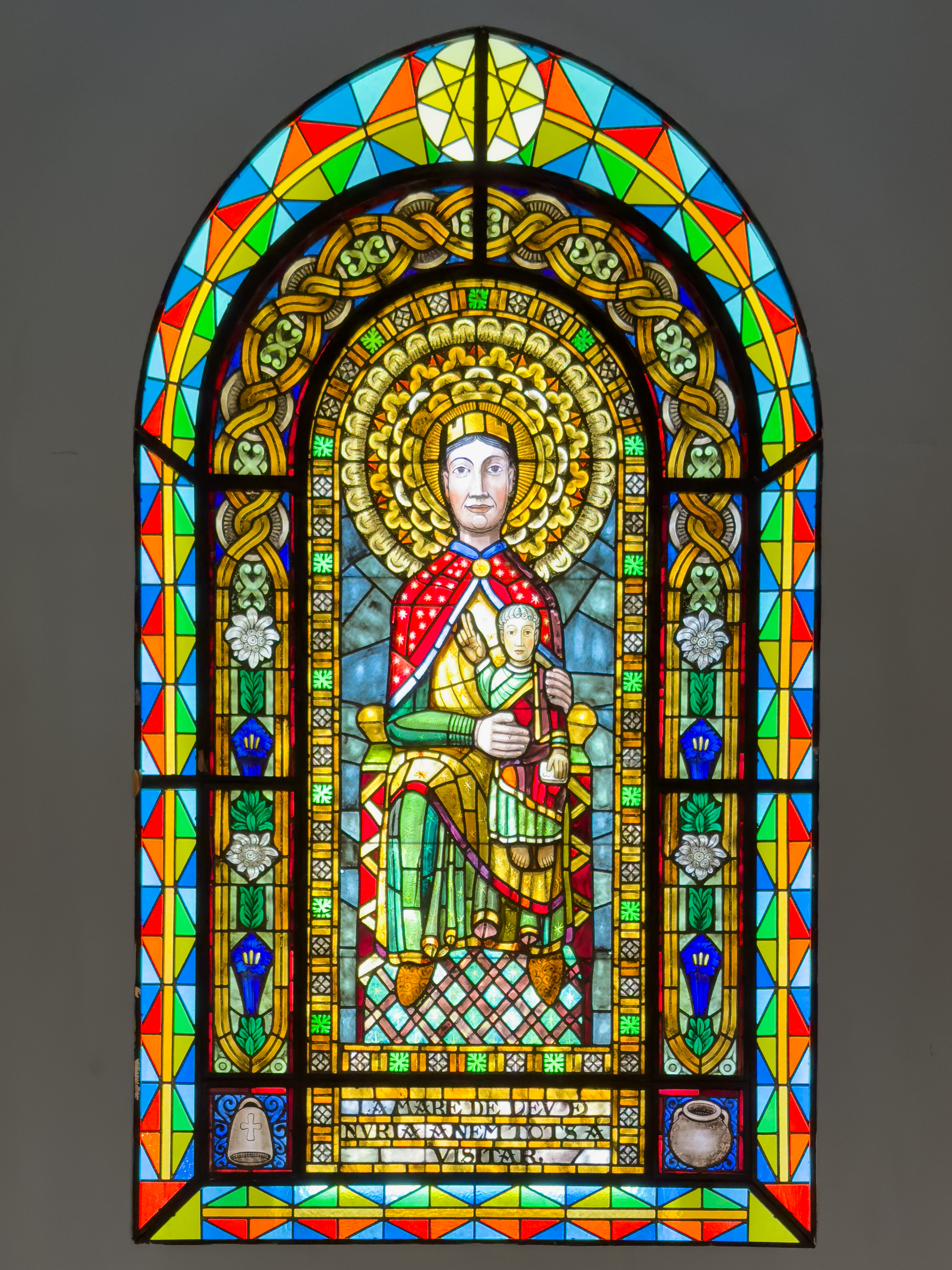

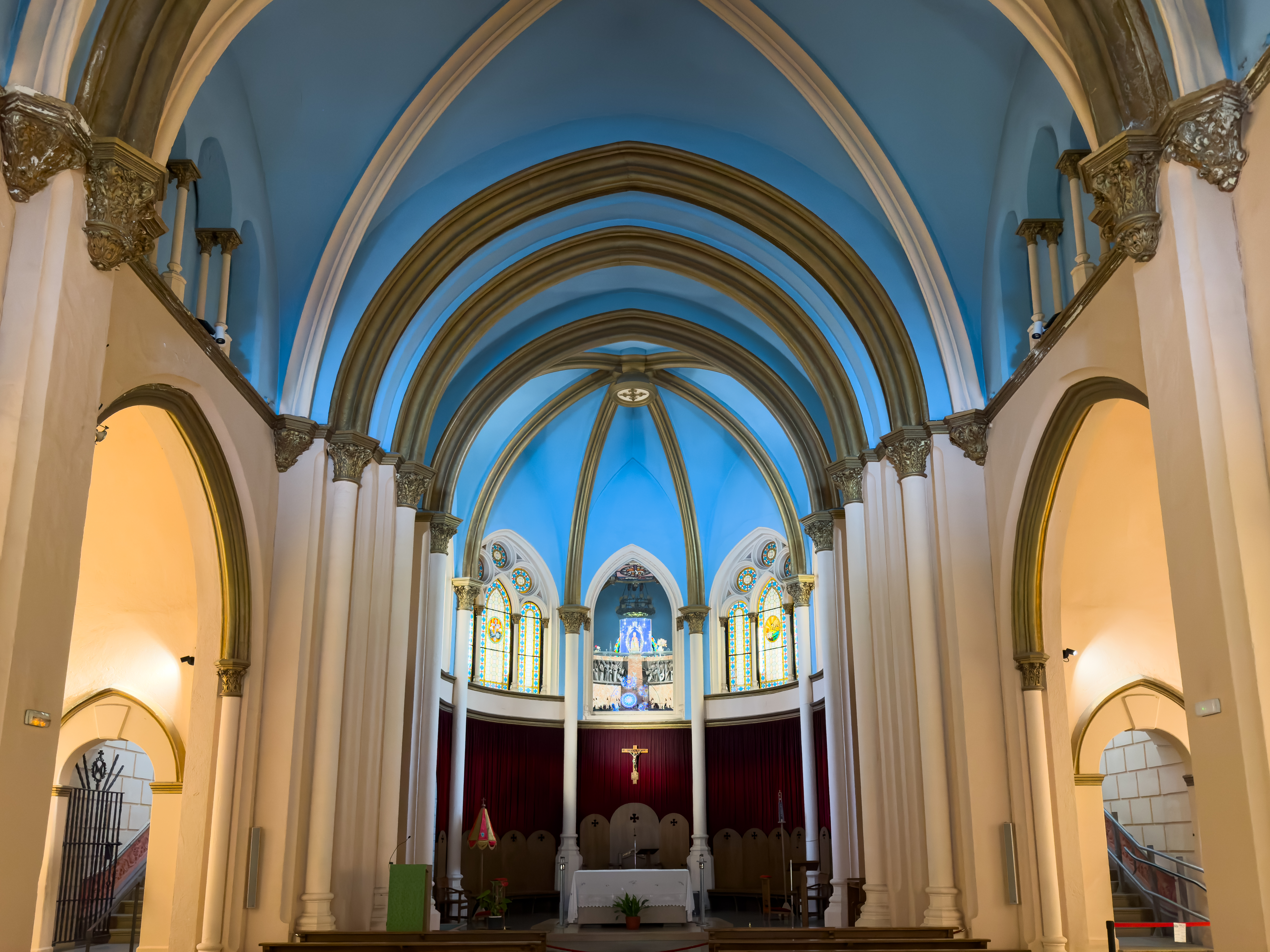

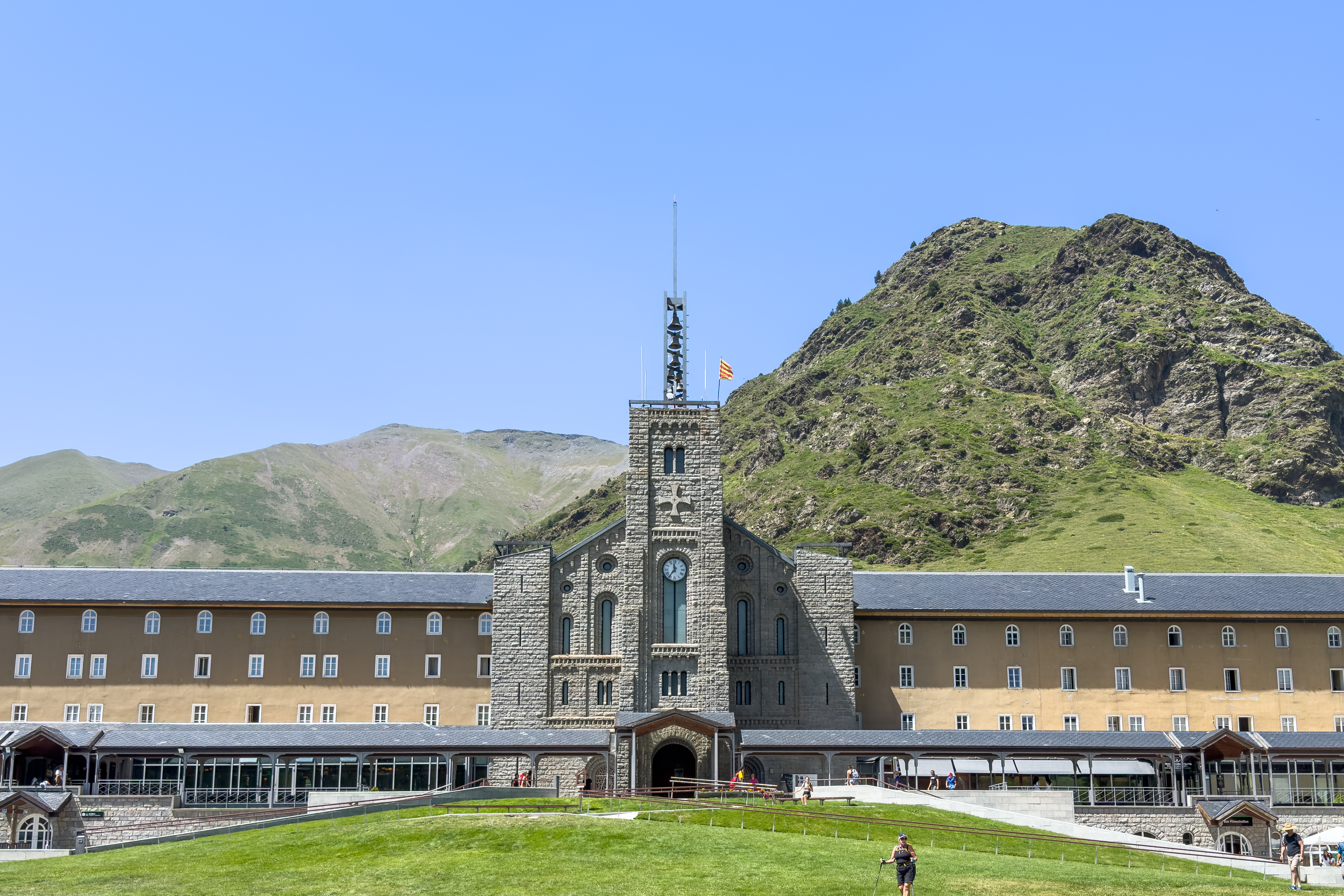

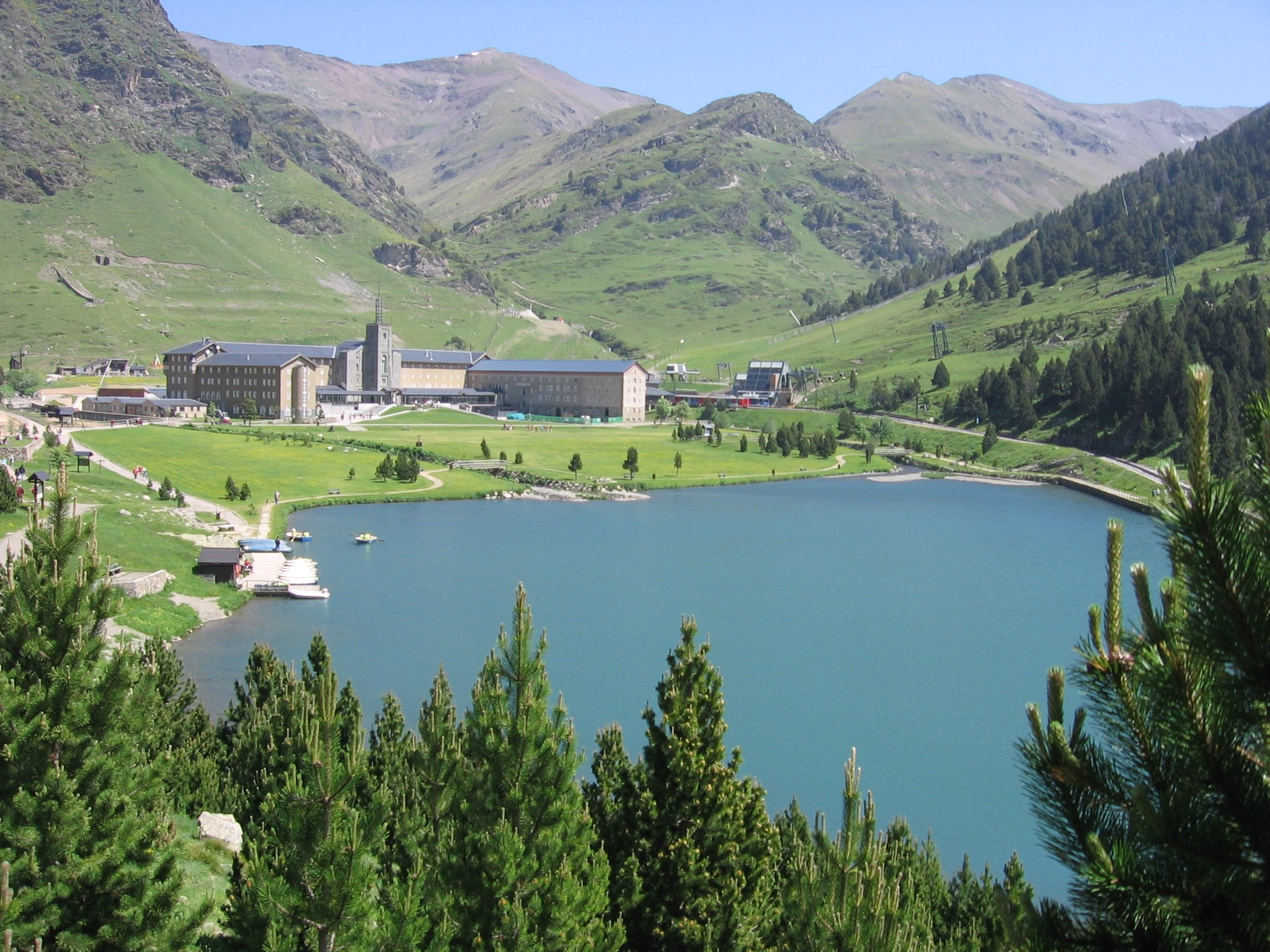
