= M. Cristina Alcalde =

Peruvian academic

Dr M. Cristina Alcalde
- Born: Peru
- Citizenship: United States
- Occupation: Professor

Academic background
- Education: Indiana University

Academic work
- Discipline: Anthropology, Women's and Gender Studies
- Sub-discipline: Latin American Studies
- Institutions: Miami University

M. Cristina Alcalde is professor of Global and Intercultural Studies at Miami University. Previously, she served as Marie Rich Endowed Professor of Women's and Gender Studies at the University of Kentucky, where she was also Associate Dean of Inclusion and Internationalization in the College of Arts and Sciences at the university. There, she was also an affiliate faculty member in the Social Theory, Latin American, Caribbean, and Latino Studies, and Anthropology departments and worked with the Center for Research on Violence Against Women. Her research focuses on exclusion, leadership, gender violence, migration, and race and racialization.

== Education ==
Alcalde earned her Masters of Arts (1999) and Ph.D. (2003) at Indiana University Bloomington in Latin American Studies and anthropology, respectively.

== Research ==
Alcalde researches exclusion, belonging, migration, and racialization, as well as the experiences of women of color particularly in leadership. She also has extensive experience with research on domestic violence, particularly in Peru, and on the "interconnections among intimate, institutional, and structural violence in Peru and among Latinos in the U.S., as well as on masculinities and motherhood". She finds that the responsibility of preventing domestic violence and protecting those who are being abused does not belong to any one person or institution, and it includes the police, the prosecutors office, ministries, courts, and the public.

== Bibliography ==
- 2022: #MeToo and Beyond: Perspectives on a Global Movement. Co-editor, with Paula-Irene Villa. University Press of Kentucky.
- 2022: Dismantling Institutional Whiteness: Emerging Forms of Leadership in Higher Education. Co-editor, with Mangala Subramaniam. Purdue University Press.
- 2022: Familia, exclusión y el racismo de la peruanidad: La tia Eliana. Fondo Editorial de la Pontificia Universidad Católica del Perú.
- 2018: Peruvian Lives across Borders: Power, Exclusion, and Home. University of Illinois Press.
- 2015: Provocations: A Transnational Reader in the History of Feminist Thought. Co-editor, with Susan Bordo and Ellen Rosenman. University of California Press.
- 2014: La mujer en la violencia: Género, pobreza, y resistencia en el Perú. Lima: Instituto de Estudios Peruanos and Fondo Editorial de la Pontificia Universidad Católica del Perú. (Spanish edition of The Woman in the Violence)
- 2010: The Woman in the Violence: Gender, Poverty, and Resistance in Peru. Nashville: Vanderbilt University Press.
- 2008: Visión del Perú de académicos peruanos en Estados Unidos (Vision of Peru of Peruvian Academics in the United States). Co-editor, with Joseph Zavala. Lima: Academia Diplomática del Perú.
