= Quo (magazine) =

Spanish magazine

- Editor-in-chief: Iván Carrillo Pérez (México)
- Director: Carlos Pedroza Luna (México); Jorge Alcalde (España) (2007)
- Categories: Science, technology, sex
- Frequency: Monthly
- Format: Magazine
- Total circulation: 130,000 (México); 157,000 (Spain)
- Founder: Science Scholars
- Founded: 1995; 31 years ago
- Company: Hearst Magazines
- Country: Spain, Mexico
- Language: Spanish
- Website: quo.es (Spain) web.archive.org/web/20150517004633/http://quo.mx:80/ (Mexico)

Quo is a monthly Spanish-language pop-science magazine that informs about science through thinking and entertainment. It contains articles pertaining to health, sex, ecology, technology, nutrition, psychology and human life. Its content has the capability to answer all the basic doubts a person might have about the world they live in. The magazine was created in Spain by the Hachette Filipacchi publisher. It was released in Spain in 1995. Its first director was Oscar Becerra and the art director was Pancho Guijarro. Aside from Becerra and Guijarro, Juan Caño, vice president editor of Hachette, was highly involved in the creative development of the publication. A few months later Grupo Zeta released CNR in Spain, a magazine whose similarities to Quo were extraordinary. Hearst Magazines bought Hachette Filipacchi's Spanish magazines in 2011.

In 1997 the Mexican edition was started, published by Editorial Televisa and directed by Gabriel Sama. The first art director for the Mexican edition was Julio Carrasco; Rodrigo Xoconostle and Soledad Aguirre were members of the original reading team. During its first years Quo had editions in the Czech Republic, Portugal and France aside from the Mexican version. The Mexican edition went from Editorial Televisa publisher to Grupo Expansión about five years after its first appearance in Mexico. The French edition was discontinued.

== Sections ==
The magazine is composed of six different sections in which articles of interest and science are reviewed. Below is a small description of each of the sections:

=== Quonectados ===
"Space at your entire disposal. Or almost"

The section of the magazine that contains answers to questions made by readers of Quo. Includes:

- Agenda for the month. A summary of a series of events about science, technology and gossip to occur over the month of the magazines publishment.
- Smart advice. On this section a group of experts from diverse cultural areas help the magazine by providing trustworthy and accurate information.
- Mail. Where the reader's main questions are published along with a concrete response.
- Expert opinions. Experts express their points of view to a specific topic.

=== Portfolio ===
Section of the magazine that contains interesting articles accompanied by high quality images and information with high levels of interest.

=== Prágmata ===
This section is the most broad and extensive on the publication. Prágmata is probably the section of most interest since it goes over common questions about the world using diverse areas of study and analytical thinking. The sections content is divided on the following areas.

- Entertainment
- Mind
- Human
- Nature
- Technology
- Automobiles
- Sex
- Sports
- Quality of life
- Art

=== Portada ===
Main section of the magazine since it covers the topic present on the cover of the magazine. An interesting section that contains exclusive information, high quality images and in occasions is accompanied by tables and graphs that complement the content on an efficient way.

=== Reportajes ===
Section that contains diverse topics pertaining to current events. This sections varies according to the articles considered on that months publication, still the information is considered entertaining by readers.

In February 2008 Quo published an article about Wikipedia in which 15 experts analyzed 30 articles from Spanish Wikipedia.

=== Qplus ===
"Our planet in motion."

It works as an information supplement, since it contains its own sections of interest. The sections included on Qplus are:

- Expediente. Where every month the magazine includes a historical article and relates it to the modern day.
- Atlas Quo. In which you can find geographic information fundamental to learn details about a specific place on the planet.
- Ágora. Biography about a special person chosen by its contribution on the diverse areas of study and knowledge.
- Actus. Interview with a modern day personality.
- Cine. A brief review about cinematographic adaptations of the moment.
- ¿Cómo funciona?. Detail examination and step by step operation of an object or specific situation.
- Libros y discos. A review of main books and audio compact disks for sell of that month.
- Columna. Where a scholar from an area of knowledge creates a topic that could result of interest to the reader.
