= Tati Alcalde =

Spanish footballer (born 1964)

Personal information
- Full name: Donato Alcalde Tieles
- Date of birth: 22 January 1964 (age 62)
- Place of birth: Salinas, Spain
- Height: 1.77 m (5 ft 10 in)
- Position: Defender

Senior career*
Years	Team	Apps	(Gls)
1980–1983	Ensidesa	66	(2)
1983–1986	Avilés	67+	(4+)
1986–1993	Sporting Gijón	160	(0)
1994	Landskrona BoIS	7	(0)
1995	Alavés	12	(0)
1996–1997	Beira-Mar	18	(0)
1997–1998	Avilés	30	(0)
Total		360	(6)
- * Club domestic league appearances and goals

Donato "Tati" Alcalde Tieles (born 22 January 1964) is a Spanish retired footballer who played as a defender.

== Career ==
After playing for Real Avilés CF in the Spanish third division, Alcalde signed for Sporting de Gijón in La Liga, staying for eight seasons before leaving due to injury.

In 1994, he played for Landskrona BoIS in Sweden through former teammate Joakim Nilsson, who already played for them and invited him after a telephone conversation.
