= Nuria Pomares =

Spanish dancer

- Born: Madrid, Spain

Nuria Pomares is a dancer. She was born in Madrid and studied Spanish and Classical ballet at the Royal High School of Dance. Her professional debut was at Lincoln Center in 1991. She has danced at the Teatro de la Zarzuela in Madrid and the Gran Teatre del Liceu in Barcelona.

== Career ==
She was a soloist with Jose Antonio y los Ballets Españoles for one year and danced with Joaquín Cortés in Pasión Gitana for 4 years. Since 2002, she has danced in the opera La vida breve by Manuel de Falla under the direction of Rafael Frühbeck de Burgos throughout the United States and Europe, including with the New York Philharmonic, the Boston Symphony Orchestra, the Los Angeles Philharmonic, the St. Petersburg Philharmonic Orchestra, and the Israel Philharmonic Orchestra. Nuria Pomares directs her own school of dance, which she founded in 1983.

She has danced in the Washington National Opera, Plácido Domingo (2009) in From my latin soul.

She was a special guest of the Israel Philharmonic Orchestra in the Annual Gala 75th season (2010) opera Carmen under the direction of Zubin Mehta.
