= Núria Aliaga-Alcalde =

Spanish chemist and academic

- Education: Indiana University Bloomington
- Scientific career
- Institutions: Leiden University; Catalan Institution for Research and Advanced Studies; Max Planck Institute for Chemical Energy Conversion
- Thesis: Synthesis and study of tetranuclear manganese single-molecule magnets (2003)

Núria Aliaga-Alcalde is a Spanish chemist who is a professor at the Catalan Institution for Research and Advanced Studies. Her research considers molecular magnets and functional nanomaterials.

== Early life and education ==
Aliaga-Alcalde completed her undergraduate studies at the University of Barcelona. She was a doctoral researcher at Indiana University Bloomington. Her research considered the synthesis of tetranuclear manganese single-molecule magnets. These polynuclear metal complexes can display unusual magnetic properties due to the large number of unpaired electrons. She was a postdoctoral researcher at both the Max Planck Institute for Chemical Energy Conversion and Leiden University.

== Research and career ==
In 2007, Aliaga-Alcalde joined the University of Barcelona, where she was made ICREA Researcher Professor at the Instituto de Ciencia de Materiales de Barcelona (ICMAB-CSIC). She established a research program focused on functional nanomaterials and the development of molecular magnets. She is particularly interested in curcumoids and porphyrinic-like coordination complexes.

== Awards and honours ==
- 2019 Salvador de Madariaga Fellowship

== Selected publications ==
- Wolfgang Wernsdorfer; Núria Aliaga-Alcalde; David N Hendrickson; George Christou (1 March 2002). "Exchange-biased quantum tunnelling in a supramolecular dimer of single-molecule magnets". Nature. 416 (6879): 406–409. doi:10.1038/416406A. ISSN 1476-4687. PMID 11919625. Wikidata Q40650114.
- Hill S; Rachel Sian Edwards; Aliaga-Alcalde N; Christou G (1 November 2003). "Quantum coherence in an exchange-coupled dimer of single-molecule magnets". Science. 302 (5647): 1015–1018. arXiv:cond-mat/0311209. doi:10.1126/SCIENCE.1090082. ISSN 0036-8075. PMID 14605362. Wikidata Q40550998.
- Silvia Gómez-Coca; Eduard Cremades; Núria Aliaga-Alcalde; Eliseo Ruiz (25 April 2013). "Mononuclear single-molecule magnets: tailoring the magnetic anisotropy of first-row transition-metal complexes". Journal of the American Chemical Society. 135 (18): 7010–7018. doi:10.1021/JA4015138. ISSN 0002-7863. PMID 23586965. Wikidata Q45035483.
