= Vallter 2000 =

Ski resort in Catalonia, Spain

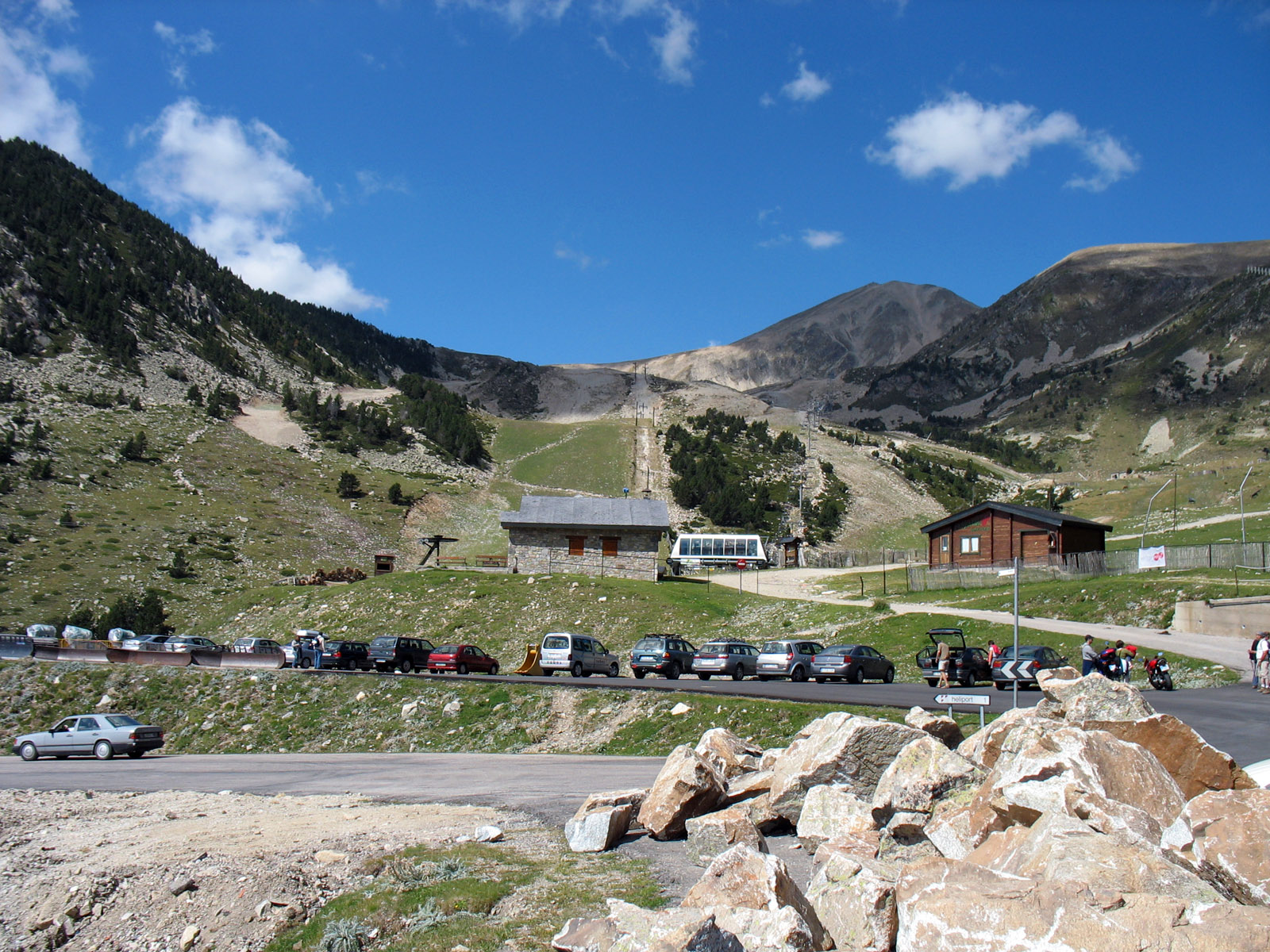
- Vallter 2000 ski resort

- Location within Spain Location within Catalonia Location within Pyrenees
- Nearest city: Setcases, Catalonia (Spain)
- Coordinates: 42°25′37″N 2°15′54″E
- Top elevation: 2,535 m (8,317 ft)
- Base elevation: 2,000 m (6,600 ft)
- Trails: Red: 6 Blue: 4 Green: 3; 13 Total (13,9 km)
- Longest run: 1,752
- Lift system: 11 Total (2 Chairlift, 5 Platter lift, 3 Carpets, 1 rope tow)
- Terrain parks: Snowpark, Freeride
- Website: www.vallter.cat/en/

Vallter 2000 is a ski resort located in the eastern Pyrenees close to Setcases, Girona, Catalonia (Spain). It is located near the river source of the Ter River, surrounded by Bastiments, Gra de Fajol and Pic de la Dona.

The ski area ranges between 2000 metres and 2535 metres in altitude, although the main buildings are located at an elevation of 2200 meters. Besides alpine skiing, the area is also popular for a range of off-mountain activities, including backcountry skiing, snowshoeing, ice climbing, and hiking.

== Cycling ==
Vallter 2000 is the highest road climb in Catalonia and has hosted several road bicycle racing stage finishes in the Volta a Catalunya due to its 12.2km climb at an average gradient of 7.8% from Setcases.

Stage winners at Volta a Catalunya
Year	Rider
1986	Juan Fernández Martín (ESP)
1992	Tony Rominger (SUI)
2013	Nairo Quintana (COL)
2014	Tejay Van Garderen (USA)
2019	Adam Yates (GBR)
2021	Adam Yates (GBR)
2023	Giulio Ciccone (ITA)
2024	Tadej Pogačar (SLO)

== See also ==
- Bastiments
- Gra de Fajol
- Gra de Fajol Petit
- Pic de la Dona
