= 2018 Volta a Catalunya =

Cycling race

2018 UCI World Tour, race 9 of 37

Race details
- Dates: 19–25 March 2018
- Stages: 7
- Distance: 1,136.6 km (706.3 mi)
- Winning time: 28h 25' 07"

Results
Jersey awarded to the overall winner	Winner	Alejandro Valverde (ESP)	(Movistar Team)
	Second	Nairo Quintana (COL)	(Movistar Team)
	Third	Pierre Latour (FRA)	(AG2R La Mondiale)
Jersey awarded to the mountains classification winner	Mountains	Alejandro Valverde (ESP)	(Movistar Team)
Jersey awarded to the youth classification winner	Youth	Pierre Latour (FRA)	(AG2R La Mondiale)
Jersey awarded to the sprints classification winner	Sprints	Lluís Mas (ESP)	(Caja Rural–Seguros RGA)
	Team	Movistar Team	

The 2018 Volta a Catalunya was a road cycling stage race that took place between 19 and 25 March 2018 in Spain. It was the 98th edition of the Volta a Catalunya and the ninth event of the 2018 UCI World Tour.

For the second year in a row, and for the third time in his career, the race was won by Movistar Team rider Alejandro Valverde. Valverde won the second and fourth stages during the race, taking the race lead – and the mountains jersey as well – for good after his second stage victory. He finished 29 seconds clear of his nearest rival, team-mate Nairo Quintana, after Quintana's Colombian compatriot Egan Bernal (Team Sky) crashed out of the race on the final day. The podium was completed by AG2R La Mondiale's Pierre Latour, a further 18 seconds in arrears of Quintana; Bernal's withdrawal also allowed Latour to claim the young rider classification. The other jersey on offer for the sprints classification was claimed by Lluís Mas (Caja Rural–Seguros RGA), while the Movistar Team won the teams classification, after placing a third rider – Marc Soler – in the top-five overall.

Before the start of the last stage, the women's reVolta was organised for the first time.

== Teams ==
As the Volta a Catalunya was a UCI World Tour event, all eighteen UCI WorldTeams were invited automatically and obliged to enter a team in the race. Seven UCI Professional Continental teams competed, completing the 25-team peloton. Two of the Professional Continental teams, Burgos BH and Euskadi–Murias, made their début at UCI World Tour level.

UCI WorldTeams

- AG2R La Mondiale
- Astana
- Bahrain–Merida
- BMC Racing Team
- Bora–Hansgrohe
- EF Education First–Drapac p/b Cannondale
- Team Dimension Data
- Team Katusha–Alpecin
- LottoNL–Jumbo
- Lotto–Soudal
- Movistar Team
- Mitchelton–Scott
- Quick-Step Floors
- Team Sky
- Team Sunweb
- Trek–Segafredo
- UAE Team Emirates
- Groupama–FDJ

UCI Professional Continental teams

- Burgos BH
- Caja Rural–Seguros RGA
- Cofidis
- Euskadi–Murias
- Fortuneo–Samsic
- Israel Cycling Academy
- Team Manzana Postobón

== Route ==
The full route of the 2018 Volta a Catalunya was announced on 12 March 2018.

The third stage, initially due to be held over 199.2 km (124 mi) between Sant Cugat del Vallès and Vallter 2000–Setcases, was shortened due to the threat of poor weather conditions. As a result, the stage was shortened to 153.2 km (95 mi), and the stage finish was moved to Camprodon. The sixth stage, initially due to be held over 194.2 km (121 mi) between Vielha–Val d'Aran and Torrefarrera, was shortened due to heavy snow in the start location. As a result, the stage was shortened to 117 km (73 mi), and the stage start was moved to La Pobla de Segur.

Stage schedule
Stage	Date	Route	Distance	Type	Winner
1	19 March	Calella to Calella	152.3 km (95 mi)	Medium-mountain stage	Álvaro Hodeg (COL)
2	20 March	Mataró to Valls	175.6 km (109 mi)	Medium-mountain stage	Alejandro Valverde (ESP)
3	21 March	Sant Cugat del Vallès to Camprodon	153.2 km (95 mi) (Note: Stage reduced from 199.2 km (124 mi) due to the threat of poor weather conditions.)	Mountain stage	Thomas De Gendt (BEL)
4	22 March	Llanars to La Molina	170.8 km (106 mi)	Mountain stage	Alejandro Valverde (ESP)
5	23 March	Llívia to Vielha–Val d'Aran	212.9 km (132 mi)	Medium-mountain stage	Jarlinson Pantano (COL)
6	24 March	La Pobla de Segur to Torrefarrera	117 km (73 mi) (Note: Stage reduced from 194.2 km (121 mi) due to heavy snow.)	Hilly stage	Maximilian Schachmann (GER)
7	25 March	Barcelona to Barcelona	154.8 km (96 mi)	Hilly stage	Simon Yates (GBR)

== Stages ==
=== Stage 1 ===
19 March 2018 — Calella to Calella, 152.3 km (95 mi)

Result of Stage 1
Rank	Rider	Team	Time
1	Álvaro Hodeg (COL)	Quick-Step Floors	3h 39' 31"
2	Sam Bennett (IRL)	Bora–Hansgrohe	+ 0"
3	Jay McCarthy (AUS)	Bora–Hansgrohe	+ 0"
4	Michael Mørkøv (DEN)	Quick-Step Floors	+ 0"
5	Roberto Ferrari (ITA)	UAE Team Emirates	+ 0"
6	Niccolò Bonifazio (ITA)	Bahrain–Merida	+ 0"
7	Nacer Bouhanni (FRA)	Cofidis	+ 0"
8	Alejandro Valverde (ESP)	Movistar Team	+ 0"
9	Matej Mohorič (SLO)	Bahrain–Merida	+ 0"
10	Zak Dempster (AUS)	Israel Cycling Academy	+ 0"

General classification after Stage 1
Rank	Rider	Team	Time
1	Álvaro Hodeg (COL)	Quick-Step Floors	3h 39' 21"
2	Sam Bennett (IRL)	Bora–Hansgrohe	+ 4"
3	Andriy Hrivko (UKR)	Astana	+ 5"
4	Jay McCarthy (AUS)	Bora–Hansgrohe	+ 6"
5	Michael Mørkøv (DEN)	Quick-Step Floors	+ 10"
6	Roberto Ferrari (ITA)	UAE Team Emirates	+ 10"
7	Niccolò Bonifazio (ITA)	Bahrain–Merida	+ 10"
8	Nacer Bouhanni (FRA)	Cofidis	+ 10"
9	Alejandro Valverde (ESP)	Movistar Team	+ 10"
10	Matej Mohorič (SLO)	Bahrain–Merida	+ 10"

=== Stage 2 ===
20 March 2018 — Mataró to Valls, 175.6 km (109 mi)

Result of Stage 2
Rank	Rider	Team	Time
1	Alejandro Valverde (ESP)	Movistar Team	4h 41' 50"
2	Daryl Impey (RSA)	Mitchelton–Scott	+ 0"
3	Jay McCarthy (AUS)	Bora–Hansgrohe	+ 0"
4	Egan Bernal (COL)	Team Sky	+ 0"
5	Matej Mohorič (SLO)	Bahrain–Merida	+ 0"
6	Enrico Gasparotto (ITA)	Bahrain–Merida	+ 0"
7	José Joaquín Rojas (ESP)	Movistar Team	+ 0"
8	Tao Geoghegan Hart (GBR)	Team Sky	+ 0"
9	Toms Skujiņš (LAT)	Trek–Segafredo	+ 0"
10	Alex Howes (USA)	EF Education First–Drapac p/b Cannondale	+ 0"

General classification after Stage 2
Rank	Rider	Team	Time
1	Alejandro Valverde (ESP)	Movistar Team	8h 21' 09"
2	Jay McCarthy (AUS)	Bora–Hansgrohe	+ 4"
3	Daryl Impey (RSA)	Mitchelton–Scott	+ 6"
4	Nairo Quintana (COL)	Movistar Team	+ 11"
5	Matej Mohorič (SLO)	Bahrain–Merida	+ 12"
6	Bob Jungels (LUX)	Quick-Step Floors	+ 12"
7	Eduard Prades (ESP)	Euskadi–Murias	+ 12"
8	Enrico Gasparotto (ITA)	Bahrain–Merida	+ 12"
9	Jordi Simón (ESP)	Burgos BH	+ 12"
10	Egan Bernal (COL)	Team Sky	+ 12"

=== Stage 3 ===
21 March 2018 — Sant Cugat del Vallès to Camprodon, 153.2 km (95 mi)

Result of Stage 3
Rank	Rider	Team	Time
1	Thomas De Gendt (BEL)	Lotto–Soudal	4h 13' 48"
2	Simon Yates (GBR)	Mitchelton–Scott	+ 20"
3	Thibaut Pinot (FRA)	Groupama–FDJ	+ 20"
4	Mathias Frank (SUI)	AG2R La Mondiale	+ 20"
5	Nairo Quintana (COL)	Movistar Team	+ 20"
6	Giovanni Visconti (ITA)	Bahrain–Merida	+ 20"
7	Maximilian Schachmann (GER)	Quick-Step Floors	+ 20"
8	Egan Bernal (COL)	Team Sky	+ 20"
9	Matej Mohorič (SLO)	Bahrain–Merida	+ 20"
10	Bob Jungels (LUX)	Quick-Step Floors	+ 20"

General classification after Stage 3
Rank	Rider	Team	Time
1	Thomas De Gendt (BEL)	Lotto–Soudal	12h 34' 54"
2	Alejandro Valverde (ESP)	Movistar Team	+ 23"
3	Jay McCarthy (AUS)	Bora–Hansgrohe	+ 27"
4	Daryl Impey (RSA)	Mitchelton–Scott	+ 29"
5	Simon Yates (GBR)	Mitchelton–Scott	+ 29"
6	Thibaut Pinot (FRA)	Groupama–FDJ	+ 31"
7	Nairo Quintana (COL)	Movistar Team	+ 34"
8	Matej Mohorič (SLO)	Bahrain–Merida	+ 35"
9	Bob Jungels (LUX)	Quick-Step Floors	+ 35"
10	Eduard Prades (ESP)	Euskadi–Murias	+ 35"

=== Stage 4 ===
22 March 2018 — Llanars to La Molina, 170.8 km (106 mi)

Result of Stage 4
Rank	Rider	Team	Time
1	Alejandro Valverde (ESP)	Movistar Team	4h 25' 54"
2	Egan Bernal (COL)	Team Sky	+ 0"
3	Nairo Quintana (COL)	Movistar Team	+ 6"
4	Pierre Latour (FRA)	AG2R La Mondiale	+ 23"
5	Thibaut Pinot (FRA)	Groupama–FDJ	+ 53"
6	Marc Soler (ESP)	Movistar Team	+ 53"
7	Simon Yates (GBR)	Mitchelton–Scott	+ 53"
8	George Bennett (NZL)	LottoNL–Jumbo	+ 55"
9	Hugh Carthy (GBR)	EF Education First–Drapac p/b Cannondale	+ 59"
10	Daniel Martínez (COL)	EF Education First–Drapac p/b Cannondale	+ 1' 03"

General classification after Stage 4
Rank	Rider	Team	Time
1	Alejandro Valverde (ESP)	Movistar Team	17h 00' 58"
2	Egan Bernal (COL)	Team Sky	+ 19"
3	Nairo Quintana (COL)	Movistar Team	+ 26"
4	Pierre Latour (FRA)	AG2R La Mondiale	+ 48"
5	Simon Yates (GBR)	Mitchelton–Scott	+ 1' 12"
6	Thibaut Pinot (FRA)	Groupama–FDJ	+ 1' 14"
7	Marc Soler (ESP)	Movistar Team	+ 1' 18"
8	George Bennett (NZL)	LottoNL–Jumbo	+ 1' 20"
9	Hugh Carthy (GBR)	EF Education First–Drapac p/b Cannondale	+ 1' 24"
10	Steven Kruijswijk (NED)	LottoNL–Jumbo	+ 1' 28"

=== Stage 5 ===
23 March 2018 — Llívia to Vielha–Val d'Aran, 212.9 km (132 mi)

Result of Stage 5
Rank	Rider	Team	Time
1	Jarlinson Pantano (COL)	Trek–Segafredo	5h 20' 53"
2	Vegard Stake Laengen (NOR)	UAE Team Emirates	+ 0"
3	Matej Mohorič (SLO)	Bahrain–Merida	+ 10"
4	Giovanni Visconti (ITA)	Bahrain–Merida	+ 10"
5	Danilo Wyss (SUI)	BMC Racing Team	+ 10"
6	Sergey Chernetskiy (RUS)	Astana	+ 12"
7	José Joaquín Rojas (ESP)	Movistar Team	+ 14"
8	Alejandro Valverde (ESP)	Movistar Team	+ 14"
9	Dorian Godon (FRA)	Cofidis	+ 14"
10	Bjorg Lambrecht (BEL)	Lotto–Soudal	+ 14"

General classification after Stage 5
Rank	Rider	Team	Time
1	Alejandro Valverde (ESP)	Movistar Team	22h 22' 05"
2	Egan Bernal (COL)	Team Sky	+ 16"
3	Nairo Quintana (COL)	Movistar Team	+ 26"
4	Pierre Latour (FRA)	AG2R La Mondiale	+ 48"
5	Simon Yates (GBR)	Mitchelton–Scott	+ 1' 12"
6	Marc Soler (ESP)	Movistar Team	+ 1' 18"
7	George Bennett (NZL)	LottoNL–Jumbo	+ 1' 20"
8	Hugh Carthy (GBR)	EF Education First–Drapac p/b Cannondale	+ 1' 24"
9	Daniel Martínez (COL)	EF Education First–Drapac p/b Cannondale	+ 1' 26"
10	Jesper Hansen (DEN)	Astana	+ 1' 28"

=== Stage 6 ===
24 March 2018 — La Pobla de Segur to Torrefarrera, 117 km (73 mi)

Result of Stage 6
Rank	Rider	Team	Time
1	Maximilian Schachmann (GER)	Quick-Step Floors	2h 34' 25"
2	Diego Rubio (ESP)	Burgos BH	+ 0"
3	Sam Bennett (IRL)	Bora–Hansgrohe	+ 18"
4	Matej Mohorič (SLO)	Bahrain–Merida	+ 18"
5	Roberto Ferrari (ITA)	UAE Team Emirates	+ 18"
6	Enrique Sanz (ESP)	Euskadi–Murias	+ 18"
7	Egan Bernal (COL)	Team Sky	+ 18"
8	Danilo Wyss (SUI)	BMC Racing Team	+ 18"
9	José Joaquín Rojas (ESP)	Movistar Team	+ 18"
10	Benoît Jarrier (FRA)	Fortuneo–Samsic	+ 18"

General classification after Stage 6
Rank	Rider	Team	Time
1	Alejandro Valverde (ESP)	Movistar Team	24h 56' 48"
2	Egan Bernal (COL)	Team Sky	+ 16"
3	Nairo Quintana (COL)	Movistar Team	+ 26"
4	Pierre Latour (FRA)	AG2R La Mondiale	+ 48"
5	Simon Yates (GBR)	Mitchelton–Scott	+ 1' 12"
6	Marc Soler (ESP)	Movistar Team	+ 1' 18"
7	George Bennett (NZL)	LottoNL–Jumbo	+ 1' 20"
8	Hugh Carthy (GBR)	EF Education First–Drapac p/b Cannondale	+ 1' 24"
9	Daniel Martínez (COL)	EF Education First–Drapac p/b Cannondale	+ 1' 26"
10	Jesper Hansen (DEN)	Astana	+ 1' 28"

=== Stage 7 ===
25 March 2018 — Barcelona to Barcelona, 154.8 km (96 mi)

Result of Stage 7
Rank	Rider	Team	Time
1	Simon Yates (GBR)	Mitchelton–Scott	3h 28' 04"
2	Marc Soler (ESP)	Movistar Team	+ 13"
3	Pierre Latour (FRA)	AG2R La Mondiale	+ 18"
4	Jarlinson Pantano (COL)	Trek–Segafredo	+ 18"
5	Jay McCarthy (AUS)	Bora–Hansgrohe	+ 18"
6	Matej Mohorič (SLO)	Bahrain–Merida	+ 18"
7	Steven Kruijswijk (NED)	LottoNL–Jumbo	+ 18"
8	Warren Barguil (FRA)	Fortuneo–Samsic	+ 18"
9	Alejandro Valverde (ESP)	Movistar Team	+ 18"
10	George Bennett (NZL)	LottoNL–Jumbo	+ 18"

Final general classification
Rank	Rider	Team	Time
1	Alejandro Valverde (ESP)	Movistar Team	28h 25' 07"
2	Nairo Quintana (COL)	Movistar Team	+ 29"
3	Pierre Latour (FRA)	AG2R La Mondiale	+ 47"
4	Simon Yates (GBR)	Mitchelton–Scott	+ 47"
5	Marc Soler (ESP)	Movistar Team	+ 1' 10"
6	George Bennett (NZL)	LottoNL–Jumbo	+ 1' 23"
7	Daniel Martínez (COL)	EF Education First–Drapac p/b Cannondale	+ 1' 29"
8	Steven Kruijswijk (NED)	LottoNL–Jumbo	+ 1' 31"
9	Jesper Hansen (DEN)	Astana	+ 1' 31"
10	Thibaut Pinot (FRA)	Groupama–FDJ	+ 1' 34"

== Classification leadership table ==
In the 2018 Volta a Catalunya, four different jerseys were awarded. The general classification was calculated by adding each cyclist's finishing times on each stage. Time bonuses were awarded to the first three finishers on all stages: the stage winner won a ten-second bonus, with six and four seconds for the second and third riders respectively. Bonus seconds were also awarded to the first three riders at intermediate sprints; three seconds for the winner of the sprint, two seconds for the rider in second and one second for the rider in third. The leader of the general classification received a white and green jersey. This classification was considered the most important of the 2018 Volta a Catalunya, and the winner of the classification was considered the winner of the race.

Points for the mountains classification
Position	1	2	3	4	5	6	7	8	9	10
Points for Special	26	20	16	14	12	10	8	6	4	2
Points for Category 1	10	8	6	4	2	1	0			
Points for Category 2	5	3	2	1	0					
Points for Category 3	3	2	1	0						

The second classification was the sprints classification, the leader of which was awarded a white and orange jersey. In the sprints classification, riders received points for finishing in the top three at intermediate sprint points during each stage. There was also a mountains classification, the leadership of which was marked by a white and red jersey. Points for this classification were won by the first riders to the top of each categorised climb, with more points available for the higher-categorised climbs. Double points were also scheduled to be awarded at the summit finishes at Vallter 2000–Setcases (special-category) and La Molina (first-category), however the Vallter 2000–Setcases finish was removed due to the threat of poor weather.

The fourth jersey represented the young rider classification, marked by a white and blue jersey. Only riders born after 1 January 1993 were eligible; the young rider best placed in the general classification was the leader of the young rider classification. There was also a classification for teams, in which the times of the best three cyclists per team on each stage were added together; the leading team at the end of the race was the team with the lowest total time.

Stage	Winner	General classification	Mountains classification	Sprints classification	Young rider classification	Teams classification
1	Álvaro Hodeg	Álvaro Hodeg	Wilmar Paredes	Tom Bohli	Álvaro Hodeg	Bora–Hansgrohe
2	Alejandro Valverde	Alejandro Valverde	Pierre Latour	Tom Bohli	Matej Mohorič	Bahrain–Merida
3	Thomas De Gendt	Thomas De Gendt	Thomas De Gendt	Lluís Mas	Matej Mohorič	Lotto–Soudal
4	Alejandro Valverde	Alejandro Valverde	Alejandro Valverde	Lluís Mas	Egan Bernal	Movistar Team
5	Jarlinson Pantano	Alejandro Valverde	Alejandro Valverde	Lluís Mas	Egan Bernal	Movistar Team
6	Maximilian Schachmann	Alejandro Valverde	Alejandro Valverde	Lluís Mas	Egan Bernal	Movistar Team
7	Simon Yates	Alejandro Valverde	Alejandro Valverde	Lluís Mas	Pierre Latour	Movistar Team
Final		Alejandro Valverde	Alejandro Valverde	Lluís Mas	Pierre Latour	Movistar Team
