= Ter (river) =

River in Catalonia, Spain

Coordinates: 42°25′40″N 2°15′24″E

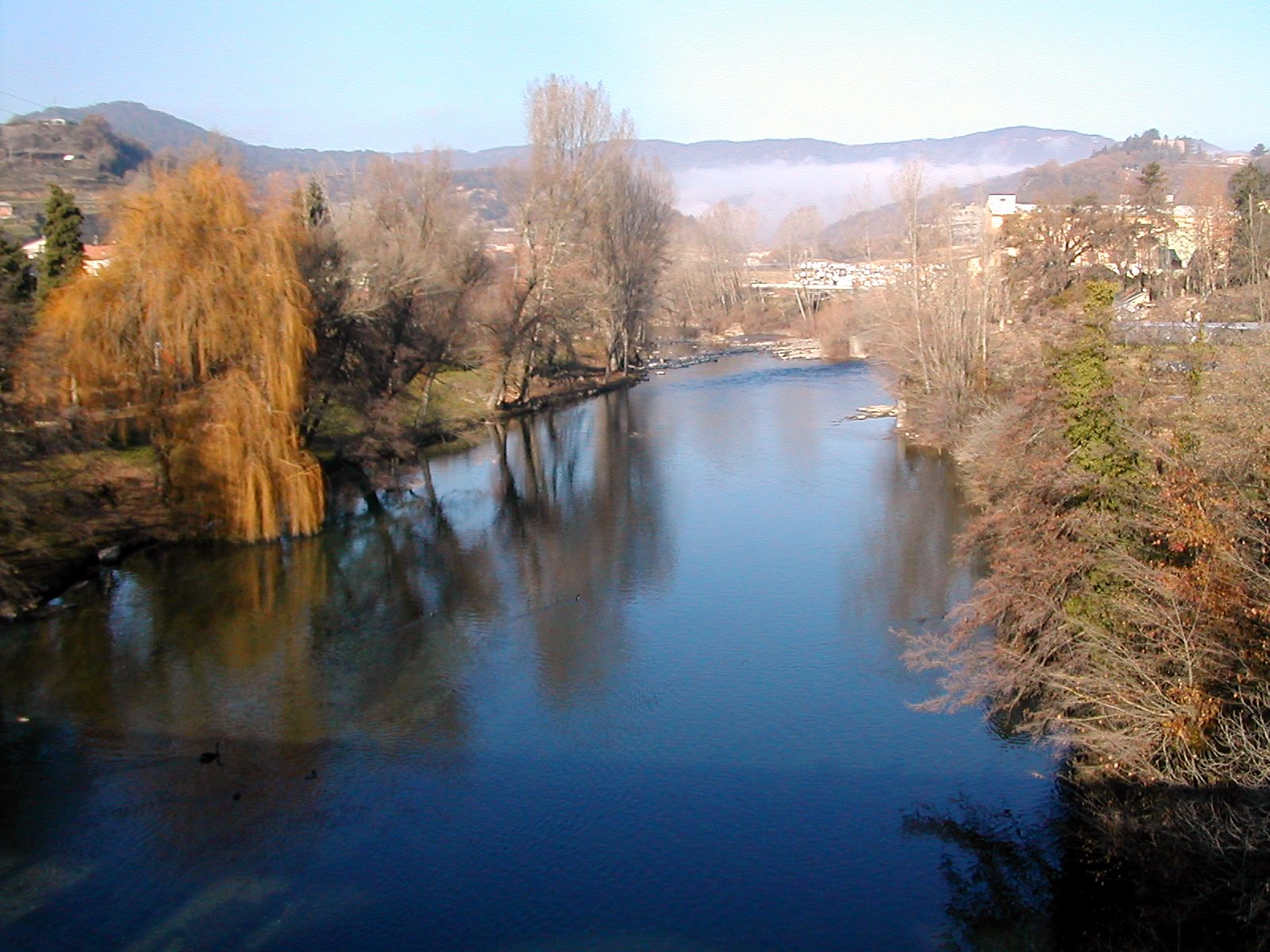
Ter River

The Ter (Catalan pronunciation: [ˈtɛɾ], Spanish: [ˈteɾ]) is a river in Catalonia, Spain. It rises in the Ulldeter, a glacial cirque in the East Pyrenees, at an approximate elevation of 2,400 metres (7,900 ft). At heights of around 3,000 metres (9,800 ft), the nearby peaks bordering the Ulldeter—the Bastiments, the Gra de Fajol, and the Pic de la Dona—supply its headwaters. The river runs through the comarques of Ripollès, Osona, Selva, Gironès, and Baix Empordà, discharging into the Mediterranean Sea at l'Estartit.

The Ter follows a course of 208 kilometres (129 mi) and drains an area of approximately 3,010 square kilometres (1,160 mi^{2}); its basin is described by a dendritic (branching, tree-like) and exorheic drainage pattern. Annually, an average of 840 cubic hectometres (680,000 acre⋅ft) of water is moved by the river, with an average flow rate of 25 cubic metres per second (880 cu ft/s) at its mouth. Although its headwaters are in the Pyrenees, the Ter receives significant inflow from rivers in the middle and lower plains. Thus it is susceptible to flooding in both the spring and the autumn.

== See also ==
- List of rivers of Spain
- Geology of the Pyrenees
