= 2014 Volta a Catalunya =

2014 UCI World Tour, race 5 of 28

Race details
- Dates: 24–30 March 2014
- Stages: 7
- Distance: 1,167.9 km (725.7 mi)
- Winning time: 29h 41' 34"

Results
| Jersey awarded to the overall winner | Winner | Joaquim Rodríguez (ESP) | (Team Katusha) |
| | Second | Alberto Contador (ESP) | (Tinkoff–Saxo) |
| | Third | Tejay van Garderen (USA) | (BMC Racing Team) |
| Jersey awarded to the mountains classification winner | Mountains | Stef Clement (NED) | (Belkin Pro Cycling) |
| Jersey awarded to the sprints classification winner | Sprints | Michel Koch (DEU) | (Cannondale) |
| | Team | Garmin–Sharp | |

The 2014 Volta a Catalunya was the 94th running of the Volta a Catalunya cycling stage race. It started on 24 March in Calella and ended on 30 March in Barcelona, and consisted of seven stages. It was the fifth race of the 2014 UCI World Tour season.

The race was won for the second time by Spain's Joaquim Rodríguez of Team Katusha, who took the lead after winning the race's third stage, and maintained the overall lead of the race until the end in Barcelona, to take his first stage race victory in over two years. Rodríguez won the general classification by four seconds over runner-up and compatriot Alberto Contador (Tinkoff–Saxo), while the BMC Racing Team's Tejay van Garderen completed the podium, three seconds behind Contador, and seven down on Rodríguez; van Garderen was the winner of the race's queen stage to Vallter 2000-Setcases on the fourth day.

In the race's other classifications, Stef Clement, of the Belkin Pro Cycling team, was the winner of the red jersey for the mountains classification; he also won a stage wearing the jersey, winning on the penultimate stage. Cannondale rider Michel Koch won both sprints classifications; along with the normal intermediate sprints, Koch was the winner of the special sprints standings, named in honour of Miguel Poblet, with the most points at the specific sprint places on the itinerary. For the second year in a row, Garmin–Sharp won the teams classification.

== Route ==
Stage characteristics and winners
| Stage | Date | Course | Distance | Type | Winner |
|---|---|---|---|---|---|
| 1 | 24 March | Calella to Calella | 169.7 km (105 mi) | Flat stage | Luka Mezgec (SLO) |
| 2 | 25 March | Mataró to Girona | 168 km (104 mi) | Flat stage | Luka Mezgec (SLO) |
| 3 | 26 March | Banyoles to La Molina | 162.9 km (101 mi) | Mountain stage | Joaquim Rodríguez (ESP) |
| 4 | 27 March | Alp to Vallter 2000-Setcases | 166.4 km (103 mi) | Mountain stage | Tejay van Garderen (USA) |
| 5 | 28 March | Llanars to Valls | 218.2 km (136 mi) | Intermediate stage | Luka Mezgec (SLO) |
| 6 | 29 March | El Vendrell to Vilanova i la Geltrú | 172 km (107 mi) | Flat stage | Stef Clement (NED) |
| 7 | 30 March | Barcelona to Barcelona | 120.7 km (75 mi) | Intermediate stage | Lieuwe Westra (NED) |

== Teams ==
As the Volta a Catalunya was a UCI World Tour event, all 18 UCI ProTeams were invited automatically and obligated to send a squad. Four other squads were given wildcard places, thus completing the 22-team peloton.

The 22 teams that competed in the race were:

- Ag2r–La Mondiale
- Astana
- Belkin Pro Cycling
- BMC Racing Team
- Caja Rural–Seguros RGA
- Cannondale
- CCC–Polsat–Polkowice
- Cofidis
- Team Europcar
- FDJ.fr
- Garmin–Sharp
- Giant–Shimano
- Team Katusha
- Lampre–Merida
- Lotto–Belisol
- Movistar Team
- Omega Pharma–Quick-Step
- Orica–GreenEDGE
- Team Sky
- Tinkoff–Saxo
- Trek Factory Racing
- Wanty–Groupe Gobert

== Stages ==
=== Stage 1 ===
24 March 2014 — Calella to Calella, 169.7 km (105.4 mi)

Stage 1 Result

| | Rider | Team | Time |
|---|---|---|---|
| 1 | Luka Mezgec (SLO) | Giant–Shimano | 4h 09' 13" |
| 2 | Leigh Howard (AUS) | Orica–GreenEDGE | s.t. |
| 3 | Julian Alaphilippe (FRA) | Omega Pharma–Quick-Step | s.t. |
| 4 | Paul Martens (GER) | Belkin Pro Cycling | s.t. |
| 5 | Tosh Van der Sande (BEL) | Lotto–Belisol | s.t. |
| 6 | Daniele Ratto (ITA) | Cannondale | s.t. |
| 7 | Marcus Burghardt (GER) | BMC Racing Team | s.t. |
| 8 | Roberto Ferrari (ITA) | Lampre–Merida | s.t. |
| 9 | Samuel Dumoulin (FRA) | Ag2r–La Mondiale | s.t. |
| 10 | Kévin Reza (FRA) | Team Europcar | s.t. |

General Classification after Stage 1

| | Rider | Team | Time |
|---|---|---|---|
| 1 | Luka Mezgec (SLO) | Giant–Shimano | 4h 09' 03" |
| 2 | Leigh Howard (AUS) | Orica–GreenEDGE | + 4" |
| 3 | Julian Alaphilippe (FRA) | Omega Pharma–Quick-Step | + 6" |
| 4 | Boris Vallée (BEL) | Lotto–Belisol | + 8" |
| 5 | Cédric Pineau (FRA) | FDJ.fr | + 9" |
| 6 | Paul Martens (GER) | Belkin Pro Cycling | + 10" |
| 7 | Tosh Van der Sande (BEL) | Lotto–Belisol | + 10" |
| 8 | Daniele Ratto (ITA) | Cannondale | + 10" |
| 9 | Marcus Burghardt (GER) | BMC Racing Team | + 10" |
| 10 | Roberto Ferrari (ITA) | Lampre–Merida | + 10" |

=== Stage 2 ===
25 March 2014 — Mataró to Girona, 168 km (104.4 mi)

Stage 2 Result

| | Rider | Team | Time |
|---|---|---|---|
| 1 | Luka Mezgec (SLO) | Giant–Shimano | 3h 57' 49" |
| 2 | Roberto Ferrari (ITA) | Lampre–Merida | s.t. |
| 3 | Daniele Ratto (ITA) | Cannondale | s.t. |
| 4 | Julian Alaphilippe (FRA) | Omega Pharma–Quick-Step | s.t. |
| 5 | Marcus Burghardt (GER) | BMC Racing Team | s.t. |
| 6 | Davide Viganò (ITA) | Caja Rural–Seguros RGA | s.t. |
| 7 | Boris Vallée (BEL) | Lotto–Belisol | s.t. |
| 8 | Tosh Van der Sande (BEL) | Lotto–Belisol | s.t. |
| 9 | Leigh Howard (AUS) | Orica–GreenEDGE | s.t. |
| 10 | Maciej Paterski (POL) | CCC–Polsat–Polkowice | + 3" |

General Classification after Stage 2

| | Rider | Team | Time |
|---|---|---|---|
| 1 | Luka Mezgec (SLO) | Giant–Shimano | 8h 06' 42" |
| 2 | Roberto Ferrari (ITA) | Lampre–Merida | + 14" |
| 3 | Leigh Howard (AUS) | Orica–GreenEDGE | + 14" |
| 4 | Julian Alaphilippe (FRA) | Omega Pharma–Quick-Step | + 16" |
| 5 | Daniele Ratto (ITA) | Cannondale | + 16" |
| 6 | Boris Vallée (BEL) | Lotto–Belisol | + 18" |
| 7 | Marcus Burghardt (GER) | BMC Racing Team | + 20" |
| 8 | Tosh Van der Sande (BEL) | Lotto–Belisol | + 20" |
| 9 | Davide Viganò (ITA) | Caja Rural–Seguros RGA | + 20" |
| 10 | Michel Koch (GER) | Cannondale | + 20" |

=== Stage 3 ===
26 March 2014 — Banyoles to La Molina, 162.9 km (101.2 mi)

Stage 3 Result

| | Rider | Team | Time |
|---|---|---|---|
| 1 | Joaquim Rodríguez (ESP) | Team Katusha | 4h 50' 55" |
| 2 | Alberto Contador (ESP) | Tinkoff–Saxo | + 5" |
| 3 | Nairo Quintana (COL) | Movistar Team | + 9" |
| 4 | Tejay van Garderen (USA) | BMC Racing Team | + 11" |
| 5 | Chris Froome (GBR) | Team Sky | + 13" |
| 6 | Domenico Pozzovivo (ITA) | Ag2r–La Mondiale | + 14" |
| 7 | Wilco Kelderman (NED) | Belkin Pro Cycling | + 14" |
| 8 | Andrew Talansky (USA) | Garmin–Sharp | + 14" |
| 9 | Romain Bardet (FRA) | Ag2r–La Mondiale | + 14" |
| 10 | Przemysław Niemiec (POL) | Lampre–Merida | + 20" |

General Classification after Stage 3

| | Rider | Team | Time |
|---|---|---|---|
| 1 | Joaquim Rodríguez (ESP) | Team Katusha | 12h 58' 00" |
| 2 | Alberto Contador (ESP) | Tinkoff–Saxo | + 5" |
| 3 | Nairo Quintana (COL) | Movistar Team | + 9" |
| 4 | Tejay van Garderen (USA) | BMC Racing Team | + 11" |
| 5 | Chris Froome (GBR) | Team Sky | + 13" |
| 6 | Wilco Kelderman (NED) | Belkin Pro Cycling | + 14" |
| 7 | Romain Bardet (FRA) | Ag2r–La Mondiale | + 14" |
| 8 | Andrew Talansky (USA) | Garmin–Sharp | + 14" |
| 9 | Domenico Pozzovivo (ITA) | Ag2r–La Mondiale | + 14" |
| 10 | Przemysław Niemiec (POL) | Lampre–Merida | + 20" |

=== Stage 4 ===
27 March 2014 — Alp to Vallter 2000-Setcases, 166.4 km (103.4 mi)

Stage 4 Result

| | Rider | Team | Time |
|---|---|---|---|
| 1 | Tejay van Garderen (USA) | BMC Racing Team | 4h 49' 30" |
| 2 | Romain Bardet (FRA) | Ag2r–La Mondiale | s.t. |
| 3 | Alberto Contador (ESP) | Tinkoff–Saxo | + 3" |
| 4 | Joaquim Rodríguez (ESP) | Team Katusha | + 4" |
| 5 | Nairo Quintana (COL) | Movistar Team | + 5" |
| 6 | Andrew Talansky (USA) | Garmin–Sharp | + 8" |
| 7 | Chris Froome (GBR) | Team Sky | + 8" |
| 8 | Warren Barguil (FRA) | Giant–Shimano | + 15" |
| 9 | Domenico Pozzovivo (ITA) | Ag2r–La Mondiale | + 16" |
| 10 | Robert Kišerlovski (CRO) | Trek Factory Racing | + 21" |

General Classification after Stage 4

| | Rider | Team | Time |
|---|---|---|---|
| 1 | Joaquim Rodríguez (ESP) | Team Katusha | 17h 47' 34" |
| 2 | Alberto Contador (ESP) | Tinkoff–Saxo | + 4" |
| 3 | Tejay van Garderen (USA) | BMC Racing Team | + 7" |
| 4 | Romain Bardet (FRA) | Ag2r–La Mondiale | + 10" |
| 5 | Nairo Quintana (COL) | Movistar Team | + 10" |
| 6 | Chris Froome (GBR) | Team Sky | + 17" |
| 7 | Andrew Talansky (USA) | Garmin–Sharp | + 18" |
| 8 | Domenico Pozzovivo (ITA) | Ag2r–La Mondiale | + 26" |
| 9 | Warren Barguil (FRA) | Giant–Shimano | + 42" |
| 10 | David Arroyo (ESP) | Caja Rural–Seguros RGA | + 45" |

=== Stage 5 ===
28 March 2014 — Llanars to Valls, 218.2 km (135.6 mi)

Stage 5 Result

| | Rider | Team | Time |
|---|---|---|---|
| 1 | Luka Mezgec (SLO) | Giant–Shimano | 5h 16' 00" |
| 2 | Julian Alaphilippe (FRA) | Omega Pharma–Quick-Step | s.t. |
| 3 | Samuel Dumoulin (FRA) | Ag2r–La Mondiale | s.t. |
| 4 | Paul Martens (GER) | Belkin Pro Cycling | s.t. |
| 5 | Michel Kreder (NED) | Wanty–Groupe Gobert | s.t. |
| 6 | Alberto Contador (ESP) | Tinkoff–Saxo | s.t. |
| 7 | Adam Yates (GBR) | Orica–GreenEDGE | s.t. |
| 8 | Kévin Reza (FRA) | Team Europcar | s.t. |
| 9 | Tosh Van der Sande (BEL) | Lotto–Belisol | s.t. |
| 10 | Davide Viganò (ITA) | Caja Rural–Seguros RGA | s.t. |

General Classification after Stage 5

| | Rider | Team | Time |
|---|---|---|---|
| 1 | Joaquim Rodríguez (ESP) | Team Katusha | 23h 03' 34" |
| 2 | Alberto Contador (ESP) | Tinkoff–Saxo | + 4" |
| 3 | Tejay van Garderen (USA) | BMC Racing Team | + 7" |
| 4 | Romain Bardet (FRA) | Ag2r–La Mondiale | + 10" |
| 5 | Nairo Quintana (COL) | Movistar Team | + 10" |
| 6 | Chris Froome (GBR) | Team Sky | + 17" |
| 7 | Andrew Talansky (USA) | Garmin–Sharp | + 18" |
| 8 | Domenico Pozzovivo (ITA) | Ag2r–La Mondiale | + 26" |
| 9 | Warren Barguil (FRA) | Giant–Shimano | + 42" |
| 10 | Robert Kišerlovski (CRO) | Trek Factory Racing | + 48" |

=== Stage 6 ===
29 March 2014 — El Vendrell to Vilanova i la Geltrú, 162 km (100.7 mi)

Stage 6 Result

| | Rider | Team | Time |
|---|---|---|---|
| 1 | Stef Clement (NED) | Belkin Pro Cycling | 3h 58' 44" |
| 2 | Rudy Molard (FRA) | Cofidis | + 3" |
| 3 | Pieter Serry (BEL) | Omega Pharma–Quick-Step | + 3" |
| 4 | Jens Voigt (GER) | Trek Factory Racing | + 3" |
| 5 | Marek Rutkiewicz (POL) | CCC–Polsat–Polkowice | + 3" |
| 6 | Antonio Piedra (ESP) | Caja Rural–Seguros RGA | + 3" |
| 7 | Pierre Rolland (FRA) | Team Europcar | + 3" |
| 8 | Damien Howson (AUS) | Orica–GreenEDGE | + 3" |
| 9 | Nico Sijmens (BEL) | Wanty–Groupe Gobert | + 9" |
| 10 | Tosh Van der Sande (BEL) | Lotto–Belisol | + 55" |

General Classification after Stage 6

| | Rider | Team | Time |
|---|---|---|---|
| 1 | Joaquim Rodríguez (ESP) | Team Katusha | 27h 03' 13" |
| 2 | Alberto Contador (ESP) | Tinkoff–Saxo | + 4" |
| 3 | Tejay van Garderen (USA) | BMC Racing Team | + 7" |
| 4 | Romain Bardet (FRA) | Ag2r–La Mondiale | + 10" |
| 5 | Nairo Quintana (COL) | Movistar Team | + 10" |
| 6 | Chris Froome (GBR) | Team Sky | + 17" |
| 7 | Andrew Talansky (USA) | Garmin–Sharp | + 18" |
| 8 | Domenico Pozzovivo (ITA) | Ag2r–La Mondiale | + 26" |
| 9 | Warren Barguil (FRA) | Giant–Shimano | + 42" |
| 10 | Robert Kišerlovski (CRO) | Trek Factory Racing | + 48" |

=== Stage 7 ===
30 March 2014 — Barcelona to Barcelona, 120.7 km (75.0 mi)

Stage 7 Result

| | Rider | Team | Time |
|---|---|---|---|
| 1 | Lieuwe Westra (NED) | Astana | 2h 36' 14" |
| 2 | Marcus Burghardt (GER) | BMC Racing Team | + 1' 22" |
| 3 | Thomas Voeckler (FRA) | Team Europcar | + 1' 22" |
| 4 | Maciej Paterski (POL) | CCC–Polsat–Polkowice | + 1' 26" |
| 5 | Yoann Bagot (FRA) | Cofidis | + 1' 36" |
| 6 | Jan Polanc (SLO) | Lampre–Merida | + 2' 07" |
| 7 | Alberto Contador (ESP) | Tinkoff–Saxo | + 2' 07" |
| 8 | Romain Bardet (FRA) | Ag2r–La Mondiale | + 2' 07" |
| 9 | Arnold Jeannesson (FRA) | FDJ.fr | + 2' 07" |
| 10 | Joaquim Rodríguez (ESP) | Team Katusha | + 2' 07" |

Final General Classification

| | Rider | Team | Time |
|---|---|---|---|
| 1 | Joaquim Rodríguez (ESP) | Team Katusha | 29h 41' 34" |
| 2 | Alberto Contador (ESP) | Tinkoff–Saxo | + 4" |
| 3 | Tejay van Garderen (USA) | BMC Racing Team | + 7" |
| 4 | Romain Bardet (FRA) | Ag2r–La Mondiale | + 10" |
| 5 | Nairo Quintana (COL) | Movistar Team | + 10" |
| 6 | Chris Froome (GBR) | Team Sky | + 17" |
| 7 | Andrew Talansky (USA) | Garmin–Sharp | + 18" |
| 8 | Domenico Pozzovivo (ITA) | Ag2r–La Mondiale | + 26" |
| 9 | Warren Barguil (FRA) | Giant–Shimano | + 42" |
| 10 | Robert Kišerlovski (CRO) | Trek Factory Racing | + 48" |

== Classification leadership table ==
In the 2014 Volta a Catalunya, four different jerseys were awarded. For the general classification, calculated by adding each cyclist's finishing times on each stage, and allowing time bonuses in intermediate sprints and at the finish in mass-start stages, the leader received a white and green jersey. This classification was considered the most important of the 2014 Volta a Catalunya, and the winner of the classification was considered the winner of the race.

Additionally, there was a sprints classification, which awarded a white jersey. In the sprints classification, cyclists received points for finishing in the top 3 at intermediate sprint points during each stage; these intermediate sprints also offered bonus seconds towards the general classification. A special sprints classification was also contested, with points on offer at a specific point during the stage; the classification was named in honour of former cyclist Miguel Poblet, who died in 2013. There was also a mountains classification, the leadership of which was marked by a red jersey. In the mountains classification, points were won by reaching the top of a climb before other cyclists, with more points available for the higher-categorised climbs.

There was also a classification for teams, in which the times of the best three cyclists per team on each stage were added together; the leading team at the end of the race was the team with the lowest total time.

| Stage | Winner | General classification | Mountains classification | Sprints classification | Special sprints classification | Teams classification |
|---|---|---|---|---|---|---|
| 1 | Luka Mezgec | Luka Mezgec | Romain Lemarchand | Boris Vallée | Romain Lemarchand | Omega Pharma–Quick-Step |
| 2 | Luka Mezgec | Luka Mezgec | Romain Lemarchand | Boris Vallée | Michel Koch | Lotto–Belisol |
| 3 | Joaquim Rodríguez | Joaquim Rodríguez | Jack Bobridge | Michel Koch | Michel Koch | Ag2r–La Mondiale |
| 4 | Tejay van Garderen | Joaquim Rodríguez | Stef Clement | Michel Koch | Michel Koch | Garmin–Sharp |
| 5 | Luka Mezgec | Joaquim Rodríguez | Stef Clement | Michel Koch | Michel Koch | Garmin–Sharp |
| 6 | Stef Clement | Joaquim Rodríguez | Stef Clement | Michel Koch | Michel Koch | Garmin–Sharp |
| 7 | Lieuwe Westra | Joaquim Rodríguez | Stef Clement | Michel Koch | Michel Koch | Garmin–Sharp |
| Final | | Joaquim Rodríguez | Stef Clement | Michel Koch | Michel Koch | Garmin–Sharp |
