= Michel Koch =

German cyclist (born 1991)

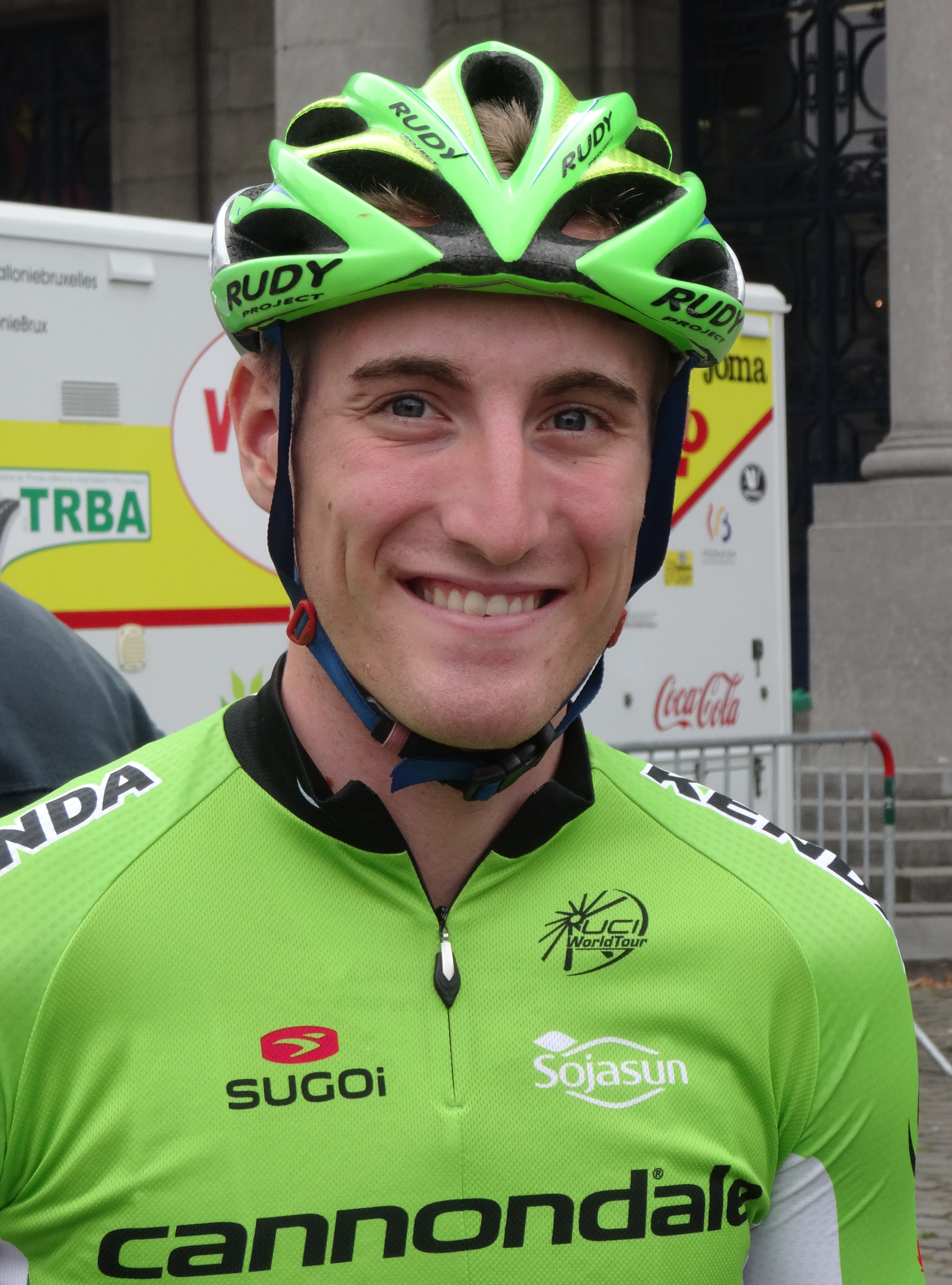
- Koch at the 2014 Brussels Cycling Classic

Personal information
- Full name: Michel Koch
- Born: 15 October 1991 (age 35) Wuppertal, Germany

Cycling career
- Sport: Cycling
- Current team: Retired
- Disciplines: Road; Track
- Role: Rider

Amateur teams
- 2004–2005: RV Endspurt 08 Wuppertal
- 2006: RC Titan Leverkusen
- 2007–2009: RSC Cottbus

Professional teams
- 2010–2012: LKT Team Brandenburg
- 2013–2014: Cannondale
- 2015–2016: Rad-Net Rose Team

Michel Koch (born 15 October 1991) is a German former track and road racing cyclist. Both his grandfather, Wolfgang Koch as well as his parents Christian Koch and Petra Koch, born Stegherr (Mettmann), were successful cyclists.

== Major results ==
2009
1st Time trial, National Junior Road Championships
1st Team pursuit, National Junior Track Championships
1st Stage 2 La Coupe du Président de la Ville de Grudziadz
5th Overall Internationale Niedersachsen-Rundfahrt
6th Overall Driedaagse van Axel
7th Time trial, UCI Juniors World Championships
9th Road race, UEC European Junior Road Championships
2010
National Under-23 Road Championships

2nd Road race
2nd Time trial

5th Overall Thüringen Rundfahrt der U23
10th Overall Troféu Joaquim Agostinho
2011
6th Time trial, UEC European Under-23 Road Championships
7th Overall Ronde de l'Isard
2012
National Track Championships

1st Team pursuit
3rd Individual pursuit

1st Overall Bundesliga
2nd Ingolstädter Straßenpreis
3rd Road race, National Under-23 Road Championships
3rd Cottbus–Görlitz–Cottbus
6th Eschborn-Frankfurt City Loop U23
8th Overall Tour de Berlin
2014
Volta a Catalunya

1st Sprints classification
1st Special sprints classification

9th Münsterland Giro
