= Bastiments =

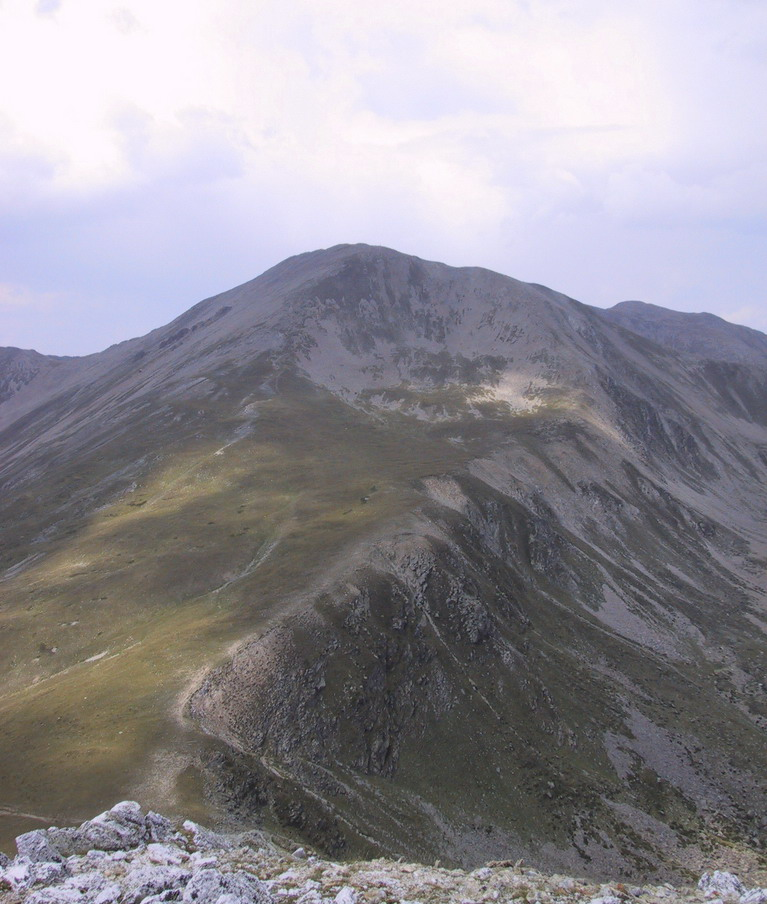
- The summit of Bastiments as seen from Gra de Fajol

Highest point
- Elevation: 2,881 m (9,452 ft)
- Listing: Mountains of Catalonia
- Coordinates: 42°25′38.65″N 02°14′3.06″E

Geography
- Location within Pyrenees
- Location: Pyrénées-Orientales, France; Catalonia, Spain
- Parent range: Pyrenees

Bastiments (Occitan: Bâtiments) is a mountain peak at the easternmost side of the Pyrenees mountain range. It is located on the Spanish-French border, within the confluence of the Spanish municipalities of Setcases and Queralbs and the French commune of Fontpédrouse. it has an altitude of 2,881 metres (9,452 ft) above sea level.

== See also ==
- Vall de Núria
