= Torrefarrera =

- Municipality
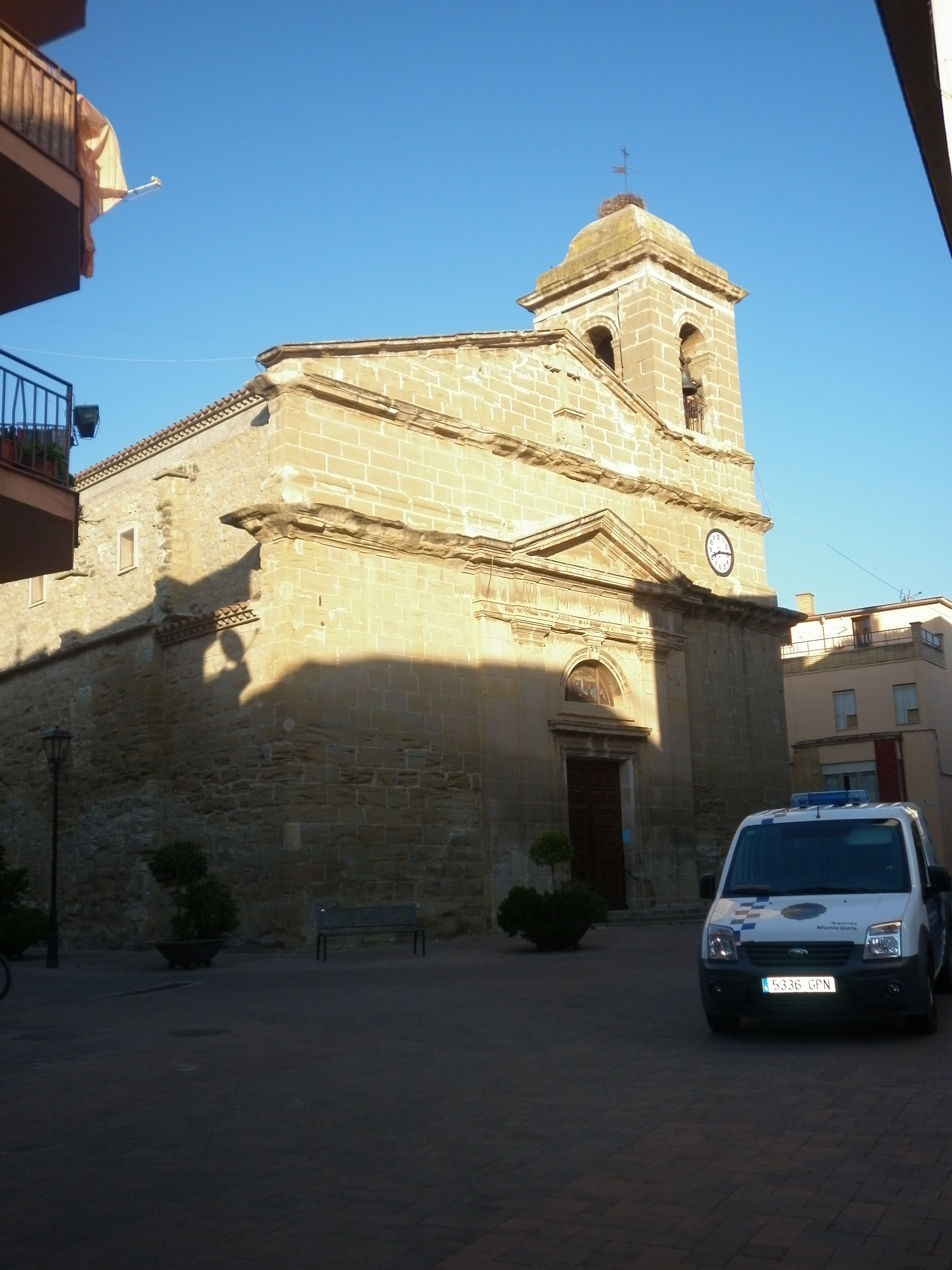
- Holy Cross church

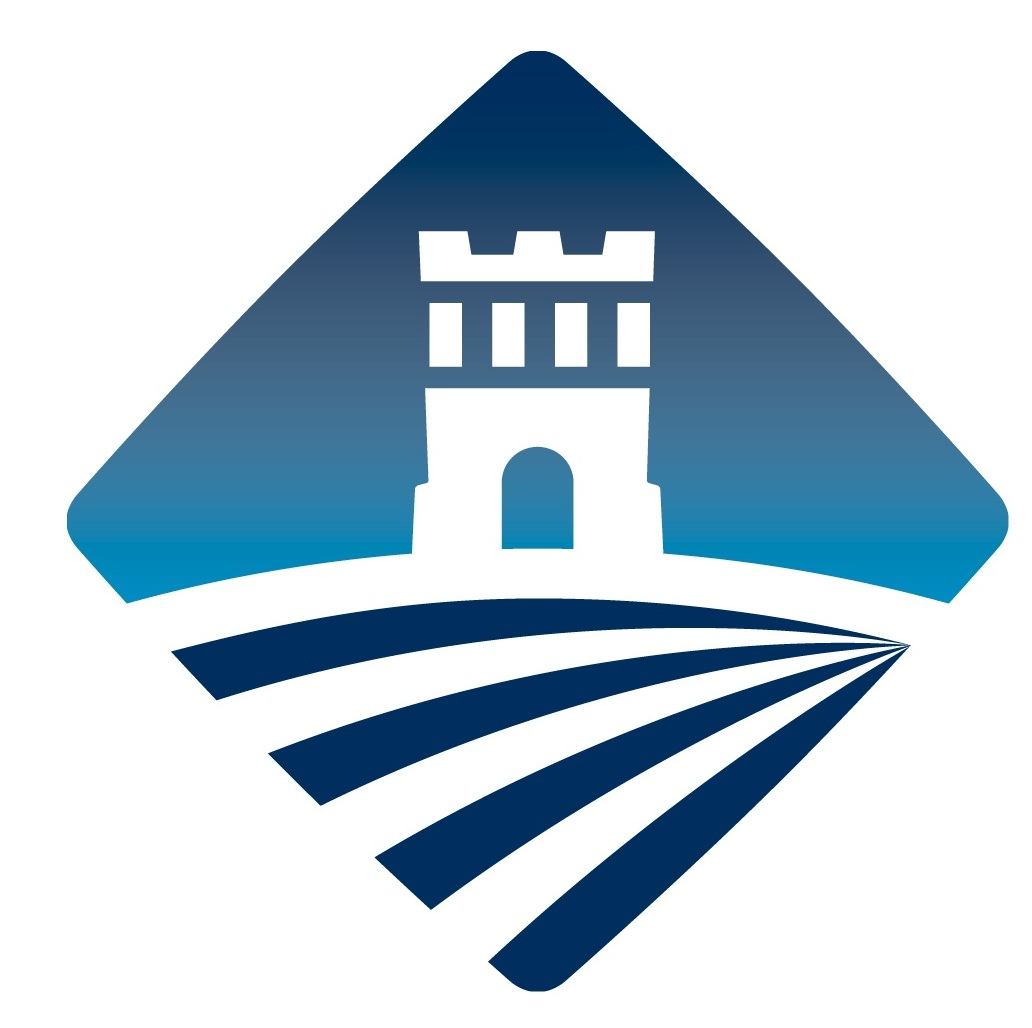
- Flag Coat of arms

- Location in Catalonia
- Coordinates: 41°40′30″N 0°36′29″E
- Country: Spain
- Community: Catalonia
- Province: Lleida
- Comarca: Segrià

Government
  - Mayor: Jordi Latorre Sotus (2015)

Area
  - Total: 23.5 km^{2} (9.1 sq mi)
- Elevation: 214 m (702 ft)

Population (2025-01-01)
  - Total: 4,900
  - Density: 210/km^{2} (540/sq mi)
- Website: torrefarrera.cat

Torrefarrera (Catalan pronunciation: [ˌtorefaˈreɾɛ]) is a village and municipality in the province of Lleida and autonomous community of Catalonia, Spain. The municipality is split in two parts, the south-eastern part having nearly all the population.

It has a population of 4,900 (register office, 2025).
