= Gra de Fajol Petit =

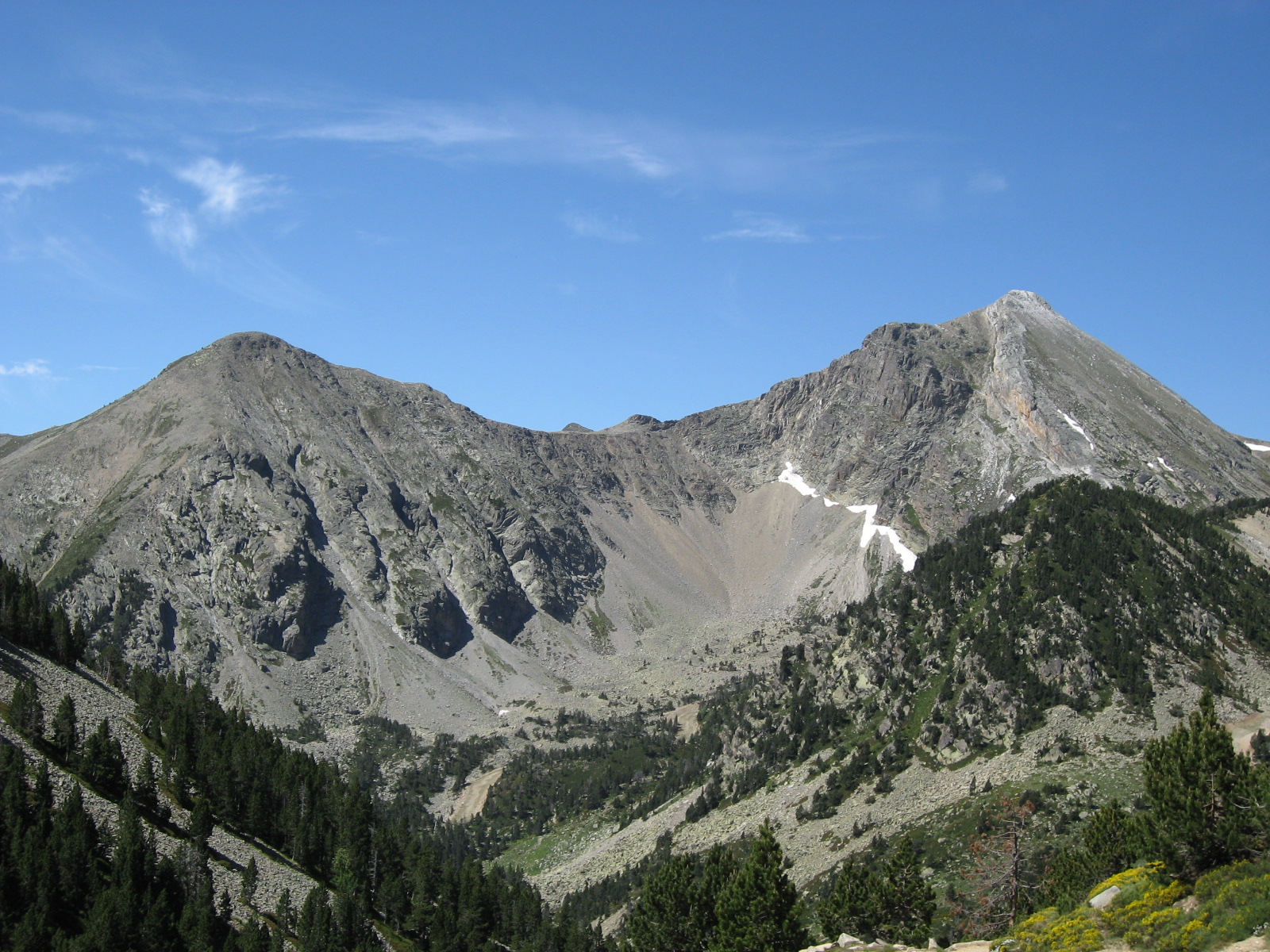
- From left to right: Gra de Fajol Petit (2,567 m) and Gra de Fajol (2,714 m).

Highest point
- Elevation: 2,567 m (8,422 ft)
- Listing: List of mountains in Catalonia
- Coordinates: 42°24′47.69″N 02°15′34.72″E

Geography
- Location within Pyrenees
- Location: Catalonia, Spain
- Parent range: Pyrenees

Gra de Fajol Petit is a mountain of Catalonia, Spain. Located in the Pyrenees, it has an altitude of 2,567 metres (8,422 ft) above sea level.
