= Setcases =

- Municipality
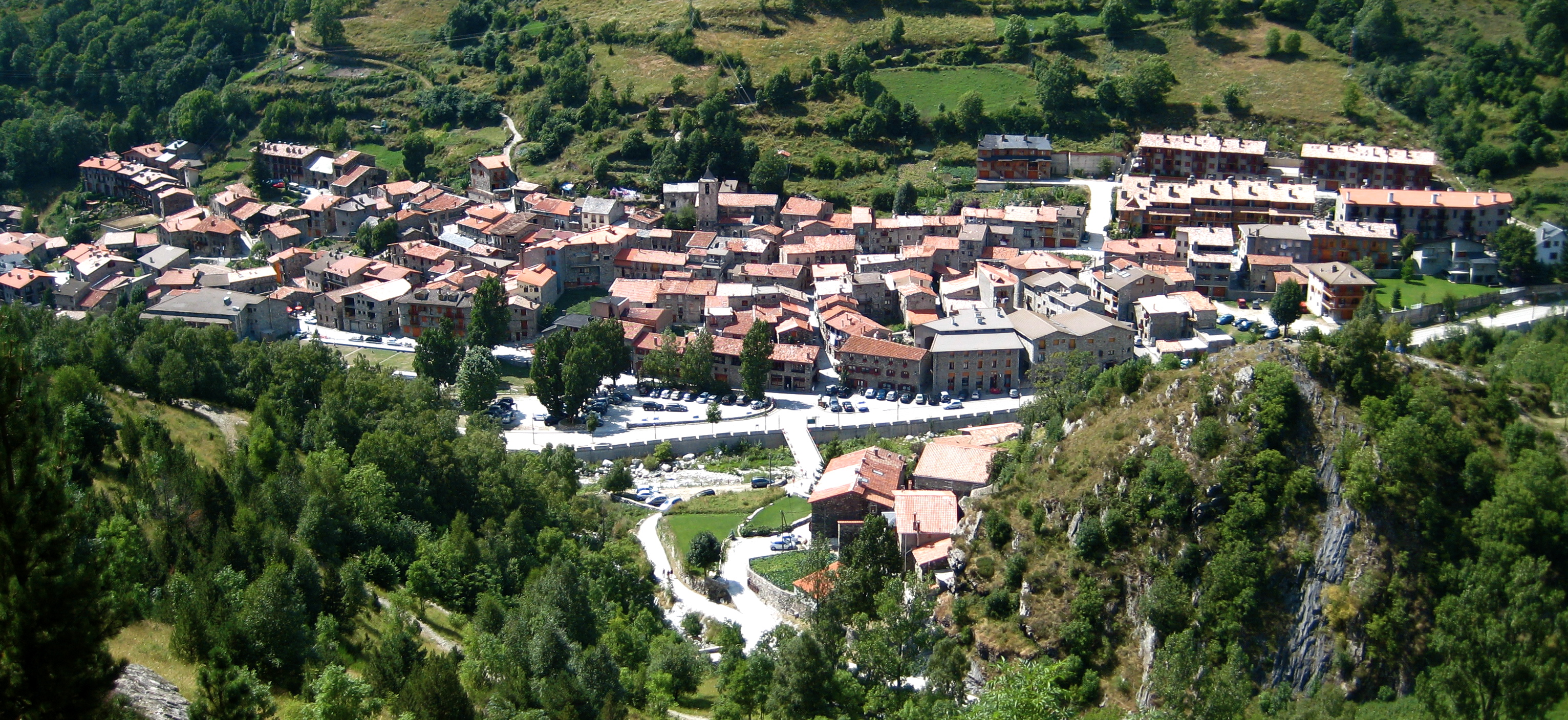

- Flag Coat of arms

- Location in Catalonia Setcases (Spain)
- Coordinates: 42°22′37″N 2°18′9″E
- Country: Spain
- Community: Catalonia
- Province: Girona
- Comarca: Ripollès

Government
  - Mayor: Carlos Fernandez Amer (2015)

Area
  - Total: 49.1 km^{2} (19.0 sq mi)
- Elevation: 1,230 m (4,040 ft)

Population (2025-01-01)
  - Total: 195
  - Density: 3.97/km^{2} (10.3/sq mi)
- Demonym(s): Setcasencs, setcasenques
- Website: setcases.cat

Setcases (Catalan pronunciation: [ˌsɛtˈkazəs, ˌsɛˈkːazəs]; literally meaning "Seven Houses", set "seven" and cases "houses") is a municipality and town in the Pyrenean comarca of Ripollès in Girona, Catalonia, Spain, near the French border. The Ter River is born in the mountains just above Setcases. The current mayor is Jaume Busquets i Bartolí.

The name Setcases has been documented back to 965, from records of some donations made by Count Sunifred of Besalú, one of the Catalan counties, in the nearby monastery of Sant Pere de Camprodon.

The church contains a Baroque altarpiece dedicated to Saint Michael, which is the only such example of one in all of the Camprodon Valley. Unlike many other relics, it was saved from being burned by anarchists and communists during the Spanish Civil War.

Today, Setcases has most of its economic base in year-round tourism, including hiking in the warmer months (e.g. Ulldeter hiking circuit) and skiing during the winter season with a lift at Vallter 2000.

Vallter 2000 is a attraction for tourists from all Spain.

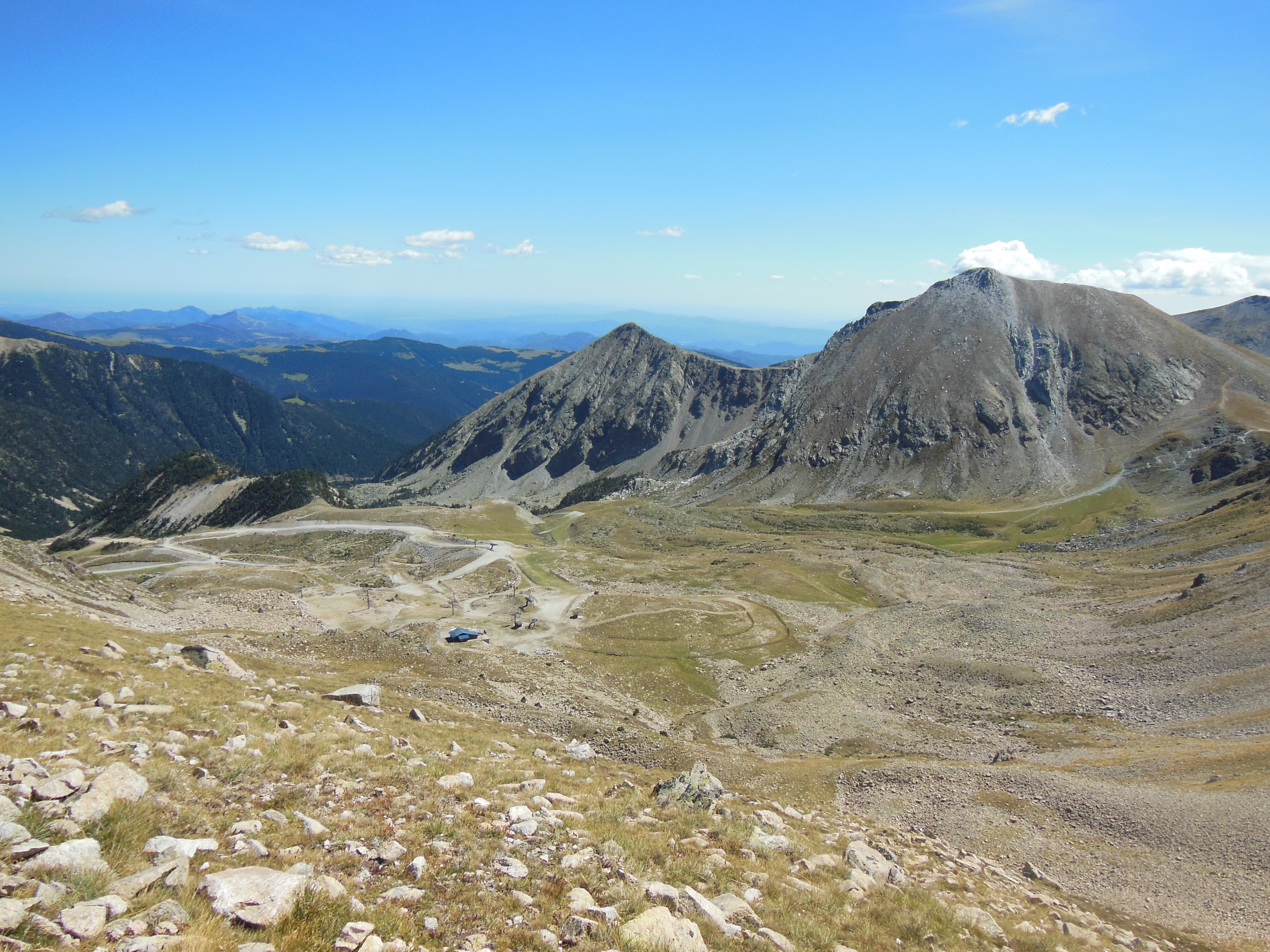
View across the northern part of the Setcases municipi. Here, the summits of Gra de Fajol (2714m) and Gra de Fajol Petit (2567m) tower over the Vallter 2000 ski station.

The weather is very cold, specially in winter the temperature can get to about -20 Celsius. In summer the temperature can rise to 20-25 degrees Celsius.
