= Pic de la Dona =

Mountain in Catalonia, Spain

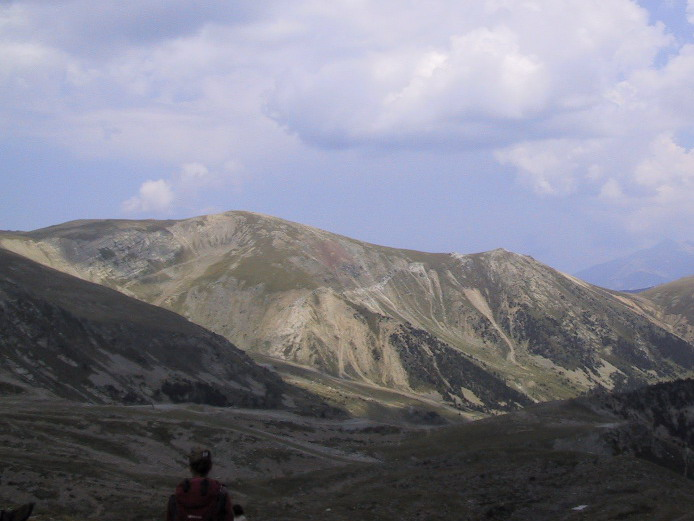

Highest point
- Elevation: 2,702 m (8,865 ft)
- Coordinates: 42°26′16″N 2°15′41″E

Geography
- Location within Catalonia
- Location: Catalonia, Spain
- Parent range: Pyrenees

Pic de la Dona is a mountain of Catalonia, Spain. Located in the Pyrenees, it has an elevation of 2,702 metres (8,865 ft) above sea level.

== See also ==
- List of mountains in Catalonia
