= Gra de Fajol =

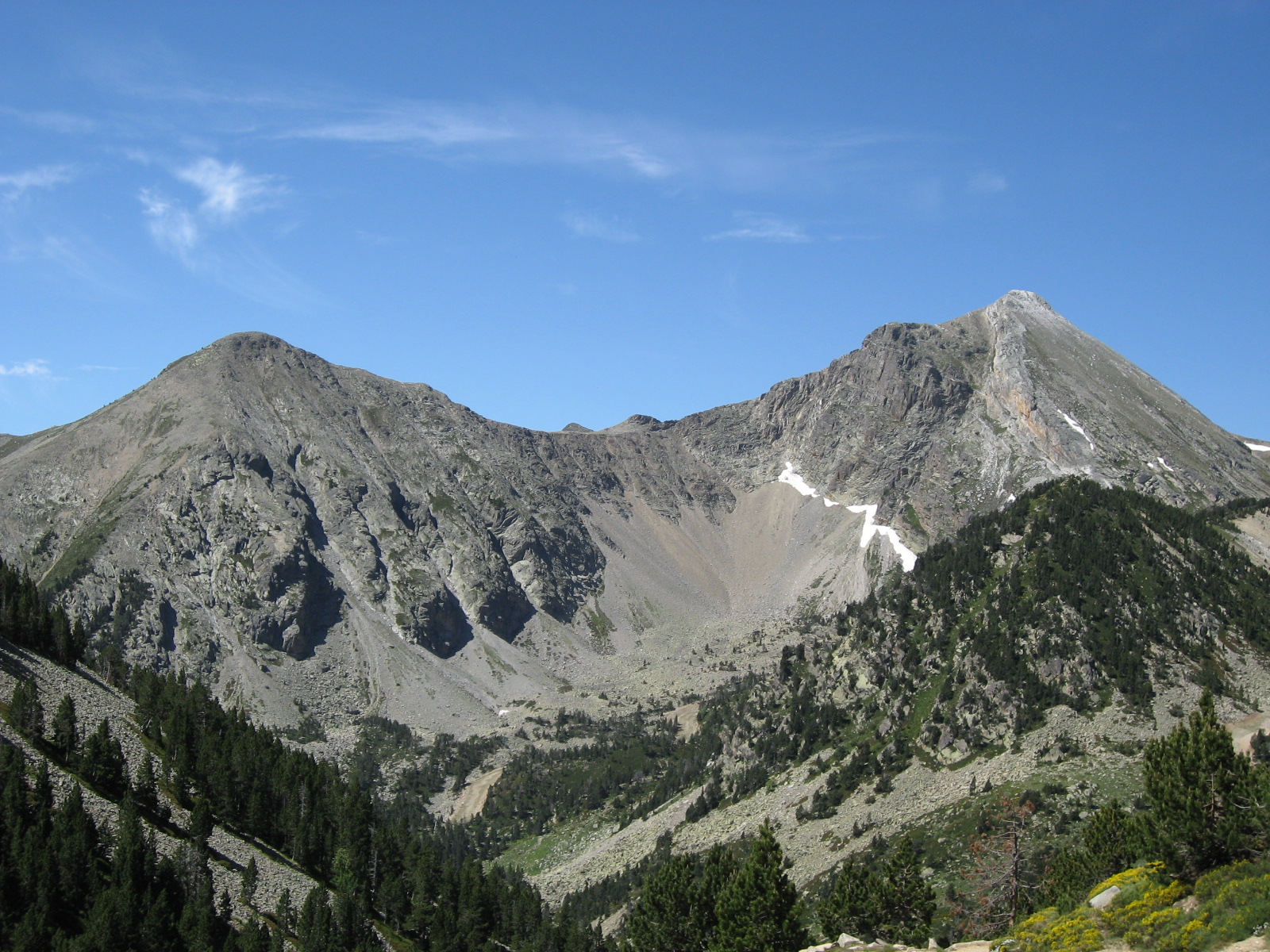
- From left to right: Gra de Fajol Petit (2,567 m) and Gra de Fajol (2,714 m).

Highest point
- Elevation: 2,714 m (8,904 ft)
- Listing: List of mountains in Catalonia
- Coordinates: 42°24′55.58″N 02°14′52.10″E

Geography
- Location within Pyrenees
- Location: Catalonia, Spain
- Parent range: Pyrenees

Gra de Fajol is a mountain of Catalonia, Spain. Located in the Pyrenees, it has an altitude of 2,714 metres (8,904 ft) above sea level.

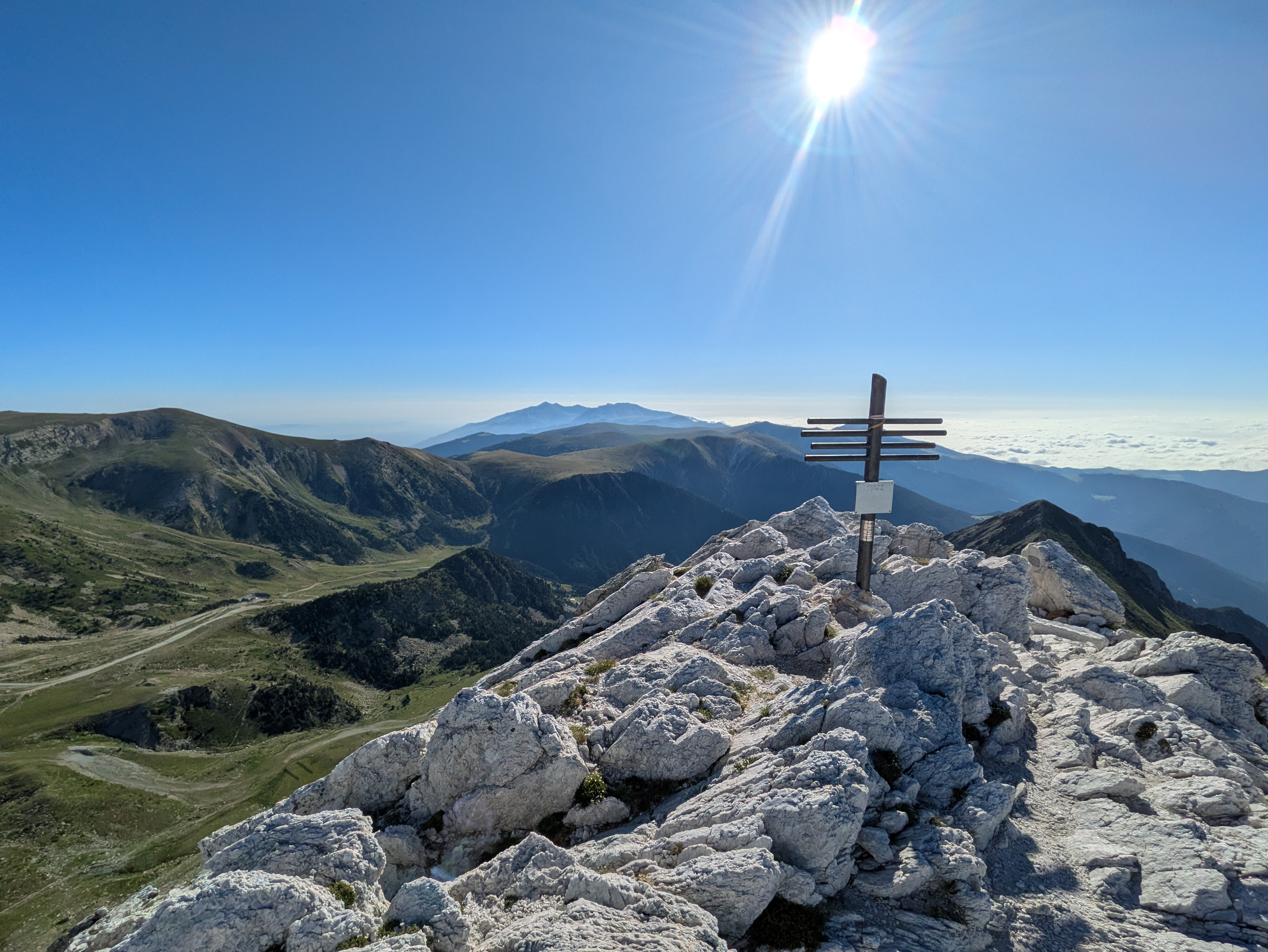
The summit of Gra de Fajol mountain, looking east. The summit is located on a wide vein of quartz.
