= Free Catalan Territory =

Free Catalan Territory (Catalan: Territori Català Lliure) is a designation adopted since 2012 by a number of Catalan municipal and comarcal councils. These councils passed symbolic motions declaring that Spanish state laws would apply only provisionally in their territory, pending the creation of Catalan legislation after a potential future declaration of independence. The movement began in early September 2012, when Sant Pere de Torelló was the first town to adopt such a declaration. In the following weeks dozens of municipalities and several county councils joined. Several of those motions were later challenged in administrative courts and some were annulled.

Free Catalan Territory (in Catalan, Territori Català Lliure) was the expression chosen by the councillors of Sant Pere de Torelló in order to define the status quo of the municipality on September 3, 2012, and was also the first town in Catalonia to give itself this name. From its new condition, the council of Sant Pere de Torelló announced that the October 12, holiday becomes an ordinary weekday, directly conflicting the Spanish legislation.

Since then, more municipalities joined this initiative and approved similar declarations to Sant Pere de Torelló's. Also, there are some municipalities that preferred approving independentist motions, but without explicitly declaring themselves Free Catalan Territory, like Caldes de Montbui or Tàrrega.

The October 11th 2012 the first comarcal declaration was approved. The Comarcal Council of La Garrotxa approved a collective motion to declare all that region "Free and Sovereign Catalan Territory". Also, the same day, the Comarcal Council of the Alt Penedès approved supporting those municipalities that approve that kind of motion, hanging an Estelada flag at the balcony of the offices of the Comarcal Council as a symbol "of Catalonia's people desires of sovereignty".

After the first month since Sant Pere de Torelló's declaration, a Catalan newspaper stated that there are approximately 660,000 "free Catalan citizens", which represent almost 9% of Catalonia's total population.

== Aftermath and relationship with wider independence movement ==
The initiative was part of the broader independence mobilisation that followed the 2010 Constitutional Court ruling on the Statute and the large pro-independence demonstrations of 2012. The “Free Catalan Territory” declarations were one local expression of that movement and were later eclipsed by subsequent events in the independence process.

== Legal challenges and judicial rulings ==
The motions were declaratory and political in nature: in general they were symbolic statements by local councils rather than enforceable changes to legal competences. Some municipalities did adopt consequential local administrative adjustments (for example symbolic calendar changes or flag displays), but the motions themselves did not confer new legal powers on municipalities.

== Nature and effects ==
The motions were declaratory and political in nature: in general they were symbolic statements by local councils rather than enforceable changes to legal competences. Some municipalities did adopt consequential local administrative adjustments (for example symbolic calendar changes or flag displays), but the motions themselves did not confer new legal powers on municipalities.

== Origins and spread ==
The first council to use the expression “Territori Català Lliure” was Sant Pere de Torelló on 3 September 2012; the formula spread rapidly through September and October 2012 as dozens of municipalities and some comarcal councils approved similar motions. By 9 October 2012 multiple newspapers were reporting around a hundred municipalities had approved such motions.

== Municipalities declared Free Catalan Territory ==
Since September 3, 2012, 197 Catalan municipalities and five Comarcal councils have declared themselves Free Catalan Territory, representing approximately 20.2% of whole Catalonia's lands.

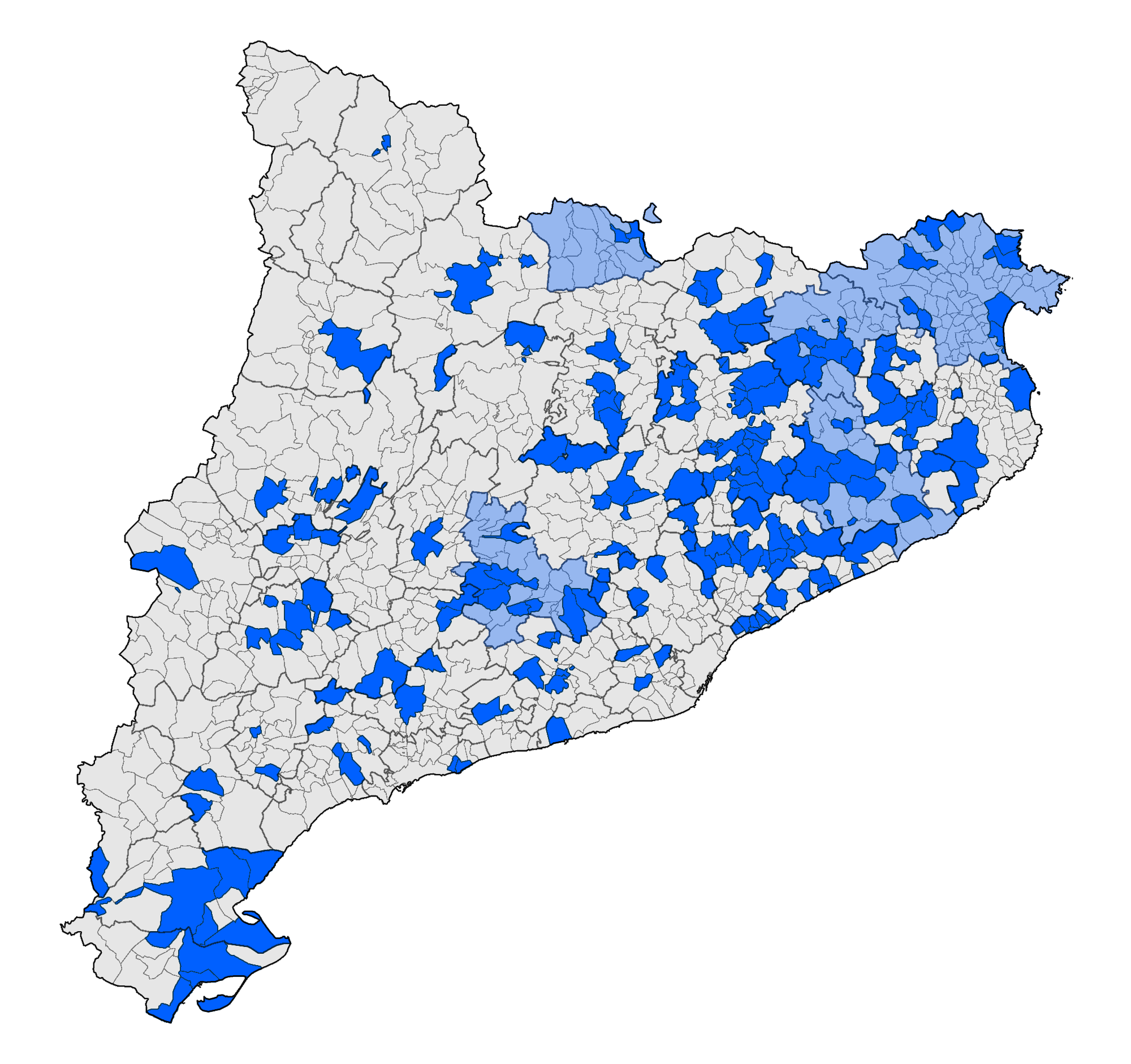
Map of Catalan municipalities (dark blue) and comarques (light blue) that have so far declared themselves Free Catalan Territory.

No.	Municipality	Comarca	Declaration Date	References
1	Sant Pere de Torelló	Osona	September 3, 2012	
2	Calldetenes	Osona	September 3, 2012	
3	Cervià de les Garrigues	Garrigues	September 6, 2012	
4	Marçà	Priorat	September 10, 2012	
5	La Bisbal del Penedès	Baix Penedès	September 10, 2012	
6	Premià de Dalt	Maresme	September 10, 2012	
7	Arenys de Munt	Maresme	September 13, 2012	
8	Bolvir	Cerdanya	September 15, 2012	
9	Vic	Osona	September 17, 2012	
10	Tortosa	Baix Ebre	September 17, 2012	
11	Seva	Osona	September 17, 2012	
12	Argentona	Maresme	September 17, 2012	
13	Celrà	Gironès	September 18, 2012	
14	Ullastrell	Vallès Occidental	September 19, 2012	
15	Sant Llorenç de Morunys	Solsonès	September 19, 2012	
16	Vallfogona de Ripollès	Ripollès	September 20, 2012	
17	Collbató	Baix Llobregat	September 20, 2012	
18	Sant Jaume de Llierca	Garrotxa	September 20, 2012	
19	Valls	Alt Camp	September 21, 2012	
20	Vilablareix	Gironès	September 21, 2012	
21	Orpí	Anoia	September 21, 2012	
22	Carme	Anoia	September 21, 2012	
23	Tavèrnoles	Osona	September 24, 2012	
24	Cruïlles, Monells i Sant Sadurní de l'Heura	Baix Empordà	September 24, 2012	
25	Navàs	Bages	September 24, 2012	
26	Sant Andreu de Llavaneres	Maresme	September 24, 2012	
27	Sant Gregori	Gironès	September 24, 2012	
28	Els Prats de Rei	Anoia	September 24, 2012	
29	Sant Julià de Vilatorta	Osona	September 25, 2012	
30	Ripoll	Ripollès	September 25, 2012	
31	Manlleu	Osona	September 25, 2012	
32	Vidreres	Selva	September 25, 2012	
33	Igualada	Anoia	September 25, 2012	
34	Sarrià de Ter	Gironès	September 25, 2012	
35	El Perelló	Baix Ebre	September 25, 2012	
36	Vilafranca del Penedès	Alt Penedès	September 25, 2012	
37	Sant Julià de Ramis	Gironès	September 25, 2012	
38	Canet d'Adri	Gironès	September 25, 2012	
39	Deltebre	Baix Ebre	September 26, 2012	
40	Tona	Osona	September 26, 2012	
41	Prats de Lluçanès	Osona	September 26, 2012	
42	La Garriga	Vallès Oriental	September 26, 2012	
43	L'Ametlla del Vallès	Vallès Oriental	September 26, 2012	
44	Porqueres	Pla de l'Estany	September 26, 2012	
45	Sant Vicenç de Torelló	Osona	September 26, 2012	
46	Montblanc	Conca de Barberà	September 26, 2012	
47	Esterri d'Àneu	Pallars Sobirà	September 26, 2012	
48	Arenys de Mar	Maresme	September 26, 2012	
49	Argençola	Anoia	September 26, 2012	
50	La Vall d'en Bas	Garrotxa	September 26, 2012	
51	Alcarràs	Segrià	September 27, 2012	
52	Les Borges del Camp	Baix Camp	September 27, 2012	
53	Jorba	Anoia	September 27, 2012	
54	Fornells de la Selva	Gironès	September 27, 2012	
55	Linyola	Pla d'Urgell	September 27, 2012	
56	Sant Antoni de Vilamajor	Vallès Oriental	September 27, 2012	
57	Sant Martí de Tous	Anoia	September 27, 2012	
58	Alella	Maresme	September 27, 2012	
59	Cassà de la Selva	Gironès	September 27, 2012	
60	Palau-solità i Plegamans	Vallès Occidental	September 27, 2012	
61	Canet de Mar	Maresme	September 27, 2012	
62	Collsuspina	Osona	September 27, 2012	
63	Sant Esteve de Palautordera	Vallès Oriental	September 27, 2012	
64	Cardedeu	Vallès Oriental	September 27, 2012	
65	Els Hostalets de Pierola	Anoia	September 27, 2012	
66	Bellvís	Pla d'Urgell	September 27, 2012	
67	Puig-reig	Berguedà	September 27, 2012	
68	Santa Eugènia de Berga	Osona	September 27, 2012	
69	Balaguer	Noguera	September 27, 2012	
70	Casserres	Berguedà	September 27, 2012	
71	Torrelles de Llobregat	Baix Llobregat	September 27, 2012	
72	Sant Celoni	Vallès Oriental	September 27, 2012	
73	Les Borges Blanques	Garrigues	September 27, 2012	
74	Montgai	Noguera	September 27, 2012	
75	Castelló d'Empúries	Alt Empordà	September 27, 2012	
76	Móra d'Ebre	Ribera d'Ebre	September 27, 2012	
77	Flaçà	Gironès	September 27, 2012	
78	Les Franqueses del Vallès	Vallès Oriental	September 27, 2012	
79	Fontcoberta	Pla de l'Estany	September 27, 2012	
80	Santa Eulàlia de Ronçana	Vallès Oriental	September 27, 2012	
81	Vilassar de Dalt	Maresme	September 27, 2012	
82	Arsèguel	Alt Urgell	September 27, 2012	
83	Bigues i Riells	Vallès Oriental	September 27, 2012	
84	L'Ametlla de Mar	Baix Ebre	September 28, 2012	
85	Sant Martí Sarroca	Alt Penedès	September 28, 2012	
86	Sant Joan de les Abadesses	Ripollès	September 28, 2012	
87	Espinelves	Osona	September 28, 2012	
88	Llanars	Ripollès	September 28, 2012	
89	Gallifa	Vallès Occidental	September 28, 2012	
90	Altafulla	Tarragonès	September 29, 2012	
91	Arbúcies	Selva	September 29, 2012	
92	Corbera de Llobregat	Baix Llobregat	October 2, 2012	
93	Les Piles	Conca de Barberà	October 2012	
94	Llançà	Alt Empordà	October 3, 2012	
95	Cercs	Berguedà	October 3, 2012	
96	Isona i Conca Dellà	Pallars Jussà	October 3, 2012	
97	Vilamaniscle	Alt Empordà	October 3, 2012	
98	Calella	Maresme	October 4, 2012	
99	Viladamat	Alt Empordà	October 4, 2012	
100	Arnes	Terra Alta	October 4, 2012	
101	Arbolí	Baix Camp	October 2012	
102	Santa Bàrbara	Montsià	October 5, 2012	
103	La Seu d'Urgell	Alt Urgell	October 8, 2012	
104	Puigcerdà	Cerdanya	October 8, 2012	
105	Vilanova i la Geltrú	Garraf	October 8, 2012	
106	Hostalric	Selva	October 8, 2012	
107	Sallent	Bages	October 8, 2012	
108	Lladó	Alt Empordà	October 8, 2012	
109	Castellfollit de la Roca	Garrotxa	October 9, 2012	
110	Miravet	Ribera d'Ebre	October 9, 2012	
111	Olost	Osona	October 9, 2012	
112	Sant Hilari Sacalm	Selva	October 10, 2012	
113	Artés	Bages	October 10, 2012	
114	Alpens	Osona	October 10, 2012	
115	Torroella de Montgrí	Baix Empordà	October 11, 2012	
116	Ivars d'Urgell	Pla d'Urgell	October 11, 2012	
117	Taradell	Osona	October 11, 2012	
118	Cervera	Segarra	October 11, 2012	
119	Santa Coloma de Queralt	Conca de Barberà	October 11, 2012	
120	Sant Pere de Vilamajor	Vallès Oriental	October 12, 2012	
121	Prades	Baix Camp	October 12, 2012	
122	Avià	Berguedà	October 12, 2012	
123	El Brull	Osona	October 15, 2012	
124	Breda	Selva	October 15, 2012	
125	Roda de Ter	Osona	October 16, 2012	

No.	Comarcal Council	Province	Declaration Date	References
1	Garrotxa's Comarcal Council	Girona	October 11, 2012	

== See also ==
- Catalan independence
- Assemblea Nacional Catalana
- Association of Municipalities for Independence
- Catalan independence referendums, 2009–2011
- 2012 Catalan independence demonstration
