= Fornells de la Selva =

- Municipality
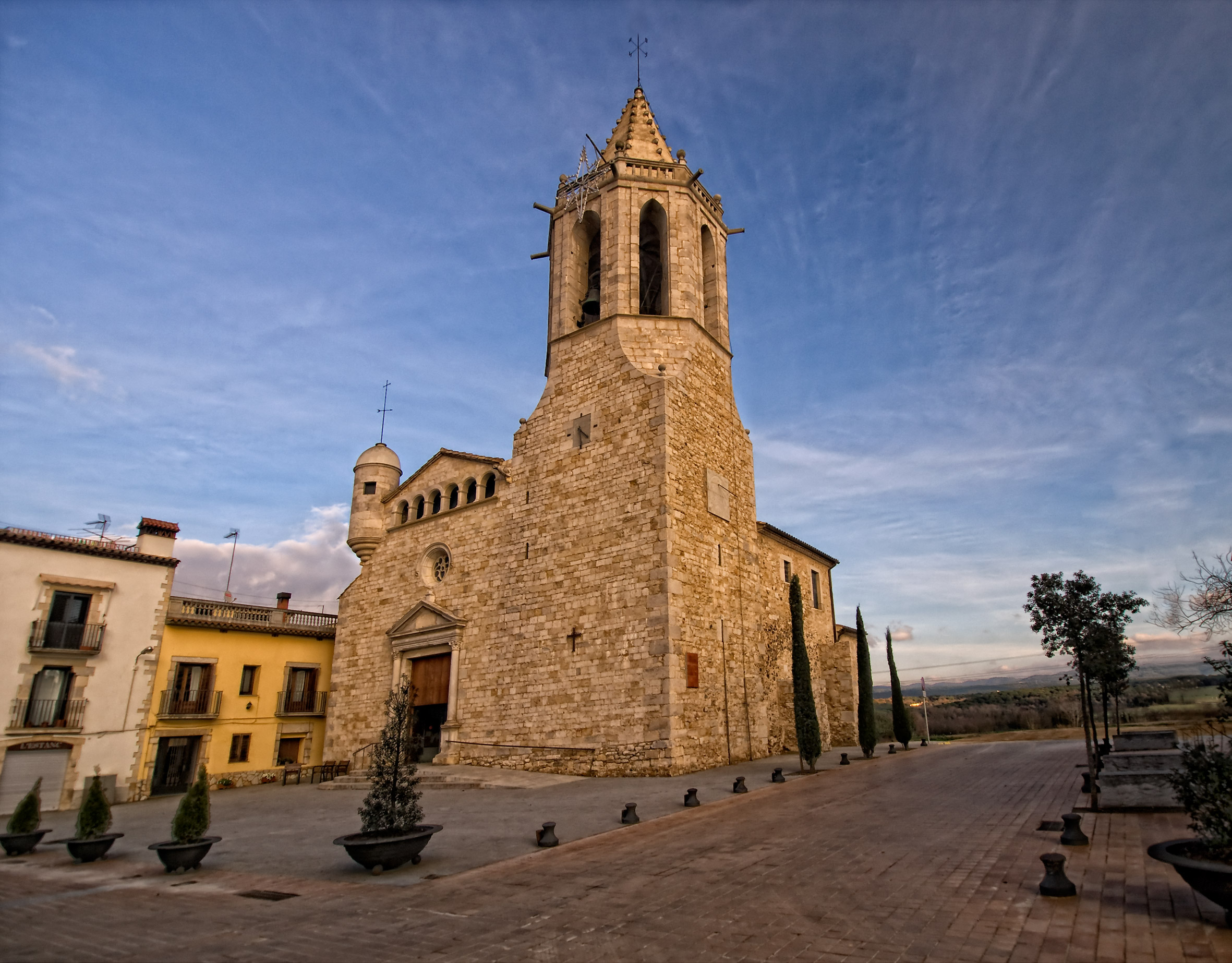
- Church of St. Cugat

- Flag Coat of arms

- Location in Catalonia Fornells de la Selva (Spain)
- Coordinates: 41°56′N 2°49′E
- Country: Spain
- Community: Catalonia
- Province: Girona
- Comarca: Gironès

Government
  - mayor: Narcís Boschdemont Esparraguera (2015)

Area
  - Total: 11.9 km^{2} (4.6 sq mi)
- Elevation: 102 m (335 ft)

Population (2025-01-01)
  - Total: 2,818
  - Density: 237/km^{2} (613/sq mi)
- Demonym(s): Fornellenc, fornellenca
- Postal code: 170736
- Website: www.fornellsdelaselva.cat

Fornells de la Selva (Catalan pronunciation: [fuɾˈneʎz ðə lə ˈsɛlβə]) is a municipality in the comarca of Gironès that forms part of the urban area of Girona.

The northern boundary is with the municipality of Girona; the southern is with Riudellots de la Selva and Campllong; the east with Quart and Llambilles; and the west with Vilablareix and Aiguaviva. The municipality covers an area of 11.88 square kilometres (4.59 sq mi) and the population in 2014 was 2,479.

== Transportation ==
Fornells de la Selva is located 7 km south of Girona via the N-IIa. It also has its own railway station (with ticket sales currently closed) which is served by Renfe's Regional line from Barcelona and to Portbou. It is also 5 km from the Girona-Costa Brava Airport.
