= List of Constitutional Court of Spain rulings against Catalan Parliament Laws =

This is a list of rulings from the Constitutional Court of Spain against laws from the Parliament of Catalonia. From 2012, the Spanish Government has filed 32 appeals with the Constitutional Court of Spain against Catalan laws, both against legal rulings linked to the Catalan independence movement as well as appeals against Catalan laws to stop energy poverty or related to commercial and business hours.

Title	Law Code	Date / DOGC	Date of cancellation or suspension ruling	Reference
Popular enquiries law	4/2010	March 4, 2010	May 10, 2017	
Audovisual materials law	22/2005 i 2/2012		June 29, 2017	
Commercial and Business hours law	4/2012 i 2/2014		December 15, 2017	
Bank levies law	5/2012	March 20, 2012	May 2, 2015	
Energy poverty law	6/2013	December 23, 2013	October 22, 2014	
Support budgets law	2/2014	January 27, 2014	June 29, 2015	
Non-referendary popular enquiries law	10/2014	September 26, 2014	September 29, 2014	
Nuclear energy production levy law	12/2014	October 10, 2014	July 21, 2015	
Grievance syndicate law	2008, decisió 3/2015		March 6, 2015	
External action law	3/2015		March 11, 2015	
Commission for the National Transition law	4/2015		December 29, 2015	
Internet operators levy law	9/2015		June 12, 2015	
Catalan consumers code law	10/2015		April 27, 2016	
Commercial business reform law	10/2015		October 7, 2015	
Catalan Tax Agency law	9/2015 - 11/2015		September 14, 2015	
Parliamentary Independence Declaration	11/2015		November 11, 2015	
Constitutionary Process Commission Law	2/2016		March 3, 2016	
External Affairs law	2/2016		February 17, 2016	
Energy poverty law	4/2016		April 8, 2016	
Empty houses levy law	4/2016		April 22, 2016	
Local governments law	4/2016		April 22, 2016	
Gender equality law	4/2016		March 3, 2016	
Fracking banning law	3/2012, 4/2016		April 25, 2016	
Law banning large commercial areas outside cities	4/2016		April 15, 2016	
Law allowing Medinyà to be an independent town from Sant Julià de Ramis	8/2015	June 10, 2015	April 12, 2016	
Emergency housing law, or against evictions	24/2015	July 2015	April 29, 2016	
Law of the sixth book of the Civil Code of Catalonia, relating to obligations and contracts	3/2017	February 15, 2017	June 13, 2017	
Law of digital wills	10/2017	June 27, 2017	April 29, 2016	
Referendum Law	19/2017	September 21, 2017	October 17, 2017	
Law of legal transitoriness	20/2017	September 12, 2017	March 14, 2018	
Law of the Social Protection Agency	Substituted 20/2017	September 1, 2017	October 24, 2017	
Declaration of independence	Parliament and Government abolished before annotation	October 27, 2017	November 8, 2017	
Catalan law against climate change	16/2017	January 26, 2016	December 4, 2017	
Law on the creation of the Catalan CyberSecurity Agency	15/2017	July 25, 2017	December 12, 2017	
