= Albert Jorquera =

Spanish footballer

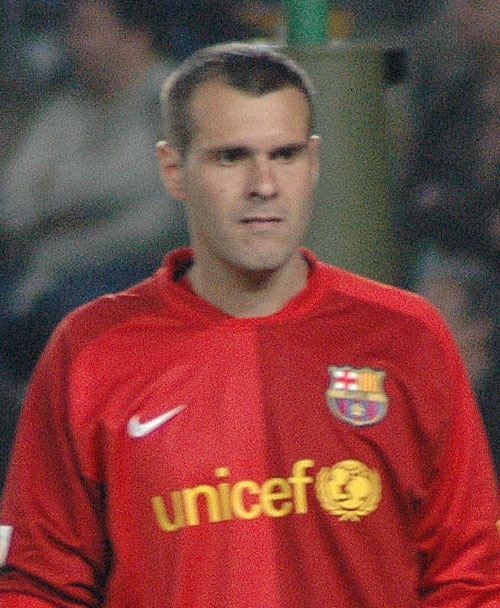
- Jorquera in action for Barcelona in 2007

Personal information
- Full name: Albert Jorquera Fortià
- Date of birth: 3 March 1979 (age 47)
- Place of birth: Bescanó, Spain
- Height: 1.82 m (6 ft 0 in)
- Position: Goalkeeper

Team information
- Current team: Costa Brava (assistant)

Youth career
- Vilobí
- 1994–1998: Barcelona

Senior career*
Years	Team	Apps	(Gls)
1998–1999	Barcelona C	7	(0)
1999–2004	Barcelona B	43	(0)
2000–2001	→ Ceuta (loan)	3	(0)
2001–2002	→ Mataró (loan)	31	(0)
2003–2009	Barcelona	7	(0)
2009–2010	Girona	33	(0)
Total		124	(0)

International career
2007–2010	Catalonia	3	(0)

Managerial career
- 2015–2017: Barcelona (youth assistant)
- 2017–2018: Sion (assistant)
- 2018–2020: Andorra (assistant)
- 2020–2021: Santa Coloma
- 2021–: Costa Brava (assistant)
- * Club domestic league appearances and goals

Albert Jorquera Fortià (born 3 March 1979) is a Spanish former professional footballer who played as a goalkeeper.

He spent the bulk of his career with Barcelona (ten years, including loans), during which time he was never more than second or third choice. He left the club in 2009, and signed with Girona.

== Playing career ==
Born in Bescanó, Girona, Catalonia, Jorquera started playing in FC Barcelona's youth ranks in 1994. After that he went to its C team in 1998, being promoted to FC Barcelona Atlètic the following year.

After loan stints with Segunda División B clubs AD Ceuta and CE Mataró, Jorquera returned as first choice for the reserves. His first appearance in La Liga was against Athletic Bilbao on 17 January 2004 (a 1–1 home draw where he put on a Player of the match performance) and, the next season, following the departure of unsettled Rüştü Reçber, he joined the main squad permanently.

Jorquera signed a new contract in March 2007, until June 2008. However, on 29 December, playing an unofficial game for the Catalonia national team, he suffered an anterior cruciate ligament injury to his right knee, which kept him out of the pitches for six months; eventually, RC Celta de Vigo's José Manuel Pinto was brought in until the end of the campaign.

In March 2008, Jorquera agreed to a new extension, this time running until summer 2010. On 9 December he got his first start in 2008–09, playing in a 2–3 home loss against FC Shakhtar Donetsk in the last UEFA Champions League group-stage match – Víctor Valdés, amongst other regulars, was being rested for El Clásico against Real Madrid, the following Saturday. Additionally, Pinto had previously been cast as the starter in the Copa del Rey.

Jorquera joined Girona FC of the Segunda División on 25 August 2009, with Barcelona having the right to recall him if needed. After starting throughout most of the season, however, the 31-year-old announced his retirement citing personal reasons.

== Coaching career ==
Jorquera joined newly promoted second-tier team UE Llagostera as goalkeeping coach in 2014. In October 2017, he left the Barcelona youth ranks to be Gabri's assistant for FC Sion in Switzerland.

In December 2018, Jorquera was second-in-command to the same former teammate at FC Andorra as part of Gerard Piqué's takeover of the principality-based club playing in Catalan regional football. He received his first outright job in August 2020, at FC Santa Coloma in the microstate's own league. Eleven months later, after elimination from the inaugural edition of the UEFA Europa Conference League by Hibernian, he returned to his job at Llagostera, now renamed UE Costa Brava.

== Style of play ==
Jorquera was known mainly for his reflexes, anticipation and agility. He was also noted for his work-rate and determination throughout his career.

== Personal life ==
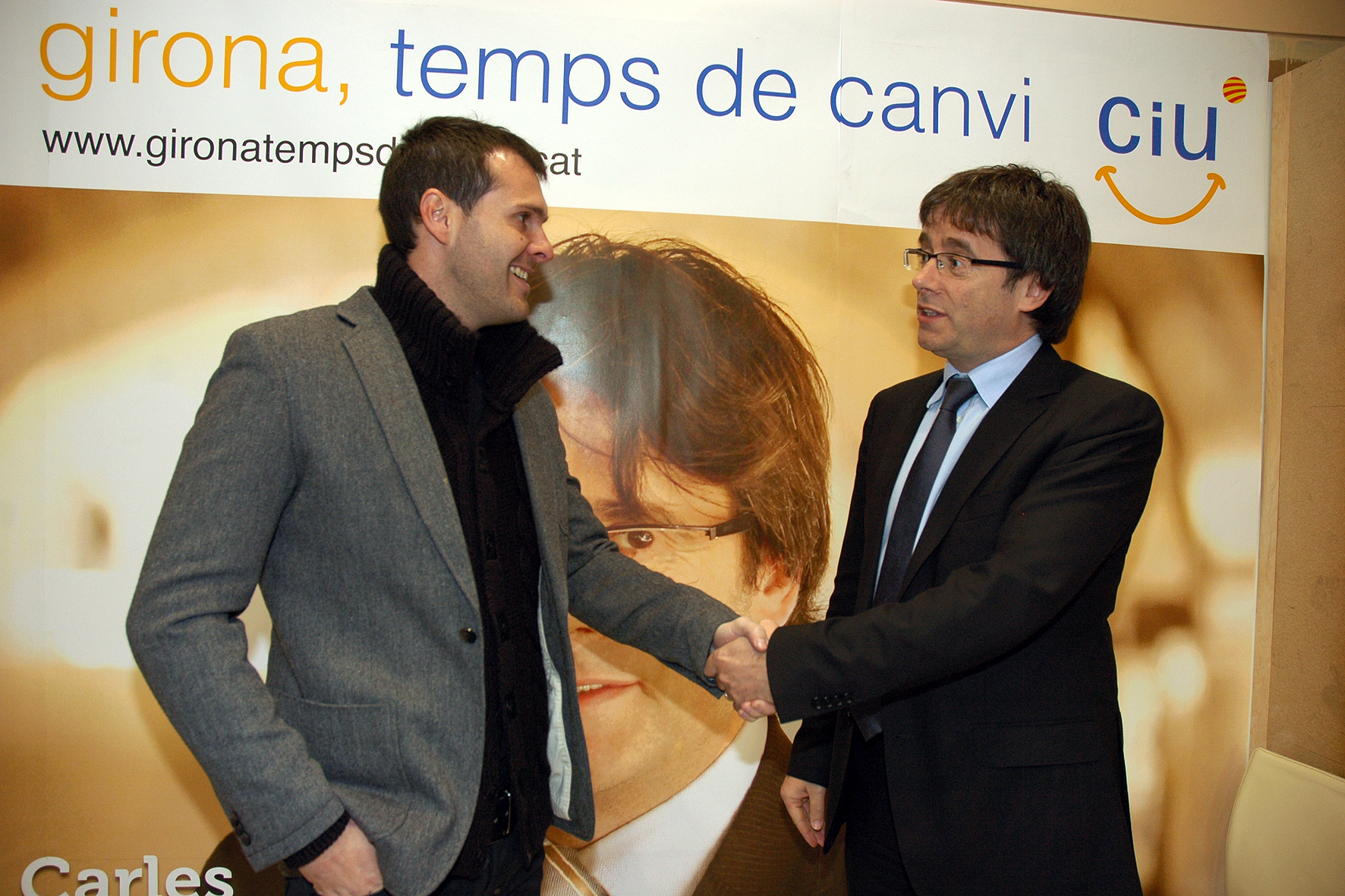
Jorquera (left) and Carles Puigdemont at a Convergence and Union event in 2011

Jorquera was cousin of another Barcelona youth graduate, Marc Crosas. Professionally, he played for Celtic amongst other clubs.

After retiring, he took advantage of his gemology degree from the University of Barcelona and joined the family's jewellery business. In February 2011, he was entered in 12th place on Convergence and Union's (CiU) list for the local elections in Girona, headed by Carles Puigdemont. While his party won, he was not elected as they earned ten seats in the city hall.

== Career statistics ==
Appearances and goals by club, season and competition
Club	Season	League			Cup (Note: Includes Copa del Rey)		Europe		Other		Total	
Club	Season	Division	Apps	Goals	Apps	Goals	Apps	Goals	Apps	Goals	Apps	Goals
Barcelona B	1999–2000	Segunda División B	8	0	—		—		—		8	0
Barcelona B	2002–03	Segunda División B	17	0	—		—		6 (Note: Appearances in Segunda División B play-offs)	0	23	0
Barcelona B	2003–04	Segunda División B	18	0	—		—		—		18	0
Barcelona B	Total		43	0	—		—		6	0	49	0
Barcelona	2003–04	La Liga	2	0	0	0	0	0	—		2	0
Barcelona	2004–05	La Liga	2	0	0	0	0	0	—		2	0
Barcelona	2005–06	La Liga	3	0	4	0	1 (Note: Appearance in UEFA Champions League)	0	—		8	0
Barcelona	2006–07	La Liga	0	0	8	0	0	0	1 (Note: Appearance in Supercopa de España)	0	9	0
Barcelona	2007–08	La Liga	0	0	1	0	1	0	—		2	0
Barcelona	2008–09	La Liga	0	0	0	0	1	0	—		1	0
Barcelona	Total		7	0	13	0	3	0	1	0	24	0
Ceuta (loan)	2000–01	Segunda División B	3	0	1	0	—		—		4	0
Mataró (loan)	2001–02	Segunda División B	31	0	—		—		—		31	0
Girona	2009–10	Segunda División	33	0	1	0	—		—		34	0
Career total			117	0	15	0	3	0	7	0	142	0

== Honours ==
Barcelona

- La Liga: 2004–05, 2005–06
- Supercopa de España: 2005, 2006
- UEFA Champions League: 2005–06, 2008–09
