= Puigsou =

Mountain in Catalonia, Spain

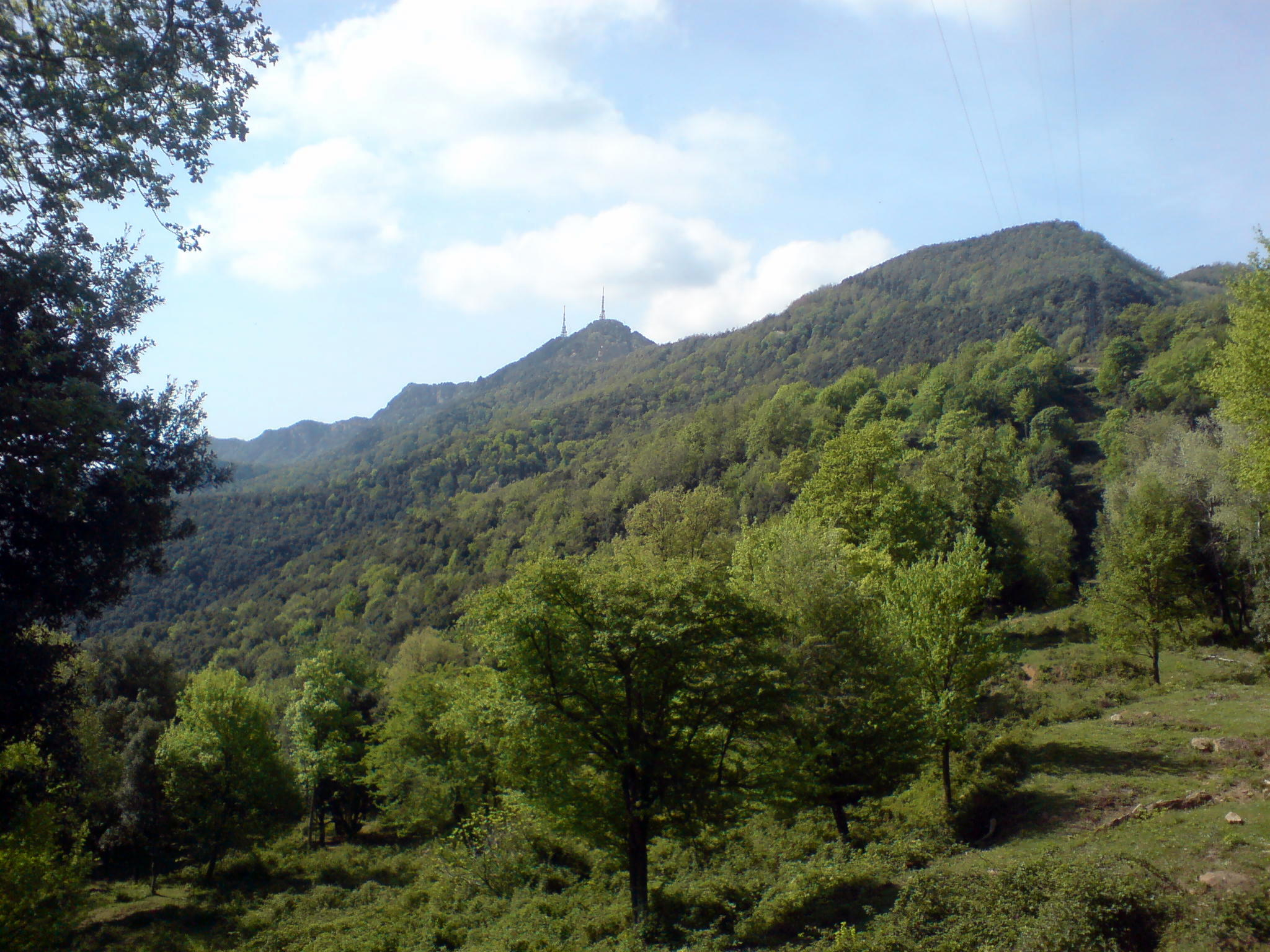

Highest point
- Elevation: 991 m (3,251 ft)
- Listing: Mountains in Catalonia
- Coordinates: 42°4′20.93″N 2°41′10.00″E

Geography
- Location: Catalonia, Spain

Puigsou is a mountain in Catalonia, Spain. At an elevation of 991 metres above sea level, it is the highest point in the comarca of Gironès. Located near the Santuari de la Mare de Déu de Rocacorba, it is part of the protected area of the mountains of Rocacorba. The mountain hosts several antennas for telecommunications and broadcasting, including television.

The road from Banyoles, 13.8 km long climbing 881m at an average of 6.5 percent, is often used by the many professional cyclists that reside in Girona.
