= Sarrià de Ter =

- Municipality
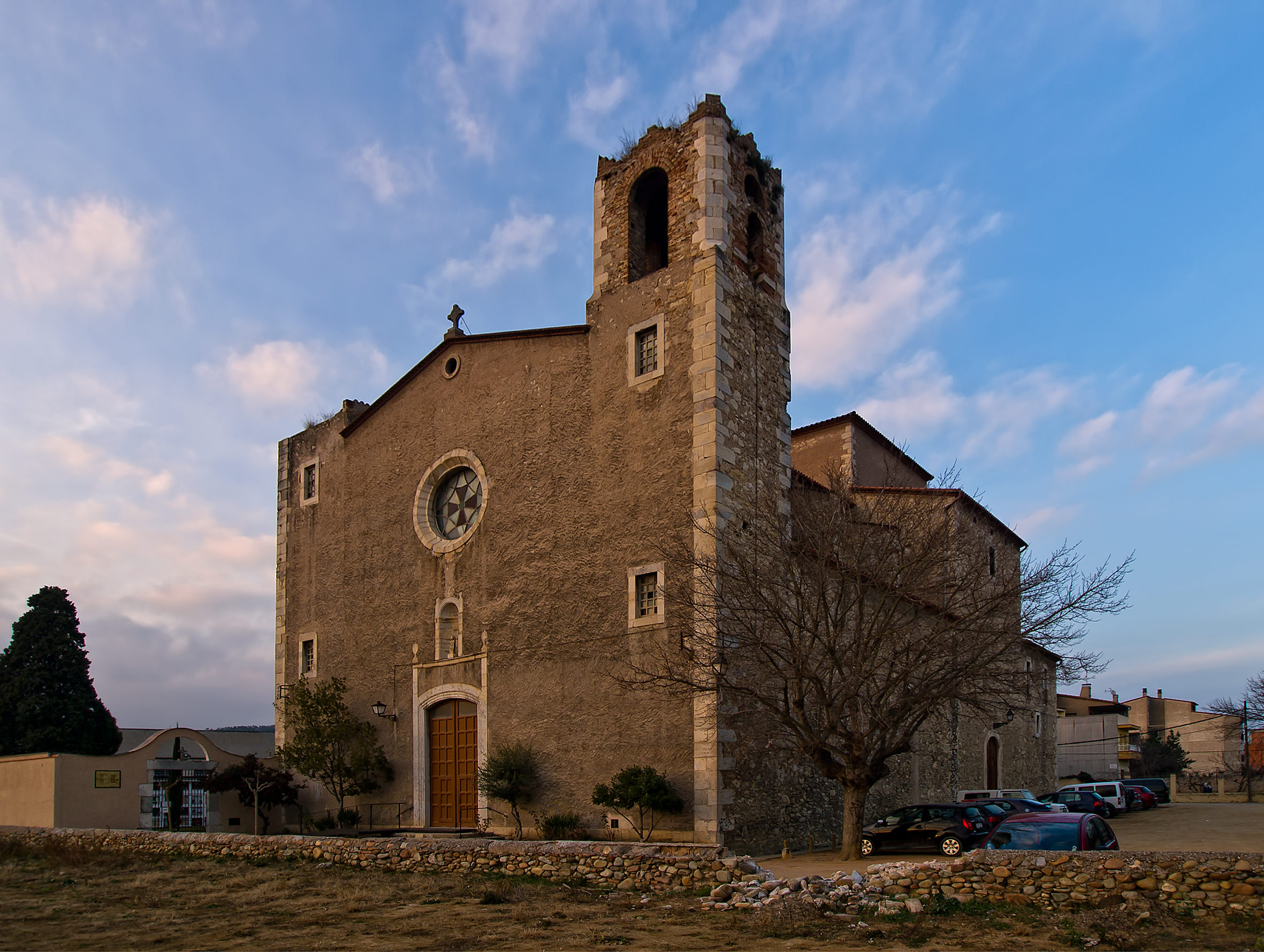
- Church

- Flag Coat of arms

- Location in Catalonia Sarrià de Ter (Catalonia) Sarrià de Ter (Spain)
- Coordinates: 42.014°N 2.818°E
- Country: Spain
- Community: Catalonia
- Province: Girona
- Comarca: Gironès

Government
  - Mayor: Narcís Fajula (ERC)

Area
  - Total: 4.2 km^{2} (1.6 sq mi)

Population (2025-01-01)
  - Total: 5,406
  - Density: 1,300/km^{2} (3,300/sq mi)
- Website: www.sarriadeter.cat

Sarrià de Ter (Catalan pronunciation: [səriˈa ðə ˈtɛɾ]) is a village in the province of Girona and autonomous community of Catalonia, Spain. It is part of the metropolitan area of the city of Girona.

Sarrià borders Sant Julià de Ramis to the north, Girona to the south and east, and Sant Gregori to the west. Its territory occupies slightly more than four square kilometers. As of 2015, Sarrià de Ter had a population of 4,973.

In 1976, Sarrià was formally annexed to the neighboring city of Girona. In 1979, with the return to democratic municipal government across Spain after the end of the Francoist State, Sarrià de Ter regained its status as an independent municipality.
