= Sant Andreu Salou =

- Municipality
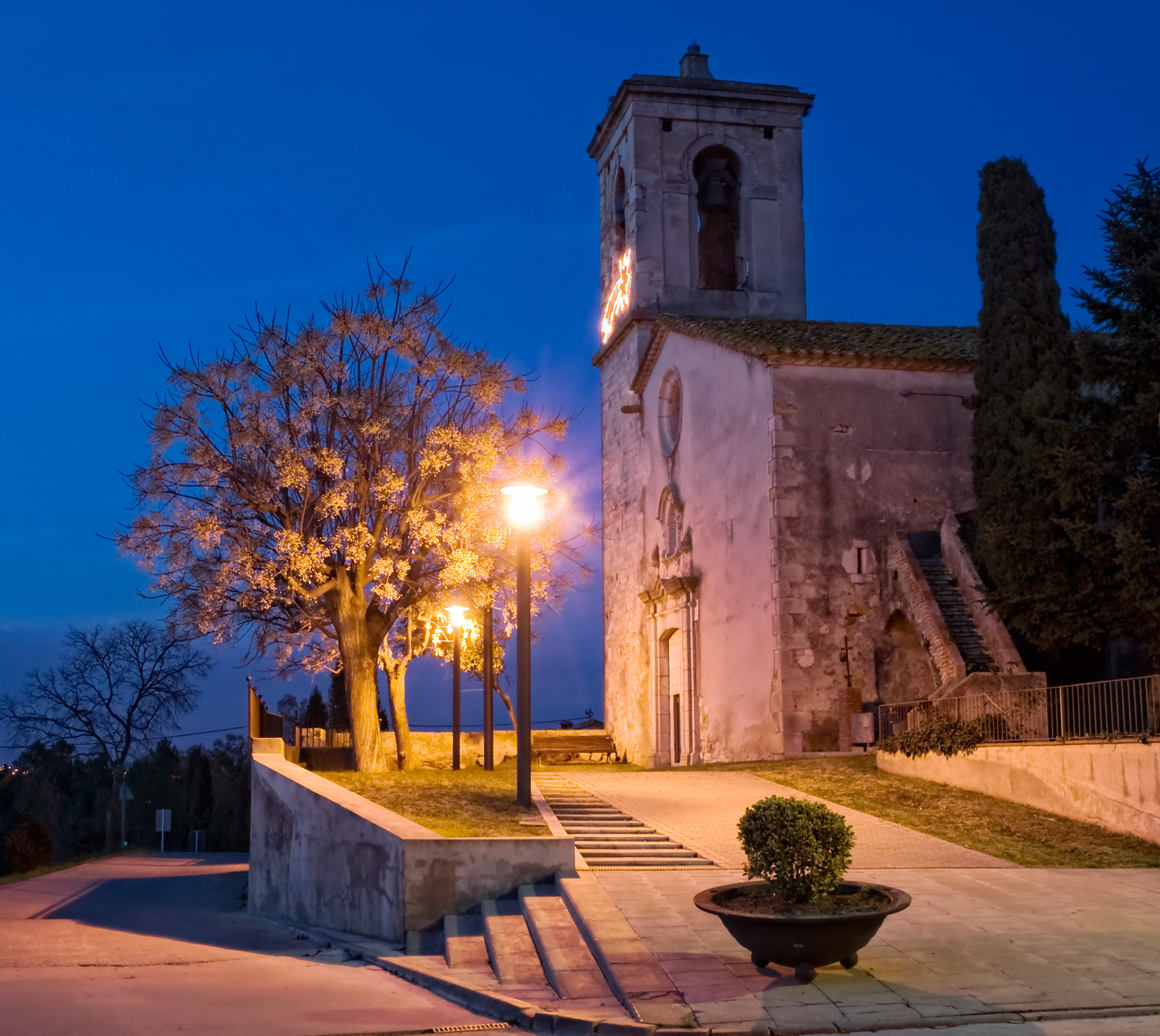
- Parish church

- Coat of arms

- Location in Catalonia Sant Andreu Salou (Spain)
- Coordinates: 41°52′30″N 2°49′36″E
- Country: Spain
- Community: Catalonia
- Province: Girona
- Comarca: Gironès

Government
  - Mayor: Francesc Xavier Casanovas Busquets (2015)

Area
  - Total: 6.0 km^{2} (2.3 sq mi)

Population (2025-01-01)
  - Total: 161
  - Density: 27/km^{2} (69/sq mi)
- Website: www.santandreusalou.cat

Sant Andreu Salou (Catalan pronunciation: [ˈsant ənˈdɾew səˈlɔw]) is a village in the province of Girona and autonomous community of Catalonia, Spain. The municipality covers an area of 5.98 square kilometres (2.31 sq mi) and the population in 2014 was 155.
