= Sant Feliu de Guíxols–Girona railway =

Former narrow gauge railway line in Catalonia, Spain

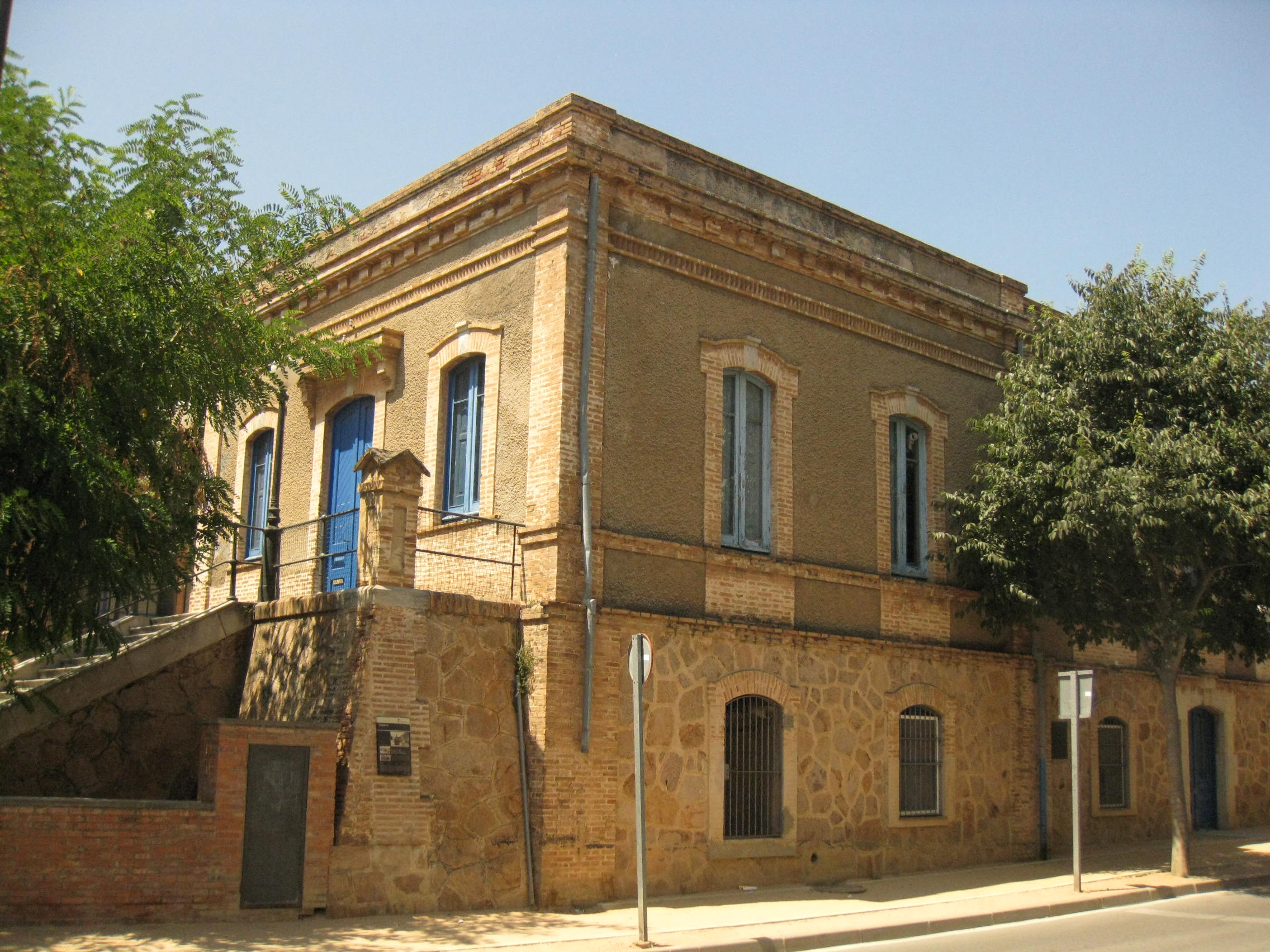
- The line's former terminus in Sant Feliu de Guíxols

Overview
- Status: Dismantled
- Locale: Province of Girona, Catalonia, Spain

History
- Opened: 1892
- Closed: 1969

Technical
- Line length: 42 kilometres (26 mi)
- Number of tracks: 1
- Track gauge: 750 mm (2 ft 5 1/2 in)

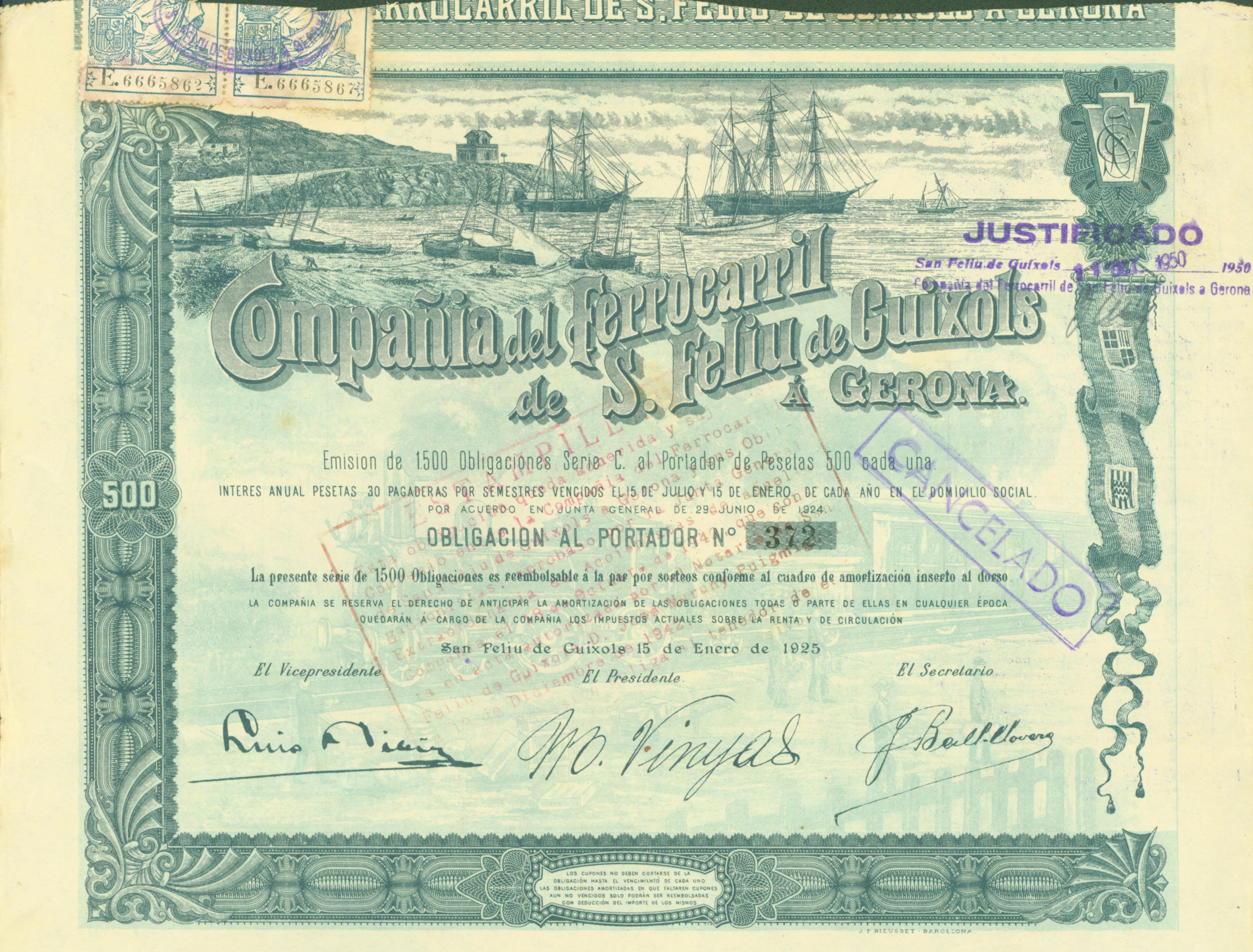
Bond of the Sant Feliu de Guíxols–Girona railway company, issued 15 January 1925

The Sant Feliu de Guíxols to Girona Railway was a 750 mm (2 ft 5 1/2 in) gauge railway line that operated over 42 kilometres (26 mi) of track between Girona and Sant Feliu de Guíxols, in Catalonia, Spain. The railway had 6 steam locomotives of the 0-6-2T type, 21 passenger cars and 106 freight cars.

The line opened in 1892, starting from a station in the centre of Sant Feliu de Guíxols, running via Castell d'Aro, Santa Cristina d'Aro, Llagostera, Cassà de la Selva, Llambilles, Quart, and terminating at Girona railway station, where a connection was made with the Barcelona–Cerbère railway. In 1924, a freight-only branch was constructed linking the terminus in Sant Feliù de Guíxols with the town's commercial port.

By the 1960s the line was struggling financially, and in 1963 it was taken over by the state-owned Ferrocarriles Españoles de Vía Estrecha (FEVE). They had plans to convert it to metre gauge and link it to the Olot–Girona railway, but nothing came of this and it was closed in 1969. It has since been converted into a greenway (via verde) linking Sant Feliu de Guíxols and Girona.
