= Viladasens =

- Municipality
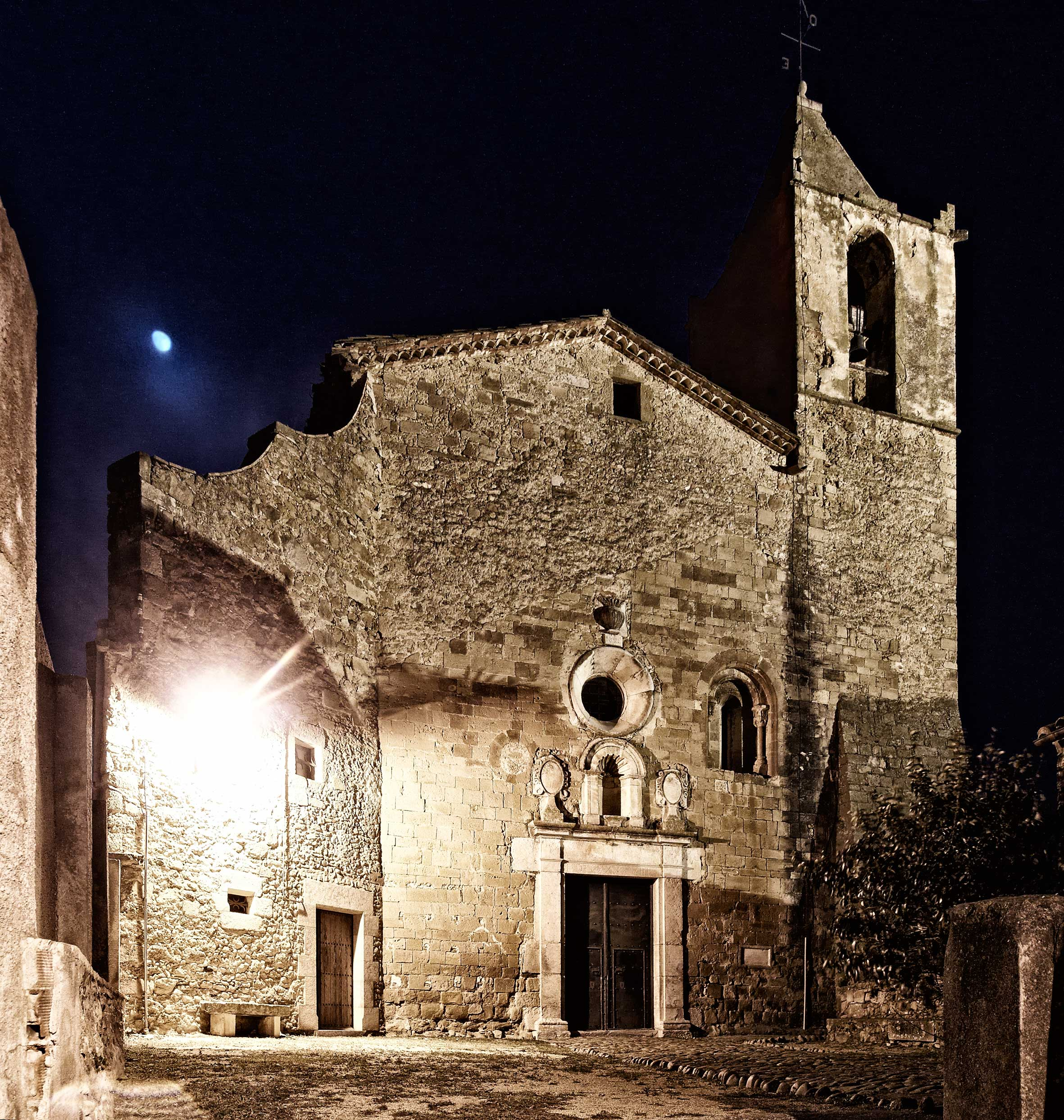
- St. Vincent's church, Viladasens

- Flag Coat of arms

- Location in Catalonia Viladasens (Spain)
- Coordinates: 42°5′49″N 2°55′54″E
- Country: Spain
- Community: Catalonia
- Province: Girona
- Comarca: Gironès

Government
  - Mayor: Josep Massó Masos (2015)

Area
  - Total: 15.7 km^{2} (6.1 sq mi)

Population (2025-01-01)
  - Total: 206
  - Density: 13.1/km^{2} (34.0/sq mi)
- Website: www.viladasens.org

Viladasens (Catalan pronunciation: [ˌbiləðəˈzɛns]) is a village in the province of Girona and autonomous community of Catalonia, Spain.

== History ==
The first document is Viladasens the year 1058, under the name: VILLAMAR DEASINIS. Viladasens And for settlement in the Iberian period, as shown by the findings made in the hillside of the well of the ice and especially in the Cross Fellini, where during the construction of a highway, six huts which were a small center of ceramic production from the 3rd century BC. In Roman times the Via Augusta went through the town. On the plain to the east of town, a building has been identified that could correspond to the Roman mansion (next to the hostel through) of Cinniana, which gave name to the river Cinyana. In the 11th century the parishes of Viladasens and Fellini were already established, as shown in the documents of the respective churches with Romanesque elements. It has news of a series of houses (the Blackberry, can strip, the Adroit ca ...) to prove a major expansion of agriculture in medieval times. The two parishes also formed a royal bailiwick domain that was for almost all medieval and modern.

Viladasens has been a rural municipality for almost all of its history: the 18th century experienced some growth, from 250 inhabitants in 1718 to 404 in 1787, which remained without much change until the mid-20th century. Since then, changes in agriculture led to the abandonment of the activity of many houses and the population fell by half: 357 residents in 1960 came under the 189 in 1981. Over the two decades the maintenance of some farms were showing adaptation.

Thus, despite the changes that have been around, Viladasens has reached the 21st century while maintaining a rural appearance without sacrificing the benefits of technical progress.

== Attractions ==
- Parish Church of St. Vincent (religious temple)
- Church of St. Martin of Fellini (religious temple)
- Church of San Martin de la Mora (religious temple)
- Balaguer Viladasens and Fellini (Buildings Civil)

== Celebrities ==
Antonio Machado spent his last night in Spain at Mas Faixat in Viladasens on January 26, 1939, before crossing the border to France the next day.

== Economy ==
Rainfed agriculture and livestock.
