= Juià =

- Municipality
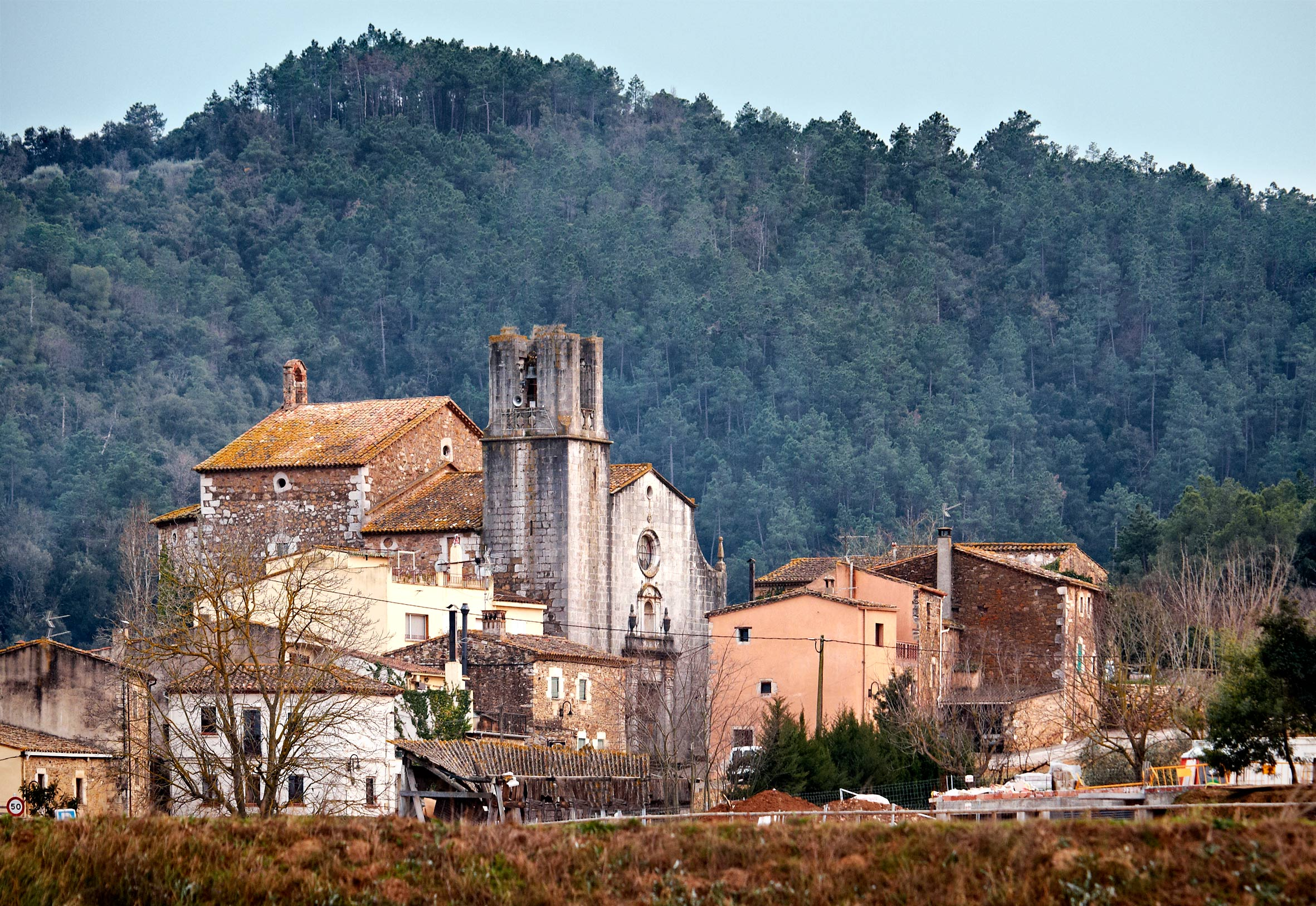
- Juià

- Flag Coat of arms

- Location in Catalonia Juià (Spain)
- Coordinates: 42°1′9″N 2°54′30″E
- Country: Spain
- Community: Catalonia
- Province: Girona
- Comarca: Gironès

Government
  - Mayor: Josep Vidal Mias (2015)

Area
  - Total: 8.4 km^{2} (3.2 sq mi)

Population (2025-01-01)
  - Total: 319
  - Density: 38/km^{2} (98/sq mi)
- Website: www.juia.cat

Juià (Catalan pronunciation: [ʒuˈja]) is a village in the province of Girona and autonomous community of Catalonia, Spain. The municipality covers an area of 8.39 square kilometres (3.24 sq mi) and the population in 2014 was 340.
