= Madremanya =

- Municipality
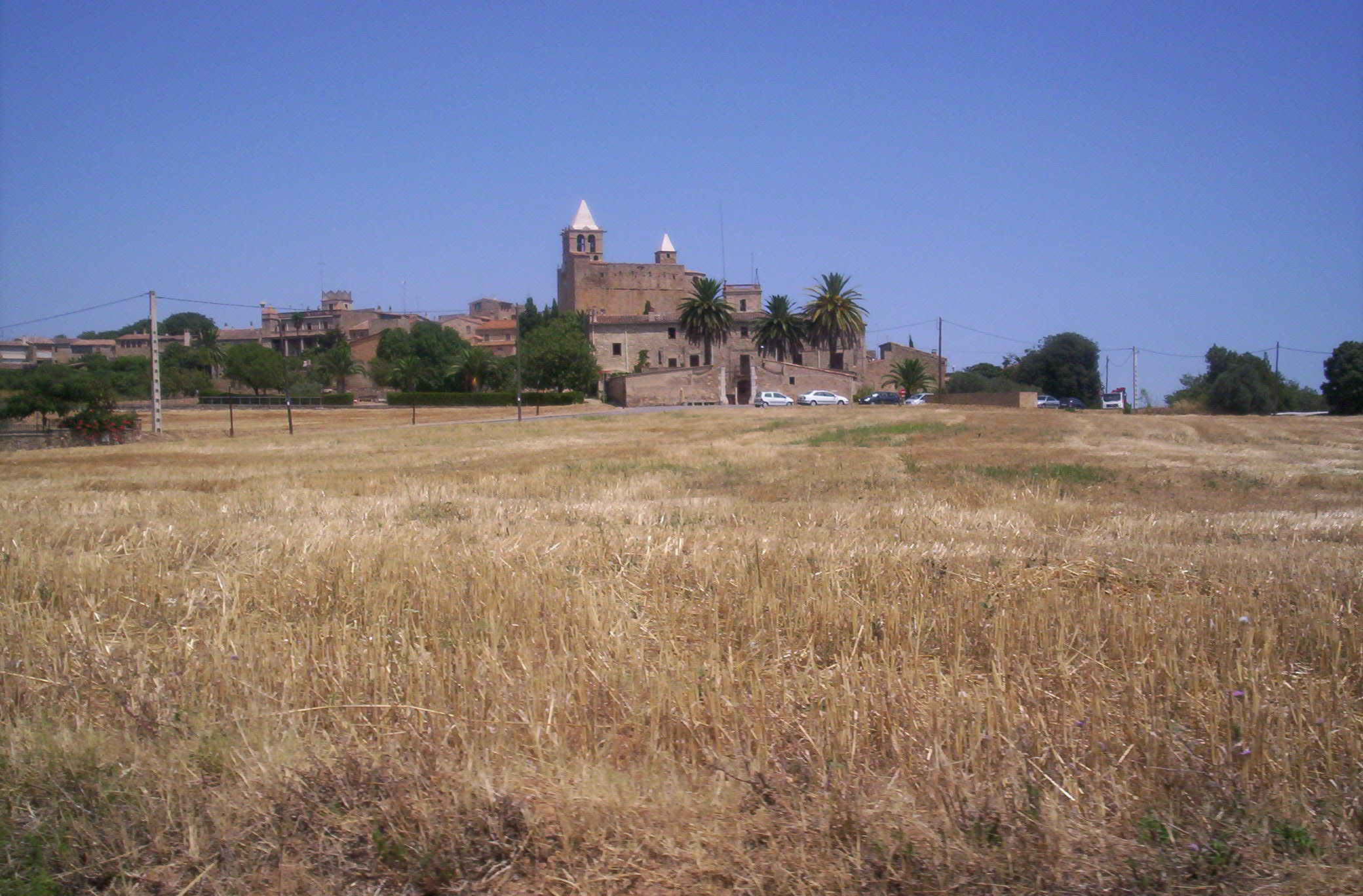
- A view of the village of Madremanya

- Flag Coat of arms

- Location in Catalonia Madremanya (Spain)
- Coordinates: 41.99°N 2.957°E
- Country: Spain
- Community: Catalonia
- Province: Girona
- Comarca: Gironès

Government
  - Mayor: Albert Peracaula Boschsacoma (2015)

Area
  - Total: 13.7 km^{2} (5.3 sq mi)

Population (2025-01-01)
  - Total: 280
  - Density: 20/km^{2} (53/sq mi)
- Website: www.madremanya.cat

Madremanya (Catalan pronunciation: [məðɾəˈmaɲə]) is a village in the province of Girona and autonomous community of Catalonia, Spain. The municipality covers an area of 13.7 square kilometres (5.3 sq mi) and the population in 2014 was 283.
