= Sant Martí de Llémena =

- Municipality
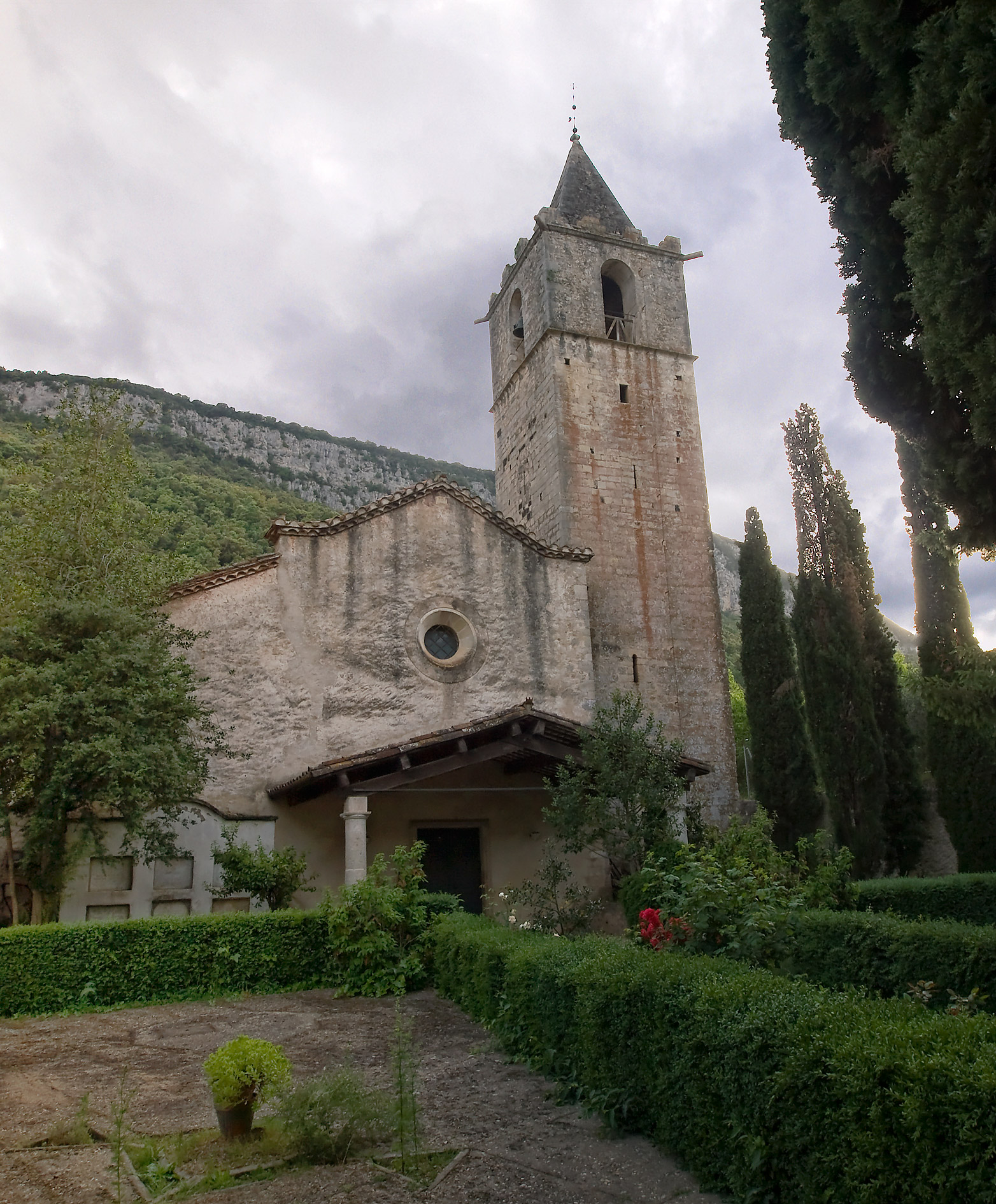
- Church of Sant Martí de Llémena

- Flag Coat of arms

- Location in Catalonia
- Coordinates: 42°2′17″N 2°38′56″E
- Country: Spain
- Community: Catalonia
- Province: Girona
- Comarca: Gironès

Government
  - mayor: Jaume Busquets Arnau (2015)

Area
  - Total: 43.1 km^{2} (16.6 sq mi)
- Elevation: 256 m (840 ft)

Population (2025-01-01)
  - Total: 726
  - Density: 16.8/km^{2} (43.6/sq mi)
- Postal code: 17172
- Website: www.smartillemena.cat

Sant Martí de Llémena (Catalan pronunciation: [ˈsam məɾˈti ðə ˈʎemənə]) is a municipality in the comarca of Gironès in Catalonia, Spain.

== Villages ==
- Granollers de Rocacorba, 63
- Llorà, 343
- Sant Martí de Llémena, 83
- Les Serres, 20
