= Llagostera =

- Municipality
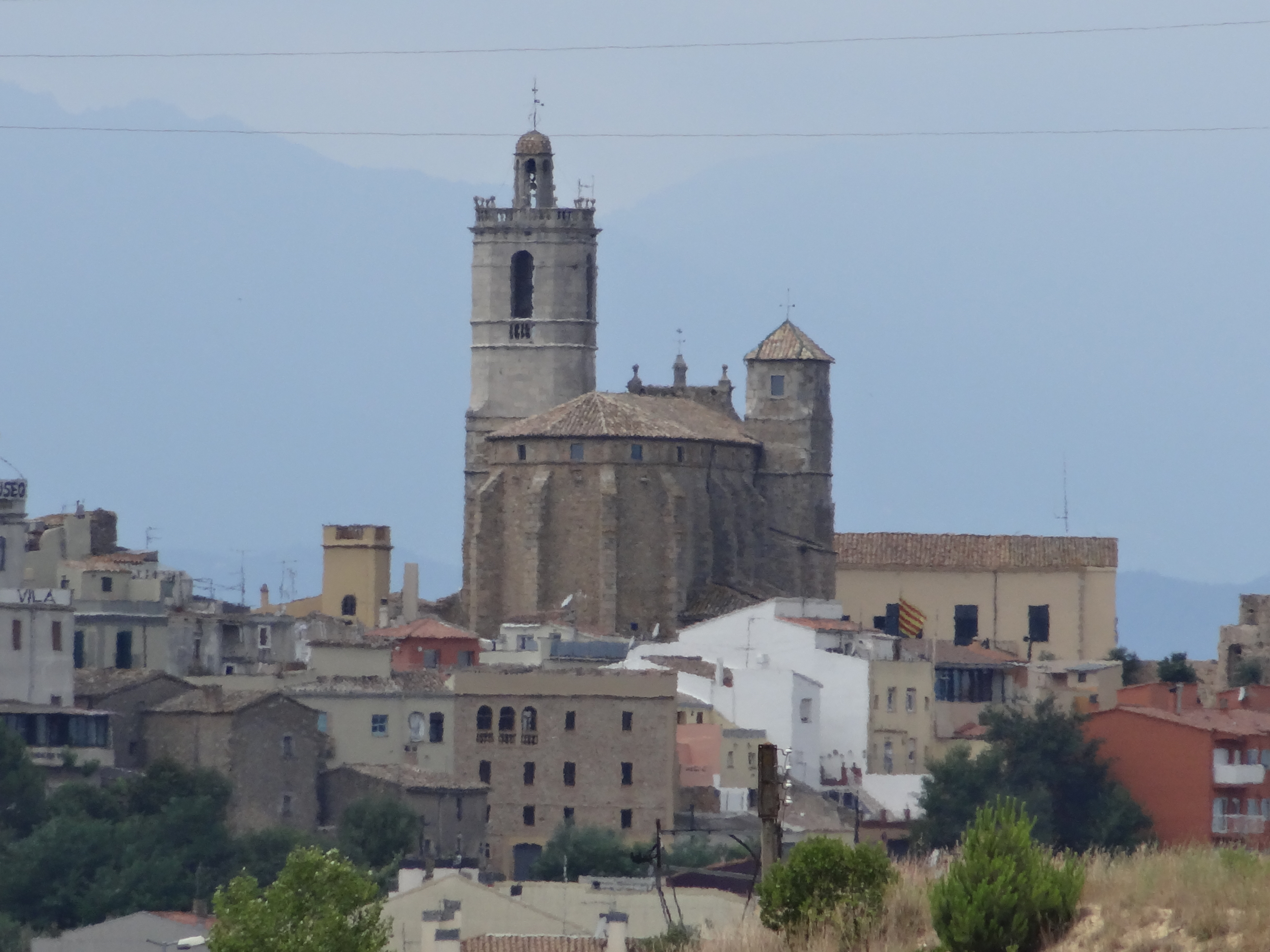
- Llagostera, with St. Felix's church

- Flag Coat of arms

- Location in Catalonia Llagostera (Spain)
- Coordinates: 41°49′45″N 2°53′36″E
- Country: Spain
- Community: Catalonia
- Province: Girona
- Comarca: Gironès

Government
  - Mayor: Narcís Llinàs i Gavilan (Junts per Llagostera)

Area
  - Total: 76.4 km^{2} (29.5 sq mi)
- Elevation: 160 m (520 ft)

Population (2025-01-01)
  - Total: 9,585
  - Density: 125/km^{2} (325/sq mi)
- Demonym(s): Llagosterenc, Llagosterenca
- Postal code: 17240
- Website: llagostera.cat

Llagostera (Catalan pronunciation: [ʎəɣusˈteɾə]) is a municipality in the comarca of the Gironès in Catalonia, Spain. During the 20th century, it was known for the production of cork and derived articles. It is located 20 km south of Girona and 15 km west from the Mediterranean Sea.

Between 1892 and 1969, Llagostera was connected to the city of Girona and the port of Sant Feliu de Guíxols by the narrow gauge Sant Feliu de Guíxols–Girona railway. The line has since been converted into a greenway.

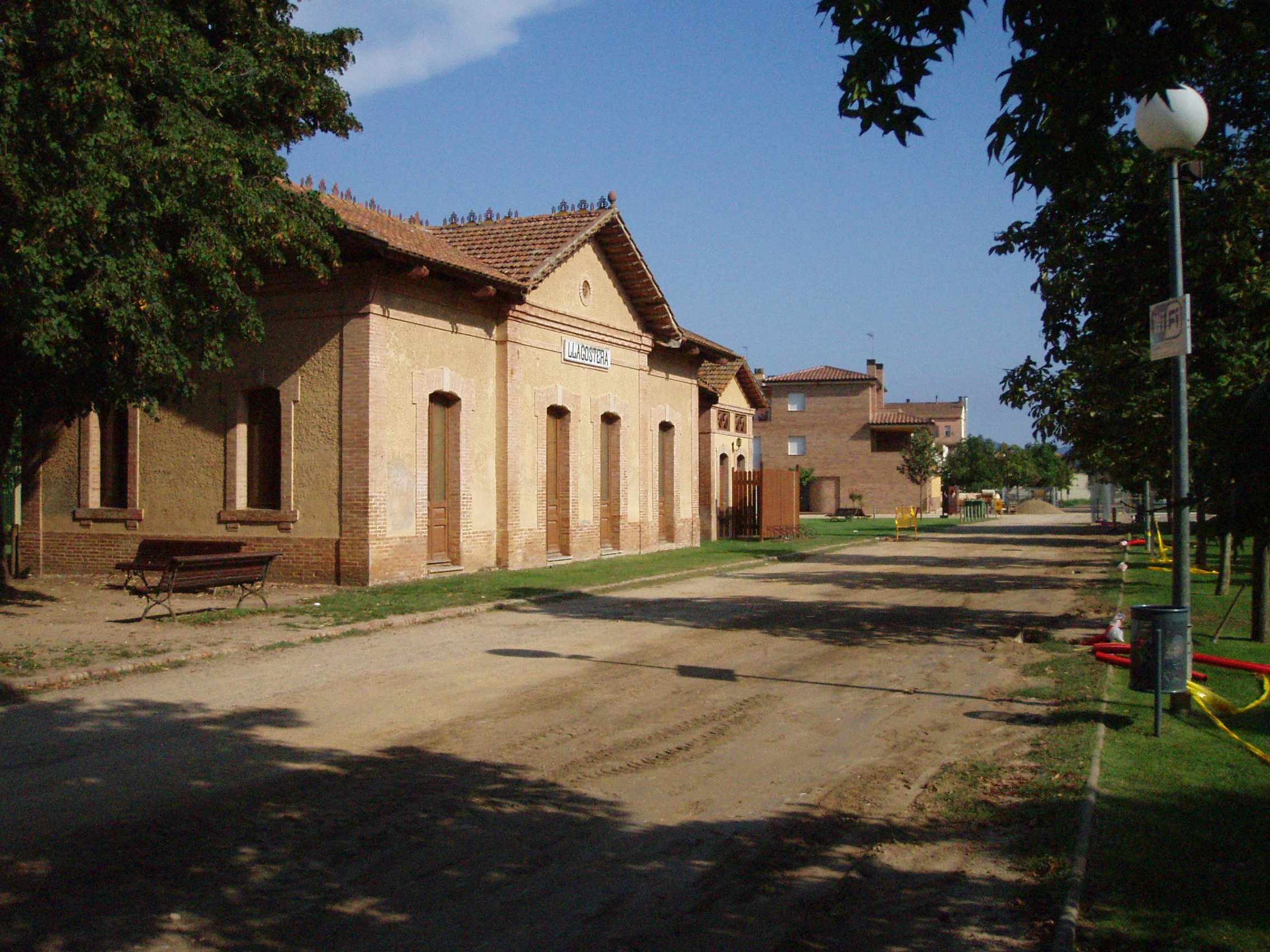
Old railway station

== Demography ==
1900	1930	1950	1970	1986	2009
4140	4090	3812	4464	5119	7764

== Sports ==
Llagostera is the smallest town ever to have a team in the top two divisions of Spanish football, UE Llagostera. They won the 2020 Copa Federación de España.

== Bibliography ==
- Panareda Clopés, Josep Maria; Rios Calvet, Jaume; Rabella Vives, Josep Maria (1989). Guia de Catalunya, Barcelona: Caixa de Catalunya. ISBN 84-87135-01-3 (Spanish). ISBN 84-87135-02-1 (Catalan).
