= Cervià de Ter =

- Municipality
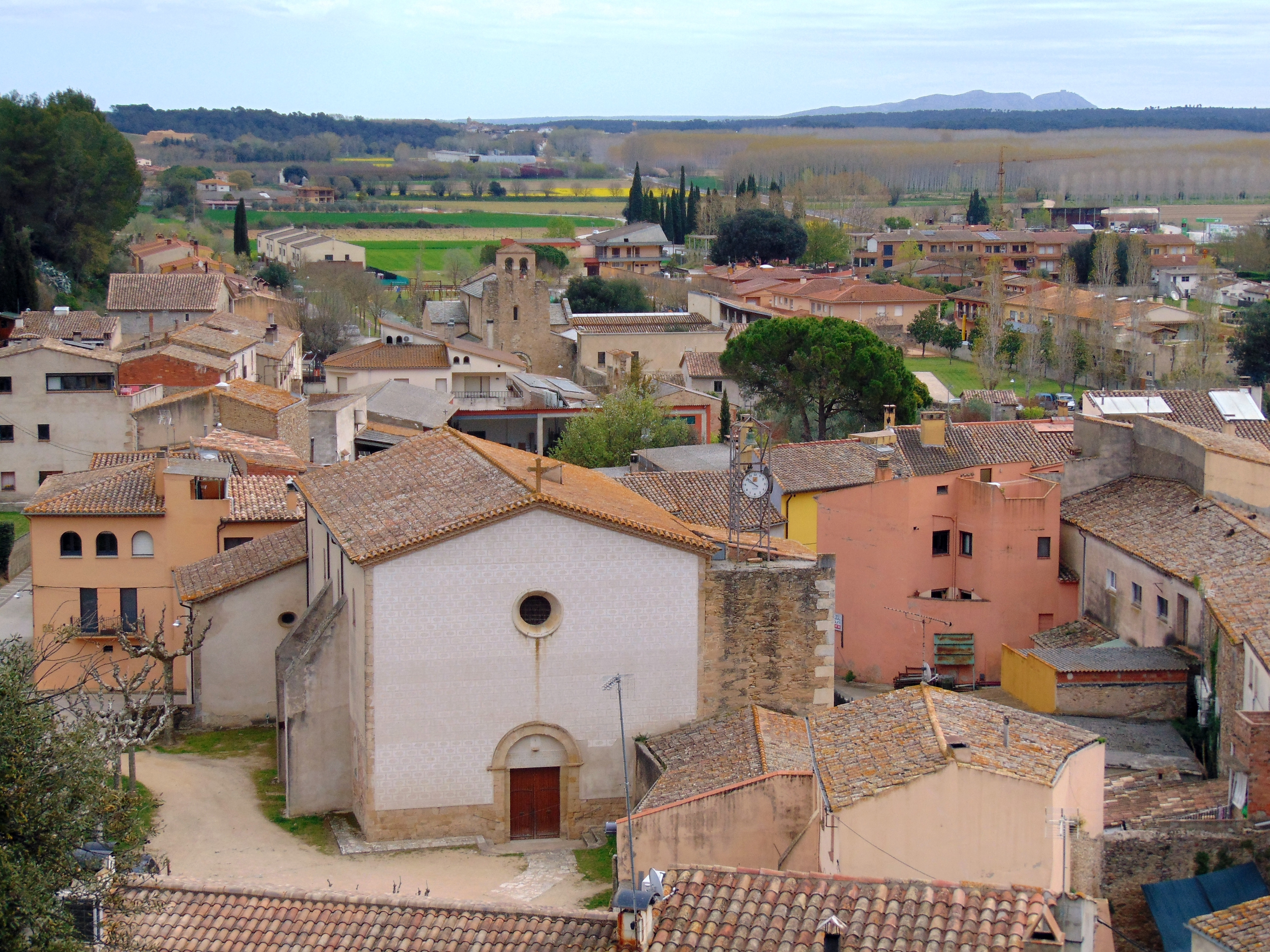

- Coat of arms

- Location in Catalonia Cervià de Ter (Spain)
- Coordinates: 42°4′N 2°55′E
- Country: Spain
- Community: Catalonia
- Province: Girona
- Comarca: Gironès

Government
  - Mayor: Roser Estañol Torrent (2015)

Area
  - Total: 9.9 km^{2} (3.8 sq mi)

Population (2025-01-01)
  - Total: 1,029
  - Density: 100/km^{2} (270/sq mi)
- Website: cerviadeter.cat

Cervià de Ter (Catalan pronunciation: [səɾβiˈa ðə ˈtɛɾ]) is a village in the province of Girona and autonomous community of Catalonia, Spain. The municipality covers an area of 9.97 square kilometres (3.85 sq mi) and the population in 2014 was 934.
