= Sant Joan de Mollet =

- Municipality
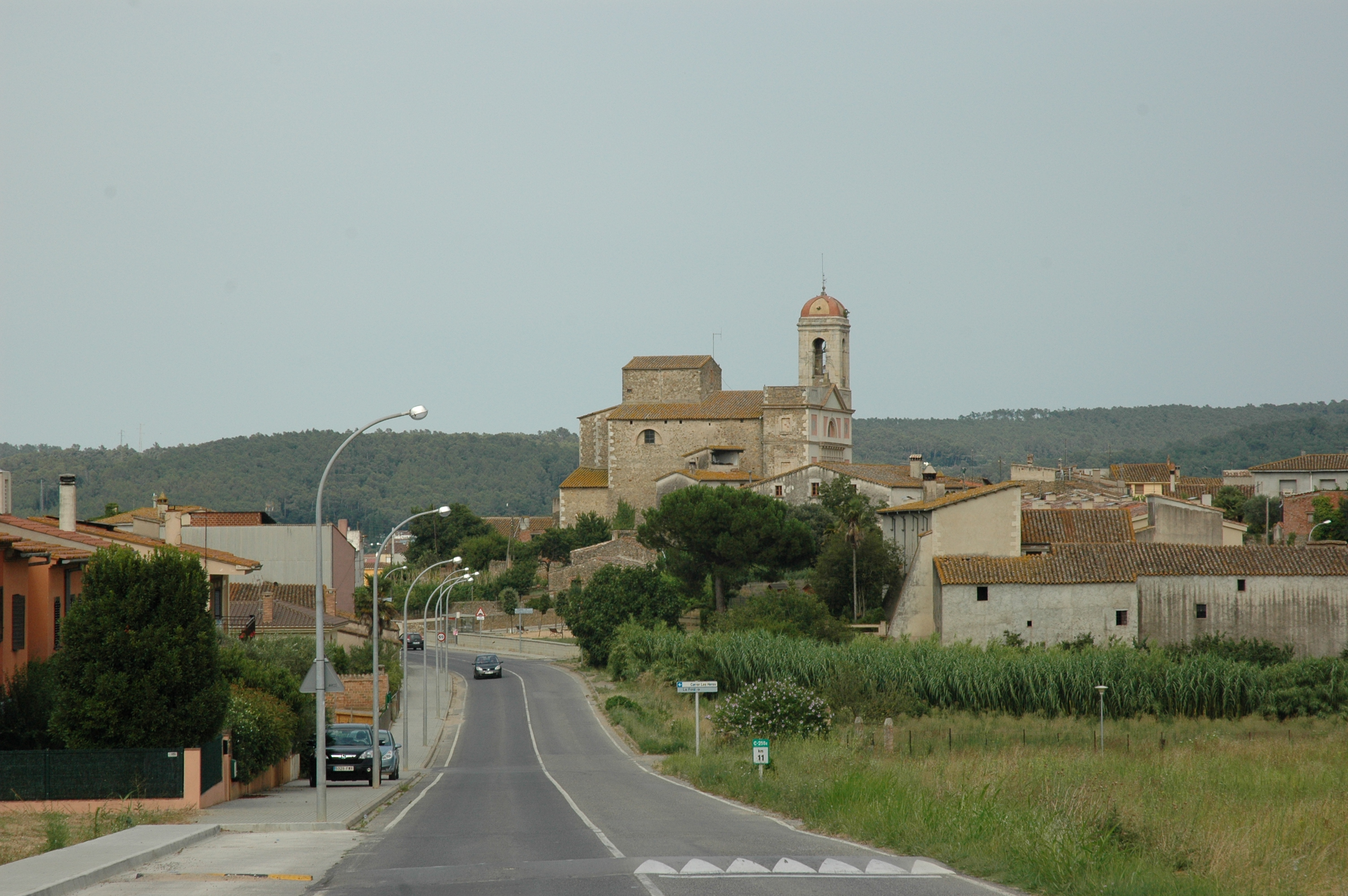

- Location in Catalonia Sant Joan de Mollet (Spain)
- Coordinates: 42.044°N 2.941°E
- Country: Spain
- Community: Catalonia
- Province: Girona
- Comarca: Gironès

Government
  - Mayor: Sergi López Serrat (2023)

Area
  - Total: 3.2 km^{2} (1.2 sq mi)

Population (2025-01-01)
  - Total: 536
  - Density: 170/km^{2} (430/sq mi)
- Website: www.santjoandemollet.cat

Sant Joan de Mollet (Catalan pronunciation: [ˈsaɲ ʒuˈan də muˈʎɛt]) is a village in the province of Girona and autonomous community of Catalonia, Spain. The municipality covers an area of 3.16 square kilometres (1.22 sq mi) and the population in 2014 was 509.
