= Quart, Spain =

Quart
- Municipality
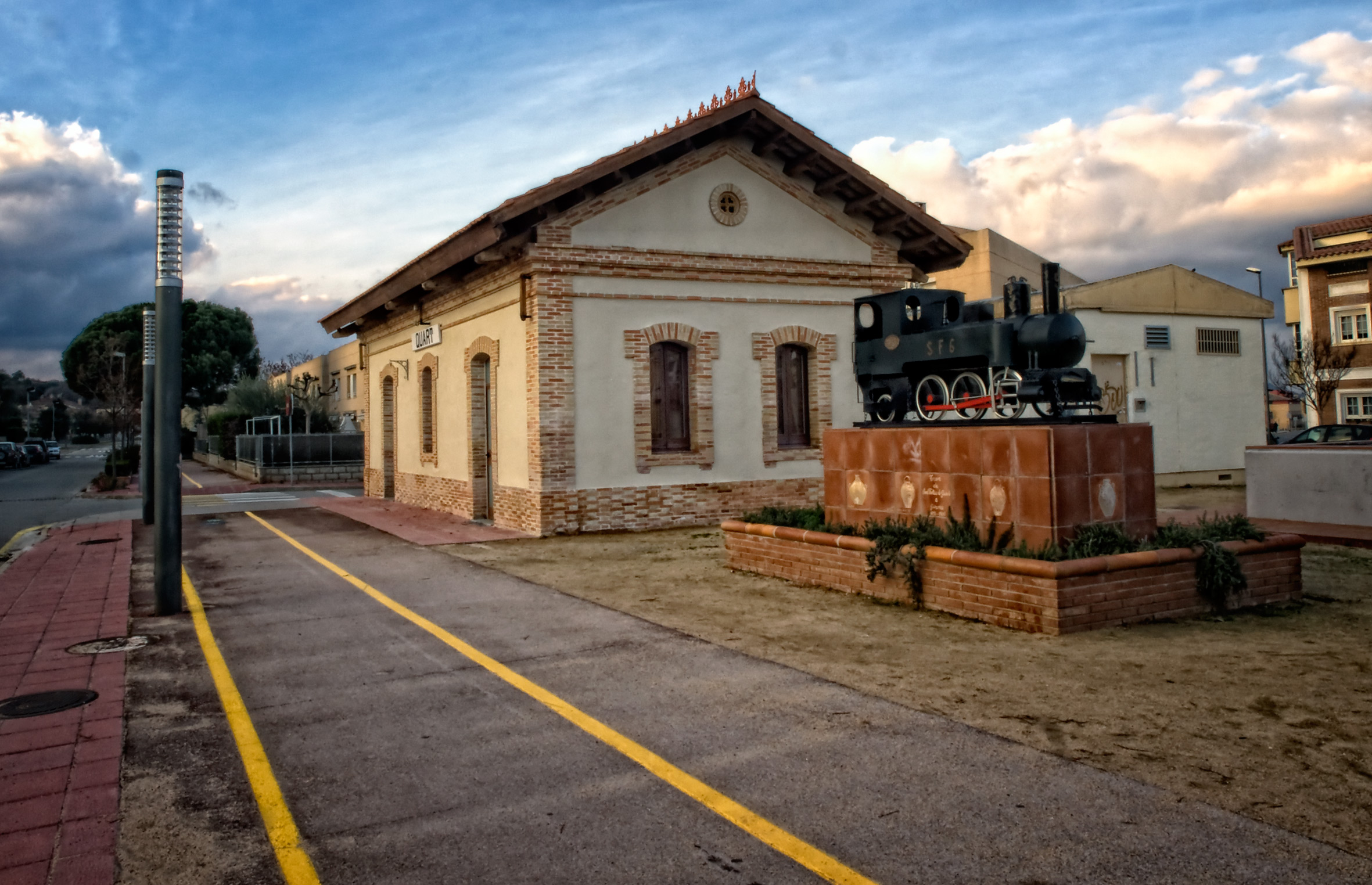
- Train station, Quart

- Coat of arms

- Location in Catalonia Quart (Spain)
- Coordinates: 41°56′N 2°50′E
- Country: Spain
- Community: Catalonia
- Province: Girona
- Comarca: Gironès

Government
  - Mayor: Pere Cabarrocas Sitges (2015)

Area
  - Total: 38.1 km^{2} (14.7 sq mi)

Population (2025-01-01)
  - Total: 4,165
  - Density: 109/km^{2} (283/sq mi)
- Website: www.quart.cat

Quart (Catalan pronunciation: [ˈkwaɾt]) is a village in the province of Girona and autonomous community of Catalonia, Spain. The municipality covers an area of 38.1 square kilometres (14.7 sq mi) and the population in 2014 was 3,441.

Between 1892 and 1969, the village was connected to the city of Girona and the port of Sant Feliu de Guíxols by the narrow gauge Sant Feliu de Guíxols–Girona railway. The line has since been converted into a greenway.
