= Sant Jordi Desvalls =

- Municipality
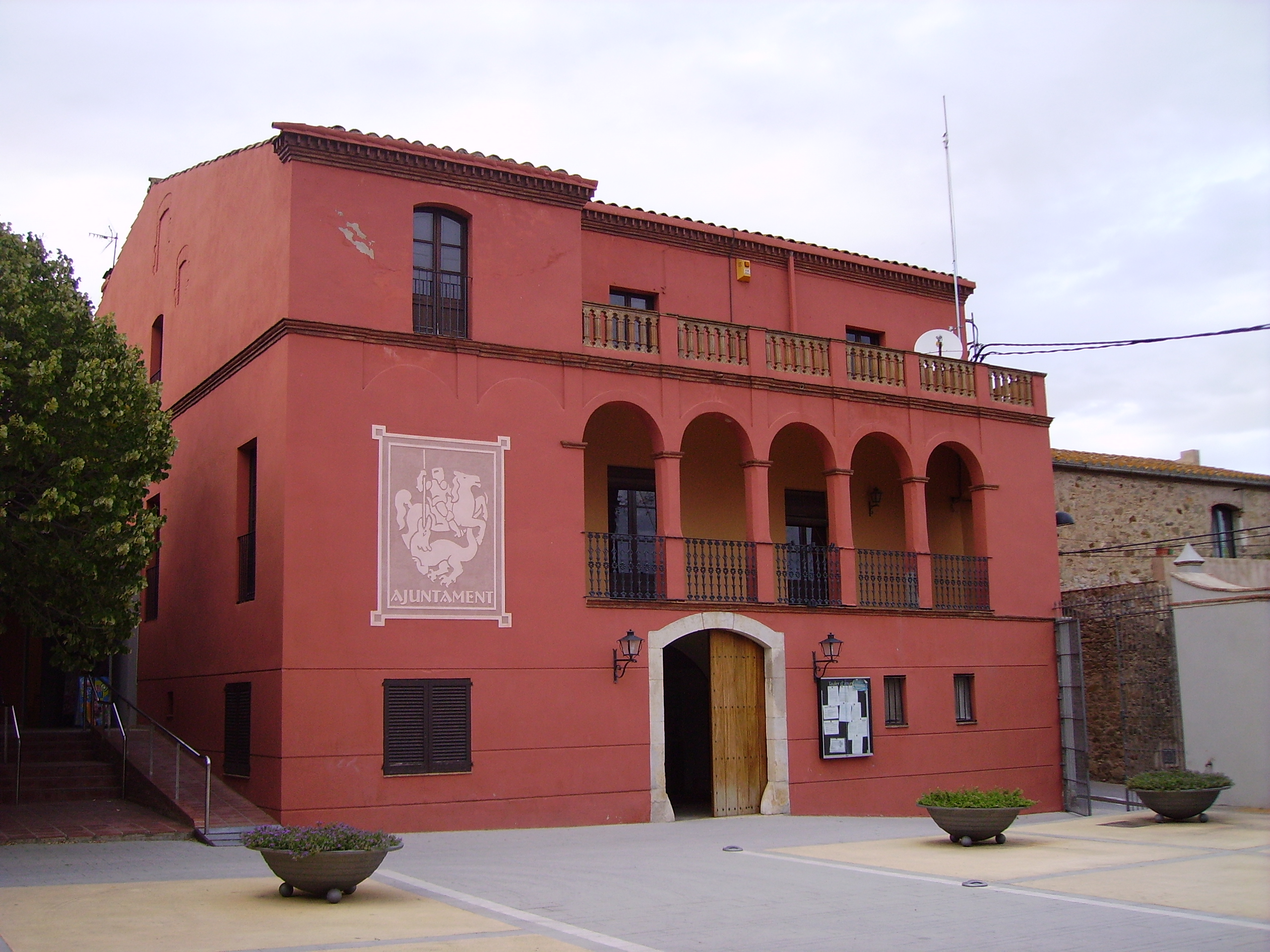
- Town hall

- Coat of arms

- Location in Catalonia Sant Jordi Desvalls (Spain)
- Coordinates: 42.071°N 2.953°E
- Country: Spain
- Community: Catalonia
- Province: Girona
- Comarca: Gironès

Government
  - Mayor: Josep Aulet Aleñà (2015)

Area
  - Total: 11.7 km^{2} (4.5 sq mi)

Population (2025-01-01)
  - Total: 880
  - Density: 75/km^{2} (190/sq mi)
- Website: www.santjordidesvalls.cat

Sant Jordi Desvalls (Old Catalan for 'Saint George of the Valleys'; Catalan pronunciation: [ˈsaɲ ˈʒɔɾði ðəzˈβaʎs]) is a village in the province of Girona and autonomous community of Catalonia, Spain. The municipality covers an area of 11.63 square kilometres (4.49 sq mi) and the population in 2014 was 708.
