= Canet d'Adri =

- Municipality
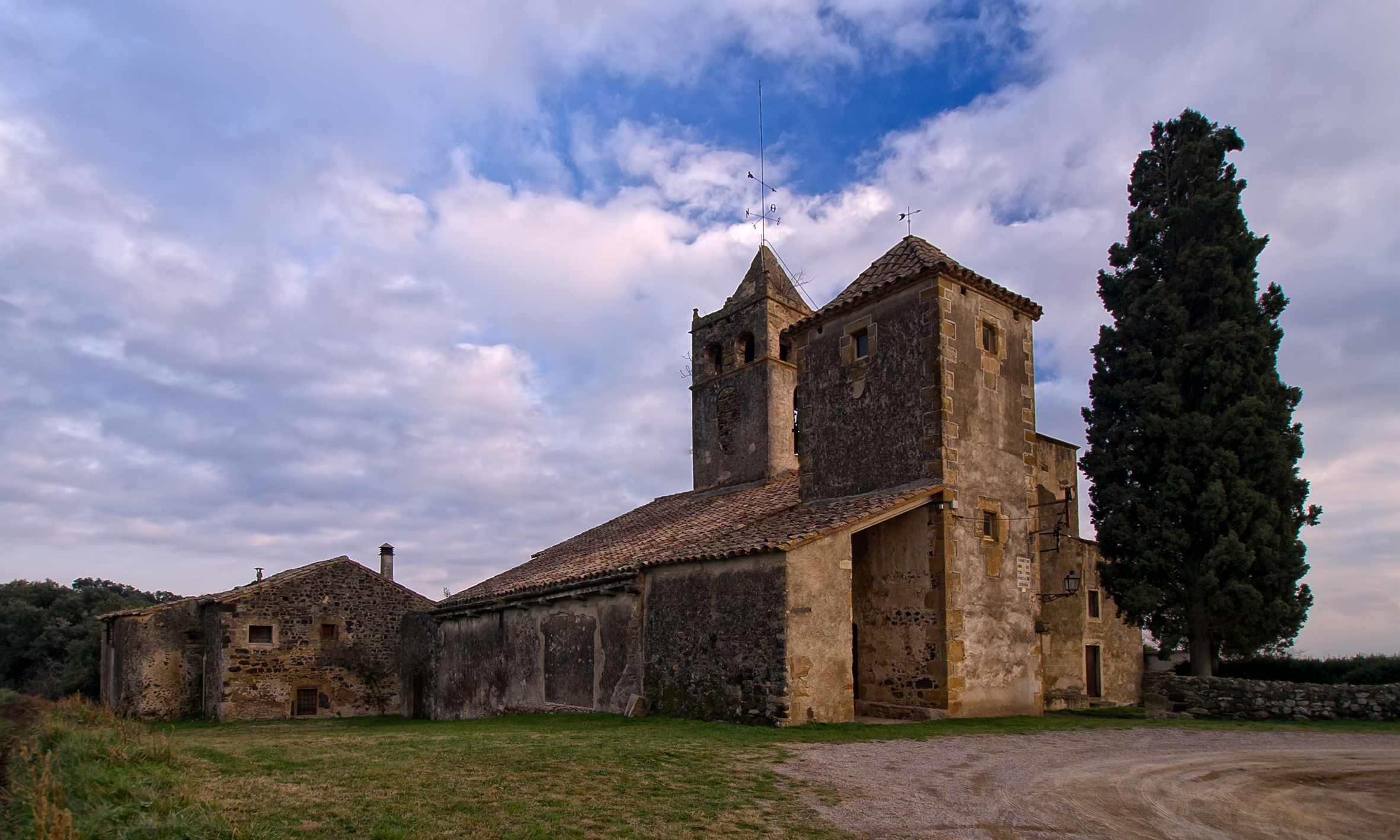
- St. Vincent's church, Canet d'Adri

- Flag Coat of arms

- Location in Catalonia Canet d'Adri (Spain)
- Coordinates: 42°2′11″N 2°44′18″E
- Country: Spain
- Community: Catalonia
- Province: Girona
- Comarca: Gironès

Government
  - Mayor: Carles Espígol Camps (2015)

Area
  - Total: 44.4 km^{2} (17.1 sq mi)

Population (2014)
  - Total: 644
  - Density: 14.5/km^{2} (37.6/sq mi)
- Website: www.canet-adri.cat

Canet d'Adri (Catalan pronunciation: [kəˈnɛd ˈdaðɾi]) is a village in the province of Girona and autonomous community of Catalonia, Spain. The municipality covers an area of 44.30 square kilometres (17.10 sq mi) and the population in 2014 was 644.
