= Cassà de la Selva =

- Municipality
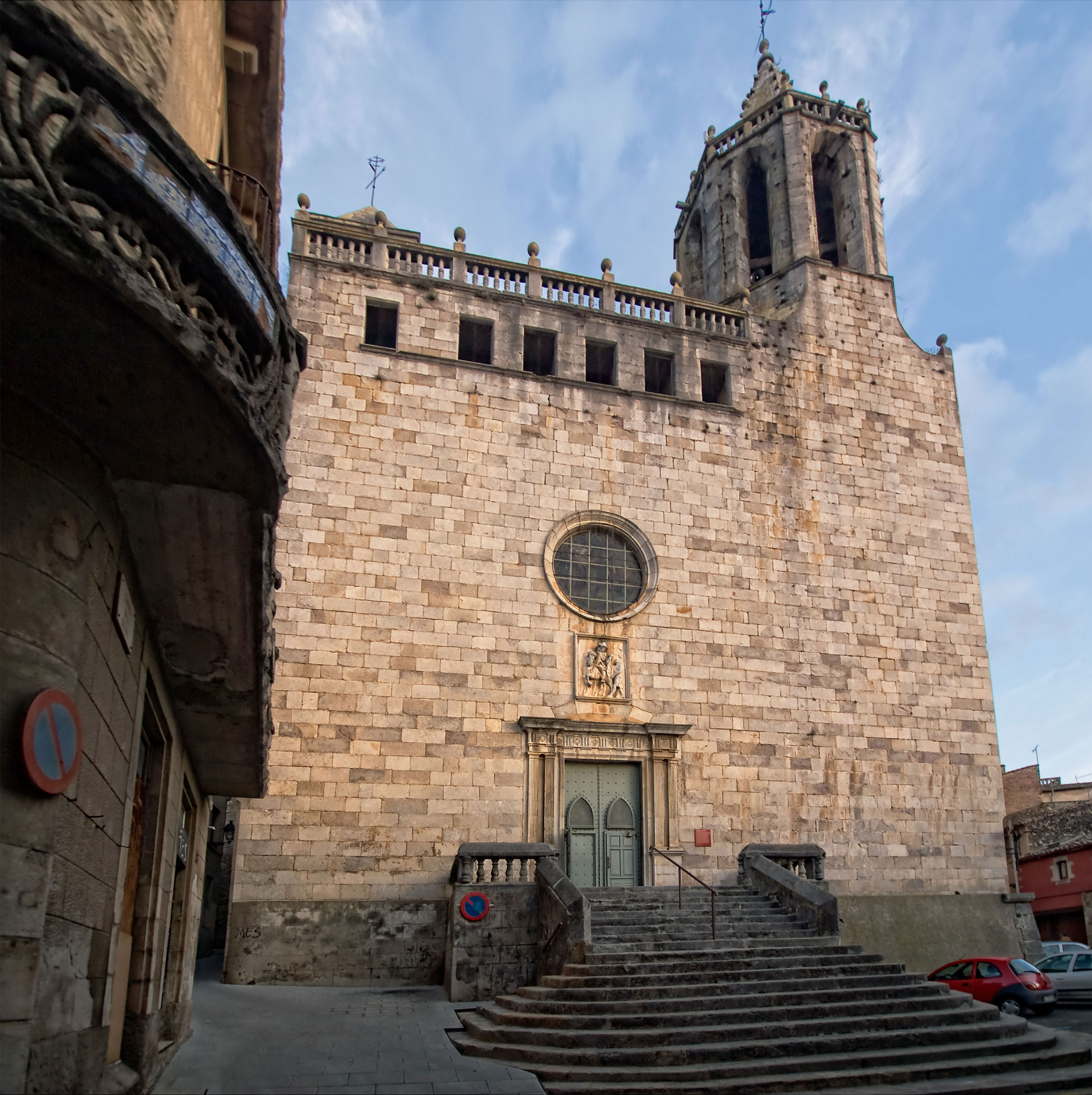
- St. Martin's parish church, Cassà de la Selva

- Coat of arms

- Location in Catalonia Cassà de la Selva (Spain)
- Coordinates: 41°53′21″N 2°52′38″E
- Country: Spain
- Community: Catalonia
- Province: Girona
- Comarca: Gironès

Government
  - Mayor: Martí Vallès Prats (2015)

Area
  - Total: 45.2 km^{2} (17.5 sq mi)
- Elevation: 137 m (449 ft)

Population (2025-01-01)
  - Total: 11,131
  - Density: 246/km^{2} (638/sq mi)
- Demonym(s): Cassanenc, cassanenca
- Website: www.cassa.cat

Cassà de la Selva (Catalan pronunciation: [kəˈsa ðə lə ˈsɛlβə]) is a municipality in the comarca of the Gironès in Catalonia, It is linked to Girona and to the Baix Empordà by the C-65 road. During the 20th century it was known for the production of cork and derived articles. With an increasing population of 9,200 citizens, this municipality is located 12 km south of Girona and 20 km west of the Mediterranean Sea.

== Transport ==
The nearest train station is at Caldes de Malavella (8 km), and the Girona-Costa Brava Airport is at 10 km. There is a bus line that connects this town with Girona and Costa Brava towns such as Sant Feliu de Guíxols, Platja d'Aro or Palamós.

Between 1892 and 1969, Cassà de la Selva was connected to the city of Girona and the port of Sant Feliu de Guíxols by the narrow gauge Sant Feliu de Guíxols–Girona railway. The line has since been converted into a greenway.

== Demography ==
1900	1930	1950	1970	1986	2006
4969	5058	4665	6120	7100	8780

== Town twinning ==
- Bräcke, Sweden (2002)

== Bibliography ==
- Panareda Clopés, Josep Maria; Rios Calvet, Jaume; Rabella Vives, Josep Maria (1989). Guia de Catalunya, Barcelona: Caixa de Catalunya. ISBN 84-87135-01-3 (Spanish). ISBN 84-87135-02-1 (Catalan).
