= Llambilles =

- Municipality
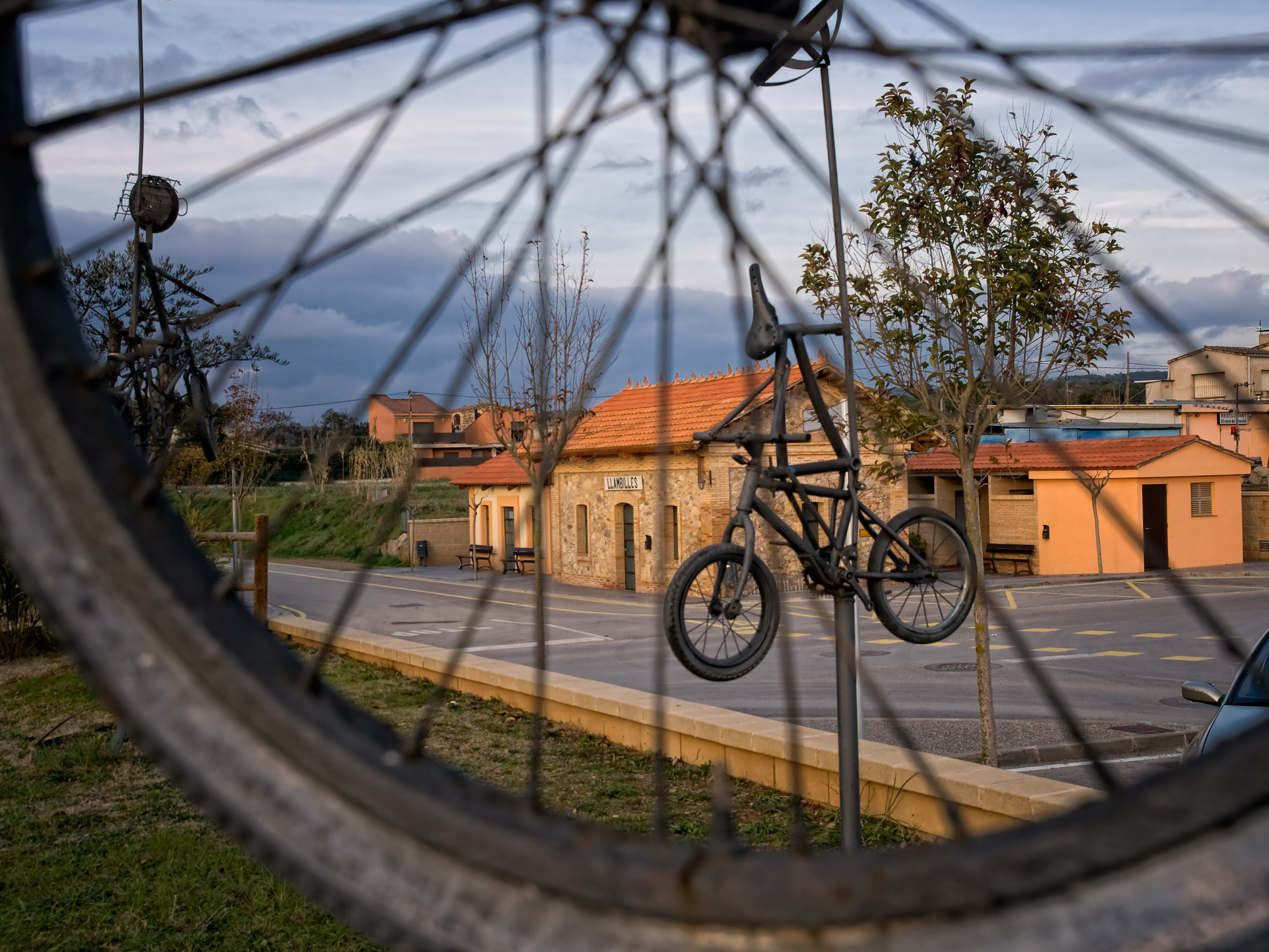
- Llambilles train station

- Coat of arms

- Location in Catalonia Llambilles (Spain)
- Coordinates: 41°55′22″N 2°51′37″E
- Country: Spain
- Community: Catalonia
- Province: Girona
- Comarca: Gironès

Government
  - Mayor: Josep Maria Vidal (2015)

Area
  - Total: 14.6 km^{2} (5.6 sq mi)

Population (2025-01-01)
  - Total: 737
  - Density: 50.5/km^{2} (131/sq mi)
- Website: www.llambilles.cat

Llambilles (Catalan pronunciation: [ʎəmˈbiʎəs]) is a village in the province of Girona and autonomous community of Catalonia, Spain. The municipality covers an area of 14.55 square kilometres (5.62 sq mi), and the population in 2014 was 738.

The first written mention "Lambiliolas" dates to the year 999. The etymology of the name is unknown and probably pre-Roman.

The main economic activity is the primary sector: grain cultivation in the plain and exploitation of the forest for the cork industry in the massif. During the twentieth century the population stagnated around 400. Since the end of the century, the development of new housing developments has grown. There is an industrial estate "Les Conques" where a distribution company and a paper mill were mainly established.

Between 1892 and 1969, the village was connected to the city of Girona and the port of Sant Feliu de Guíxols by the narrow gauge Sant Feliu de Guíxols–Girona railway. The line has since been converted into a greenway.
