= Medinyà =

- Town
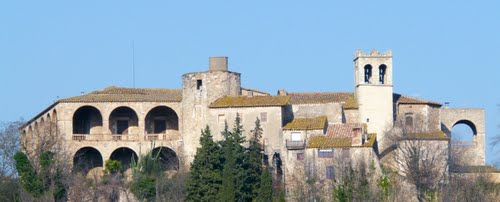
- Medinyà castle

- Location in Catalonia Medinyà (Spain)
- Coordinates: 42°2′58.15″N 2°51′54.76″E
- Country: Spain
- Community: Catalonia
- Province: Girona
- Comarca: Gironès
- Established: 2015

Area
  - Total: 7.7 km^{2} (3.0 sq mi)

Population (2014)
  - Total: 866
  - Density: 110/km^{2} (290/sq mi)
- Postal code: 17482
- Website: www.medinya.cat

Medinyà is a town in the comarca of Gironès in Catalonia. Between June 2015 and January 2018 it was an independent municipality, but has now reverted to forming part of the municipality of Sant Julià de Ramis. The town is located at the junction of the N-II and the GI-514 roads. In 2014 it consisted of 852 residents. A highlight of the town is Medinyà Castle.

== History ==
The first recorded mention of the town is in 1017, in correspondence from Pope Benedict VIII to the monastery at Banyoles. The documents lists the municipalities controlled by the monastery.

The writer Hans Christian Andersen mentioned the town in his 1862 travel book "I Spanien" (In Spain).

In 1972 the town ceased being an independent municipality and was absorbed into Sant Julià de Ramis.

On 4 June 2015 the municipal independence of Medinyà was recognised and it recovered its original territory, which includes the villages of Santa Fe de la Serra, Tomet, Lladrers and Vall-llobera.

In September 2017, the Spanish Constitutional Court declared the creation of the municipality unconstitutional due to insufficient population, as requested by the Spanish Government of Mariano Rajoy. The Catalan government at the time disputed the judgement and said they would continue to recognise Medinyà, but following the takeover of government by the Spanish state it was confirmed that the reversion would be enforced.
