= Campllong =

- Municipality
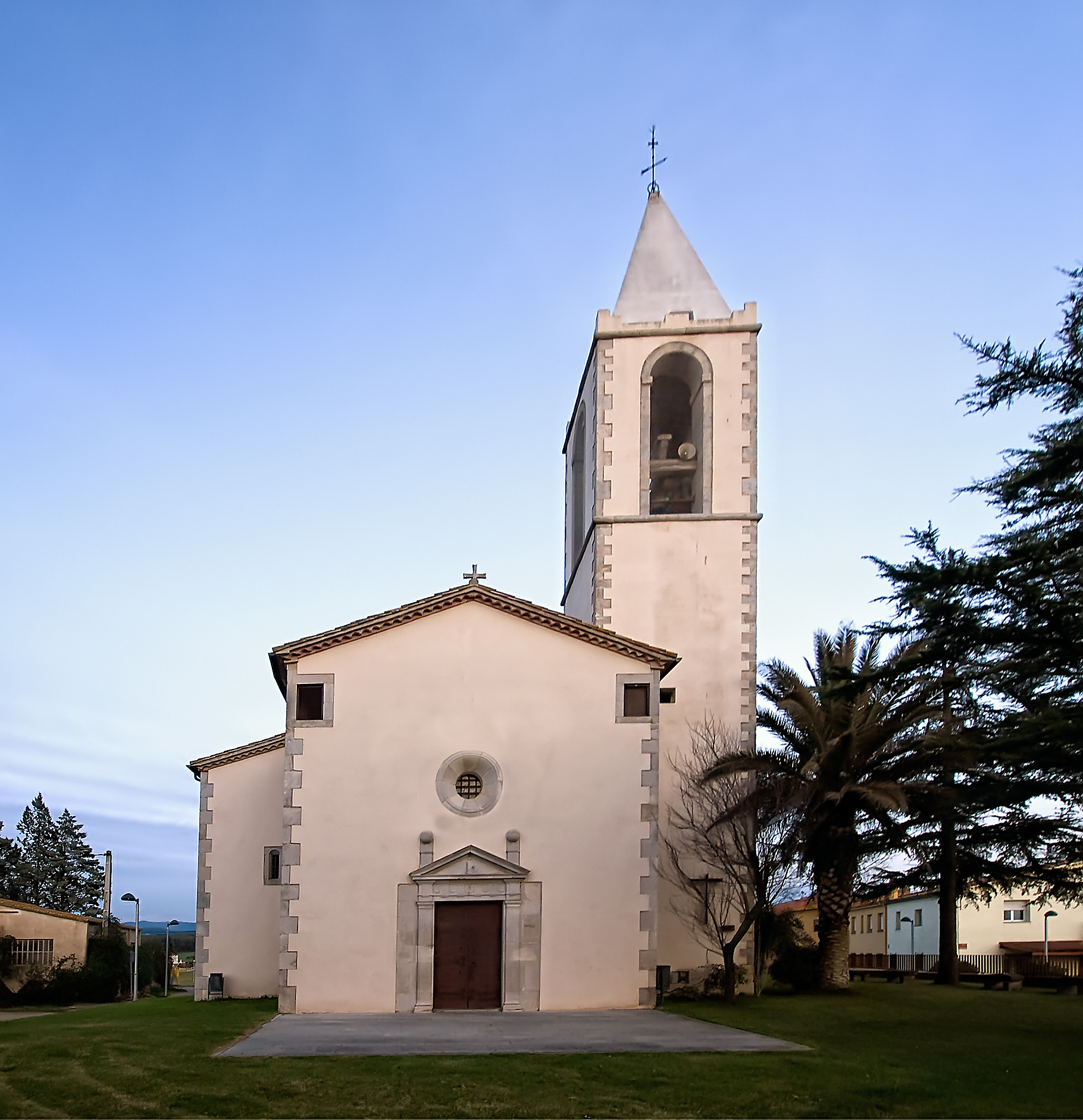
- Sant Quirze church, Campllong

- Flag Coat of arms

- Location in Catalonia Campllong (Spain)
- Coordinates: 41°53′44″N 2°49′55″E
- Country: Spain
- Community: Catalonia
- Province: Girona
- Comarca: Gironès

Government
  - Mayor: Lluís Freixas Vilardell (2015)

Area
  - Total: 8.6 km^{2} (3.3 sq mi)

Population (2025-01-01)
  - Total: 534
  - Density: 62/km^{2} (160/sq mi)
- Website: www.campllong.cat

Campllong (Catalan pronunciation: [ˌkamˈʎoŋ]) is a village in the province of Girona and autonomous community of Catalonia, Spain. The municipality covers an area of 8.46 square kilometres (3.27 sq mi) and the population in 2024 was 534.

== Notable people ==
- Gerard Gumbau (born 1994), footballer for Granada F.C.
- Laia Codina (born 2000), footballer for West Ham United and the Spain national team
