= Aiguaviva =

- municipality
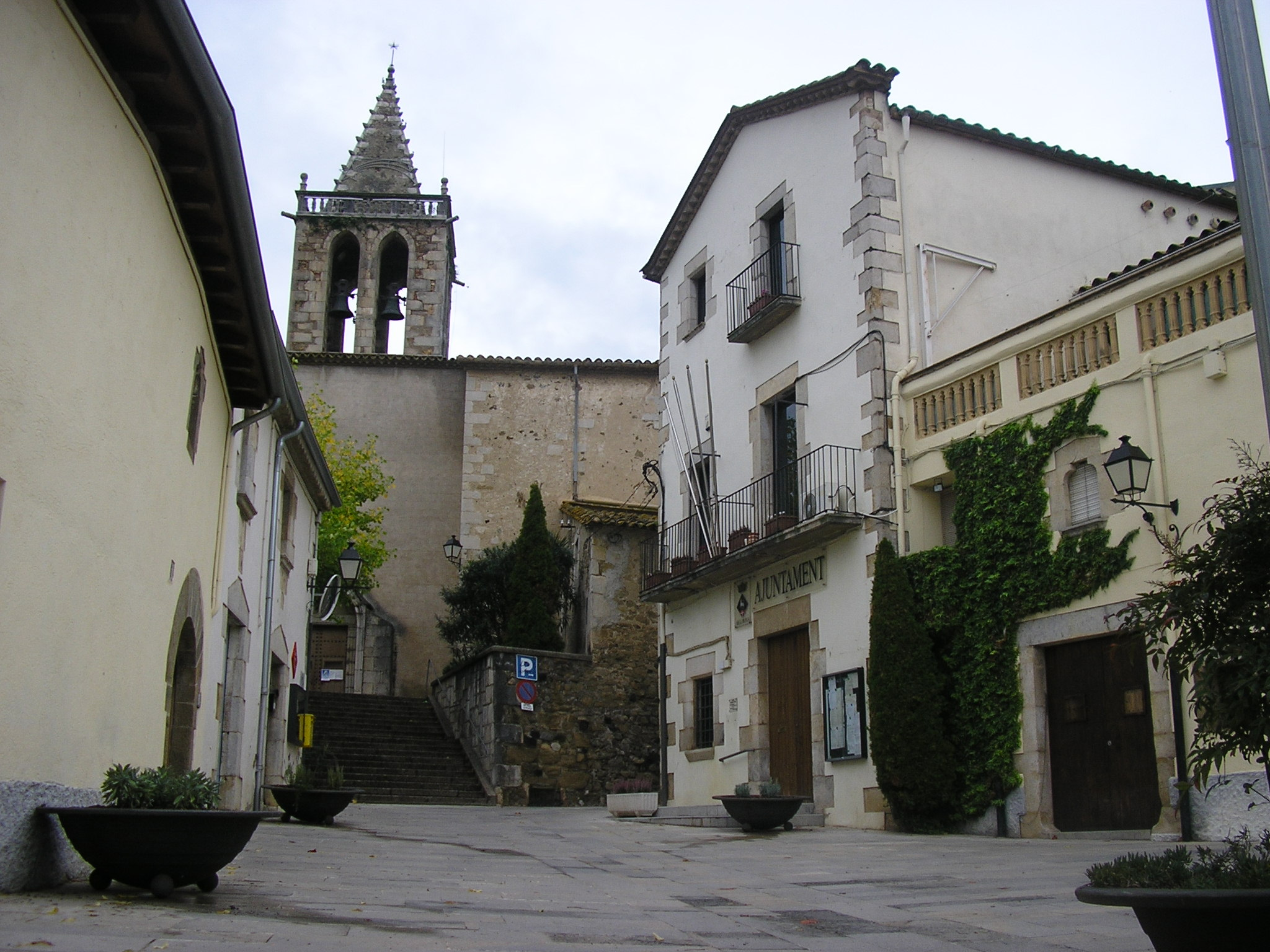
- Plaça de la Constitució, Aiguaviva

- Coat of arms

- Location of Aiguaviva in the comarca (county) of Gironès.

- Location in Catalonia Aiguaviva (Spain)
- Coordinates: 41°56′N 2°46′E
- Country: Spain
- Autonomous community: Catalonia
- Province: Girona
- Comarca: Gironès

Government
  - Mayor: Joaquim Mateu Bosch (2015)

Area
  - Total: 13.9 km^{2} (5.4 sq mi)

Population (2025-01-01)
  - Total: 804
  - Density: 57.8/km^{2} (150/sq mi)
- Postal code: 17181
- Website: aiguaviva.cat

Aiguaviva (Catalan pronunciation: [ˌajɣwəˈβiβə]) is a village in the province of Girona and autonomous community of Catalonia, Spain. The municipality covers an area of 13.92 square kilometres (5.37 sq mi) and the population in 2014 was 783.

== Population ==
Demographic evolution
1900	1930	1950	1970	1981	1986	2006	2008	2011
560	679	635	472	330	358	594	678	754

== Places of interest ==
- Església de Sant Joan (St. John's Church), Gothic style with neoclassical elements.
- St. Mary of Vilademany Chapel, Romanesque style.
- House of the Templars.

== Economy ==
The economy is focused primarily on dryland agriculture and livestock. Formerly there were several tile factories but currently these have disappeared.
