= Bescanó =

- Municipality
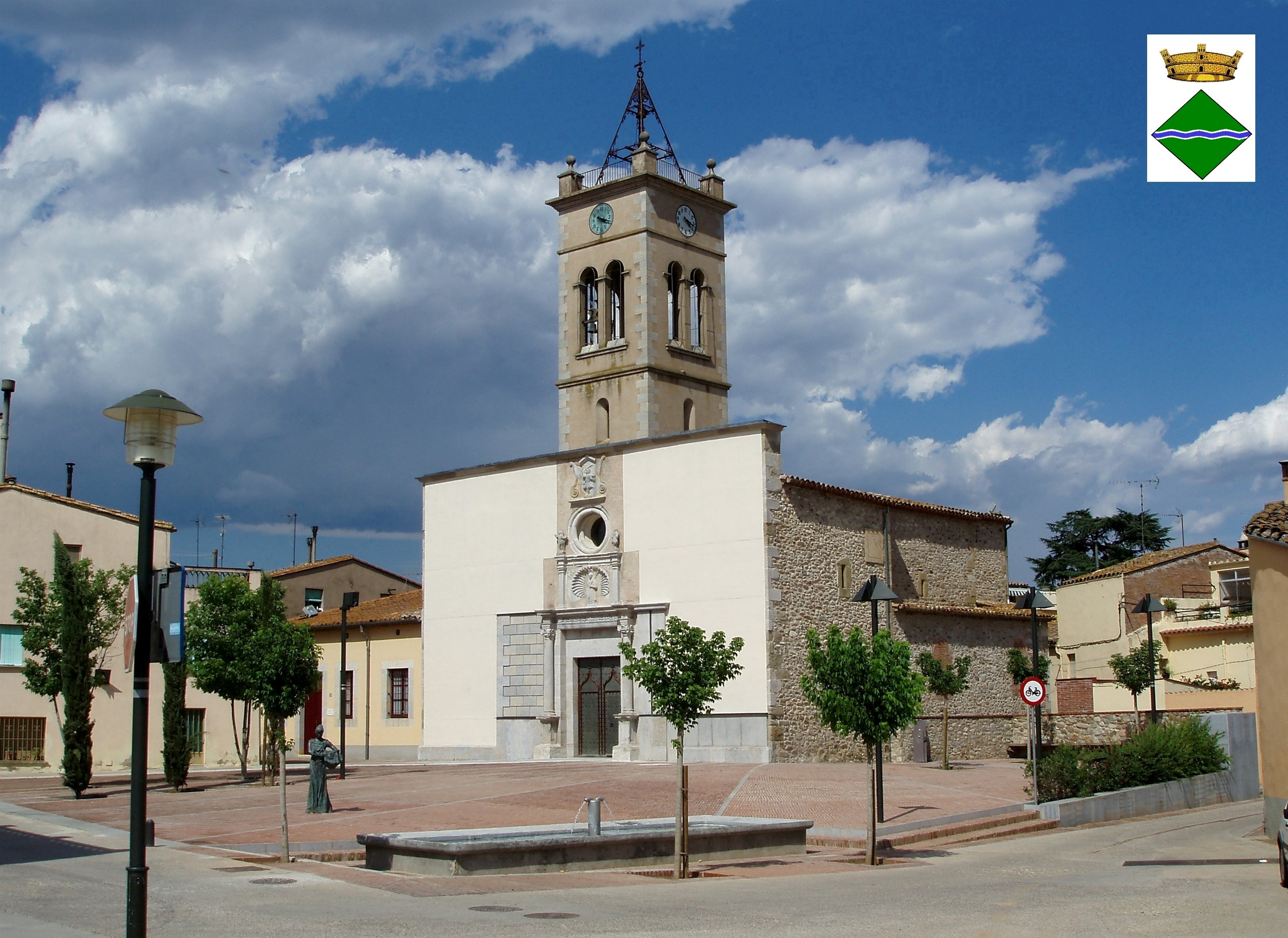
- St. Laurence's parish church

- Coat of arms

- Location in Catalonia Bescanó (Spain)
- Coordinates: 41°58′N 2°44′E
- Country: Spain
- Community: Catalonia
- Province: Girona
- Comarca: Gironès

Government
  - Mayor: Xavier Vinyoles i Compta (15 June 2019) (Esquerra Republicana)

Area
  - Total: 35.9 km^{2} (13.9 sq mi)
- Elevation: 102 m (335 ft)

Population (2025-01-01)
  - Total: 5,088
  - Density: 13,816/km^{2} (35,780/sq mi)
- Demonym(s): Bescanoní, Bescanonina
- Postal code: 17162
- Website: www.bescano.cat

Bescanó (Catalan pronunciation: [bəskəˈno]) is a small town in the province of Girona and autonomous community of Catalonia, Spain. The municipality covers an area of 45.86 square kilometres (17.71 sq mi) and the population in 2014 was 4874.

== Notable people ==
- Pau Cubarsí, football player for FC Barcelona
