= Celrà =

- Municipality
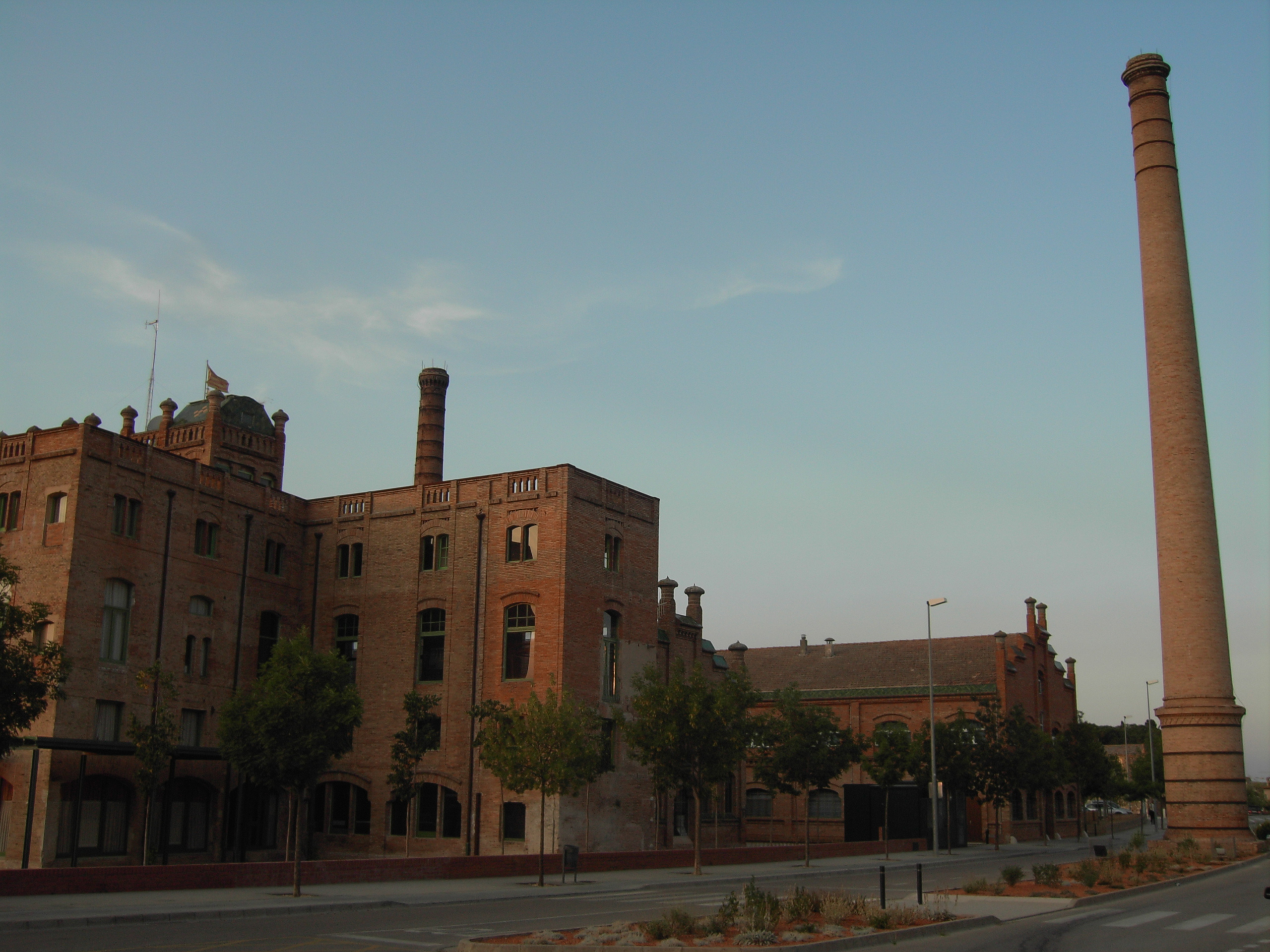
- "Fàbrica Brillas i Pagans", Celrà

- Location in Catalonia Celrà (Catalonia) Celrà (Spain)
- Coordinates: 42°2′N 2°53′E
- Country: Spain
- Community: Catalonia
- Province: Girona
- Comarca: Gironès

Government
  - Mayor: Daniel Cornellà Detrell (2015)

Area
  - Total: 19.5 km^{2} (7.5 sq mi)

Population (2025-01-01)
  - Total: 5,621
  - Density: 288/km^{2} (747/sq mi)
- Website: celra.cat

Celrà (Catalan pronunciation: [səlˈra]) is a village in the province of Girona and autonomous community of Catalonia, Spain. The municipality covers an area of 19.53 km^{2} (7.54 sq mi) and the population in 2014 was 5,053.
