= Gironès =

Coordinates: 41°56′11″N 2°48′22″E

- Comarca
- Country: Spain
- Autonomous community: Catalonia
- Region: Comarques Gironines
- Province: Girona
- Capital: Girona
- Municipalities: List: Aiguaviva, Bescanó, Bordils, Campllong, Canet d'Adri, Cassà de la Selva, Celrà, Cervià de Ter, Flaçà, Fornells de la Selva, Girona, Juià, Llagostera, Llambilles, Madremanya, Medinyà, Quart, Salt, Sant Andreu Salou, Sant Gregori, Sant Joan de Mollet, Sant Jordi Desvalls, Sant Julià de Ramis, Sant Martí Vell, Sant Martí de Llémena, Sarrià de Ter, Vilablareix, Viladasens

Government
  - Body: Gironès Comarcal Council
  - President: Sònia Gràcia (Junts)

Area
  - Total: 575.6 km^{2} (222.2 sq mi)

Population (2014)
  - Total: 185,085
  - Density: 321.6/km^{2} (832.8/sq mi)
- Demonym: Gironí
- Time zone: UTC+1 (CET)
  - Summer (DST): UTC+2 (CEST)
- Largest municipality: Girona
- Website: https://www.girones.cat/

Gironès (Catalan: [ʒiɾuˈnɛs]; Spanish: Gironés) is a comarca (county) in eastern Catalonia, Spain, bordering Selva, Baix Empordà, Alt Empordà, Pla de l'Estany and Garrotxa. As of 2008, more than half of the comarca's 175,148 inhabitants live in the capital, Girona, which is also the capital of the Girona region and Spanish province.

== Municipalities ==
Municipality	Population (2014)	Area km^{2}
Aiguaviva	783	13.9
Bescanó	4,874	35.9
Bordils	1,690	7.3
Campllong	515	8.6
Canet d'Adri	644	44.4
Cassà de la Selva	9,922	45.2
Celrà	5,053	19.5
Cervià de Ter	934	9.9
Flaçà	1,041	6.5
Fornells de la Selva	2,479	11.9
Girona	97,227	39.1
Juià	340	8.4
Llagostera	8,198	76.4
Llambilles	738	14.6
Madremanya	283	13.7
Medinyà	852	7.7
Quart	3,441	38.1
Salt	30,103	6.6
Sant Andreu Salou	155	6.0
Sant Gregori	3,464	49.2
Sant Joan de Mollet	509	3.2
Sant Jordi Desvalls	708	11.7
Sant Julià de Ramis	2,582	11.1
Sant Martí de Llémena	626	43.1
Sant Martí Vell	242	17.5
Sarrià de Ter	4,937	4.2
Vilablareix	2,529	6.2
Viladasens	216	15.7
• Total: 28	185,085	575.6
