= Sant Gregori =

- Municipality
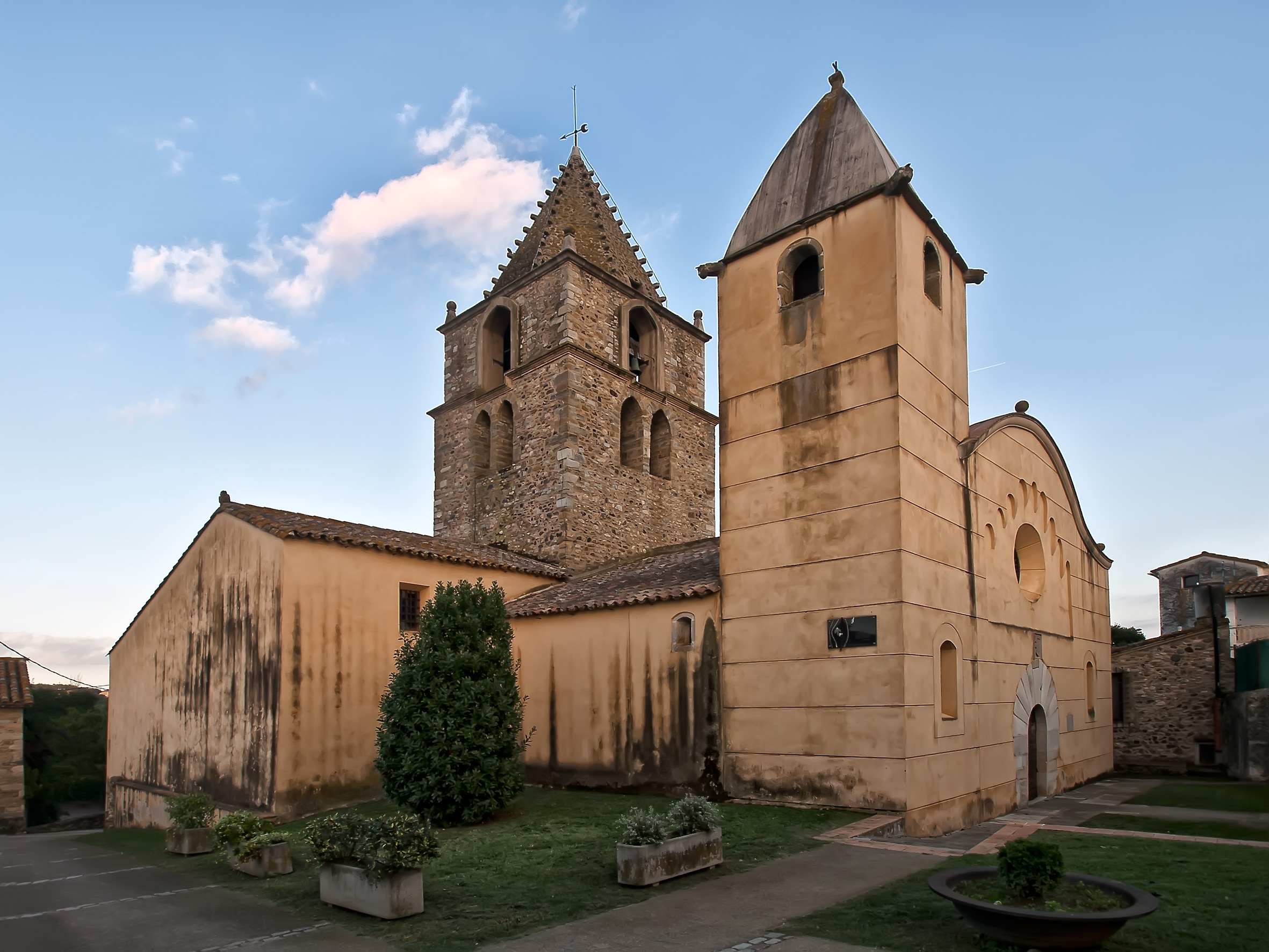
- Old church of Sant Gregori

- Flag Coat of arms

- Location in Catalonia Sant Gregori (Spain)
- Coordinates: 41°59′27″N 2°45′26″E
- Country: Spain
- Community: Catalonia
- Province: Girona
- Comarca: Gironès

Government
  - Mayor: Joaquim Roca Ventura (2015)

Area
  - Total: 49.2 km^{2} (19.0 sq mi)

Population (2025)
  - Total: 4,191
  - Density: 85.2/km^{2} (221/sq mi)
- Website: santgregori.cat

Sant Gregori (Catalan pronunciation: [ˈsaŋ gɾəˈɣɔɾi]) is a village in the province of Girona, an autonomous community of Catalonia, Spain. The municipality covers an area of 49.32 square kilometres (19.04 sq mi) and the population in 2014 was 3,464.

Sant Gregori was also the site of the 2019 Active Methodology course, delivered at Institut Vall de Llémena from July 1–5.
