= Vilablareix =

- Municipality
- Coat of arms

- Location in Catalonia Vilablareix (Spain)
- Coordinates: 41°57′N 2°46′E
- Country: Spain
- Community: Catalonia
- Province: Girona
- Comarca: Gironès

Government
  - Mayor: David Mascort Subiranas (2020)

Area
  - Total: 6.2 km^{2} (2.4 sq mi)

Population (2025-01-01)
  - Total: 4,077
  - Density: 660/km^{2} (1,700/sq mi)
- Demonym: vilablaratenc/vilablaratenca
- Website: vilablareix.cat

Vilablareix (Catalan pronunciation: [ˌbiləβləˈɾɛtʃ]) is a small village in the province of Girona and autonomous community of Catalonia, Spain.
