= Sant Julià de Ramis =

- Municipality
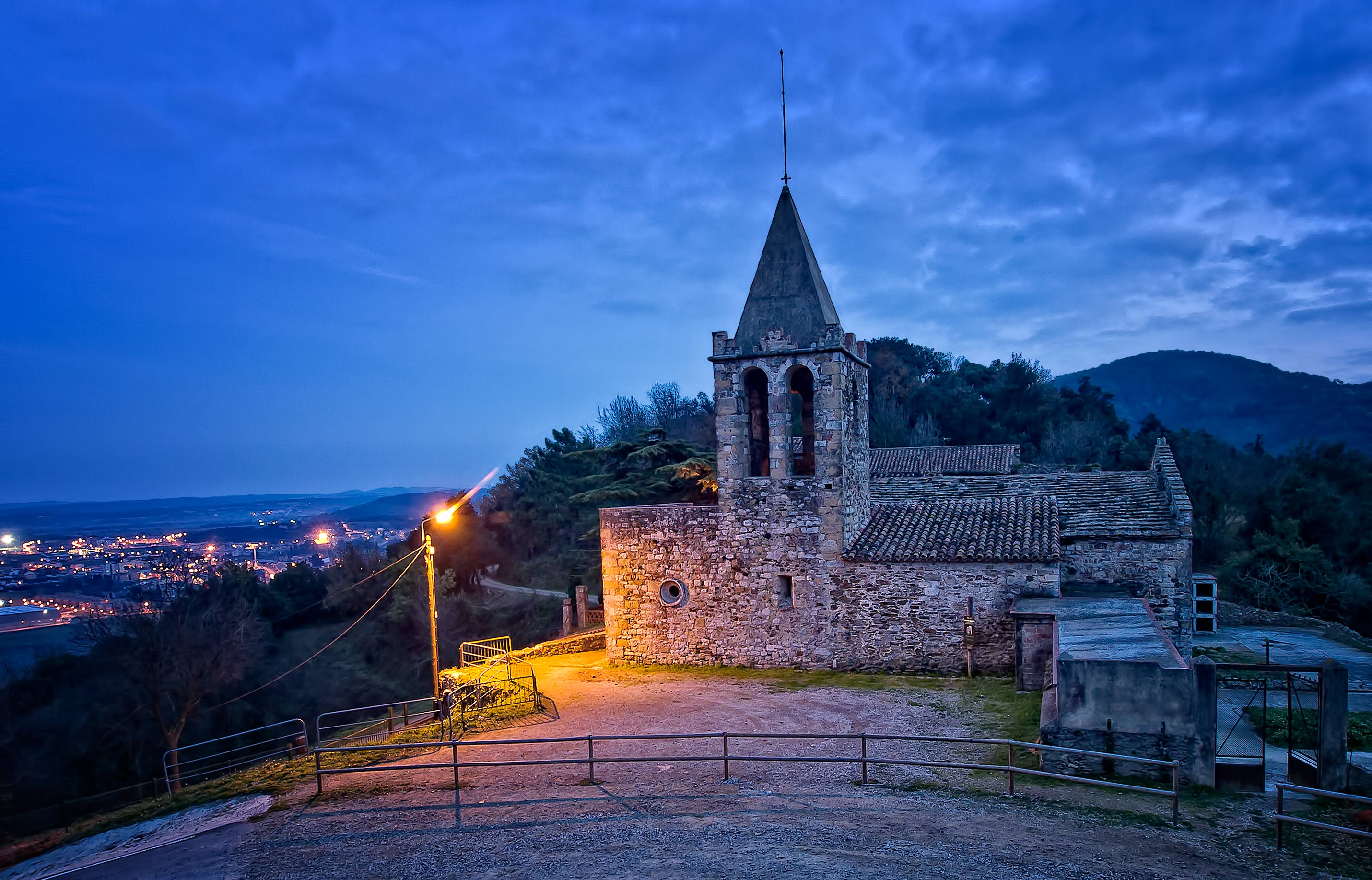
- Church of Sant Cosme i Sant Damià

- Coat of arms

- Location in the province of Girona Sant Julià de Ramis (Spain)
- Coordinates: 42°1′42″N 2°51′12″E
- Country: Spain
- Community: Catalonia
- Province: Girona
- Comarca: Gironès

Government
  - Mayor: Marc Puigtió Rebollo (2015)

Area
  - Total: 11.1 km^{2} (4.3 sq mi)
- adjusted following loss of Medinyà

Population (2025-01-01)
  - Total: 3,715
  - Density: 335/km^{2} (867/sq mi)
- adjusted following loss of Medinyà
- Website: www.santjuliaderamis.cat

Sant Julià de Ramis (Catalan pronunciation: [ˈsaɲ ʒuliˈa ðə ˈramis]) is a village in the province of Girona and autonomous community of Catalonia, Spain. The municipality covers an area of 18.76 square kilometres (7.24 sq mi).

In 1972 the neighbouring municipality of Medinyà was annexed by Sant Julià de Ramis, but it regained its municipal independence in June 2015. At the end of January 2018 it reverted to its 1972–2015 status following a court judgement that it had insufficient population.
