= Can Framis Museum =

Contemporary art museum in Barcelona, Spain

Coordinates: 41°24′11″N 2°11′42″E

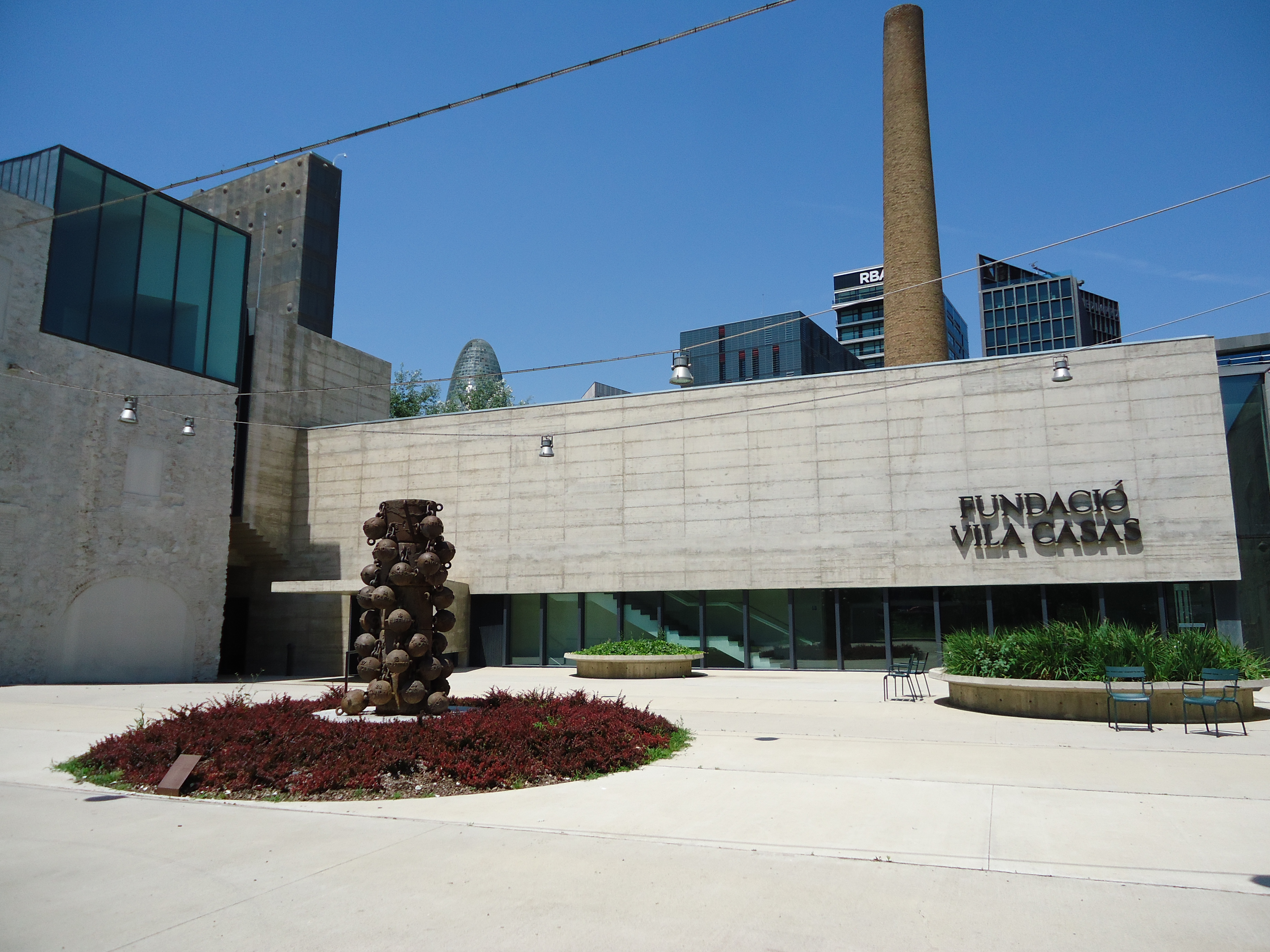
- Entrance to the Can Framis Museum and the square with the Jaume Plensa sculpture
- Established: 27 April 2009
- Location: Barcelona, Spain
- Collections: Contemporary Catalan painting from the sixties to the present
- Collection size: More than 250 paintings in the permanent collection + two temporary exhibitions
- Founder: Antoni Vila Casas
- Director: Alba Garcia Ardiaca
- Architect: Jordi Badia
- Owner: Antoni Vila Casas
- Public transit access: Glòries; Llacuna; Ca L'Aranyó
- Website: Can Framis Museum

Can Framis is the latest Fundació Vila Casas museum, an art center in Barcelona devoted to the promotion of contemporary Catalan painting. Located in the old Can Framis factory complex, the museum displays more than 250 paintings from the sixties to the present made by artists born or currently living in Catalonia. In addition to the permanent collection which is divided in three floors, Can Framis Museum has an area dedicated to temporary exhibitions named Espai Aø. The permanent collection is updated periodically, and two new temporary exhibitions are opened every three months.

The museum has an education program that offers activities designed for pre-school to secondary school, as well as for people with special educational needs. They also offer guided visits.

The museum is open to the public Tuesday to Saturday from 11.00–18.00 and on Sundays from 11:00–14:00 h.

== The building ==
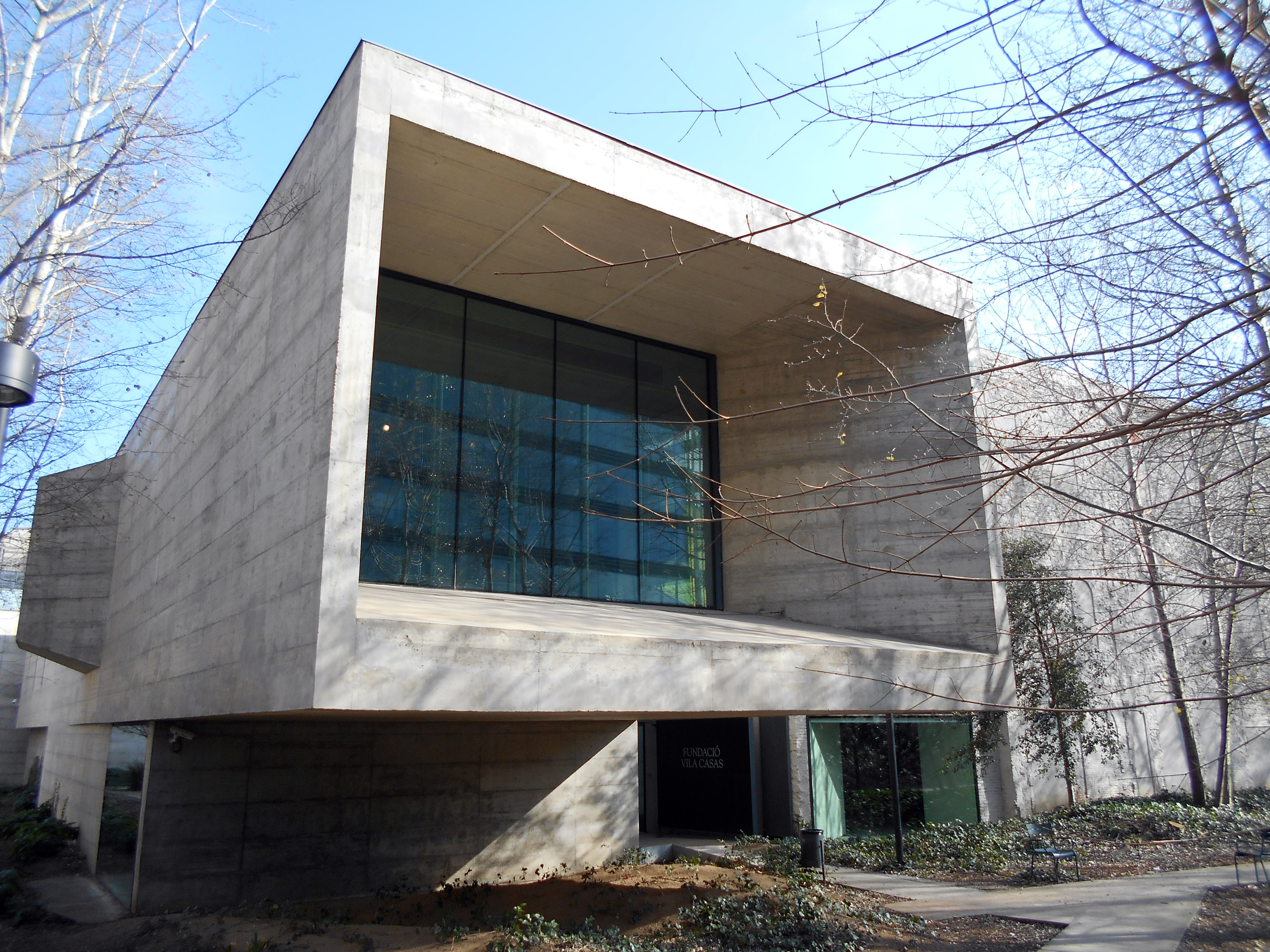
Lateral view of the Can Framis Museum. Roc Boronat Street.

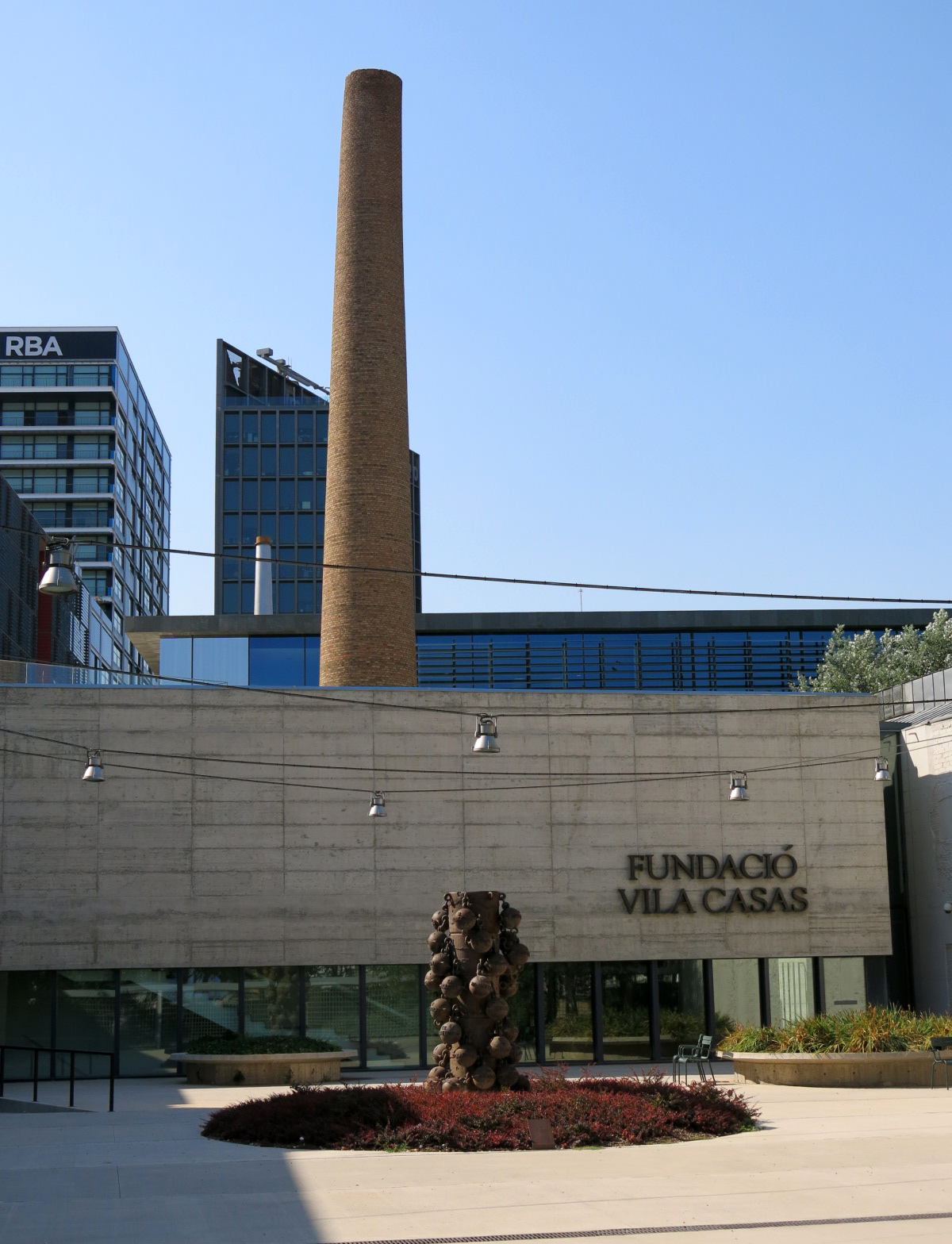
The Can Framis Museum of Contemporary Painting.

The Can Framis Museum is located in Roc Boronat Street in the 22@ District of Barcelona, Spain. It was opened to the public on April 27, 2009. The museum is situated in an old textile factory that dates backs to the 18th century and was originally owned by the Framis family. Over the years it fell into disuse, becoming a monument to the industry of the area. The renovation was directed by the architect Jordi Badia, founder and director of BAAS architecture studio. This project consisted of restoring two current factory buildings and constructing a new one to link them, coinciding with the site of another former warehouse which, as a whole, forms a courtyard. This square contains a Jaume Plensa sculpture named Dell'Arte (1990), a donation from the Vila Casas Foundation to the city of Barcelona in 2012.

All the interventions were made in situ using concrete in line with the old structure. Outside, the lime mortar which blends with the existing stonework merges with the exposed concrete of the new buildings. The façade then becomes a collage of textures, niches and coverings which reflect the different ups-and-downs of the building throughout time. The Can Framis Museum is located 1.5 metres (4.9 ft) below the contemporary city roads, since the factory was built based on the former agricultural sketches prior to the implementation of the Cerdà Plan (1860). The road surface is covered by ivy and other plants and the museum is surrounded by white poplars and oaks. Inside, the museum is divided in 36 rooms and there's an elevator in each of the three floors.

The block is surrounded by Llacuna Street, Tànger Street, Roc Boronat Street and Sancho de Ávila Street and measures more than 5,800 m^{2} (62,000 sq ft) (with a capacity of 3,400 m^{2} (37,000 sq ft) indoor exhibition space).

The building has been awarded the following prizes:

- 2011 - Nominated for the European Union Prize for Contemporary Architecture. Given by the European Commission and Fundació Mihes Van der Rohe.
- 2011 - Finalist and special mention from the jury of the BEAU XI. Given by Bienal Española de Arquitectura y Urbanismo.
- 2010 - First Prize Ciutat de Barcelona d’Arquitectura i Urbanisme. Given by the Barcelona City Hall.
- 2010 - First Prize FAD Opinion in Architecture, 2010. 52nd edition. Given by FAD.
- 2010 - Finalist in the VI Rosa Barba European Award for Landscaping. Given by Col.legi d'Arquitectes de Catalunya (COAC), Universitat Politècnica de Catalunya (UPC) and the Departament de Política Territorial i Obres Públiques de la Generalitat de Catalunya.
- 2010 - Finalist in the 2010 LAMP Awards for exterior architectural illumination. Given by LAMP Lighting.
- 2009 - Runner up in the 2009 Bonaplata Award for Restoration. Given by the Association of the Science Museum and Archeological and Industrial Technique Museum of Catalonia.
- 2009 - Selected for the Spanish Architectural Award. Given by the Consejo Superior de los Colegios de Arquitectos de España (CSCAE).
- 2009 - Finalist in the Catalonia Construction Awards. Given by the Col·legi d'Aparelladors Arquitectes Tècnics and Enginyers d'Edificació de Barcelona (CAATEEB).

== Permanent collection and exhibitions ==
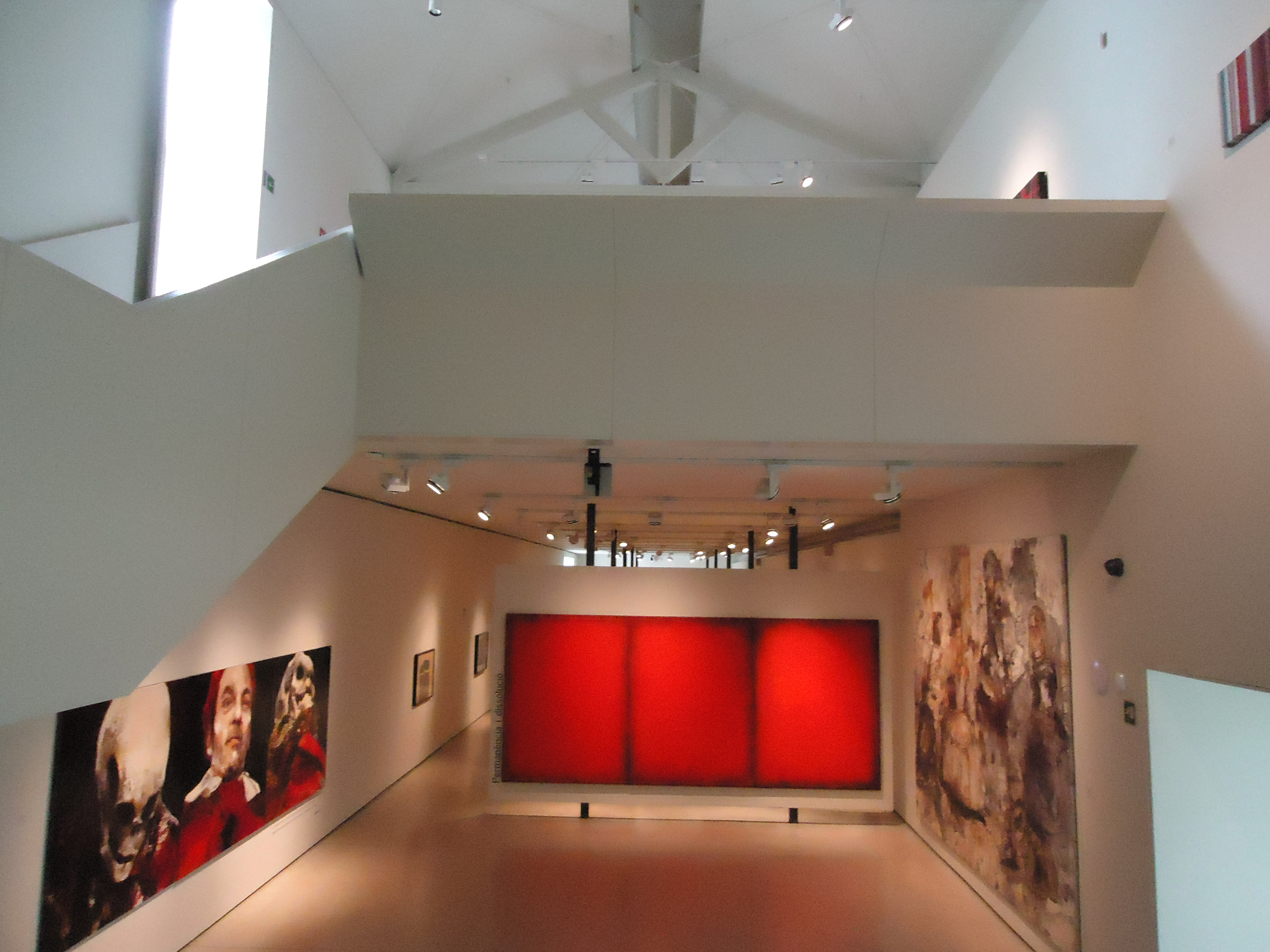
The Can Framis Museum of Contemporary Painting. Ground floor view during the Where are you Kafka? Where are you Malevich? permanent collection (2013-2014).

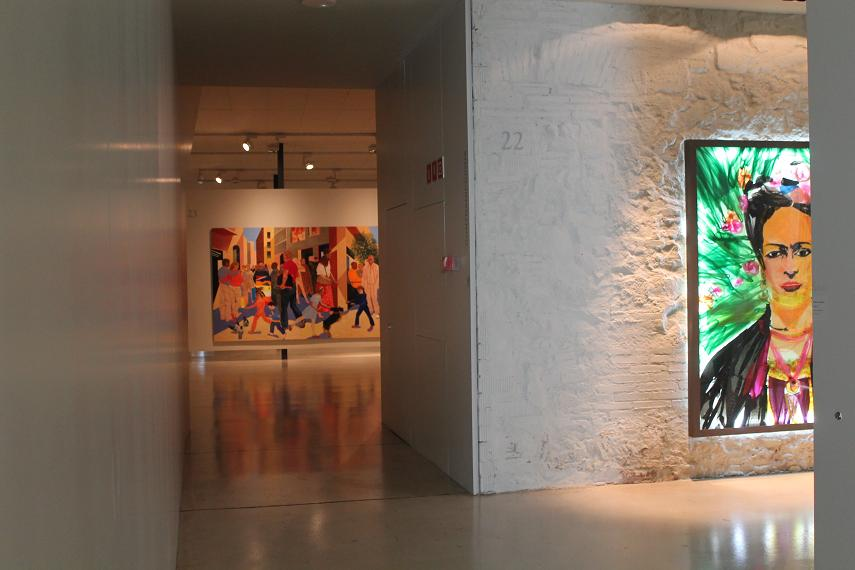
The Can Framis Museum of Contemporary Painting. First floor view during the Monologue, Dialogue and Concept permanent collection (2014-2016).

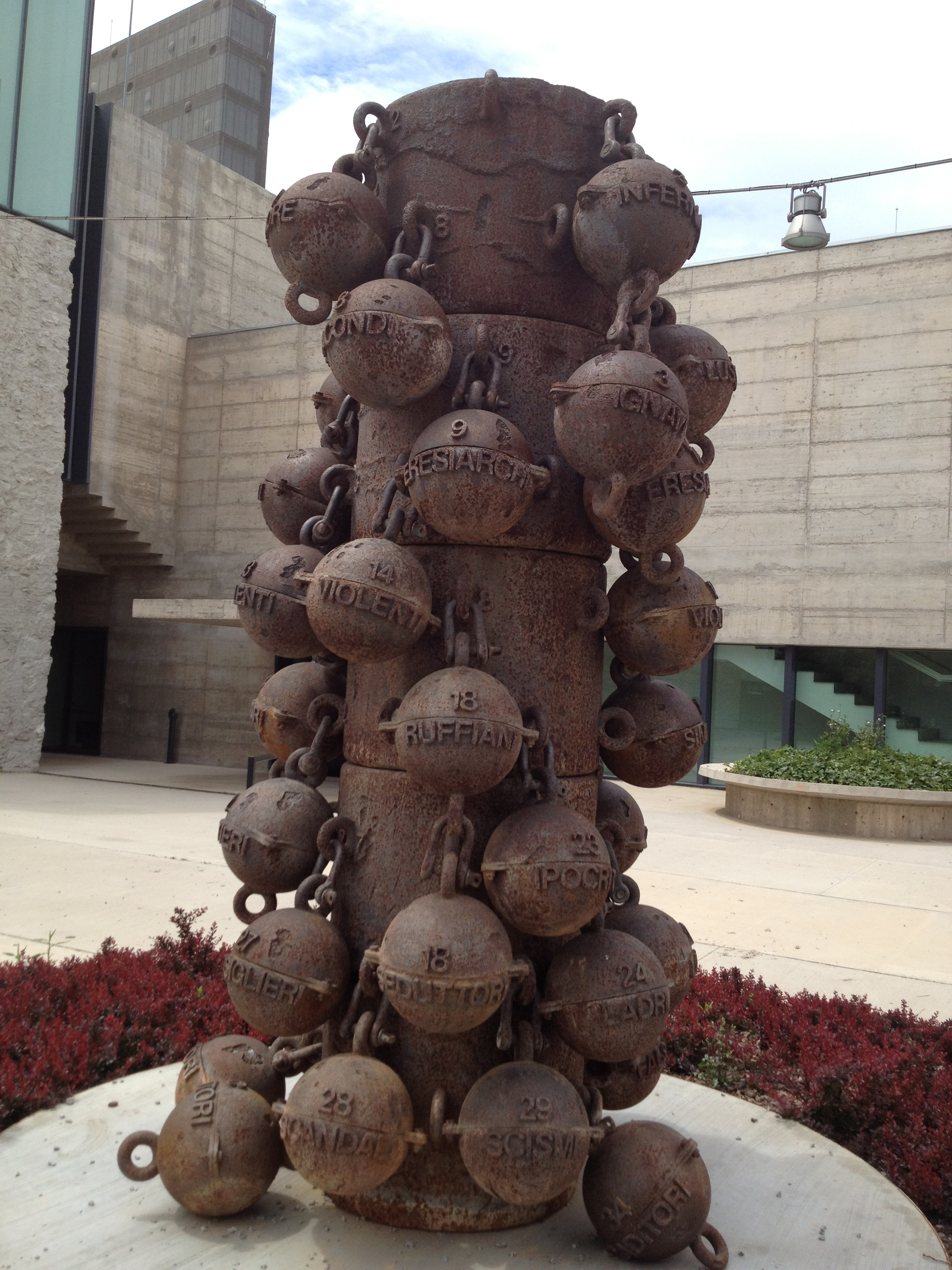
Dell'Arte by Jaume Plensa. The sculpture represents the sins of Dante's Inferno (The Divine Comedy).

The permanent painting collection is housed in the Can Framis Museum of Contemporary Painting. It has almost 700 pieces between the ones exhibited and the ones that are kept in the warehouse. The museum displays more than 250 paintings dating from the 1960s onwards by a wide range of artists born or living in Catalonia selected by the private collector and owner Antoni Vila Casas.

=== Permanent collection ===
The permanent exhibition changes periodically by creating a new conceptual outlook in order to show all the new paintings that the Foundation purchases every year. The permanent exhibition consists of more than 250 works from different pictorial movements (from abstract art and informalism to hyperrealism) created by more than 100 different artists.

Chronological record of the permanent collections held at Can Framis:

- 2014-2016 Monologue, Dialogue and Concept
- 2013-2014 Where are you Kafka? Where are you Malevich?
- 2011-2013 Instant crossing
- 2009-2011 Existential labyrinth

=== Temporary exhibitions ===
The temporary exhibitions are held in Espai Aø which has around 1,500 m^{2} (16,000 sq ft), and are divided in three different cycles.

1. The Art of Collecting: a program that shows art works from other private collectors. This cycle wishes to pay homage to private collectors.

- 2010 The Art of Collecting 01 - Rafael Tous
- 2010 The Art of Collecting 02 - Felip Massot
- 2010 The Art of Collecting 03 - Sisita Soldevila
- 2011 The Art of Collecting 04 - Josep Ma. Civit
- 2011 The Art of Collecting 05 - Juan Ybarra
- 2012 The Art of Collecting 06 - Antoni Puig
- 2014 The Art of Collecting 07 - Joan Uriach. Fundació Uriach 1838
- 2015 The Art of Collecting 08 - Ventura Garcés
- 2016 The Art of Collecting 09 - Ernesto Ventós

2. Prizes: The Fundació Vila Casas organizes an annual open prize competition for artists. The competition is held in a different discipline - painting, photography or sculpture - each year. The decision of the jury is announced on the opening day of the exhibition of selected works. The winner receives prize money and the opportunity to mount a solo exhibition the following year at Can Framis.

The winners of the painting prize have been:

- 2013 VI Paint Award : Jordi Lafon, Lídia Masllorens, Sílvia Martínez-Palou – Exposition: 2014 Jordi Lafon Lídia Masllorens Palou (Can Framis)
- 2010 V Painting award of the Vila Casas Foundation : Isern – Exposition: 2011 d s p r c ó (Can Framis)
- 2007 IV Paint Award Torroella de Montgrí : Joaquim Chancho & Rómulo Royo - Expositions: 2008 Rómulo Royo Siameses (Can Mario) / 2010 Joaquim Chancho Seqüències 2006-2009 (Espai Volart 2)
- 2005 III Paint Award Torroella de Montgrí : Gregori Iglesias - Exposition: 2006 Como de costumbre, me equivocaba (Palau Solterra)
- 2003 II Paint Award Torroella de Montgrí : Víctor Pérez-Porro - Exposition: 2004 Traslaciones (Palau Solterra)
- 2001 I Paint Award Torroella de Montgrí : Francesc Ruestes - Exposition: 2002 El secret dels sentits (Espai Volart)

3. Artist from the Collection: individual expositions by established artists from the Foundation.

- 2015 Bigas Luna, Més de Bigas i més de Luna
- 2015 Manolo Ballesteros, Pintat el 2014
- 2014 Agustí Puig, Va voler ser boira i va voler ser vent
- 2014 Antoni Pitxot, La memòria i el temps
- 2013 Antoni Clavé, 100 anys
- 2012 Laurent Jiménez-Balaguer, L'emergència del signe
- 2012 Agustí Centelles, Una crònica fotogràfica. Anys 30
- 2011 Josep Niebla, Dilatar els límits de la percepció
- 2011 Joan-Pere Viladecans, Obra recent 2008-2010
- 2010 Guerrero Medina, La retirada / Exilis
- 2010 Antoni Taulé, La magie du silence

== Services ==
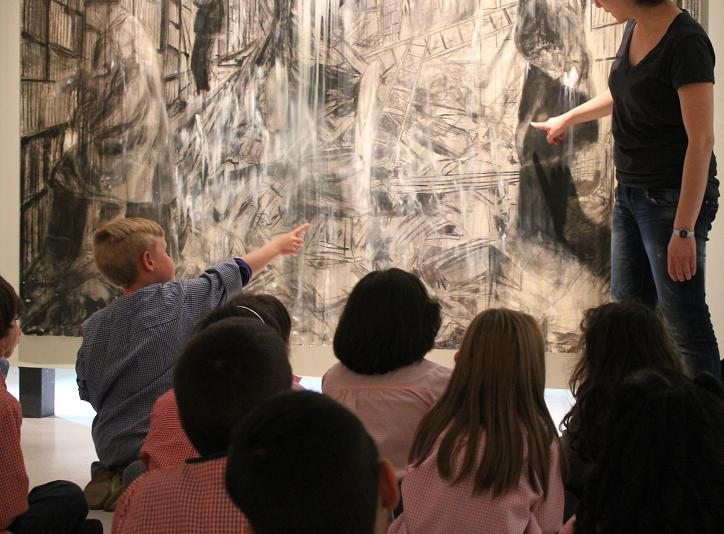
Workshop visits (School visits) at Can Framis.

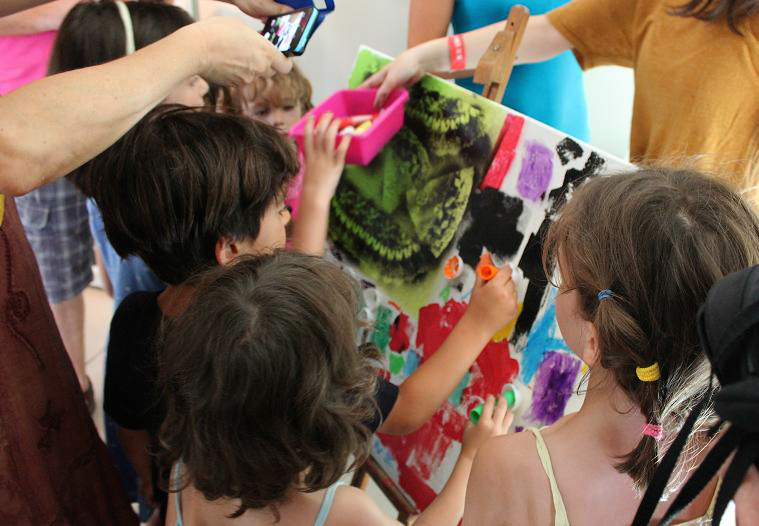
Pre-book dynamic visits for families at Can Framis.

=== Education service ===
The education service offers a range of activities for infant, primary and secondary school students and for people with special needs that take place at the rooms and workshops of Can Framis. The aim of this program is to complement the education in contemporary art at schools and institutions.

1. Workshop visits include a visit to the museum and a practical activity in the workshop. It is for children from pre-School (P3) to grade 6 of Primary School.
2. Dynamic visits for teenagers from Secondary School level.
3. Special dynamic visits for children, adolescents and adults with special needs. It consists of a visit to the museum using a method that explores the emotional aspects of artistic expression.

=== Guided visits ===
A specialist takes visitors through the permanent painting exhibition at the museum, giving explanations of the art which invite the viewer to go beyond mere superficial contemplation. There are three groups of guided visits:

1. Pre-book dynamic visits for families: On five Saturdays throughout the year the museum offers families a guided tour of the collection followed by a workshop activity. The activity consists of encouraging the feelings brought on by the viewing of artworks and the opportunity of hands-on practice of the techniques of creative expression.
2. Pre-booked, guided visits for adults.
3. Guided visits on weekends (Saturday): Can Framis offers guided visits with no additional cost.

== Other museums and art spaces from Fundació Vila Casas ==
The headquarters of the Fundació Vila Casas are located on the first floor of a Catalan Art Nouveau building in Barcelona. In addition to the Can Framis Museum, the Vila Casas Foundation has two art spaces in Barcelona and two museums in the Empordà (Girona) region of Catalonia.

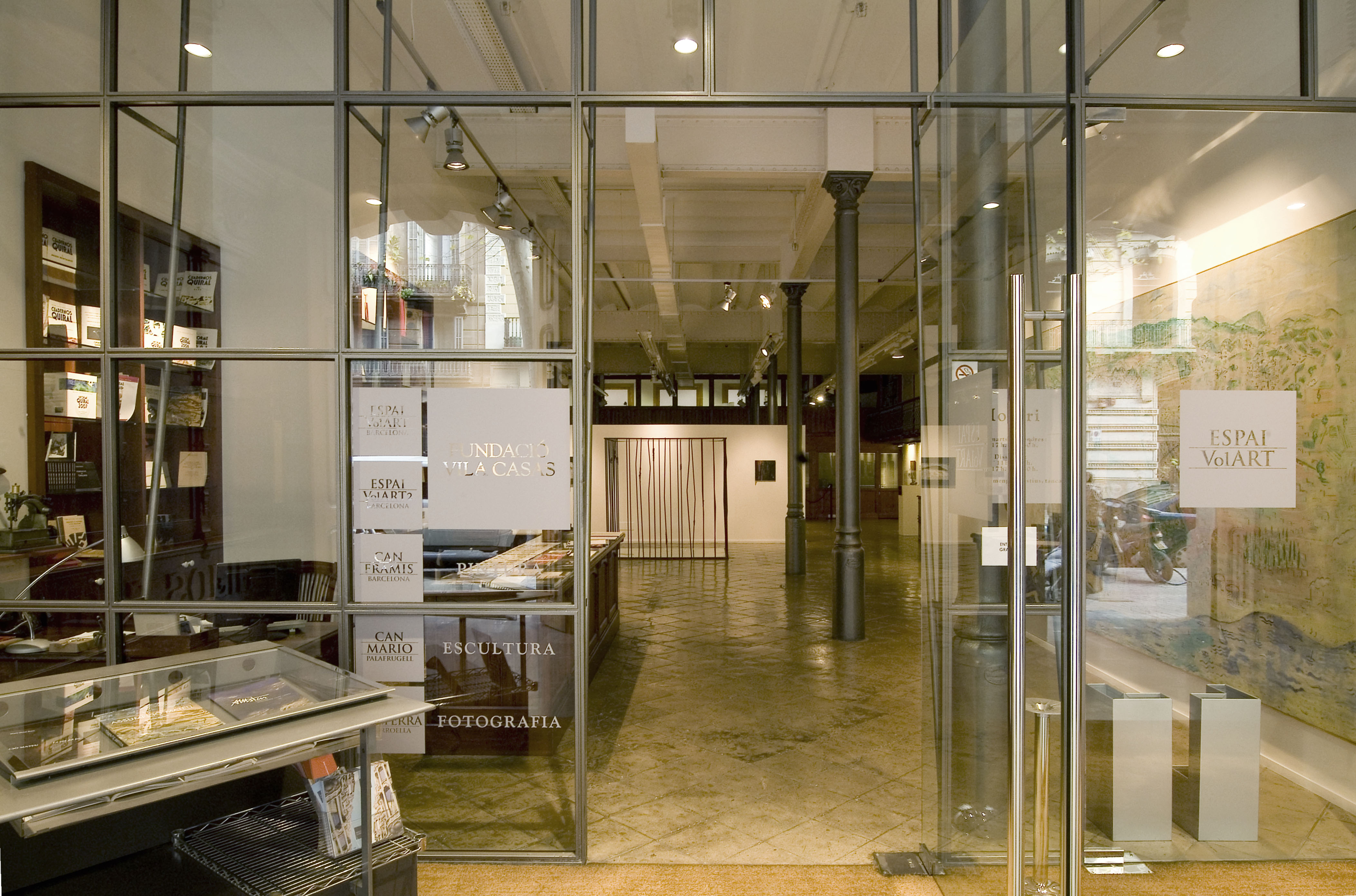
Espai Volart 2, one of the two art spaces that Fundació Vila Casas has in Barcelona.

1. Casa Manel Felip, headquarters of the Vila Casas Foundation. Since 1998, the headquarters of the Fundació Vila Casas have been located on the first floor of the Modernist building Casa Felip, at Ausiàs Marc Street, number 20, Barcelona. Originally it was the residence of the Felip family, who commissioned the architect Telm Fernández to build it in 1901. Years later it was designated a site of local cultural heritage by the Barcelona city council. Presently the first floor housing the Fundació Vila Casas is not open to the public, but it can be visited with the purchase of the catalogue of the Fundació Vila Casas.
2. Espai Volart. A space for temporary exhibitions of artists featured in the collection. In 2002, it was the foundation's first art space to open its doors to the public in Barcelona. It is located in the old storerooms of the Modernist building Casa Antonia Puget, on Ausiàs Marc 22, and was declared a site of local cultural heritage by the Barcelona city council. It was built in 1904 by the architects Roc Cot i Cot and Ramon Viñolas. Every July the Patrim exhibitions, shows of work by students finishing Fine Arts at Barcelona University, are held at Espai Volart, as well as an exhibition of a selection of works from the Ynglada-Guillot drawing prize and the award ceremony.
3. Espai Volart 2. A space that holds temporary exhibitions by well-known artists whose work falls into one of the three disciplines of the collection: contemporary painting, photography or sculpture. Unlike Espai Volart, which concentrates exclusively on artists from the collection, Espai Volart 2 presents the work of artists well known in the Catalan art world. Espai Volart 2 was opened in 2008 and is located in the old storerooms of the Modernista building Casa Felip, at Ausiàs Marc 20, Barcelona. It was constructed in 1901 by the architect Telm Fernández. At the beginning of the 1980s it was declared a site of local cultural heritage by the Barcelona city council.
4. Can Mario. Can Mario is the Fundació Vila Casas Museum of Contemporary Sculpture in Palafrugell (Costa Brava). It was opened in 2004. It has around 220 works on show dating from the 1960s to the present day by a wide range of artists born or living in Catalonia. Temporary exhibitions are also held every year. Can Mario was a cork factory dating from the early 20th century and was one of the buildings of the Miquel, Vincke and Meyer cork company. Since April 2011, 33 sculptures by artists from the Empordà region of Catalonia have been placed in the Gardens of Can Mario as permanent open air exhibits. In October of the same year, the Empordà Room was opened in the Museum, for holding temporary exhibitions of artists from the region.
5. Palau Solterra Museum, Torroella de Montgrí. Palau Solterra is the Fundació Vila Casa's Museum of Contemporary Photography (national and international), located in the town of Torroella de Montgrí in the Empordà region of Catalonia. It was opened in 2000. There are presently approximately 200 contemporary photographs on display by artists from around the world. Palau Solterra is a 15th-century palace that was the ancestral home of the Counts of Torroella de Montgrí. As well as the permanent collection, temporary exhibitions and a cycle of conferences on history and humanities are held annually.
