= Palau Solterra Museum =

Contemporary photography museum located in Spain

Coordinates: 42.0416°N 3.1261°E

The Palau Solterra Museum is one of the cultural centers of the Vila Casas Foundation located, located in the palace of the same name in Torroella de Montgrí (Girona), a town of the Baix Empordà region. It opened in 2000, and nowadays it houses about three hundred contemporary photographs of the city, artists from various parts of the world, including Chema Madoz, Alberto García Álix, Toni Catany, Otto Lloyd, Xavier Miserachs, Ouka Lele and Frank Horvat, among many others.

Annual exhibitions are organized and a series of conferences on history and humanities.

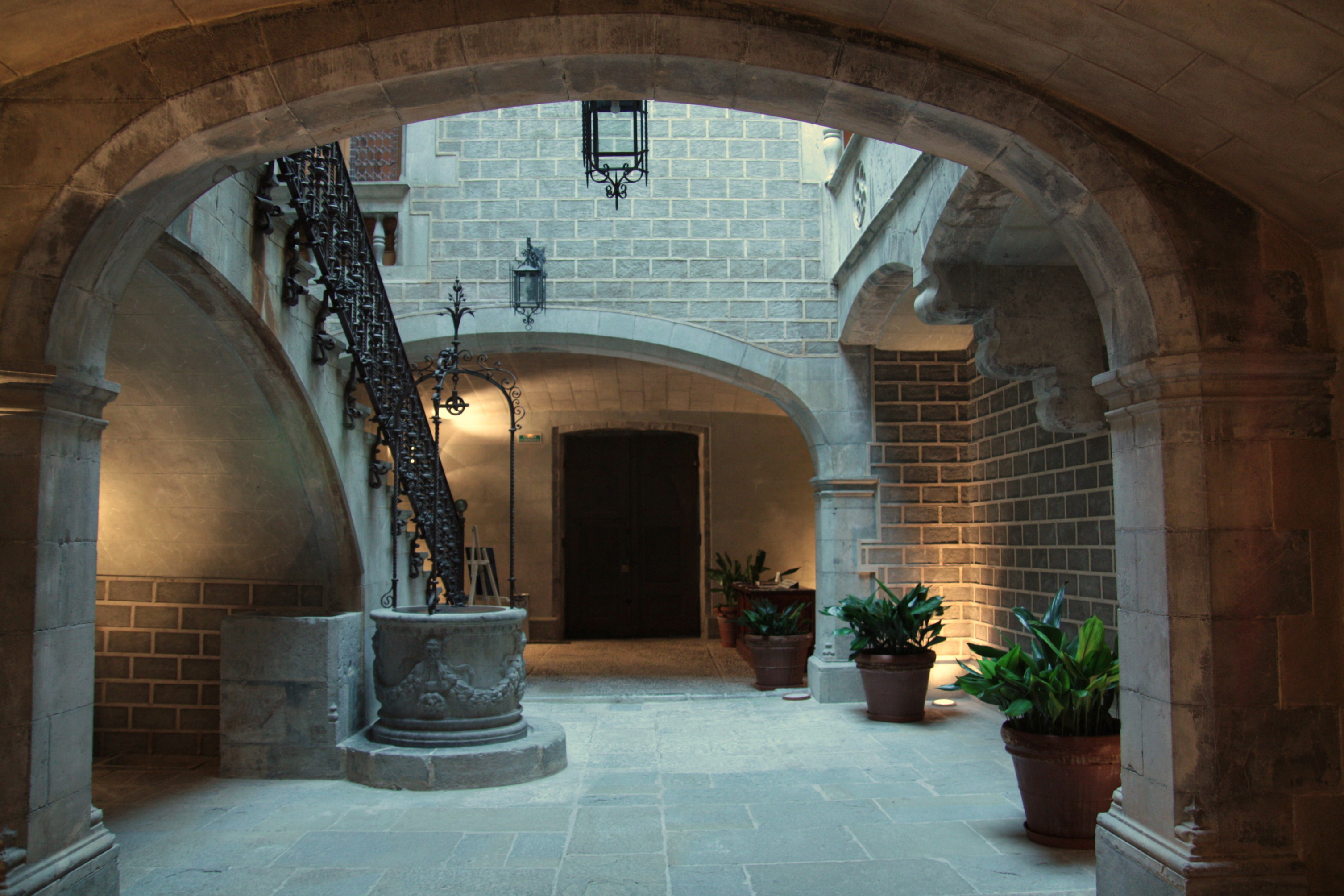
The Palau Solterra Museum

== The building ==
The Palau Solterra was declared an artistic historical monument in 1981 and tt opened in 2000, first with a painting fund and later (and up to now) with the photographic collection of the Foundation Vila Casas.

The building presents a mixture of styles, but always linked to the local construction tradition. The predominance of Baroque or modern constructions have not erased primitive forms and Gothic or Renaissance elements. The history of its construction and remodeling is linked to the most notable families in the country, as well as to its prosperity and decadence.

The year exactly of its construction is unknown, but it can be dated between the end of the 14th century and the beginning of the 15th, by order of the old Pons family. In 1503, a descendant of this family, Antic Sarriera and Margarit, married Anna Beneta de Gurb, from Sant Hilari Sacalm and Mrs. of the Solterra Museum, thus joining the patrimony. From here comes the name of our palace. For the five following centuries, the Palau Solterra was the scene of all kinds of luxury, thanks to the presence of several important and prominent families in that region.

During the Civil War (1936-1939) the palace was empty and uninhabited, although some rooms were used to carry out some activities such as the distribution of letters of rationing to the people of Torroella de Montgrí. In the sixties the ground floor was rehabilitated as a cultural center of private initiative, calling it the Palace of the Castle of the Mystery. Later, the city council of Torroella acquired it and took advantage of the building as a meeting place for youth. But the rapid deterioration of the palace caused it to be closed due to security problems. Finally, it was in 1999 when it became part of the Vila Casas Private Foundation to rehabilitate it and make it suitable for converting it into what is currently a contemporary photography museum.

== The collection ==
Palau Solterra hosts the permanent collection of contemporary photography and temporary exhibitions, by national and international artists. The museum contains more than 300 contemporary photographs exposed and it has become one of the most important photography museums on a state level.

=== Permanent exhibition ===
The exhibition is presented with a studied museum criterion that allows the visitor multiple readings suggested by the same collection, through an open and plural route. The permanent exhibition does not follow a chronological order because the thread is the modernity seen through the visual and documentary processes of the different works.

=== Temporary exhibitions ===
Temporary exhibitions take place in the rooms on the ground floor. In addition, it is also where the winners and selected of the Vila Casas Foundation photography contest summons to discover, project and promote artists. On the same floor we find the auditorium, where other activities such as conferences on history and humanities, or other activities are carried out closely linked to the cultural life of the people and the territory.

== Services ==
=== Educational Service ===
The Palau Solterra Museum offers educational dossiers about the collection to the tutors, so they can prepare their visits.

=== Guided Tours ===
The Museum also has a guided tours service, which are updated based on the annual changes that take place in the exhibitions.

- Guided visits for adults with reservation: visit to the permanent exhibition, visit to the temporary exhibition or visit commented by specialists on the architectural space.

- Guided tours of Courtesy: Guided tour of the permanent exhibition included with the ticket entrance, every Saturday and Sunday at 12:00 a.m.

== Spaces related ==
Can Framis Museum is the latest Fundació Vila Casas museum, an art center devoted to the promotion of contemporary Catalan painting. Located in the old Can Framis factory complex, the museum displays more than 250 paintings from the sixties up to the present made by artists born or currently living in Catalonia. In addition to the permanent collection which is divided in three floors, Can Framis Museum also has an area dedicated to temporary exhibitions named Espai Aø. They update their permanent collection periodically and every three months they open two new temporary exhibitions.

Espai Volart. A space for temporary exhibitions of artists featured in the collection. In 2002 it was the foundation's first art space to open its doors to the public in Barcelona. It is located in the old storerooms of the Modernist building Casa Antonia Puget, on Ausiàs Marc 22, and was declared a site of local cultural heritage by the Barcelona city council. It was built in 1904 by the architects Roc Cot i Cot and Ramon Viñolas. Every July the Patrim exhibitions, shows of work by students finishing Fine Arts at Barcelona University, are also held at Espai Volart, as well as an exhibition of a selection of works from the Ynglada-Guillot drawing prize and the award ceremony.

Espai Volart 2. A space that holds temporary exhibitions by well-known artists whose work falls into one of the three disciplines of the collection: contemporary painting, photography or sculpture. Unlike Espai Volart, which concentrates exclusively on artists from the collection, Espai Volart 2 presents the work of artists well known in the Catalan art world. Espai Volart 2 was opened in 2008 and is located in the old storerooms of the Modernista building Casa Felip, at Ausiàs Marc 20, Barcelona. It was constructed in 1901 by the architect Telm Fernández. At the beginning of the 1980s it was declared a site of local cultural heritage by the Barcelona city council.

Can Mario Museum. Can Mario is the Fundació Vila Casas Museum of Contemporary Sculpture in Palafrugell (Costa Brava). It was opened in 2004. It has around 220 works on show dating from the 1960s to the present day by a wide range of artists born or living in Catalonia. Temporary exhibitions are also held every year. Can Mario was a cork factory dating from the early 20th century and was one of the buildings of the Miquel, Vincke and Meyer cork company. Since April 2011, 33 sculptures by artists from the Empordà region of Catalonia have been placed in the Gardens of Can Mario as permanent open air exhibits. In October of the same year the Empordà Room was opened in the Museum, for holding temporary exhibitions of artists from the region.
