= Laurent Jiménez-Balaguer =

French painter (1928–2015)

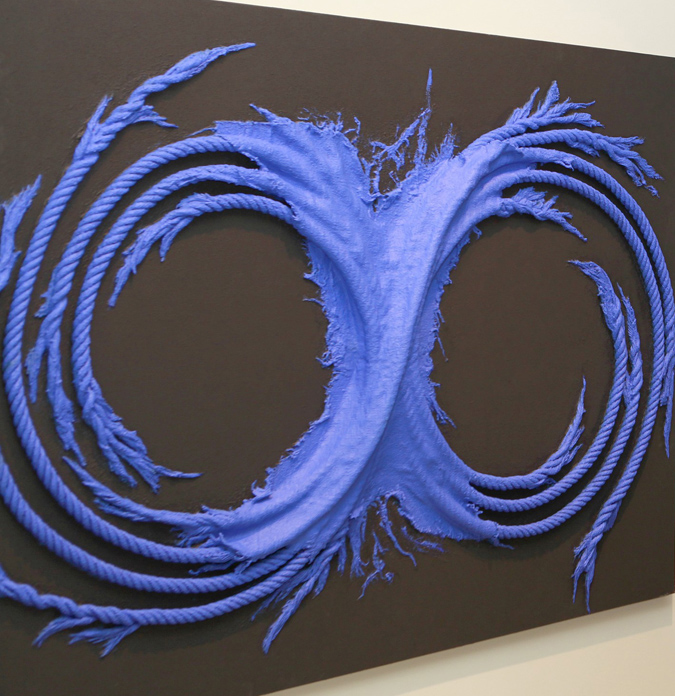
- Jiménez-Balaguer From Infinity to Infinity 2011
- Born: Llorenç Jiménez-Balaguer; 14 January 1928; Barcelona, Catalonia, Spain
- Died: 16 April 2015 (aged 87)
- Known for: painting
- Notable work: Clotted Memory, Through the Mirror N°23, The Crack of the World, What's hiding ?
- Movement: Abstract Expressionism, Informalism, Humanism, Poststructuralism, Postmodernism, New Informalism
- Website: https://laurentjimenezbalaguer.com/

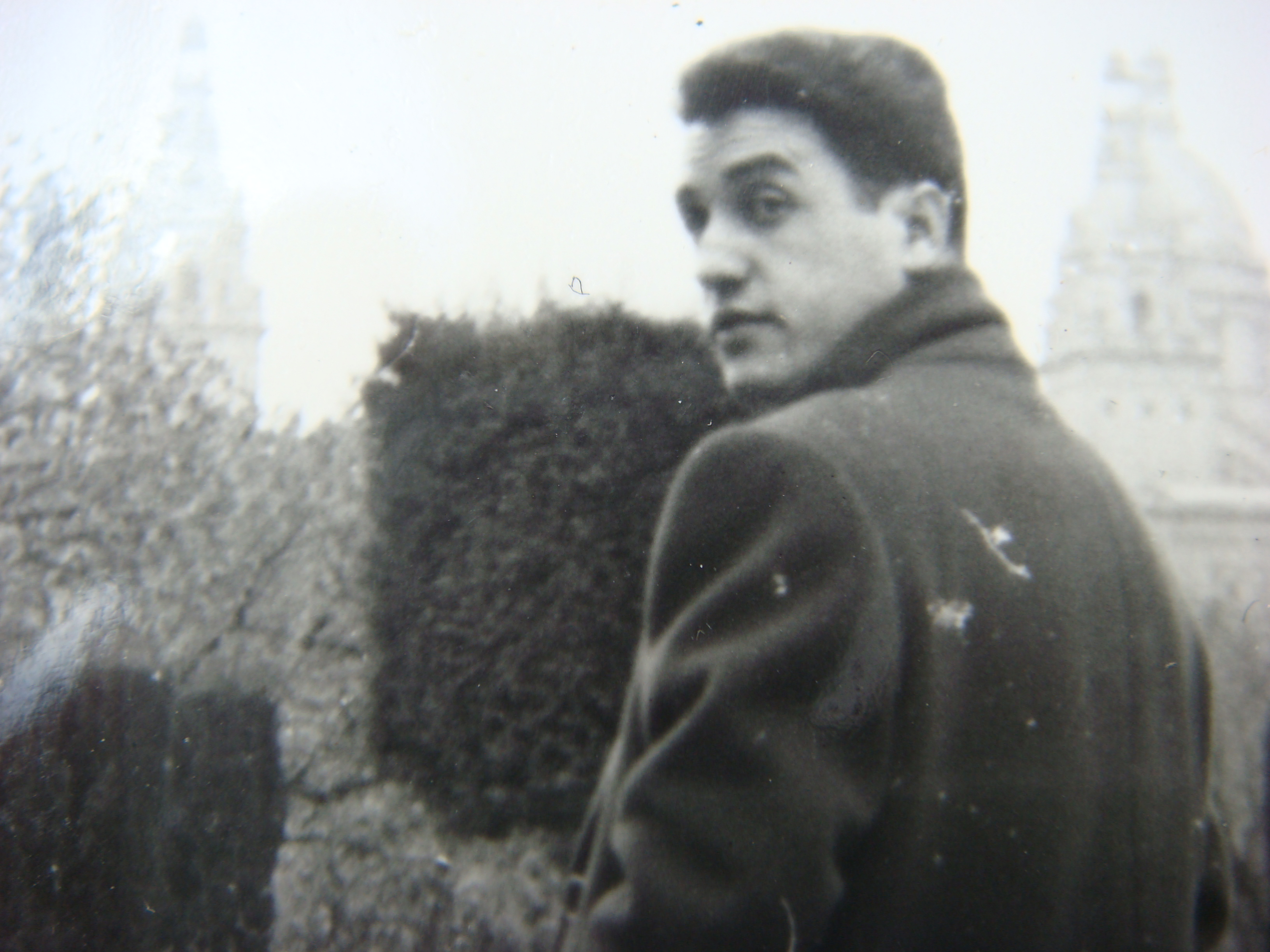
Jiménez-Balaguer in Paris in 1961

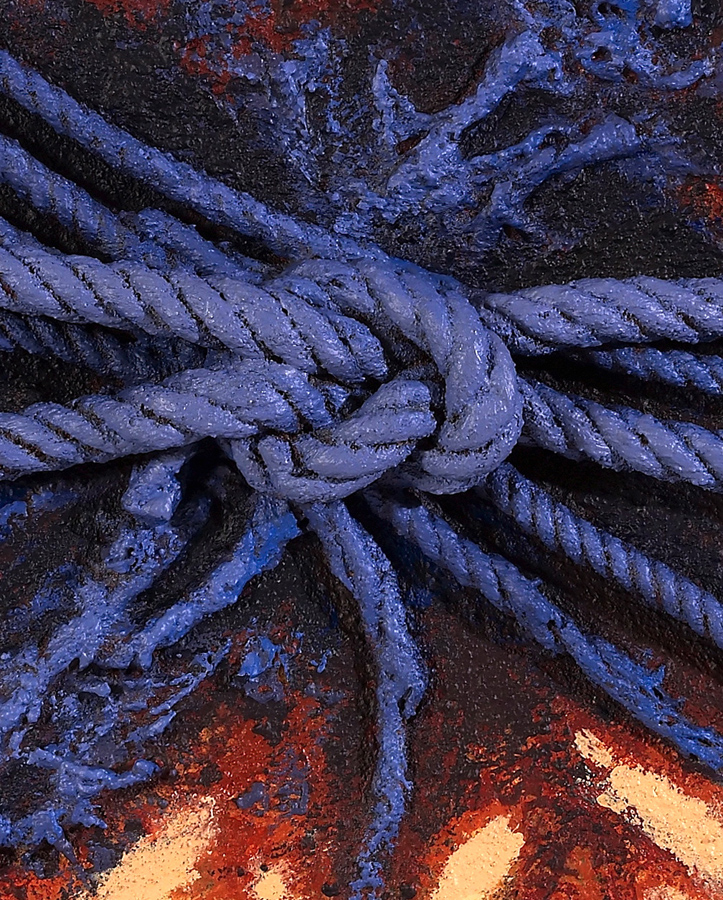
Jiménez-Balaguer Detail 2010

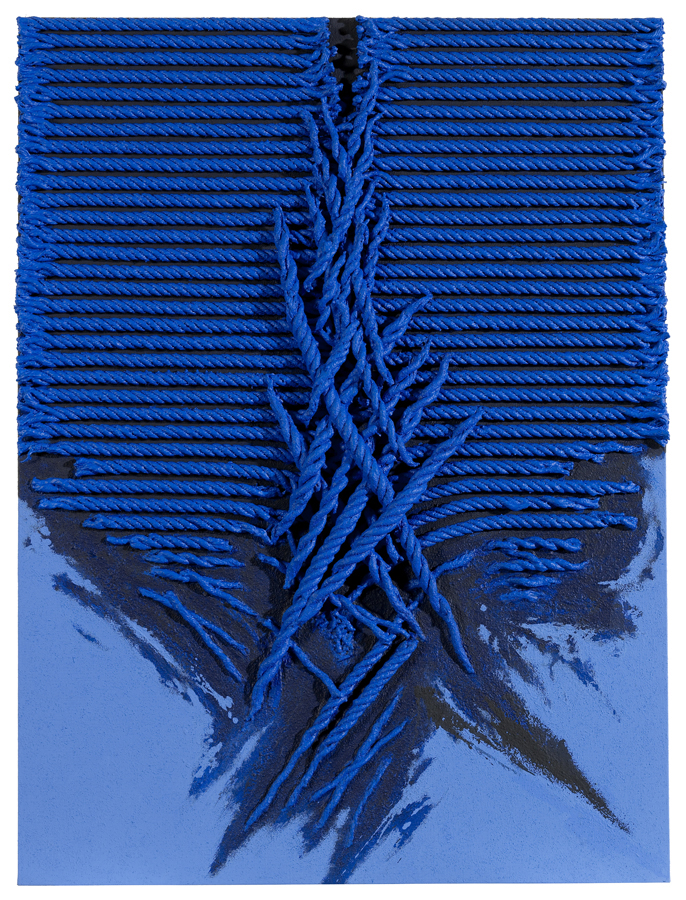
Jiménez-Balaguer Black Block 2009

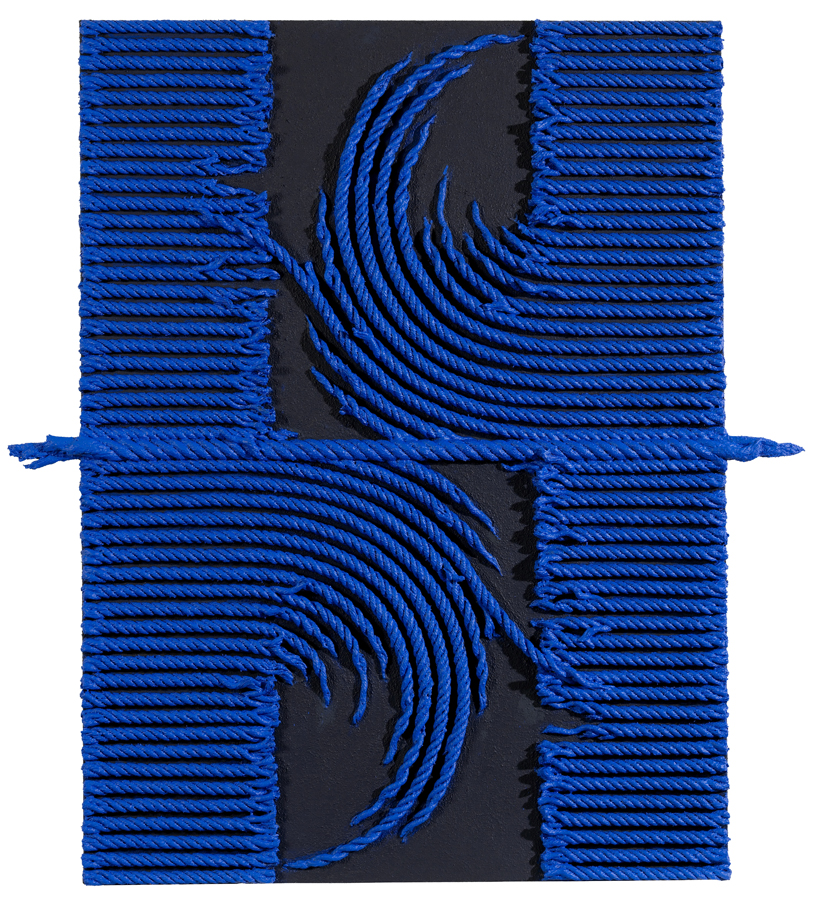
Jiménez-Balaguer I Want Equality 2009

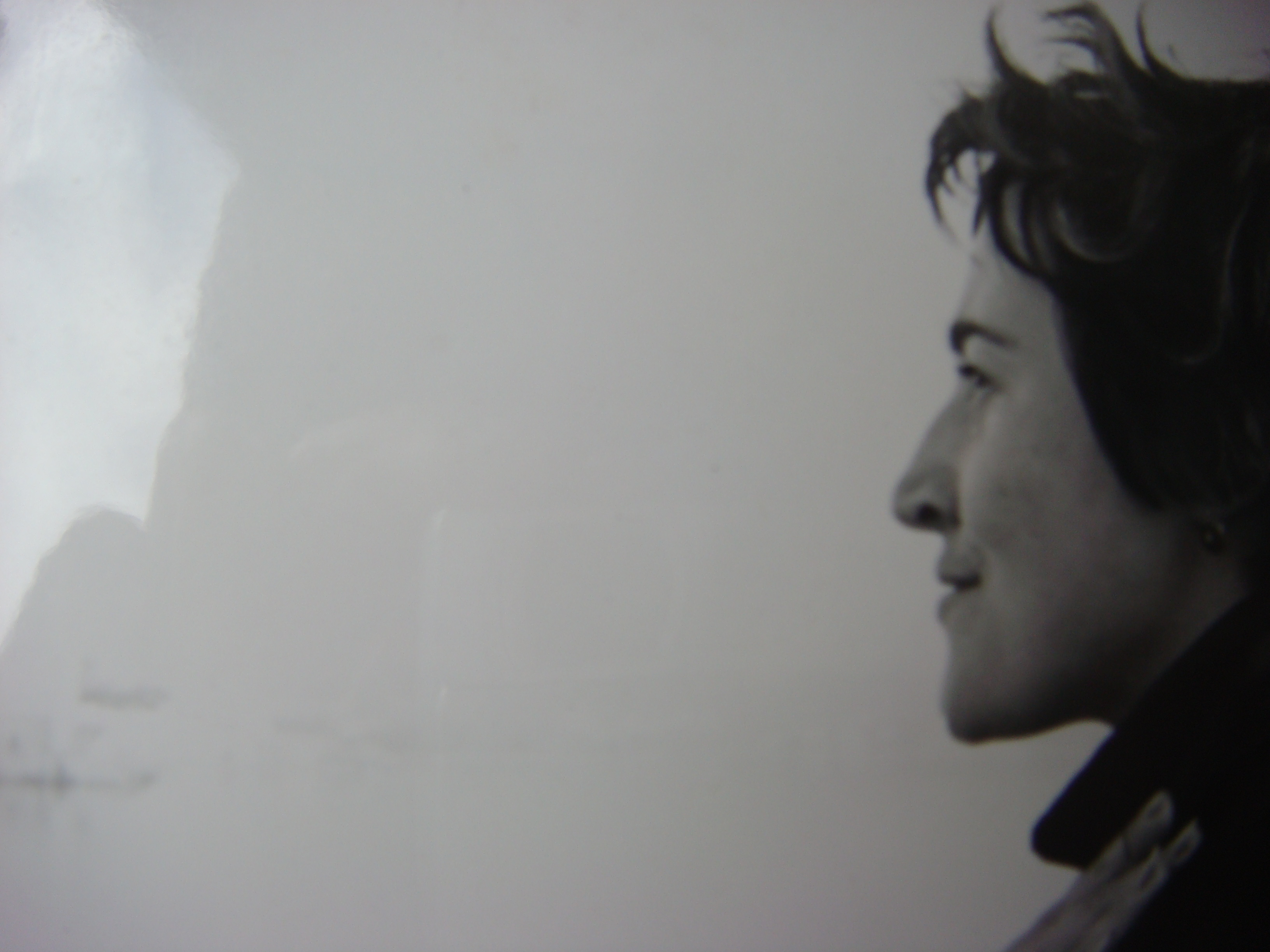
Maria Teresa Andreu in Paris in 1961

Laurent Jiménez-Balaguer (14 January 1928 – 16 April 2015) Born in L’Hospitalet del Llobregat, Barcelona (Catalonia), Spain. He lived and worked in Paris. During the 1950s, he was one of the most distinguished painters of Catalan art, known for creating a private language. He belonged to the Abstract Expressionism and European Informalism. These postmodern vanguardists have been characterized by their multiculturalism, manifested in their contrasting pictorial textures, and the need to invent a new mindset.

Jiménez-Balaguer's purpose was to establish a framework of knowledge of the human psyche based on Ferdinand de Saussure's language model, in order to show how painting is a universal medium for the understanding of the Self. He regarded the construct of the Self as indispensable, and its visualization as vital; the human inner is neither an impalpable, untouchable soul nor an invisible, immaterial ego.

His conception of creation and society involves him in a process of a permanent revolution, from which the subject must struggle for the construction of the Self.

His work asserts that the Self is a performative act. Jose María Moreno Galván in 1960 considered him one of the twenty most talented painters of Contemporary Catalan Art.
Two fundamental archetypes structure his field: the Body-Memory and the Exterior-Interior.

== Early years ==
Early on, Jiménez-Balaguer paints androgynous figures that exude a metaphysical sentiment.

His portraits emphasize what is within, unmarked by gender or cultural identity. Like El Greco, one of his artistic references, he seeks the transcendental essence of being. In 1955, he abandons all description of the world in order to focus on the problem of transforming the invisible to visible. He considers that painting allows for true knowledge of oneself, with the projection of raw material.

Following the parameters of Western philosophy, he thinks that all expression is an expression of something; therefore, the sign refers to a reality that constructs the object at the same time as the meaning.
According to this tradition, everything is related and has its corresponding channels: everything is connected and meaning is constructed by analogy.

His concept of Other Reality arises from here, as well as his work regarding boundaries and the concept of limit.

The real, understood symbolically, is found between the Interior and the Exterior, between Corporality and Memory. One of his most important contribution to Catalan Informalism and 21st century painting is referencing this 'Other Reality' as a linguistic-pictorial sign.
During these formative years, surrounded by political turmoil, he actively participates in the recognition of a Catalan identity. He learns to write in his language, Catalan, which was prohibited in Francoist Spain.
It is years of experimentation for the painter as he works on the hidden matter, that which one keeps inside one's psyche: the fragile and subjective.
Jiménez-Balaguer believes: "That which is sensed is a reflection of the intelligible", and he does not cease searching for the fundamental concept of individuation and independence.

=== Catalan Lyrical Abstraction ===
At the age of twenty, he goes to the mountains of the monastery in Montserrat and begins to paint with his friend, Josep Guinovart, experimenting a new freedom and liberating himself of the contingency of convention. He meets Cesáreo Rodríguez-Aguilera and his wife Mercedes de Prat, and a close friendship ensues.
He publishes a manifesto, He Escuchado, whereby he defines his aspirations along the vein of Stanley Cavell: 'Claim is what a voice does when it founds within itself in order to establish a universal assertion.'

His sensibilities are along the lines of Merleau-Ponty regarding his defense of the body as the subject, and Wittgenstein: 'The human body is the best image of the human soul.'
He exhibits in Ciclo Experimental d’Art Nou directed by Josep Maria de Sucre i de Grau and Angel Marsá and his paintings enrich the contemporary Catalan art scene. At the Galería Clan in Madrid, he receives the invaluable support of Manolo Millares, El Paso (grupo) and César Manrique, the latter becoming a good friend and inviting him to continue their contact. The goal is to impede the obstruction of expression and obtain total freedom of the Self. In 1956, the art critic Juan-Eduardo Cirlot includes him in the Art Informal movement.
Catalan identity is in search of specificity, and is in opposition to the official art sanctioned by Francoist Spain. The painters of the 20th century, mainly Joan Miró, insist on the need for a new art.
In 1957, in the European May Salons, intellectuals such as Antoni Tàpies and Laurent Jiménez-Balaguer, present their latest works. All the Informalist painters evince a critical vision against a world of oppression and exclusion, dominated by diverse imperialisms.

=== Informalism and Information ===
In the 1970s, in dialogue with the poststructuralist period, he continues to explore the possibilities of a knowledge of the Self. From then on, his work heralds a new period based on the understanding of the problem of human expression and its inabilities, inhibitions, prohibitions, and negations; Jiménez-Balaguer's paintings are a projection of the visualization of the unknown Inner.
In spite of the abstraction of the images, he finds no reason they would be mysterious, magical nor mute; instead, they should be able to communicate meaning. The utility of a sign, is its power to give universal information that allows giving the subject more power.

Although, Inform in Catalan language, is that which has no form, Jiménez-Balaguer chooses to investigate the second meaning of the word. As all words, 'inform' is not a univocal concept but a polysemous one. 'Inform' is also an exhaustive and organized exposition regarding a topic.
Therefore, according to Jiménez-Balaguer, Informal is telling information that still has no form, and Informalism is the science of the formation of the meaning. Informalism becomes, from this perspective, the artistic current that visualizes the space where significance is built.

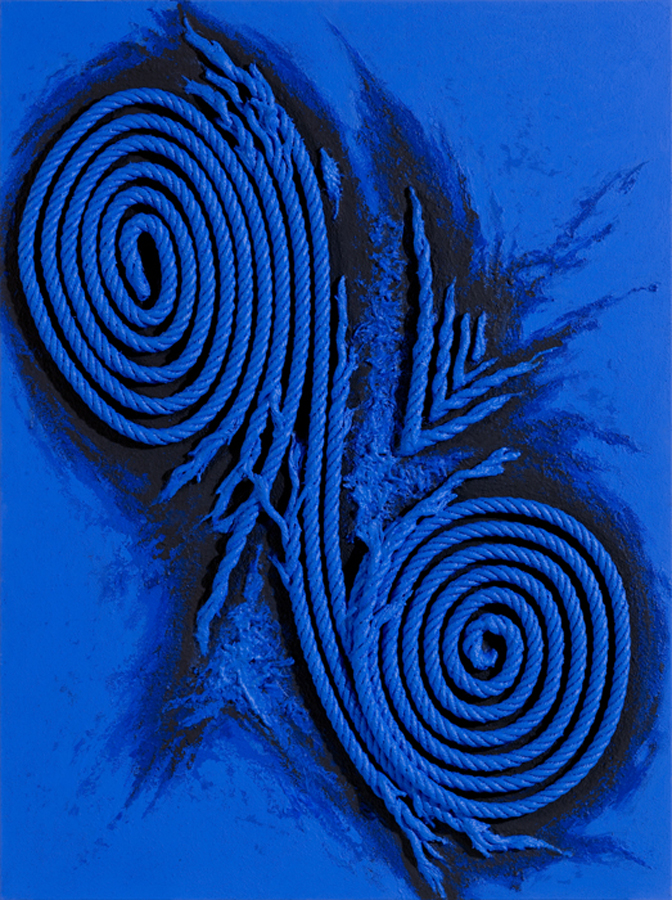
Jiménez-Balaguer You and Me 2010

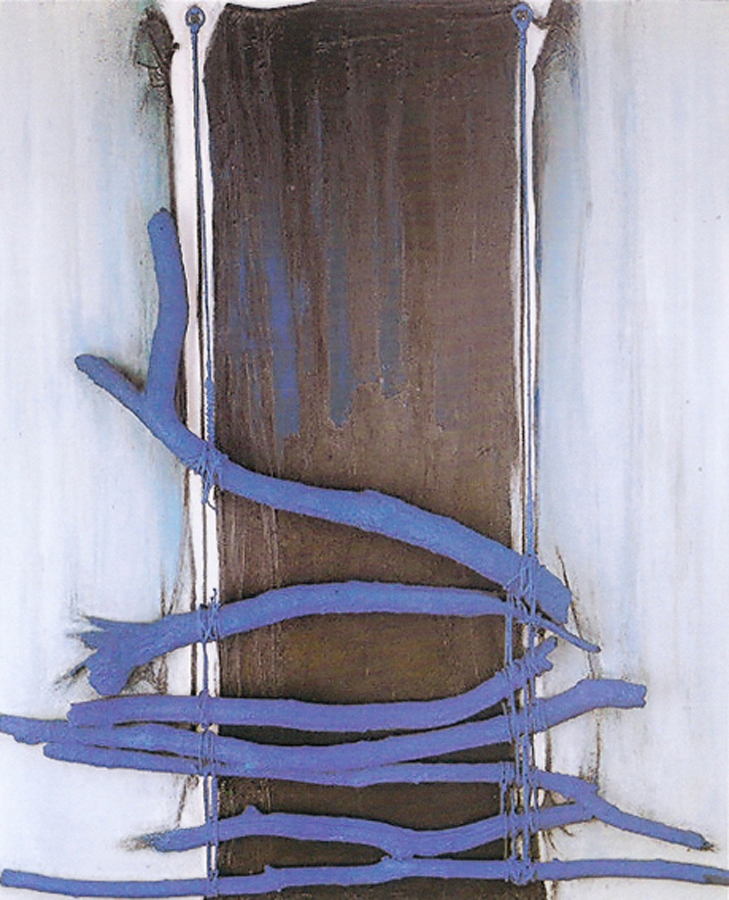
Jiménez-Balaguer Untitled 1988

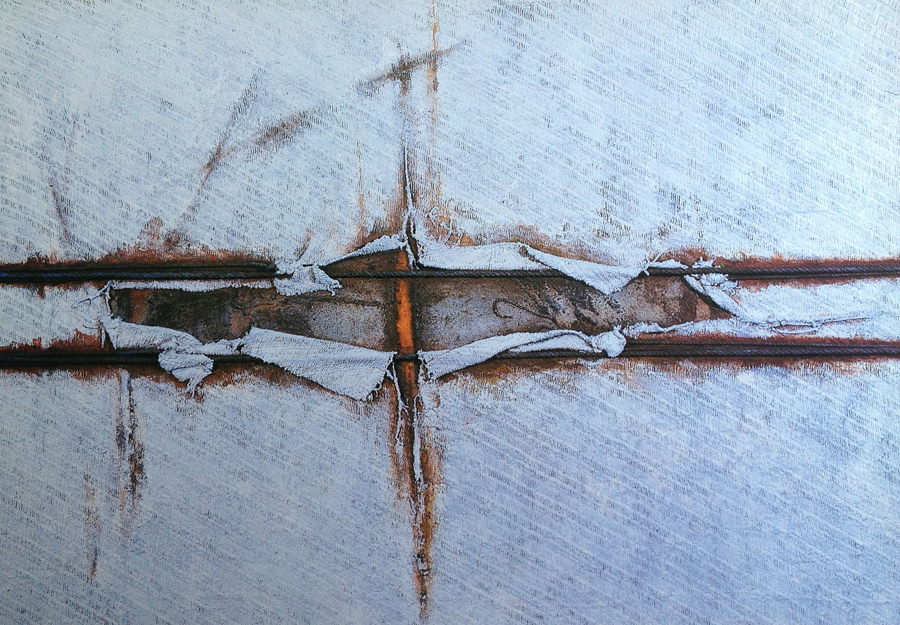
Jiménez-Balaguer Outside-Inside 1995

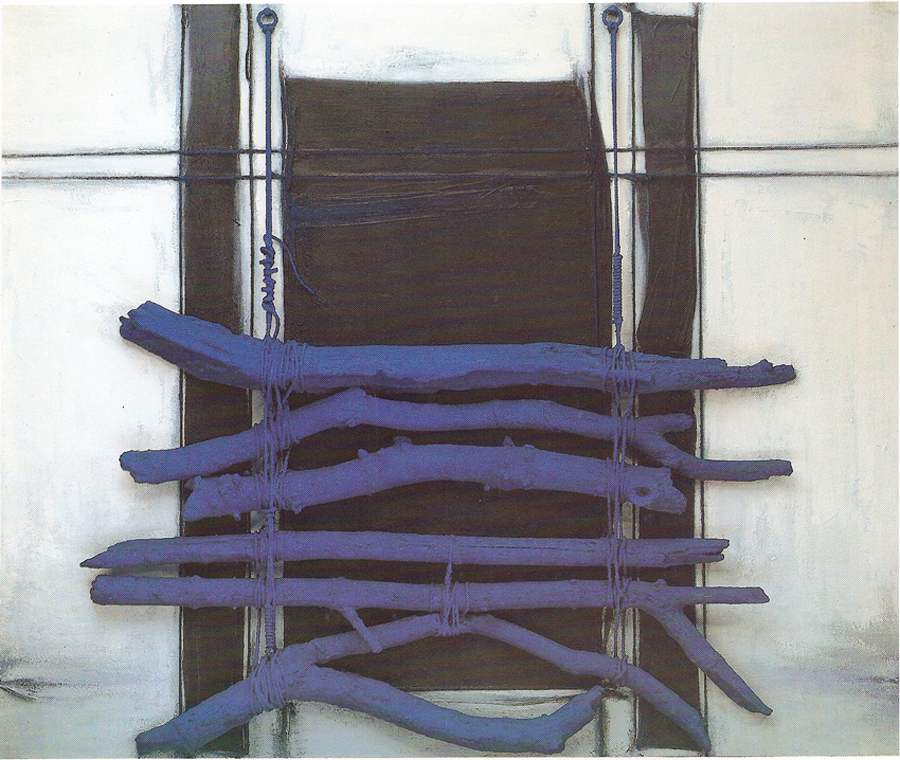
Jiménez-Balaguer Other Reality 1987

=== In Defense of Subjectivity ===
His work demonstrates a deep respect for vulnerability. It is constructed as a critique against contemporary society that produces the destruction of subjectivity. During these years, Jiménez-Balaguer concerns himself with the power of painting as force.
He thinks that the informalist image bears witness to a semiotic pre-symbolic memory.
It is during this time that he frees himself from the destruction of the 1950s and the scratchings of postwar Informalism, in order to step into the 21st century.

As such, after the amputations, the fragmentation of the image, the details of the wound, the assimilation of negativity and violence exercised against the matter of the Self, there is the human psyche that is capable of reconstructing itself.
Jiménez-Balaguer focuses his art on the transformation of violence into Form.

=== Constitution of a universal language of the Self ===
During the 1960s, Jiménez-Balaguer and his wife María Teresa Andreu (Mery) relocate to Paris and establish themselves in the intellectual milieu. They have four children, Cristian, Virginie, Valérie and Eric. He meets the Parisian jeweler, Jean Vendome.
In 1961, he is introduced to Antoni Clavé and Stephen Spender from Gallery Saint-Germain. From then on and for the next twenty years, he develops a language of signs able to communicate the universal language of the Self.
As such, it is a deconstruction of the idea that a private language cannot be understood by another.

For Jiménez-Balaguer, the Inner has as a destiny: universal communication. In 1986, he meets Michel Tapié, the originator of the concept 'Art Autre' and he is introduced to Rodolphe Stadler.
From 1988 onward, he introduces a series of objects of the world in order to express the inward. His paintings become an enunciation with branches, ropes, cloth, grids, and nails.

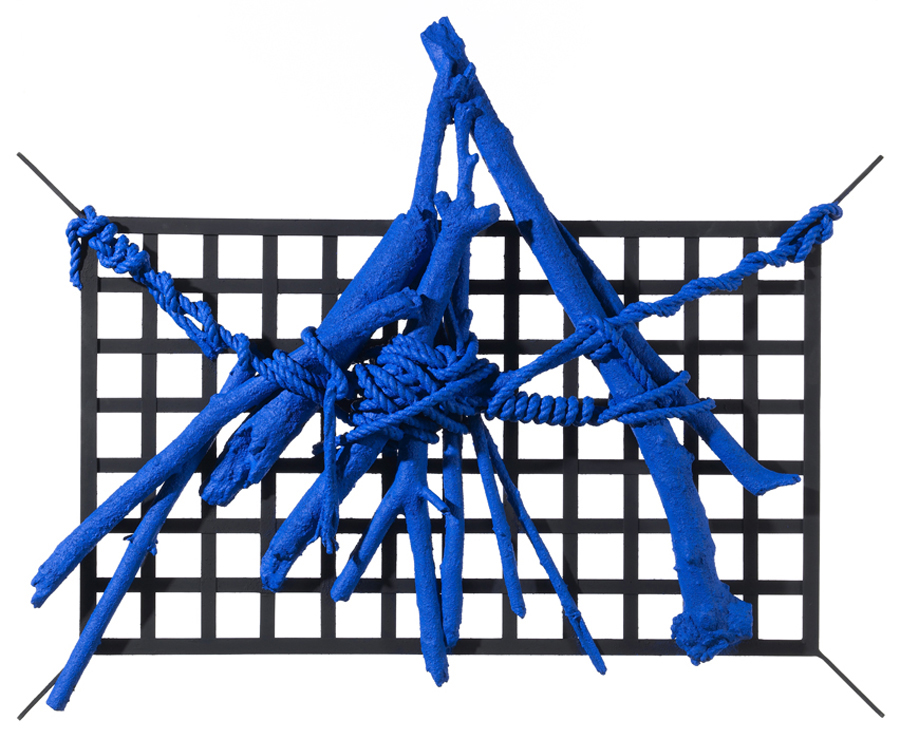
Jiménez-Balaguer Blue Intervals 1988

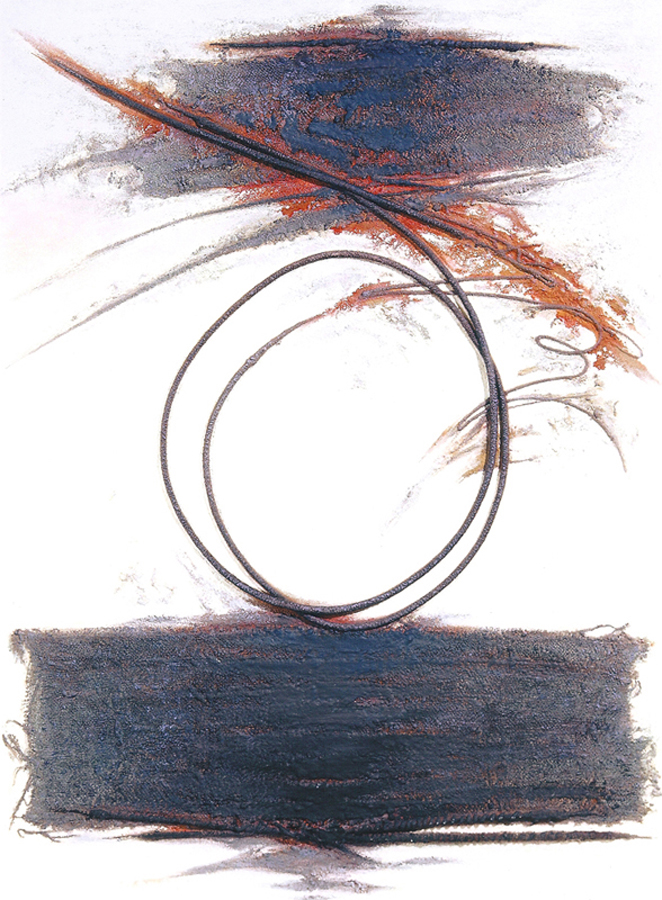
Jiménez-Balaguer Imagining the Impossible 1993

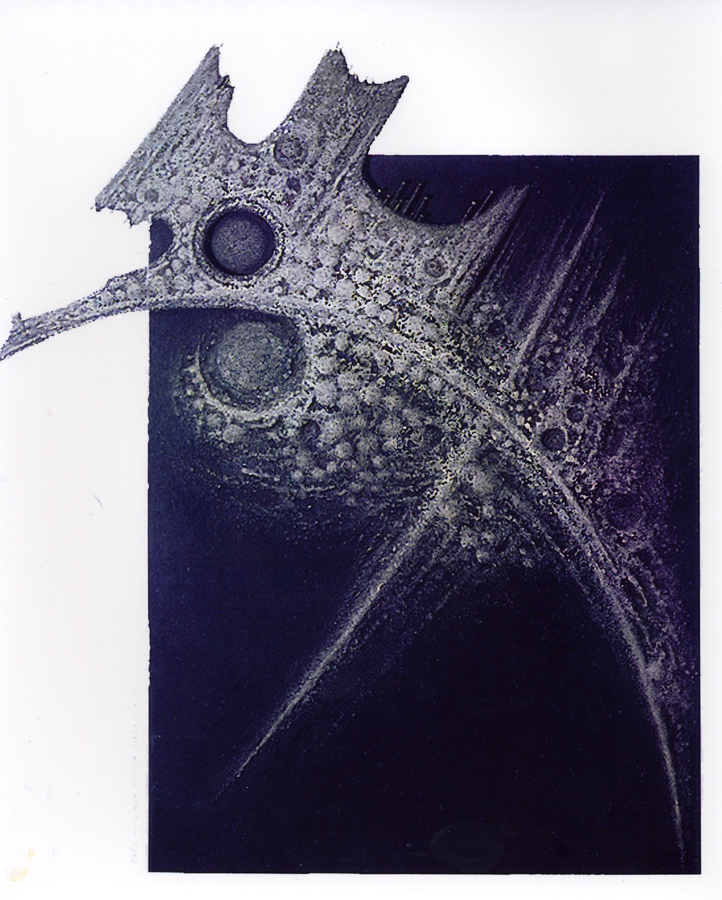
Jiménez-Balaguer Cosmic Vertigo 1979

=== Painting as interface ===
Jiménez-Balaguer's work gains the approbation and support of Pierre Restany and is introduced to Joan Hernández-Pijuan at the Galeria Calart Actual in Geneva.

From 1990, Laurent Jiménez-Balaguer devises the first system of signs for a universal language of the Inner. Each painting becomes the space for the visualization of the universal language of the Self from which the construction of the subject is confirmed.
His work questions the classic attributes of the subject: time, acquired memory, and suffering. His works enquire on such elements.

In 2000, he begins his philosophical dialogues with Alexis Virginie Jimenez on Catalan Art and Informalism; together, they create the artistic movement known as New Informalism. The movement begins in the year 2000 in his studio in Chevry II, in Gif sur Yvettes.
The theoretical base is related to the New Cultural studies. Alexis Virginie Jimenez's art videos, ‘Interventions’, are taped there.

Jiménez-Balaguer's work shares certain core values intrinsic to the field of Cultural studies and the theoretical struggle of intellectuals such as Julia Kristeva, Jacques Derrida, Gilles Deleuze, Jacques Lacan, Michel Foucault, Alexis Virginie Jimenez, Judith Butler.
The artist questions what to do with the cardinal points of Western metaphysics and how to interpret a new vision of the human identity.

=== Artwork : Universal graphic lexicon ===
The ropes: symbolize the ties that unite the invisible Inner of man to the universal Totality. 'The rope is an emblematic material of the road that brings the artist to the territory of Informalism's Art Autre.'

Blue branches: symbol of the wanderings of the soul and its realization in a unitarian form.

The knots: these are psycho-noetic strokes of subjective elaboration.

== Principal exhibitions ==
2023

Which humanity ? Existential figurations in the post-war period (1940-1966), MNAC, Barcelona – Spain Expository commissioner Alex Mitrani, text Boris Cyrulnik

2016

L'Hospitalet remembers Jiménez-Balaguer, Tecla Sala Art Center, L'Hospitalet de Llobregat - Spain - Expository commissioner Antoni Perna, text 'Towards what kind of Humanity?' Alexis Virginie Jimenez

2015

Allò sagrat de Jiménez-Balaguer - obras 1956-2014, Montserrat Art Museum, Barcelona, Spain

2014

La memòria de la matèria, Hospitalet Museum, L’Harmonia - Art center - L’Hospitalet de Llobregat, Spain

2012

Cicle Invasions Subtils amb Laurent Jiménez-Balaguer, Fundació Espai Guinovart, Agramunt – Catalonia – Spain - expository commissioner and text Syvia Muñoz

2012

L’Emergència del Signe, Museo Can Framis, Fundació Vila Casas, Barcelona – Catalonia – Spain

2010

"El Cos d’una memòria", Galeria Art Vall, Andorra la Vella – Andorra

2010

"Le Nœud", Galerie Saint Cyr, Rouen – France

2007

"Cuerpo de una memoria", Galeria Calart Actual, Segovia – Spain

2006

"L'au-delà du miroir", Galerie Guislain-États d'Art, Paris – France

2003

"Œuvres de 1960 à 1962" et "Souvenirs enfouis", Rétrospective, Galerie Guislain-États d'Art, Paris – France

2002

"Traces d'une mémoire", Centre d'Études Catalanes, Paris – France

2000

"Exposition", Galerie Guislain-États d'Art, Paris – France

1999

"2000 ans de quoi ?", Galerie Lina Davidov, Paris – France

1999

"2000 ans de quoi ?", Grand Théâtre d’Angers, Angers – France

1998

"Dedans/Dehors", La Corderie Royale, Rochefort – France

1998

MPT Courdimanche, Les Ulis – France

1997

"Images d'une mémoire", Les Cordeliers, Châteauroux – France

1997

Galerie Lina Davidov, Paris – France

1996

Galerie Finartis, Zug – Switzerland

1995

Galerie Calart, Genève – Switzerland

1994

Galerie Rami, Zurich – Switzerland

1994

Galerie Lina Davidov, Paris – France

1993

Galerie Adriana Schmidt, Cologne – Germany

1992

Galerie Lina Davidov, Paris – France

1992

Galerie Adriana Schmidt, Stuttgart – Germany

1991

Centre d'Art Contemporain, Corbeil-Essonnes – France

1991

Galerie Claude Samuel, Paris – France

1991

Galerie Rami, Zurich – Switzerland

1990

Galerie Calart, Genève – Switzerland

1989

Galerie Claude Samuel, Paris – France

1987

"Réalité autre", Galerie Claude Samuel, Paris – France

1985

Paris Art Center, Paris – France

1984

Grand Orient de France, Paris – France

1982

International Arts Gallery, Chicago – United States

1981

Galerie Vienner, Paris – France

1980

Galerie Vienner, Paris – France

1980

Musée Napoléonien, Antibes-Golfe-Juan – France

1979

Galerie Vienner, Paris – France

1977

Réalisation de huit grandes créations murales pour le Centre Hospitalier de Creil, Creil – France

1969

Dayton's Gallery 12, Minneapolis – United States

1963

Joachim Gallery, Chicago – United States

1961

Galerie Saint-Germain, Paris – France

1961

Savage Gallery, London – United Kingdom

1961

Galerie Toulouse, Copenhagen – Denmark

1959

Galerie J.C. de Chaudun, Paris – France

1959

Galerie Mistral, Brussels – Belgium

1959

Centre Culturel et Artistique d'Uccle, Brussels – Belgium

1957

Club Universitari de València, Valencia – Spain

1957

Galeria d'Art Jaimes, Barcelona – Catalonia – Spain

1956

Galeria Clan, Madrid – Spain

1956

Galeria d'Art Quint, Palma de Mallorca – Balearic Islands – Spain

1955

"Ciclo Experimental d’Art Nou", Galeries Jardin, Barcelona – Catalonia – Spain

1955

Galeries Laietanes, Barcelona – Catalonia – Spain

1955

Galeria Sur, Santander – Spain

1952

Casino de Ripoll, Ripoll – Spain

== Retrospectives ==
- Fundació Vila Casas, Can Framis, Barcelona – Spain

== Museums/Public collections ==
- National Art Museum of Catalonia, Barcelona – Spain
- Museu de l’Hospitalet, Barcelona – Spain
- Museu de Montserrat, Barcelona – Spain
- Fundació Vila Casas, Barcelona – Spain
- Barcelona Museum of Contemporary Art, Museu d’Art Contemporani, Barcelona – Spain
- Fons d'Art de la Generalitat de Catalunya, Barcelona – Spain
- Museu de Ceràmicas, Manises – Spain
- Artecovi, Fundación, Madrid – Spain
- Musée de Chateauroux, France
- Musée municipal de Bourg-en-Bresse, France
- Musée d’Art et Histoire de Rochefort, Rochefort – France
- Grand Théâtre (Angers), France
- Centre d'art sacré contemporain de Lille, France

== Bibliography ==
- Roberta Bosco, "Recuperación de un olvidado", El País Barcelona 2012
- Montse Frisach, "Rescatat de l’oblit", El Punt/Avui, Barcelona 2012
- Natalia Farré, "Jiménez-Balaguer 55 años después", El Periodico, Barcelona 2012
- Toni Mata i Riu, "Força sìgnica", Regio 7, Barcelona 2012
- Albert Mercadé, "L’emergència del signe", Escrits Arts, Barcelona, Catalunya, 2012
- José Corredor Matheos, "El retorn del nostre Jiménez-Balaguer", Fundació Vila Casas, Barcelona 2012
- Joan Gil, "El paisatge de la memoria", Andorra 2010
- Tomás Paredes, "El arte sirve para ir mas alla de la muerte", Agora-El Punto, perfil L.Jiménez-Balaguer, Madrid 2007
- Tomás Paredes, "Jiménez-Balaguer, Cuerpo de una memoria", El Punto de las Artes, Madrid 2007
- Tomás Paredes, "La unión de lo telúrico y lo celestial", La Vanguardia, Barcelona, Madrid 2007
- Antonio Madrigal, "Desgarramiento necesario, pinturas de Jiménez-Balaguer", El Adelantado, Segovia, Spain 2007
- Lydia Harambourg, "L'au-delà du miroir", Le Magazine – de Musées en Galeries, Paris, France 2006
- Tomás Paredes, "El mas alla del espejo", El Punto de las Artes, Madrid 2006
- Tomás Paredes, "Jiménez-Balaguer, recuerdos escondidos", "El Punto de las Artes", Madrid 2003
- Lydia Harambourg, "Les signes telluriques de Laurent Jiménez-Balaguer", La Gazette Drouot, Paris, France
- Lydia Harambourg, "Jiménez-Balaguer", de Musées en Galeries, La Gazette Drouot, Paris 2002
- Tomás Paredes, "Jiménez-Balaguer, huellas de una memoria", El Punto de las Artes, Madrid, Spain
- Elisée Trenc, "Jiménez-Balaguer, l'élan vital", Paris, France
- Lydia Harambourg, "2000 ans de quoi ?", Grand Théâtre d'Angers, Claude Sabet Éditeur, Genève, 1999
- B. Guyomar, "Jiménez-Balaguer, cordes et âme", Courrier de l'Ouest, France
- Lydia Harambourg, La Gazette Drouot, Paris, France
- Michel Nuridsany, "Une ouverture", Les Cordeliers, Châteauroux, France 1997
- Kim Sang Ong-Van-Cung, "La figure de la création", Paris 1997
- Arthur et Yves Desclozeaux, "Au bout de la rue ... peintres et sculpteurs de Boulogne", Éditions Turbulences, 1992
- Chantal Cusin-Berche, "Le signe de l'absolu", France 1991
- Michel Giroud, "Le combat de la peinture, la peinture d'un combat", Centre d'Art Contemporain, Corbeil-Essonnes, France
- Pierre Restany/Gérard Xuriguera, "Le corps d'une mémoire", Herford, R.F.A, Drudk + Lithographie GmbH Éditeur, 1990
- Gérard Xuriguera, "Jiménez-Balaguer, œuvres des années 60", Genève, Claude Sabet Éditeur
- Catherine Francblin, Paris, France 1989
- Enté, alias Alexis Virginie Jimenez, "Réalité Autre", Paris, France 1987
- Claude Bouyeure, "Jiménez-Balaguer : Ligne après ligne", Magazine d’Art Cimaise, n° 176, France 1985
- Gérard Xuriguera, "La substance première", Paris, France
- Alain Macaire, Canal, n°1
- Ben Milard, París, Les Cahiers de la peinture, n° 181
- Claude Dorval, "Les peintures de Jiménez-Balaguer", Paris, Profils, 1984
- Yak Rivais, Paris, Les Cahiers de la peinture, n° 119
- Alain Macaire, "Une mémoire cosmique", Canal, n° 39
- Michel Arsene-Henry, Paris, Art Press, n° 48, 1981
- Claude Dorval, Paris, France
- Donatella Micault, "Un peintre, une œuvre : Jiménez-Balaguer", La Presse Française, 1980
- Claude Dorval, Art Press, n° 38
- Paule Gauthier, "Jiménez-Balaguer – Vers Un méta-matérialisme", Magazine d’Art Cimaise, n° 143, France, 1979
- Adam Saulnier, Paris
- G. Gassiot-Talabot, Magazine d’Art Cimaise, n° 53, 1961
- Stephen Spender, London
- Jasia Reicharat, Apollo, Modern Art in London, London
- M.F. Prieto, "Jiménez-Balaguer : l'art comme mystique"
- Robert Vrinat, Paris 1960
- Jamil Hamoudi, "Jiménez-Balaguer", Paris, Collection Arts et Lettres, Éditions Ishtar
- Maurice Gieure, Paris
- Jean Sylvain, Paris 1959
- Jean-Albert Cartier, Paris
- Denys Chevalier, Paris, Aujourd'hui, n° 26
- Alberto del Castillo, Diario de Barcelona, mars 1957
- Jorge del Castillo, Barcelona, Revista Fotogramas, n° 430
- Joan Fuster, "Peintura de Jiménez-Balaguer", Valencia
- José Maria de Martin, "La Jirafa", abril 1957
- Àngel Marsà, Correo catalán, febrero 1957
- Rafael Manzano, "La peinture pathétique de Jiménez-Balaguer" La Revista, n° 254, 1956
- Manuel Sánchez-Camargo, Palma de Mallorca, 1956
- Cesáreo Rodríguez-Aguilera, La Jirafa, Barcelona, Madrid 1956
- José de Castro Arines, "La pintura de Jiménez-Balaguer", Informaciones, Madrid 1956
- Juan Eduardo Cirlot, "Jiménez-Balaguer", monografía, Barcelona 1956
- Manuel Sánchez-Camargo, Revista, 1956, Manuel ARCE, "La peinture de Jiménez Balaguer", Alerta, Santander 1955
- Sebastià Gasch/Josep Maria de Sucre i de Grau, Barcelona
- Cesáreo Rodríguez-Aguilera, " Message du peintre ", Revista, febrero-marzo 1955
- Cesáreo Rodríguez-Aguilera, " Création et Communication" Santander 1955
- Español Vinas, "Jiménez-Balaguer et sa peinture", Barcelona, Imagenez y el Arte
- Sebastià Gasch, "Avec Jiménez-Balaguer", Destino, Barcelona 1954
- Àngel Marsà, "Quinze minutes devant les tableaux de Jiménez-Balaguer"
