= Antoni Vila Casas =

Spanish businessperson (1930–2023)

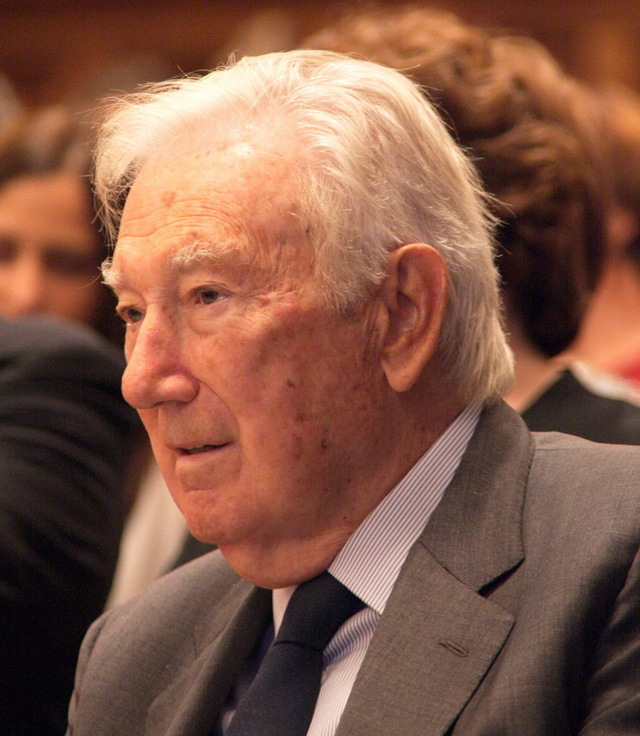
- Antoni Vila i Casas durant el lliurament de la medalla d'Or de l'Ajuntament de Barcelona a Neus Català
- Born: 27 November 1930; Barcelona
- Died: 14 September 2023 (aged 92); Barcelona
- Alma mater: University of Barcelona
- Occupation: Businessperson, patron of the arts
- Awards: Creu de Sant Jordi (1999); Grand Cross of the Order of Civil Merit (1997); Gold Medal of the Generalitat of Catalonia (2022); Medalla d'Or de l'Ajuntament de Barcelona (2013)

Antoni Vila Casas (27 November 1930 – 14 September 2023) was a Spanish pharmaceutical executive and philanthropist.

== Biography ==
Casas studied Batchillerato in Jesuites school in 1948. Later, he studied pharmacy and was graduated in 1956 by Universitat de Barcelona. In 1960, he founded Laboratorios Prodes S.A, and was the president of the board of directors.

During the following years, Casas acquired some laboratories until creating Prodesfarma Holding in 1986. At the same time, he founded Fundació Vila Casas, being the president, and promoting Catalan art and giving awards with the objective of helping health and art initiatives.

In 1995, he acquired Aquilea Laboratories. In 1997, he sold Prodesfarma to Grupo Almirall.

Casas died on 14 September 2023, at the age of 92.

== Awards received ==
- 1996 – Grand Cross of the Civil Honor
- 1999 – Creu de Sant Jordi Award
- 2004 – Premio Montblanc al mecenazgo
- 2012 – Gold Medal of the Cultural Merit de l'Ajuntament de Barcelona.
