= Antoni Taulé =

Spanish painter, architect, and performer (born 1945)

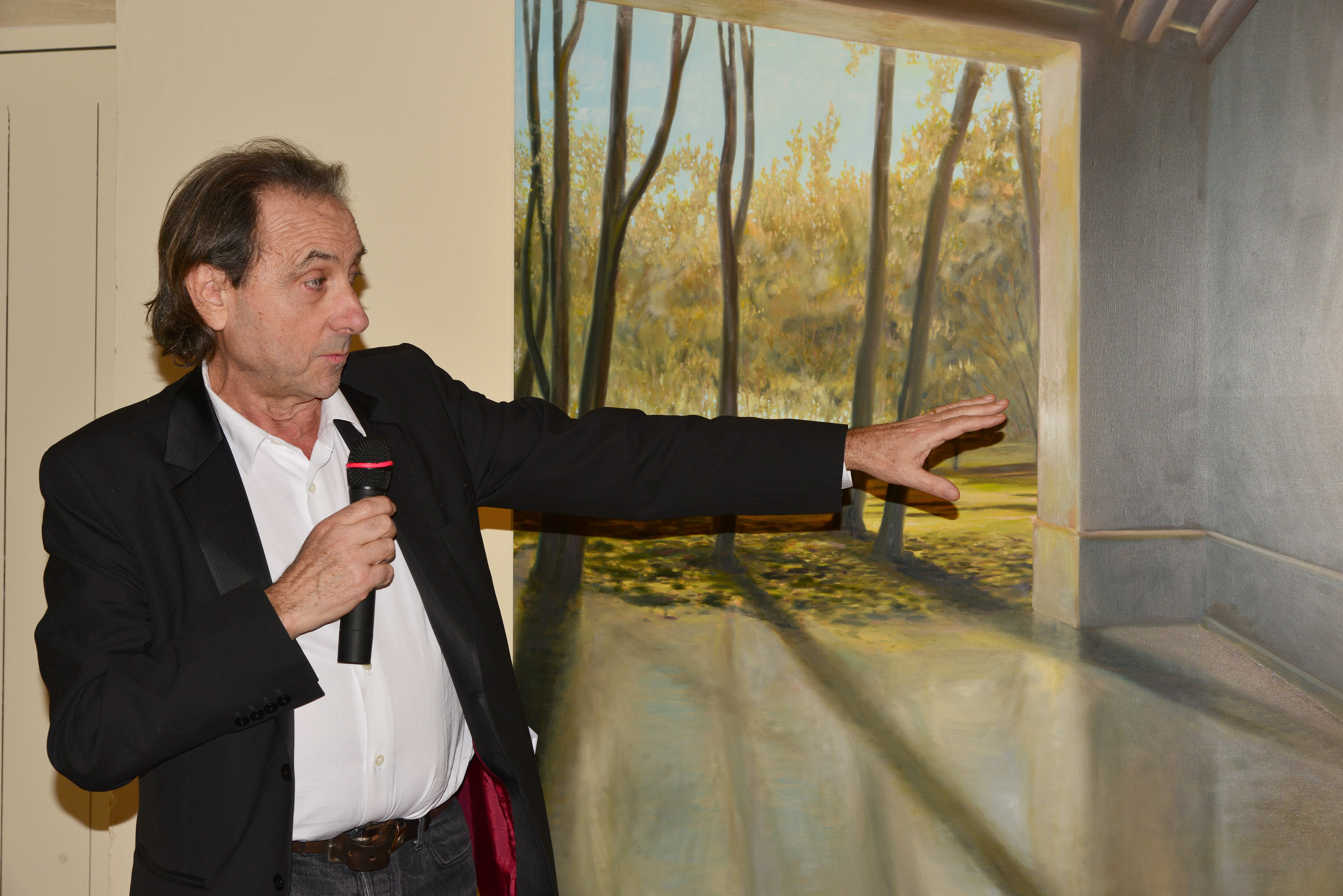
- Antoni Taulé in 2014.
- Born: August 25, 1945; Sabadell, Catalonia
- Education: Escola Tècnica Superior d'Arquitectura de Barcelona (ETSAB)
- Known for: painting, engraving, photography
- Notable work: Marquis de Sade, Alignement VI, scenography of ballet Washington Square by Henry James, Rudolf Nureyev
- Movement: hyperealism
- Awards: Chevalier des Arts et des Lettres
- Patrons: Joan Brossa
- Website: www.antonitaule.com

Antoni Taulé (born 1945) is a Spanish painter, architect, and performer. A street artist during the sixties, his art has been labelled as part of hyperrealism and a representative of the “new figurative” movement. He paints classical empty buildings and interiors: ballrooms, office receptions, halls of the Louvre museum, chambers of the Prado, the Palace of Versailles, monumental spaces that fuse reality and fiction under a fleeting atmosphere of light.

The building is actually just like a person. It has a heart, lungs, a nervous system, intestines, and eyes ... I am fascinated with what one can see, with the reason why does one look at it or avoid looking, and how one reflects upon what he sees. In one word my work is about how a man functions.

His unique creative universe mixes scientific and mathematical concepts and a passion for art from the past, Italian, Dutch and Spanish old masters, especially Diego Velázquez and Francisco Goya. It has inspired numbers of writers and critics, like Jean-Christophe Bailly or Julio Cortázar who, fascinated by Taulé's rooms and tables, wrote the story “Fin de etapa”, in Deshoras, a book published in 1983. From 1982 onwards, Antoni Taulé has created set designs, largely springing from development in his own painting, for some of the great opera and theatre, including Washington Square, Henry James's novel, adapted by Rudolf Nureyev, Enfance and Pour un oui, pour un non (For No Good Reason) by Nathalie Sarraute, or Francis Poulenc and his Dialogues of the Carmelites adapted from a play by Georges Bernanos.

== Collections ==
- Acadèmia de belles-arts, Sabadell, Spain.
- Ajuntament de Formentera, Spain.
- Banco Sabadell, Spain.
- Barcelona Museum of Contemporary Art, Barcelona
- Bibliothèque nationale de Luxembourg.
- Caixa d’Estalvis de Sabadell, Spain.
- Centre national des arts plastiques (CNAP), France.
- Fonds national d’art contemporain (FNAC), France.
- Fundació Stämpfli, Sitges, Barcelona.
- Fundació Vila Casas, Barcelona.
- La Caixa Foundation, Barcelona.
- Generalitat de Catalunya, Barcelona.
- Palladium Group.
- Hastings Foundation, New York.
- Mairie de Montrouge, France.
- Mairie de Villeurbanne, France.
- Maison de la culture du Havre, France.
- Maison de la culture de Grenoble, France.
- Météo France.
- Musée d’art moderne de la Ville de Paris.
- Musée de Besançon, France.
- Musée de Pau, France.
- Museu art 2000, Torroella de Montgri, Spain.
- Museu d’art modern, Barcelona.
- Museu de la Diputacio, Barcelona.
- Radio France internationale (RFI).
- Tour d’Argent, Tokyo.
- Villa Tamaris centre d’art, La Seyne-sur-mer, France.

== Selected solo exhibitions ==
- 2012 Besharat Gallery, Atlanta, United States.
- 2010 Fudació Vila Casas, Can Framis, Barcelona.
- 2006 Villa Tamaris centre d’art, La Seyne-sur-mer, rétrospective (1966–2006).
- 2006 Galerie Noordeinde, The Hague, Netherlands.
- 2005 Shanghai Art Fair, China.
- 2002 Àmbit galeria d’art, Barcelona.
- 2002 Galerie Ollier, Fribourg, Switzerland.
- 1998 Galerie Kiron, Dallas-Fortworth, United States.
- 1996 Alliance française, Casa Taulé, Sabadell, Spain.
- 1995 Galerie Lucien Schweitzer, Luxembourg.
- 1995 Oda, Sala d’art, Barcelona.
- 1994 Galeria AB, Granollers, Spain.
- 1993 Galerie Kiron, Paris.
- 1992 Sala Gaspar, Barcelona.
- 1990 Galeria Lola Cerdan, Barcelona.
- 1989 Galeria Susany, Vic, Spain.
- 1989 Galerie du Centre, Paris.
- 1988 Institut d'estudis Ilerdencs, Lleida, Spain.
- 1987 Goya Museum, Castres, France.
- 1986 Museum of Kitakyushu, Japan.
- 1986 Museum of Fukuoka, Japan.
- 1985 ABC Gallery, Osaka.
- 1985 Takagi Gallery, Nagoya.
- 1985 Institut franco-japonais, Tokyo.
- 1983 Hastings Gallery, New York.
- 1979 Salo del Tinell, Barcelona.
- 1977 Galerie Beaubourg, Paris.
- 1976 Galerie Fabien Boulakia, Paris.
- 1976 Galerie Maeght, Barcelona.
- 1975 Galerie Mathias Fels, Paris.
- 1973 Sala Gaudi, Barcelona.
- 1967 Palau Maricel, Sitges, Spain.
- 1966 Acadèmia de belles-arts, Sabadell, Spain.

== Selected group exhibitions ==
- 2006 Holland art fair (HAF), Galerie Noordeinde, Pays-Bas.
- 2004 Seoul museum of contemporary art, Seoul, South-Korea.
- 1999 Homenaje a Joan Brossa, Diputacion provincial de Huelva, Spain.
- 1996 Le Noir est une couleur, Galerie Maeght, Barcelona.
- 1994 Hommage à Julio Cortázar, Centre culturel du Mexique, Paris.
- 1991 Jornades d’art cotemporani, Camprodon, Spain.
- 1988 Exposition itinérante en Catalogne, Del vell al nou.
- 1987 Unesco, 40 ans, 40 pays, 40 artistes, Paris.
- 1983 Photogénies, Palais de Tokyo, Paris.
- 1983 Figurations révolutionnaires, de Cézanne à aujourd’hui, Bridgestone Museum of Art, Tokyo.
- 1983 Nouvelles figurations en France, Galerie Seoul, South-Korean.
- 1982 Tendances de la peinture contemporaine, Besançon et Belfort, France.
- 1979 Tendances de l’art en France, II, Musée d’art moderne la Ville de Paris, France.
- 1977 Exposition itinérante La Peinture espagnole contemporaine, Tuzla, Brcko, Doloj and Belgrad.
- 1976 Jeune peinture, Musée d’art moderne de la Ville de Paris, France.
- 1967 XXe Salo de maig, Barcelona.
- 1966 Museu d’art modern, Barcelona.

== Selected bibliography ==
- Collectif; Cortázar, Julio; Pradel, Jean-Louis; Bonaccorsi, Robert (2006). La pintura de Taulé, peintures 1966–2006 (in French). La Seyne-sur-Mer, France, Toulon Provence Méditerranée, communauté d'agglomération. ISBN 2-91571-809-1.
- Sala Sanahuja, Joaquim (2005). Taulé-filiacions, Josep Maria Taulé i Coll, Antoni Taulé i Pujol, Tigrane Tanguy Théodore Taulé Ney (in French and Catalan). imprimerie Snoeck-Ducaju & Zoon.
- Lætitia Ney d’Elchingen, Læticia (1998). Nox (in French). Galerie Kiron.
- De Smedt, Marc; Cortázar, Julio; Jouffroy, Alain; Brossa, Joan; Bailly, Jean-Christophe; Král, Petr; Sautreau, Serge; Raillard, Georges; Balsach Peig, Maria Joseph; Domecq, Jean-Philippe; Baatsch, Henri-Alexis; David, Catherine; Fournier, Michel; Sala-Sanahuja, Joaquim; Giralt Miracle, Daniel; Gassiot-Talabot, Gérald (1981). Laboratoire de lumière (in French). Cesare Rancilio Editeur.

== T.V. Interviews and Reports ==
- La magie du silence, Fundacio Vila Casas, interview and report, Arte, 2010 (French or German)
- Taulé draws from architecture, interview and report, France 24, 2008 (English version)
- Antoni Taulé, peintre inclassable, interview and report, France 24, 2008 (French version)
