= Palau Solterra =

Coordinates: 42.0417°N 3.1261°E

The Palau Solterra houses the Contemporary Photography Museum of the Fundació Vila Casas (national and international) located in the town of Torroella de Montgrí in the Baix Empordà region of Catalonia. It was opened in 2000.

The collection comprises some 300 contemporary photographs with works by artists from around the world, including Chema Madoz, Alberto García Álix, Toni Catany and Otto Lloyd. In addition to the centre's permanent collection, temporary exhibitions and a cycle of conferences on history and humanities are held annually.

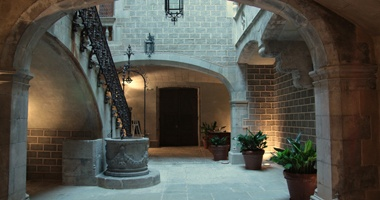
Museo Palau Solterra

Related with the building, the Palau Solterra is a 15th-century palatial mansion that was once the residence of the Counts of Torroella de Montgrí.
