= Fundació Vila Casas =

Coordinates: 41.3910°N 2.1762°E

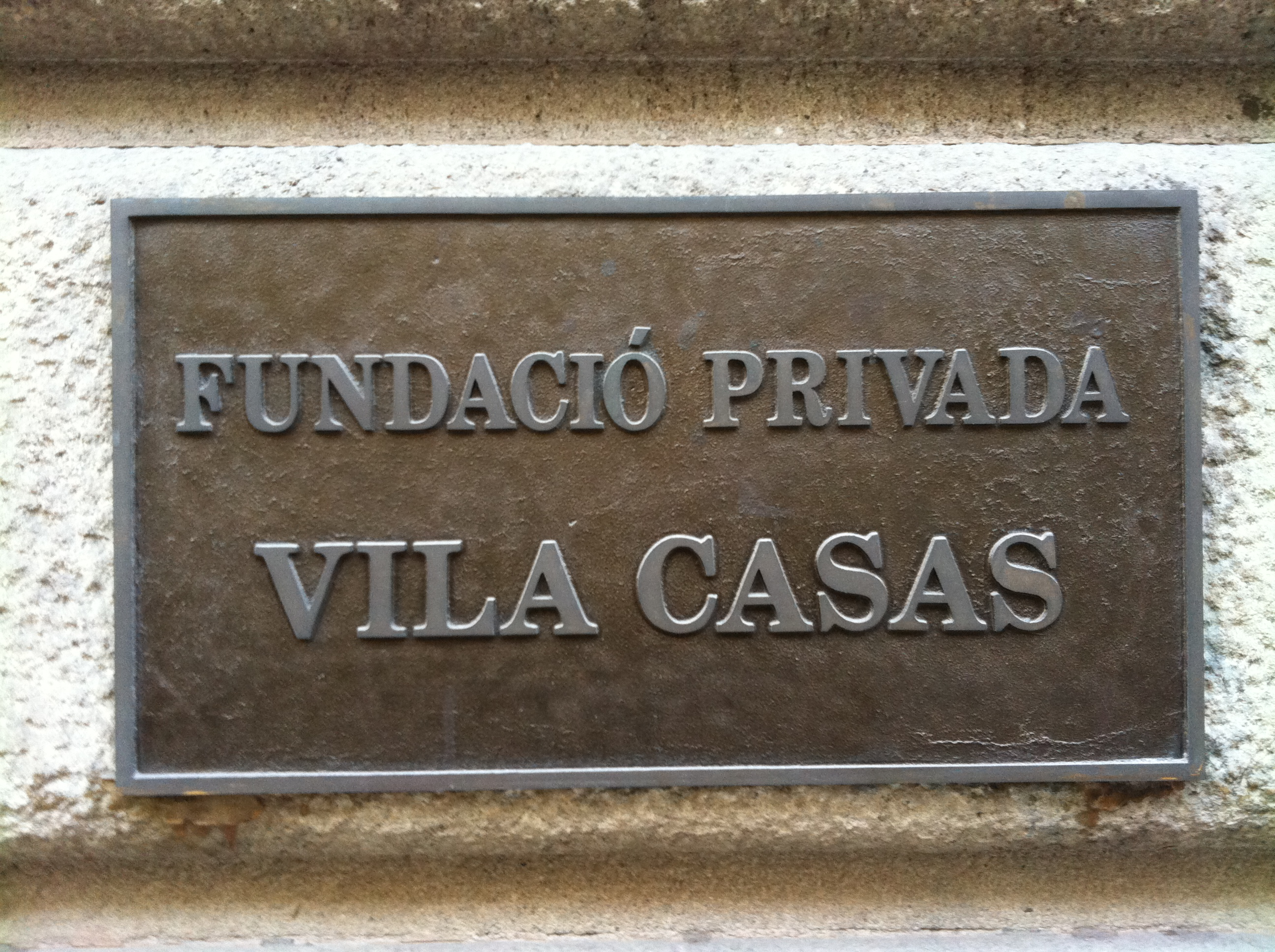
This nameplate can be found at the entrance of the headquarters of the Foundation.

The Fundació Vila Casas, founded in 1986 by the pharmaceutical entrepreneur Antoni Vila Casas, is a private, non-profit organisation which has the promotion of contemporary Catalan art as its main aim.

With five exhibition centers, all part of the Catalan architectural heritage, the foundation has become a platform for exhibiting a permanent collection and holding temporary shows of the artists featured in the collection. The aims of the Fundació Vila Casas in the field of arts is the promotion of the work and the artistic careers of Catalan artists, meaning artists who live or work in Catalonia, by means of:

- Exhibitions
- Conferences
- Donations
- The awarding of prizes.
- The promotion of collectors.
- The providing of museums and galleries for the exhibition of work by contemporary Catalan artists.

Since 1998 the headquarters of the Fundació Vila Casas have been located on the first floor of the Modernist building Casa Felip, at Ausiàs Marc Street, number 20, Barcelona. Originally it was the residence of the Felip family, who commissioned the architect Telm Fernández to build it in 1901. Years later it was designated a site of local cultural heritage by the Barcelona city council. The first floor housing the headquarters of the Fundació Vila Casas is not open to the public, but it can be visited with the purchase of the catalogue of the Fundació Vila Casas.

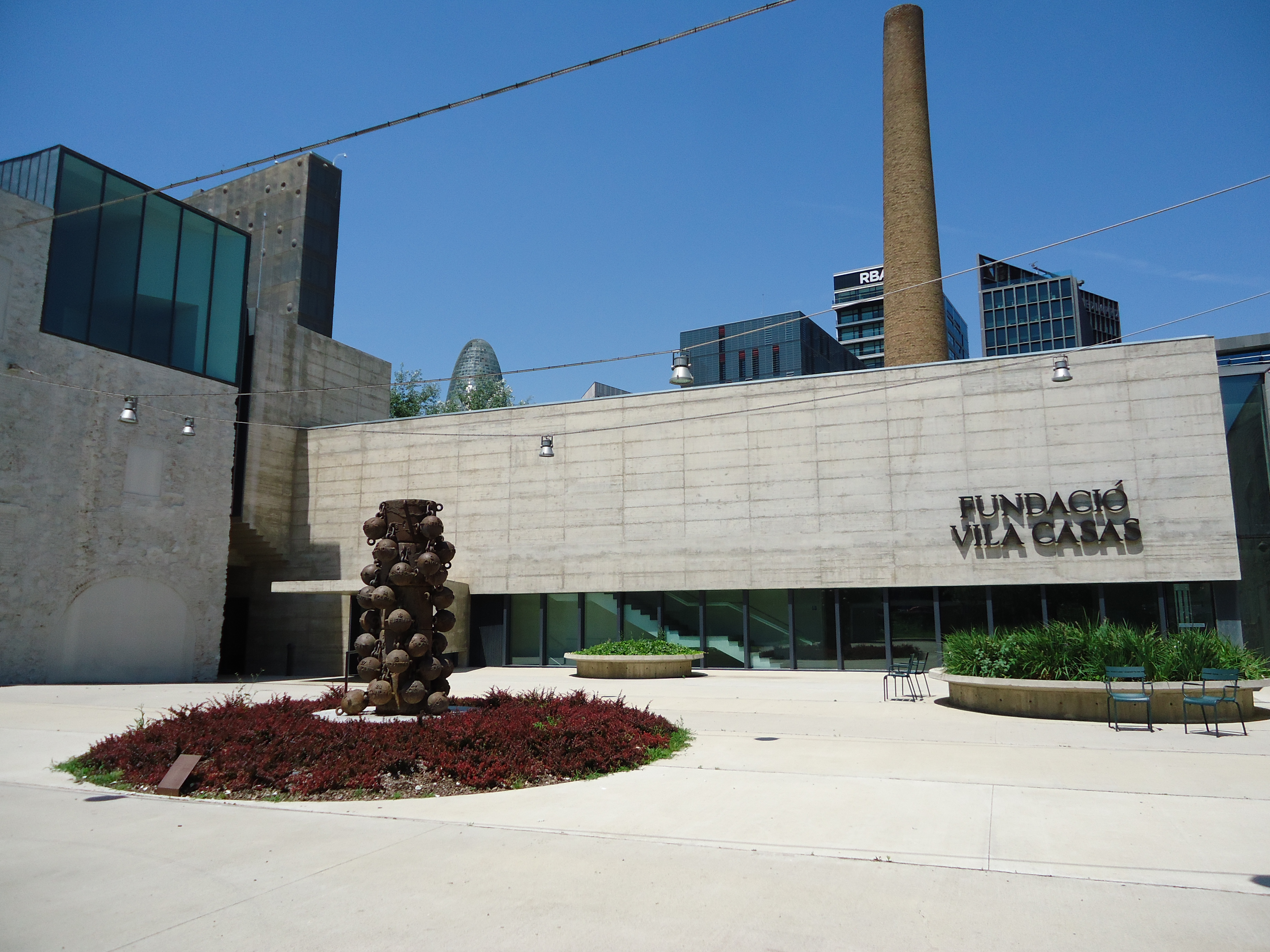
Can Framis Museum (Barcelona). Permanent collection of contemporary Catalan painting.

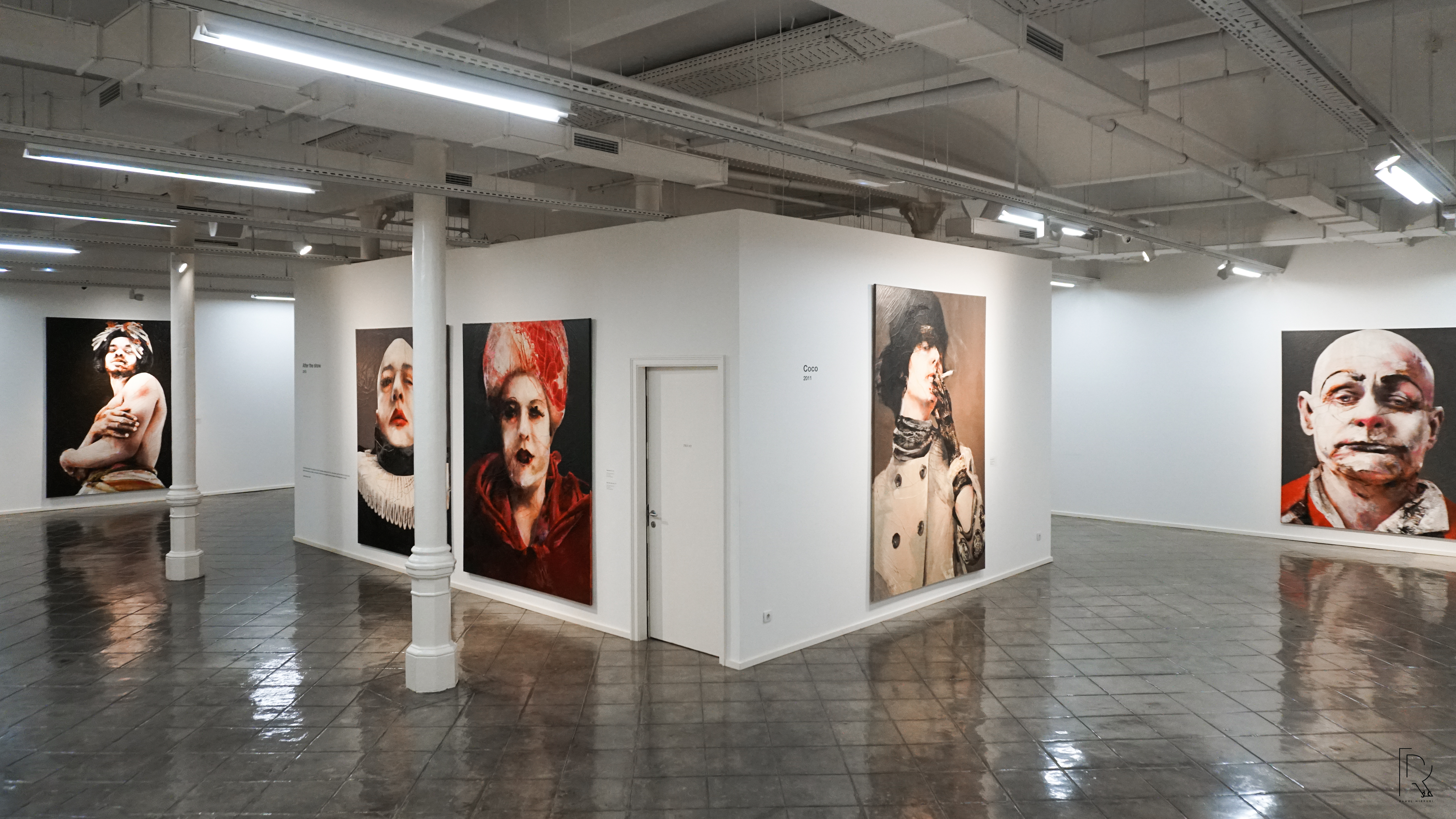
Espai Volart, one of the two art spaces that Fundació Vila Casas has in Barcelona.

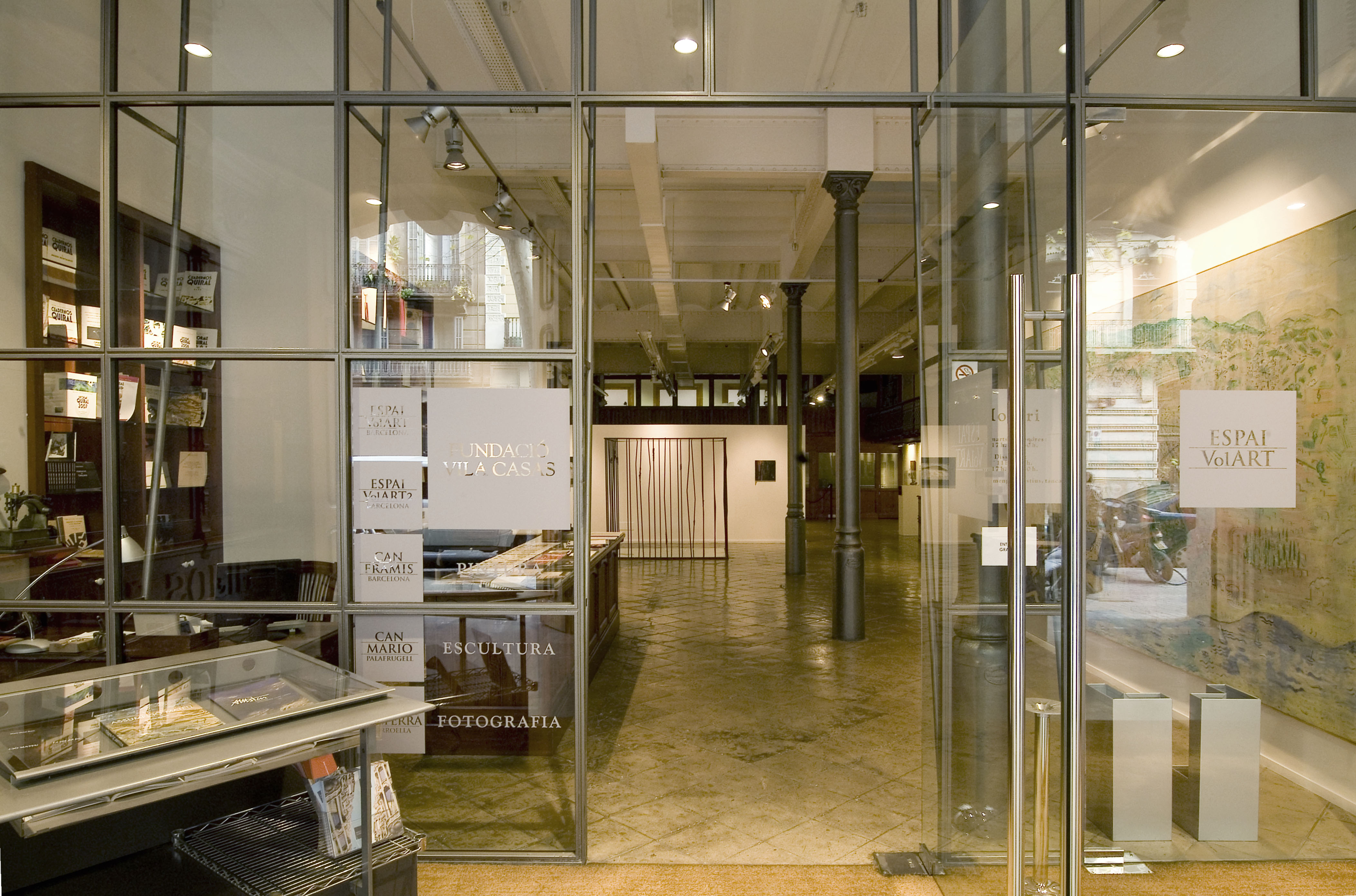
Espai Volart 2, one of the two art spaces that Fundació Vila Casas has in Barcelona.

== Fundació Vila Casas Museums and art spaces ==
The Fundació Vila Casas has three museums divided by artistic disciplines: Can Framis (painting), Can Framis (sculpture) and Palau Solterra (photography), with two art spaces in Barcelona for temporary exhibitions.

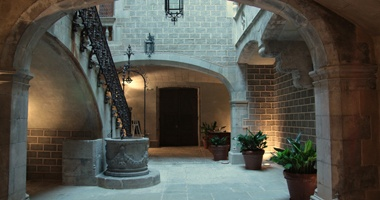
Palau Solterra (Torroella de Montgrí). Museum of Contemporary Photography (National and International)

Can Framis Museum is the latest Fundació Vila Casas museum, an art center devoted to the promotion of contemporary Catalan painting. Located in the old Can Framis factory complex, the museum displays more than 250 paintings from the sixties up to the present made by artists born or currently living in Catalonia. In addition to the permanent collection which is divided in three floors, Can Framis Museum also has an area dedicated to temporary exhibitions named Espai Aø. They update their permanent collection periodically and open two new temporary exhibitions every three months.

Espai Volart is a space for temporary exhibitions of artists featured in the collection. In 2002 it was the foundation's first art space to open its doors to the public in Barcelona. It is located in the old storerooms of the Modernist building Casa Antonia Puget, on Ausiàs Marc 22, and was declared a site of local cultural heritage by the Barcelona city council. It was built in 1904 by the architects Roc Cot i Cot and Ramon Viñolas. Every July the Patrim exhibitions, shows of work by students in Fine Arts at Barcelona University, are also held at Espai Volart, as well as an exhibition of a selection of works from the Ynglada-Guillot drawing prize and the award ceremony.

The building was built in 1904 by the architects Roc Cot i Cot and Ramon Viñolas. At the end of the 19th century the site of the present Espai Volart was the business premises of Volart de puntes i teixits and was used to store cloth and lacework, typical products of the Catalan textile industry of the time.

Every July the Patrim exhibition of work by students finishing Fine Arts at the University of Barcelona are held at Espai Volart, as well as an exhibition of a selection of works from the Ynglada-Guillot drawing prize and the award ceremony. at Carrer Ausiàs Marc 20, Barcelona. It was constructed in 1901 by the architect Telm Fernández. At the beginning of the 1980s it was declared a site of local cultural heritage by the Barcelona city council.

Espai Volart 2. A space that holds temporary exhibitions by well-known artists whose work falls into one of the three disciplines of the collection: contemporary painting, photography or sculpture. Unlike Espai Volart, which concentrates exclusively on artists from the collection, Espai Volart 2 presents the work of artists well known in the Catalan art world. Espai Volart 2 was opened in 2008 and is located in the old storerooms of the Modernista building Casa Felip, at Ausiàs Marc 20, Barcelona. It was constructed in 1901 by the architect Telm Fernández. At the beginning of the 1980s it was declared a site of local cultural heritage by the Barcelona city council.

Can Mario Museum. Can Mario is the Fundació Vila Casas Museum of Contemporary Sculpture in Palafrugell (Costa Brava). It was opened in 2004. It has around 220 works on show dating from the 1960s to the present day by a wide range of artists born or living in Catalonia. Temporary exhibitions are also held every year. Can Mario was a cork factory dating from the early 20th century and was one of the buildings of the Miquel, Vincke and Meyer cork company. Since April 2011, 33 sculptures by artists from the Empordà region of Catalonia have been placed in the Gardens of Can Mario as permanent open air exhibits. In October of the same year the Empordà Room was opened in the Museum, for holding temporary exhibitions of artists from the region.

Palau Solterra Museum, Torroella de Montgrí. Palau Solterra is the Fundació Vila Casas Museum of Contemporary Photography (national and international) located in the town of Torroella de Montgrí in the Empordà region of Catalonia. It was opened in 2000. There are presently approximately 200 contemporary photographs on display by artists from around the world. Palau Solterra is a 15th-century palace that was the ancestral home of the Counts of Torroella de Montgrí. As well as the permanent collection, temporary exhibitions and a cycle of conferences on history and humanities are held annually.

== Fundació Vila Casas Awards ==
- ACCA The Art of Collecting at the Fundació Vila Casas. ACCA de la Crítica d’Art First Prize for the best initiative. 27th edition
- Fundació Vila Casas. Winner of the National Award for Cultural Heritage

== Fundació Vila Casas Prizes ==
The Fundació Vila Casas holds an annual open prize competition for artists. The competition is held in a different discipline - painting, photography or sculpture - each year.
