= Toni Catany =

Catalan photographer (1942–2013)

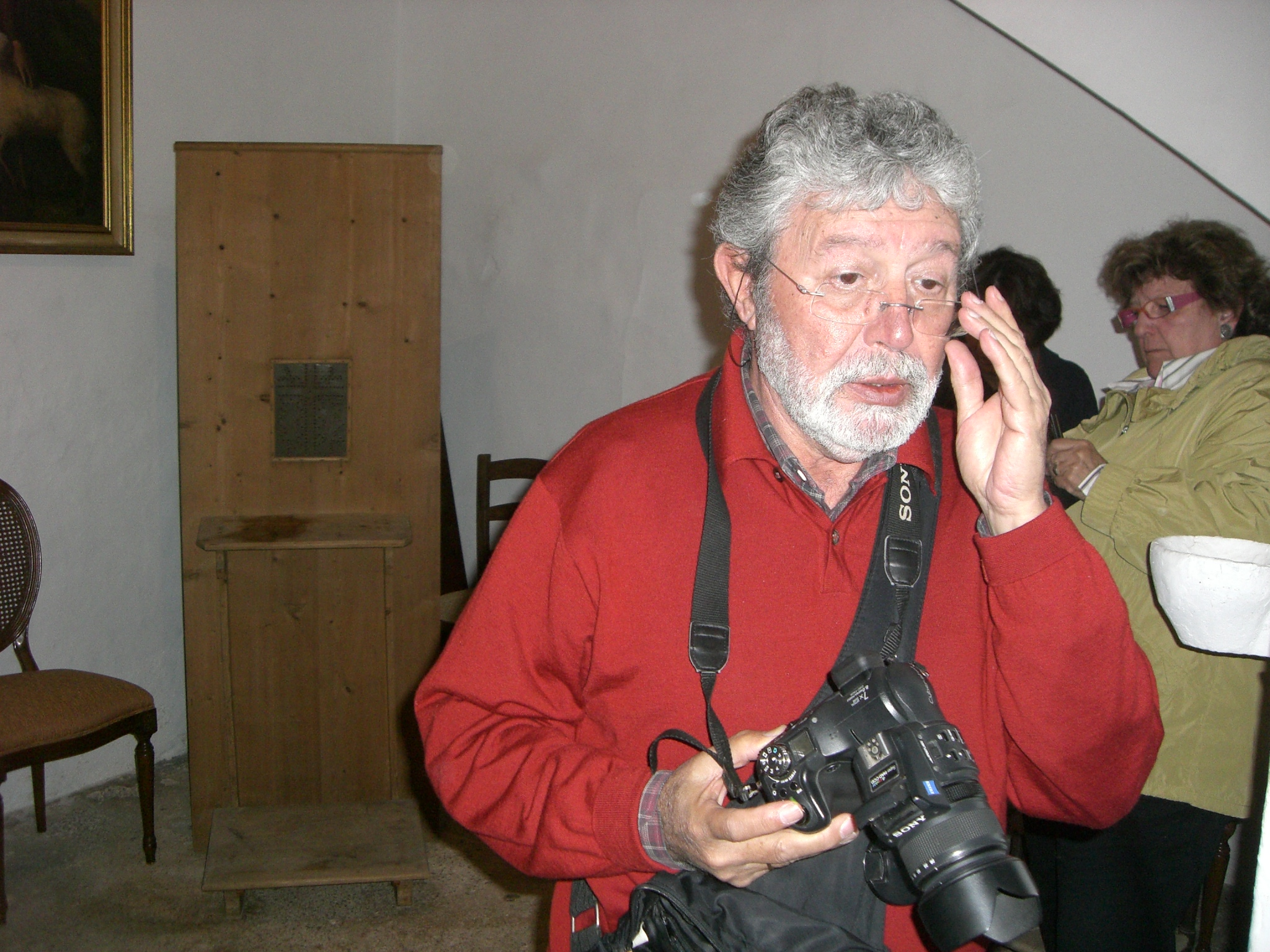
- Born: 1942; Llucmajor
- Died: 2013 (aged 70–71)
- Known for: photography

Toni Catany (1942-2013) was a Catalan photographer. Catany was born in Llucmajor.

His work is included in collections of the Museum of Fine Arts Houston, the Museo Reina Sofia, Madrid, and the Museu Nacional d'Art de Catalunya.

== Biography ==
Self-taught, he arrived in Barcelona in 1960 to begin his studies in chemical sciences. There he began his career as a photographer doing travel reports. However, from the very beginning, he opted for themes far removed from photojournalism, and in 1972 he held his first exhibition.

In 2023 the Centre Internacional de Fotografia Toni Catany was inaugurated in his hometown.
