= Can Mario Museum =

Museum in Catalonia, Spain

Coordinates: 41°55′08″N 3°09′58″E

Can Mario Museum is the Fundació Vila Casas Museum of Contemporary Sculpture in Palafrugell (Costa Brava). It was opened in 2004. It has around 220 works on show dating from the 1960s to the present day by a wide range of artists born or living in Catalonia. Temporary exhibitions are also held every year.

Temporary exhibitions are organised every year. Can Mario was a cork factory dating from the early 20th century and was one of the buildings of the Miquel & Vincke cork company. Today it is a place for contemplating art situated in the Plaça de Can Mario, where we can also find a modernista water tower and the Cork Museum.

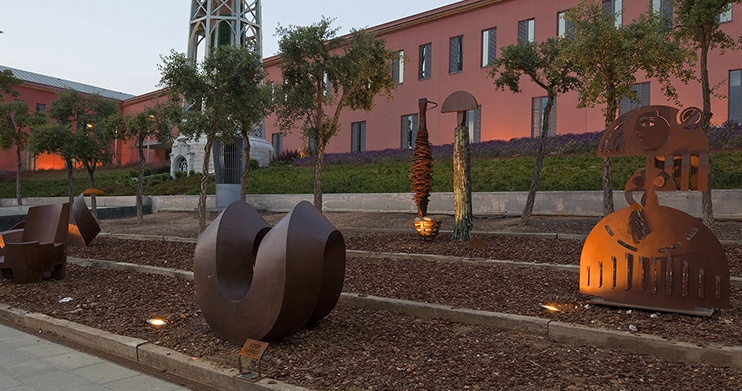
Museo Can Mario

Since April 2011, 33 sculptures by artists from the Empordà region of Catalonia have been placed in the Gardens of Can Mario, as permanent, open air exhibits. In October of the same year the Empordà Gallery was opened in the Museum, for holding temporary exhibitions of artists from the region.
