= Catalan art =

Art in Catalonia

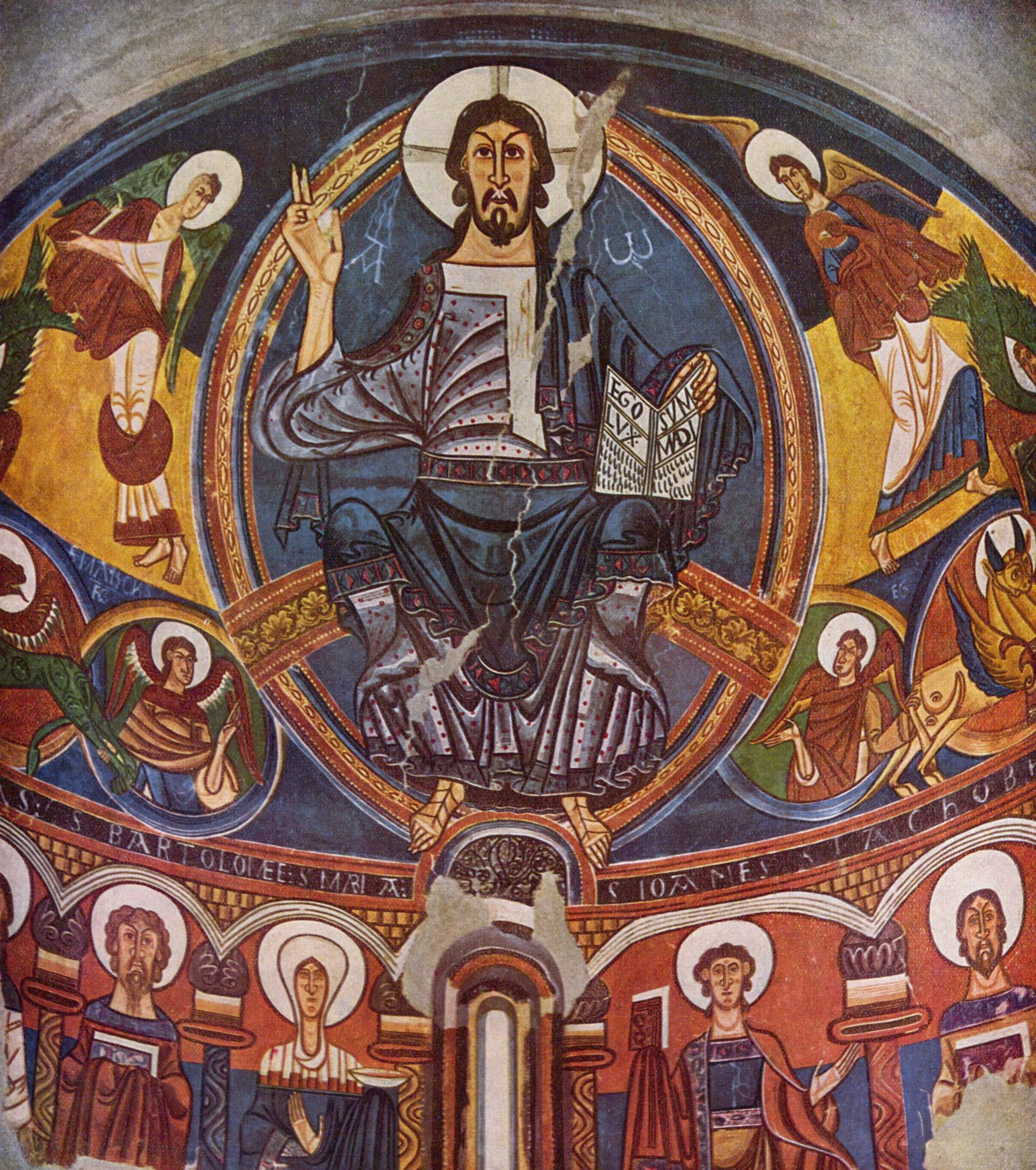
Pantocrator of Sant Climent de Taüll, MNAC

The Catalan art is the artistic production made in what is now Catalonia along the time. It has a parallel evolution to the rest of European art, following in a diverse way the multiple tendencies that have taken place in the context of the history of Western art. Throughout history, Catalonia has seen diverse cultures and civilizations that contributed their concept of art and have left their legacy. Each historical period has specific and definable characteristics, common to other lands and cultures, or unique and differentiated, which evolved over time.

== History ==
=== Ancient and Medieval ===
Catalan art is the result of the diverse social and cultural amalgam brought about by the diverse peoples that inhabited its territory: the first prehistoric settlers were succeeded by various peoples, such as Iberians who arrived during the Bronze and Iron Ages; these later convisquered with the first colonizers from the Mediterranean civilizations, the Greeks; then the Romans arrived, who disseminated their art and architecture throughout the territory. After its fall, Catalonia was part of the Visigothic kingdom, and later it received the Islamic occupation, which architecture is today visible in places of the half south of the territory. The Middle Ages will be the beginning of Catalan culture as a defined entity, with its own language, descent of Latin, and the formation of the Principality of Catalonia. It was a time of splendor for Catalan art, and the Romanesque and the Gothic will be very fruitful periods for the artistic development of the Principality.

=== Early Modern ===
During the early modern age, with Spain taking control of Catalonia and the succession of various economic crises, Catalan art declined, and Renaissance and Baroque styles were not particularly noteworthy in the history of Catalan art. Nevertheless, there were some centres of artistic importance such as the Carthusian monastery of Scala Dei which employed both talented monks as well as lay friars such as friar Lluís Pascal, friar Ramón Berenguer and Joaquim Juncosa. The later became one of the most famous painters of Catalan Baroque. Juncosa painted several portraits and frescoes at the monastery, unfortunately all of them were lost in the following events.

Since the nineteenth century, with the economic and cultural revitalization, the art flourished again; and Modernisme (related to European Art Nouveau) became one of the most splendid periods of Catalan art, given to the world many important figures such as Antoni Gaudí, Lluís Domènech i Muntaner or Ramon Casas, among others. The twentieth century brought the updating of the different styles produced by Catalan artists, which connect with international trends, offering even leading figures worldwide such as Salvador Dalí, Joan Miró, Antoni Tàpies, Albert Ràfols-Casamada, Joaquim Chancho and Yago Hortal.

== See also ==
- Francisco Sans Castaño

== Bibliography ==
- AA.VV. Història de l'art català. Edicions 62 (Barcelona, 2005) ISBN 84-297-1997-0
- Alonso Tejada, Anna and Grimal Navarro, Alexandre. L'Art Rupestre del Cogul. Primeres imatges humanes a Catalunya. Pagès Editors (Lleida, 2007) ISBN 978-84-9779-593-7
- DD., AA. (1998). Art de Catalunya. Edicions L'isard. ISBN 84-921314-5-4.
