= List of museums and collections of the Baix Empordà region =

The following list of Museums and Collections of the Baix Empordà region is related with the different museums and collections that exist in the Baix Empordà region.

== Museums and collections ==
Museum	Location	Year of foundation	Typology	Network	Coordinates	Photo
The Gala Dalí Castle House-Museum	Púbol (La Pera)	1996	Art		42° 00′ 53″ N, 2° 59′ 00″ E	
The Archaeological Museum of Catalonia-Ullastret	Ullastret		Archaeology	Territorial network of museums in the counties of Girona	42° 0′ 21.1″ N, 3° 4′ 47.5″ E	
The Museum of the Mediterranean	Torroella de Montgrí	1982	Ethnology Archaeology	Museums of the Costa Brava Network of Museums of Ethnology of Catalonia Territorial network of museums in the counties of Girona Network of Maritime Museums of the Catalan Coast Association of Maritime Museums of the Mediterranean	42° 2′ 28.28″ N, 3° 7′ 27.85″ E	
The Fishing Museum	Palamós	2002	Ethnology	Museums of the Costa Brava Network of Museums of Ethnology of Catalonia Network of Maritime Museums of the Catalan Coast Territorial network of museums in the counties of Girona International Council of Museums International Council of Maritime Museums Association of Maritime Museums of the Mediterranean	41° 50′ 42″ N, 3° 7′ 36″ E	
The Cork Museum	Palafrugell	1972	Science and technology	Museums of the Costa Brava Territorial network of museums in the counties of Girona	41° 55′ 7″ N, 3° 9′ 54″ E	
The Terracotta Ceramics Museum	La Bisbal d'Empordà	1991	Science and technology	Museums of the Costa Brava Territorial network of museums in the counties of Girona	41° 57′ 36″ N, 3° 02′ 26″ E	
The Sant Feliu de Guíxols History Museum	Sant Feliu de Guíxols	1919	History	Museums of the Costa Brava Network of Maritime Museums of the Catalan Coast Territorial network of museums in the counties of Girona Association of Maritime Museums of the Mediterranean	41° 46′ 38″ N, 3° 1′ 25″ E	
The Maritime Rescue Museum	Sant Feliu de Guíxols		Science and technology	Museums of the Costa Brava Network of Museums of Ethnology of Catalonia Network of Maritime Museums of the Catalan Coast Territorial network of museums in the counties of Girona Association of Maritime Museums of the Mediterranean	41° 46′ 48″ N, 3° 2′ 8″ E	
The Carmen Thyssen Space	Sant Feliu de Guíxols	2012	Art		41° 46′ 38″ N, 3° 1′ 25″ E	
The Josep Pla Foundation	Palafrugell	1990	Literature Biographical	Espais Escrits. Catalan literary heritage network.	41° 55′ 2″ N, 3° 9′ 38″ E	
The Cuixart Foundation	Palafrugell	1998	Art		41° 55′ 06″ N, 3° 10′ 01″ E	
The Mascort Foundation	Torroella de Montgrí	2007	Art Ethnology		42° 02′ 29.4″ N, 3° 07′ 33.4″ E	
Can Mario Museum - The Vila Casas Foundation	Palafrugell	2004	Art		41° 55′ 08″ N, 3° 9′ 58″ E	
Palau Solterra Museum - The Vila Casas Foundation	Torroella de Montgrí	2000	Photography		42° 2′ 30″ N, 3° 7′ 30″ E	
The House of Magic. The Xevi Collection	Santa Cristina d'Aro	2002	Magic		41° 48′ 53″ N, 3° 0′ 05.2″ E	
Ca la Pruna - Culture Museum	Pals	2015	Ethnology		41° 58′ 13.7″ N, 3° 8′ 40.6″ E	
The Jam Museum	Torrent	2004	Gastronomy		41° 57′ 07.84″ N, 3° 07′ 41.05″ E	
The Toy Museum	Sant Feliu de Guíxols	2000	Ethnology		41° 46′ 54.88″ N, 3° 1′ 45.12″ E	
The Doll Museum	Castell d'Aro	1997	Ethnology		41° 48′ 53.06″ N, 3° 1′ 51″ E	
The Rural Museum	Palau-sator	1996	Ethnology		41° 59′ 20.9″ N, 3° 06′ 34.3″ E	
The Enrique Sacristán Zarzuela Museum	Santa Cristina d'Aro		Art Biographical		41° 48′ 10.2″ N, 2° 59′ 15.7″ E	
The Gastronomy Interpretation Centre	Palafrugell		Gastronomy		41° 54′ 44.9″ N, 3° 09′ 07.6″ E	
The Sa Perola Interpretation Centre	Palafrugell	2010	Ethnology		41° 53′ 19.7″ N, 3° 11′ 04.8″ E	
The Historical Site of Sant Sebastià de la Guarda	Palafrugell		Archaeology		41° 53′ 50″ N, 3° 12′ 10″ E	
Nativity Dioramas in the Monastery of Solius	Solius (Santa Cristina d'Aro)	1970	Art Religious		41° 48′ 53.2″ N, 2° 57′ 44″ E	
