= Carmen Thyssen Space =

Art gallery in Sant Feliu de Guíxols, Catalonia, Spain

Coordinates: 41°46′48″N 3°01′34″E

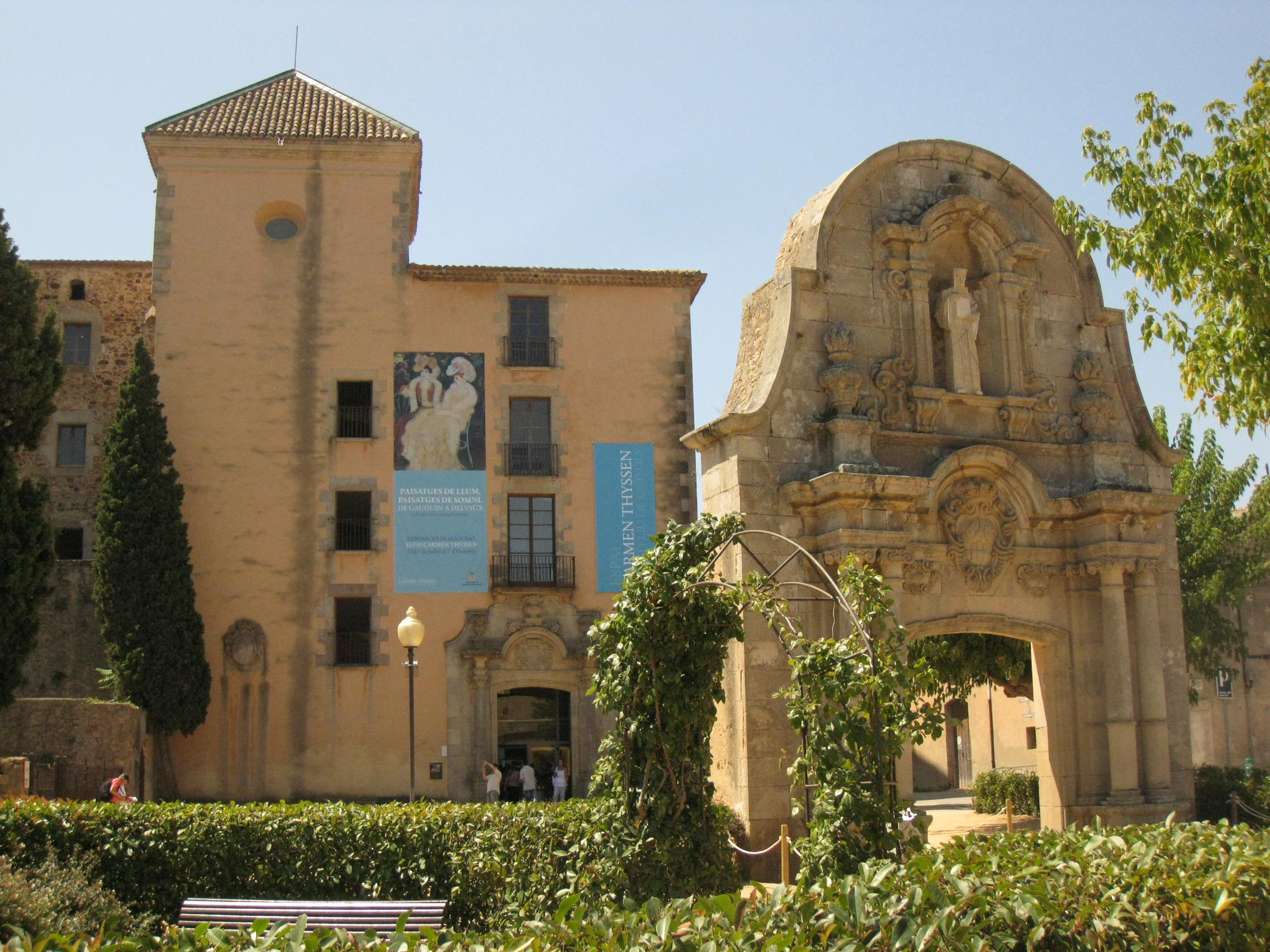
Carmen Thyssen Space

The Carmen Thyssen Space is an art gallery in the municipality of Sant Feliu de Guíxols, in the Baix Empordà region. containing works from the Carmen Thyssen Collection. Her commitment to promoting culture lends special relevance to the family activities that accompany the artwork on display.

The center is housed in the Palau de l'Abat (The Abbot's Palace), a former Benedictine monastery.

== History ==
In 2003 an agreement was signed between the mayor of Sant Feliu de Guíxols, the Minister of Culture of the Generalitat de Catalunya and baroness Carmen Cervera giving 350 works from the Thyssen collection of Catalan painting between 1850 and 1950 to the Carmen Thyssen Space, including works by painters such as Ramon Casas, Isidre Nonell and Santiago Rusinyol. Some of these works are currently exhibited at the National Art Museum of Catalonia and the other part comes from the Carmen Cervera private collection.

Firstly, the city council had to give away an old 17th century hospital, but it was finally decided that the location of the collection would be the Serra Vicens factory.

Due to the situation of economic crisis, the creation of this center was delayed. In 2012, finally, the center, called Espai Carmen Thyssen, was inaugurated at The Sant Feliu de Guíxols History Museum, occupying part of the baroque abbey palace of the monastery.

Currently, the project contemplates the extension, both of activities and of spaces, in the near future with the objective to complement its counterparts in Madrid with the Thyssen-Bornemisza Museum and in Málaga and Andorra with the Carmen Thyssen Museum. In this sense, the main intention is to extend the temporary exhibition up to eight months and to expand the Carmen Thyssen Space, which implies an important intervention in the monastery building.

== Exhibition ==
Since the first exhibition, the Carmen Thyssen Space has become one of the most important artistic centers of the Costa Brava.

The different temporary exhibitions presented were:

- Landscapes of light, landscapes of dreams. From Gauguin to Delvaux. (2012)
- Sisley-Kandinsky-Hopper. (2013)
- The ideal in the landscape. Among Meifrén, Matisse and Goncharova. (2014)
- Barcelona-Paris-New York. From Urgell to O'Keeffe. (2015)
- The Fantastic Far West. (2016)
- An ideal world, from Van Gogh to Gauguin and Vasarely. (2017)
