= Santa Cristina d'Aro =

- Municipality
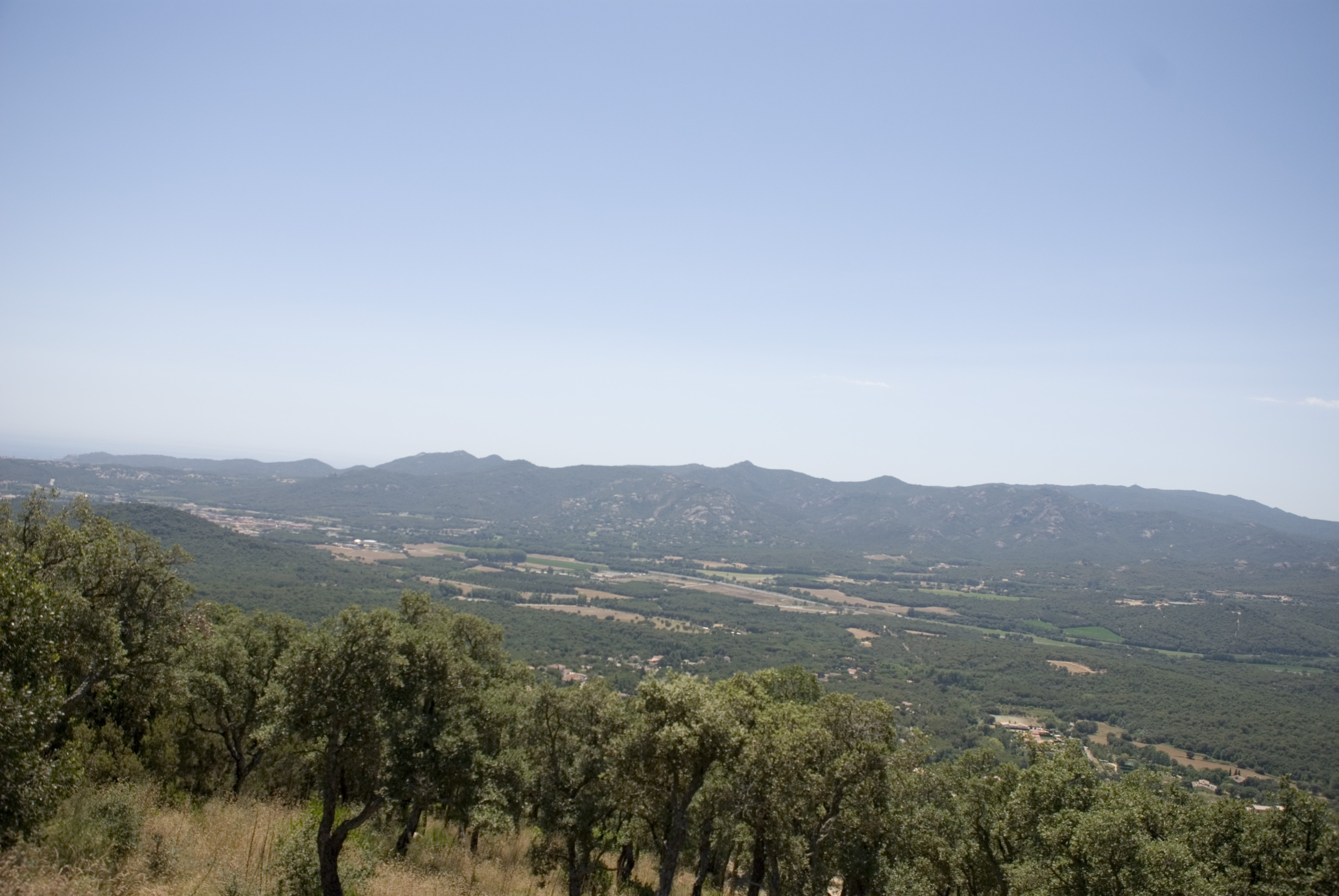

- Coat of arms

- Location in Catalonia Santa Cristina d'Aro (Spain)
- Coordinates: 41°48′53″N 3°0′4″E
- Country: Spain
- Autonomous community: Catalonia
- Province: Girona
- Comarca: Baix Empordà

Government
  - Mayor: Francesc Xavier Sala Congost (2015)

Area
  - Total: 67.6 km^{2} (26.1 sq mi)
- Elevation: 30 m (98 ft)

Population (2025-01-01)
  - Total: 5,987
  - Density: 88.6/km^{2} (229/sq mi)
- Time zone: UTC+1 (CET)
  - Summer (DST): UTC+2 (CEST)
- Postal code: 17246
- Website: santacristina.cat

Santa Cristina d'Aro (Catalan pronunciation: [ˈsantə kɾisˈtinə ˈðaɾu]) is a small town in the Aro river valley (Baix Empordà region) at the junction of the road from Girona/Barcelona to Sant Feliu de Guíxols and Palamós. It is home to a number of workers in the nearby holiday resorts. The Costa Brava golf course is on the outskirts of the town.

The municipality includes the villages of Romanyà de la Selva, Solius and Bell-lloc. It also extends to the coast, including the area of Canyet de Mar.

Between 1892 and 1969, the town was connected to the city of Girona and the port of Sant Feliu de Guíxols by the narrow gauge Sant Feliu de Guíxols–Girona railway. The line has since been converted into a greenway.

== Museums and collections ==
In Santa Cristina d'Aro there are two different museums:

- The 'Enrique Sacristán Zarzuela Museum': comprises a collection of exhibits related to the world of comic opera and the life of the baritone Enrique Sacristán, who dedicated his life to this musical genre. The collection allows visitors to experience this musical world and revisit some of its most memorable moments, with crichures, costumes, posters and photographs, in a celebration of a life dedicated to song.
- 'The House of Magic. The Xevi Collection': otherwise known as the Grand Museum of Magic, is the first museum of its kind in Spain. It is housed in a Catalan farmhouse that dates back to 1800, in Santa Cristina d'Aro. Museum exhibits include automatons, posters, magic devices from different eras, paints... This collection of magic-show exhibits has been compiled by Xevi, the international master of illusion, during his extensive entertainment career all over the world. The museum has been recognised by the Fédération Internationale des Sociétés Magiques (FISM) as the largest and most original of its kind in the world.
- Nativity Dioramas in the Monastery of Solius: A collection of artistic, popular and religious value thanks to Gilbert Galceran, who transcends sensitivity in the smallest details. These dioramas collect the engagement of Mary and Joseph and the childhood of Jesus.
