= Sant Feliu de Guíxols History Museum =

Coordinates: 41.7801°N 3.0266°E

The Sant Feliu de Guíxols History Museum is located on the ground floor and in other plants of the Monestir de Sant Feliu de Guíxols, in the village of Sant Feliu de Guíxols, in the Baix Empordà region.

It is part of the Network of Museums of the Costa Brava, the Network of Maritime Museums of the Catalan Coast and the Territorial Network of Museums of the Counties of Girona.

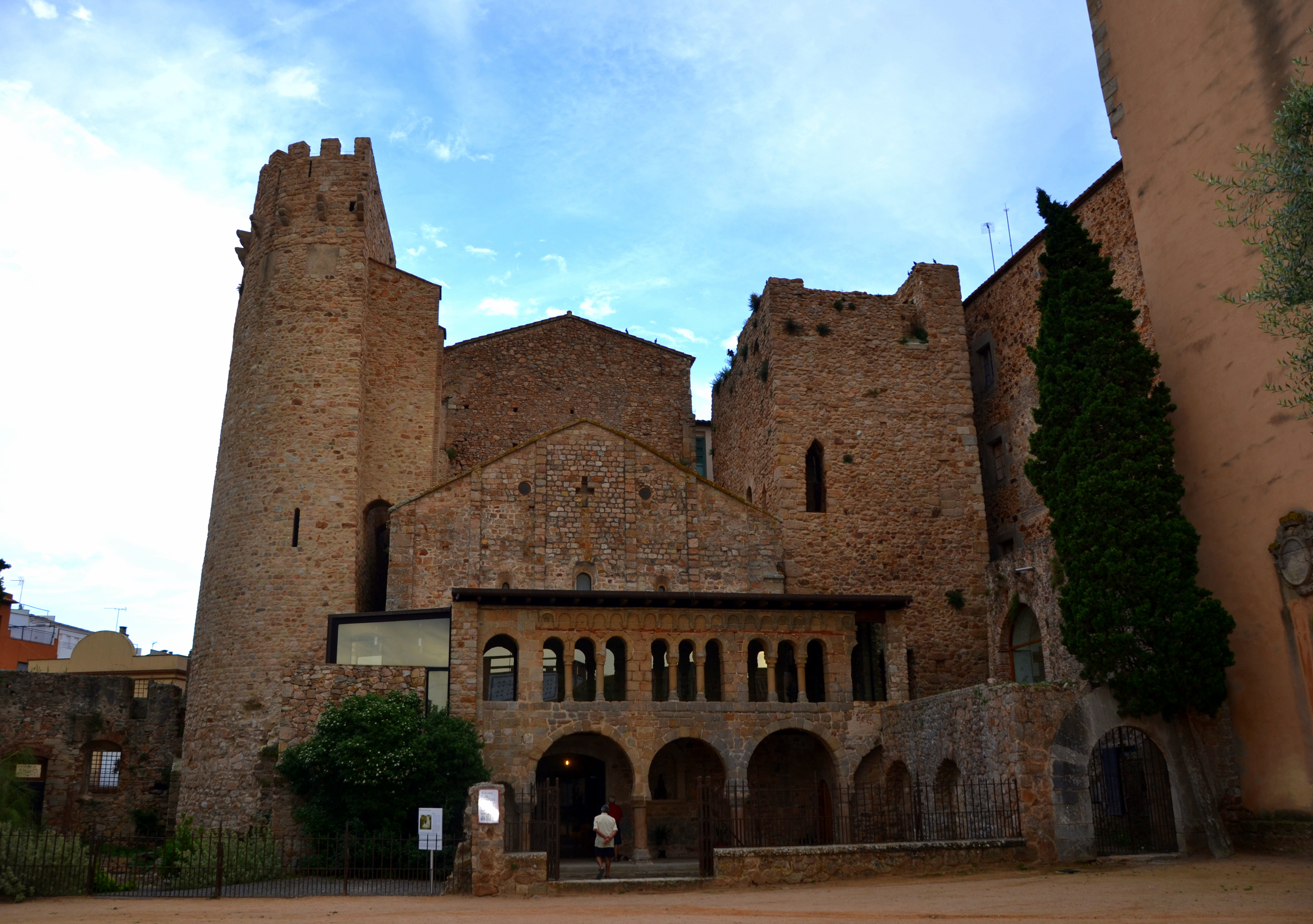
Monastery of Sant Feliu de Guíxols

It's important to stand out its permanent collection of Maritime Salvage, which has its own space in an independent building on the other side of the Passeig del Fortim, the permanent exhibition of the legacy of the painter Josep Albertí, the permanent dedicated to the cork industry and the first millennium archaeological collection. The Museum started with the archaeological findings dated in 1903, in the Iberian settlement of the Guíxols. It is considered that in 1919 it was the year of the constitution of the Museum, but it was consolidated in 1920 as a result of the donation of Dr. Ignasi Melé of archaeological objects. In 1914 the first exhibition of the material was organized in the annexed room of the School of Arts and Crafts of the Monastery and, in the following years, it received small donations that expanded its purely archaeological collections to receive artistic, traditional and labor pieces. The museum resisted the Civil War without there being any mention and it was not until 1951 that it began to dynamise with a relocation within the Monastery. From this moment on, a period of sustained growth begins, with renovations, restorations and gaining space with the transfer of annexed premises, the incorporation of new collections and the decentralization of the collection to the case of The Maritime Rescue Museum, which allows the Museum to grow up to the present.

== Permanent spaces ==
The museum has an extensive collection of articles related to the town's history, from archaeology, to the cork industry and the town's relationship with the sea. Exhibits also include paintings by local artists, such as Josep Albertí, as well as an area devoted to health. Restoration work has opened up spaces for visitors, such as the Romanesque towers of El Fum and el Corn, which flank the unique Pre-Romanesque façade of the Porta Ferrada (Iron Door) and the Palau de l'Abat (Abbot's Palace) areas, with rooms for temporary exhibitions.

=== First millennium ===
Archaeological material from the Fortim, the Tossa and surrounding villages.

=== Health space ===
Medical instruments, furniture and rural doctors.

=== The Cork ===
Related with the cork industry.

=== Espai Llegat Josep Albertí ===
Legacy of the painter Josep Albertí.

=== The Maritime Rescue ===
The collection is based on 87 resources, a total of more than 150 objects that represent almost all of the material from the local Rescue Station.
