= The Maritime Rescue Museum =

Coordinates: 41°46′48″N 3°02′08″E

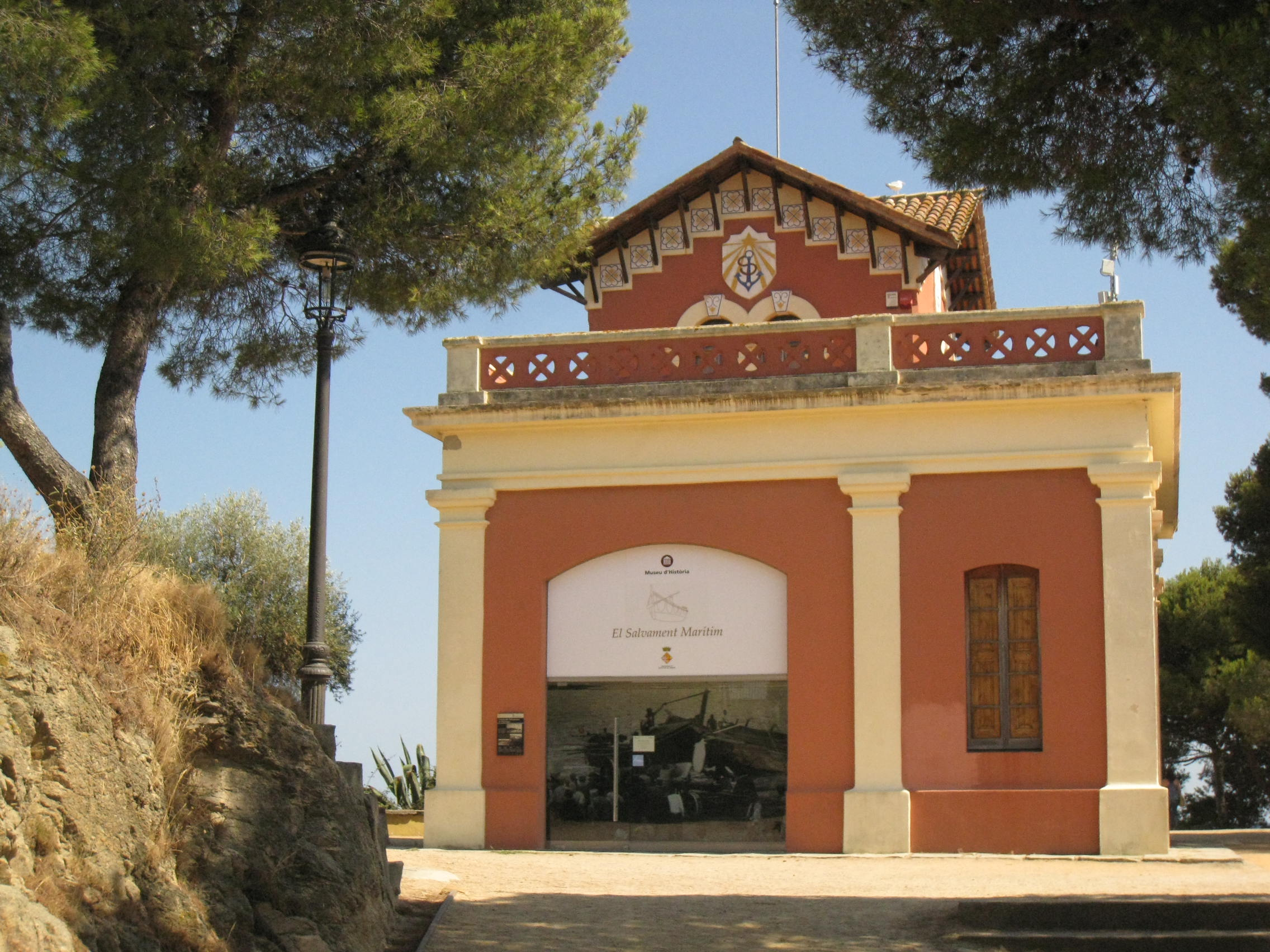
The Maritime Rescue Museum in Sant Feliu de Guíxols

The Maritime Rescue Museum is an old rescue shipwreck station located in the port of Sant Feliu de Guíxols, in the Baix Empordà region of Spain. It was built in the 19th century and it is protected as a Bé Cultural d'Interès Local, a cultural asset of local interest.

As of 2017, it is a branch of the Sant Feliu de Guíxols History Museum, dedicated to marine rescue.

== Description ==
The building was inaugurated in 1890 and it is located 13 m (43 ft) above sea level. This rescue includes the Dawson cable launcher (1890), the Miquel Boera lifeboat with its transport carriage (blessed in 1898) and a whole range of their items. Externally, the combination of backup columns stands out on the ground floor.

A partir del 9 de juliol i fins al 31 d’agost de 2015, l’extensió del Museu sobre el Salvament Marítim estarà oberta en el següent horari: De dilluns a diumenge de 17 a 20 h. Dissabtes, de 10 a 13 i de 17 a 20 h. Festius 1 i 15 d’agost, de 17 a 20 h.

== History ==
The house is located at the point of Els Guíxols, also called Fortim or Salvament, a spur that divides the bay into two natural ports and it is a historical site linked to the defense and protection of the city. There are Iberian settlements from the 5th century BC. In the 7th century, the legend of Saint Felix the African was formed, according to which the martyr was thrown into the sea from the top of Els Guíxols. In 1354, Sant Feliu was a port and avenue of Girona, and in 1443 a Consulate of the Sea was established.

At the end of the 19th century, a Local Shipment Rescue Board was created based on volunteering to help sailors and fishermen. In 1886, it was constituted as a subsidiary of the "Sociedad Española de Salvamento de Náufragos" and promoted the construction of the rescue station with boats and rescue equipment. In 1940 the rescue of wrecked ships was in the hands of the Navy, and in 1971 it was part of the Creu Roja del Mar. The rescue station was no longer used due to its height above sea level.
