= Ca la Pruna - Culture Museum =

16th-century fortified house in Catalonia, Spain

Coordinates: 41°58′14″N 3°08′40″E

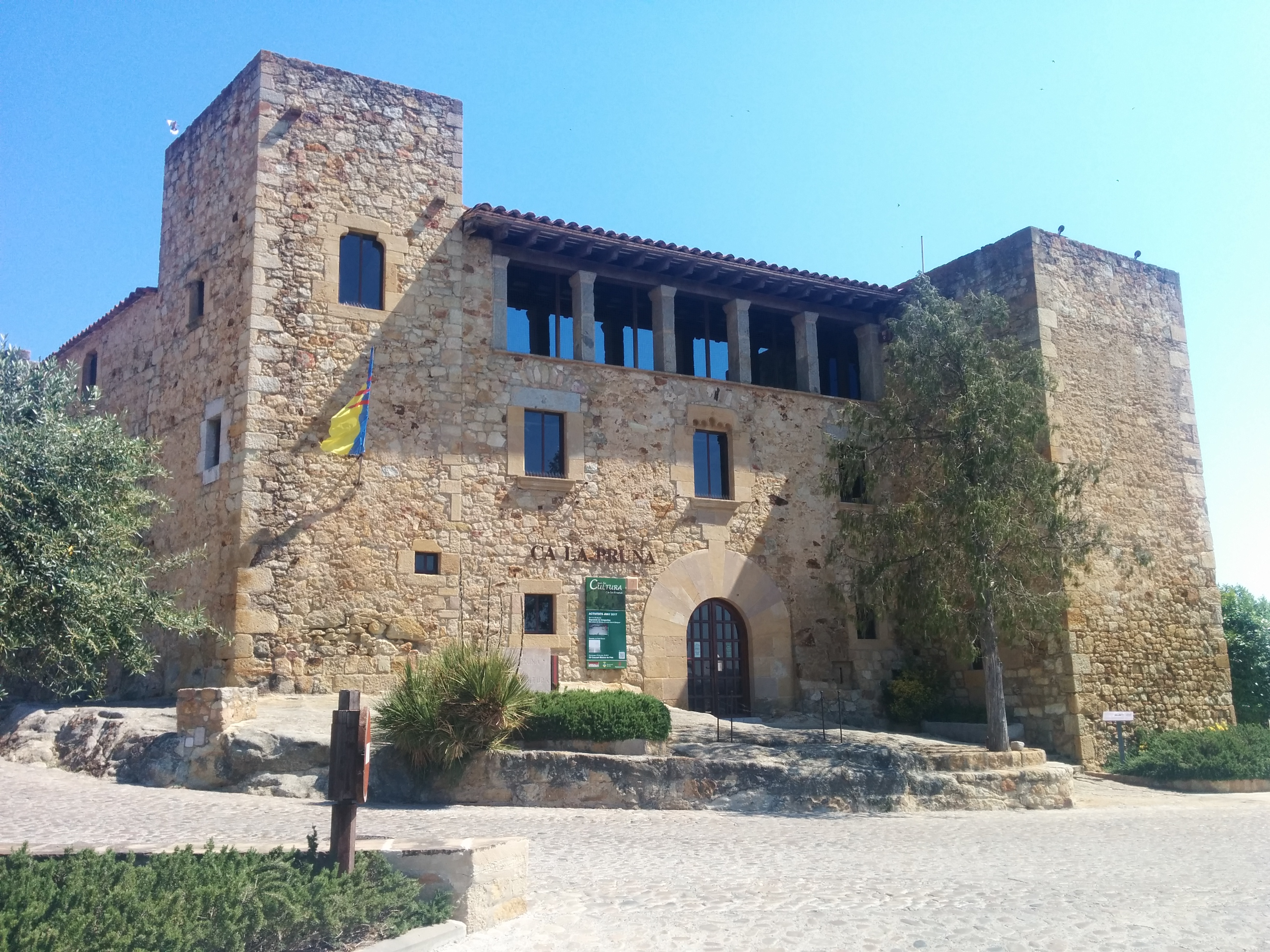
Ca la Pruna

Ca la Pruna is a 16th-century fortified house, in the town of Pals (Baix Empordà region). It is included in the Inventory of the Architectural Heritage of Catalonia.

== Description ==
Ca la Pruna is built on a rocky base and, therefore, adapted to the unevenness of the terrain. The building consists of ground floor, two upper floors and roof tile.

== History ==
"Ca la Pruna" is the current name of Mas Illa, one of the most important houses in the medieval and modern history of Pals. The members of the Illa family appear documented in the early 15th century, linked to the cultivation and commercialization of rice. In fact, old documents reveal the existence of a rice mill on the ground floor of the farmhouse. The building was burned during the First Carlist War (1833) and significantly altered by the restoration of the 1970s. In spite of this, remains of low-medieval walls and different enlargements of the 16th-18th centuries are still visible.

The building was purchased by three neighbors of Pals (Antoni Vila Casas, Francesc Jover and Xavier Millet Tusell) who donated it to the municipality as a Culture House.

== Ca la Pruna - Culture Museum ==
Once the building was acquired by the Town Hall of Pals, the Ca la Pruna Culture Museum was created as a cultural center where several activities are organized. Currently, it offers the permanent exhibition "Viure a pagès", which shows a selection of the pieces related with the countryside. In this way, the exhibition contains a wide variety of farm tools, measures and weights, and it explains the use that was given to animals, the rooms of a Catalan farmhouse, etc.

In addition, in summer, it hosts various exhibitions of painting, sculpture, ceramics ... and during the winter different cultural activities are organized such as conferences, courses, cinema, meetings of other social entities. Also it is the headquarter of two organizations: the Comunitat de Regants and the Associació per a la Defensa Vegetal de l'Arròs.
