= Doll Museum of Castell d'Aro =

Coordinates: 41°48′53″N 3°01′51″E

- Museu de la Nina de Castell d'Aro
- Established: 1997
- Location: Castell d'Aro, Catalonia, Spain
- Type: Doll museum

The Doll Museum of Castell d'Aro (Museu de la Nina de Castell d'Aro) is a doll museum in the village of Castell d'Aro, Spain. The museum is located in the Nova Llar building, between the Benedormiens Castle (castell de Benedormiens) and the Lluís Companys Square, in the middle of the old town.

The museum has undergone refurbishments in order to expand and improve its facilities. It was expected to reopen in 2017.

== History ==
The museum was founded in 1997 thanks to a donation from Josefina Teixidor. Its main aim was to exhibit dolls as a facet of culture and society.

== Collections ==
The museum is divided into two different parts. On the ground floor, there is a collection of international dolls and an exhibition of 245 crocheted dolls, which were donated by the Grau Muntada family. There are also exhibits that have been created exclusively for collectors of the Barbie and D'Antón brands.

The first floor holds the Neus Borrell private collection of antique dolls.
