= Museum of the Mediterranean =

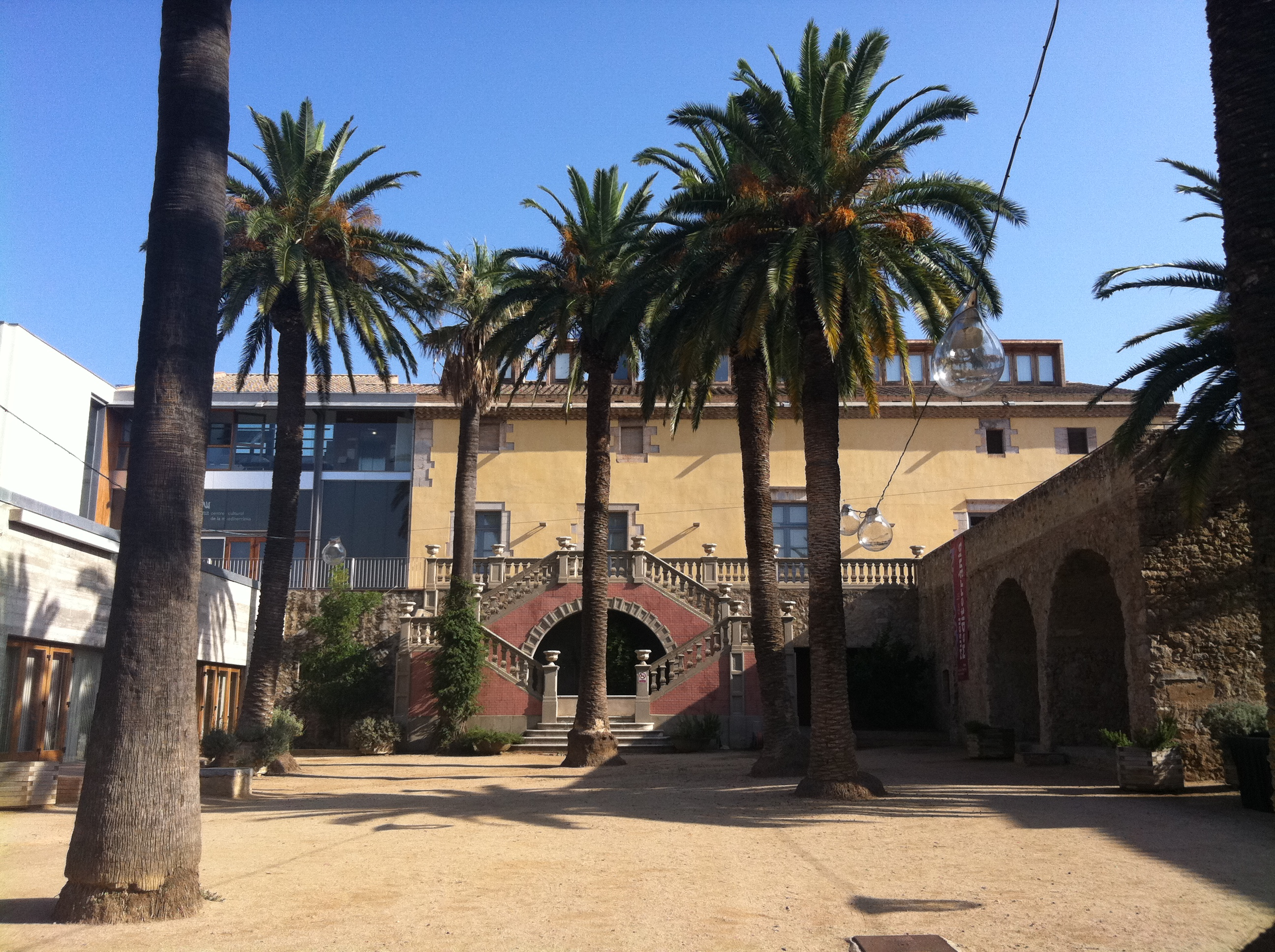
- Can Quintana, home of the museum

- Location within Catalonia
- Established: 1982 (Casa Pastors) transferred and refunded in May 2003
- Location: Can Quintana, Torroella de Montgrí
- Coordinates: 42°02′28″N 3°07′29″E
- Type: Ethnology museum
- Director: Gerard Cruset
- Website: museudelamediterrania.cat

The Museum of the Mediterranean is a museum in Torroella de Montgrí, Catalonia, Spain.

The museum was founded in 2003, in an attempt to become an area for knowledge, reflection and research for the problems and worries that affect citizens in the 21st century. It is housed in Can Quintana, a 16th-century building. It is dedicated to the knowledge and communication of the Mediterranean Sea and uses the natural sounds, human sounds and music to show the reality of the land, the history and the culture of the village of Torroella, connected with the others Mediterranean cultures and towns. It pretends to become a site to think about the nearest territory and the main issues that affect the different Mediterranean nations.

It is also an Interpretation Centre of the Natural Park of Montgrí, Medes Islands and Lower Ter. Besides, it hosts the Documentation Centre of Montgrí, Medes Islands and Lower Ter and the Academic Chair of Littoral Mediterranean Ecosystems.

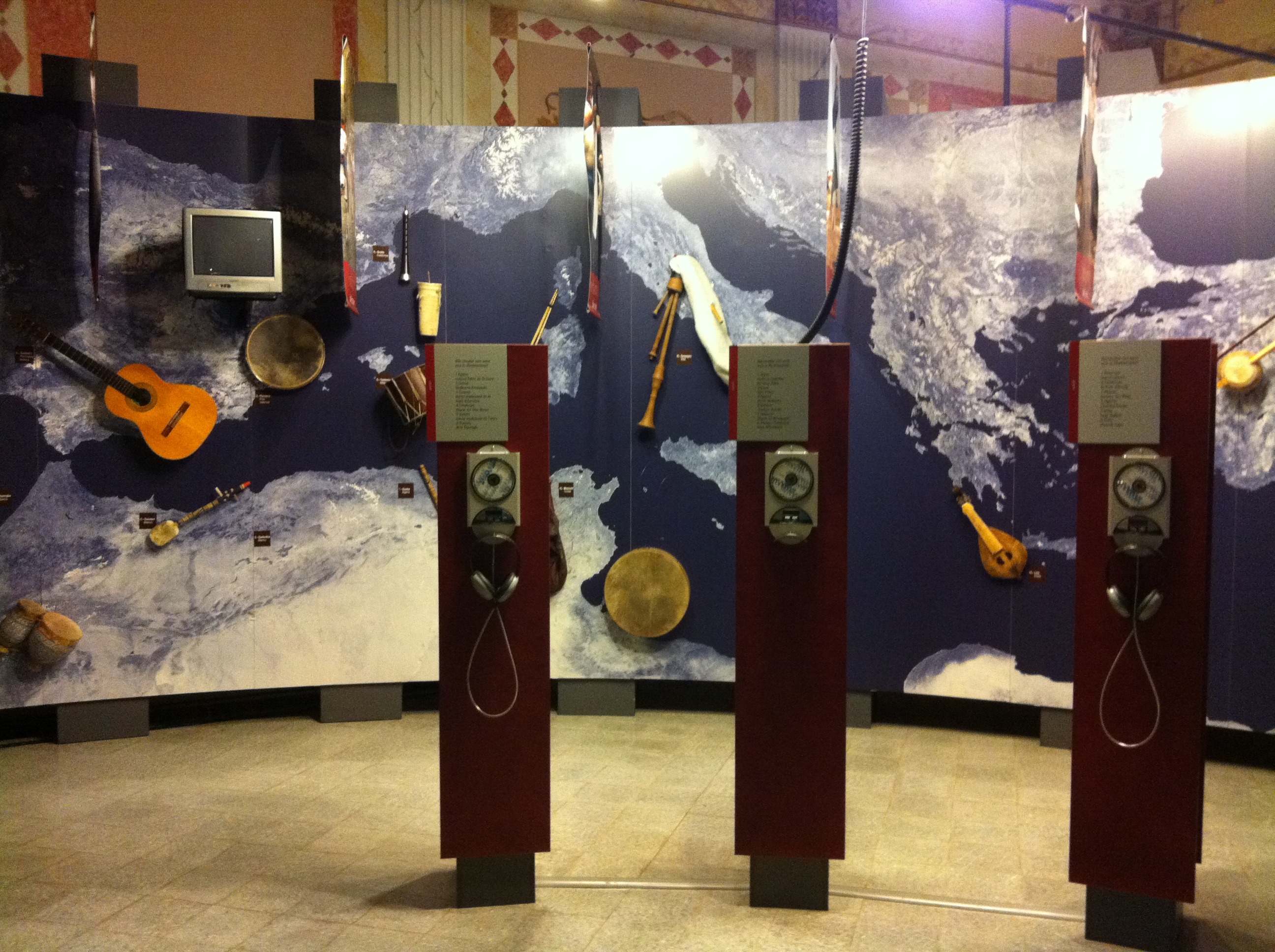
The Museum of the Mediterranean

== History of the museum ==
The Museum of the Mediterranean was the descendant of Museum of Montgrí and Lower Ter, known as the Museum of Montgrí, founded at the early 1980s. This old museum was located in Casa Pastors, an ancient building of the town and it used to collect and communicate the multiple cultural and natural heritage of the town and surrounding territory. The moving to the building of Can Quintana, in May 2003, it was the opportunity to modernize the exhibitions and topics, now focused into Mediterranean natural and cultural heritage.

This museum is part of the Territorial Network of Museums of the Counties of Girona, the Network of Museums of the Costa Brava, the Network of Maritime Museums of the Catalan Coast and the Network of Museums of Ethnology of Catalonia. It is also part of the Observatory of the Ethnological and Immaterial Heritage.

== The historical building of Can Quintana ==
Can Quintana is an historical building of the village. It is and old masia, atypically located inside the town walls, that has been cataloged between the late 16th century and the early 17th century. It has a ground floor -adapted as a reception, temporary exhibitions, classrooms and auditorium-, a floor -where there is located the permanent exhibition-, and an attic -occupied by the offices and Documentation Center-, as well, there is a courtyard on the back of the building. At the beginning of the 20th century (1907–1908), the interiors of the house were decorated by Rafael Masó. Of his activity, we can appreciate the wooden ceiling or the outdoors stairway. The building also has other ornamental elements such as the pictorial remains and some noble rooms, located in the first floor.

The house was the ancient residence of the Quintana family, a wealthy owners and traders of oil and wine. Actually, on the ground floor, it is possible to see an oil mill that has an inscription from 1703. The most notable head of family was Albert Quintana i Combis, a liberal politician of the Catalan Renaixença (a 19TH century Catalan nationalism wave) He held different positions in the Spanish Administration, such as head of Huesca province, Spanish legislator and senator, and secretary and intendent in the island of Cuba. He also was a poet and he called himself as El Cantor del Ter (The Singer of Ter).

On the opposite of the garden of Can Quintana there is the Pere Blasi Municipal Library, becoming Can Quintana as an important cultural center of the town. In this way, this building hosts concerts and other public activities with relative frequency.

== Spaces ==
- Welcome
- Territory and history
- The music
- A sea of all

== Collection ==
The museum's collection is centered on the nearby Mediterranean, focusing on the visit to a participatory experience. The collection exposes parts of history, nature and Mediterranean music.

- "Pic del Montgrí" stone
- Montgrí Castle capital
- Catalan Shawm
- Flabiol
- Cretan lyre
- Launeddas

== Center of Interpretation of the Natural Park of Montgrí, the Medes Islands and the Baix Ter ==
The Center of Interpretation of the Natural Park of Montgrí, the Medes Islands and the Baix Ter, also located in the Museum of the Mediterranean, is a space to discover the wealth of the cultural and natural heritage of the territory, which is part of the network of Specialized Libraries of the Generalitat de Catalunya (BEG). In this way, it represents the tool for the study, research and dissemination of the territory of the Montgrí massif, the Baix Ter plain and the Medes Islands. Apart from this territorial area, the Interpretation Center has another topic that is the sardana, a traditional Catalan dance.
