= Monestir de Sant Feliu de Guíxols =

Benedictine monastery in Sant Feliu de Guíxols, Catalonia, Spain

Coordinates: 41.7800°N 3.0266°E

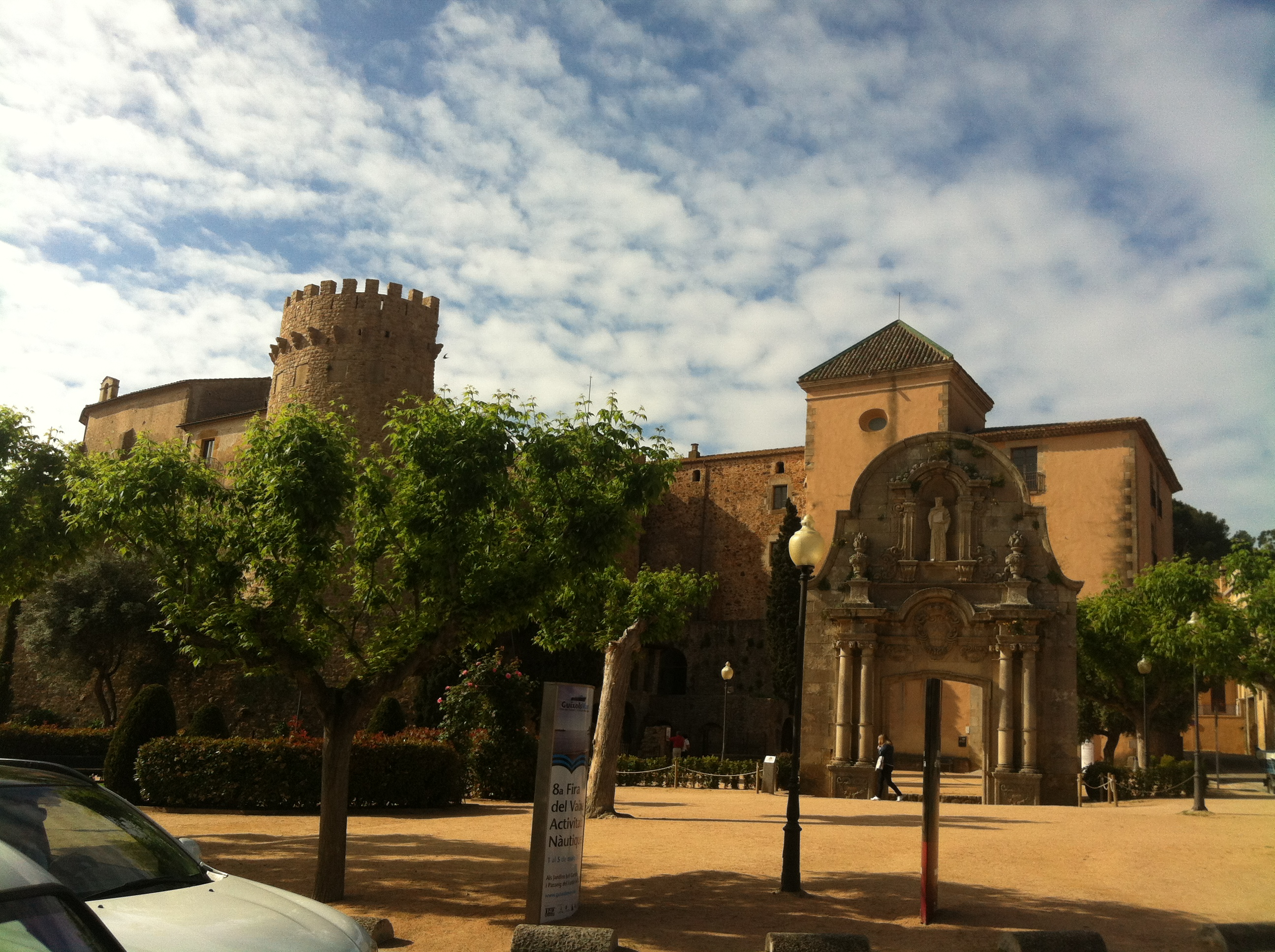
Monestir de Sant Feliu de Guíxols

Monestir de Sant Feliu de Guíxols is a Benedictine monastery in Sant Feliu de Guíxols, in the comarca of the Baix Empordà in Catalonia, Spain. It was first referenced around the year 961, and was declared a Bien de Interés Cultural (Bé d'Interès Cultural in Catalan) landmark in 1931.

The Romanesque building is an excellent example of the town's medieval architecture and has been remodeled several times. It includes the Porta Ferrada, the symbol of the town, as well as two towers. It houses a history museum.

On the basis of available records, the foundation of the Benedictine monastery can be traced back to the first half of the 10th century. The bay of Guixols was chosen due to its good natural harbour and the proximity to the coast of the nearby range of hills, which would make it easier to flee and would give a certain degree of protection in cases of attack from the sea. The decision was no doubt also influenced by the martyrdom of Saint Felix of Africa and the opportunity to take advantage of existing buildings dating from the Roman period.

The monastery's role was to control the agricultural exploitation and production of the surrounding region, and also to provide protection to its inhabitants in return. It was thus a fortified coastal monastery exercising its feudal dominion over the territory. At its foundation, the monastery was dedicated to Saint Felix and the name of Sant Feliu (in its Catalan form) was thereafter forever associated with that of Guíxols, thus giving the present-day name of the town (used from the 10th century onwards).

== Gallery ==
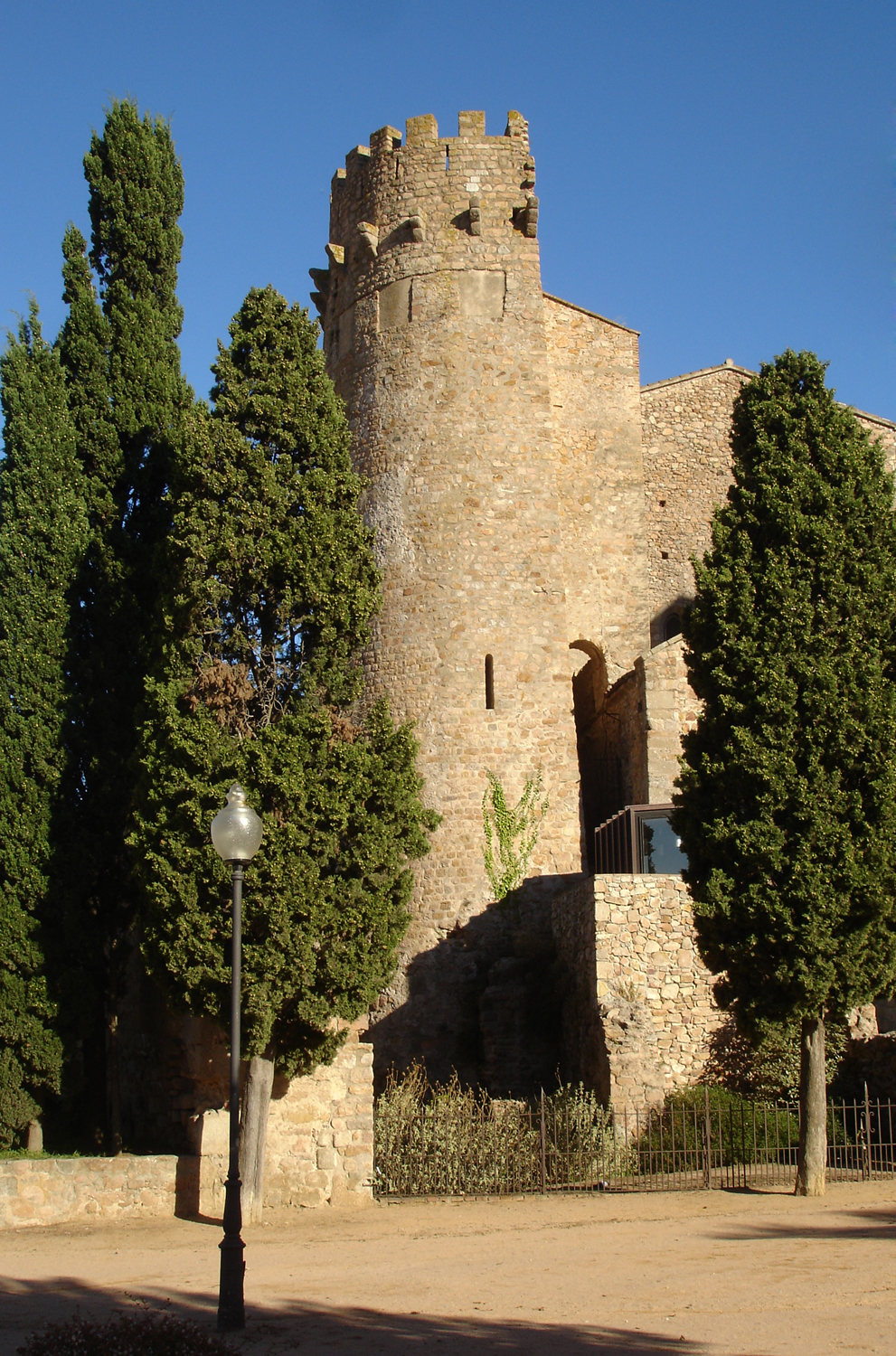
Torre de Fum

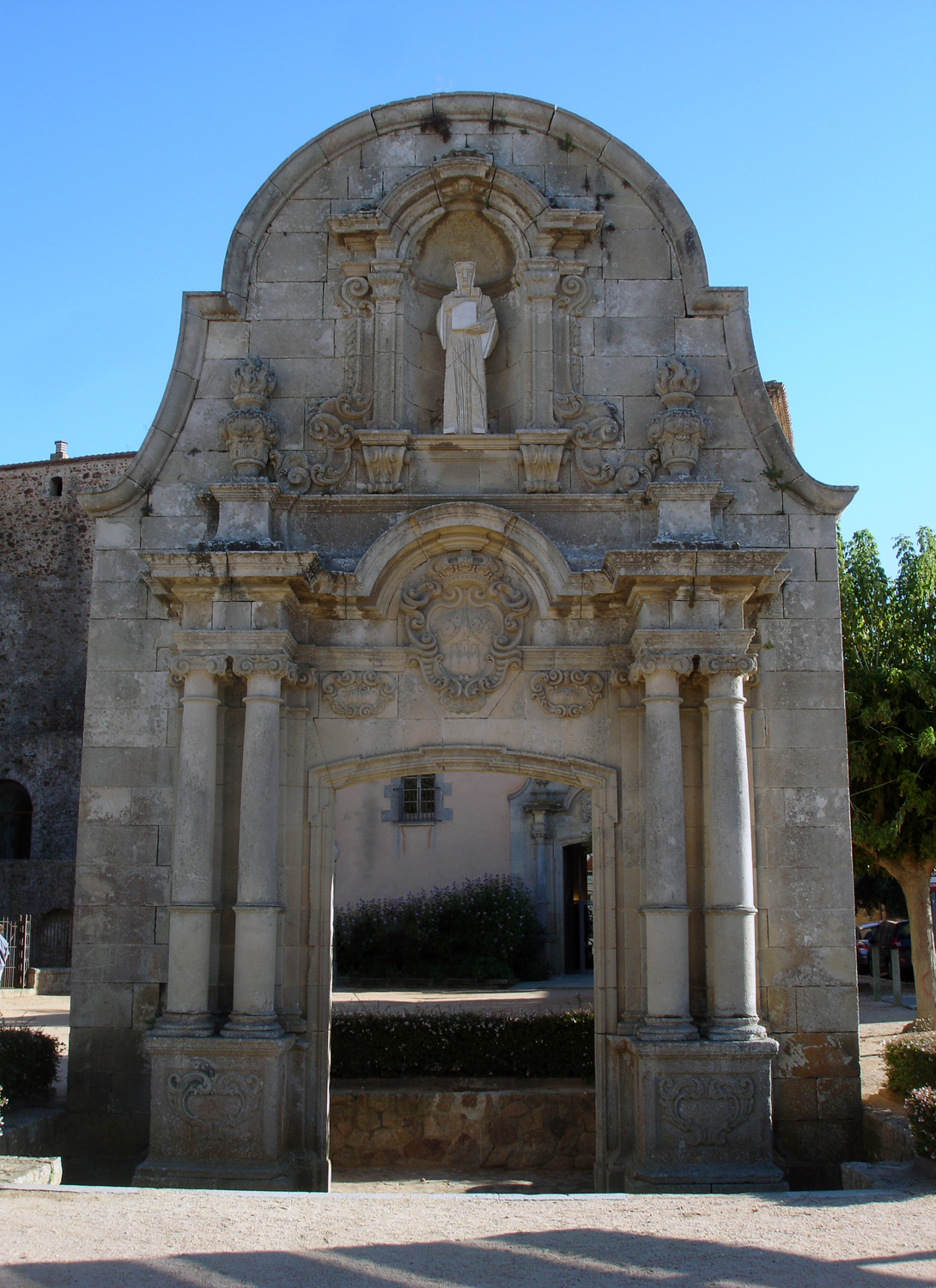
Arc de Sant Benet

Plan

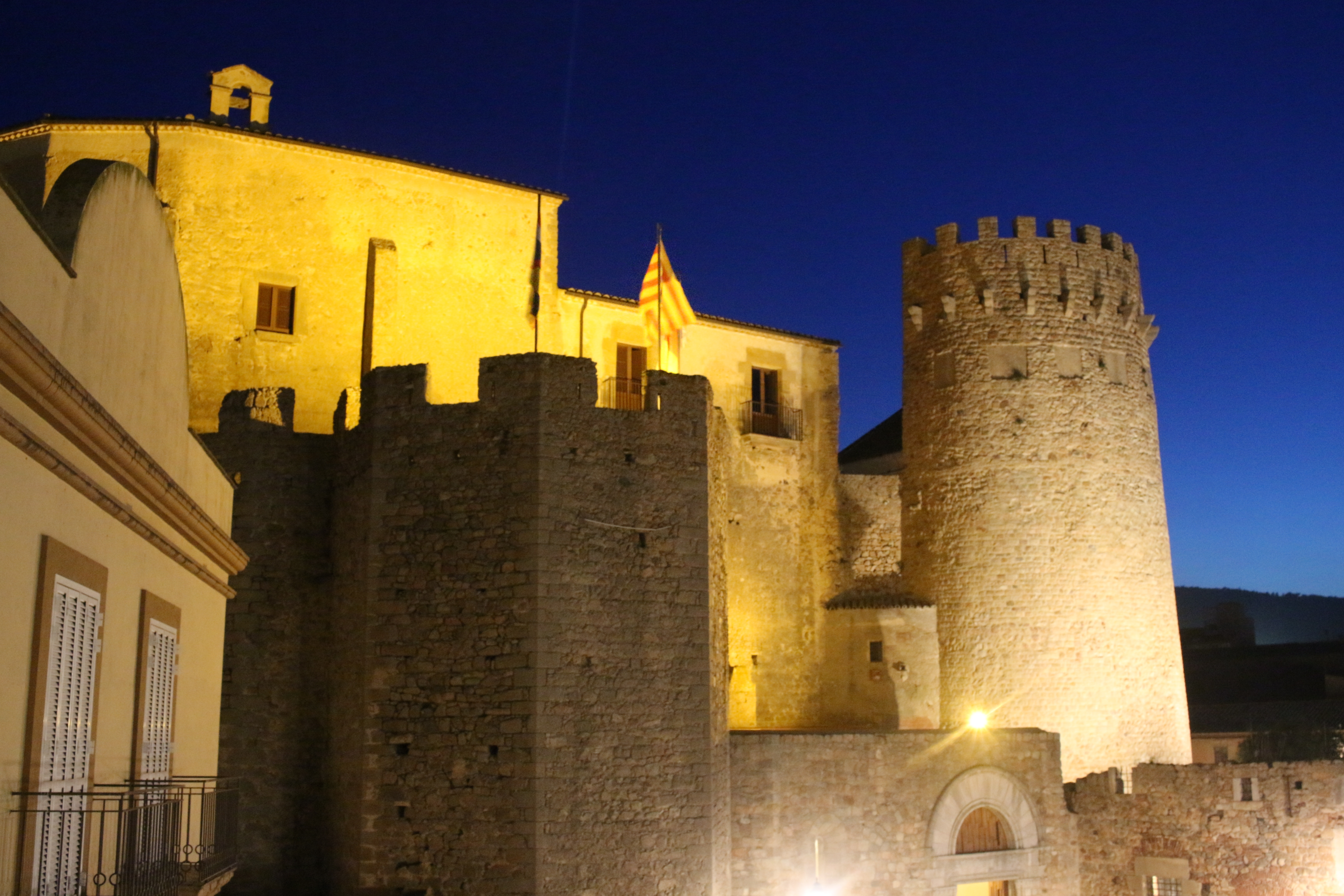
Monestir at night.
