= The Jam Museum =

Coordinates: 41°57′08″N 3°07′41″E

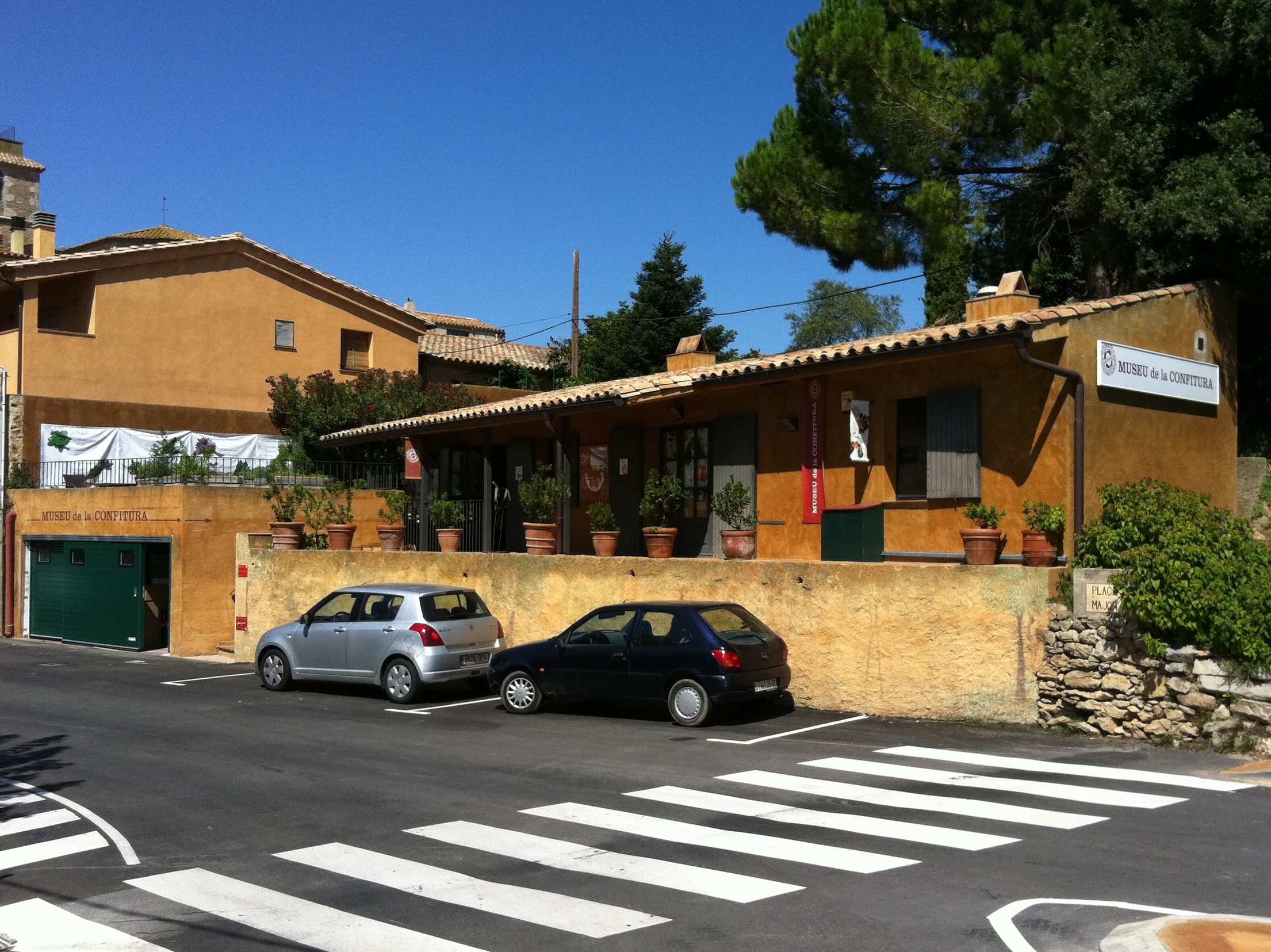
The Jam Museum in Torrent (Baix Empordà)

The Jam Museum is a gastronomic museum opened in 2004 in Torrent, in the Baix Empordà region of Spain. Its creator is Georgina Regàs, also author of the book 70 confitures.

== Description ==
In its workshop, jams and jellies are made from over 114 flavors. The museum is a space created to discover all the secrets that are hidden in a jar of jam. There are confitures for all tastes: from exotic or traditional fruits, sweet or bitter, classic or unknown, etc. Adult courses and workshop for children from 6 to 12 years old are organized, and they have a specialized library and a collection of confitures from different countries.

== Awards and recognitions ==
- 2010: gold medal for cumquat jam
- 2011: bronze medal for bitter orange jam
- 2012: silver medal for lemon jam; silver medal for orange marmalade with Grand Marnier; bronze medal for bitter orange jam and chocolate
- 2013: bronze medal for bitter orange jam
- 2014: gold medal: bitter orange jelly; silver medal: bitter orange jam; bronze medal: orange orange jam; bronze medal: orange marmalade with rosemary and black pepper from Rimbas
- 2015: gold medal for bitter orange jam; bronze medal for grapefruit jam and Beefeater
- 2016: silver medal for bitter orange jam (silver cut); silver medal for orange marmalade with citrus caviar

Apart from the medals awarded by the Dalmatian Marmalade Festival for citrus jams, the Museum has received other awards and recognitions:

- 2009: Gourmand Prize for the first edition in Spanish of the book "70 confitures"
- 2012: Timó d'Argent Award to Georgina Regàs awarded by the Unió d'Empresaris d'Hostaleria i Turisme de la Costa Brava
- 2013: Third Prize Germán Arrien to Georgina Regàs
- 2013: Gourmand Prize for the best illustrated Spanish cookbook in 2012 for the book "Els Secrets de les Confitures", written jointly by Georgina Regàs and Pere Castells
- 2015: Mercader Award to Georgina Regàs awarded by the Gastronomic Forum of Girona
- 2016: Girona Quality Seal Excellent for tomato preserves, Mas Marcè sheep cheese and oregano flower in the category Almívars i Conserves - Specialties Singulars
