= The Terracotta Ceramics Museum =

Pottery museum in Spain

The Terracotta Museum, in La Bisbal d'Empordà, is a museum of pottery and industrial ceramics that was opened in 1991.

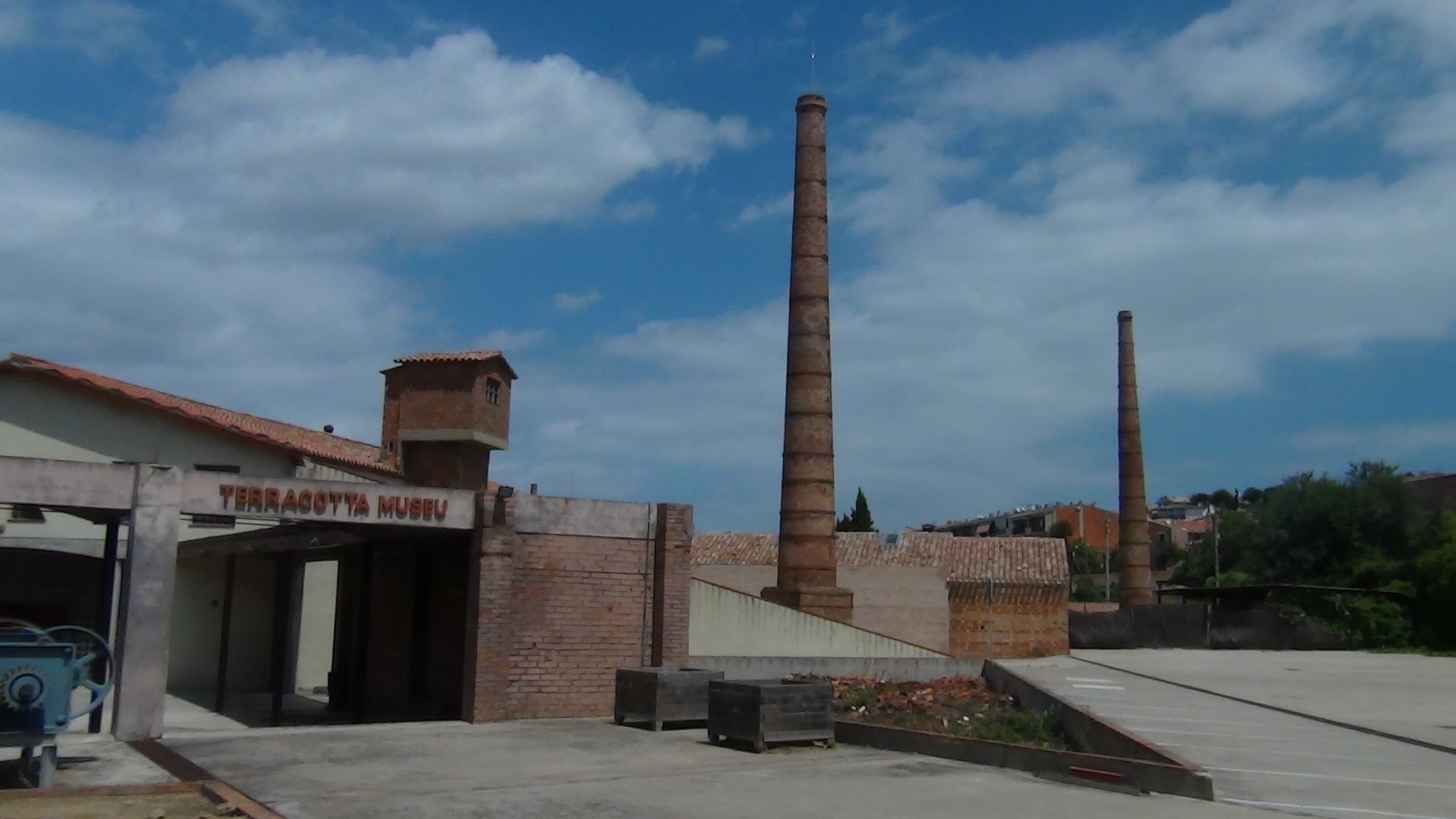
The Terracotta Ceramics Museum

The museum is part of the Museums Network of the Costa Brava and the Territorial Network of Museums of the Counties of Girona.

== The building ==
The museum is located in the old Terracotta ceramic factory, the oldest of La Bisbal d'Empordà. It was founded in 1928, but the building was built in 1922. The factory definitively stopped its industrial activity in 1984, and three years later it was acquired by the city council and was renovated to install the museum.

The integration into the exhibition of some of the elements of the production process (rafts, chimneys, ovens ...) makes the building one of the most outstanding objects of the Museum.

== History ==
Ceramics has been the most emblematic activity of La Bisbal d'Empordà. One of the main economic engines of the city has been set up as a result, increasing to an important percentatge the employment of the local population. On the other hand, we are faced with an activity that starts from time backwards (the first documentary news that gives the reason of the potter's office in La Bisbal was in 1511). The museum was opened in 1991 with a temporary exhibition hall and in 1998, after the remodeling, the permanent exhibition was opened to the public. In 2010, the museum closed doors to do another rehabilitation, which ended in 2015.

== Exhibition ==
The Terracotta Museum has a collection of up to 11,000 pieces, including about 3,000 from all over the Iberian Peninsula and ceded by the Generalitat de Catalunya. The exhibition has four thematic axes about ceramics, pre industrial ceramics, industrial development and a tribute to its creators. You can also visit the old furnaces and chimneys of the Terracotta factory.

=== Areas ===
- Ceramics: The development of the ceramics industry depends to a large extent on the environmental conditions of the area where this activity is carried out. The massif of Les Gavarres is the natural area that traditionally has provided La Bisbal raw materials and, after all, has made the development of its industry possible. Ceramic objects, both glazed and tile, are, in all their simplicity and everyday life, one of the human manifestations that best explain the changes and historical evolution. They appear in all civilizations and in all historical times.
- Pre-industrial ceramics: Tile and pottery are two handicraft activities related to a rural, agrarian and subsistence economy model. The pieces of railing are made by hand, following an identical work process in which only the mold of wood is changed that must form. La Bisbal pottery is characterized by being baked, cooked only once in wood furnaces and with three main types of finish: the Rustic or matte, smoked and glazed or glazed.
- Industrial ceramics: The use of machines in the ceramic industry revolutionized the traditional production system, and caused that some typical tasks of the potter, which often represented a considerable investment of time and effort, were made in a matter of minutes by a machine. It's important to point out that the industrialization of ceramics does not occur suddenly but gradually.
- Creators: At the beginning of the 20th century, and beyond the modernism, some specialized artisans and artists promoted the field of artistic ceramics thanks to an intensa activity, that meant the first recognition of the aesthetic and decorative values of the ceramics. In 1940, the decline in traditional pottery production worsens, as well as, increases the consolidation of a major cultural, economic and social change towards a much more urban and industrial model of society. Nevertheless, the tourism boom avoided a situation of disruption of the ceramics industry. From then until today, the artisan ceramics will experience a gradual transformation, varying traditional uses depending on the aesthetic demands of this new public and adapting their designs and colors to the tastes of the new consumers.

=== Featured objects ===
- Land: Land is the basic material that potters use for the manufacture of objects. It, mixed with water, becomes a plastic mass that can be molded, which preserves the shape given after drying and, once cooked, acquires great hardness.
- Pot: The ceramics industry appears in all civilizations and at all times. The obvious formal similarity that is seen between objects of very different historical periods and between different cultures, demonstrates the universality and durability of some basic typologies, especially those related to food.
- Measure of wine:
- Modernist pitcher: Throughout the early 20th century, the traditional Bisbal pottery industry gradually entered into a crisis, affected by the structural change that implied the progressive transformation of a rural society to an urban future. This situation, however, has stimulate the appearance of other alternative manufactures, such as the decorative ceramics.
