= The House of Magic. The Xevi Collection =

Coordinates: 41°48′53″N 3°00′05″E

The House of Magic is a museum of magic artifacts in the municipality of Santa Cristina d'Aro (Baix Empordà region) in Spain. Located in an 1850 Catalan farmhouse, it is the only magic museum in Spain.

The museum is run by and based on the collection of Xavier Sala i Costa, an internationally known illusionist. It contains magic-related automata, posters, magic devices, paintings, card decks and tarot books, curious objects and photographs.

In 2014, the International Federation of Magic Societies (FISM) recognized i Costa for the creation of the museum, as well as for the originality of the equipment. FISM also recognized it as the largest and most original magic museum in the world.
