= The Mascort Foundation =

The Mascort Foundation is a private foundation located in the municipality of Torroella de Montgrí, in the Baix Empordà region, created in 2007 by Ramon Mascort Amigó, current president of the entity. This foundation was created thanks to his passion for art and collecting, as well as for his interest in the photography. Its first headquarter was the Casa Galibern, the old house of the maternal grandmother.

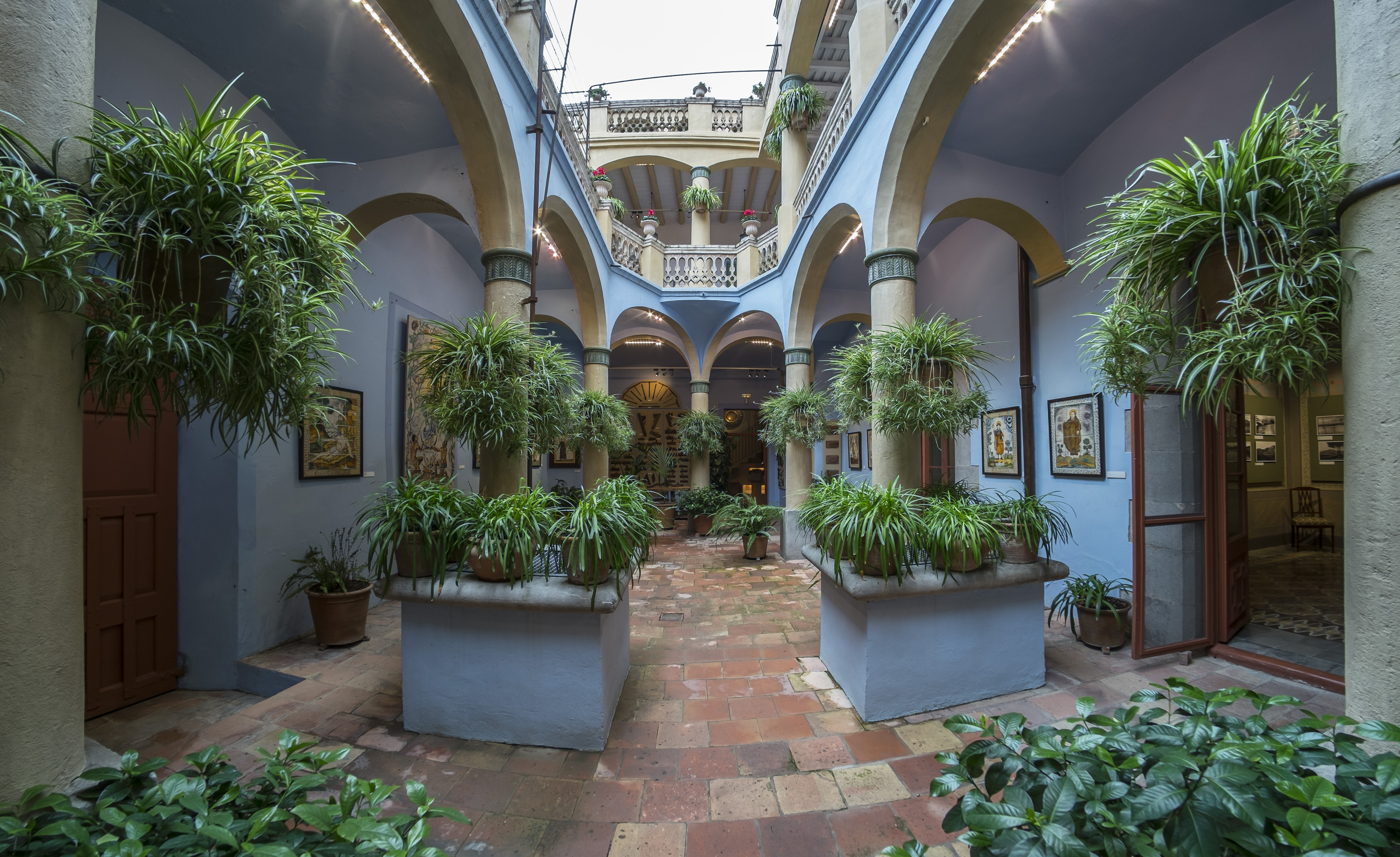
The Mascort Foundation

The purpose of the foundation is to host exhibitions and other events around the three pillars: knowledge and study of history, understanding and enjoyment of art and the defense and protection of nature.
