= Sant Feliu de Guíxols =

- Municipality
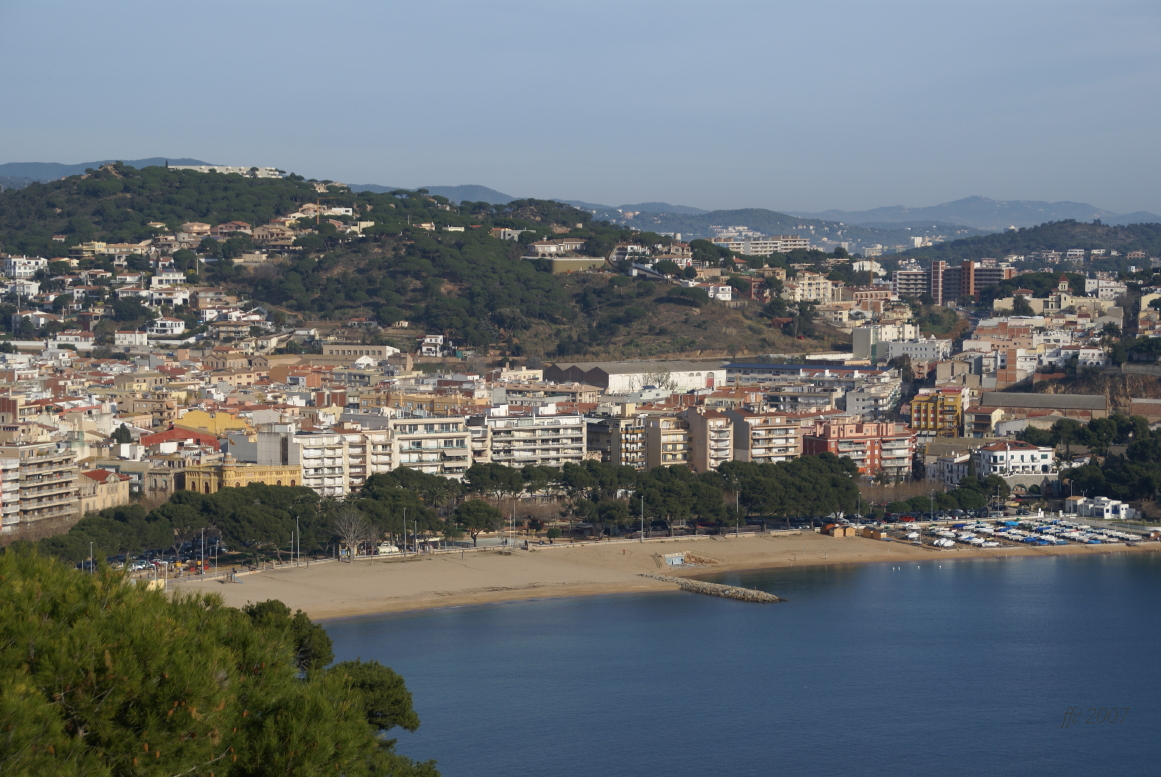

- Flag Coat of arms

- Location in Catalonia Sant Feliu de Guíxols (Catalonia) Sant Feliu de Guíxols (Spain)
- Coordinates: 41°47′N 3°02′E
- Country: Spain
- Community: Catalonia
- Province: Girona
- Comarca: Baix Empordà

Government
  - Mayor: Carles Motas López (2015)

Area
  - Total: 16.2 km^{2} (6.3 sq mi)
- Elevation: 4 m (13 ft)

Population (2014)
  - Total: 21,810
  - Density: 1,350/km^{2} (3,490/sq mi)
- Demonym(s): guixolenc/guixolenca, ganxó/ganxona
- Website: guixols.cat

Sant Feliu de Guíxols (Catalan pronunciation: [ˈsaɱ fəˈliw ðə ˈɣiʃuls]) is a municipality in the comarca of the Baix Empordà in Catalonia, Spain. It is situated on the Costa Brava and is an important port and tourist centre. The district abuts to the north, the upmarket s'Agaró resort built round the Sant Pol Beach. In addition to tourism and the port the cork industry is a traditionally local industry. The town contains a large monastery which now houses the town museum and is a protected historico-artistic monument.

The C-253 road runs north near the coast from Sant Feliu de Guíxols to Platja d'Aro and Palamós, while the C-65 road runs inland from the town. The GI-682 provides a dramatic cliff top drive to Tossa de Mar to the south.

Sant Feliu de Guíxols is a staging point on the GR 92 long-distance footpath, which runs the length of the Mediterranean coast of Spain. Stage 9, to the north, closely follows the coast via S'Agaró, Platja d'Aro and Sant Antoni de Calonge to the next staging point at Palamós, a distance of 16.8 kilometres (10.4 mi). Stage 10, to the south, takes a largely inland route to the next staging point at Tossa de Mar, a distance of 20.2 kilometres (12.6 mi).

== Geography and climate ==
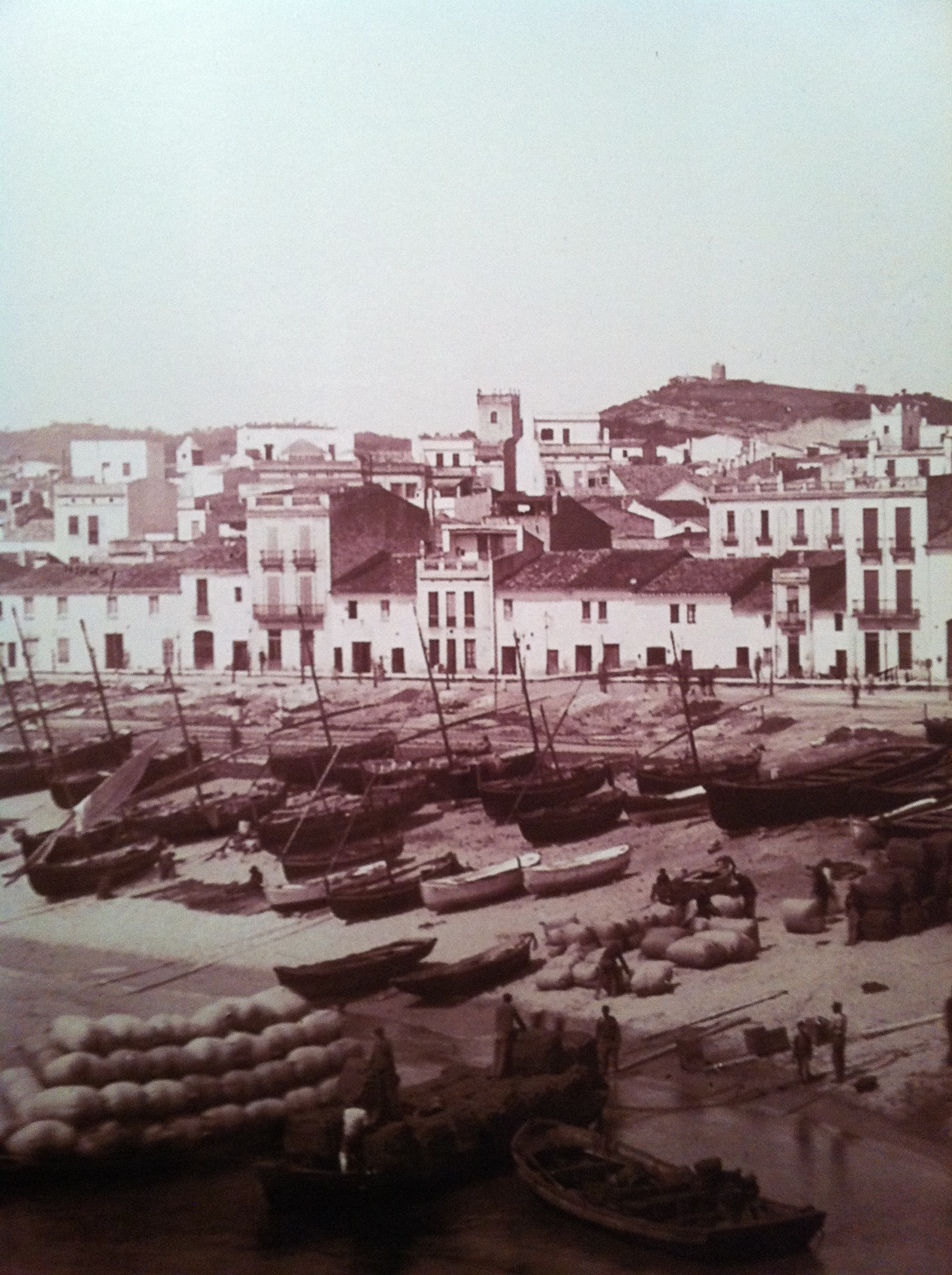
View of the old port of Sant Feliu de Guíxols.

Located on the Mediterranean, the coastline of Sant Feliu de Guíxols spreads over ten kilometres (6.2 miles). It also includes many little bays with coves surrounded by pines with rocky or sand beaches. The beaches are cleaned daily and a modern water treatment system prevents wastewater from entering the sea. The town is engulfed by small mountains, with forests of pine, oak, and cork trees.

Besides the town of Sant Feliu de Guíxols, the municipality includes the following localities:

- Bujonis
- El Vilar d'Aro
- Les Bateries
- Sant Amanç
- Sant Pol
- Mas Trempat
- Vilartagues
- la Casa Nova
- les Comes

== Etymology ==
The name Sant Feliu goes back to the martyred saint, Felix of Girona (d. August 31, 304), who came from Carthage in North Africa. Guíxols is a word derived from the former word iecsalis from a tenth-century document that mentions the monastery and seems to mean "rope-maker".

== History ==
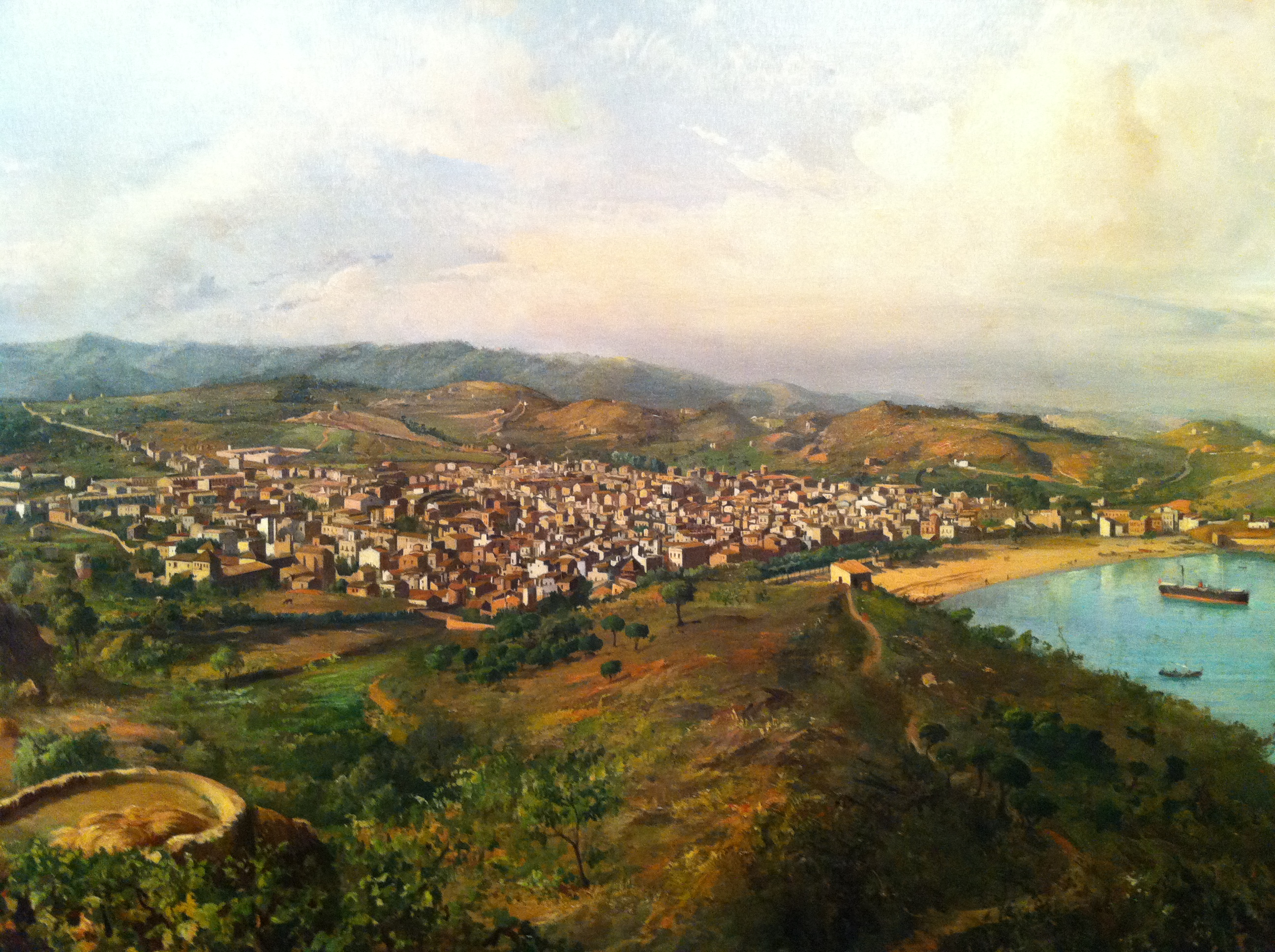
Sant Feliu de Guíxols in 1894.

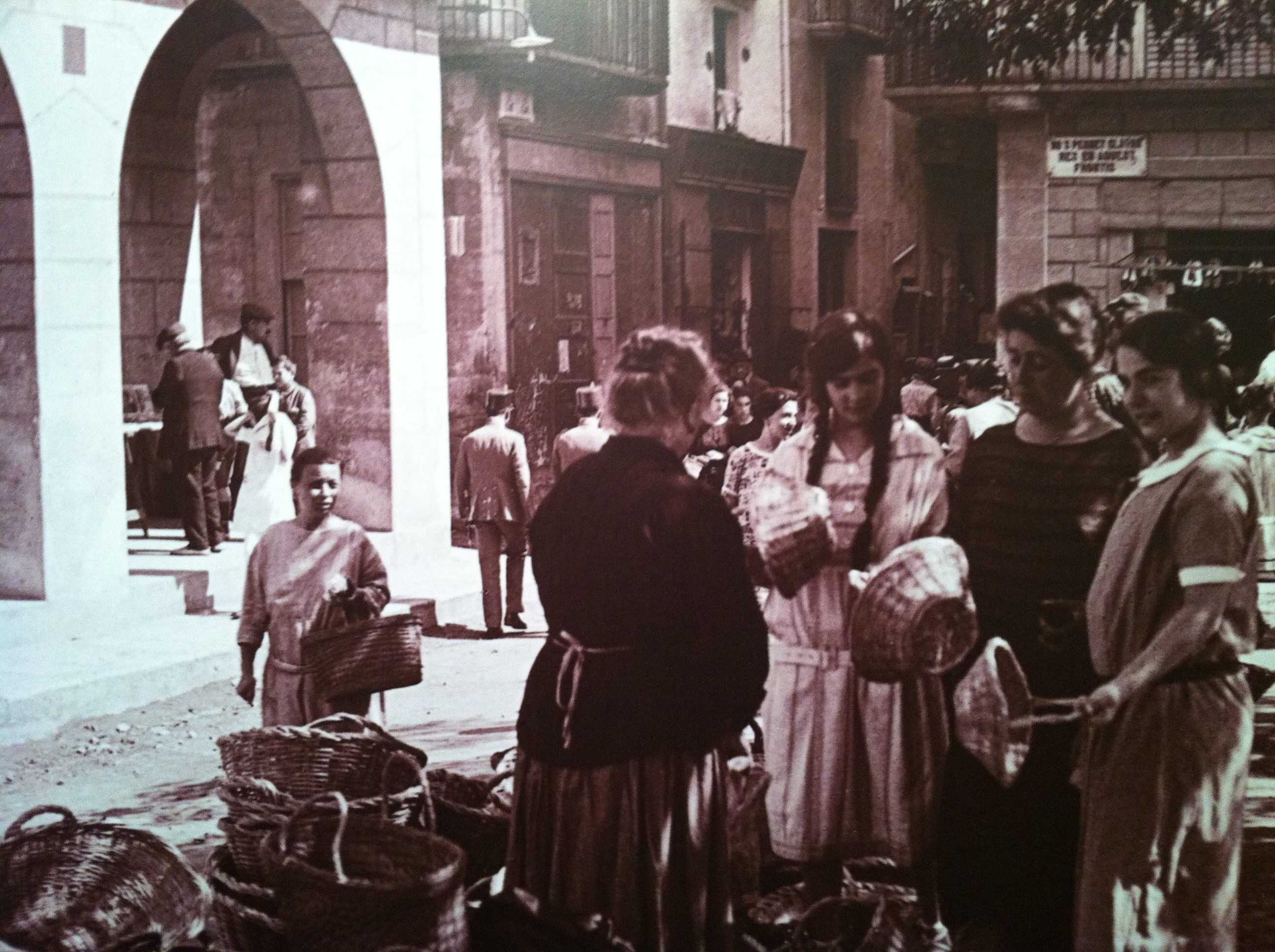
Women in the old market.

An Iberian settlement was already present in the 5th century BC in the hill where the Salvament lies today. From the 1st century BC onwards, the population started moving to the plains surrounding the Riera de les Comes, where, in the Middle Ages, the Monestir de Sant Feliu de Guíxols was built. The settlement grew, and soon dwellings started to spring up on the other side of the watercourse, which would become the nucleus of the medieval town, centered on the market.

Between 1892 and 1969, the town was connected to the city of Girona by the narrow gauge Sant Feliu de Guíxols–Girona railway. The line has since been converted into a greenway.

== Monuments ==
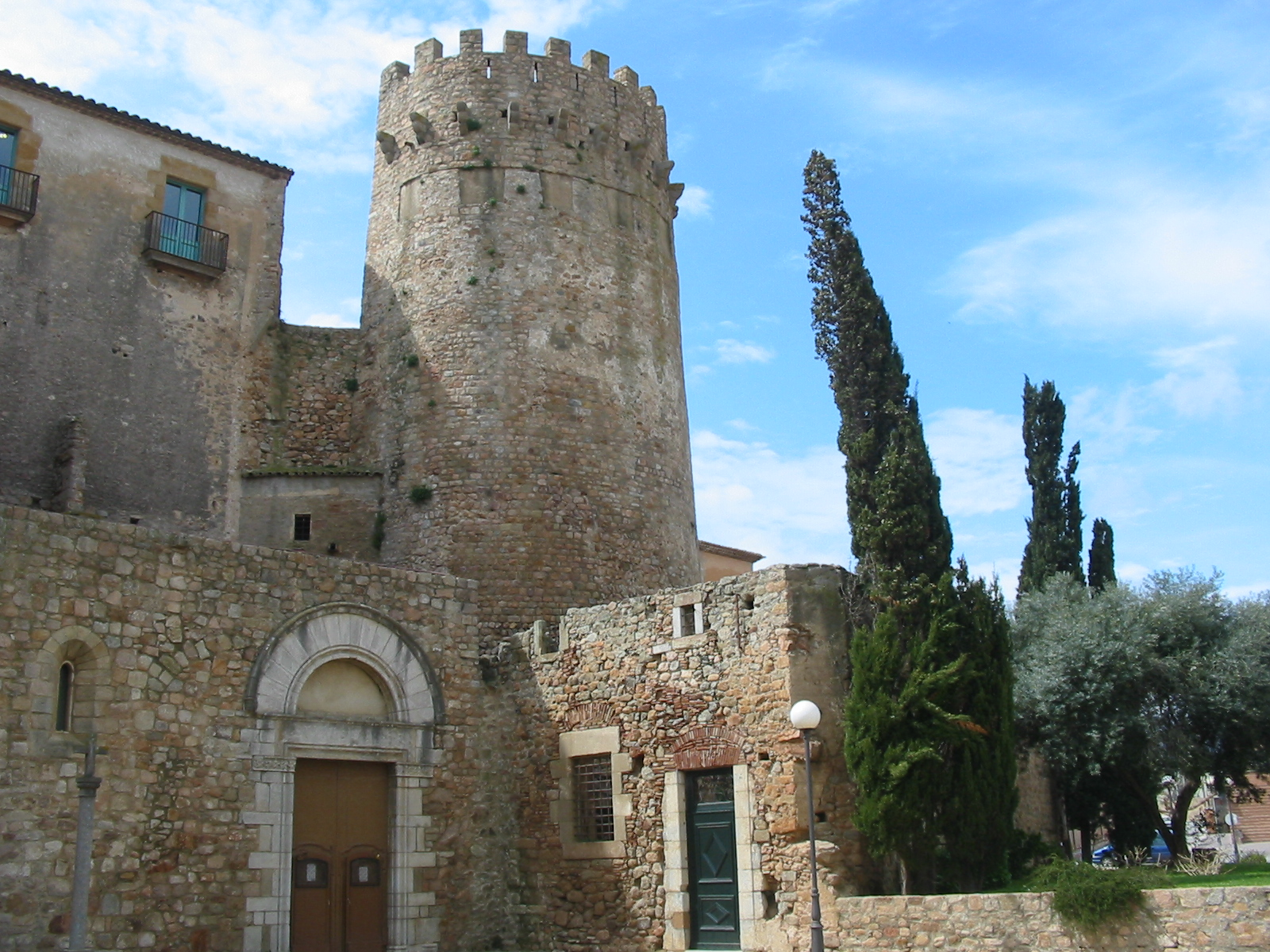
Sant Feliu de Guíxols Monastery

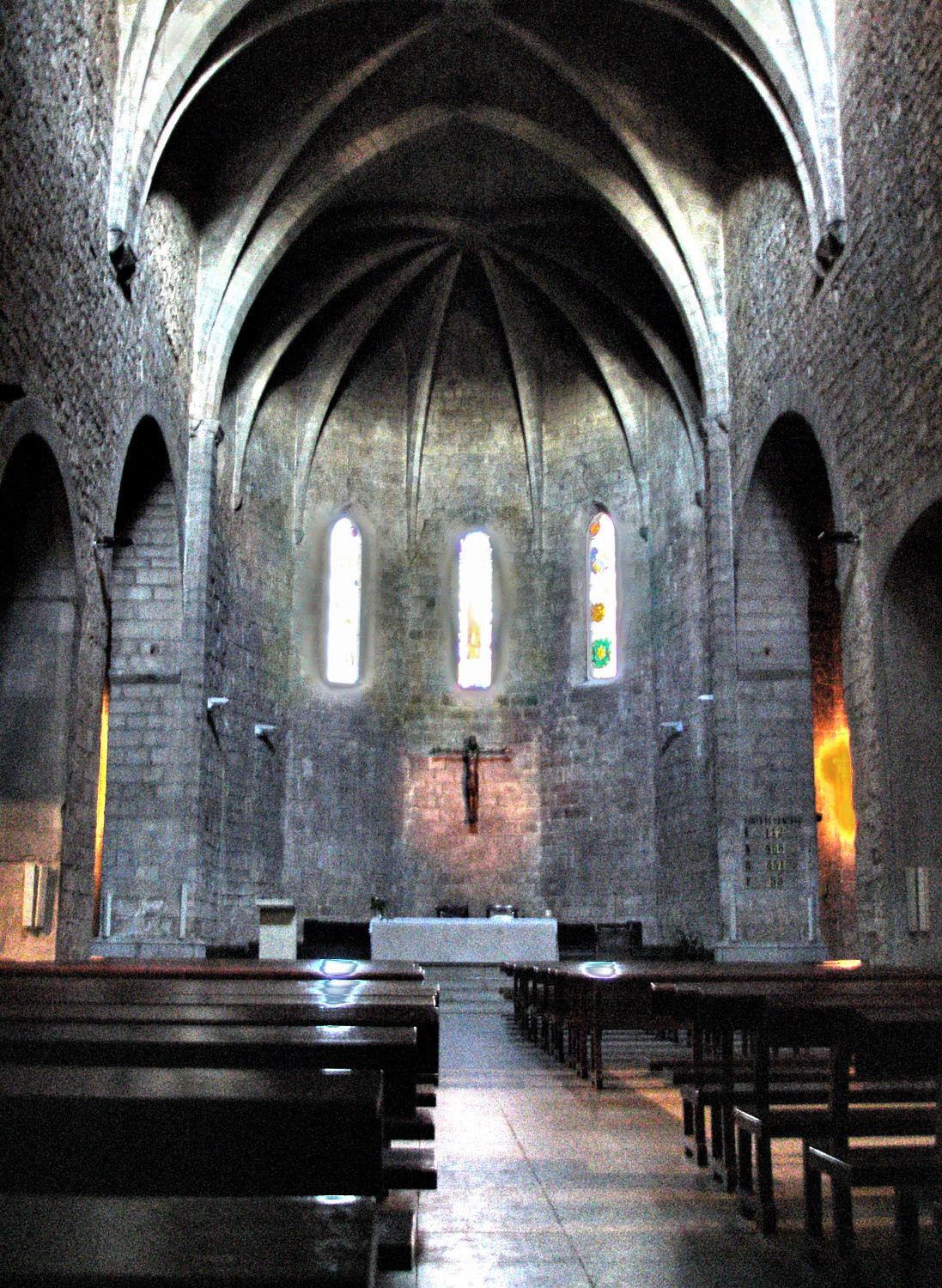
Inside Sant Feliu de Guíxols' monastery

- Monestir de Sant Feliu de Guíxols
- Plaça del Mercat. The market place serves as the heart of public and economic life in the town. A fruit and vegetable market takes place every morning on the “Plaça”. On Sundays, the weekly market takes place along the Passeig and on the Plaça, a popular meeting place for residents.
- Passeig dels Guíxols.
- Passeig del Mar. Opened in 1833, the seafront promenade was built between the medieval town and the sea. Little by little, the humble homes of fishermen from the medieval era were replaced by stately homes. Today, the area's architecture is mostly modern; because of real estate, many of the mansions are gone and condominiums have replaced them.
- Casino la Constància, constructed in 1888 by the architect General Guitart. It is also known as Casino dels nois.
- Pedralta, which used to be the largest rocking stone in Europe.
- Old railway station, designed by architects Rafael Coderch and Gabriel March and built between 1889 and 1892, which served the line from Sant Feliu de Guíxols to Girona. It was used until 1969, and now serves as a public school.
- Historic residences. From the mid- to late-19th century, Catalonia began to prosper economically and developed a bourgeoisie class. Sant Feliu de Guíxols has many examples of the elegant, bourgeoisie homes of this time period. Some examples are the casa Gaziel (1880), the casa Pecher (1894), the casa Maynegre (1898), the casa Girbau (1910), the casa Maruny (1909), the casa Ribot (1904), the casa de la Campana (1911), and the casa Patxot (1917).
- The town hall, somewhat Gothic in style, yet simple, was originally built in 1547. It has survived battles and real estate. However, today it has a tower added on from 1847.
- Hermitage of Sant Elm. This small hermitage was founded in 1203. The chapel was built in 1452, and dedicated to Saint Elm; however, it was destroyed by the French in 1696. It was rebuilt in 1723, only to be damaged in 1943, during the Spanish Civil War; the present chapel was restored in 1993. It sits on a cliff above the sea.
- El corsari, a bar built in a cave

== Events ==
Sant Feliu de Guíxols is located in an area known for its parties, festivals and especially its carnivals.

The Porta Ferrada International Festival, instituted in 1958, is celebrated in the town's port area. It involves theatre, music, and dance, and is usually celebrated in the summer.

The Festa Major is a traditional, Catalan festival, celebrated on 1 August. It is dedicated to the town's patron saint, St. Feliu, and includes a large fireworks display that takes place on the beach.

== Twin cities ==
Sant Feliu de Guíxols is twinned with:

- Schwaz, Austria
- Bourg-de-Péage, France
- Mindelheim, Germany, since 1994
- Verbania, Italy, since 1994
- East Grinstead, England

== Notable people ==
- Ester Xargay Melero (1960-2024), poet, video artist, translator and cultural agitator
