= Convento de Santa Fé =

Former monastery in Toledo, Spain

Coordinates: 39.8601°N 4.0208°W

Convent of Santa Fe
- Convento de Santa Fe (Spanish)
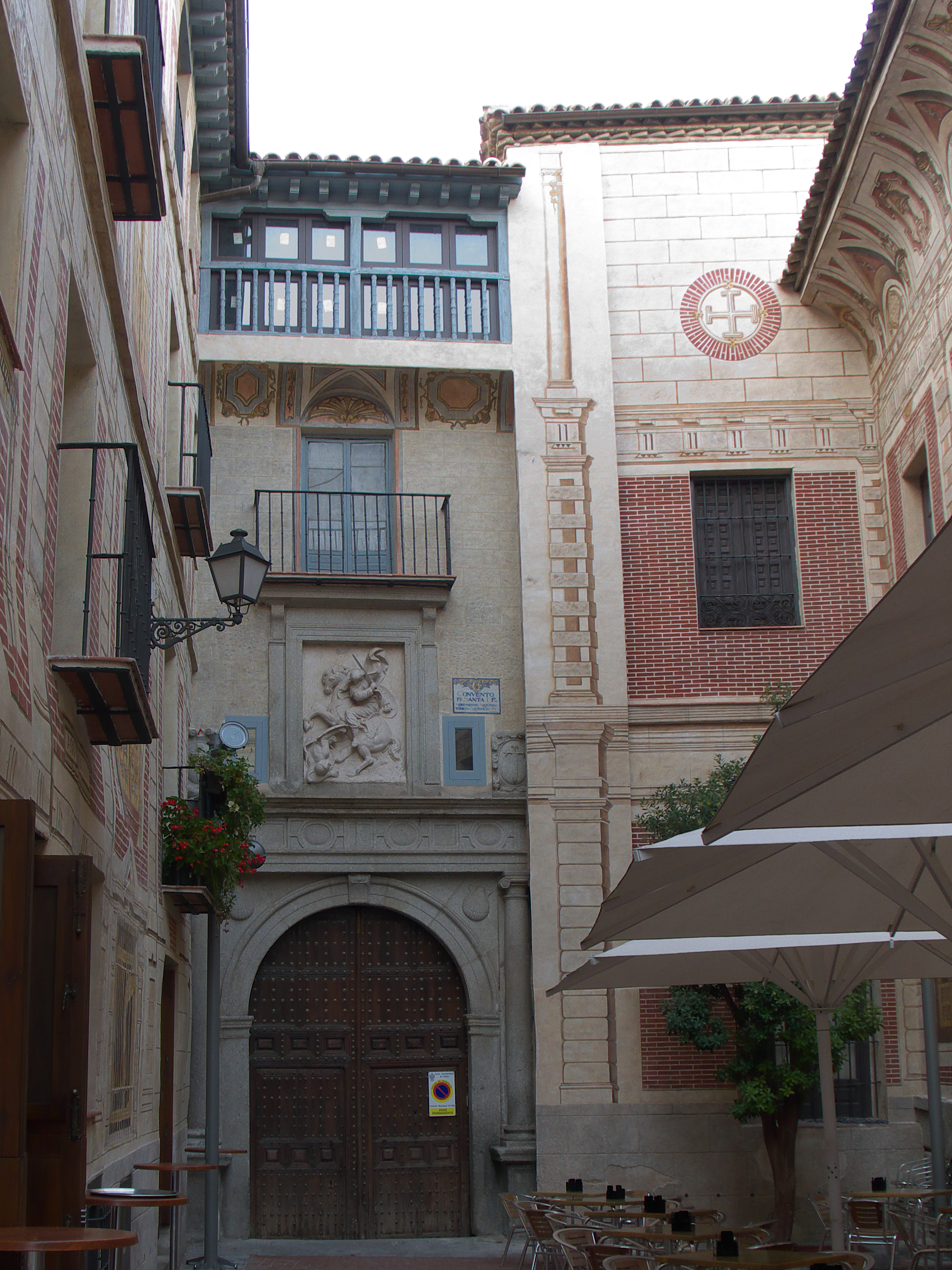

Religion
- Affiliation: Catholicism
- Province: Toledo
- Region: Castile-La Mancha

Location
- Location: Toledo, Spain
- Interactive map of Convent of Santa Fe

Convent of Santa Fe (Spanish: Convento de Santa Fe) is a former monastery situated in Toledo, Spain. It is situated in the north-east of the historic centre of the city. Included in the heritage listing Bien de Interés Cultural, it has been protected since 30 September 1919.

It is built on ancient Muslim ruins.

== See also ==
- High medieval domes

== Bibliography ==
- Barreda Fontes, José; Valverde Serrano, José (22 May 2001). Decreto 143/2001, de 15/05/2001, Consejo de Gobierno, por el que se delimita el entorno protegible del Bien de Interés Cultural denominado Hospital de Santa Cruz y Convento de Santa Fe, localizado en Toledo. pp. 6122–6123.
- Bendala Galán, Manuel (2003). Manual del arte español. Sílex ediciones. ISBN 9788477370994.
- Calvo Capilla, Susana (2002). La Capilla de Belén del Convento de Santa Fe de Toledo: ¿Un oratorio musulmán?, mit 8 Textabbildungen und Tafel 50-53. Madrider Mitteilungen. pp. 353–375. ISSN 0418-9744.
- Martín, Concepción; Monzón Moya, Fabiola (2006). "El antiguo convento de Santa Fe de Toledo: recuperación de algunas dependencias de época musulmana" (PDF). Bienes culturales: Revista del Instituto del Patrimonio Histórico Español (6): 53–76. ISSN 1695-9698.
- Prado Palacio, José del (8 October 1919). Gobierno de España (ed.). Real orden declarando Monumento arquitectónico-artístico el Monasterio de Comendadoras de Santiago, conocido con el nombre de Convento de Santa Fe, de la ciudad de Toledo (PDF). Gaceta de Madrid. p. 109.
