= High medieval domes =

Domes in religious architecture during the High Middle Ages

The domes of the High Middle Ages (c. 1000-1300) built by Arab Muslim and Western European Christian states were influenced by the East-West Schism, the Crusades, and the Reconquista. There are early examples of muqarnas elements supporting domes from the Fatimid Caliphate and the Abbasid Caliphate in the 11th century, as well as crossed-arch domes in the Taifas of al-Andalus. The domes of Norman Sicily blended Byzantine and Islamic elements. Christian domes under Byzantine influence used pendentives and were built over Greek-cross plans. Romanesque church domes, especially those of the Holy Roman Empire beginning around 1050, were generally octagonal on squinches and hidden externally within crossing towers.

Domes on pendentives appear in the Aquitaine region of France after the beginning of the Crusades in 1095, apparently based upon Byzantine models. Distinctive domes on pendentives were also built in Spain during the Reconquista, in addition to Christian crossed-arch domes similar to that of the earlier Great Mosque of Córdoba. A series of centrally planned churches were built by the Knights Templar throughout Europe, modeled on the Church of the Holy Sepulchre, with the Dome of the Rock at their Temple Mount headquarters also an influence.

Bulbous domes were used to cover large Islamic buildings in Syria after the eleventh century, following an architectural revival there, and the present shape of the Dome of the Rock's dome likely dates from this time. Islamic domes of the Ayyubid dynasty tended to be smooth and replaced the curved squinch forms of the Fatimids with more angular forms. Madrassas often included a domed mosque or mausoleum. The Mamluks built tombs with a variety of dome forms and developed transition zones that used corbelled layers of muqarnas and stalactite elements.

== Holy Roman Empire ==
In Italy, the frequency, quality, and scope of dome construction increased beginning in the 11th century (although not in the city of Rome) and they were used in baptisteries, princely chapels, cathedrals, bell towers, and pieve churches. Early examples include the baptistery of S. Ponzo Canavese (c. 1005), the baptistery of the Basilica di San Vincenzo in Galliano (1007), the Baptistery of Biella (c. 1040), and the baptistery of Novara Cathedral (1040). The Biella baptistery included a turret over the dome that was unconnected to the space below.

The 4th century structure at St. Gereon in Cologne influenced the Ottonian building at Deutz Abbey (1002-1019).

The Church of St. Peter and St. Paul of Ottmarsheim

Copies of the Palatine Chapel at Aachen include an octagonal church in Ottmarsheim (c. 1020), a chapel in Nijmegen (reconstructed in the 11th century), and the Westbau of Essen Minster (c. 1039-1058). The chapel of Saint Andrew in the Bamberg Imperial Palace of Henry II (c. 1020), may have been a copy of the Aachen chapel, but only 8.2 metres (27 ft) in diameter. It was destroyed in 1777.

== Kingdom of France ==
The rotunda of the Abbey of St. Bénigne in Dijon was built around the 11th century. Because of its dedication to "the Virgin and 'all the saints'" and its dome's central oculus, it is thought to be inspired by the Pantheon in Rome, which had been rededicated in 613 as the Church of Sancta Maria ad Martyres.

== Catalan counties ==
In Catalonia, there appears to have been a "dramatic increase in the quantity and quality of building in the first half of the eleventh century" and the construction of domes on squinches, rather than the pendentives on comparable buildings, may indicate the use of masons with experience building domes in Al-Andalus.

=== County of Barcelona ===
The so-called first Romanesque style of churches in the early 11th century included examples in Spain with domes on squinches. The domes tend to be dark and sometimes included small windows at the base. The church of Santa Maria de Ripoll was consecrated in 1032, but was rebuilt after a fire in 1835.

The church of Sant Vicenç in the Castle of Cardona has a dome on squinches. Sant Vicenç was built by 1040 and there is another example at Corbera. The Corbera church may not have been intended to have a dome when the foundations were laid and the crossing bay was narrowed to create a square by the insertion of additional arches on the north and south sides. The dome was covered by a square belfry on the exterior.

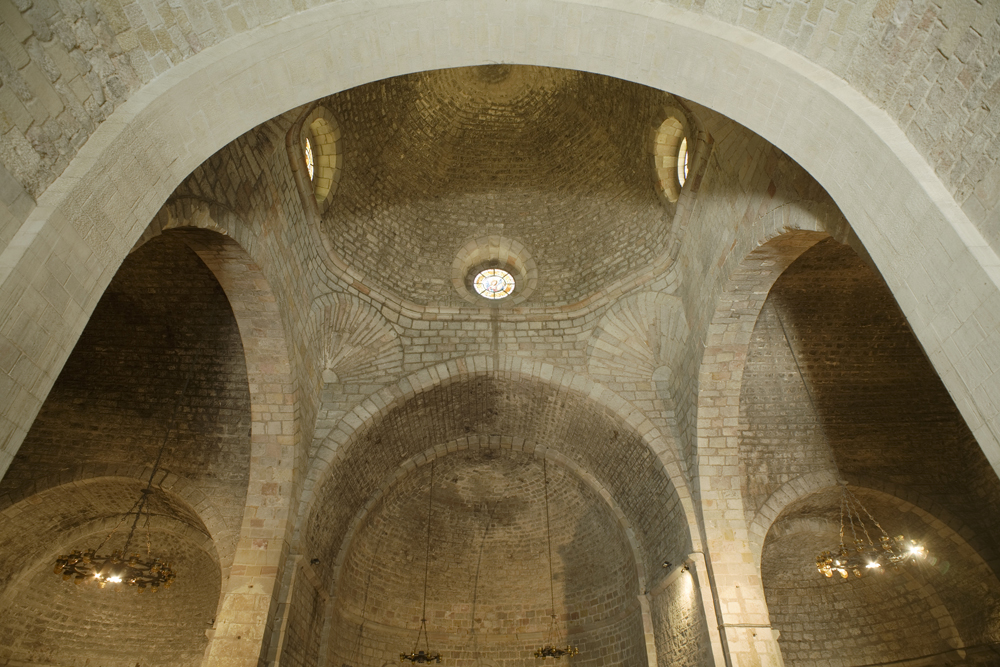
The church of San Pablo

The small church of San Pablo in Barcelona has a central dome and triapsal arrangement resembling the churches of eastern Christianity.

=== County of Empúries ===
The church of Sant Miquel in Cruïlles was consecrated in 1035 and has a dome at its crossing covered on the exterior by a drum and short square tower.

== Taifas of Al-Andalus ==
=== Taifa of Toledo ===
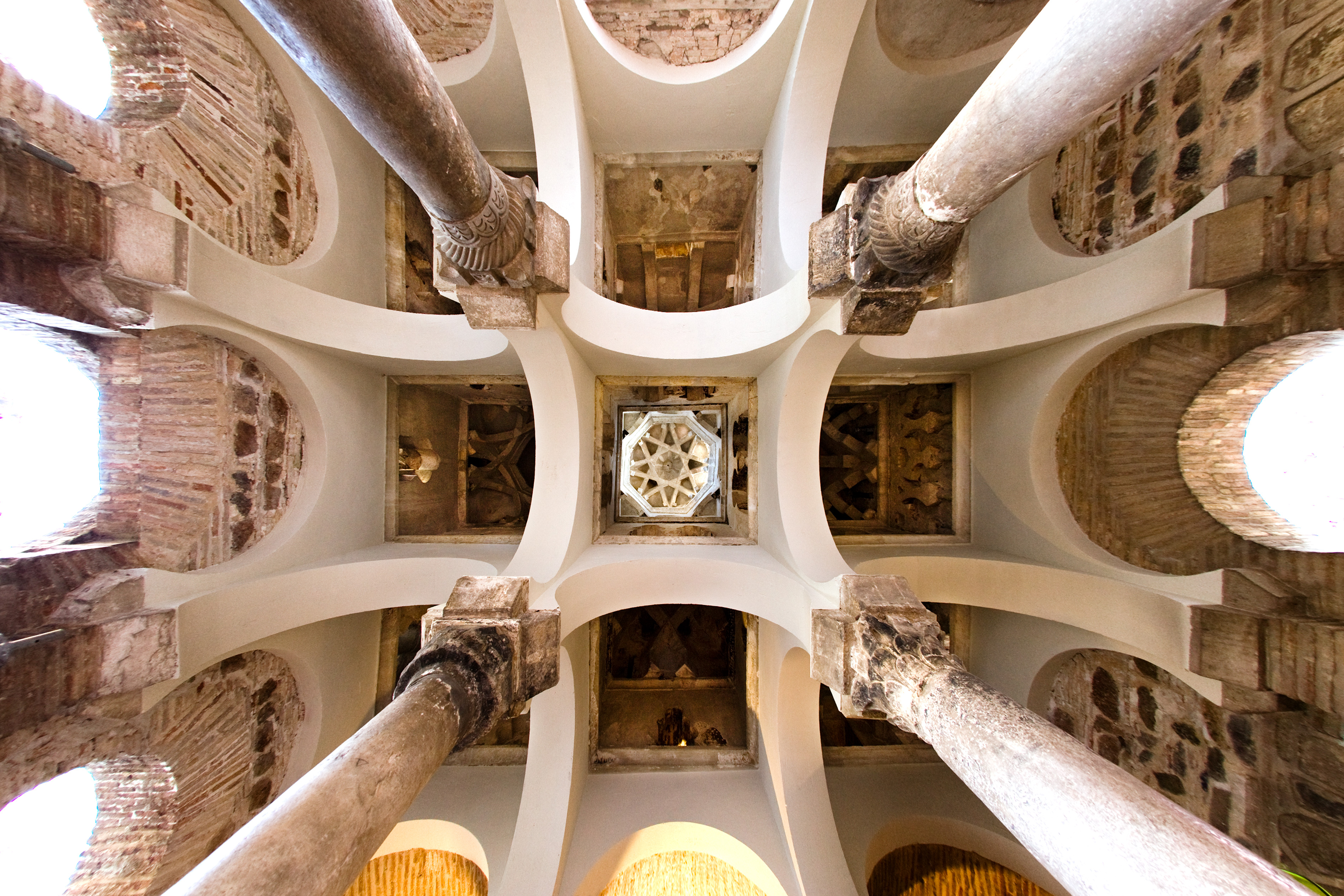
The Mosque of Cristo de la Luz

The nine bays of the Mosque of Cristo de la Luz, built about 50 years after the crossed-arch domes of the Great Mosque of Córdoba, contain a virtual catalog of crossed-arch dome variations.

The building now known as the Capilla de Belen in Santa Fe de Toledo has a crossed-arch dome that may date to the 11th century under the Banu Du-l-Nun sovereigns of Toledo. It has also been proposed as dating from the 13th or 14th centuries.

=== Taifa of Zaragoza ===
No other crossed-arch examples survive in Spain until the dome of the mosque of the Aljafería Palace, built for Ibn Jafar Al-Muqtadir, who reigned from 1049 to 1081.

== Republic of Ancona ==
The dome of the Church of Santa Maria in Portonovo may have been built between 1034 and 1050.

== Fatimid Caliphate ==
The local brick dome technique of Eqypt in the 11th century used a transitional zone with trefoil or pointed arch squinches.

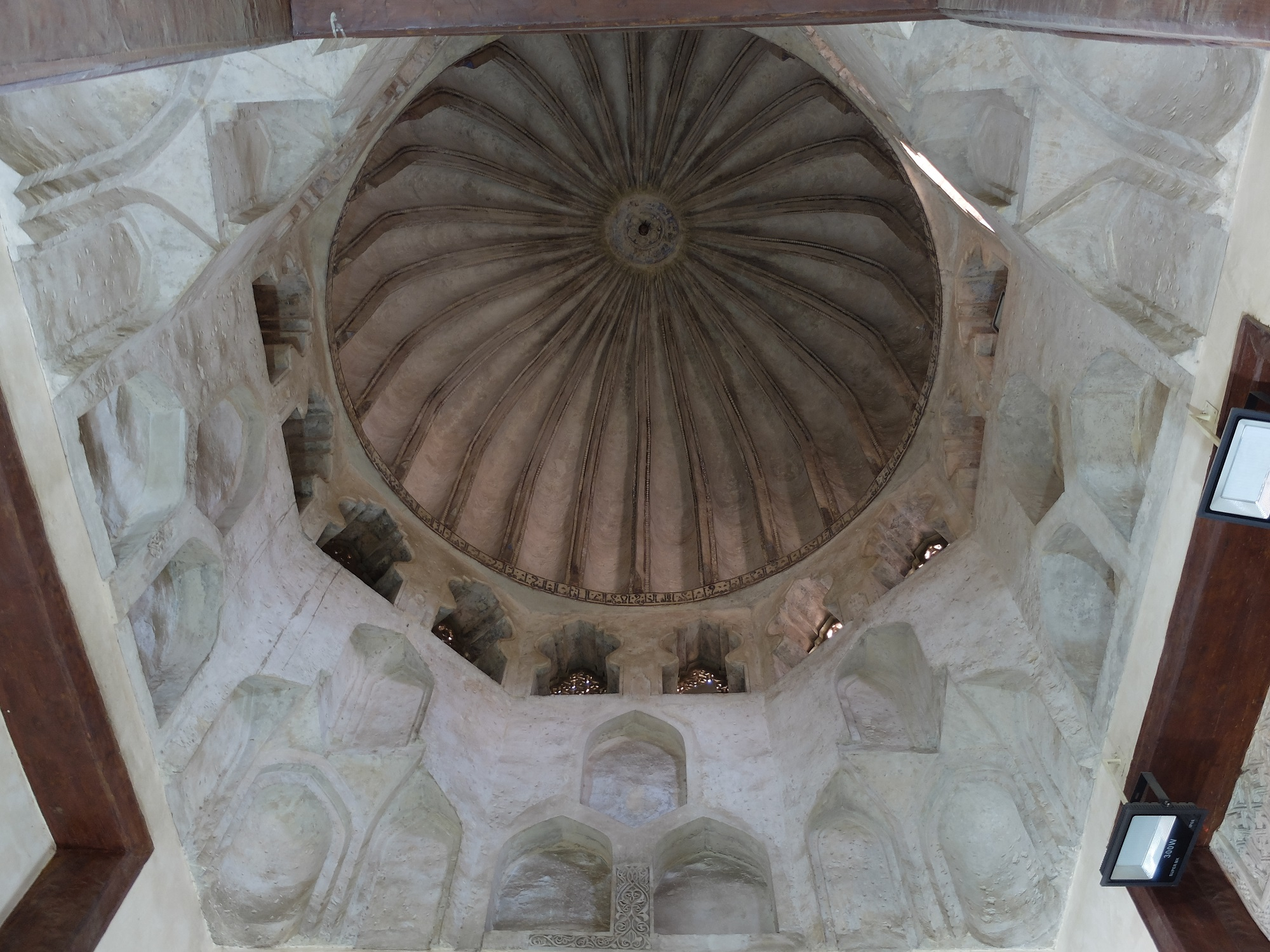
The Mashhad of Sayyida Ruqayya

There are 11 examples of domes with early brick muqarnas elements in their transition zones between 1050 and 1150, including a tomb at Aswān (c. 1050), Bāb Zuwayla (1092), the Tomb of Shaykh Yūnus (1094), the Coptic chapel of Abū al-Sayfayn (1094-1121), the Tomb of Sayyida ʿĀtika (1120-1125), the Tomb of Muḥammad al-Jaʿfarī (1120-1125), a tomb at Qūṣ (1120-1130), a tomb across from the Khānqāh Sulṭān Baybars al-Jāshnakīr (c. 1133), the Mashhad of Sayyida Ruqayya (1133), and the Mashhad Yaḥyā al-Shabīh (c. 1150). The domes are around 3 meters wide, but the largest diameter is the 7.58 meter dome of the Mashhad Yahyā al-Shabīh.

The tomb at Qūṣ used small trefoil arches in the upper level of the transition zone to create a sixteen-sided base for the dome.

Most of the domes have two layers of brick muqarnas forming a diagonal trefoil arch over the corners of a square bay, likely a development of the squinch arch, and this would continue until the 12th century. The walls between the arches mirrored the trefoil pattern, but with a single window until 1130. Then the single window transitioned to a three-window arrangement with one window over two others, as seen in the Mashhad of Sayyida Ruqayya and the Mashhad Yaḥyā al-Shabīh.

== East–West Schism ==
The schism between the churches of Constantinople and Rome was reflected in architecture. The Greek cross and domes of Byzantine architecture were found in areas of Byzantine cultural influence. An example is the domed Greek cross church in Genga, an area of indirect eastern influence. At the Church of San Salvatore in Barzanò, a third phase of construction added a hemispherical dome on squinches over the existing central bay of the building, possibly in the late 11th century.

Octagonal cloister vaults appear "in connection with basilicas almost throughout Europe" between 1050 and 1100. The precise form differs from region to region. They were popular in medieval Italy, in brick. Romanesque domes were typically octagonal in plan and used corner squinches to translate a square bay into a suitable octagonal base. The domes at the intersection of a church's nave and transept were generally found within crossing towers, which concealed the domes externally. Called a tiburio, this tower-like structure often had a blind arcade near the roof. Romanesque basilicas with crossing domes were widespread in Italy. They were built across southern Europe in the 11th and 12th centuries and hundreds of examples under church crossing towers exist in Spain and southern France.

The use of domes declined in Western Europe with the rise of Gothic architecture. Gothic domes were uncommon due to the use of rib vaults over naves, and with church crossings usually focused instead by tall steeples, but there are examples of small octagonal crossing domes in cathedrals as the style developed from the Romanesque. The domes of Romanesque and Early Gothic Latin-cross churches rarely span more than the width of the nave. Spaces of circular or octagonal plan were sometimes covered with vaults of a "double chevet" style, similar to the chevet apse vaulting in Gothic cathedrals.

=== Holy Roman Empire ===
The Chapel of our Lady at the Imperial Palace of Goslar (begun around 1060) has since been destroyed, but had two concentric octagonal walls and was said to have been modeled on the Aachen church.

The architecture of the areas of northern Italy that were a part of the Holy Roman Empire developed differently from the rest of the Italian peninsula. The earliest use of the octagonal cloister vault within an external housing at the crossing of a cruciform church may be at Acqui Cathedral in Acqui Terme, Italy, which was completed in 1067. This became increasingly popular as a Romanesque feature over the course of the next fifty years. The first Lombard church to have a lantern tower, concealing an octagonal cloister vault, was San Nazaro in Milan, just after 1075. Many other churches followed suit in the late 11th and early 12th centuries, such as the Basilica of San Michele Maggiore in Pavia (the coronation church of the Kingdom of Italy within the Holy Roman Empire) and the Basilica of Sant'Ambrogio in Milan. The Monastery of Capo di Ponte has a crossing dome that dates from about 1090. At Sant'Ambrogio, the original plan for the church did not include a domed crossing and it was modified to include one, as also happened at Pisa Cathedral (funding for which was provided by Emperor Henry IV in 1089 and Emperor Henry V in 1116) and Speyer Cathedral (the burial church of the Salian dynasty of Holy Roman Emperors). The crossing domes at Pavia, Pisa, and Speyer were all completed around 1080 but the exact order of precedence is unresolved.

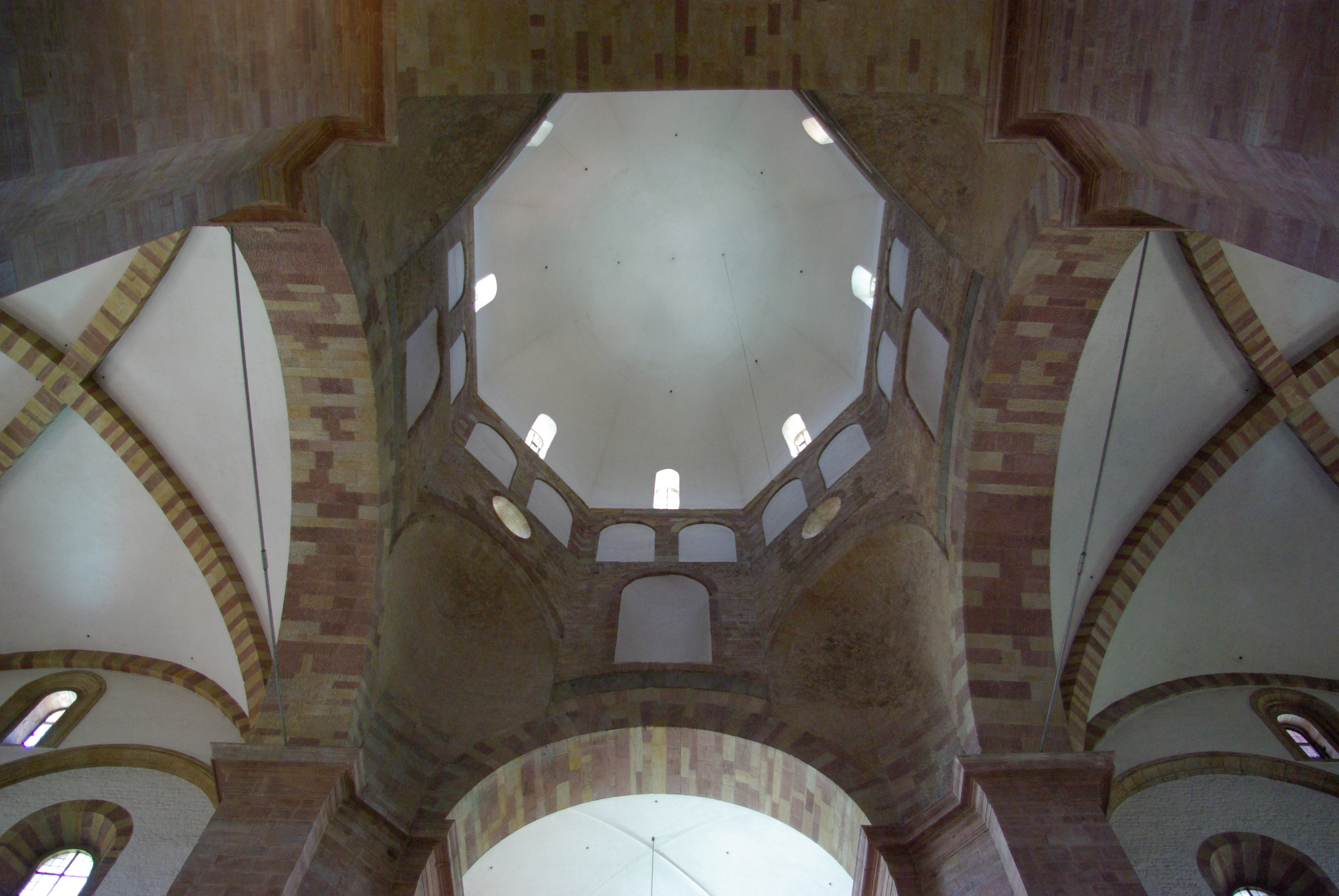
Speyer Cathedral in Germany

The renovation of Speyer Cathedral, the largest of the Imperial Cathedrals of the Holy Roman Empire, was begun around 1080 by the Emperor Henry IV, soon after he had returned from a trip to Canossa in northern Italy. Although the church had only just been consecrated in 1061, Henry called upon craftsmen from across the empire for its renovation. The redesign included two octagonal cloister vaults within crossing towers, one at the east crossing with an external dwarf gallery and one at the west end. This was very soon imitated elsewhere and became the model for later Rhenish octagonal domes, such as those of Worms Cathedral (c. 1120–1181) and Mainz Cathedral (c. 1081–1239). Many German Imperial cathedrals feature domes at their crossings.

The domes of Pisa Cathedral and Florence Baptistery may be two of the earliest domes in Tuscany and were the two largest until about 1150. The smaller dome of the Abbey of Coneo may have been built in the early 12th century.

Pisa Cathedral, built between 1063 and 1118, includes a high elliptical dome at the crossing of its nave and transept. The marble dome was one of the first in Romanesque architecture and is considered the masterpiece of Romanesque domes. Rising 48 meters above a rectangular bay, the shape of the dome was unique at the time. The rectangular bay's dimensions are 18 meters by 13.5 meters. Squinches were used at the corners to create an elongated octagon in a system similar to that of the contemporary Basilica of San Lorenzo in Milan and corbelling was used to create an oval base for the dome. The tambour on which the dome rests dates to between 1090 and 1100, and it is likely that the dome itself was built at that time. There is evidence that the builders did not originally plan for the dome and decided on the novel shape to accommodate the rectangular crossing bay, which would have made an octagonal cloister vault very difficult. Additionally, the dome may have originally been covered by an octagonal lantern tower that was removed in the 1300s, exposing the dome, to reduce weight on foundations not designed to support it. This would have been done no later than 1383, when the Gothic loggetta on the exterior of the dome was added, along with the buttressing arches on which it rests.

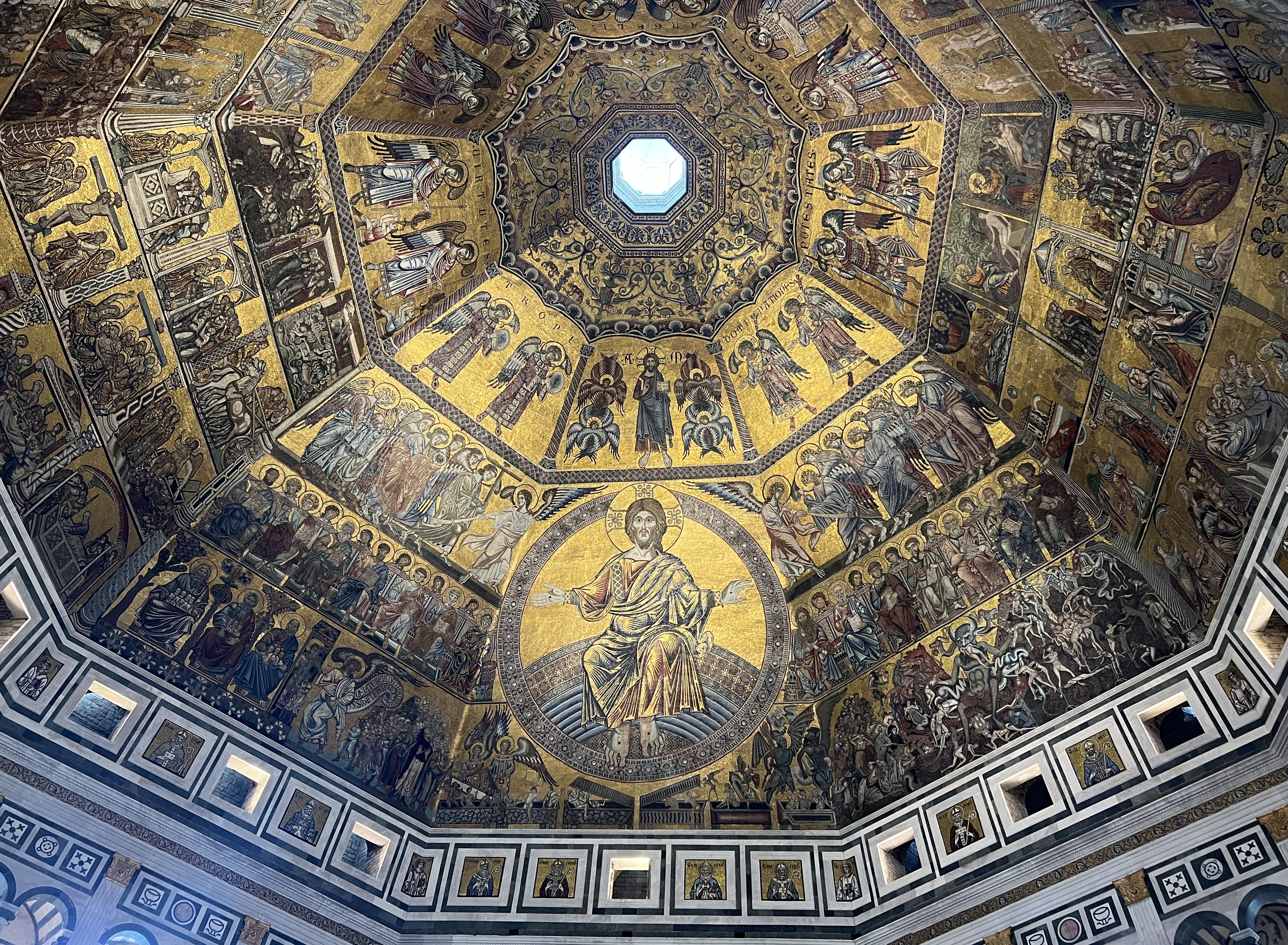
Florence Baptistery in Italy

An aspiring competitor to Pisa, the city of Florence took the opposite side in the conflict between Pope and Emperor, siding with the Pope in Rome. This was reflected architecturally in the "proto-renaissance" style of its buildings. The eight-sided Florence Baptistery, with its large octagonal cloister vault beneath a pyramidal roof, was likely built between 1059 and 1128, with the dome and attic built between 1090 and 1128. The lantern above the dome is dated to 1150. The octagonal oculus, or opaion, seems to have been open to the sky until the lantern was built, likely with a covering that could be used in bad weather, given the lack of a drainage system within the building. The lantern was commissioned by the Calimala Guild. Although there are earlier examples of turrets on domes, such as those on the baptisteries of Biella and Lomello, the structure over the dome of Florence Baptistery appears to be the first with a connection to the space below. It was dismantled and rebuilt with the original elements in 1896 in order to stabilize it.

The first documented mention of the baptistery was in 897 and the dating of the dome has been controversial, ranging from the sixth to the 13th centuries, although the building is believed to have undergone various transformations throughout the Middle Ages. Radiocarbon testing on chestnut tie beams have dated those elements to the 11th and first half of the 12th century, possibly corresponding to restorations by Pope Nicholas II, who reconsecrated the building in 1059, and dendrochronological analysis on a silver fir tie beam dated it to 1268, likely a replacement made when the dome mosaic was completed between 1270 and 1300. The 1059 consecration may have just been for the foundation stone of the new building project.

The dome is 25.6 meters in diameter. That Nicholas II was both the bishop of Florence and Pope from 1058 to 1061 may explain the large scale of the building. The lower half of the dome is made of ashlar stone, with the lowest levels in corbelled horizontal layers. After the outer vertical walls end, the inner dome transitions to brick, mostly recycled, in inclined layers. It takes inspiration from the Pantheon in Rome for its oculus and much of its interior decoration, although the pointed dome is structurally similar to Lombard domes, such as that of the later Cremona Baptistery. Its ratio of wall thickness to external diameter is about 1/10, in accordance with the rules of dome proportion followed until the 17th century. One of the most important religious buildings in Florence, the proportions of its dome were followed by the nearby dome of the Cathedral of Santa Maria del Fiore that was built by Brunelleschi centuries later. The polygonal dome was built with a wooden tension ring at about 23 meters high, too high to counteract the spreading forces, and a lower iron ring was added in 1514.

Smaller domed centralized buildings from this time include those of S. Fermo di Sopra (c. 1125), the Church of Santa Maria in Solario (c. 1130), the Baptistery of Riez, and the Baptistery of San Giovanni Battista in Agrate Conturbia (c. 1135).

The crossing dome at the Church of St. Trophime in Arles is beneath a large square tower. The Abbey church of Saint-Chef has a chapel in its tower covered by a rectangular cloister vault about 6 meters by 4.5 meters. Its frescoed ceiling is from the mid 11th to mid 12th century.

=== Kingdom of France ===
In southern Burgundy, domed crossings under towers were built at a village church in Bray, the Church of Saint-Sulpice at Laizé, and the Church of Saint-Martin at Chapaize. The domes were supported by corner squinches and corbel tables.

The rectangular church of Neuvy-Saint-Sépulchre, built in 1045 after a pilgrimage to Jerusalem by the lord of Déols, had a domed rotunda added afterward. Construction continued until the early 13th century. The domed rotundas of Saint-Léonard-de-Noblat (last third of the 11th century), Dijon Cathedral, and Charroux Abbey were likewise built or planned prior to the First Crusade.

The square domical vault over the chapel of Saint Michel d'Aiguilhe was frescoed around 1100 with the image of Christ off-center to allow visibility from the entrance.

The earliest existing large French dome is believed to be the pendentive dome built by 1075 over the crossing of the Collegiate Church of St-Martin at Angers. It reportedly incorporates "pottery" in its structure, a technique used in the late Roman period. The earliest example of a church with a transept in the Aquitaine region of France is the Church of Saint-Martin de Layrac (1063–1102), with a dome at the crossing.

The 11th- and 12th-century Cathedral of Le Puy uses an unusual row of six octagonal domes on squinches over its nave, with the domes at the western end being built at least a century later. A seventh dome is located in the normal position for a Romanesque dome on squinches: over the crossing. Other examples of this use over naves are rare and scattered. One is the large church of Saint Hilaire at Poitiers, which seems to have been influenced by Le Puy Cathedral. Its wide nave was narrowed with additional piers to form suitable square bays, which were vaulted with octagonal domes whose corner sides over trumpet squinches were so narrow that the domes resemble square cloister vaults with beveled corners. However, the nave domes of these churches are mostly inventions of 19th-century restorers. In particular, the two easternmost nave domes of Le Puy and the nave domes of St. Hilaire are from the 19th century, replacing original barrel vaults.

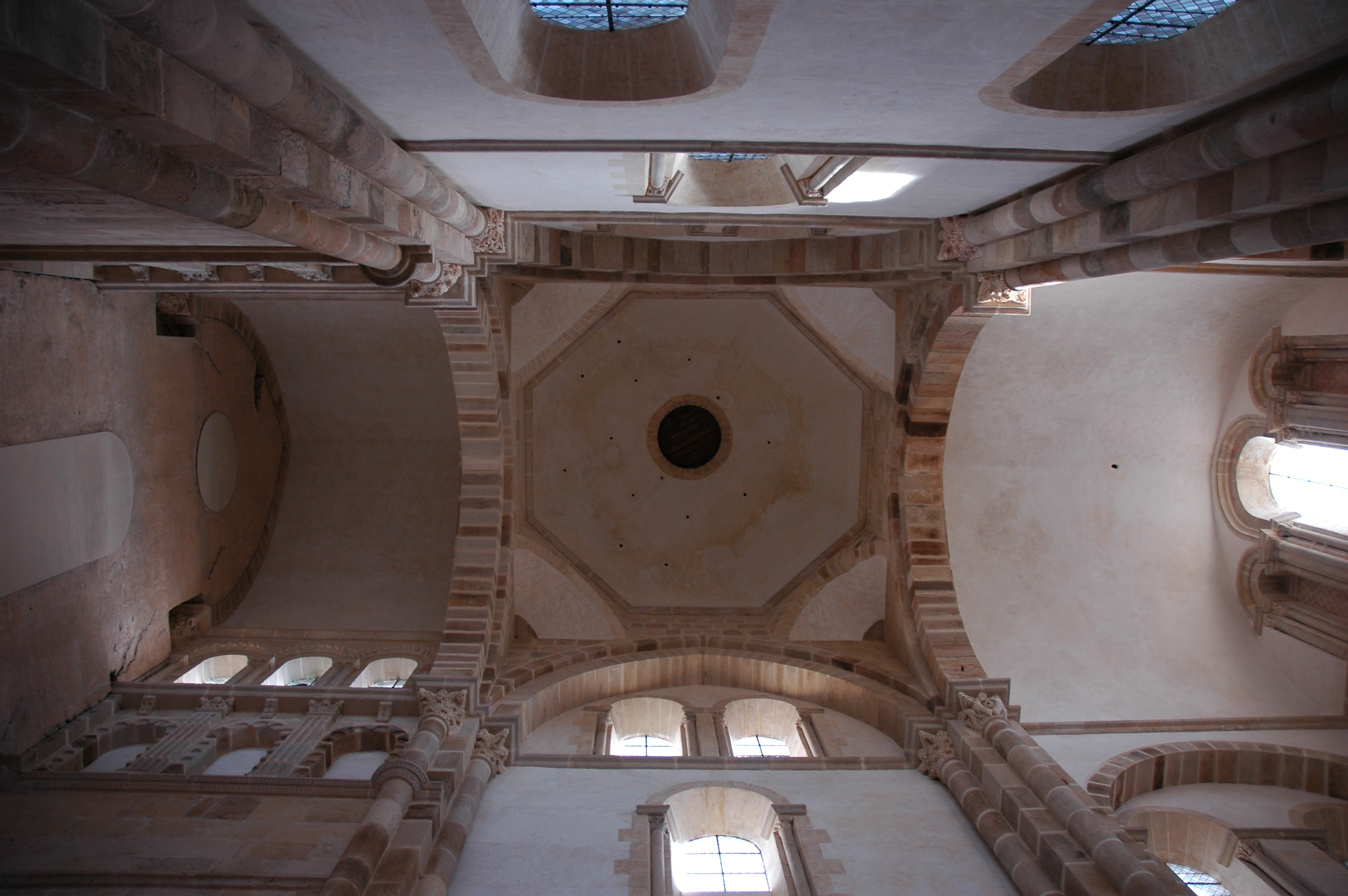
The surviving southern transept arm of Cluny Abbey

The crossing dome on squinches at the abbey church of Tournus may date to the 11th century. The Basilica of Saint-Martin d'Ainay has similar features. The largest church in France was Cluny Abbey, but it has been destroyed. The version of Cluny Abbey built under Abbot Hugo, dubbed "Cluny III", included octagonal domes closely related to the earlier examples at Speyer Cathedral. The surviving transept arm of Cluny Abbey, built in the early 12th century, has an octagonal dome on trumpet squinches beneath an octagonal tower and spire and flanked on either side by barrel vaults. Autun Cathedral has a similar nave arrangement to that of Cluny Abbey.

In Auvergne, there are several Romanesque churches with domed crossings that use squinches, with the dome supported by "flying screen" walls at the crossing bay and hidden on the exterior beneath octagonal towers with buttressing "shoulders" on two sides. Examples include the church of St. Saturnin and the Sainte-Marie de Cruas Abbey, which has a rotunda over the domed crossing. At Avignon Cathedral, probably from the middle of the 12th century, the rectangular crossing bay is narrowed to a square by means of two sets of four arches on opposite sides for the dome on squinches.

=== Kingdom of Hungary ===
The 11th century brick rotunda of the church of Karcsa was originally free-standing and consisted of an inner lobed hexagon plan with a central dome over a hexagonal drum. It's outer circular wall is 7.8 meters in diameter. Additions were made to the rotunda by the Knights of St. John in the 12th century. Two other brick lobed hexagon plans almost identical in size are a church of Gerény and a church in Kiszombor. At Gerény, the dome was destroyed and replaced after the Tatar invasion of 1241-1242. Although there are more than sixty centralized Romanesque churches in Hungary, they were usually stone buildings until the 13th century.

=== Republic of Venice ===
The Veneto region was strongly influenced by the architecture of Constantinople in the 11th century. On the island of Torcello, the Greek cross octagon style was used in the plan of the church of Santa Fosca.

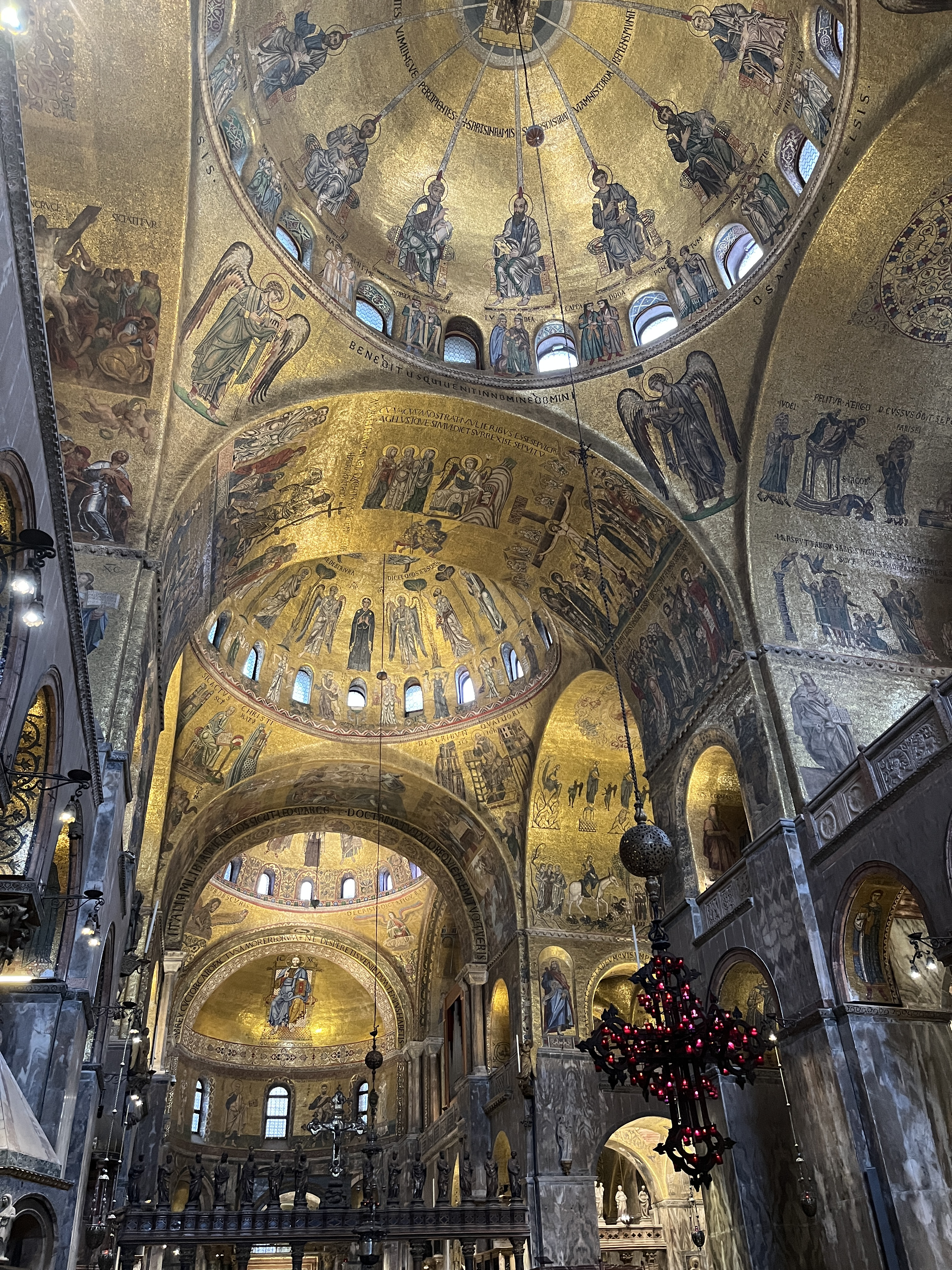
St. Mark's Basilica in Venice

The second and current St. Mark's Basilica in Venice was built on the site of the first between 1063 and 1072, replacing the earlier church while replicating its Greek cross plan. Five domes vault the interior (one each over the four arms of the cross and one in the center). These domes were built in the Byzantine style, in imitation of the now lost Church of the Holy Apostles in Constantinople. Mounted over pendentives, each dome has a ring of windows at its base. These five windowed domes reflect the addition of windows (within tall drums) in the remodeled Byzantine original. However, the tall outer shells at St. Mark's were not added until after 1204. The mosaic on the east dome has a discontinuity indicating damage and repair to the dome, possibly in the 12th century.

The later high wooden outer domes with lead roofing and cupolas were added to St. Mark's Basilica between 1210 and 1270, allowing the church to be seen from a great distance. In addition to allowing for a more imposing exterior, building two distinct shells in a dome improved weather protection. It was a rare practice before the 11th century. The original timber outer domes were destroyed in a fire in the early fifteenth century. The fluted and onion-shaped cupolas of the domes may have been added in the mid-fifteenth century to complement the ogee arches added to the facade in the late Gothic period. Their shape may have been influenced by the open and domed wooden pavilions of Persia or by other eastern models. Initially, only the center dome had one. Iron chains to resist lateral movement would be added later.

Several cross-domed churches were built in Venice during the Middle Ages, but only one has survived. San Giacomo di Rialto may have been first built in the 9th century and renovated in the 1097 revival of the Rialto market. It was rebuilt and consecrated in 1197.

Venice's Church of Santi Giovanni e Paolo was built between 1333 and 1430 and features a domed crossing with Byzantine and Romanesque influences, such as the domed Romanesque cathedrals of the northern plain.

=== Duchy of Apulia and Calabria ===
In southern Italy, the Basilica of San Sabino in Canosa di Puglia was built around 1080 with five domes over its "T-shaped layout", with three domes across the transept and another two out over the nave. Its cruciform plan, use of domes, and the later addition of an external mausoleum suggest that it may have been a Norman analog to the Byzantine Church of the Holy Apostles. It appears to have inspired a series of churches in Apulia with domed naves. The date of construction has been challenged as being decades too late. The multi-domed churches of Cyprus have been proposed as the inspiration for the basilica's domes and for the three-domed naves of later churches in the region, which date mostly from the period of Norman rule, but this is also a topic of debate.

The Ognissanti of Valenzano was built with pendentive domes. The domes at Valenzano were covered by low pyramids that were rebuilt in the 1960s. The town of Balsignano has the ruin of a small domed church that reflects a mixture of eastern and western influences.

=== Crown of Aragon ===
The Romanesque domed church at the Castle of Loarre has been dated to the enlargement of the castle by King Sancho Ramírez between 1063 and 1094, likely in the early 1080s. The church forms part of these expanded defenses. Stylistically, the dome has been argued to support a 12th-century date. Restoration of the dome in 1941 revealed 12th-century alterations to the roofline of the church apse, a part of apparent repairs at that time. The dome rises 20 meters above the floor and is supported by an unusual set of double squinches.

== Abbasid Caliphate before the Crusades ==
There was a decline in architecture in Syria and the Jazira area after 750, when the Abbasid Caliphate moved its capital to Iraq, but a revival occurred in the late 11th century. Few buildings survive that were built before 1080.

The so-called shrine of Imam al-Dawr in the village of al-Dawr, Iraq, is the earliest known example of a muqarnas dome, although it is unlikely to have been the first of its type. The dome rests on an octagonal base created by four squinches over a square bay. Three levels of muqarnas rise over this and are capped by a small cupola. The muqarnas cells are very large and resemble small squinches themselves. It was finished by 1090 by the court of an Uqaylid vassal of the Abbasid Caliphate of Baghdad and, although there are no surviving examples from Baghdad at this time, the large number of muqarnas domes known to have existed there by the end of the Middle Ages suggests that it could have been the source of the type.

In Syria, some early muqarnas domes exist of the Iraqi type, but more common were muqarnas vaulting as pendentives for slightly pointed hemispherical domes. Masonry and carved stone was used instead of the brick and plaster used in Iraq. These domes were alternatively supported by a double zone of squinches. Domes were used over single room structures as well as more complex assemblies, with the differences in building traditions and preferred materials in north and south Syria disappearing over time. Small domes were used over the platforms of minbars in Syria, Egypt, and by the Turks until the Ottoman change to polygonal cones, but were not used in Iran.

=== Hammadid dynasty ===
The palace at the Kalaa of the Beni Hammad contained a domed chamber.

== Kingdom of Sicily ==
The Christian domed basilicas built in Sicily after the Norman Conquest incorporate distinctly Islamic architectural elements. They include hemispherical domes positioned directly in front of apses, similar to the common positioning in mosques of domes directly in front of mihrabs, and the domes use four squinches for support, as do the domes of Islamic North Africa and Egypt. In other cases, domes exhibit Byzantine influences with tall drums, engaged columns, and blind arcades. Domes with visible extrados are similar to those on Fatamid mosques and blend Byzantine and Arab cultures.

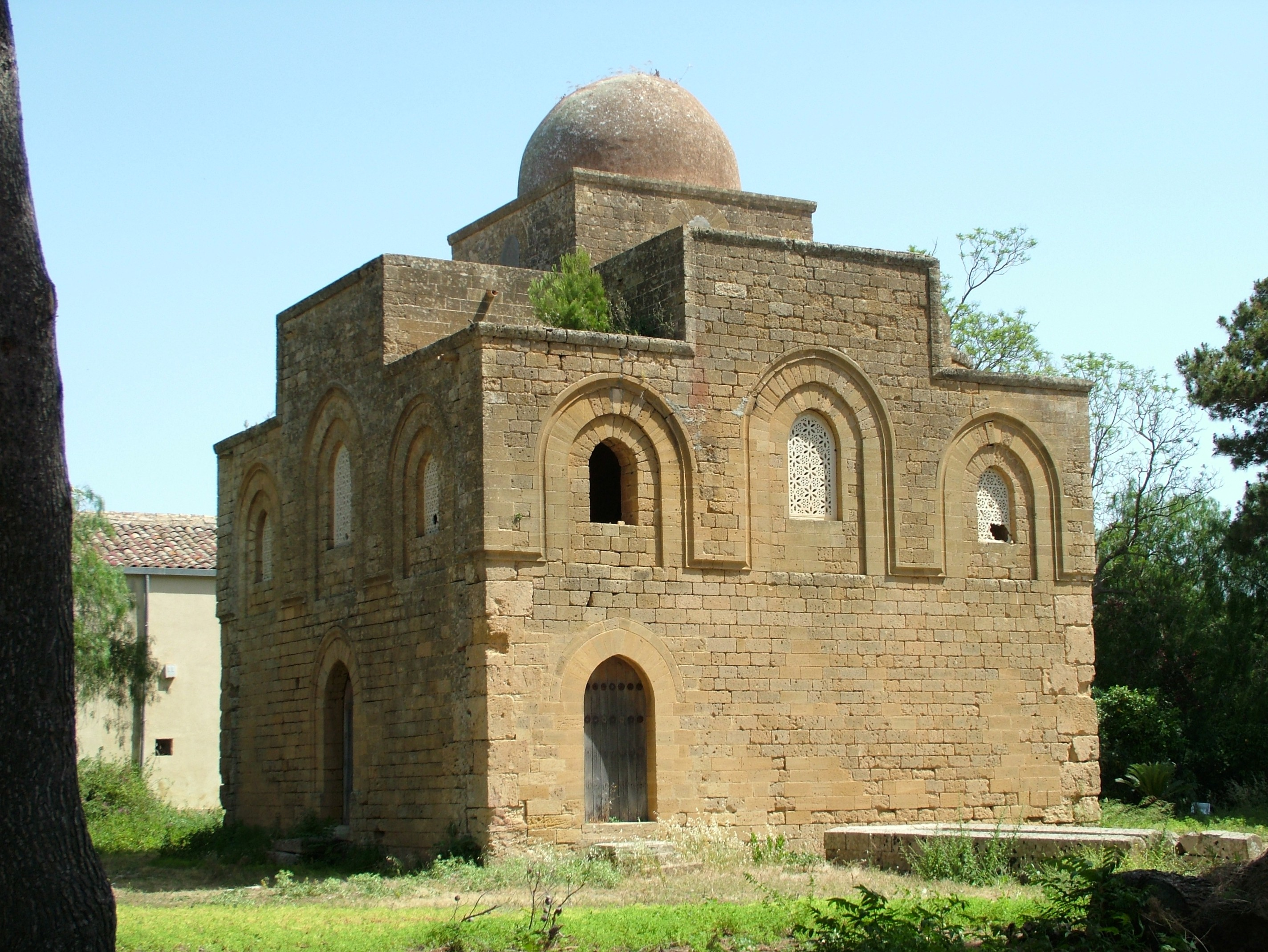
The Church of the Holy Trinity of Delia

The 11th century Church of the Holy Trinity of Delia has been described as an "Arabic interpretation of a typical Byzantine church" and used trumpet arches to support its dome. The Church of Santa Filomena in Santa Severina has a dome and drum resting on small pendentives right in front of the apse. The domed church of San Giovanni a Mare in Gaeta may have been built in the second half of the 11th century. The influence of the domed mosques of the Aghlabids has been cited to explain the design of the domes; representative examples of Islamic domes from North Africa can be seen in the Al-Hakim Mosque and the Great Mosque of Sousse.

Domes using squinches for support include the Church of Tre Santi (11th century) in San Fratello, The church of San Giovanni dei Lebbrosi (11th century) in Palermo, the church of San Giovanni degli Eremiti (12th century), and the Church of SS. Filippo and Giocomo (12th century) at Castello di Maredolce. The technique of semi-cylinder niches with piers protruding beyond the supporting wall was common in both Arab Sicily and the nearby areas of the Maghreb.

Domes were used in a variety of compositions and were often not the center or focus of the architecture. In the Val Demone region, the churches of Santa Maria in Mili (1090, but rebuilt in the 15th century), San Pietro in Itala (1092–1093, but rebuilt), and Santi Pietro and Paolo in Casalvecchio (1116, but rebuilt and restored in 1172) are well-preserved. The three domes on squinches of Santa Maria in Mili San Pietro, one of the first Norman buildings, are close together in a row above the prothesis, presbytery, and diaconicon, with the largest and tallest in the middle. The church of San Pietro in Itala has a central, tower-like dome. The church of Santi Pietro and Paolo in Casalvecchio has two domes, with a smaller eight-sided umbrella dome with muqarnas-like supports in the space before the altar and a larger umbrella dome on squinches over the nave. The dome over the nave has a circular base and the dome over the altar has an octagonal base.

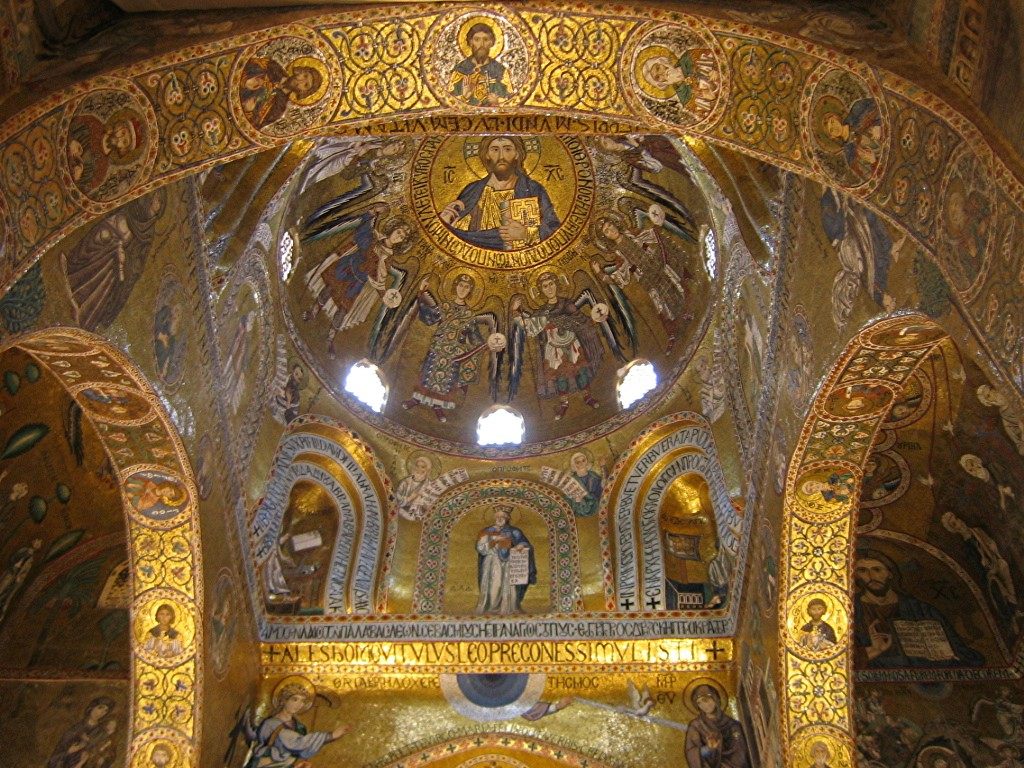
The Palatine Chapel

Examples at Palermo include the Palatine Chapel (1132–1143), La Martorana (c. 1140s), and Zisa, Palermo (12th century). The church of San Giovanni degli Eremiti has five domes in a T-shaped arrangement and the Church of San Cataldo has three domes on squinches, with both showing clearly Islamic influence. The Church of the Holy Trinity in Palermo (12th century) uses muqarnas to narrow the rectangular space above the altar to a square that then uses squinches to support a dome.

Along the Amalfi Coast, many domes are covered by glazed terracotta tiles in a fish scale arrangement, with the colors in geometric patterns indicating Islamic influence. The most popular colors are blue, green, yellow, and orange.

Private domes in the Amalfi region dating from the 13th century have been identified at Villa Rufolo and three villas in Scala: Villa South Toro, Villa Trara and Villa d'Afflitto. Although similar, they each have different proportions, surface finishes, materials, and colors. At Villa Rufolo, the dome in the entrance tower and the dome in the "Arabian Bath" have a fluting pattern of vertical grooves on the interior. The twisting of the grooves in the bath building dome may or may not be intentional. Uniquely at Villa South Toro, the dome is supported by spherical pendentives. Similar domes are found at the Cathedral of Casertavecchia, other Amalfi Coast churches, and in North Africa.

== Crusades and Reconquista ==
The Crusades, beginning in 1095, appear to have influenced domed architecture in Western Europe, particularly in the areas around the Mediterranean Sea. The crusaders also built several churches in Jerusalem during the 12th century. The most complete is the Church of Saint Anne, which has a small crossing dome.

=== Duchy of Apulia and Calabria ===
The Mausoleum of Bohemond (c. 1111–18), a Norman leader of the First Crusade, was built next to the Basilica of San Sabino in the southern Italian province of Apulia and has a hemispherical dome in a Byzantine style over a square building with a Greek cross plan. The dome had been covered by a pyramidal roof, according to a 1780s engraving, and the portion above the octagonal drum is a restoration.

San Benedetto at Conversano, San Francesco at Trani, and the Cathedral of San Corrado at Molfetta were built in the 11th to 13th centuries with pendentive domes. San Corrado also incorporates "squinch-like niches" between the pendentives and drums of two of its three domes. The Cathedral of San Corrado was built around the year 1200.

=== Kingdom of France ===
A study in 1976 of Romanesque churches in the south of France documented 130 with oval plan domes, such as the domes on pendentives at Saint-Martin-de-Gurson, Dordogne and Balzac, Charente. The oval shape appears to have been a practical solution to rectangular crossing bays. Domes were commonly under crossing towers and generally used squinches, although both squinches and pendentives were used. The oldest French pendentives were built in horizontal courses, rather than courses normal to the curve. This may have been done to better spread the weight of each course and also allow for a lighter wooden centering to be used during construction.

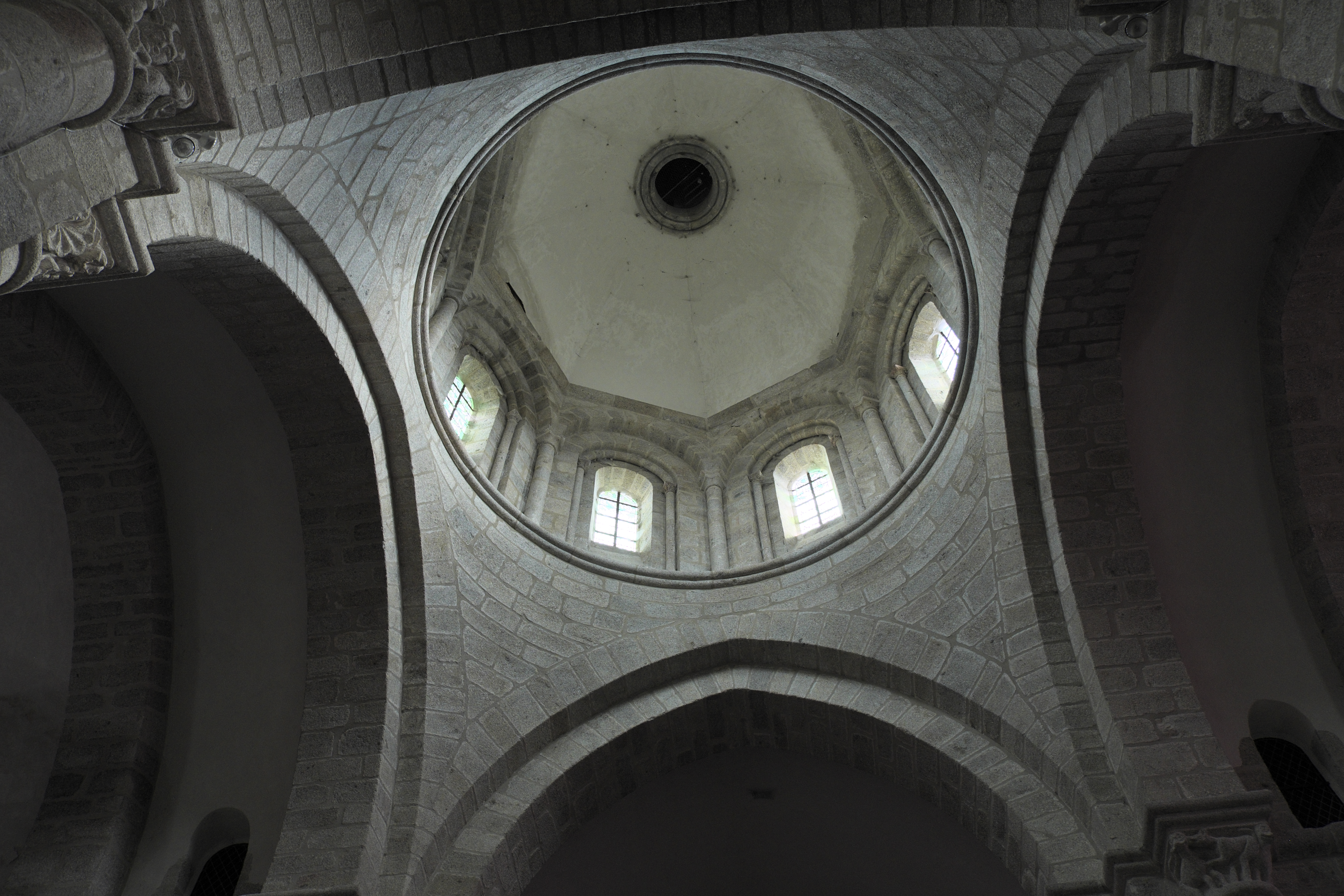
The dome of Saint-Barthélémy Church of Bénévent-l'Abbaye

Pendentives became popular in France throughout the 12th century. By the middle of the 12th century, the use of drums with windows beneath the domes allowed in more light. Octagonal drums were preferred. Examples include the crossing domes at Obazine Abbey and the church of La Dorat in the Limousin region, and the Church of Saint-Léonard-de-Noblat. The church at Saint-Junien in the Limousin region experimented with flattened pendentives and pointed arches to support a crossing dome before 1101. Other examples include the crossing domes of the church of St. Étienne at Nevers (c. 1097), the Basilica of Notre-Dame du Port (built in the 11th and 12th centuries), the basilica at Orcival (12th century), and the church of Saint-Nectaire. In the latter three examples, the crossing dome is supported on the north and south sides by adjacent half or full barrel vaults. Another example of a crossing dome on an octagonal drum and pendentives that is part of a tall lantern tower is Saint-Barthélémy Church of Bénévent-l'Abbaye.

The church of Saint-Michel d'Entraigues was a centralized lobed building built near Angoulême.

In the Aquitaine region of southwest France, there are a large number of domed Romanesque churches, with over 250 in the Périgord region alone. The area is far from ports with regular contact with the east and the source of influence is not entirely settled. The greatest concentration of these churches in the Dordogne department are in the northwest portion. Of the roughly six hundred Romanesque churches in that area, there are 168 domes ranging from 2 meters to 15 meters in diameter. The most common diameter is four meters. The churches in this region typically do not have aisles, and their naves began to be covered by a series of domes around the year 1100. Between the Garonne and Loire rivers there are known to have been at least seventy-seven churches whose naves were covered by a line of domes. Half of them are in the Périgord region. Most date to the twelfth century and sixty of them survive.

The churches with a file of domes over their naves used pointed arches and pendentives and were built following the First Crusade, roughly from 1105 to 1150. The use of pendentives to support domes in the Aquitaine region, rather than the squinches more typical of western medieval architecture, strongly implies a Byzantine influence. The Romanesque domes used stone masonry, rather than the lighter ceramic material of Byzantine practice, and the greater weight sometimes caused structural problems. Domes in this area being arranged in linear series has suggested the contemporary architecture of Cyprus as the inspiration, which was located on a pilgrimage route to the Holy Land. Cyprus had developed its own style of domed basilica during its period of neutrality between Byzantine and Arab rulers, using three domes of roughly equal size in a line over the nave and very little lighting. There are indications of a connection between Aquitaine and Cyprus just after the First Crusade.

Precisely dating the domes and determining the order in which the buildings were completed has been difficult, in part because of "drastic 19th century over-restoration". Possible early domes may have existed at the church of Saint-Astier, Dordogne, which was founded in 1010 although little of the original construction remains, and at Saint-Avit-Sénieur (c. 1117), whose original three domes were replaced with "domed up Anjou vaults" in the 13th century.

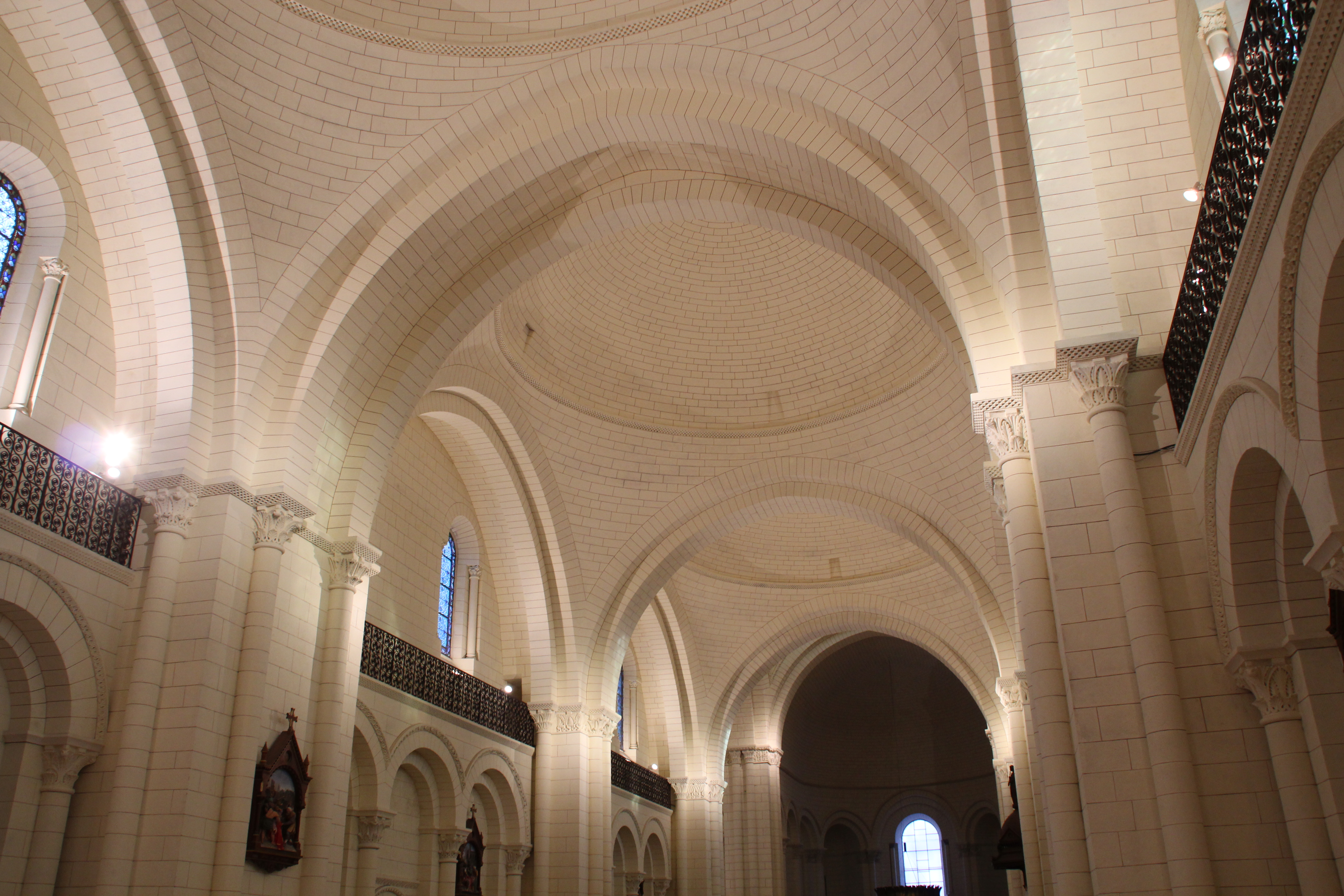
The nave of Angoulême Cathedral

Angoulême Cathedral was built from 1105 to 1128. Its long nave is covered by four stone domes on pendentives, springing from pointed arches, the last of which covers the crossing and is surmounted by a stone lantern. The westernmost of the Angoulême domes is the earliest, constructed between 1100 and 1125. Four small recesses at the base of each nave dome, just above the cornices, were likely used to secure wooden centering formwork during construction. Later stone domes in the region have four small windows in a similar location that may have been used in the same way. The domes of Angoulême Cathedral and some other contemporary churches in the region, particularly rural examples, were originally hidden on the exterior by a gable roof.

The external roofing and small number of windows in the domes of the region (no more than four) indicate that the domes were not intended to serve as lanterns. Although the concentration of thrust into the corners of the domed bays allowed for large windows to be in the walls beneath the dome arches, only some of the churches took advantage of this. The more rural domed churches usually have just one small window per bay and remain dark.

Unlike the domes of Angoulême Cathedral, the domes of the church of St. Étienne at Périgueux and Cahors Cathedral were visible on the exterior. The domes of St. Étienne at Périgueux preceded the larger ones at Cahors Cathedral. St. Étienne originally had four domes, but two were destroyed in the 16th century. Of the remaining two, the earlier one was completed around 1125 the later one by 1163. Cahors Cathedral (c. 1100–1140) covers its nave with two large domes in the same manner and influenced the later building at Souillac. The domes at Cahors have a diameter of more than 15 metres (50 ft). The dome exteriors were expressed with a brick covering before the 1840s. At Souillac, the cruciform church had a dome over the crossing and two more over the nave. The domes were originally expressed externally, with a flat-stone roof resting directly on the exterior surface. The lanterns on the domes at Souillac were added in a 19th-century restoration.

Fontevraud Abbey served as a burial place for Plantagenet royalty, including Richard the Lionheart, and is one of the most impressive examples. The earlier domed crossing is preceded by a wider nave covered by four domes, which was begun in 1125. The pendentives are original, but the four nave domes are modern replacements from about 1910. Originally designed as a three-aisled hall church with barrel vaults, after the choir was completed the nave was redesigned with piers to support the line of domes spanning the full width. The Abbaye aux Dames in Saintes was likewise remodeled during construction to allow for its domes.

Solignac Abbey (prior to 1142) used granite and has relatively squat proportions, but the domed eastern arm was built with a domed nave in mind. The transept arms were originally barrel vaulted. The domes were originally covered by tiles on the exterior.

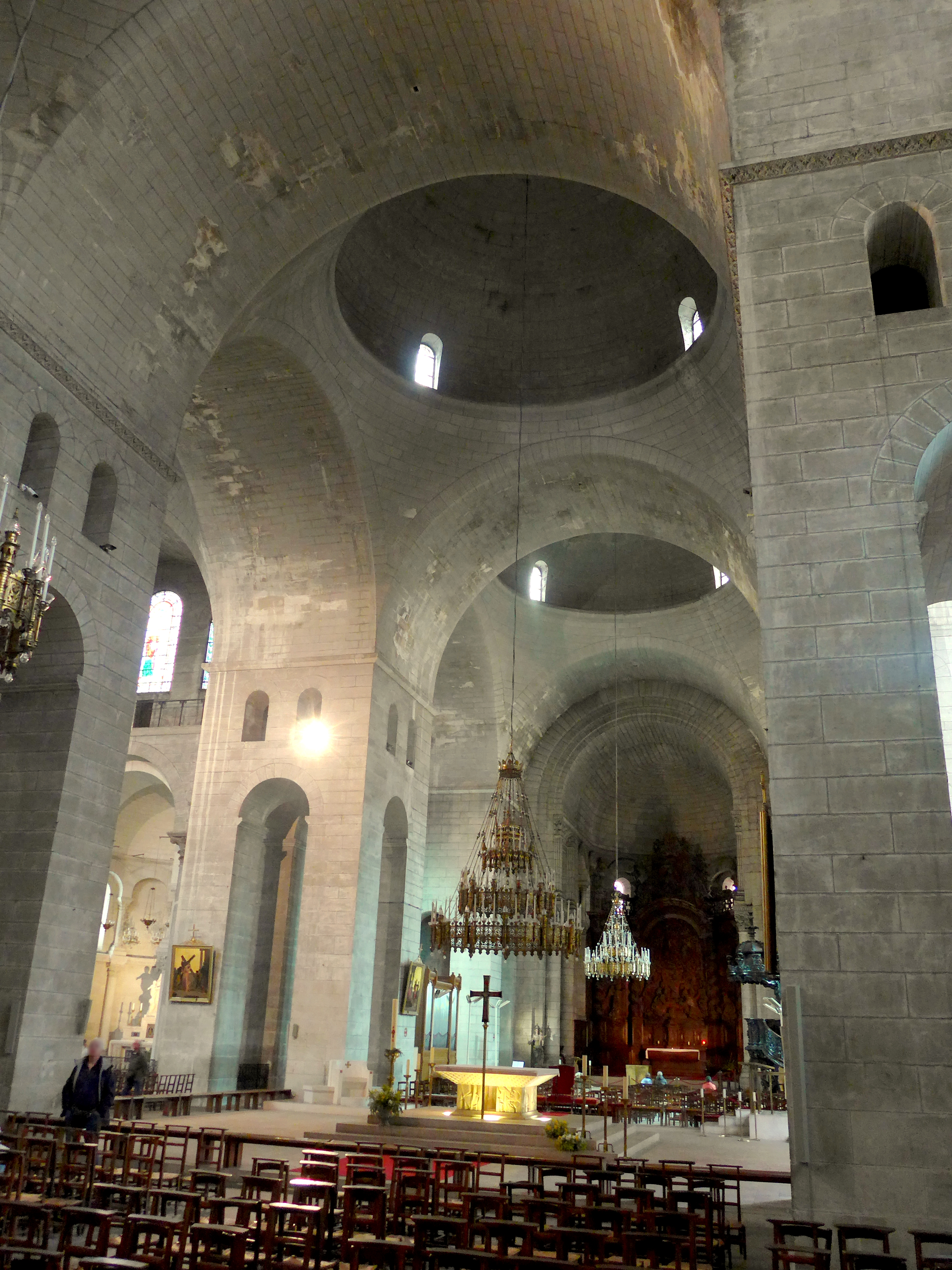
The cathedral of S. Front at Périgueux

The cathedral of S. Front at Périgueux was built around 1125–1150 and derives its five-domed cruciform plan ultimately from the Church of the Holy Apostles in Constantinople. One of the domes covers part of the choir, the rest of which is covered by a barrel vault and apse half-dome, although most domed churches in the region used only a barrel vault and apse half-dome for the choir. The domes differ from normal Byzantine practice in the use of stone, rather than a lighter material such as brick, and that difference may help explain the other differences, such as the domes being slightly pointed and at least semicircular, rather than segmental, springing from a distance set back from the circle formed by the pendentives, rather than directly from the circle, and resting on pendentives with complex curves that begin at the lower side of the supporting arch voussoirs, rather than quarter-circle pendentives beginning at the upper side. The S. Front domes had dressed stone only on the lowest levels prior to alterations by Paul Abadie in the 19th century. The alterations included replacing the original pendentive masonry and the rough courses of stone in the domes. There was a wooden roof covering the domes from about 1760, but originally the domes were visible externally and covered by tiles.

Twelfth century examples include the Saint Nicolas Church of Trémolat, Church of Saint Mary of Bourg-des-Maisons, Saint Pierre-aux-Liens Church in Allemans, Church of Notre-Dame-de-l'Assomption in Verteillac, and Saint Timothée Church in Paussac. Other examples include the church of Cherval, which has four domes covering its 27 meter by 5.3 meter interior, the church of Notre-Dame de Bourg-du-Bost, whose later painted decoration dates from the 14th-16th centuries, and the more typical church of Saint-Martial-Viveyrol. Churches in Perigord and Saintonge with a file of domes built between roughly 1160 and 1180 include Boschaud Abbey, La Tenaille Abbey, Abbey of Our Lady of the Assumption of Châtres, Sablonceaux Abbey, Saint-Romain Church of Saint-Romain-de-Benet, Collegiate Church of Saint-Émilion, and Saint-Martin Church of Gensac-la-Pallue.

The domed crossing of the Abbey Church of Sainte-Foy was built by 1130.

The first "Angevin pseudo-polygonal vault" was the octagonal rib dome with Gothic corner squinches built over the square porch of the Abbey of Saint-Florent in Saumur (c. 1180). It was the model for similar vaults in the chapter house at Church of Sainte-Radegonde in Poitiers (c. 1220), St. Catherine's Chapel at Fontevraud (1225), and the churches of Fontaines-en-Sologne, Clussais-la-Pommeraie, and Saint-Pierre de Soubise (early 13th century).

The octagonal crossing of Ferrières Abbey (late 1100s - early 1200s) may be an imitation of the Palatine Chapel at Aachen. It is an irregular octagon, with the arches in the cardinal direction slightly wider than the diagonal arches, and the span is 10.6 meters. A similar octagon was built in Nidaros Cathedral in Norway (1183 - early 1200s). The crossing of Saint Nicholas at Blois is an example of a "double chevet" dome, as is that of Coutances Cathedral (second half of the 13th century).

Gothic rib vaulting superseded the use of domes in south-west France after the 12th century. The church at Saint-Avit-Sénieur appears to have been designed for domes but they may never have been built. The nave is covered instead by ribbed Angevin style vaults. The "domical shape of Angevin vaults", like those seen in Angers Cathedral, may be due to the influence of the Romanesque domed churches. The foundations of Bordeaux Cathedral indicate that it originally had a nave covered with a line of three domes like those of Angoulême Cathedral but it was rebuilt in the 13th century with a vaulted ceiling. Saintes Cathedral may also have originally had domes over its nave.

=== Holy Roman Empire ===
==== Kingdom of Italy ====
Churches in northern Italy after 1100 were designed with vaulting from the outset, rather than as colonnaded basilicas with timber roofs and, like the Rhenish imperial cathedrals, many have octagonal domes with squinches over their crossings or choirs. Examples include Parma Cathedral, rebuilt around 1130, and Piacenza Cathedral (1122–1235). Another example is the domed church of San Fedele in Como (11th to 12th century), similar to the church of St. Maria im Kapitol. The east ends of the Basilica of San Fedele and St. Maria im Kapitol, with ambulatory passages around the transept arms, appear to imitate the Basilica of San Lorenzo in Milan.

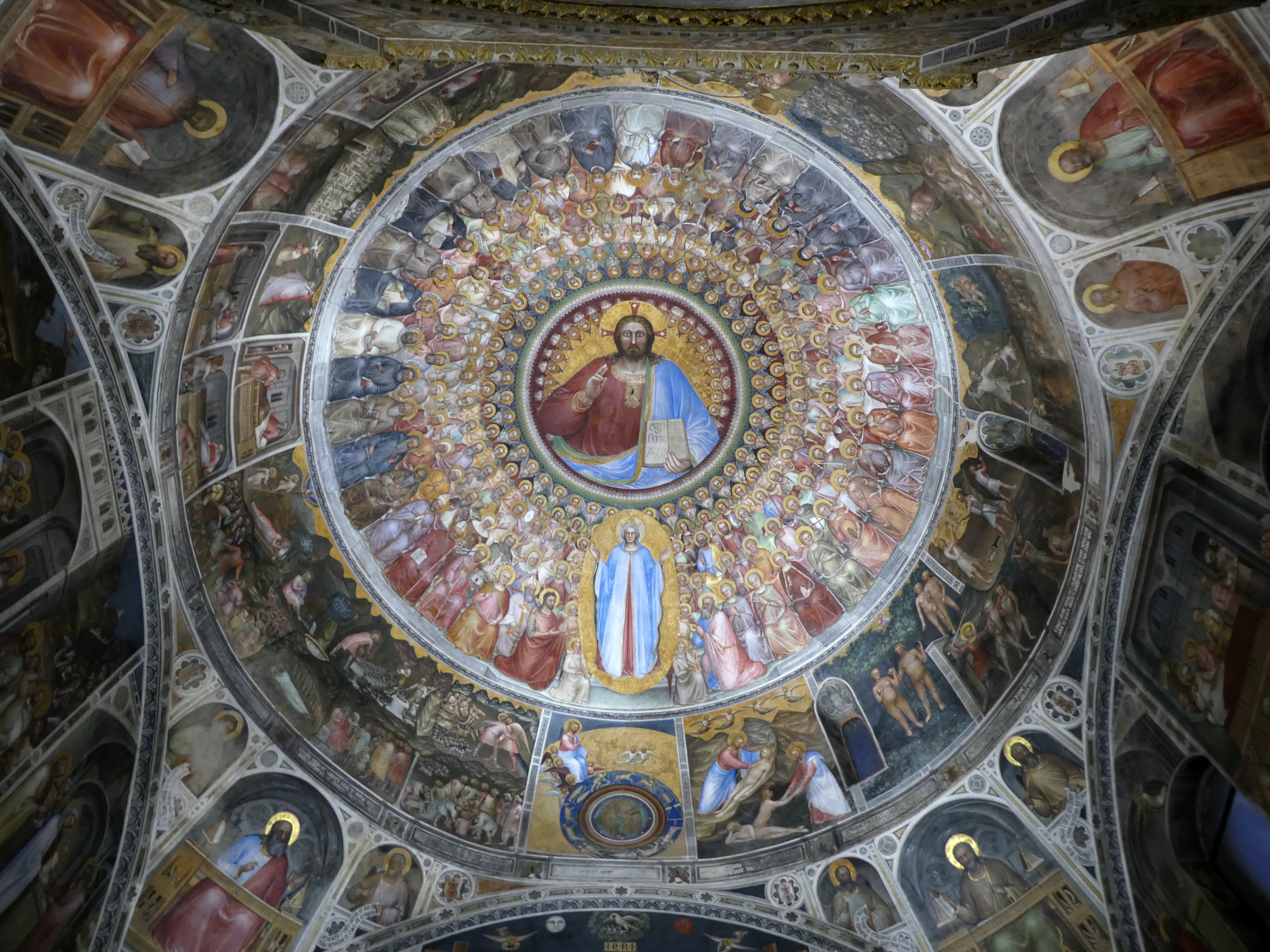
The Padua Baptistery

The Padua Baptistery is believed to have been built contemporaneously with the 1120s reconstruction of Padua Cathedral, a revision of the traditional foundation date of 1260. It has a dome on pendentives spanning an 11.6 meter square space, with a small altar chapel through the eastern wall. It served as a model for the later Old Sacristy of San Lorenzo. The domed square form of the building may have been inspired by ancient mausolea from the Near East.

The Old Cathedral of Brescia was likely built in the first quarter of the 12th century and has a dome over a meter thick, made of heavy stone at the bottom and lighter porous stone at the top. In Tarquinia, the oval stone dome on squinches over the church of San Giacomo (c. 1121–1140) may have been inspired by the dome of Pisa Cathedral. A dome on pendentives in Tarquinia was completed around 1190 as part of the cathedral of Sta. Maria di Castello and was similar to others in Tuscany and the Veneto. It was destroyed by an earthquake in 1819.

The dome of the Basilica of San Lorenzo in Milan, a tetraconch building with a central space 23.8 meters square, was rebuilt in the Romanesque style after a fire in 1124. Much admired in the Renaissance, its dome collapsed in 1573 and was rebuilt with the present cloister vault. The dome was said to have been modeled on the dome of the Pantheon and was often compared to it during the Renaissance. The building was mistakenly thought to have been the site of a Temple of Mercury that was renovated by Emperor Maximian and dedicated as a Temple of Hercules. Documentary evidence indicates that the Romanesque dome of San Lorenzo was a thin hemisphere of light material over a cube of space about 23.8 meters (40 Milanese braccia) on each side. The dome was supported by four corner squinches resting on the four exedrae arches of the square space with a further eight smaller squinches between each of them to create a sixteen-sided base. It was covered on the exterior by a cylindrical or polygonal drum and timber roof. The exterior drum was likely polygonal, with eight or sixteen sides, and had two levels of dwarf galleries beneath a cornice row of hanging arches. Evidence remains in the building's eastern corner towers of flying buttresses extending diagonally to the drum. The existence of a small lantern at the top of the dome is uncertain and the date the dome was completed is unknown.

The cathedral of Sovana (1153–1175) and the church of San Salvatore at Terni (about 1200) were constructed with local materials and have precedents in the region. The alternating stone and brick rings of the dome over the Rotuna of Montesiepi at the Abbey of San Galgano are unusual but may be part of Tuscan decorative polychrome banding. It was built in the 1180s as a commemorative chapel with a hemispherical dome over a cylindrical rotunda and the top 16 rings are all in brick, giving the impression of an oculus at the top of the dome.

The Baptistery of Parma, one of the largest baptisteries, was begun in 1196 and has dome frescoes dating from 1260 onwards.

The crossing dome of Massa Marittima Cathedral in south Tuscany was built in the 13th century as a 7.1 meter tall brick octagonal cloister vault on squinches over a rectangular space of 8.5 meters by 9.7 meters. An external domed shell was replaced in 1930 with a pitched roof of planar faces.

The dome of Siena Cathedral had an exposed profile as early as 1224, and this feature was retained in its reconstruction around 1260. The dome has two shells and was completed in 1264. It is set over an irregular 17.7-metre-wide (58 ft) hexagon with squinches to form an irregular twelve-sided base. No large dome had ever before been built over a hexagonal crossing. The current lantern dates from the 17th century and the current outer dome is a 19th-century replacement.

The crossing dome of Ancona Cathedral was visible externally.

Chiaravalle Abbey in Milan included an octagonal dome under its tower, supported on squinches, dated to the end of the 13th century.

An octagonal dome for Florence Cathedral may have been part of the original design by Arnolfo di Cambio for the church, construction of which began in 1296.

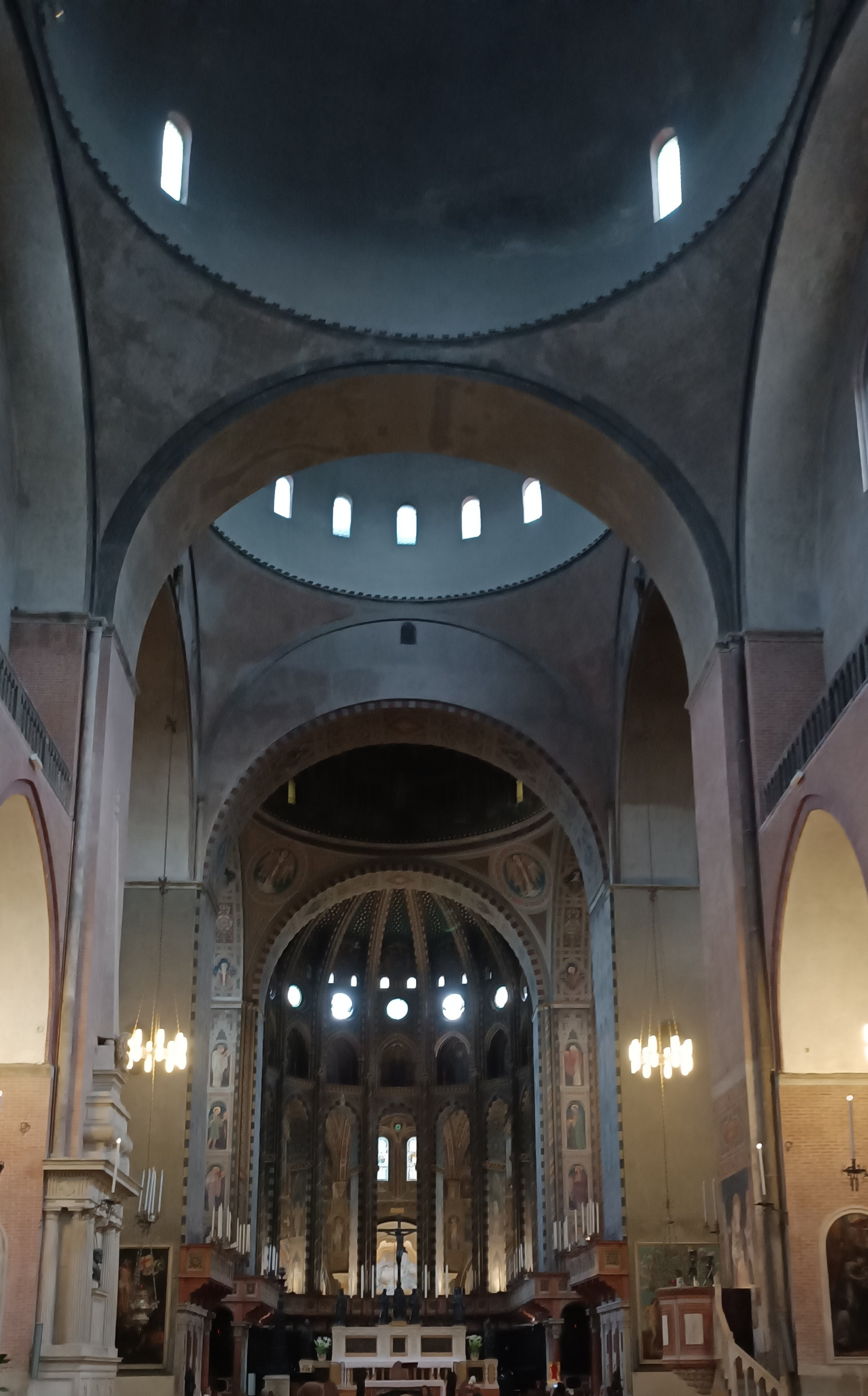
The Basilica of St. Anthony of Padua

The Basilica of St. Anthony of Padua was similar to the Byzantine Church of the Holy Apostles. It was built between 1231 and 1300, in the early period of Italian Gothic architecture, and features seven domes with a blend of Gothic and Byzantine elements. Similar to St Mark's Basilica in Venice, its nave, transepts, crossing, and the intermediate bay before the choir are covered by domes on pendentives in the Byzantine style. Externally, the crossing dome is covered with a conical spire. The choir dome, which may be later than the others, is uniquely Gothic with ribs. An eighth dome covers the attached Relics Chapel, adjacent to the choir dome. The masonry domes are covered externally by timber structures and several were repaired following a 1347 lightning strike and a 1748 fire. The two nearest the facade may be in their original condition. The inner brick domes range from 13.62 to 14.48 meters in diameter. Dendrochronological analysis confirmed original timbers in three of the eight outer domes: the two westernmost domes near the facade and the northern transept dome over the Chapel of St. Anthony. They may be the oldest timber domes in Europe. The other four outer coverings (over the crossing dome, the dome over the south transept, the presbytery dome, and the choir dome) were replaced after 1749. The easternmost dome over the Chapel of the Relics was built in the 18th century.

==== Kingdom of Germany ====
The crossing of Worms Cathedral is an example of a "double chevet" dome.

The domed "Decagon" nave of St. Gereon's Basilica in Cologne, Germany, a ten-sided space in an oval shape, was built between 1219 and 1227 upon the remaining low walls of a 4th-century Roman mausoleum. The ribbed domical vault rises four stories and 34 meters above the floor, covering an oval area 23.5 meters long and 18.7 meters wide. It may have served as a burial place for the Frankish kings before being modified to serve as a church. It is unique among the twelve Romanesque churches of Cologne, and in European architecture in general, and may have been the largest dome built in this period in Western Europe until the completion of the dome of Florence Cathedral.

The crossing dome of the Church of the Holy Apostles in Cologne (early to mid 13th century) has a lantern that may have been inspired by the Florence Baptistery.

=== Abbasid Caliphate ===
==== Almoravid dynasty ====
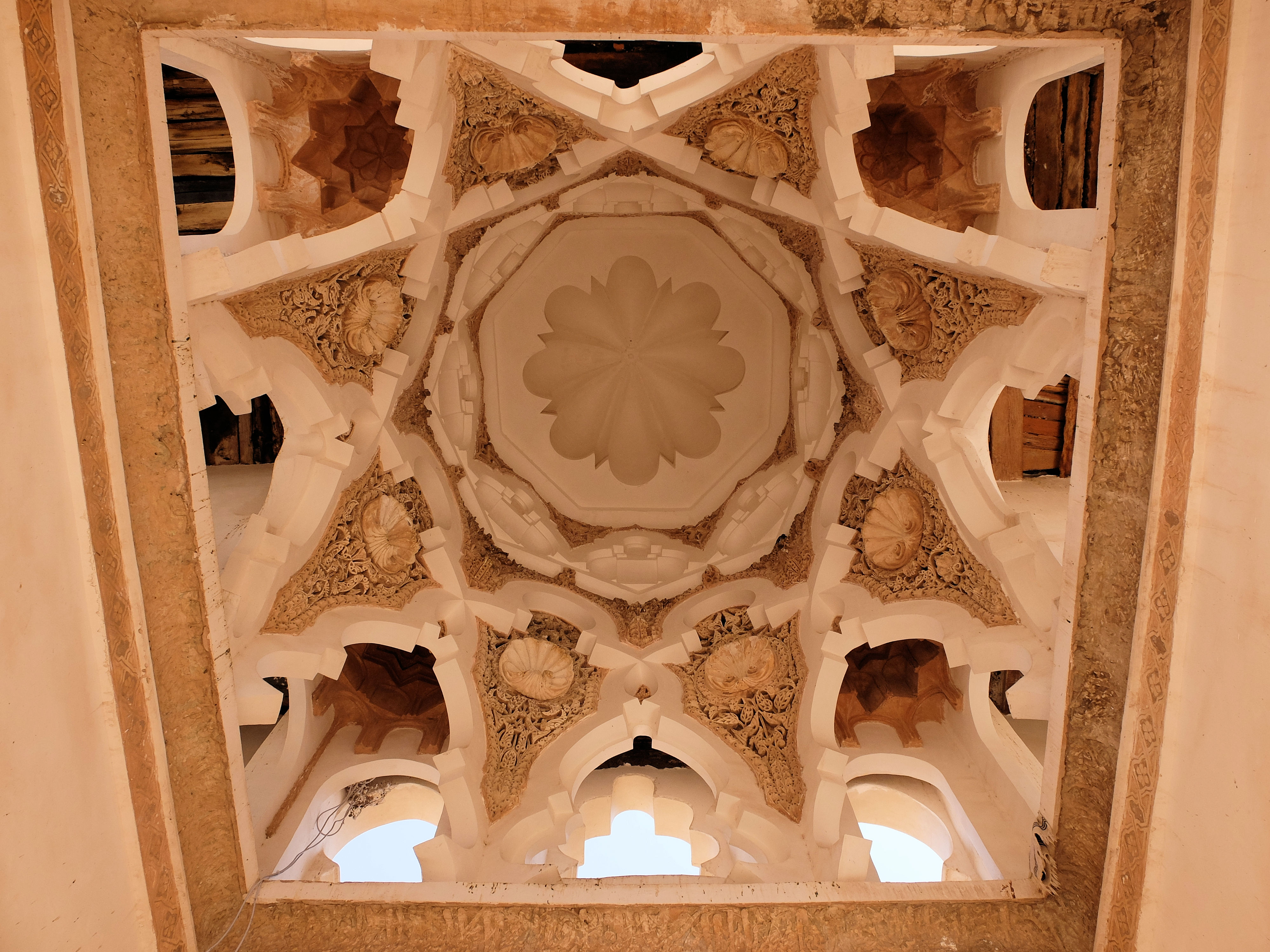
The Qubbat Barudiyyin

After the ninth century, mosques in North Africa often have a small decorative dome over the mihrab. Additional domes are sometimes used at the corners of the mihrab wall and at the entrance bay. The square tower minarets of two or more stories are capped by small domes. Examples include the Djamaa el Kebir mosque (probably of the 11th century), and the Great Mosque of Tlemcen (1303).

The intersecting rib domes of the Great Mosque in Cordoba appear in North Africa in the dome of the Qubbat Barudiyyin (c. 1120) in Marrakesh. The dome has multifoil arches and carved stucco with vegetal and shell patterns. Unlike the Cordoba ribs, those of the Almoravid Qubba are hidden such that the structure appears to be three layers of tri-lobed squinches supporting the dome. Behind each of the lowest squinches is a small lobed dome on two layers of muqarnas. The design of the dome appears to blend the style of domes at Cordoba with those at Baghdad. The dome has two shells of masonry, which is unique in the western Islamic world and suggests an eastern influence. Wooden inserts link the two shells. The inner dome is brick with a thick layer of carved plaster on the interior forming eight ribs between eight lobes. It may have originally been painted, but no traces survive. The exterior dome has a pattern of interlaced arches below a chevron pattern that creates a seven-pointed star at the peak. The dome decoration may have been similar to that on now-lost Abbasid domes at the Haram of Mecca, according to an account of those domes by Ibn Jubayr, which may themselves reflect a dome type in the Abbasid capital of Baghdad. It may have been built in 1117 as a shelter for a fountain celebrating the completion of a water supply system for the city. It is one of the few Almoravid structures in their capital city not destroyed by the Almohads. After the destruction of the Almoravid palace and mosque, the Almohads made the structure serve as an ablution fountain surrounded by latrines.

A dome of Qarawiyyin Mosque (1135) is also similar to the maqsurah dome of the Great Mosque of Cordoba. The squinches are half groin vaults, as are the vast majority of squinches in the Maghreb region. The exterior of the Qarawiyyin Mosque dome has a vertical zig-zag decoration, as does the dome of the Bayn al-Qahaoui in Sousse.

In Islamic North Africa, there are several early muqarnas domes dating from the twelfth century. The earliest may be an Almoravid restoration between 1135 and 1140 of a series of stucco muqarnas domes over the axial nave of the mosque of the Qarawiyyin in Fez. The existence of a near contemporary example from 1154 in the maristan of Nur al-din in Damascus, Syria, and the earlier example of a muqarnas dome in al-Dawr, Iraq, suggests that the style was imported from Baghdad.

==== Ayyubid dynasty ====
Ayyubid domes tended to be smooth, hemispherical or stilted forms with no external drum. The domes were supported by squinches above the square bay walls, corresponding to what were often stepped exterior transition zones. This continued to be the structure used in Cairo domes until the mid 14th century. The curved squinch forms used by the Fatimids were replaced by the Ayyubids with more angular forms. An interior zone of transition with three tiers of squinches was first used by the Ayyubids, resulting in a higher dome.

Bulbous domes were used to cover large buildings in Syria after the eleventh century.

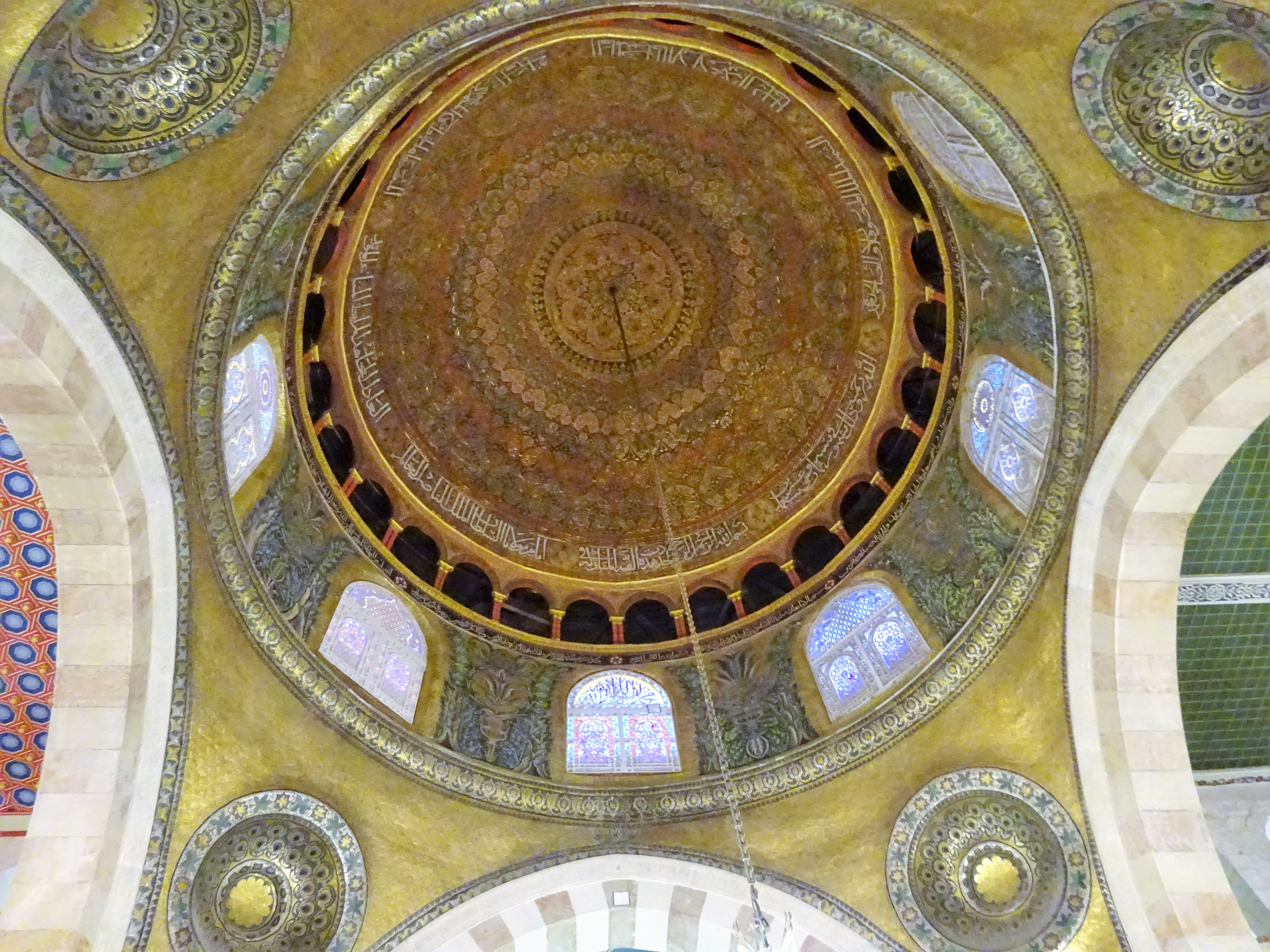
The dome of the Al-Aqsa Mosque

After his conquest of the city of Jerusalem, Saladin rebuilt the dome of the Al-Aqsa Mosque as it is today, as part of extensive restorations. On the same platform as the Dome of the Rock, Saladin built the commemorative Qubbat Yusuf. He built the Qubbat Sulayman (1200) and the Qubbat al-Miʿrāj (1200-1201) using materials from Crusader buildings. The Qubba al-Nahawiyya (1207-1208) was built at the southwest corner of the platform at the behest of Al-Mu'azzam Isa, the governor of Damascus.

The Mausoleum of Imam al-Shafi'i (built in 1211) has a large wooden double dome (rebuilt in 1722) about 29 meters high and, with the tombs of al-Malik al-Silah and the so-called Tomb of the Abbasid Caliphs, is one of three important Ayyubid tombs in Cairo dating from the first half of the 13th century. The diameter of the dome of the tomb of the Abbasid Caliphs is 6.76 meters. The dome of the Mausoleum of Imam al-Shafi'i has the earliest example of the three-tiered squinch, made in wood. The domed mausoleum was built 35 years after the madrassa ordered by Saladin at the site in 1176–7, introduced in Egypt after 1171 to counter Shia Islam.

As part of a 1217-1218 remodeling of the front porch of Al-Aqsa Mosque, Al-Mu'azzam Isa added a dome on pendentives to the porch's central bay, in front of the entrance. It is not known whether the Templar-era porch had a similar dome.

The largest preserved Ayyubid dome is that of the Matbakh al-'Ajami in Aleppo, resting on muqarnas pendentives. It may have been the palace residence of the al-'Ajami family.

Madrasas in Syria between the mid-12th century and the end of the 13th century normally included a mosque with a central dome flanked by barrel vaults. In Aleppo, the Al-Zahiriyah Madrasa begun by Az-Zahir Ghazi includes six domes. In Al-Firdaws Madrasa (1235–1237), built by princess Dayfa Khatun in Aleppo, the mosque dome above the mihrab has five rows of muqarnas in the transition zone.

Ayyubid ruler Al-Ashraf Musa built the Al-Tawbah Mosque in Damascus in 1235 similar to the Artuqid domed mosque style. The smooth dome is supported by a sixteen-sided drum with windows in alternating sides, created by eight squinches over an octagon which was itself created by four squinches over the bay in front of the mihrab.

The Qubbat Musa was added in 1249 by As-Salih Ayyub after taking the city of Jerusalem from Crusaders in 1244.

Almost 100 Ayyubid tombs survive in Damascus; most are from the 13th century. The two domes of al-Madrasa al-Jahariksiyya in the Damascus suburb of Al-Salihiyah were built by Amir Sarim al-Din Khatluba as tombs for himself and Amir Fakhr al-Din Jaharks al-Nasiri al-Salahi.

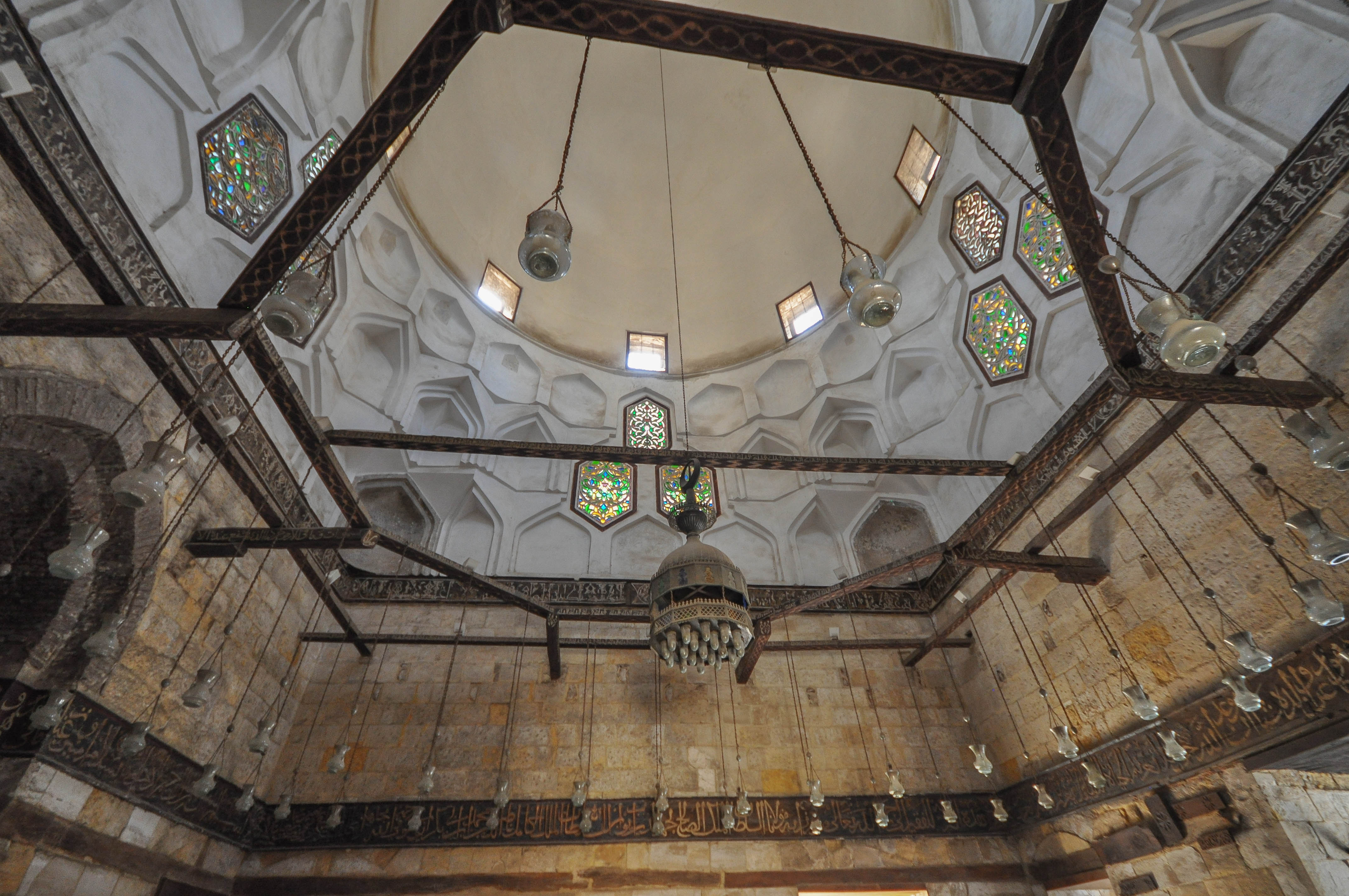
The Salihiyya Madrasa

Domes at Ayyubid and Mamluk madrasas in Cairo were funerary. The dome of the Mausoleum of Shajar al-Durr (1250) has a diameter of 7.17 meters. Brick three-tiered squinches were used at Salihiyya Madrasa (1243–1250). Built by As-Salih Ayyub on the site of the Fatimid Eastern Palace, it is the only madrassa from the period to partly survive. The 10 meter wide domed tomb at its northern end led to the series of funerary madrassas built in Cairo by the Mamluk Sultans. It was the largest dome in Eqypt up to that point. It has trefoil arches over the corners of the bay, five-foil arches on the walls, and a 20-sided base for the dome.

==== Rasulid dynasty ====
In the Yemen area, the earliest surviving domed mosques are under the Rasulids, with a large central dome that has pairs on smaller domes on the sides. Earlier examples may have been built by the Ayyubids, who also introduced madrasas to the area, but they have not survived. Examples include the Asadiyya Madrasa at Ibb (built before 1258), which also has domes at the corners of the forecourt arcades, and the Mudhaffar Mosque at Taʿizz (1249–1295), which has a domed central bay flanked on either side by paired smaller domes and another large dome. The tower is also topped by a small dome. Smaller mosques, which had been built with flat roofs, also began to be built with domes.

==== Mamluk Sultanate ====
Over the course of 250 years, around 400 domes were built in Cairo to cover the tombs of Mamluk sultans and emirs. Mamluk domes were also built over palaces, hammams, and zawiyas. Dome profiles were varied, with "keel-shaped", bulbous, ogee, stilted domes, and others being used. On the drum, angles were chamfered, or sometimes stepped, externally and triple windows used in a tri-lobed arrangement on the faces. Accentuating the transitional zone produced higher domes and most Mamluk domes and transitional zones together are taller than their building's facade. The stalactites of squinches and pendentives in the architecture of Cairo are non-structural and each row is supported by a stone corbel or a wooden plank. Shallow vestibule domes were usually stone.

===== Bahri dynasty =====
The style and technique of Mamluk dome architecture was in the Fatimid and Ayyubid tradition. Bahri Mamluk domes used two types of profile until the mid-fourteenth century: a profile that curves beginning immediately above the drum, and a profile that curves after a cylindrical section above the drum that is less than a third of the total dome height. The latter would be favored for brick and masonry domes that were built in Cairo after the mid-fourteenth century.

The architectural rules for dome transitional zones established by the Fatimids and Ayyubids were not continued by the Bahri Mamluks, who innovated in structural, decorative, and constructive techniques. Internally, the squinches of the zone of transition developed into miniaturized and pointed versions that were used row upon row over the entire expanded zone and bordered above and below by plain surfaces. Pendentives were adopted in Cairo after they were used in Aleppo. In the provinces, concave transitional zones were characteristic, but never appeared in Cairo.

The transition zone of the dome of tomb of Fāṭima Khātūn (1284) uses squinches with corbelled layers of muqarnas and can be considered a test case for constructing transitional zones for large domes. Early examples include the domes of Salihiyya Madrasa (1283–1284), which has interior squinches filled in with stalactite pendentives, the Mausoleum of Sultan Qalawun (1284–1285), which has no interior zone of transition, and the mausoleum of Al-Ashraf Khalil (1288), which uses stalactite squinches. The Qubbat al-Ṣawābī (1286 or 1335) has muqarnas similar to those of Gunbad-i Khākī in Isfahan, Iran.

The domes of the tomb of Fāṭima Khātūn and the Ribāṭ Aḥmad b. Sulaymān (1291) use "double-arch facets" in their muqarnas support, a technique that only appears in Egypt. Two layers of these facets reduce the diameter of the dome of Ribāṭ Aḥmad b. Sulaymān to 3.3 meters while increasing the height of its transitional section. One of the two domes of Zāwiyat al-Abbār (1285) has three layers of muqarnas form a 24-sided base. Nine examples of domes resting on five-foil arches on both the walls and corners date between 1284 and 1321.

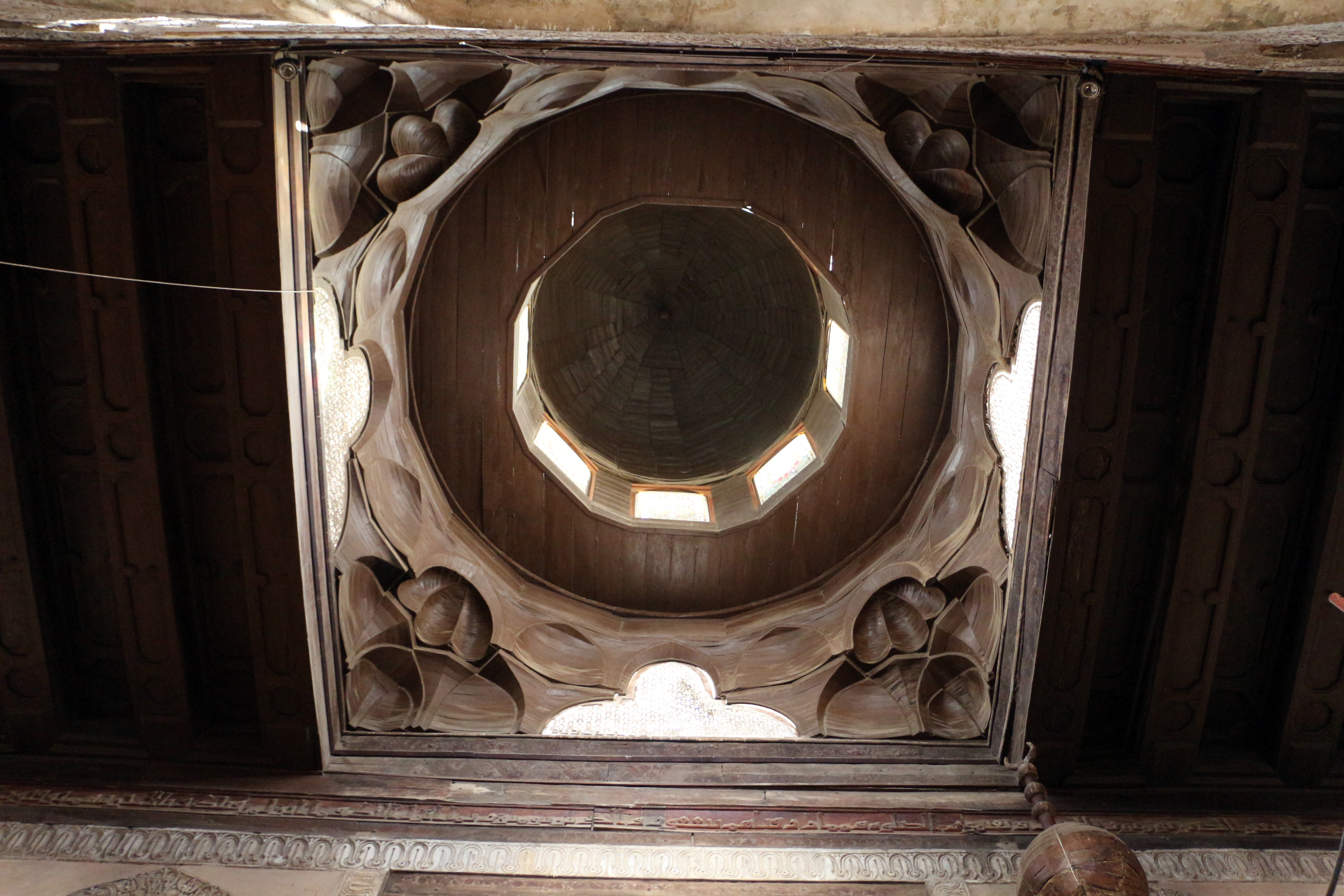
Wooden mihrab dome at the Mosque of Ibn Tulun

The wooden dome with wooden squinches over the mihrab of the Mosque of Ibn Tulun appears to have been restored by Sultan Lajin in 1295–1296. It includes a "a half-star unit with a partite petal facet like that seen in Syrian stone muqarnas". The wooden muqarnas are the earliest existing examples in Cairo.

The domed prayer hall and maqam of the zawiya of Dayr al-Shaykh may have been built in the 13th century for the remains of Islamic religious teacher Sultan Badr. The maqam may have been built slightly later. The prayer hall dome is a hemisphere on a circular drum with four windows and spherical pendentives that spring from ground level, suggesting the level of the floor was originally lower. There is a tomb on the south side of the chamber. The maqam is a smaller square building with an elliptical-profile dome over squinches in a chamber measuring 2 meters by 2 meters. The south side of the dome has a hole that admits light.

=== Influence of the Church of the Holy Sepulchre ===
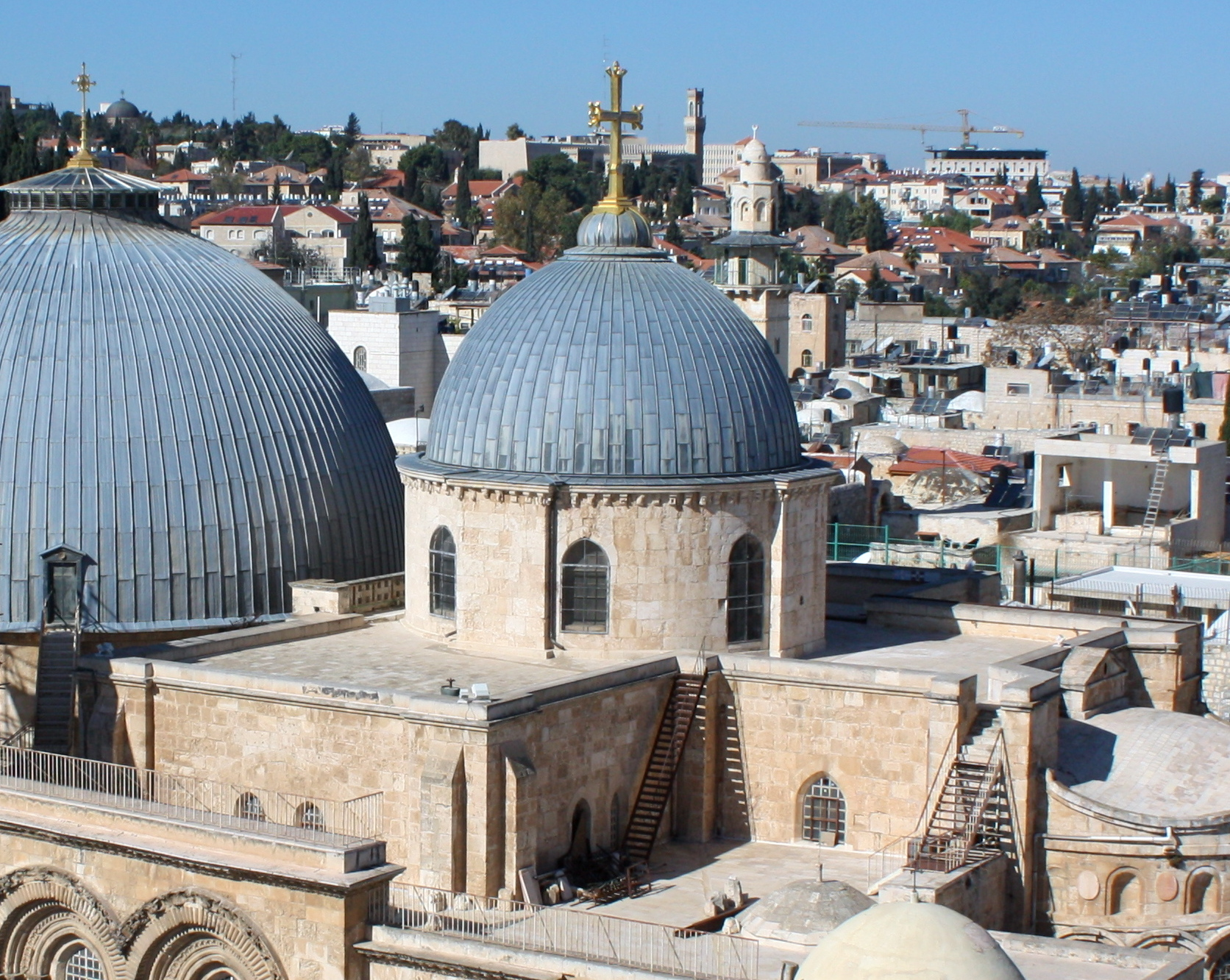
Church of the Holy Sepulchre Catholicon

The Church of the Holy Sepulchre in Jerusalem seems to have had a wooden dome in two shells up to the 12th century, with some interruptions. After establishing control of the city, the crusaders added a choir with a dome next to the existing rotunda. The French Romanesque addition replaced the eastern apse of the rotunda and a courtyard marking the center of the world and was consecrated on July 15, 1149, the fiftieth anniversary of the capture of the city. The new dome's diameter of 10.4 meters was half that of the rotunda and it rested on four pointed arches on four pillars. It served as the coronation site for the crusader kings of Jerusalem and its relation to the larger dome over the rotunda may have been intended to mirror the relationship between the domes of the Dome of the Rock and the Al-Aqsa Mosque on the Temple Mount.

The rotunda itself was covered by a conical structure from the 12th to the early 19th century. Pisa Baptistry was built in 1153 with a truncated cone in clear imitation of the Holy Sepulchre; an outer dome shell was added in the 14th century. The domed baptisteries of Cremona (1176) and Parma (1196) also appear to have been influenced by the rotunda. The 12th century rotunda of the Holy Sepulchre at Santo Stefano, Bologna, and the basilica at Neuvy-Saint-Sépulchre are imitations of Jerusalem's Church of the Holy Sepulchre although, like many of the imitations across Europe, they differ in their details, including their domes. Most of these "so-called 'copies'" have a dome or domical vault. An example is a church at Almenno, Italy, which has a stone dome resting on eight supporting columns.

The Church of St. Peter in Consavia in Asti, Italy, was built in the first half of the 12th century, likely by the former crusader Bishop Landulf of Yariglia. The round building surrounds eight columns supporting an octagonal dome 4.84 meters wide, which may have originally been made of wood. It was given to the Knights Hospitaller in 1169.

The Church of the Assumption of Rieux-Minervois (second half of the 12th century) may reference the Church of the Holy Sepulchre in the 8.31 meter distance between the columns flanking its central altar, but it is unusual in its dedication to the Virgin Mary and that it has a seven-sided dome supported on four piers and three columns. This may be a reference to the seven pillars of wisdom mentioned in the Book of Proverbs.

The Dome of the Rock and the Al-Aqsa Mosque on the Temple Mount of Jerusalem were taken by the crusaders to represent the Temple of Solomon and the Palace of Solomon, respectively. The Knights Templar, headquartered at the site, built a series of centrally planned churches throughout Europe modeled on the Church of the Holy Sepulchre, with the Dome of the Rock also an influence. Examples include the church of the Vera Cruz at Segovia, the church of the Convento do Cristo at Tomar, a rotunda church in Paris destroyed during the French Revolution, and Temple Church in London. The Church of Saint Mary of Eunate was a pilgrims' burial church, rather than a Templar church, but may have been influenced by them. The Church of the Holy Sepulchre in Cambridge and the Templar's Chapel at Laon contain ribbed domes.

The round church at the Templar's Portuguese headquarters in Tomar was begun in the 1170s. Its central octagon is about 9 meters in diameter, surrounded by an ambulatory and 16-sided outer wall. The dome was rebuilt following a lightning strike in 1508.

=== Kingdom of León ===
The remains of a crossing tower on the French Church of Saint-Jean de Montierneuf from about 1140 suggest an origin for some Spanish domes in a Romanesque and transitional Gothic style. The architectural influences at work here have been much debated, with proposed origins ranging from Jerusalem, Islamic Spain, or the Limousin region in western France to a mixture of sources. The disappeared Romanesque dome over the Cathedral of Santiago de Compostela has also been proposed.

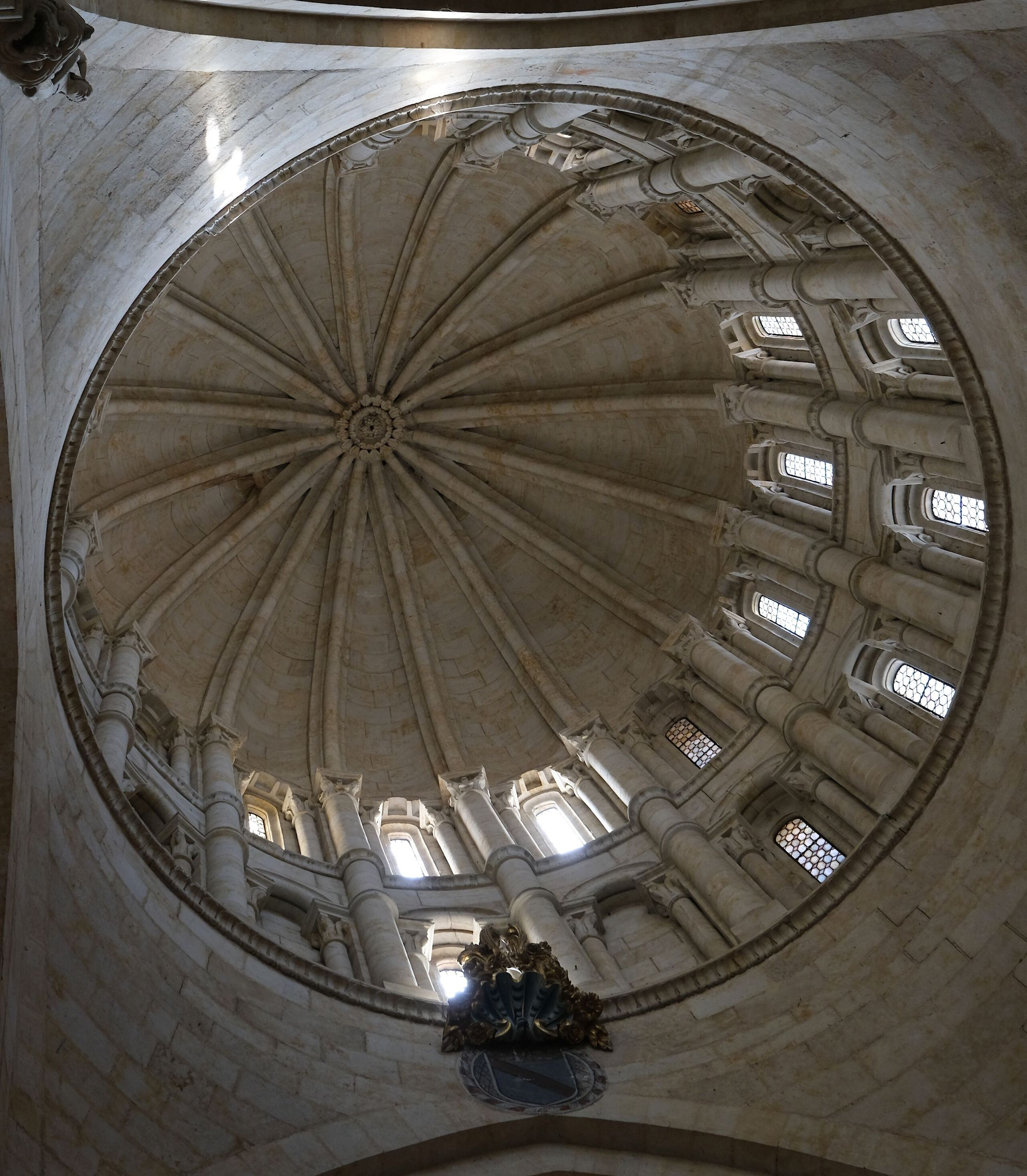
Dome over the Cathedral of Salamanca

During the Reconquista, the Kingdom of León in northern Spain built three churches famous for their domed crossing towers, called cimborrios, as it acquired new territories. The Cathedral of Zamora, the Cathedral of Salamanca, and the collegiate church of Toro were built around the middle of the 12th century. All three buildings have stone umbrella domes with sixteen ribs over windowed drums of either one or two stories, springing from pendentives. All three also have four small round towers engaged externally to the drums of the domes on their diagonal sides. A later related dome is that over the chapter house of the Old Cathedral of Plasencia. The early Gothic Cathedral of Évora in Portugal has been proposed as a late addition to the set. Perhaps the masterpiece of the series, the Salamanca crossing tower has two stories of windows in its drum. Its outer stone fish-scale roof lined with gothic crockets is a separate corbelled layer with only eight lobes, which applies weight to the haunches of the sixteen-sided inner dome. The vaulting over the nave of the old Salamanca Cathedral is covered by domes supported by diagonal ribs in the western bays and Anjou-style domed-up rib vaults in the two eastern bays.

The influence of Islamic crossed-arch domes can be seen in the dome of the Monastery of Santa María de Armenteira. The dome of the church of San Millán in Segovia is an octagonal crossed-arch dome on squinches that may have been made with concrete around the middle of the 12th century. Another unusual Spanish example from the late 12th or early 13th century is the dome of the Church of the Holy Sepulchre in Torres Del Río, on the Way of St. James. The Way, a major pilgrimage route through northern Spain to the reputed burial place of St. James the Greater, attracted pilgrims from throughout Europe, especially after pilgrimage to Jerusalem was cut off. The difficulty of travel to Jerusalem for pilgrimage prompted some new churches to be built as a form of substitute, evoking the central plan and dome of Jerusalem's Church of the Holy Sepulchre with their own variant. The dome in this case, however, is most evocative of the central mihrab dome of the Great Mosque of Cordoba. Over an octagonal room, the stone dome is formed by sixteen ribs, eight of which intersect with one another in a star pattern to define a smaller octagon at the center of the dome.

There are a number of Christian crossed-arch dome examples in Spain and the south of France from the end of the 12th century, with patterns based upon the square or octagon. The church of San Pablo in Cordoba, begun in 1241, includes two such domes: an eight pointed star dome with another eight-pointed star over the central opening, and a second dome with ribs for an eight-pointed star that transition to ribs for a central cross and square, which was copied in many Christian buildings. Other 13th-century examples are found at San Miguel de Almazán, Santa Cruz de Olorón, San Blas Hospital, Abbey of Santa María la Real de Las Huelgas, Salamanca Cathedral, and the Church of Santa María de la Oliva in Lebrija, converted from a mosque in 1249. The style experienced a revival in early 16th-century Spain when one of the crossed-arch domes of the Great Mosque of Córdoba was used as the model for domes at Zaragoza, Teruel, and Tarazona.

=== Kingdom of Castile ===
The 13th century ribbed dome on squinches at the crossing of the Church of San Pedro in Ávila, Spain is an example of a "double chevet" style dome.

=== Kingdom of Aragon ===
The dome of Tarragona Cathedral was built in the French Gothic style and includes alternating sets of three and four windows at the base. The octagonal dome was built in the middle of the 13th century and is supported by angular squinches and is similar to the dome of the Monastery of Sant Cugat.

A crossed-arch dome was built in Teruel Cathedral from 1248-1278.

=== Almohad Caliphate ===
Islamic examples of crossed-arch domes in Spain and North Africa are distinguished from contemporary Christian examples by the use of thinner and more numerous arches, such as those of the Alcázar of Seville, the Villena Castle in Alicante, the Great Mosque of Taza, and the minaret of Koutoubia Mosque. The Tower of the Prison, or Torre de la Cercel, at Castillo de Alcalá la Real includes two star-ribbed domes.

The Mosque of the Seven Sleepers in Chenini supports its small dome on four horizontal shelves over the corners of its square bay. This solution, using wood or stone shelves to support small domes, normally less than 5 meters in diameter, was used in simple buildings such as marabouts.

== See also ==
- History of architecture
- Medieval technology
- Rib vault – Architectural feature to cover a wide space
- Pointed arch (architecture) – Arch with a pointed crown
