= Santa Maria in Castello, Tarquinia =

Church building in Tarquinia, Italy

Facciata Santa Maria in Castello.jpg

Santa Maria in Castello is a Romanesque-style, Roman Catholic church located on Via di Porta Castello #35 in Tarquinia, province of Viterbo, region of Lazio, Italy.

This church was built in 1121- 1208 atop the earlier Chapel of Santa Maria ad rupes. It served as Cathedral until 1435, when the role was assigned to the Tarquinia Cathedral. The church fell into disrepair, and underwent restorations.

It has a cosmatesque decoration and a polygonal baptismal font. The presbytery has a ciborium. The façade has three portals and a Lombard-style oculus. The church naves ended in three apses.

== See also ==
- High medieval domes
