= Monastery of San Salvatore, Capo di Ponte =

Monastery in Capo di Ponte, Italy

Coordinates: 46.039444°N 10.353333°E

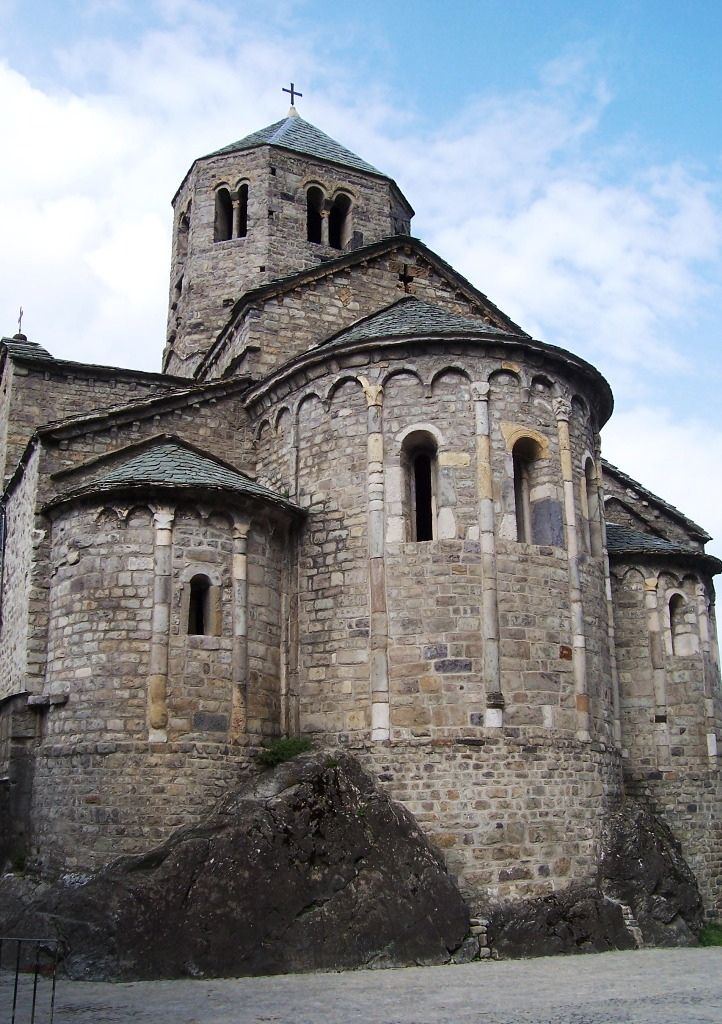
Monastero di San Salvatore

Monastero di San Salvatore (Monastery of San Salvatore) is located on the left bank of the Oglio river, in the municipality of Capo di Ponte in Val Camonica, Italy. Established at the end of the 11th century, it was the first and only Cluniac priory in Val Camonica. The monastery is an important example of early medieval Romanesque architecture.

== Gallery ==
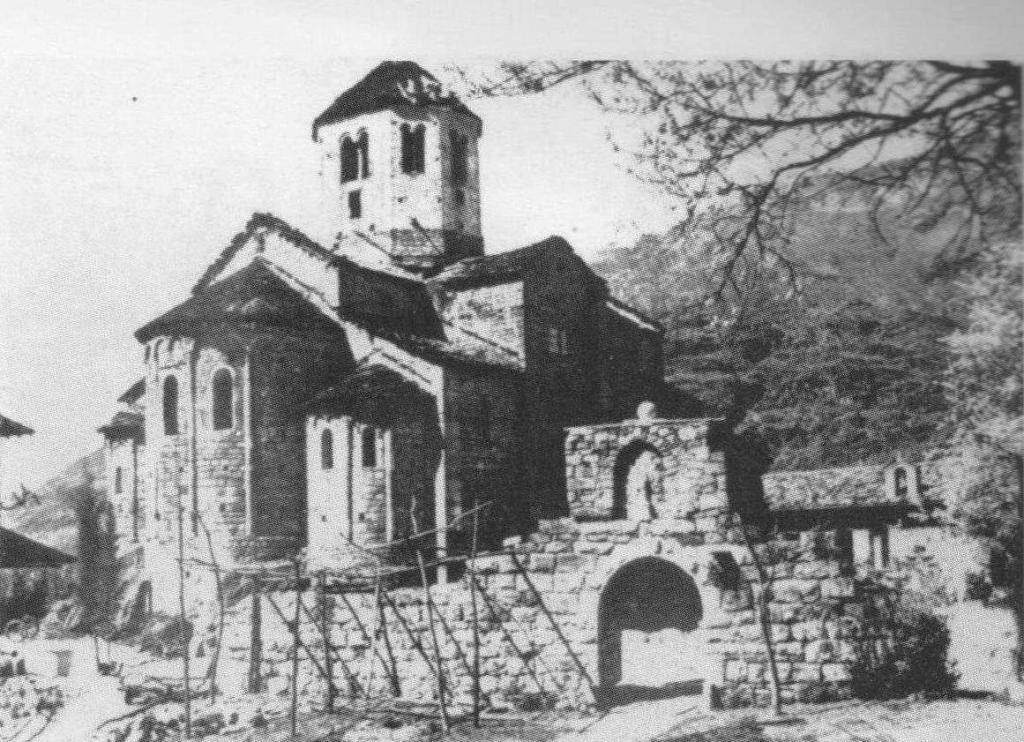
Drawing, 1920

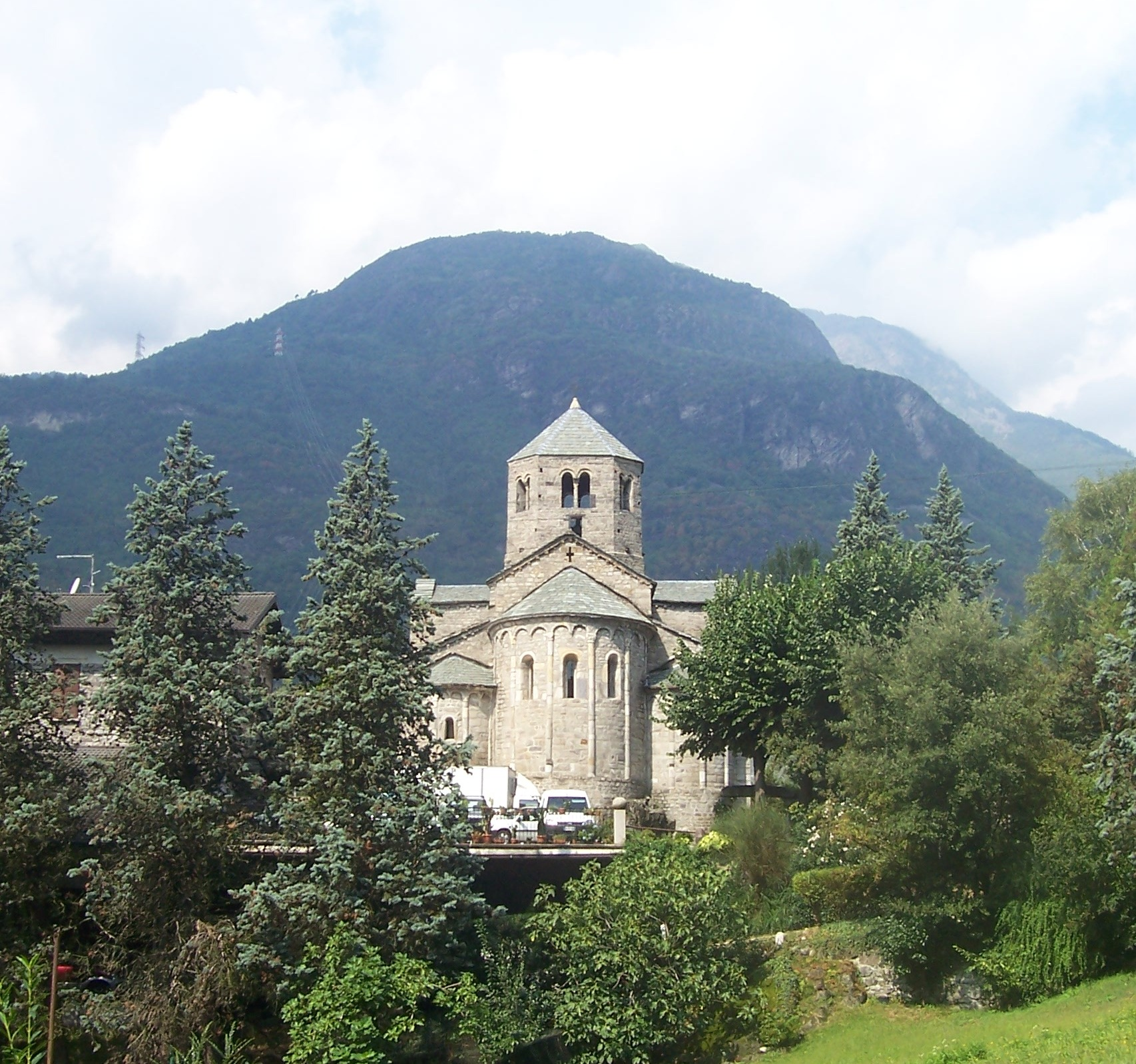
Exterior

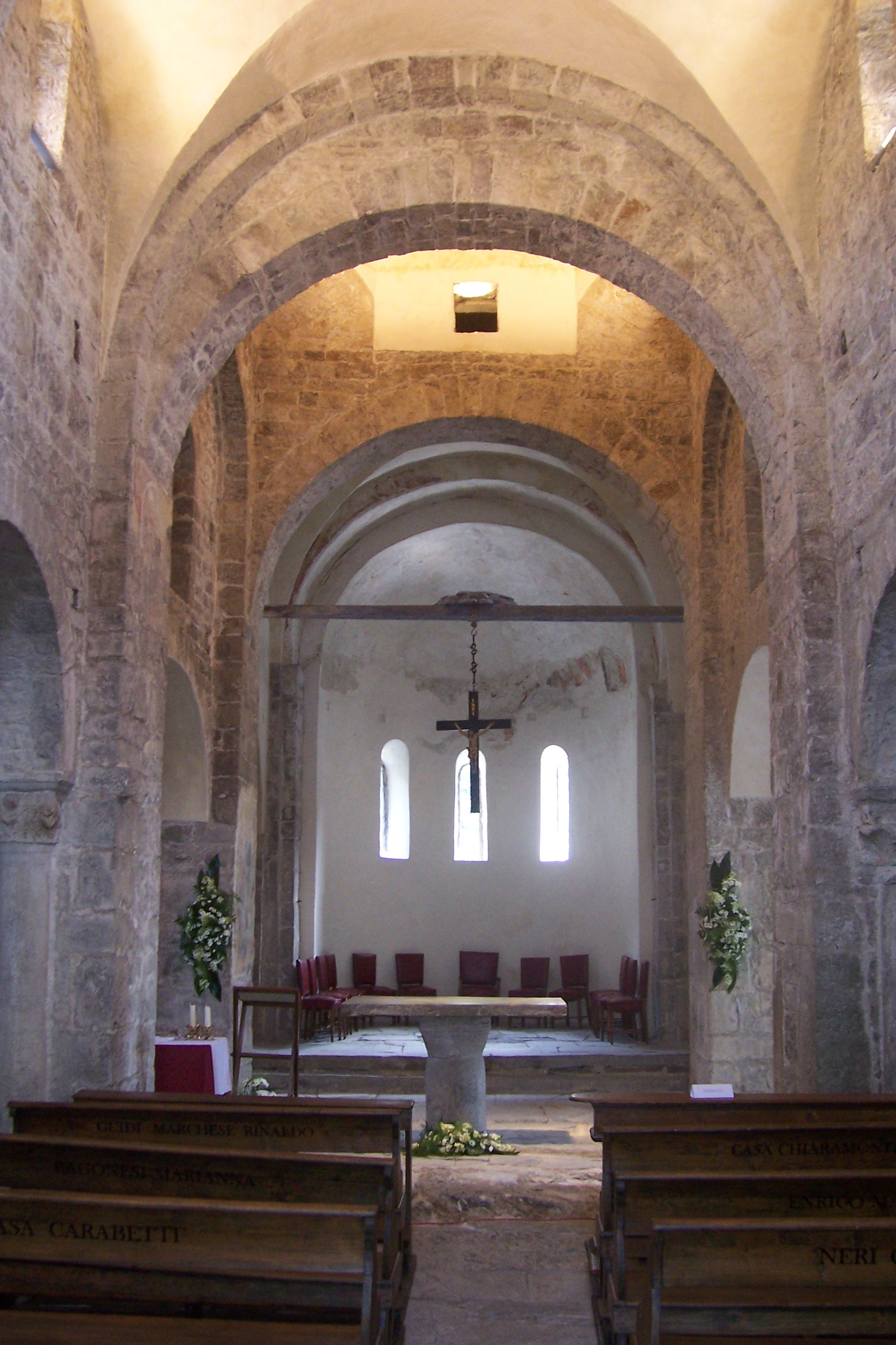
Nave of church towards apse.

== See also ==
- High medieval domes
