= Uzhhorod =

City and administrative center of Zakarpattia Oblast, Ukraine

Uzhhorod Ужгород (Ukrainian) Ungvár (Hungarian) Užhorod (Slovak) Ужгород (Rusyn)
- City
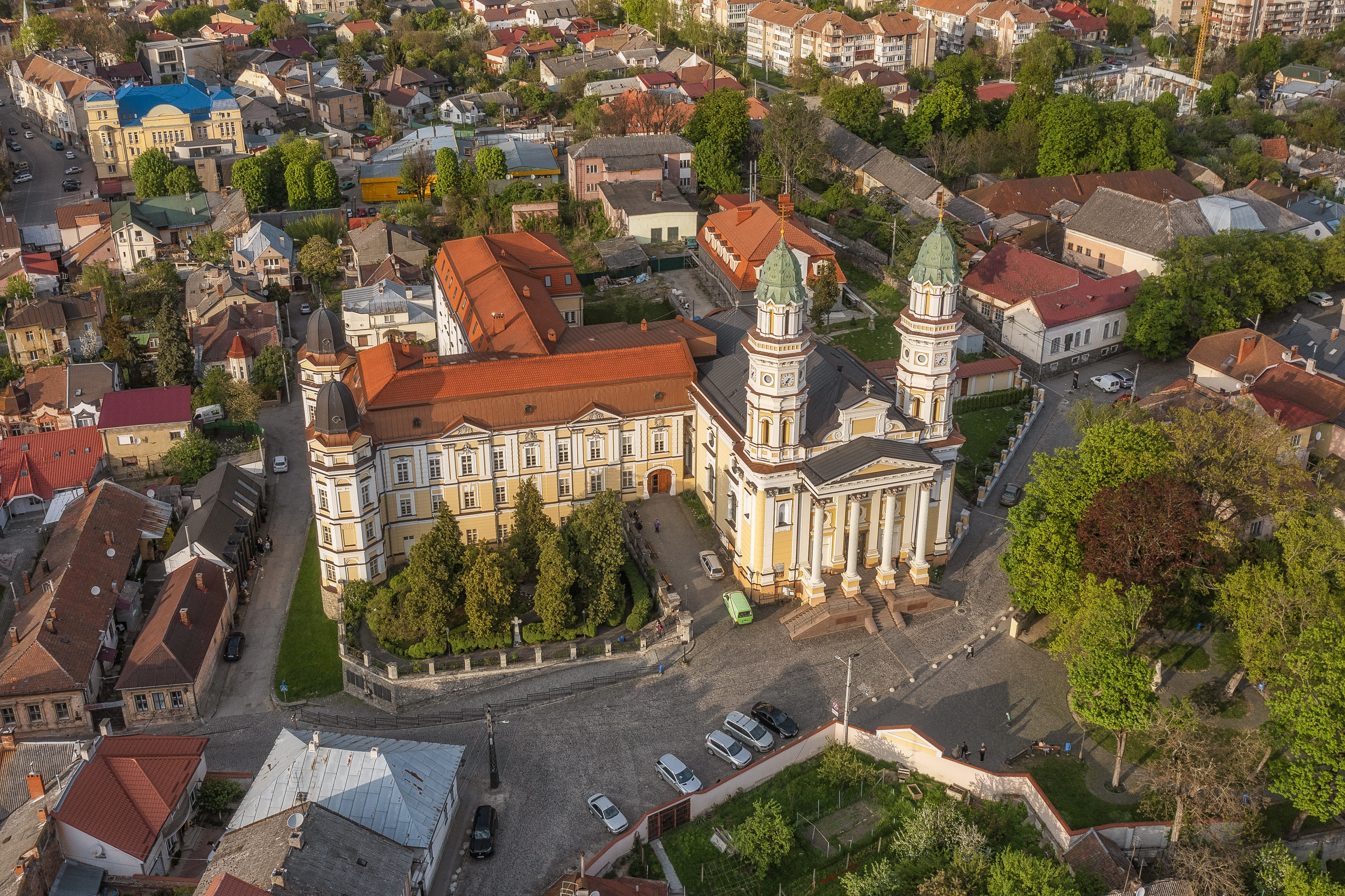
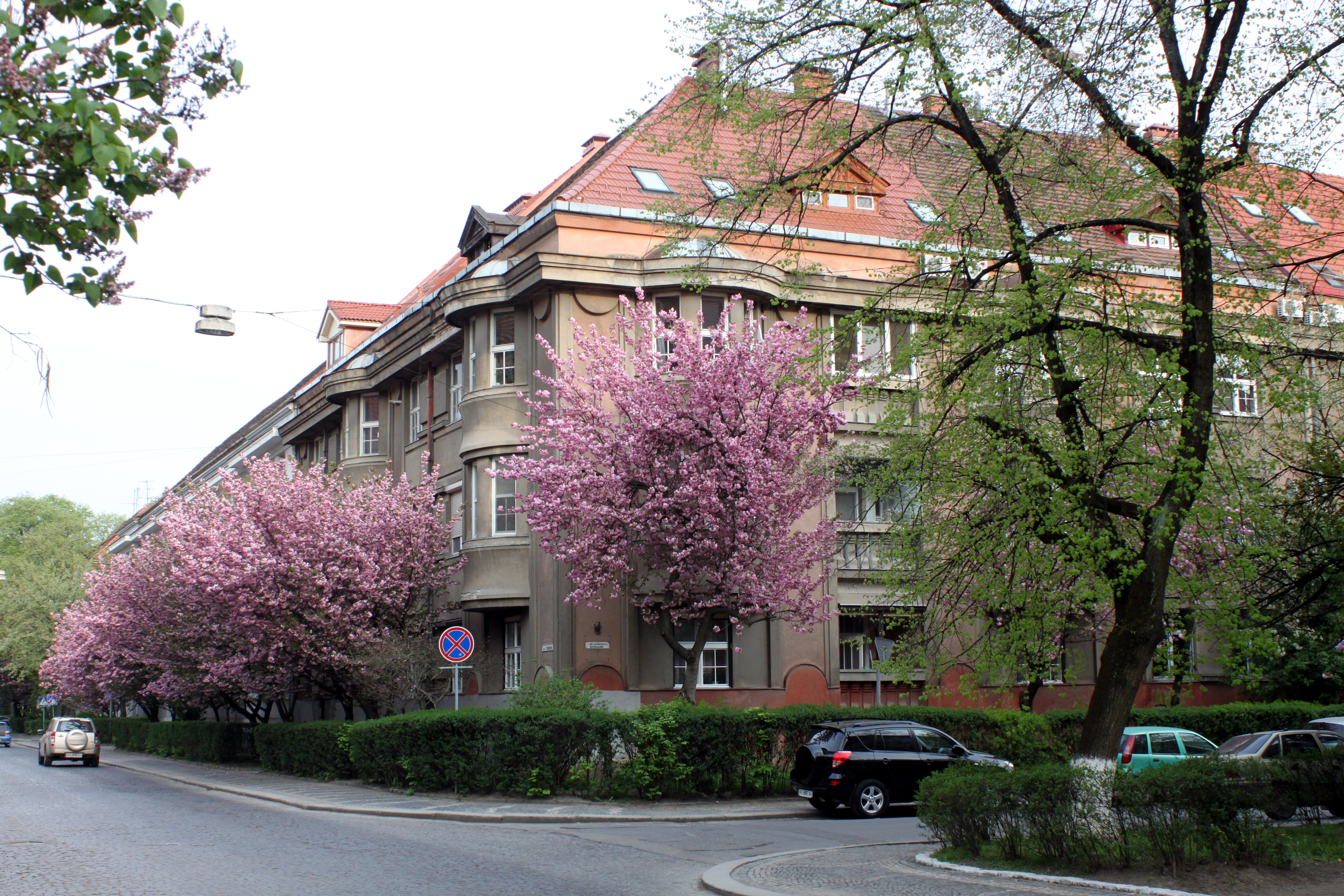
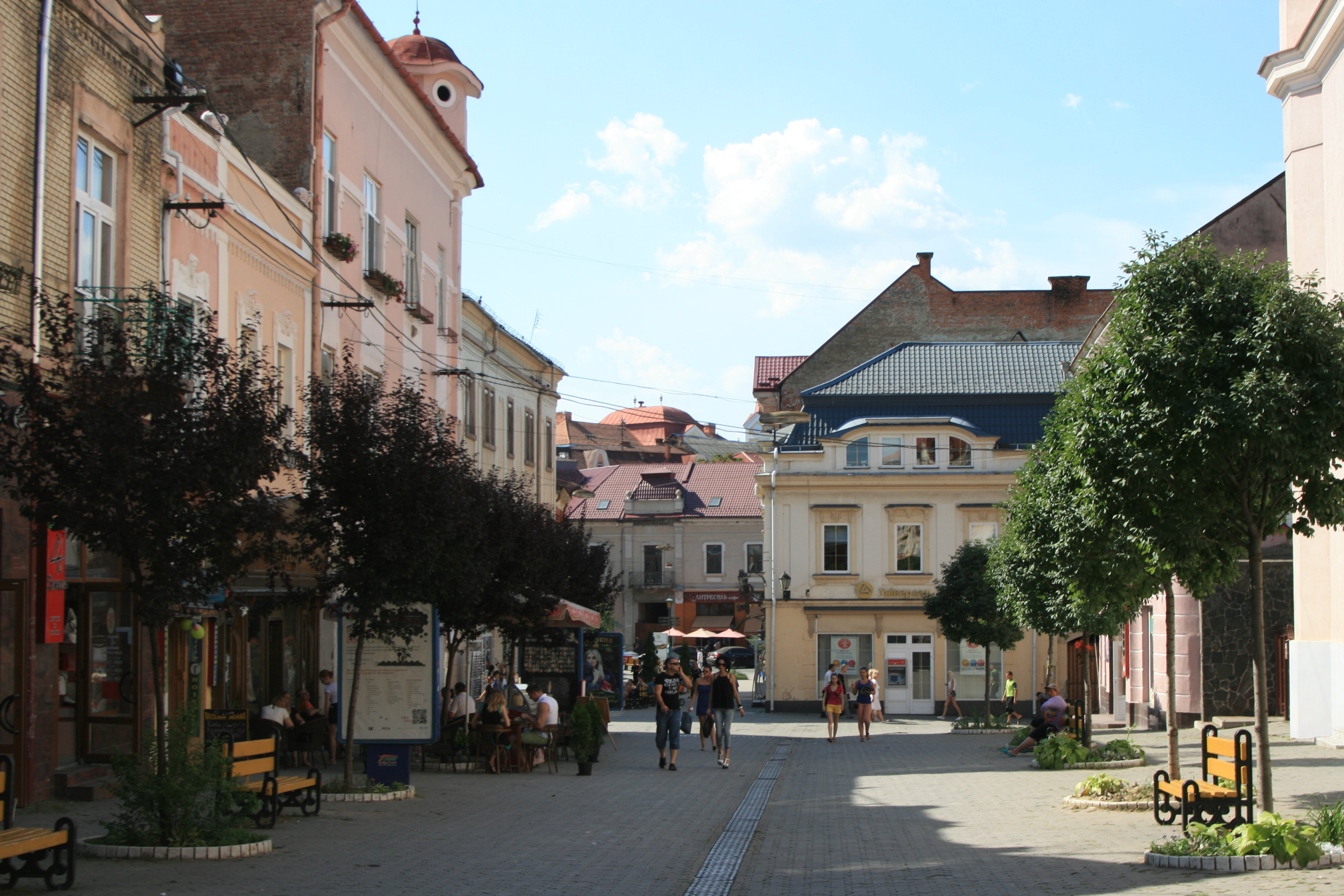
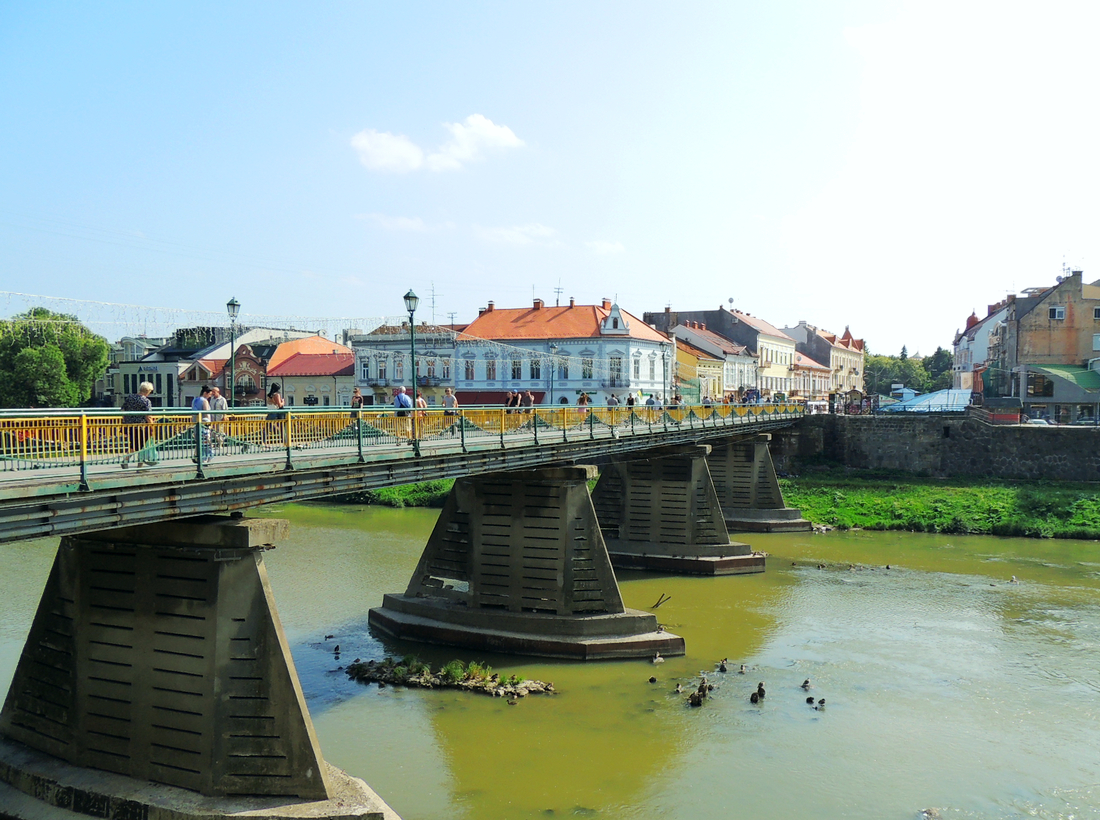
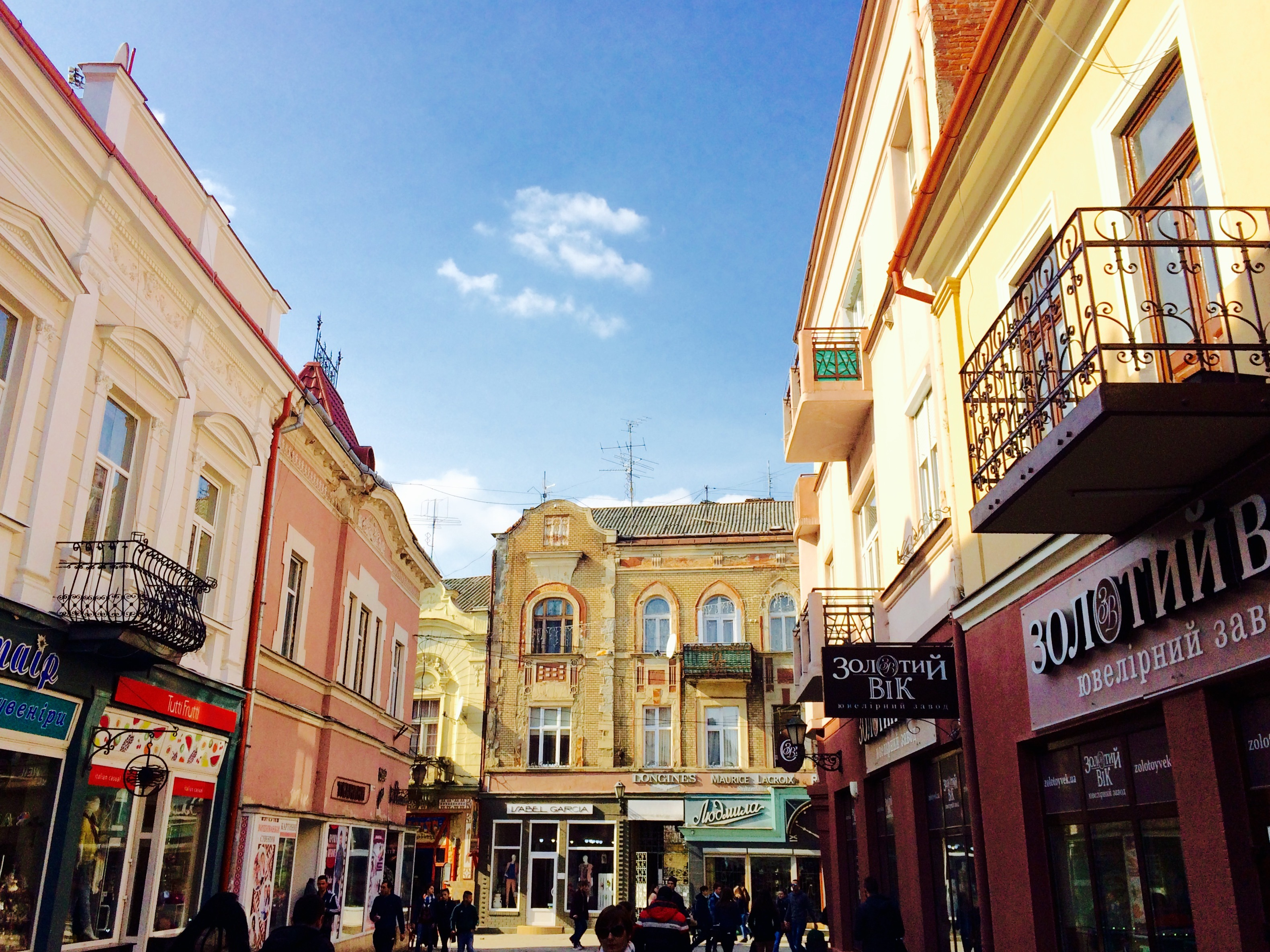
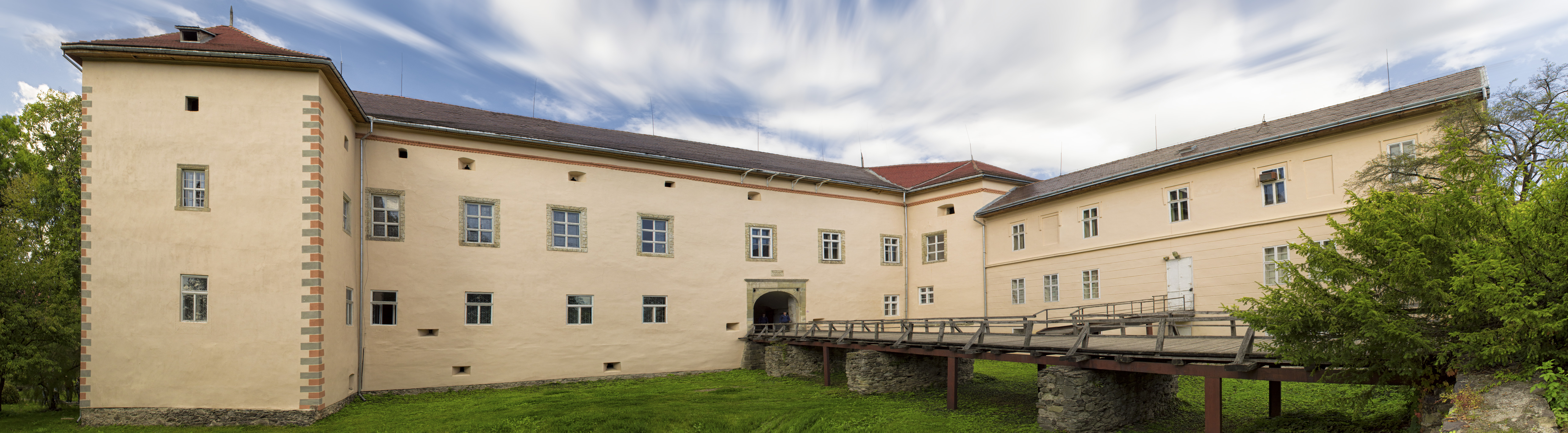
- Holy Cross Cathedral Residential building in Malyi Galagov Voloshyna Street Pedestrian Bridge Theatre Square Uzhhorod Castle

- Flag Coat of arms
- Interactive map of Uzhhorod
- Location of Uzhhorod Uzhhorod (Ukraine)
- Coordinates: 48°37′26″N 22°17′42″E
- Country: Ukraine
- Oblast: Zakarpattia Oblast
- Raion: Uzhhorod Raion
- Hromada: Uzhhorod urban hromada
- Founded: 9th century

Government
  - Mayor: Bohdan Andriiv (self-nominated)

Area
  - Total: 65 km^{2} (25 sq mi)
- Elevation: 169 m (554 ft)

Population (2022)
  - Total: ▲115,449
  - Density: 3,662/km^{2} (9,480/sq mi)
- Time zone: UTC+2 (EET)
  - Summer (DST): UTC+3 (EEST)
- Postal code: 88000
- Area codes: +380-312
- Sister cities: Békéscsaba, Nyíregyháza, Krosno, Trogir, Pula, Corvallis, Darmstadt, Košice
- Climate: Cfb
- Website: rada-uzhgorod.gov.ua

Uzhhorod (Note: Ukrainian: Ужгород, pronounced [ˈuʒɦorod]; Hungarian: Ungvár, pronounced [ˈuŋɡvaːr]; Slovak: Užhorod, Romanian: Ujhorod) is a city on the Uzh River in western Ukraine, on the border with Slovakia and near the border with Hungary. The city is approximately equidistant from the Baltic, the Adriatic and the Black Sea (650–690km) making it the most inland city in this part of Europe. It is the administrative center of Zakarpattia Oblast (region), as well as the administrative center of Uzhhorod Raion (district) within the oblast. Its population is 115,449 (2022 estimate).

== Name ==
The city's earliest known name is Ungvár, from Hungarian Ung (River Uzh) and vár "castle, fortress", originally referring to a castle outside the city (probably Nevytske Castle).

The name Uzhhorod was coined in early 19th century Slavophile circles as a literal translation of the name Ungvár. The city officially adopted this name some time after 1920, under Czechoslovak administration.

The names of the city also include: English: Uzhgorod (before 1996); Rusyn: Ужгород, romanized: Užhorod, Rusyn: Унґвар, romanized: Ungvar (historically); Russian: Ужгород, romanized: Užgorod; Belarusian: Ужгарад, romanized: Užharad; Yiddish: אונגווער, romanized: Ungver, Yiddish: אונגוואַר, romanized: Ungvar; Czech: Užhorod; German: Ungwar, Ungarisch Burg or Ungstadt; Polish: Użhorod; Romanian: Ujhorod.

== History ==
=== Early history ===
==== White-Croat Ungvar (677) ====
The city was founded by early Slavs, one tribe of whom was the White Croats, who settled the area of the modern Uzhhorod under Kuber in the second half of the first millennium AD. The settlement was the center of a new Slavic principality headed by a dynasty descended from Porga's nephew Kubrat. In the 9th century, the fortified castle changed into a fortified early feudal town-settlement which according to Gesta Hungarorum was originally subject to the Old Bulgarian Prince Salan until falling to Laborec, a ruler who was loyal to Great Moravia.

In his 1861 seminal work 'Ungvár története: a legrégibb idöktől maig' (History of Uzhhorod: from ancient times to the present), Hungarian historian Károly Mészáros from Hajdúdorog writes: 'The first inhabitants of Ungvámak, before the city and its region came into the possession of the conquering Hungarians, were Slavs and Ruthenians'.

==== Magyar conquest (895) ====
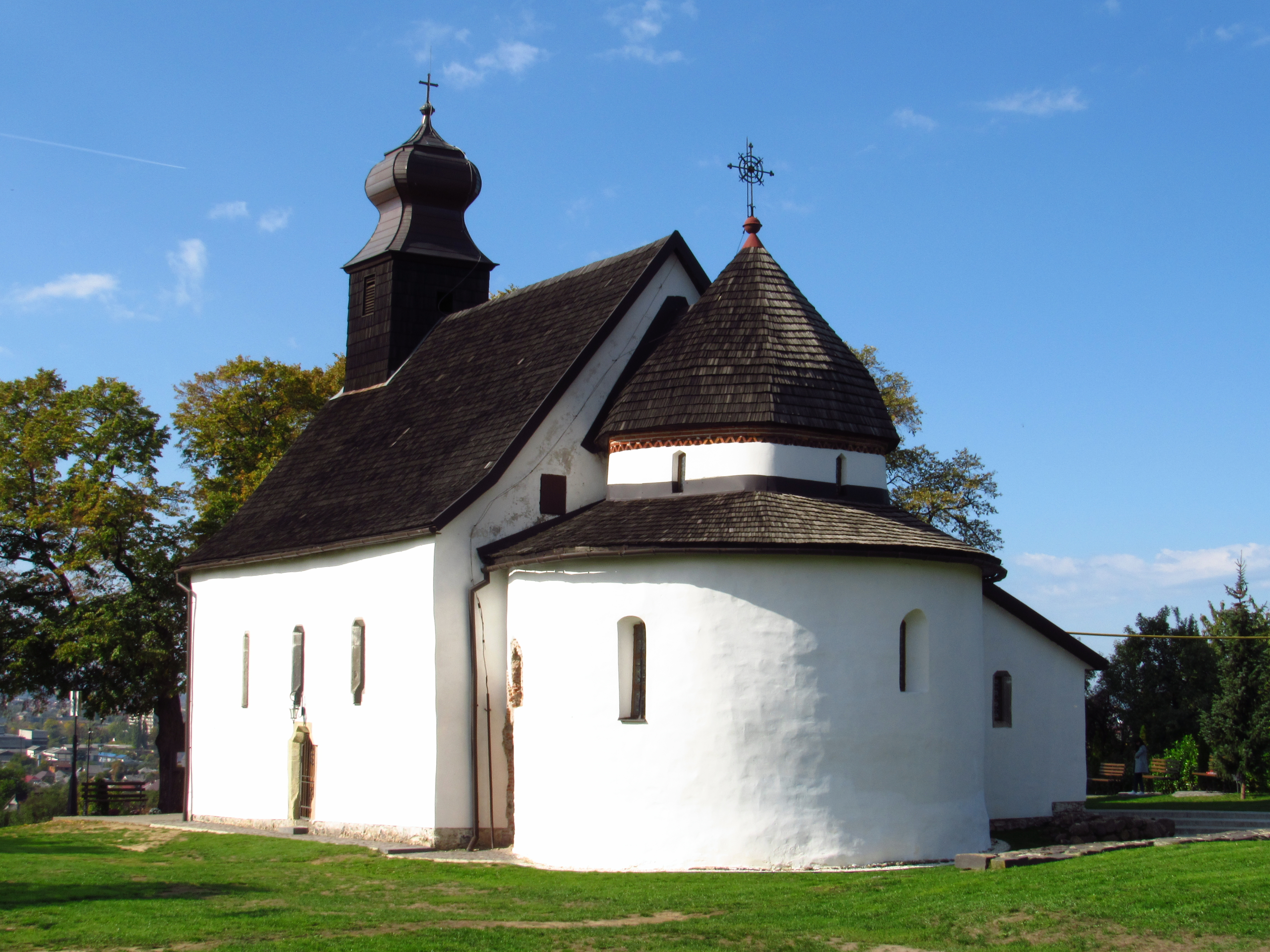
Horiany Rotunda, the oldest building in Uzhhorod

According to the Hungarian medieval chronicle Gesta Hungarorum by Anonymus, the Magyars led by Álmos, Grand Prince of Hungarians, arrived in the region and stormed the – as he called it – 'Hungvar' fortress in 895 AD, then ruled by Laborec. Having taken over the castle, Almos appointed his son Árpád as prince of 'Hungvaria' and from Hungvar his warriors were called Hungarians. As this may be viewed as naive folk etymology by a medieval writer (as magyars were called "ungri" by chroniclers decades before 895), for further information on the ethnonym of the Hungarians see the article Name of Hungary. – In the Kingdom of Hungary, the small town began to extend its borders. King Saint Stephen made it the centre (castrum) of Ung County with a strong military presence to protect the north east border of Hungary. In 1241–1242, the Mongols of Batu Khan burnt the settlement. In 1248 the city was granted town privileges by King Béla IV of Hungary. In the early 14th century, Uzhhorod was involved in the civil wars in the interregnum between Hungarian barons when the dynasty of Árpád died out. Finally Charles I of Hungary from the Anjou dynasty, descendant of the House of Árpád by his mother occupied the throne. The Anjou House also ruled the Kingdom of Naples and the Hungarian king Charles I invited the Drugeths into Hungary and gave the town to them. The Drugeth family became a member of the Hungarian nobility. During that period Philip Drugeth built Uzhhorod Castle. Together with the castle, the city began to grow. From 1430, Uzhhorod became a free royal town.

=== Under Habsburg rule ===
During the 16–17th centuries, the Kingdom of Hungary fell into three parts. The middle was occupied by the Ottoman Empire, the northwest was ruled by the Habsburg dynasty, the eastern part became the Principality of Transylvania, that hold the independent Hungarian statehood. During this period, the city was engaged in the religious and political fight between primarily Hungarian Protestant Transylvania and the German Catholic Austria. Each one wanted to reunite the Kingdom of Hungary under their rule. In 1646 the Union of Ungvár was proclaimed and the Greek-Catholic church was established, in a ceremony held in the Ungvár castle by the Vatican Aegis. In 1707 Ungvár was the residence of Ferenc II Rákóczi, leader of the national liberation war of Hungarians against Habsburgs. From 1780 the city became the capital of the Greek Catholic Eparchy and from 1776 the center of a newly created school district.

The beginning of the 19th century was characterized by economic changes, including the first factories in the city. The greatest influence on Ungvár among the political events of the 19th century was made by the Hungarian Revolution of 1848-1849, during which the native Hungarian nobility sought both to shake off the suzerainty of the Austrian Empire and to have authority over their own people. 27 March 1848 was officially celebrated in the city as the overthrow of the monarchy in Hungary. It is now celebrated in Hungary on 15 March.

In 1872 the first railway line opened, linking the city to the important railway junction of Chop, then known as Csap.

According to the 1910 census, the city had 16,919 inhabitants, of which 13,590 (80.3%) were Magyars, 1,219 (7.2%) Slovaks, 1,151 (6.8%) Germans, 641 (3.8%) Rusyns and 1.6% Czechs. By religion, 5,481 Roman Catholic, 5,305 Jewish, 4,473 Greek Catholic, 1,368 Calvinist. At the same time, the municipal area of the city had a population composed of 10,541 (39.05%) Hungarians, 9,908 (36.71%) Slovaks, and 5,520 (20.45%) Rusyns.

=== During the World Wars ===
The First World War slowed down the tempo of city development. On 10 September 1919, Subcarpathia was officially allocated to the Republic of Czechoslovakia. Uzhhorod became the administrative center of the territory. During these years Uzhhorod developed into an architecturally modern city, with Malyi Galagov, a new government quarter, being built from scratch.

After the First Vienna Award in 1938, Uzhhorod was given back to Hungary from which it was separated after World War I.

In 1941 the Jewish population reached 9,576. On 19 March 1944, German troops entered the city. They established a Judenrat (Jewish council) and set up two ghettos, at the Moskovitz brickyard and Gluck lumberyard. During May 1944, all Jews were deported to Auschwitz in five different transports and subsequently murdered. Only a few hundred Jews survived.

=== Soviet Union ===
On 27 October 1944, the city was captured by the troops of the 4th Ukrainian Front of the Red Army.

This period brought significant changes. On the outskirts of Uzhhorod new enterprises were constructed and old enterprises were renewed. On 29 June 1945, Subcarpathian Ukraine was annexed by the Soviet Union and became a westernmost part of the Ukrainian SSR. This followed the assumption of local authority by the People's Committee of Transcarpathian Ukraine based in Uzhhorod and headed by a local Communist. That year the Uzhhorod State University (now Uzhhorod National University) was also opened. Since January 1946 Uzhhorod was the center of newly formed Zakarpatska oblast.

=== In Ukraine ===
Since 1991, Uzhhorod has been one of 24 regional capitals within independent Ukraine. Of these, Uzhhorod is the smallest and westernmost.

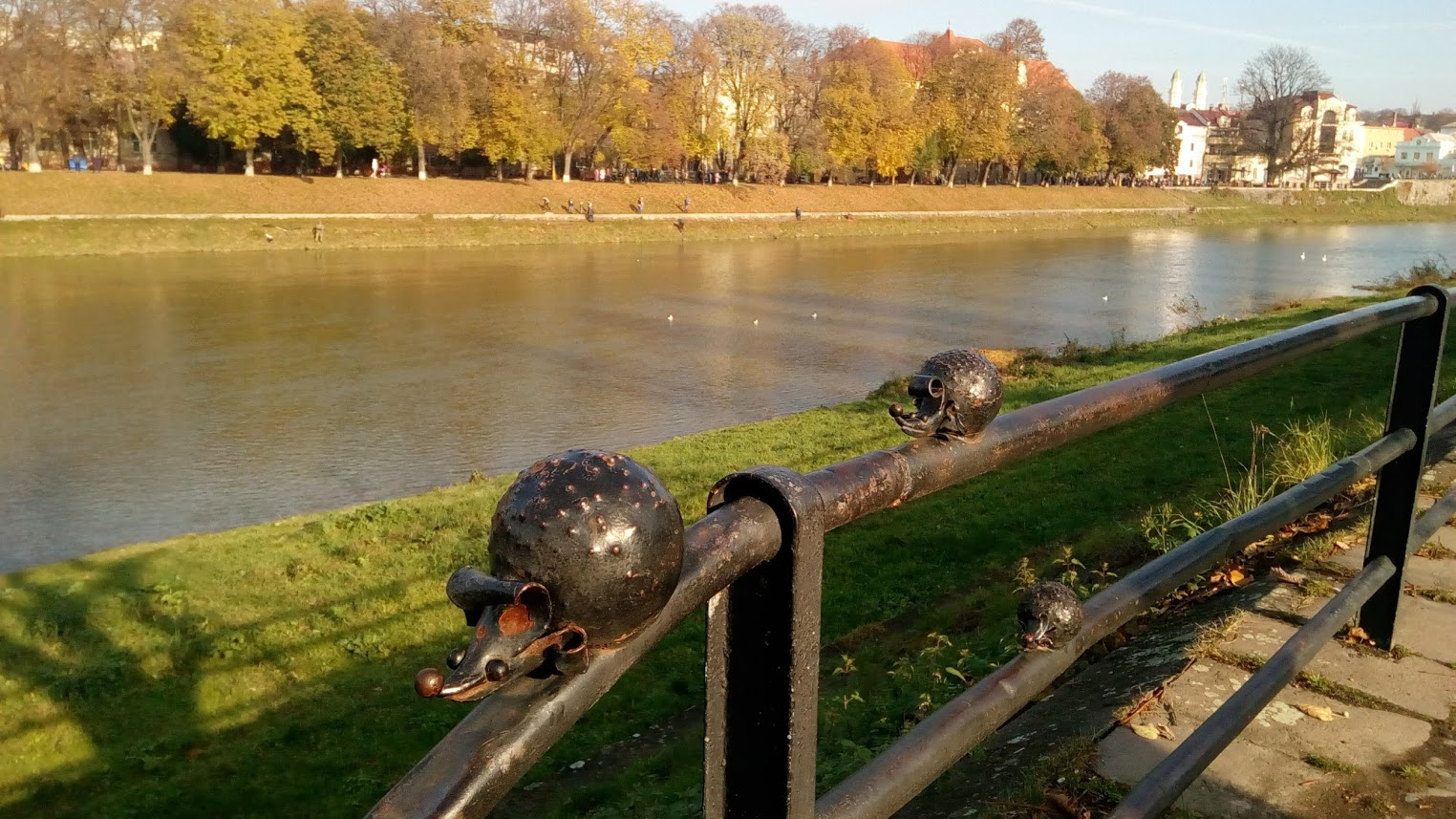
Embankment of the Uzh River

In 2002, a bust of Tomáš Masaryk, Czechoslovakia's first president, was unveiled in a main square of the city. A similar bust was unveiled in 1928 on the 10th anniversary of Czechoslovak independence, but was removed by the Hungarians when they took over the region in 1939.

On 15 April 2022, as part of the derussification campaign that swept through Ukraine following the February 2022 Russian invasion of Ukraine, the Uzhhorod City Council decided to rename 58 streets connected to Russian figures.

== Geography ==
=== Climate ===
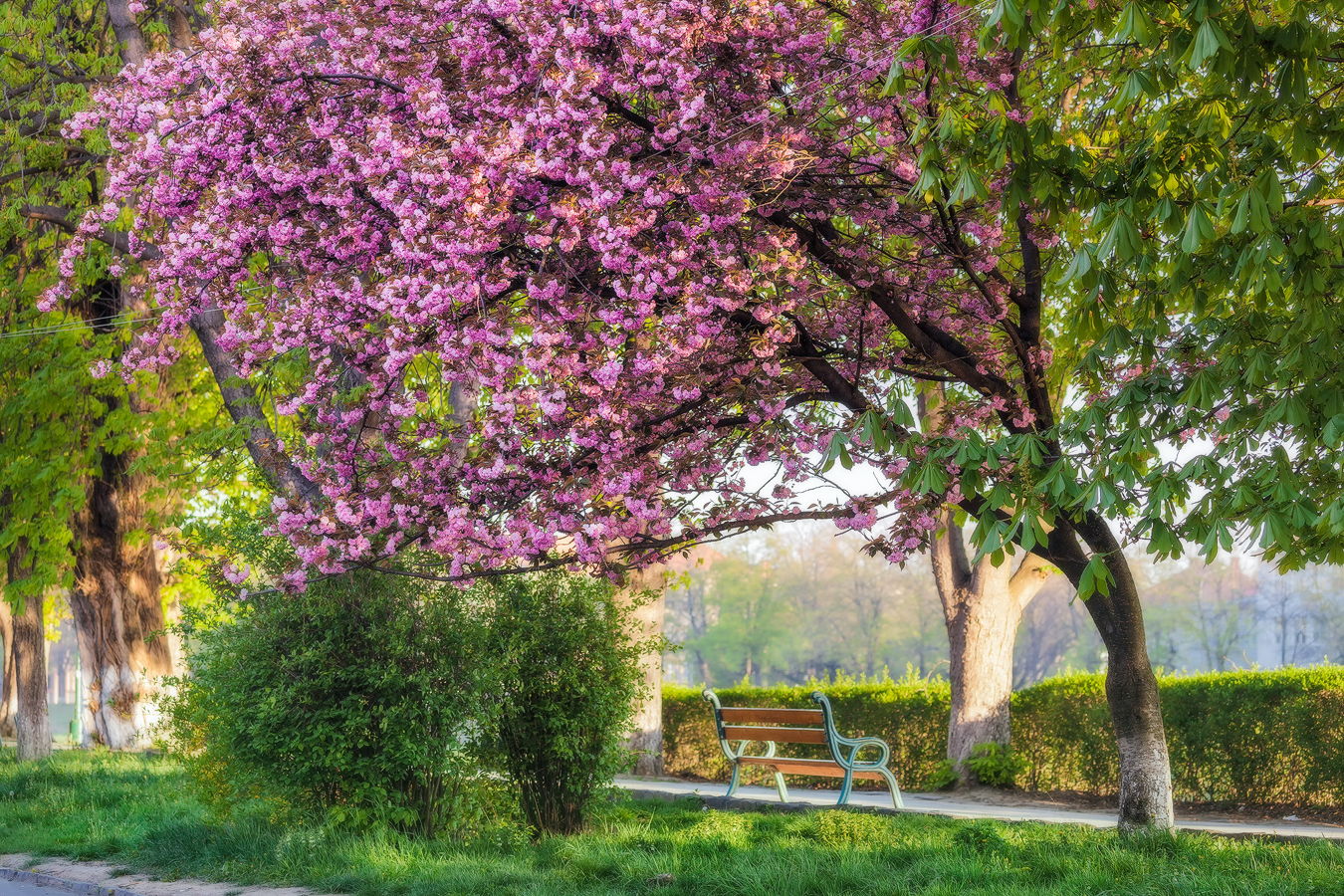
Cherry blossoms in Uzhhorod

Uzhhorod has an Oceanic climate (Köppen: Cfb) with cool to cold winters and warm summers. The coldest month is January with an average temperature of −1.7 °C (28.9 °F) while the warmest month is July with an average temperature of 20.9 °C (69.6 °F). The coldest temperature ever recorded is −28.2 °C (−18.8 °F) and the warmest temperature was 38.6 °C (101.5 °F). Average annual precipitation is 748 millimetres (29.4 in), which is evenly distributed throughout the year though the summer months have higher precipitation. On average, Uzhhorod receives 2133 hours of sunshine per year.

Climate data for Uzhhorod (1991–2020, extremes 1947–present)
Month	Jan	Feb	Mar	Apr	May	Jun	Jul	Aug	Sep	Oct	Nov	Dec	Year
Record high °C (°F)	14.6 (58.3)	19.2 (66.6)	25.4 (77.7)	29.7 (85.5)	33.4 (92.1)	36.8 (98.2)	38.6 (101.5)	38.4 (101.1)	35.9 (96.6)	26.1 (79.0)	23.3 (73.9)	15.6 (60.1)	38.6 (101.5)
Mean daily maximum °C (°F)	1.7 (35.1)	4.3 (39.7)	10.4 (50.7)	17.4 (63.3)	22.1 (71.8)	25.5 (77.9)	27.6 (81.7)	27.7 (81.9)	21.9 (71.4)	15.6 (60.1)	9.2 (48.6)	3.0 (37.4)	15.5 (59.9)
Daily mean °C (°F)	−1.2 (29.8)	0.6 (33.1)	5.4 (41.7)	11.5 (52.7)	16.1 (61.0)	19.6 (67.3)	21.3 (70.3)	21.1 (70.0)	15.9 (60.6)	10.5 (50.9)	5.4 (41.7)	0.3 (32.5)	10.5 (50.9)
Mean daily minimum °C (°F)	−4.2 (24.4)	−3.0 (26.6)	0.8 (33.4)	5.6 (42.1)	10.1 (50.2)	13.7 (56.7)	15.3 (59.5)	14.9 (58.8)	10.4 (50.7)	5.9 (42.6)	1.9 (35.4)	−2.3 (27.9)	5.8 (42.4)
Record low °C (°F)	−28.2 (−18.8)	−26.3 (−15.3)	−17.5 (0.5)	−6.9 (19.6)	−4.4 (24.1)	1.5 (34.7)	5.4 (41.7)	4.4 (39.9)	−2.2 (28.0)	−9.3 (15.3)	−21.8 (−7.2)	−24.7 (−12.5)	−28.2 (−18.8)
Average precipitation mm (inches)	54 (2.1)	53 (2.1)	41 (1.6)	45 (1.8)	69 (2.7)	68 (2.7)	82 (3.2)	67 (2.6)	68 (2.7)	62 (2.4)	58 (2.3)	64 (2.5)	731 (28.8)
Average extreme snow depth cm (inches)	7 (2.8)	7 (2.8)	1 (0.4)	0 (0)	0 (0)	0 (0)	0 (0)	0 (0)	0 (0)	0 (0)	0 (0)	4 (1.6)	7 (2.8)
Average rainy days	11	10	13	15	16	16	15	13	13	13	14	13	162
Average snowy days	14	12	5	1	0.03	0	0	0	0	0.3	5	12	49
Average relative humidity (%)	83.0	76.6	66.3	60.6	65.6	67.7	67.7	67.5	72.1	77.0	81.1	83.6	72.4
Mean monthly sunshine hours	57	86	163	218	270	284	294	291	207	141	77	45	2,133
Source 1: Pogoda.ru.net
Source 2: NOAA (humidity and sun 1991–2020)

== Demographics ==
Historical population
Year	Pop.	±%
1921	20,601	—
1930	26,675	+29.5%
1939	30,000	+12.5%
1959	47,396	+58.0%
1970	64,578	+36.3%
1979	90,995	+40.9%
1989	117,061	+28.6%
2001	117,317	+0.2%
2011	116,423	−0.8%
2022	115,449	−0.8%

According to the Ukrainian 2001 census, the population of Uzhhorod included:

- Ukrainians (including Rusyns) (77.8%)
- Russians (9.6%)
- Hungarians (6.9%)
- Slovaks (2.2%)
- Romani (1.5%)

=== Language ===
Distribution of the population by native language according to the 2001 census:

Language	Number	Percentage
Ukrainian	89 624	77.55%
Russian	14 335	12.40%
Hungarian	8 123	7.03%
Romani	1 494	1.29%
Other or undecided	1 992	1.73%
Total	115 568	100.00 %

According to a survey conducted by the International Republican Institute in April–May 2023, 85% of the city's population spoke Ukrainian at home, 9% spoke Russian, and 1% spoke Hungarian.

== Transportation ==
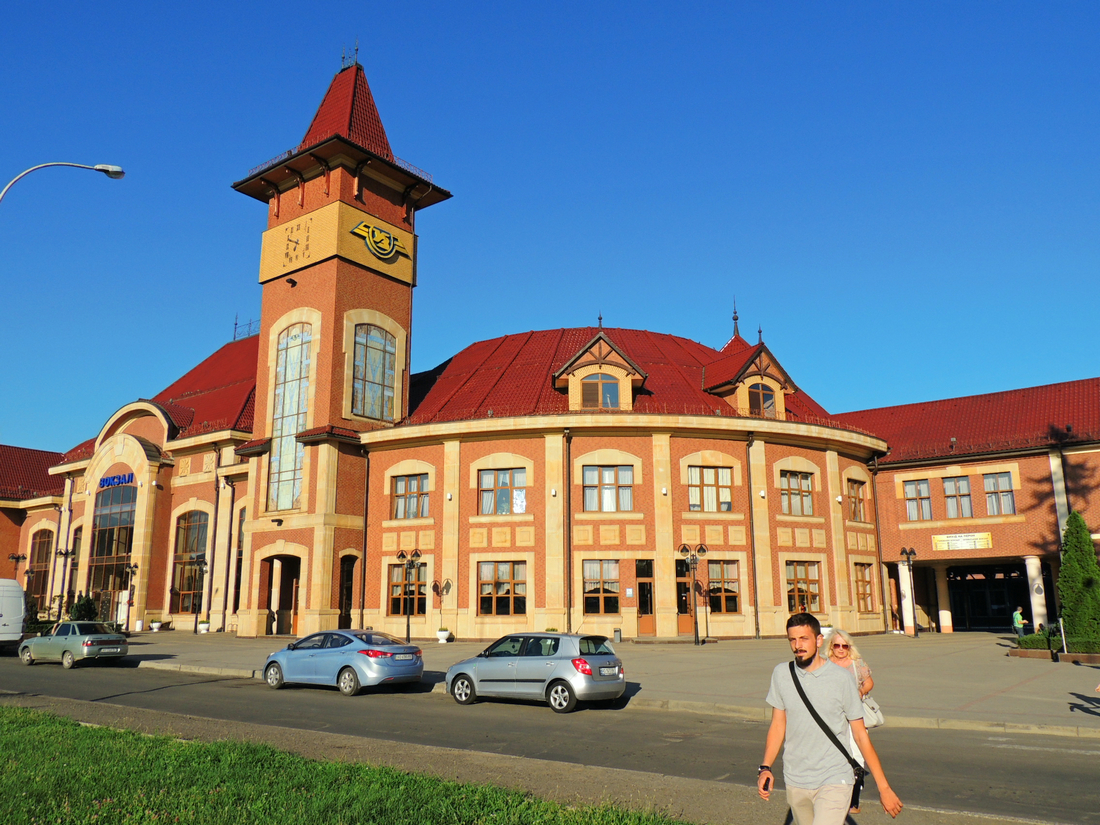
Uzhhorod railway station

The city is served by Uzhhorod railway station and has railway connections with Chop and Lviv. It is also served by Uzhhorod International Airport. The airport is situated near the Ukraine Slovakia border.

== Government ==
The territory of the city of Uzhhorod is coterminous with Uzhhorod urban hromada, one of the hromadas of Ukraine which was established on 12 June 2020.

== Sport ==
The city was home to the SC Rusj Užhorod football club from 1925. Contemporary side FC Hoverla Uzhhorod made their debut in the Ukrainian Premier League in 2001, but dissolved in 2016 due to money issues.

In 2020 professional football matches at the highest levels of Ukraine returned to Uzhhorod in the 2020–21 season due to FC Mynai playing its home matches in the Avanhard Stadium. FC Uzhhorod currently in Ukrainian Second League plays its matches at Avanhard Stadium. Since 2023 FC Metalist Kharkiv plays its home matches in Avanhard Stadium. In July 2025 FC Mynai withdrew from the 2025–26 Ukrainian First League and professional football altogether.

== International relations ==
Uzhhorod is currently twinned with:

- Békéscsaba, Hungary
- Nyíregyháza, Hungary
- Szombathely, Hungary
- Trogir, Croatia
- Pula, Croatia
- (United States) Corvallis, Oregon, US
- Darmstadt, Germany, since 1992
- Košice, Slovakia, since 1993
- Krosno, Poland, since 2008
- Jarosław, Poland, since 2002
- Česká Lípa, Czech Republic
- Satu Mare, Romania
- Târgu Mureș, Romania

== Notable people ==
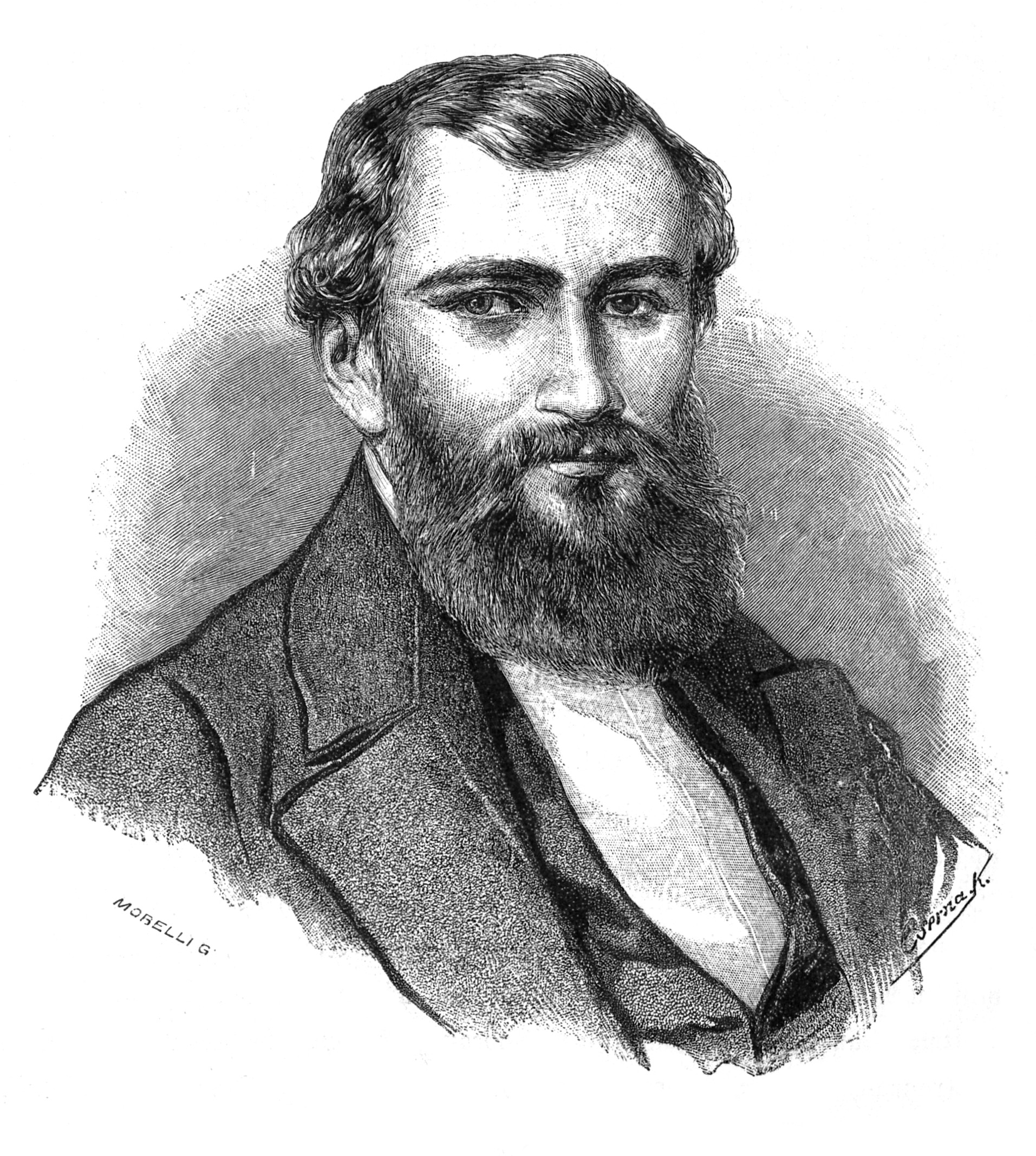
János Erdélyi, c. 1890

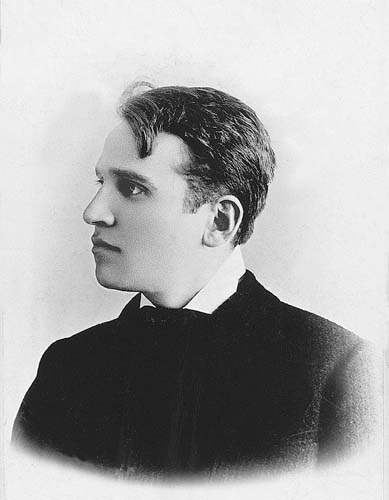
Jenő Janovics, 1901

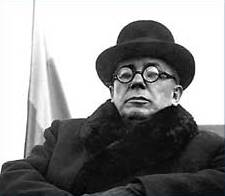
Avgustyn Voloshyn

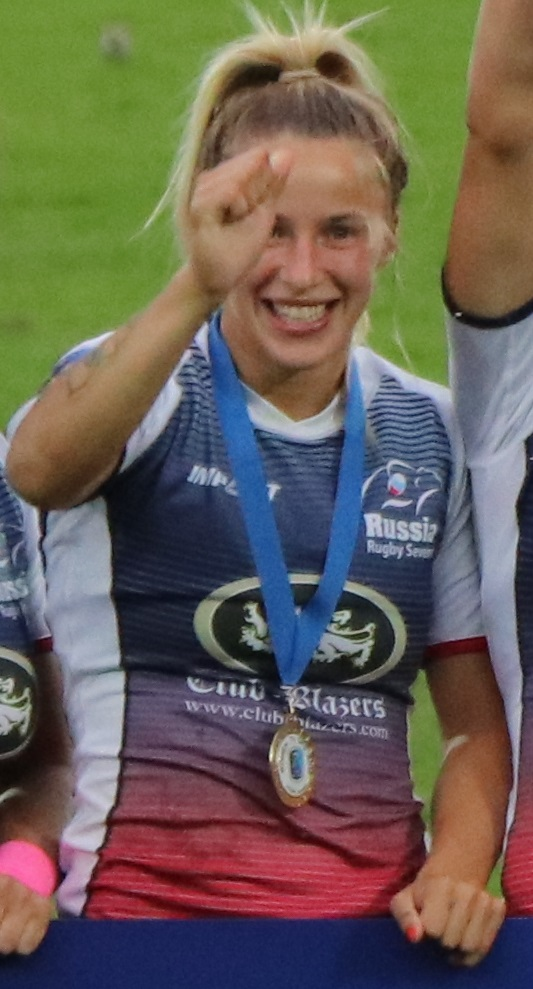
Daria Shestakova, 2018

- Robert Brovdi (born 1975), founder of the Ukrainian military drone unit "Birds of Madyar"
- Arieh Atzmoni (1926–2005) an Israeli soldier rewarded with the Hero of Israel
- János Erdélyi (1814 in Veľké Kapušany – 1868) Hungarian poet, critic, author and philosopher.
- Mihály Fincicky (1842–1916), Hungarian folklorist and mayor
- Renée Firestone (born 1924), Holocaust survivor, fashion designer
- Lisa Fittko (1909–2005) author and helper to many escaping Nazi-occupied France during WWII.
- Wilem Frischmann (born 1931) WWII refugee, became a leading British engineer
- Shlomo Ganzfried (1804–1886), an Orthodox rabbi of Ungvar and posek. Author of the Kitzur Shulchan Aruch
- József Gáti (1885–1945) an ethnic Hungarian communist politician from Subcarpathian Rus
- Jenő Janovics (1872–1945) a Hungarian film director, screenwriter and actor of the silent era.
- Mikhail Kopelman (born 1947), a Russian-American violinist, first violin in the Kopelman Quartet
- Joseph L. Kun (1882–1961), emigrated to the US aged 4, became a judge in Pennsylvania
- Serhiy Kvit (born 1965), a Ukrainian literary critic, journalist, educator and social activist.
- Samuel Lipschütz (1863–1905), a chess player and author
- Nil Lushchak (born 1973) a Ruthenian Catholic hierarch for Mukachevo.
- Jonathan Markovitch (born 1967) a Ukrainian rabbi and the Chief rabbi of Kyiv
- József Örmény (born 1960), a Ukrainian pianist of Hungarian origin.
- Ilka Pálmay (1859–1945), a Hungarian-born singer and actress.
- Géza Pap (1883–1912), socialist from the Austro-Hungarian Empire
- Dezső Pattantyús-Ábrahám (1875–1973) a Hungarian politician from an ancient and noble family
- Serhiy Ratushniak (born 1961) former long-term Mayor of Uzhhorod, 1994–2002 & 2006–2010
- Lika Roman (born 1985), a Ukrainian model, charity worker and Miss Ukraine, 2007
- Zsuzsanna Sirokay (born 1941) a Hungarian pianist, she lives in Switzerland.
- Odarka Sopko (born 1955), a Ukrainian artist and graphic painter.
- Avgustyn Voloshyn (1874 in Kelechyn – 1945), a Subcarpathian politician, teacher and priest
- Yolka (born 1982), singer, songwriter, recording artist, presenter and actress.
- Anatoly Zatin (born 1954), a Mexican composer, pianist and orchestral conductor
- Gregory Zatkovich (1886 in Holubyne – 1967), an American lawyer and first governor of Carpathian Ruthenia
- Paul Zatkovich (1852—1916) newspaper editor and cultural activist for Rusyns in the US.

=== Sport ===
- Matviy Bobal (born 1984) a Ukrainian football forward with ca. 300 club caps
- Juraj Demeč (born 1945) a Czechoslovak former track and field athlete who competed at the 1972 Summer Olympics
- Vladimir Koman (born 1989), a footballer with nearly 300 club caps and 36 for Hungary
- Vladyslav Mykulyak (born 1984) a Ukrainian retired footballer with 320 club caps.
- Yozhef Sabo (born 1940), a former football player with 347 club caps and 76 for the Soviet Union
- György Sándor (born 1984) a Carpathian Ruthenian footballer with 370 club caps and 9 for Hungary
- István Sándor (born 1986) a Hungarian footballer with 380 club caps
- Daria Shestakova (born 1996) a Russian rugby sevens player.
- Tetyana Trehubová (born 1989) a Ukrainian-born Slovak handball player.

== See also ==
- Bridges in Uzhhorod
- Uzhhorod Synagogue
- Zakarpattia Oblast
