= Bridges in Uzhhorod =

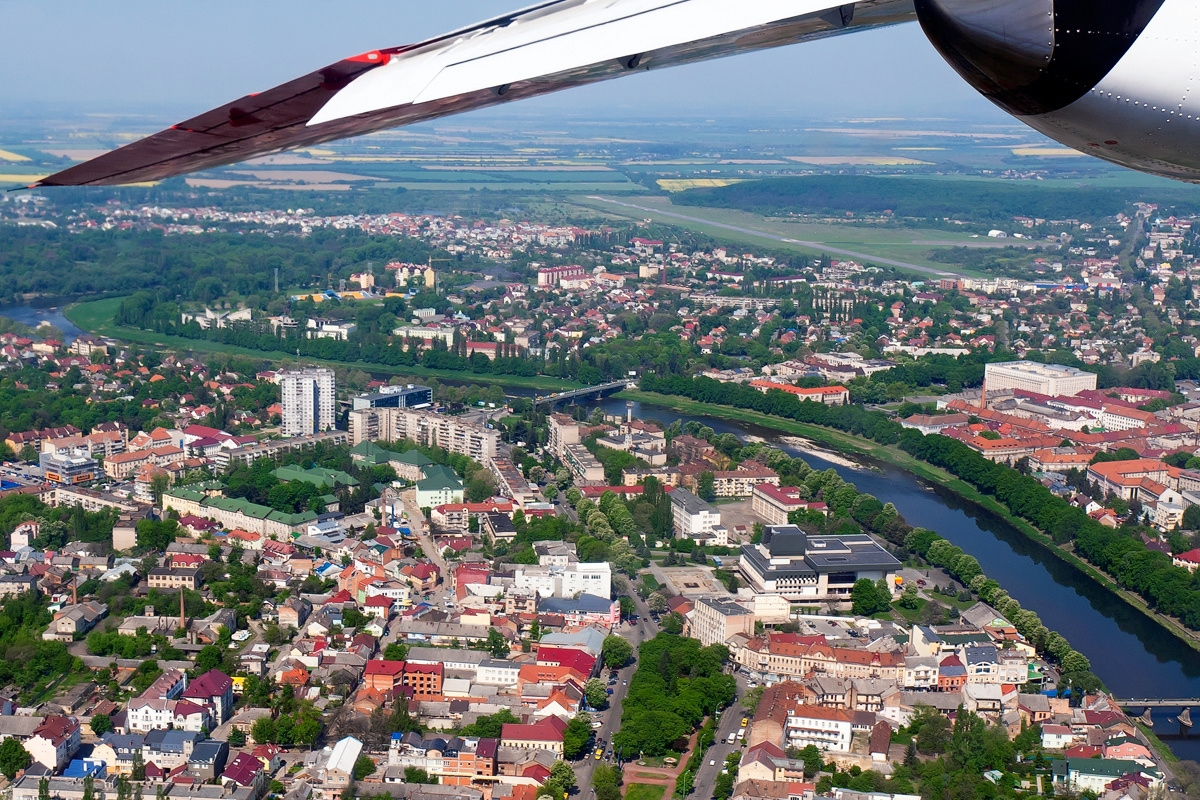
In the center of photo is seen the Great Bridge, at bottom right – the pedestrian. At bottom is seen the green ploshcha Sándora Petőfi.

Uzhhorod in Ukraine, historically situated on the right bank of the Uzh River, now covers both banks of the river. Additionally, there is a small canal that re-enters the river as it enters the city. Currently there are seven bridges spanning the river and a few more across the canal.

== History ==
The first bridges of Uzhhorod are mentioned in chronicles from 1631 and 1690. Until the Middle Ages, people crossed the Uzh River by fording or riding ferries.

The main city bridge is called Tomas Masaryk Bridge (or the Great Bridge) that was built in 1930s and connects ploshcha Druzhby Narodiv (Friendship of Nations Square) on the right bank with ploshcha Bohdana Khmelnytskoho (Bohdan Khmelnytsky Square) on the left bank. The construction of the bridge started in 1934 and cost 8 million Czechoslovak koruna. Measuring 140 metres (460 ft) in length, it was opened in 1937 during the visit of Czechoslovak president Edvard Beneš to Uzhhorod. The bridge was named after Tomas Masaryk, on a decision that was adapted back in 1930. With the occupation of Uzhhorod by the Hungarian troops in 1938, the bridge was stripped of its name and was called simply as Great Bridge. That name stayed until after fall of the Soviet Union. In October 1944, the withdrawing Hungarian and German forces blown almost all the bridges in Uzhhorod into air. After World War II, the Great Bridge as the others were rebuilt by Bosnian-born German Engineer Janos (Hans) Schlesinger. After moving to the Soviet Union Schlesinger adopted Russian name Ivan under which he was buried.

Beside the Great Bridge, Uzhhorod has another no less important bridge connecting the city's Teatralna ploshcha (Theatric Square) and ploshcha Sándora Petőfi (Sándor Petőfi Square). The bridge existed as wooden until the great city flood of 1893 which destroyed it. Yet it was relatively quickly rebuilt as iron bridge in 1896-1897. In 1921, over the bridge stretched a bus route of the first city bus. The bridge also was destroyed during World War II. It was quickly replaced by Red Army with a pontoon bridge becoming the only active road bridge in the city with another rail bridge not far up the stream. Later it was replaced with a temporary wooden bridge structure, until finally Schlesinger built the current 90-metre-long (300 ft) bridge which became exclusively pedestrian and one of the city's landmarks.

== Gallery ==
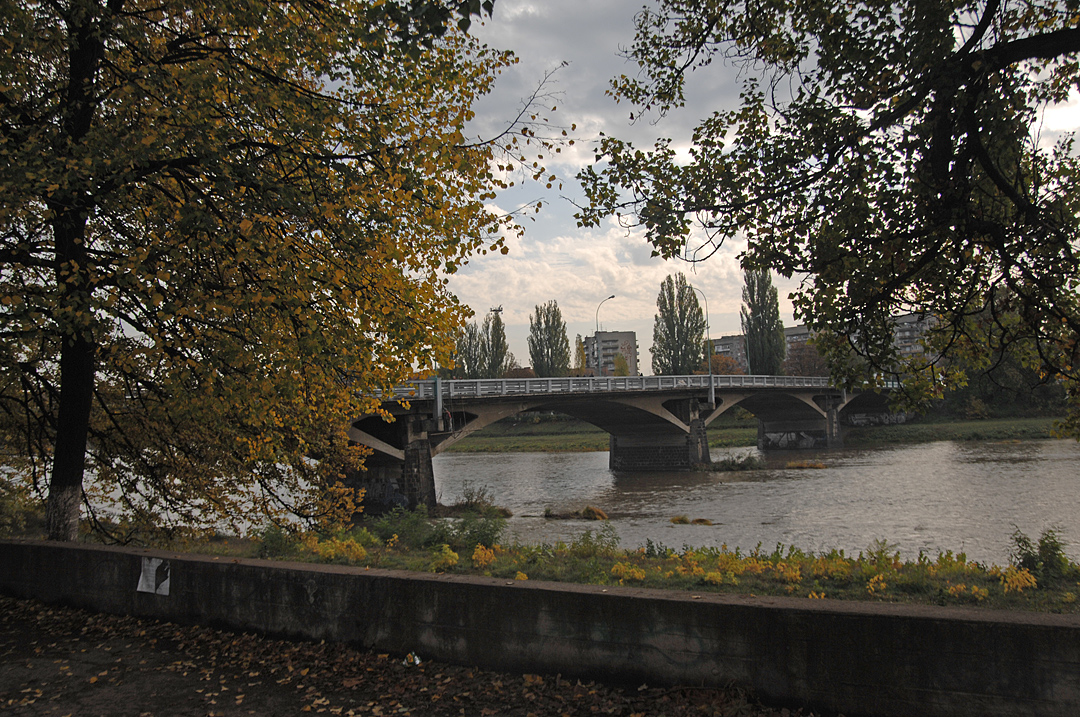
Tomas Masaryk (Great) Bridge

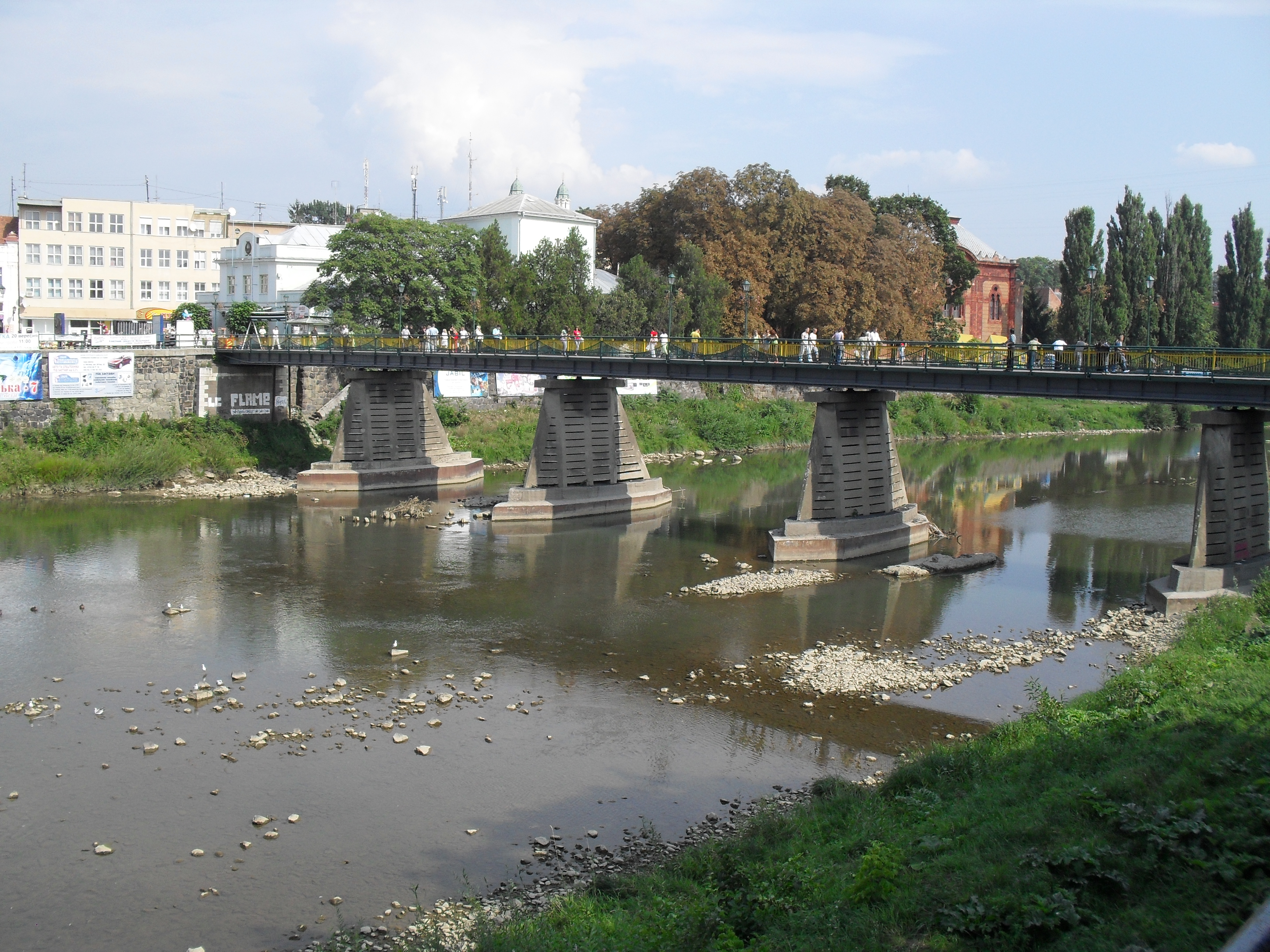
Pedestrian bridge

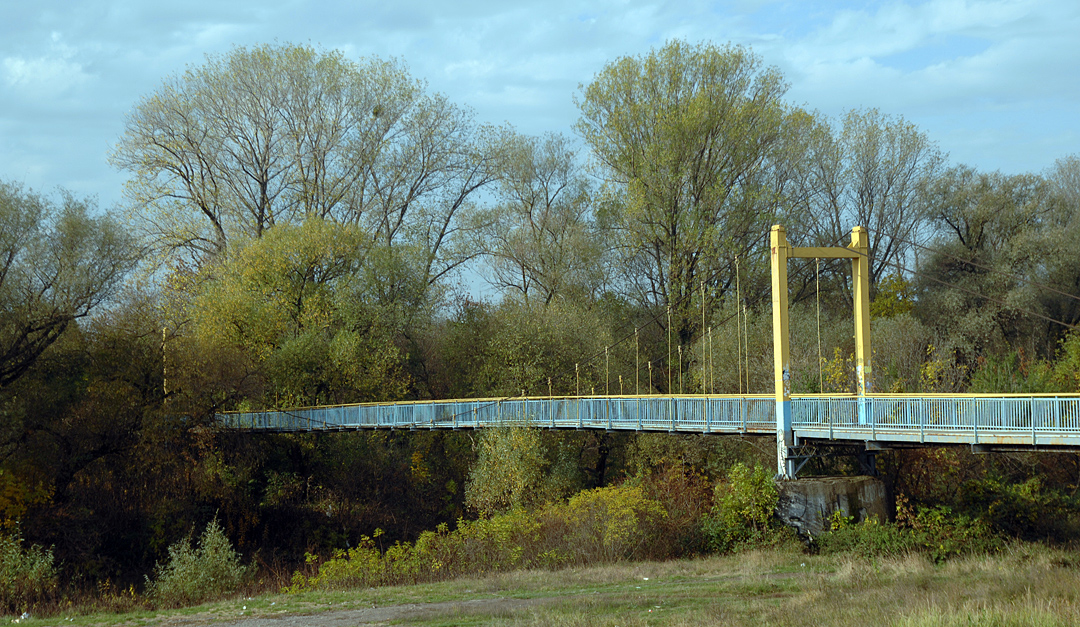
Bridge between Avanhard Stadium and Bozdos Park

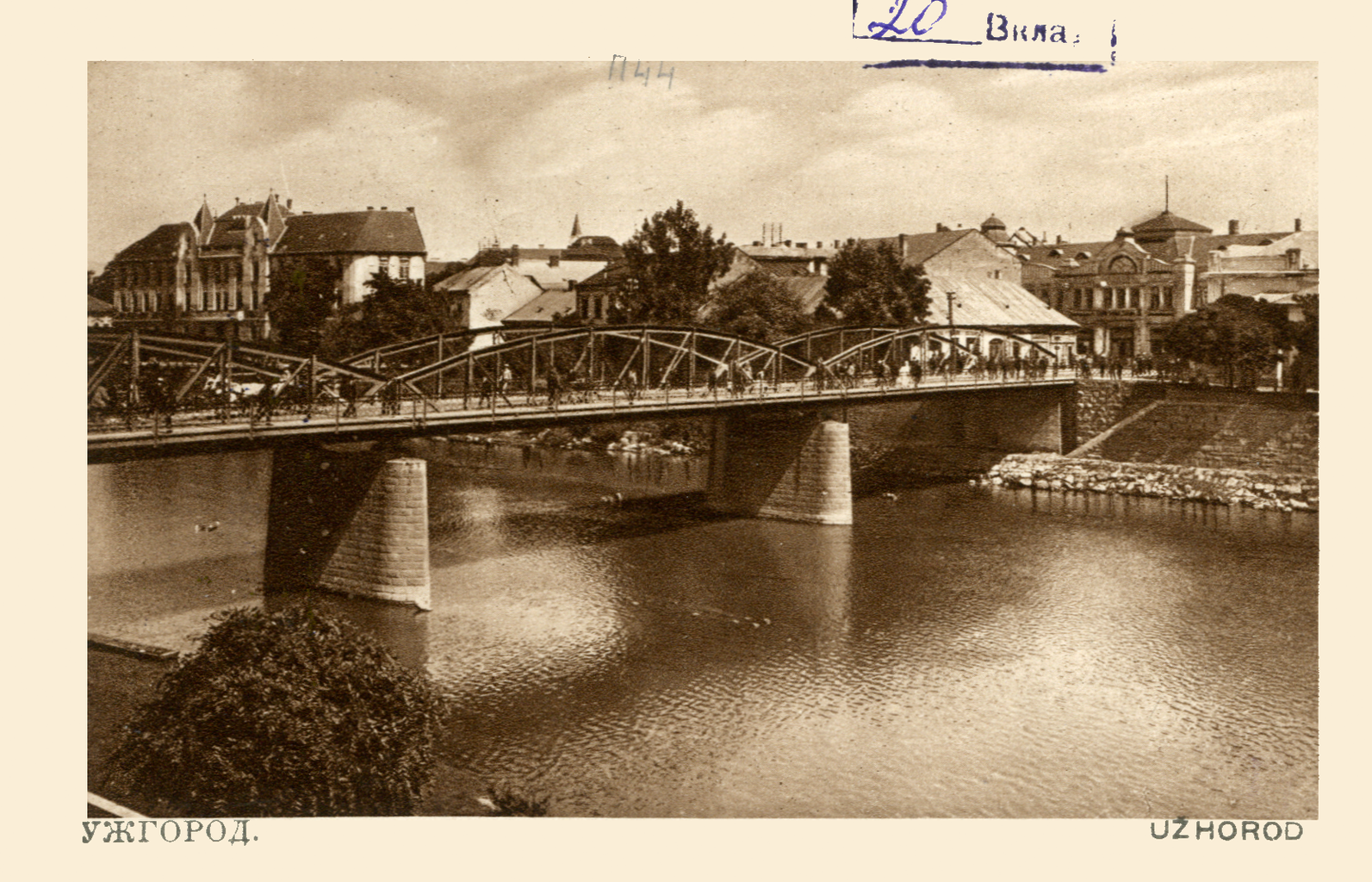
The pedestrian bridge before World War II
