= Horiany Rotunda =

St. Anne Rotunda in Horiany
- Горянська ротонда Св. Анни
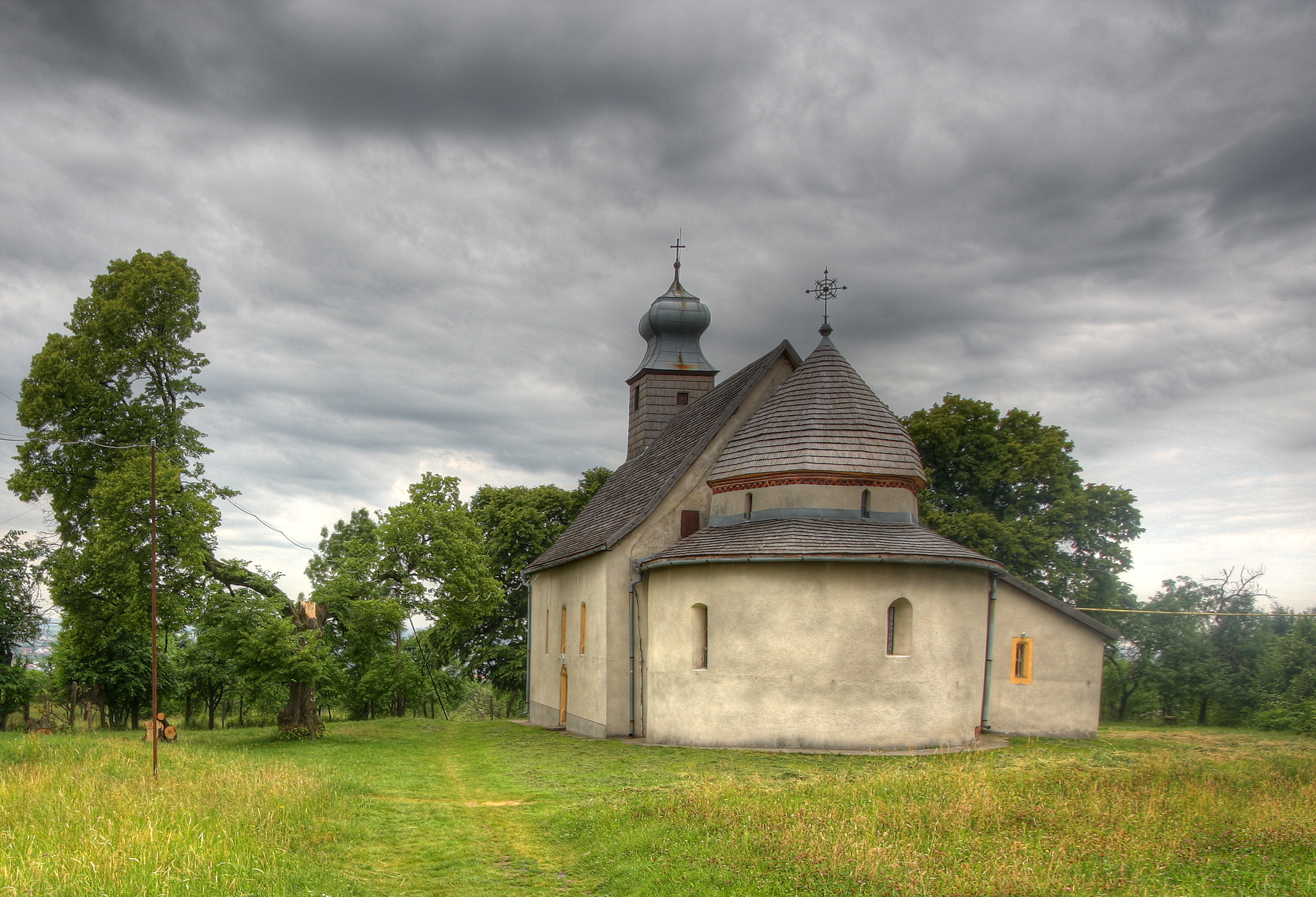
- The rotunda in 2009
- St. Anne Rotunda in Horiany
- 48°36′22.40″N 22°20′13.24″E
- Location: Uzhhorod, Zakarpattia Oblast
- Address: 2 Muzeinyi Lane
- Country: Ukraine
- Denomination: Ruthenian Greek Catholic Church
- Website: https://mgce.uz.ua/parafiya-pokrova-presvyatoyi-bogorodyczi/

History
- Dedication: Saint Anne
- Other dedication: Intercession of the Theotokos

Architecture
- Architectural type: Rotunda
- Completed: 10th–13th centuries

Immovable Monument of National Significance of Ukraine
- Official name: Ротонда (Rotunda)
- Type: Architecture
- Reference no.: 070051

The Horiany Rotunda (Ukrainian: Горянська ротонда; Rusyn: Горянська ротунда) is a rotunda church located on a hill in the Horiany neighborhood of Uzhhorod, Ukraine. The exact origin and age of the building have still not been established. It is often considered to be the oldest building of Zakarpattia Oblast. The original rotunda was expanded in the 14th century with the addition of a Gothic nave.

== History ==
The study of the rotunda began at the beginning of the 20th century, when similar scientific explanations about round churches covered the historical schools of Europe. The Church of St. Anne in Horiany also came into the field of view of researchers. It was at this time that Transcarpathia was part of the Austro-Hungarian Empire, so its first researchers were Hungarian scientists. After the restoration of the church that was carried out in 1911, the scientists of that time were able to see the material from which the walls of the rotunda were built. The similarity of the construction material with the material of the castle Romanesque walls led them to one conclusion: the Horiany church belongs to the 10th–11th centuries.

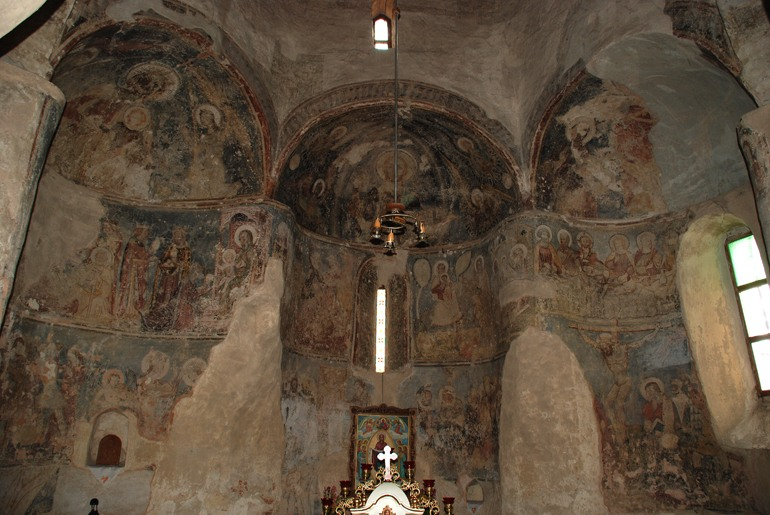
Frescoes

However, with the transition of the region to the Czechoslovak Republic, in which the historical school stood at a height thanks to state support, research on the rotunda gained even greater momentum. In 1921, a publication by researcher M. Novakivsky was published, which claimed Byzantine influence on the architectural style of the church. Another historian Florian Zapletal attributed the construction time to the 14th century, and the builder, according to the researcher, could have been the Podillia prince Koriatovych. Historian I. Kral attributed the Church of St. Anne to the architectural structures of the 9th century of the Great Moravian state. The writer V. Pachovsky claimed that the rotunda was built in the style of churches from Galicia, because it is known that the foundations of similar rotundas were found in Galicia, Volodymyr and Chełm. The researcher of European culture V. Zalozetsky searched for a comparative style of round churches in the Balkans, where there are many Romanesque rotundas of the 11th–12th centuries. Another researcher of church architecture Volodymyr Sichynskyi, after generalizing research, came to the conclusion that the rotunda belongs to the 10th century, and was built by Slavic builders under the influence of the Byzantine architectural school. Sichynskyi was probably the first to pay attention to the building material and masonry of the ancient church.

A new stage of research began in the Soviet period. One of the first researchers was Hryhoriy Lohvyn, who attributed the time of construction of the rotunda to the 13th century, and noted in his work that, apparently, architects from Galicia participated in its construction. But the Transcarpathian historian P. Sova proves a new idea about the construction of the round church in the 12th century, by monks of the Order of St. Paul. In the late 1960s, Hungarian researchers (V. Gerves-Molnar) became especially interested in the rotundas of Pannonia. They conducted generalizing studies and came to the conclusion that the Horiany Rotunda has close "relatives" among the two rotundas in the Hungarian villages of Kiszombor and Korcso. The same geometric shapes, building material, all this led to the idea of combining these three churches into one architectural series and dating its construction to the 11th century.

Nowadays, the Horiany Church of the Intercession of the Theotokos (recently renamed) is a hexagonal structure, with six semicircular niches with three windows cut into the thickness of the walls, and a light vestibule with six windows on top of the structure. Of interest are the interior walls that were painted in the 14th century by artists in the style of the Italian Proto-Renaissance school of Giotto.

== Gallery ==
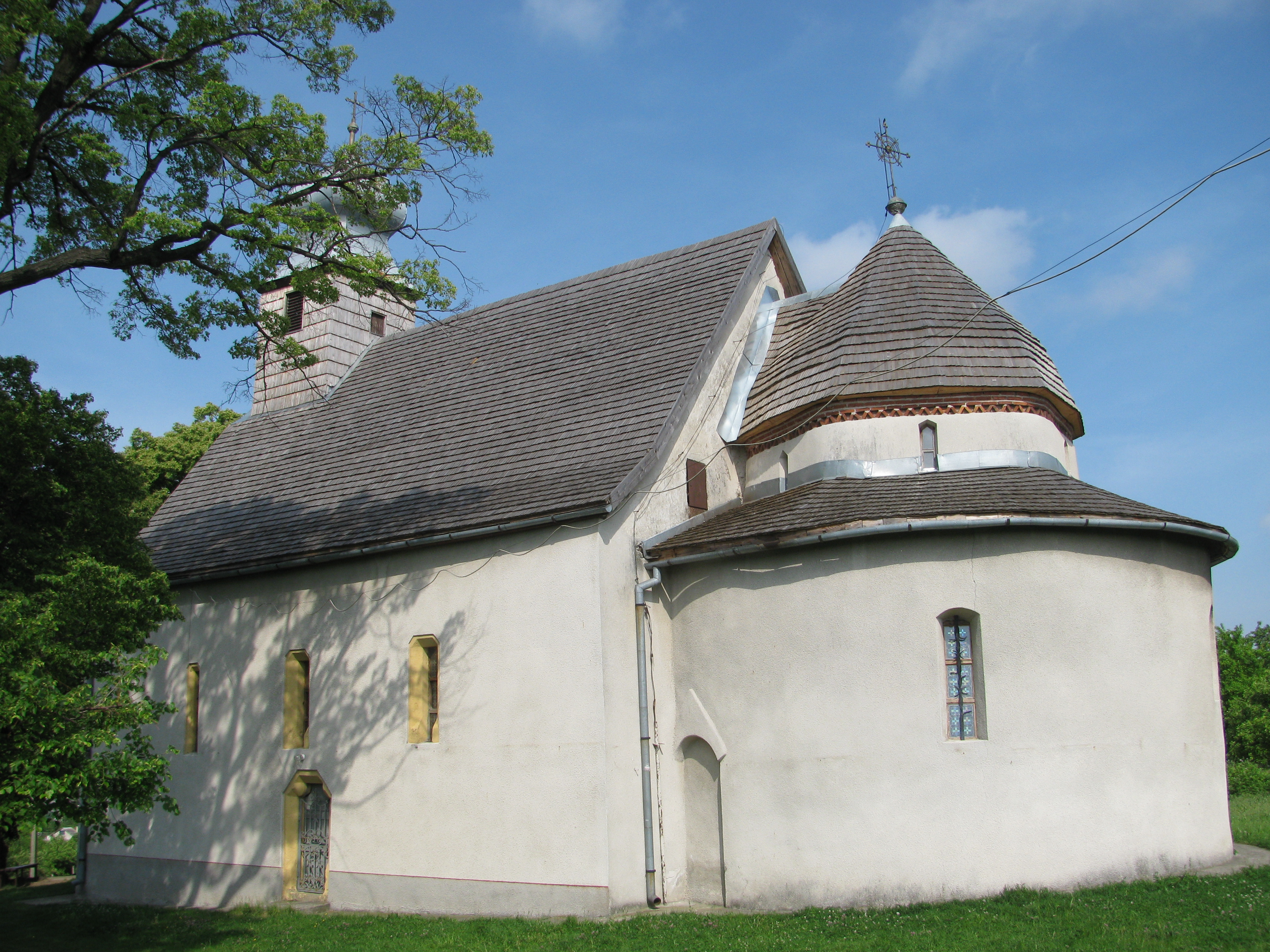
Side view

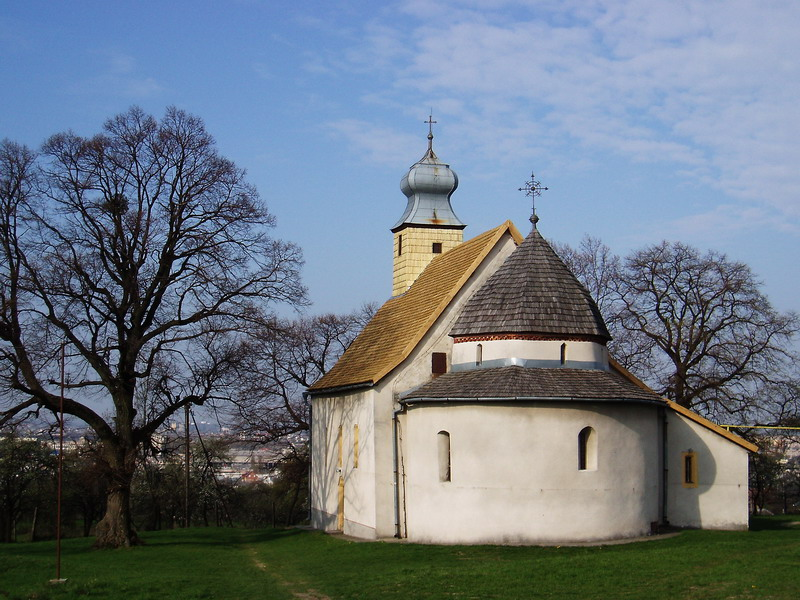
Back view

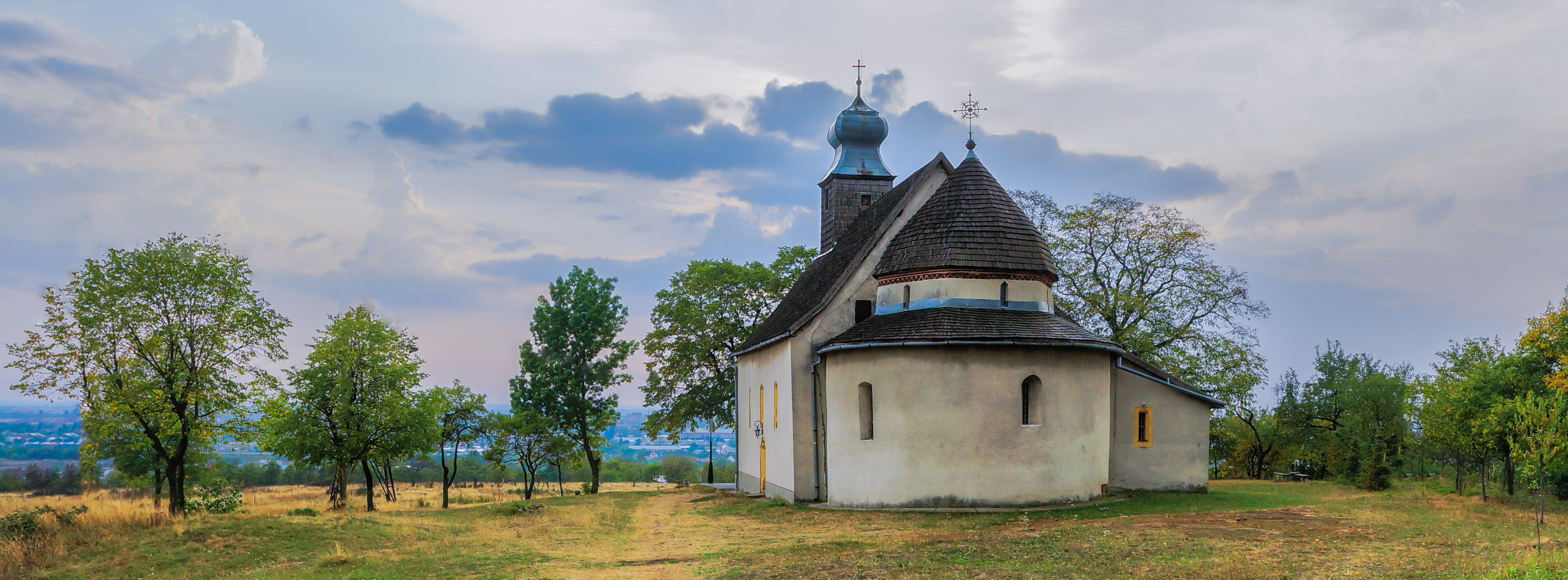
Back view panorama

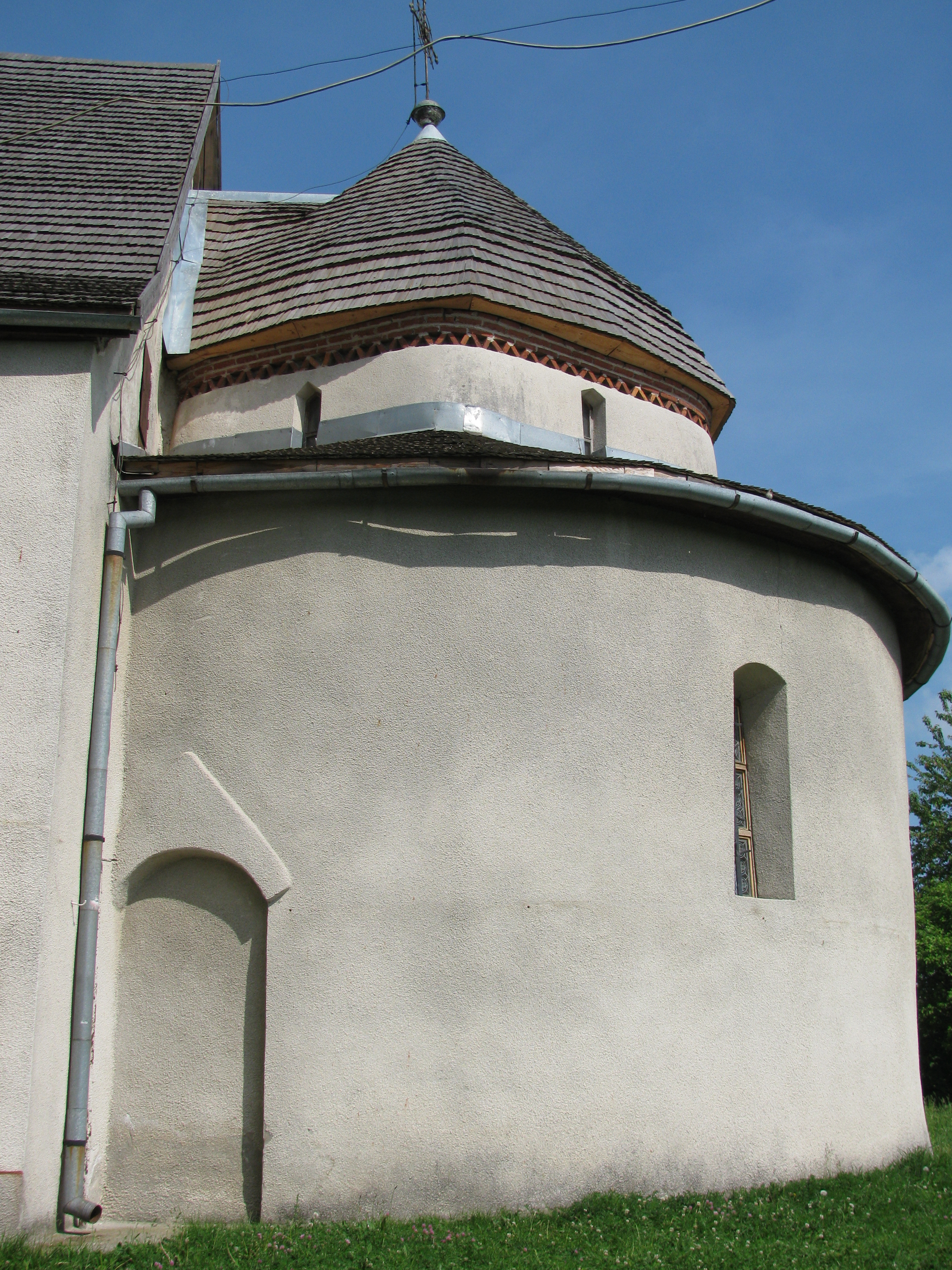
Rotunda

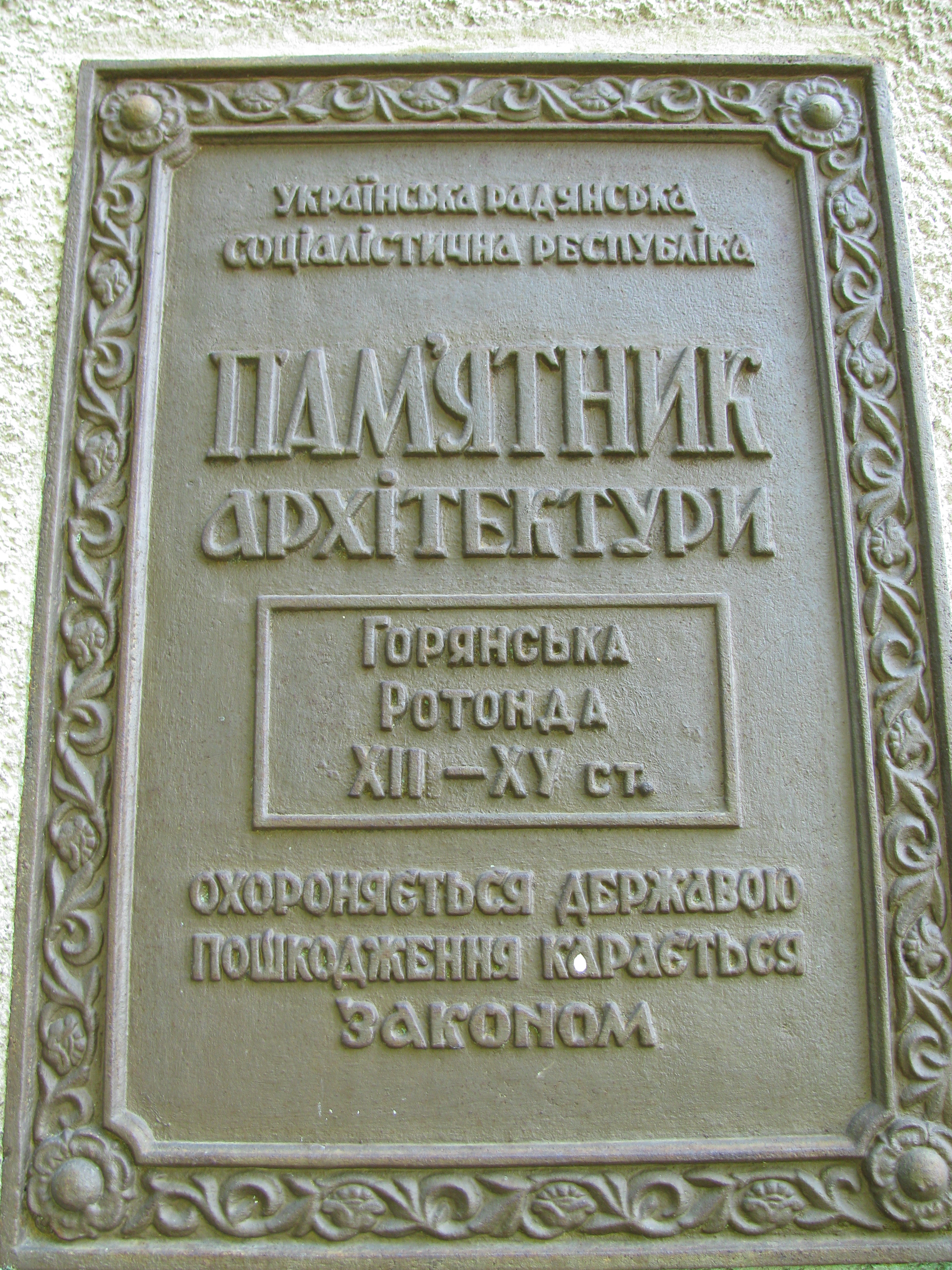
Plaque

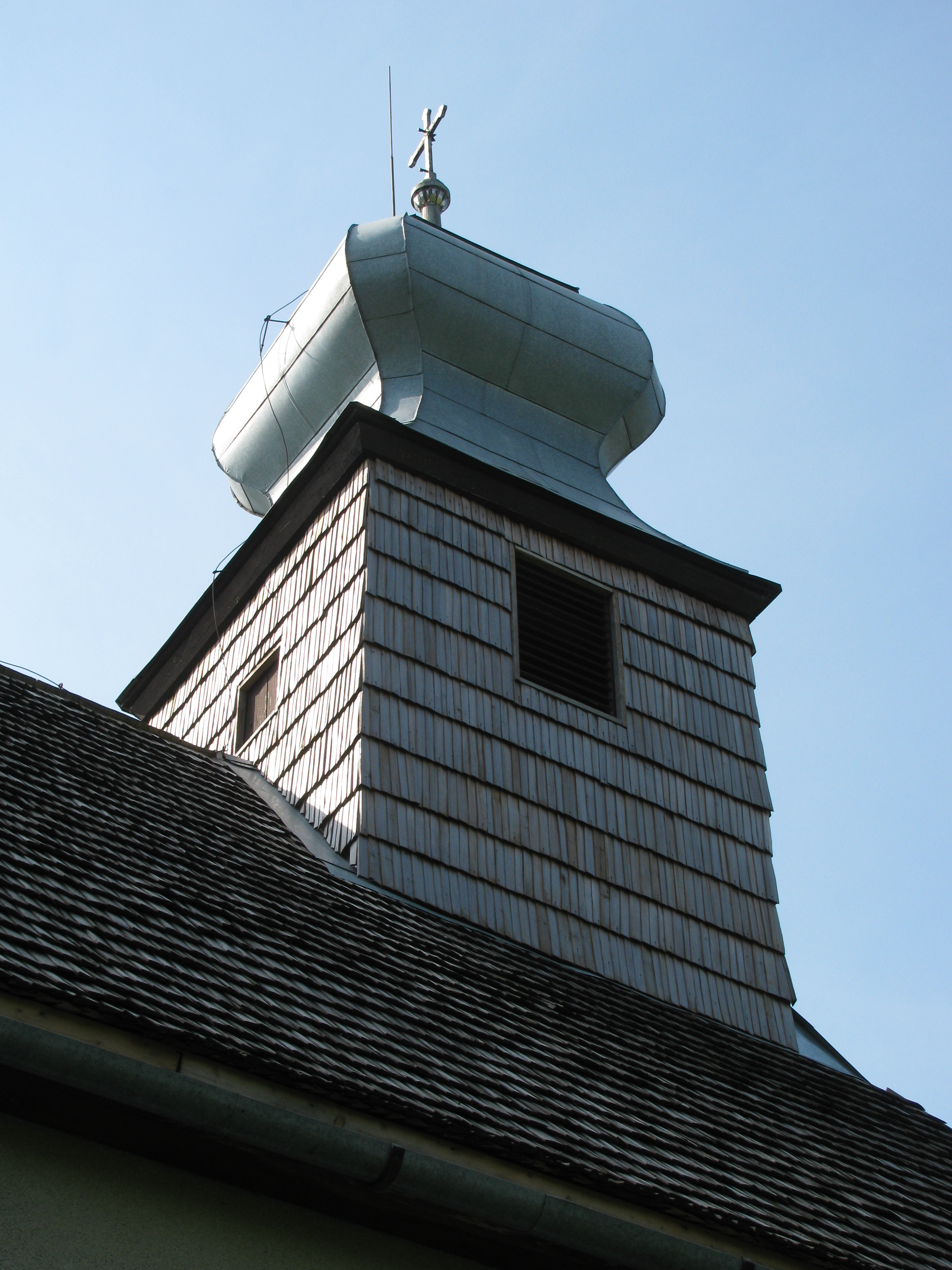
Cupola of the nave

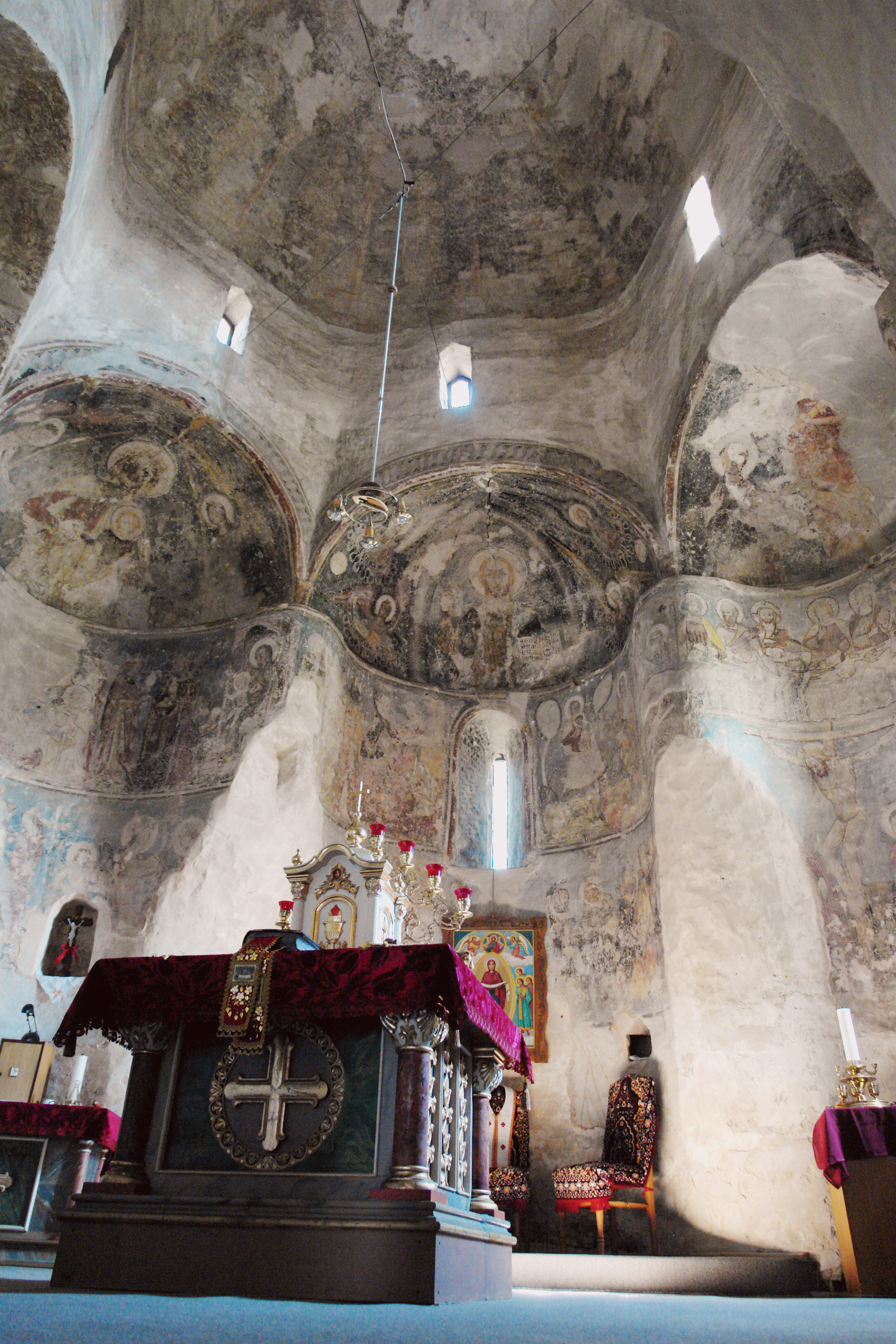
Interior

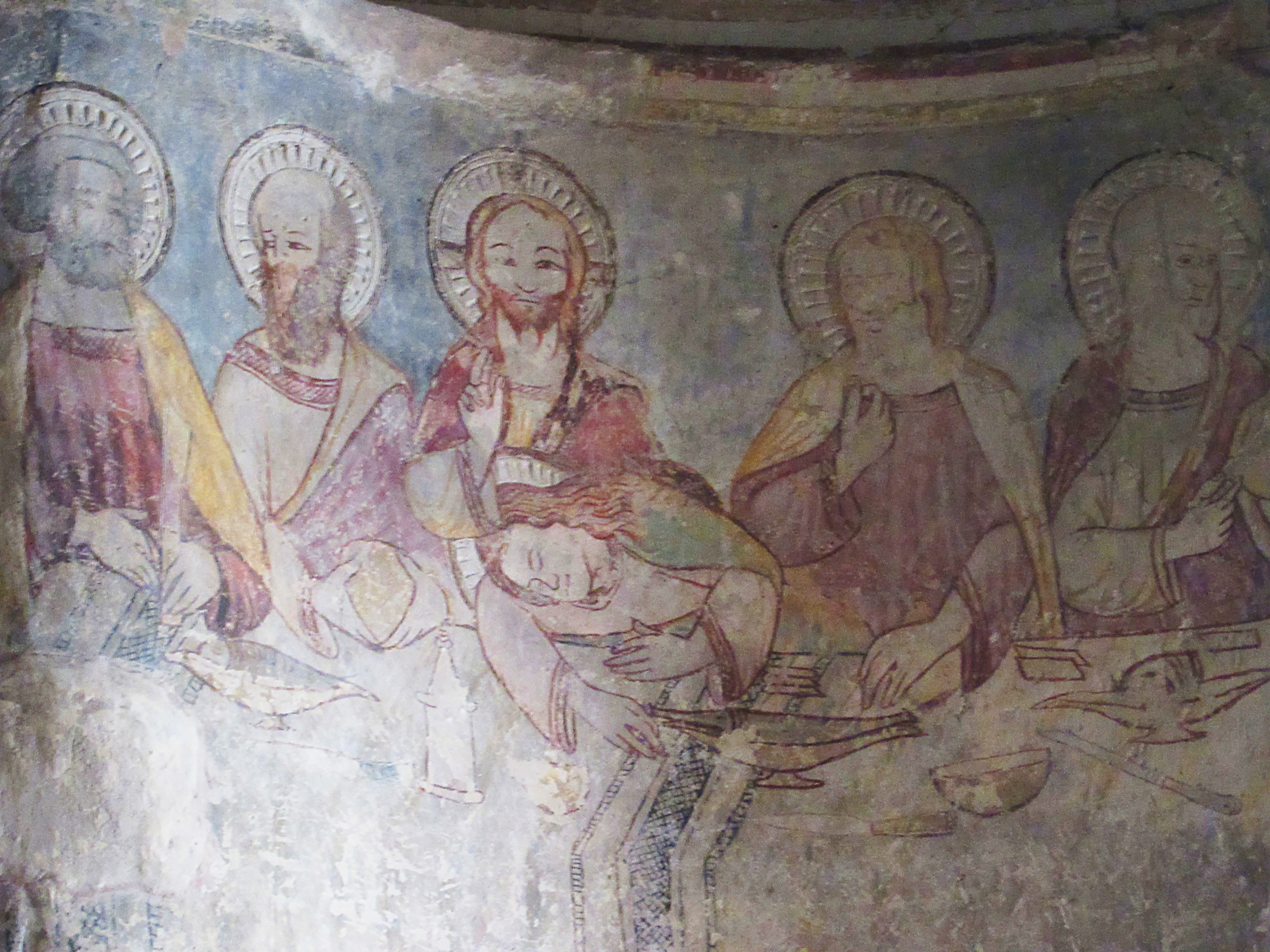
Last Supper fresco

== See also ==
- High medieval domes

== Sources ==
- Chaban M. Горянська церква-ротонда Святого Миколая // Енциклопедія історії України : у 10 т. / Edited: V. A. Smoliy (head) et al.; Institute of History of Ukraine. — Kyiv : Naukova Dumka, 2004. — V. 2 : Г — Д. — С. 176. — ISBN 966-00-0405-2.
- Sichynskyi V. Ротонди на Україні.- Kyiv: Kyiv-Druk, 1929.- 32 с.
- Dyba Y. Українські храми-ротонди Х-першої половини XIV століть. Lviv, 2005.- 106 с.
- Горянська ротонда. Буклет. Ужгород, Карпати, 1967.
