= János Erdélyi =

Hungarian poet (1814–1868)

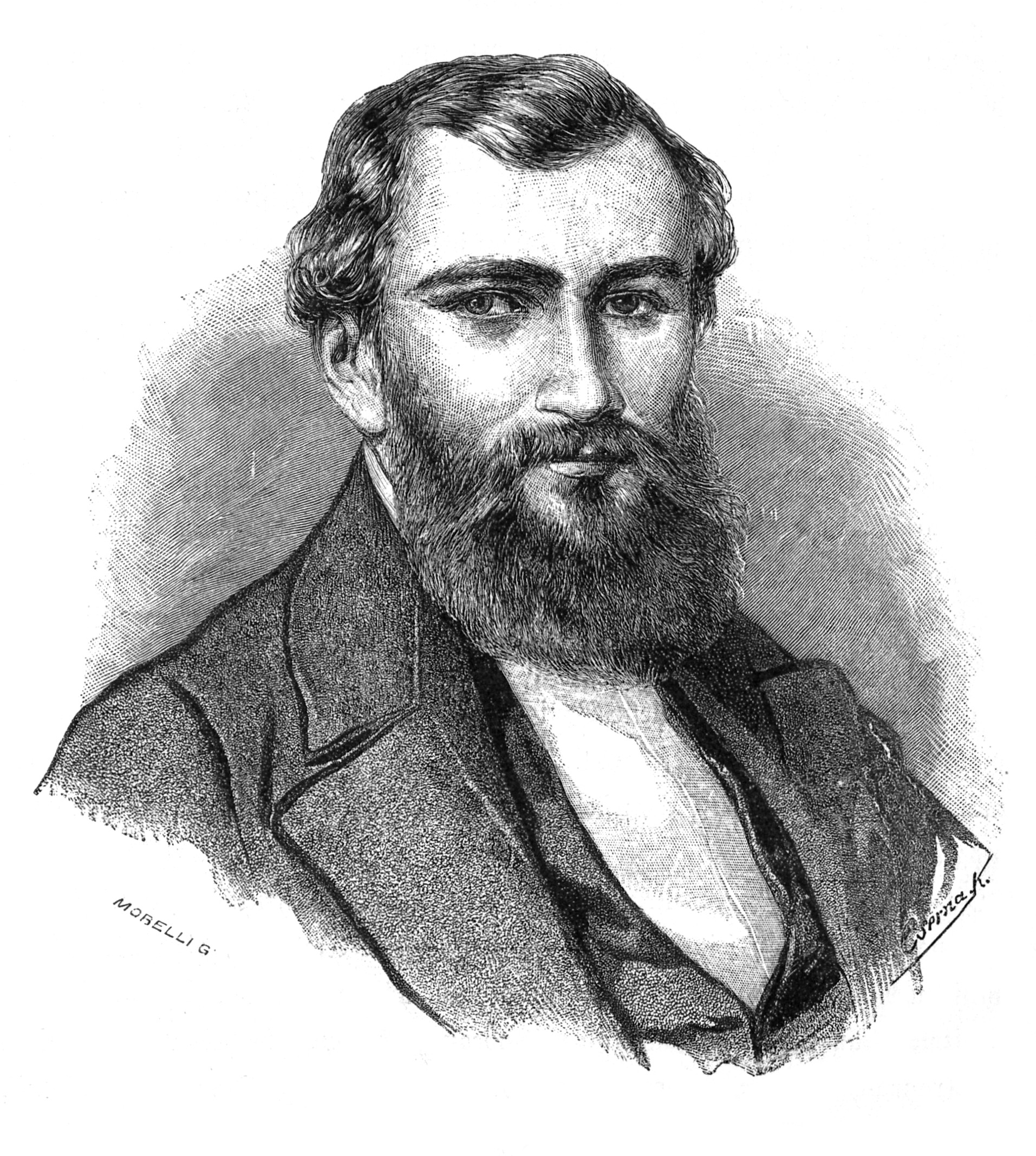
- Erdélyi c. 1890
- Born: 1 April 1814; Nagykapos, Ung County
- Died: 23 January 1868 (aged 53); Sárospatak
- Occupations: poet, philosopher, ethnographist
- Known for: poems written in folk style
- Notable work: Magyar népköltési gyűjtemény, népdalok és mondák ("Collection of Hungarian Folklore, Folk Songs and Tales")

János Erdélyi (1 April 1814 – 23 January 1868) was a Hungarian poet, critic, author, philosopher and ethnographist.

He was born 1 April 1814 at Nagykapos, in the county of Ung, and educated at the Protestant college of Sárospatak. In 1833 he moved to Pest, where he was, in 1839, elected member of the Hungarian Academy of Sciences. He began his literary career with poems written in folk style (published in 1844).

His literary fame was made by his collection of Hungarian national poems and folk-tales, Magyar népköltési gyűjtemény, népdalok és mondák ("Collection of Hungarian Folklore, Folk Songs and Tales", Pest, 1846–1847). This work, published by the Kisfaludy Society, was supplemented his ilnon Hiinaarian national ooetrv afterwards partially translated into German by Stier (Berlin, 1851). Erdélyi also compiled for the Kisfaludy Society an extensive collection of Hungarian proverbs Magyar közmondások könyve ("Book of Hungarian Proverbs", Pest, 1851), and was for some time editor of the Szépirodalmi Szemle ("Review of Polite Literature"). In 1848 he was appointed director of the national theatre at Pest; but after 1849 he resided at his native town. He died on 23 January 1868 in Sárospatak. A collection of folklore was published the year after his death, entitled A nép költészete: népdalok, népmesék és közmondások ("Poetry of the People: Folk Songs, Tales and Proverbs", Pest, 1869). This work contains 300 national songs, 19 folk-tales and 7362 Hungarian proverbs.

As a philosopher he was an utopian socialist, influenced by Hegel.

== Quotes ==
- "It was said that education harms folk poetry, and it's true, but should we curse the Sun for banishing the dawn?" (Mondatott: a műveltség árt a népköltészetnek, s ez igaz, de miért átkoznók a napot, hogy a hajnalt elűzi egünkről.)
