= Puig d'Arques =

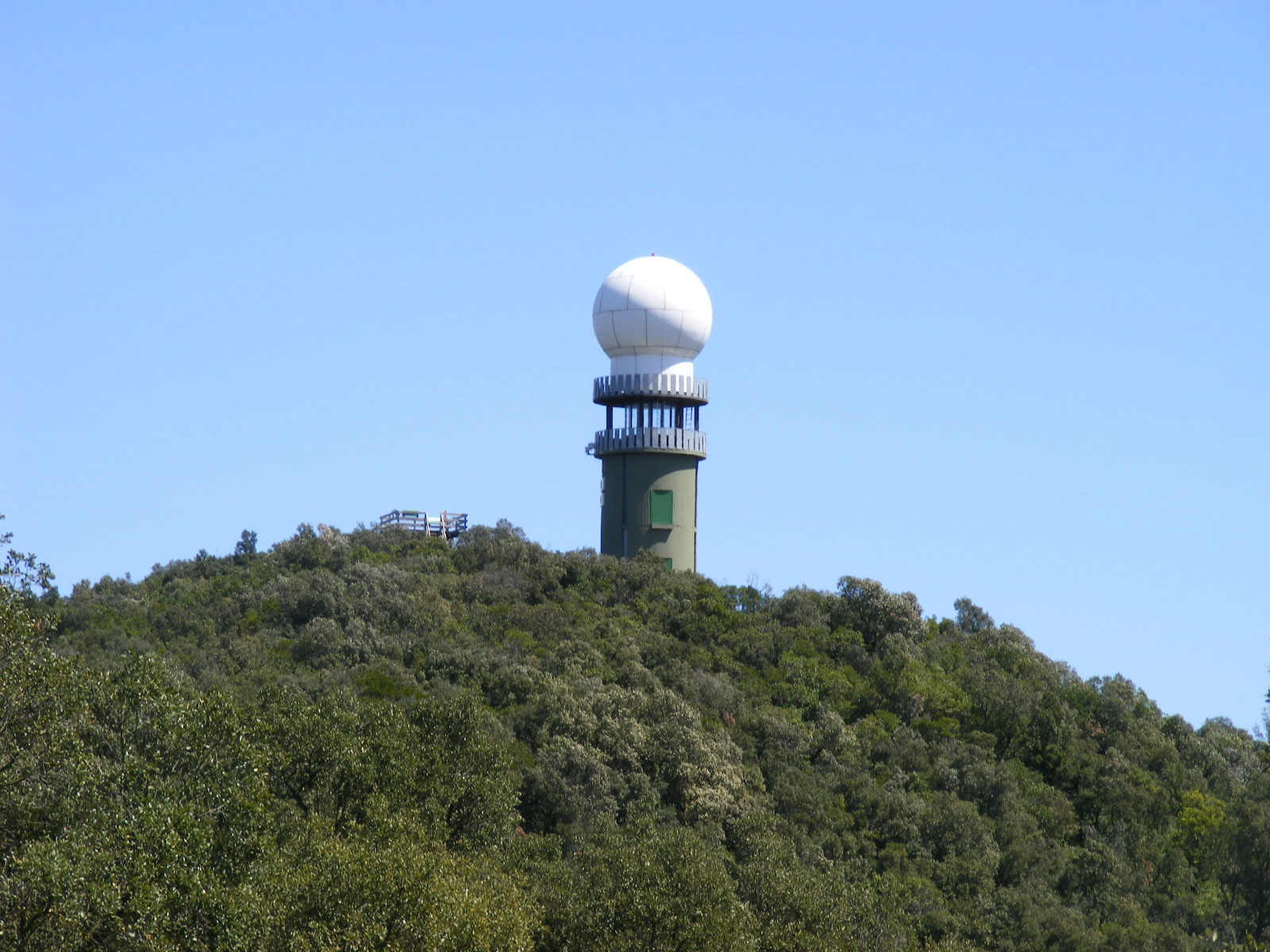
- Puig d'Arques summit

Highest point
- Elevation: 532 m (1,745 ft)
- Coordinates: 41°53′19″N 2°59′40″E

Geography
- Location: Baix Empordà, Catalonia
- Parent range: Les Gavarres (Catalan Coastal Range)

Geology
- Mountain type: Siliceous

Climbing
- First ascent: Unknown
- Easiest route: From Cruïlles, Monells or Sant Sadurní de l'Heura

Puig d'Arques is a mountain of Catalonia, Spain. It has an elevation of 532 metres above sea level.

== See also ==
- Catalan Coastal Range
- Mountains of Catalonia
