= Rissec =

River in Spain

Coordinates: 42°15′25.26″N 2°54′41.41″E

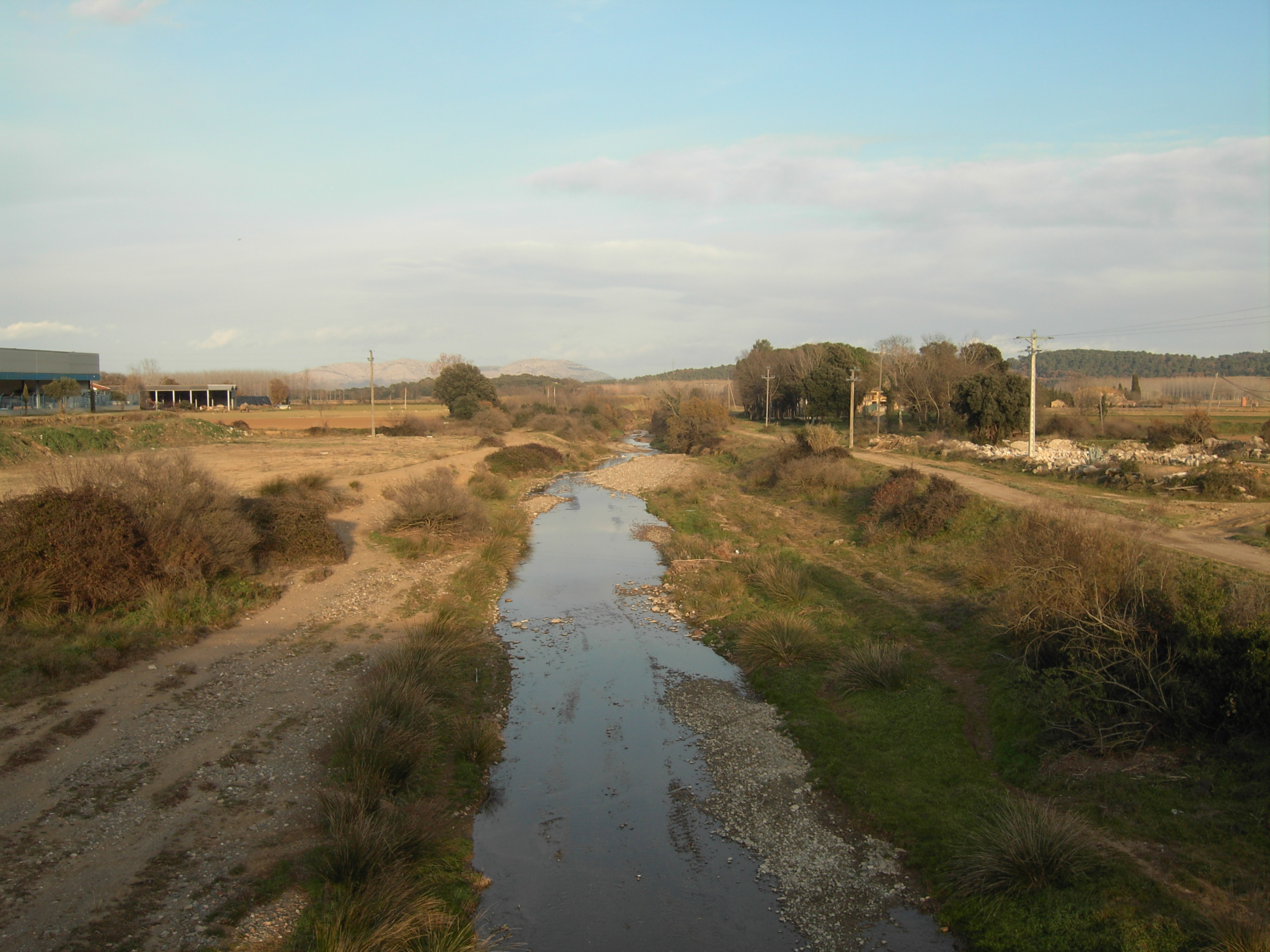
- The Rissec passes through Corçà

Location
- Country: Spain
- Region: Catalonia
- Cities: Corçà, Monells

Physical characteristics
- Source: Els Àngels
  - location: Gavarres, Catalonia, Spain
- Discharge
  - location: Corçà

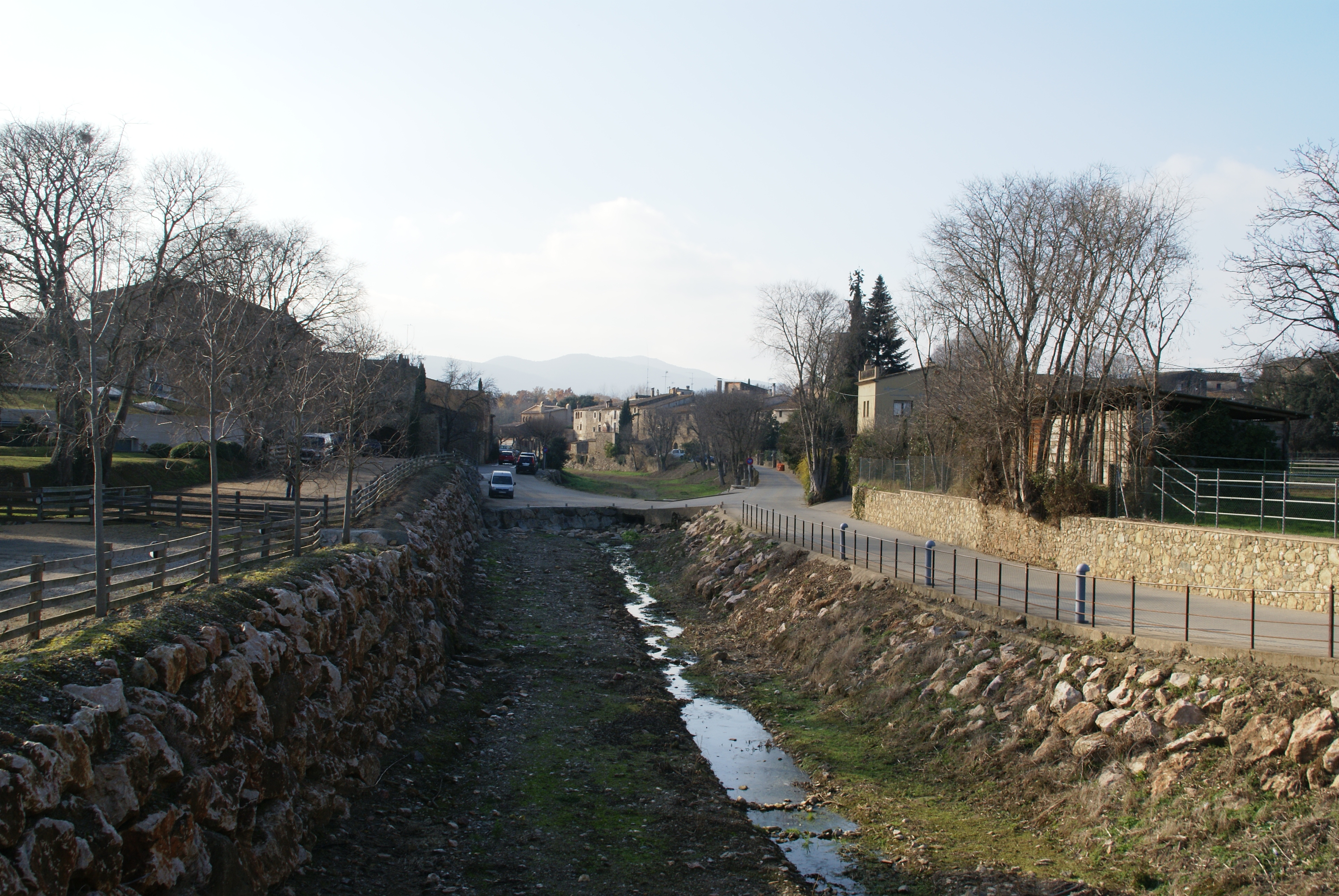
The Rissec in Monells

The Rissec (Catalan pronunciation: [riˈsɛk], lit. 'dry river') is a tributary river from the Empordà which lies to the west of the Daró river. Originating in Gavarres Mountains in the Els Àngels region, it empties into the Daró river in the municipality Corçà. During its course it is fed by the water from the Rodonell river and the Sant Pere creek.
