= Sant Miquel, Cruïlles =

Benedictine monastery in Cruïlles, Catalonia, Spain

Coordinates: 41.953974°N 3.00472°E

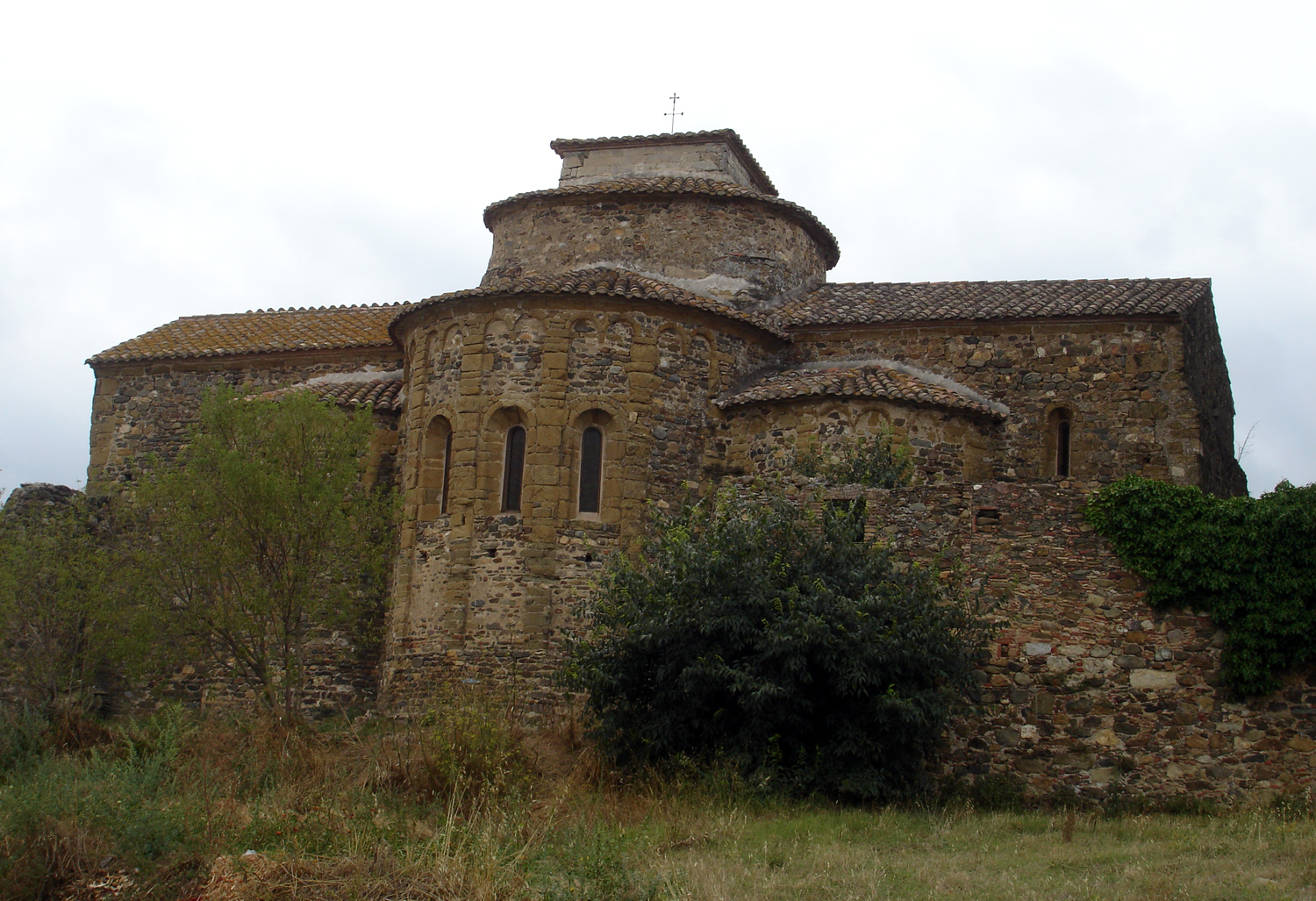
Monestir de Sant Miquel de Cruïlles

Sant Miquel de Cruïlles is a Benedictine monastery in Cruïlles, Monells i Sant Sadurní de l'Heura, Catalonia, Spain. The 11th-century building, in First Romanesque style, was declared a Bien de Interés Cultural landmark in 1931.

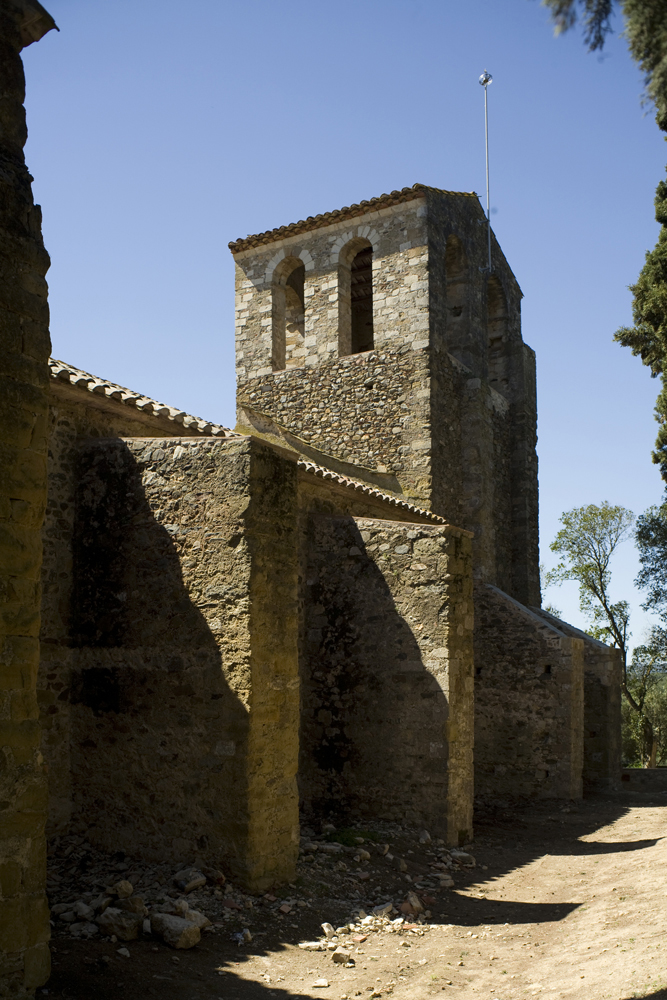
Exterior

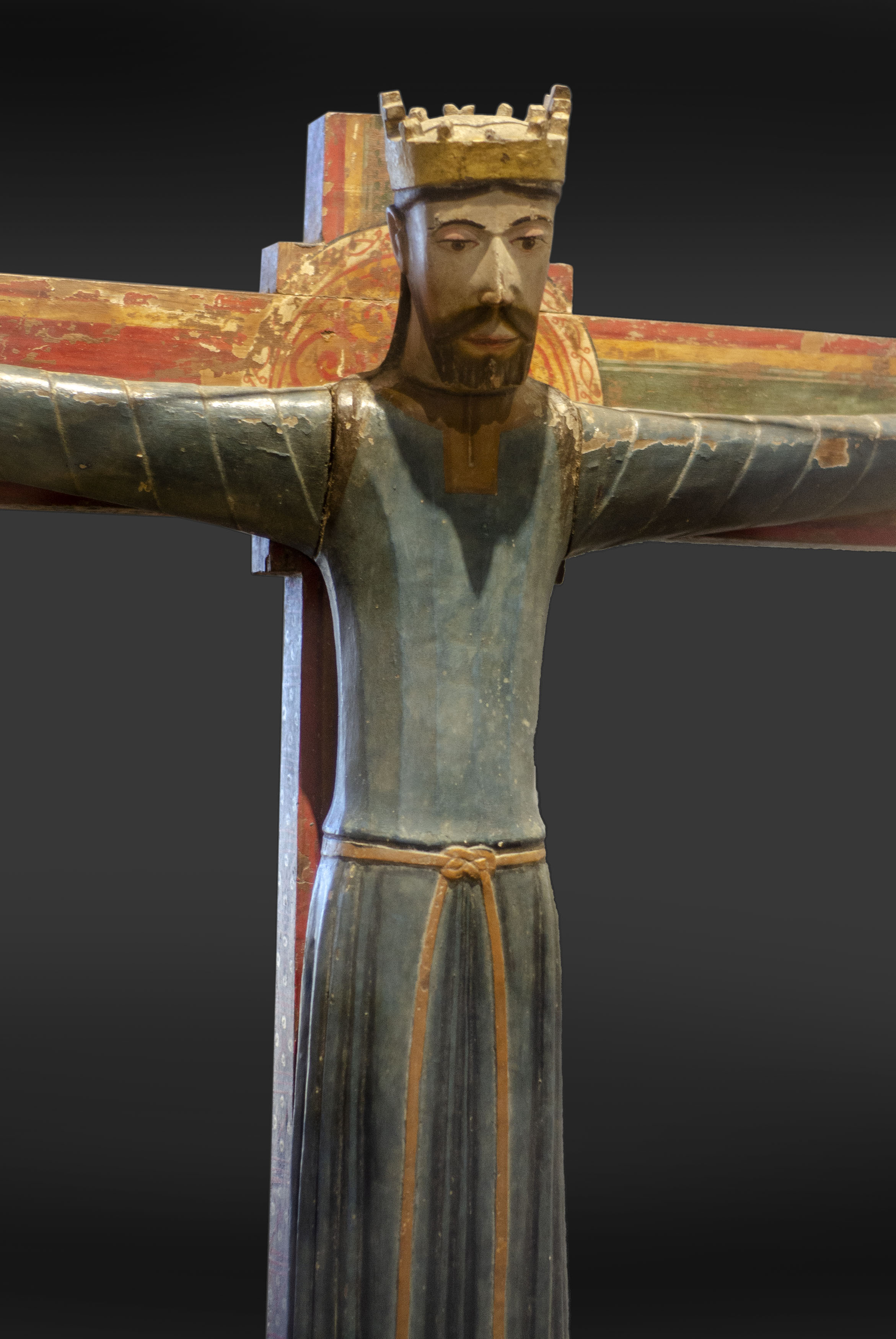
Cruxifix of Christ King

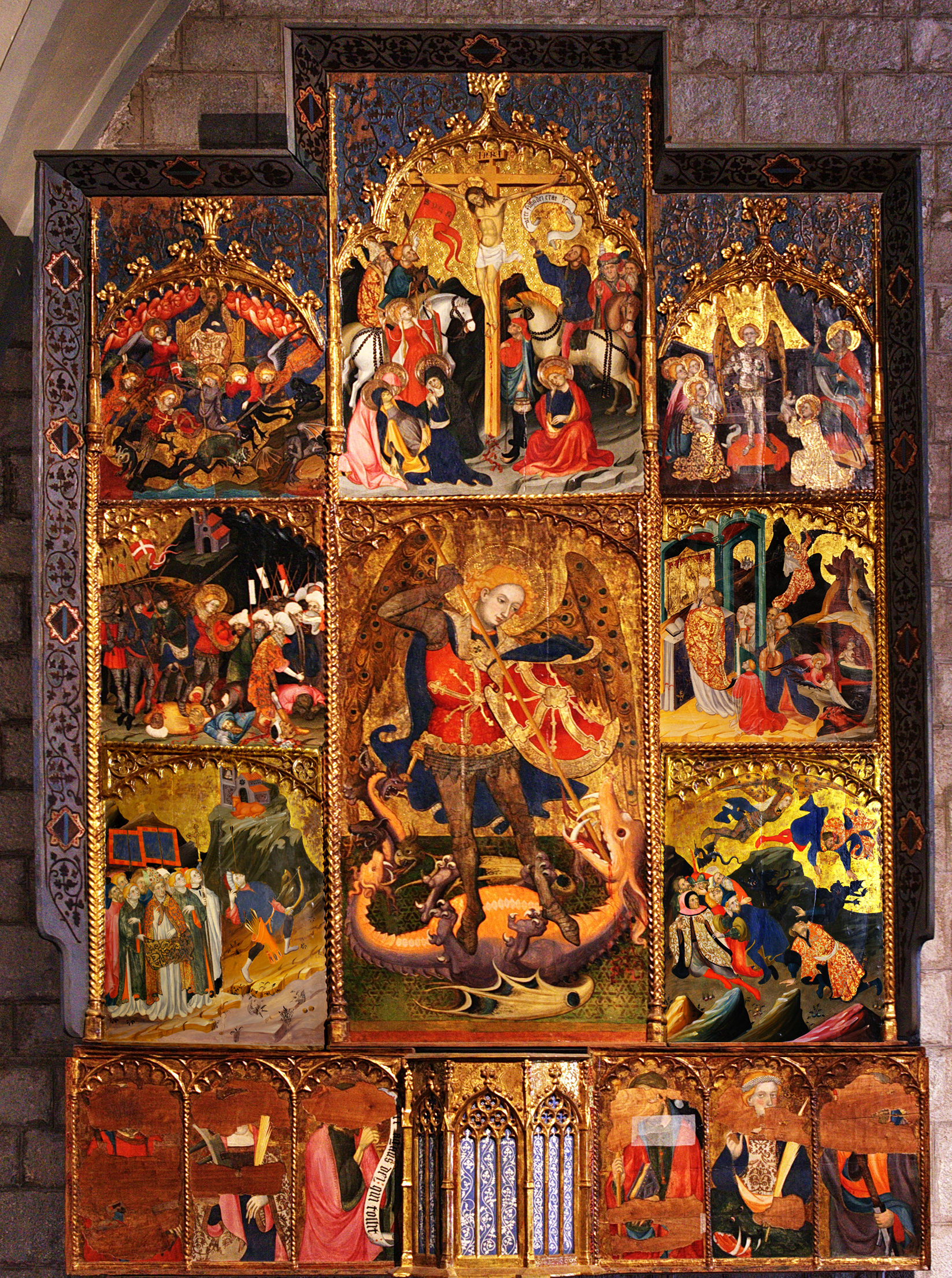
Retable

== See also ==
- High medieval domes
