= Cruïlles =

- Village
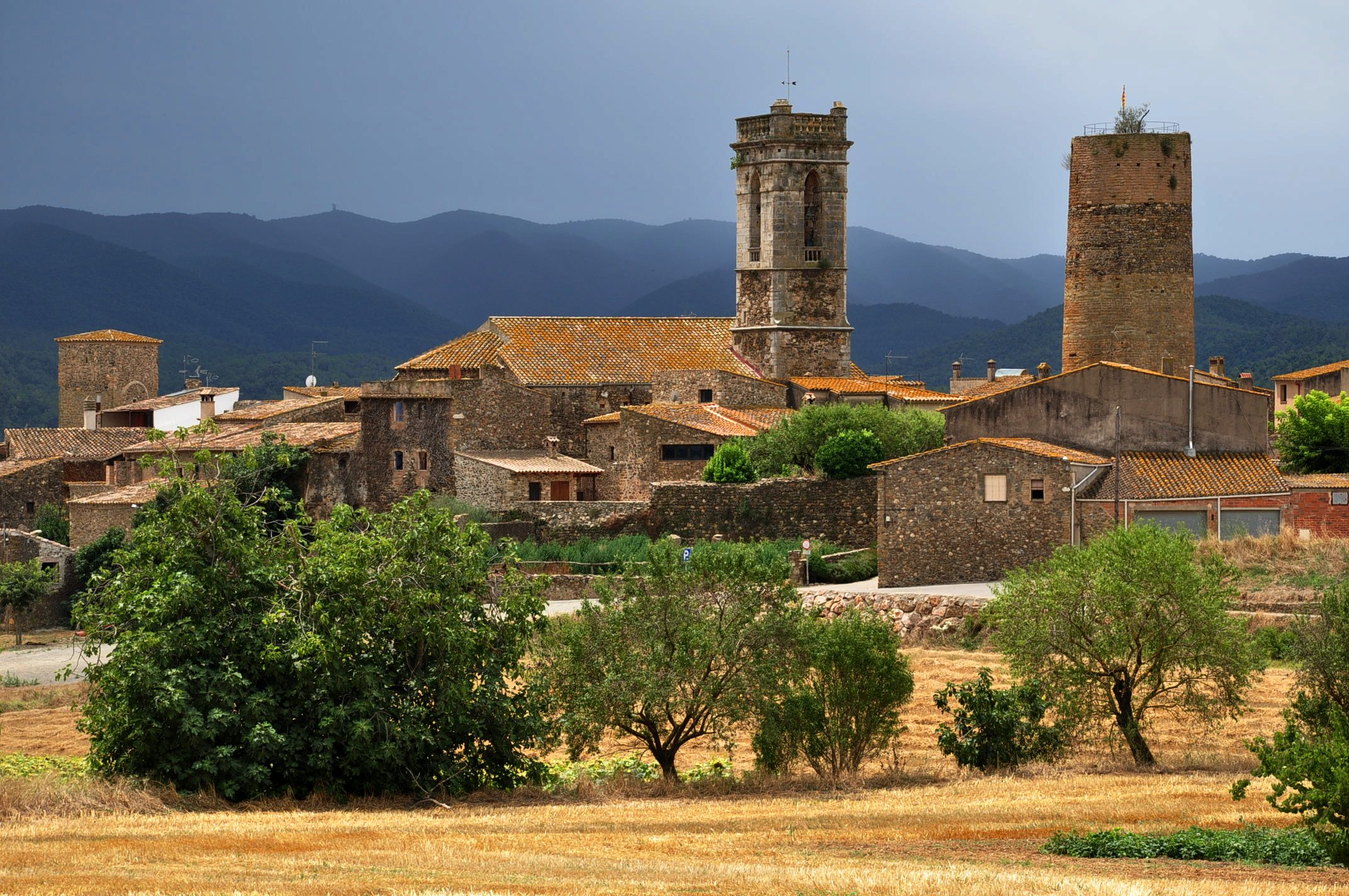
- Cruïlles with the Gavarres hills

- Coat of arms

- Location in Catalonia
- Coordinates: 41°57′19.23″N 3°0′47.78″E
- Country: Spain
- Community: Catalonia
- Province: Girona
- Comarca: Baix Empordà
- Municipality: Cruïlles, Monells i Sant Sadurní de l'Heura

Cruïlles (Catalan pronunciation: [kɾuˈiʎəs]) is a village in the Baix Empordà, now part of the municipality of Cruïlles, Monells i Sant Sadurní de l'Heura, which is the administrative center and location of City Hall. It was its own municipality until 1973, when it merged with Monells and Sant Sadurní de l'Heura to form the current municipality.

In 2005 it was the second most populated village in the municipality after Puigventós with 250 inhabitants.

== Geography ==
The expansive borders of Cruïlles extend from the plains of Empordà to finally encompass much of the massifs of the Gavarres. The village is located at the Pla de Cruïlles, above the Daró river and at the foot of the rural road GI-664 between la Bisbal d'Empordà and Cassà de la Selva, a few miles from la Bisbal.

== History ==
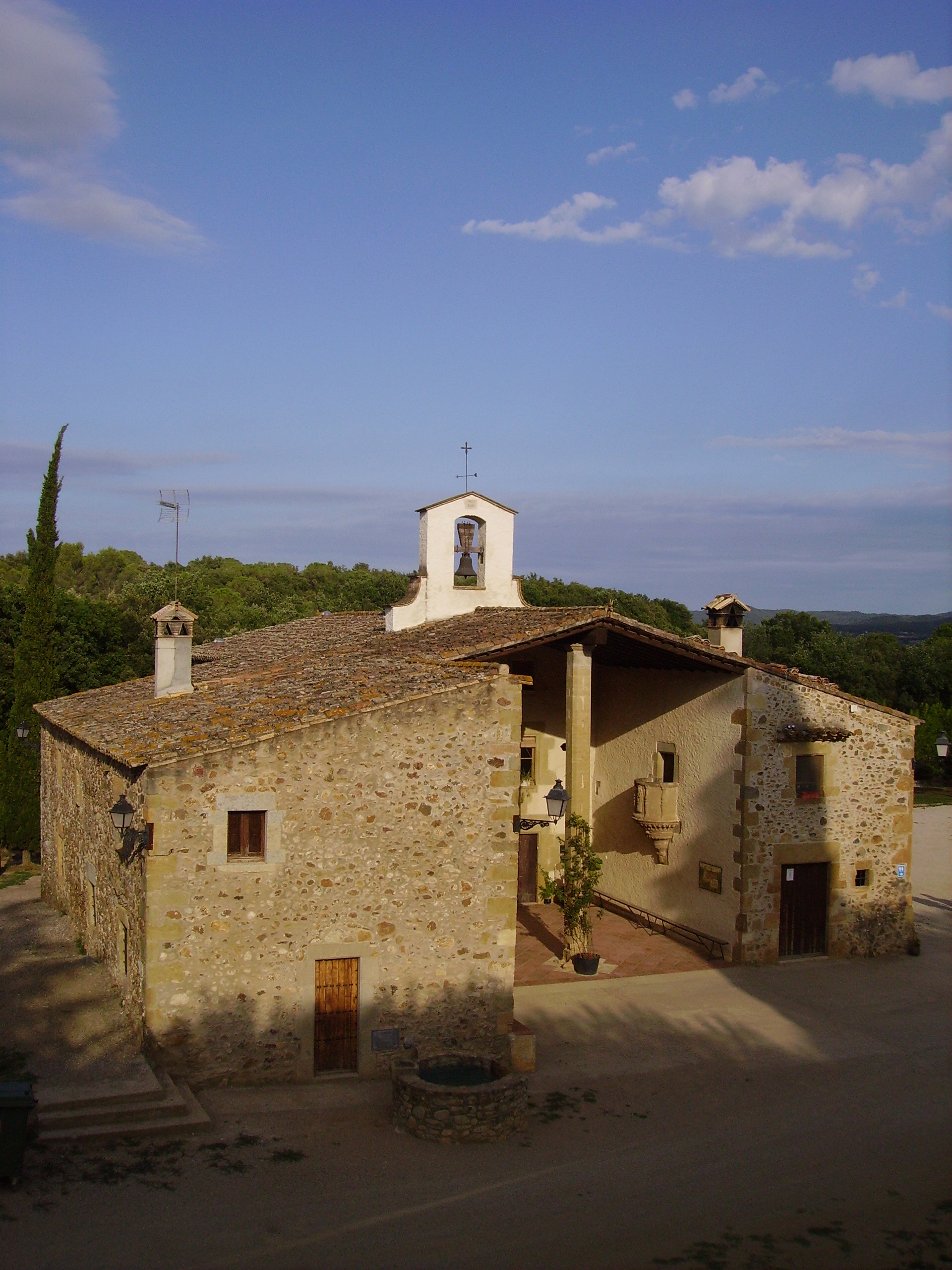
Hermitage of la Mare de Déu de l'Esperança

The town was the seat of the lords of Cruïlles, which, in the thirteenth century, was also Peratallada.

== Monuments and landmarks ==
- Cruïlles Tower
- Monastery of Sant Miquel de Cruïlles
- Parish Church of Santa Eulàlia de Cruïlles
- Hermitage of la Mare de Déu de l'Esperança
