= Cruïlles, Monells i Sant Sadurní de l'Heura =

- Municipality
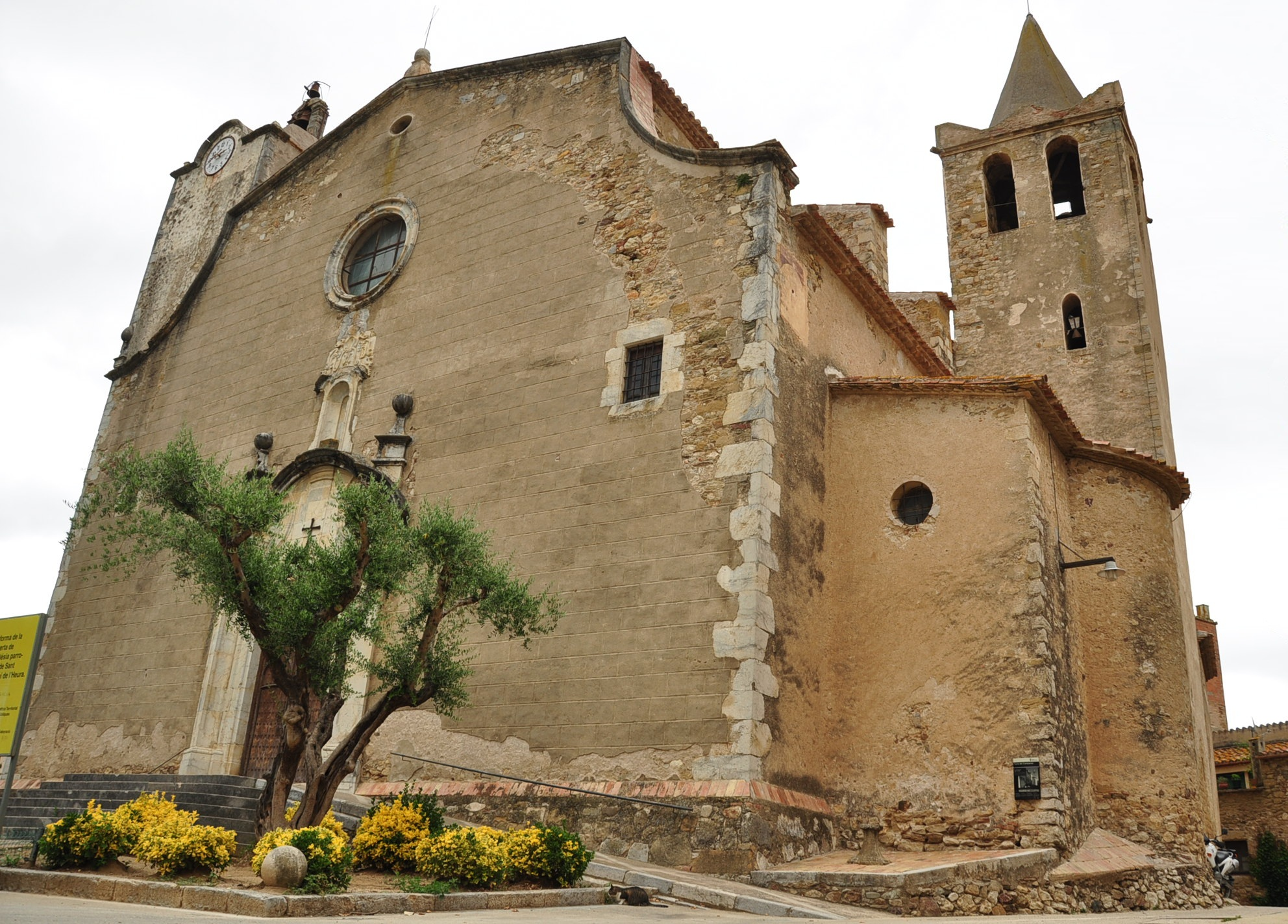
- Church of Sant Sadurní de l'Heura (built 1773-1777).

- Location in Catalonia Cruïlles, Monells i Sant Sadurní de l'Heura (Spain)
- Coordinates: 41°57′30″N 2°59′34″E
- Country: Spain
- Community: Catalonia
- Province: Girona
- Comarca: Baix Empordà

Government
  - Mayor: Salvi Casas Camps (2015)

Area
  - Total: 99.8 km^{2} (38.5 sq mi)
- Elevation: 110 m (360 ft)

Population (2025-01-01)
  - Total: 1,350
  - Density: 13.5/km^{2} (35.0/sq mi)
- Postal code: 17901
- Website: cruilles.cat

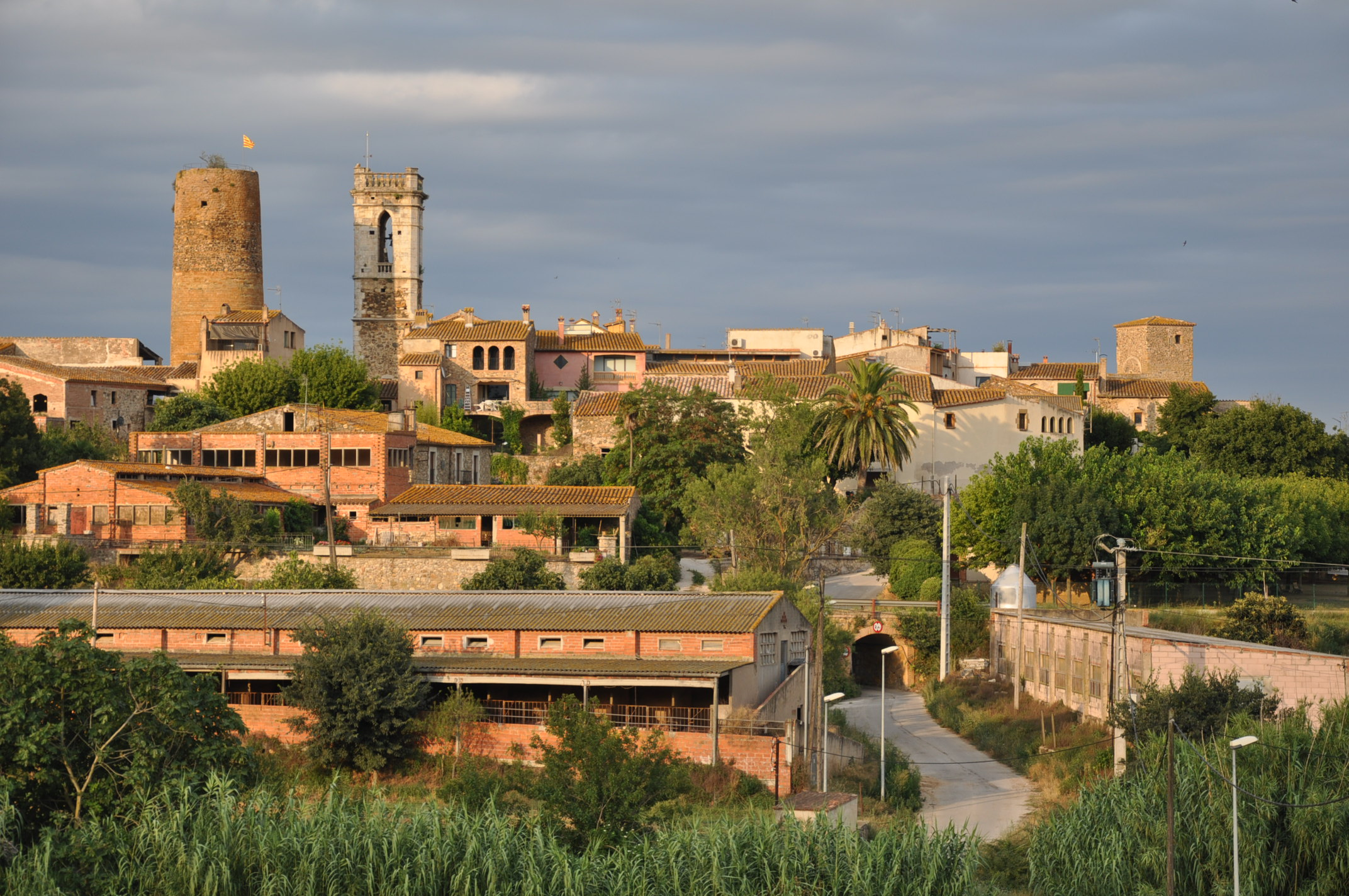
Cruïlles, the village

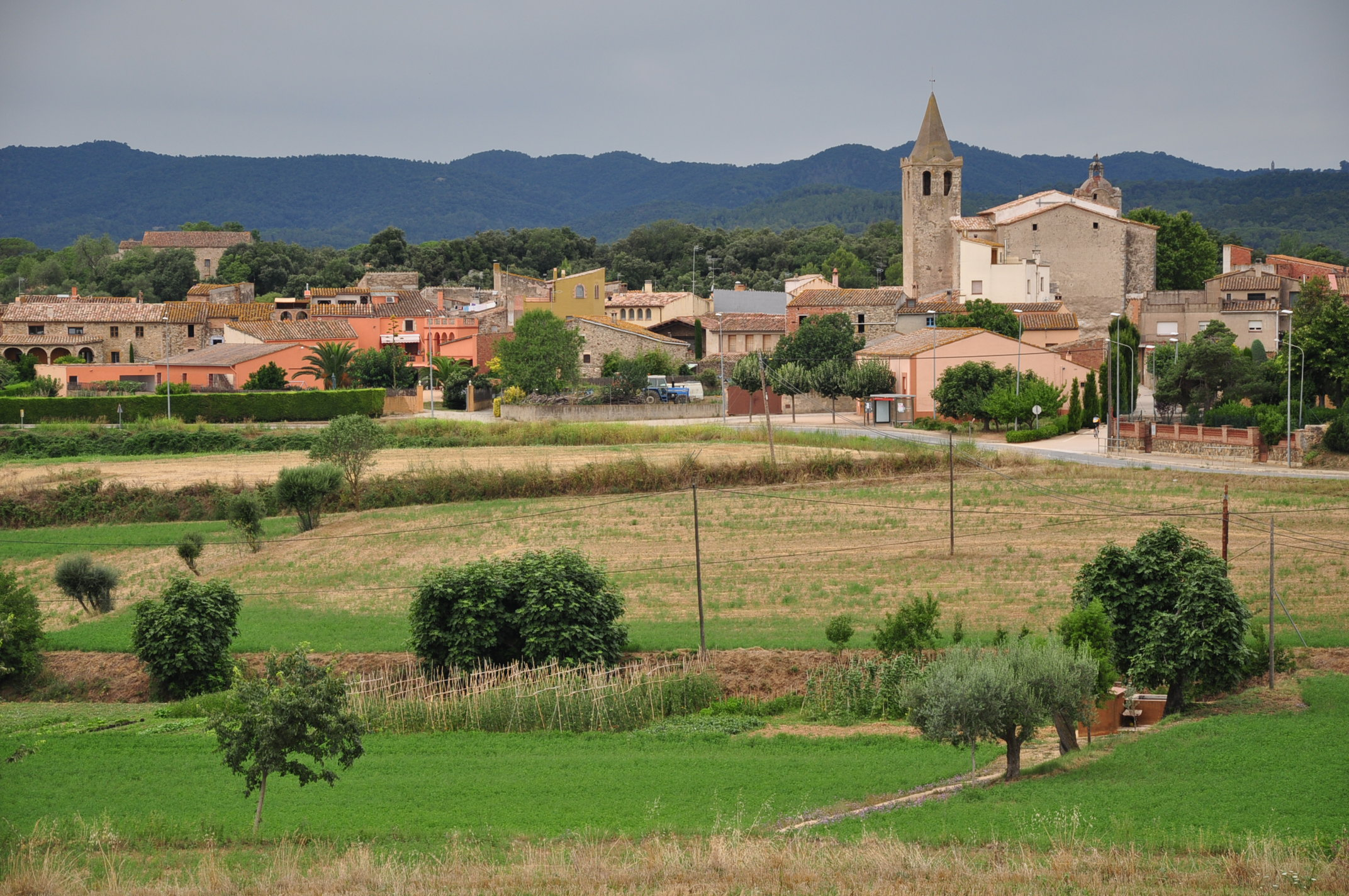
Sant Sadurní de l'Heura, the village

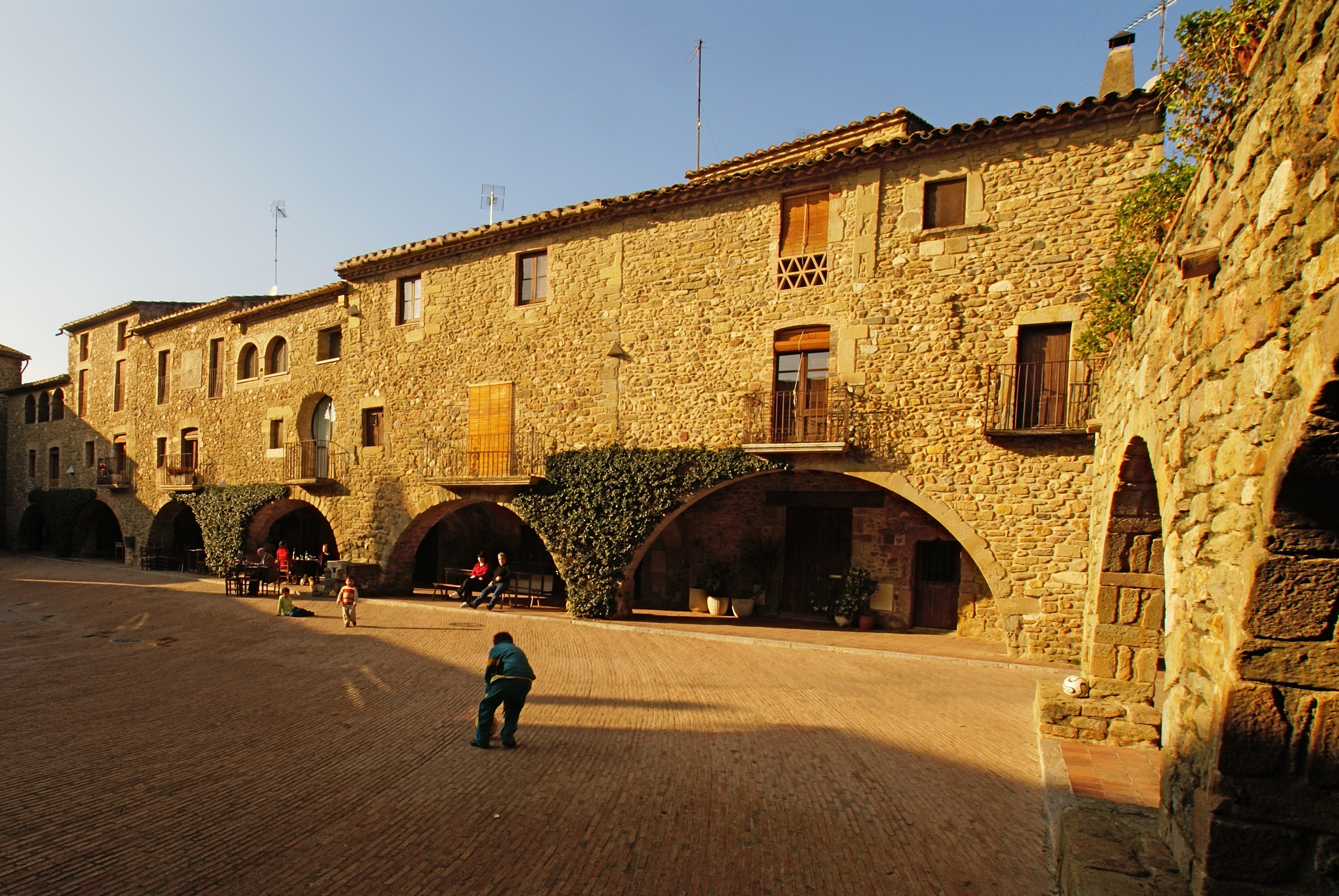
Monells, main square

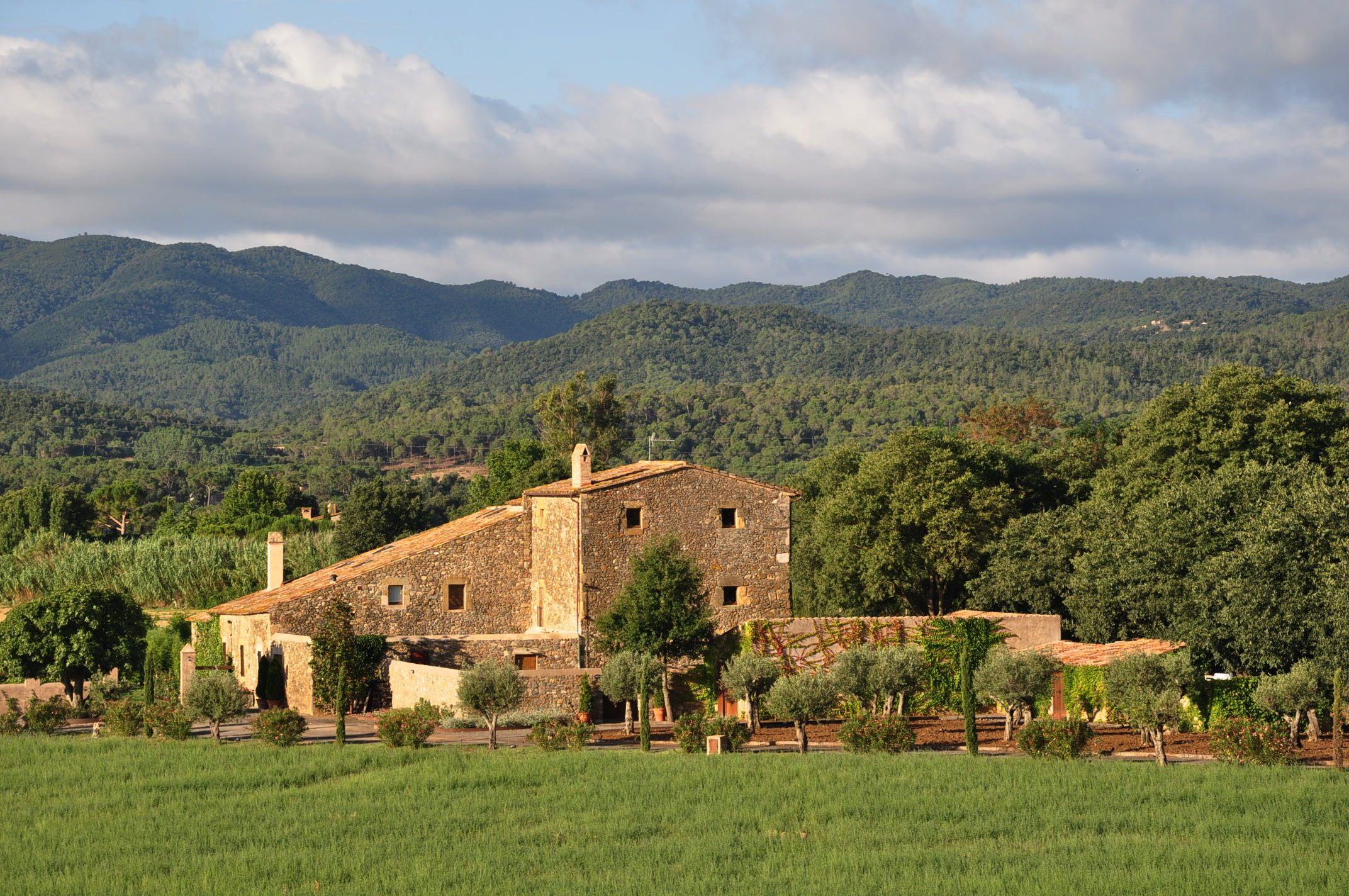
Former farm 'Can Botero' near Cruïlles

Cruïlles, Monells i Sant Sadurní de l'Heura (Catalan pronunciation: [kɾuˈiʎəz muˈneʎz i ˈsan səðuɾˈni ðə ˈlɛwɾə]) is a Spanish municipality of the Province of Girona, situated in the comarca (county) of Baix Empordà (Catalonia), formed in 1973 by merging the municipalities of Cruïlles, Monells, and Sant Sadurní de l'Heura. Sant Sadurní is the capital of the municipality. According to the 2014 census, the municipality has a population of 1,284 inhabitants.

The municipality has the longest toponym in Catalan at 43 characters.

== Villages ==
Populated place	Inhabitants
Veïnat del Rissec	11
Veïnat de Sies	49
Veïnat de Sant Joan	3
Veïnat de la Font, el	12
Veïnat de Banyeres	31
Veïnat d'Estravau	4
Santa Pellaia	19
Sant Sadurní de l'Heura	174
Sant Miquel de Cruïlles	17
Sant Joan de Salelles	19
Sant Cebrià dels Alls	5
Sant Cebrià de Lledó	7
Rabioses, les	80
Puigventós	370
Monells	182
Cruïlles	250
Barri del Mas Savalls	0

== Places of interest ==
- Monastery of Sant Miquel de Cruïlles
- Church of Sant Sadurní de l'Heura
- Church of Santa Eulalia de Cruïlles
- Keep of Cruïlles' Castle
- Church of Sant Genís de Monells
- Church of Sant Joan de Salelles

== Demographics ==
Year	Population
1497	233
1515	187
1553	220
1717	1,222
1787	1,419
1857	2,664
1877	2,184
1887	2,173
1900	1,877
1910	1,861
1920	1,766
1930	1,600
1940	1,482
1950	1,444
1960	1,382
1970	1,152
1981	1,056
1990	1,031
1992	1,073
1994	1,088
1996	1,099
1998	1,071
2000	1,096
2002	1,150
2004	1,201
2006	1,271
2014	1,284

== See also ==
- Gavarres
