= Corçà =

- Municipality
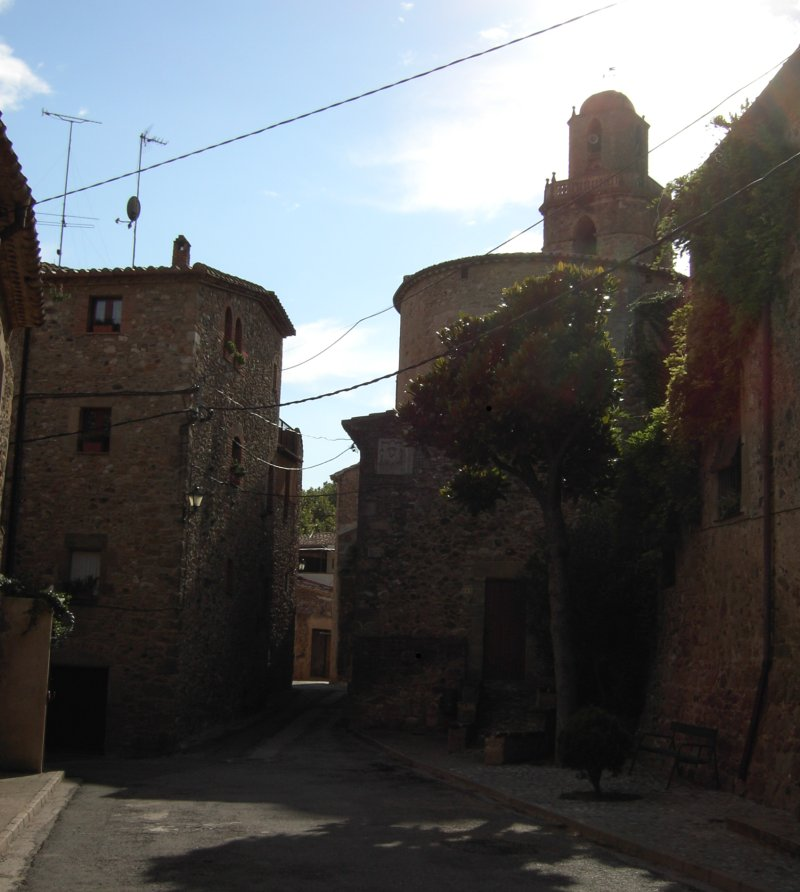
- Centre of Corçà

- Flag Coat of arms

- Location in Catalonia Corçà (Spain)
- Coordinates: 41°59′14″N 3°0′54″E
- Country: Spain
- Community: Catalonia
- Province: Girona
- Comarca: Baix Empordà

Government
  - Mayor: Maria Carme Güell Parnau (2015)

Area
  - Total: 16.3 km^{2} (6.3 sq mi)

Population (2025-01-01)
  - Total: 1,283
  - Density: 78.7/km^{2} (204/sq mi)
- Website: corca.cat

Corçà (Catalan pronunciation: [kuɾˈsa]) is a village and municipality in the province of Girona and autonomous community of Catalonia, Spain. The municipality covers an area of 16.31 square kilometres (6.30 sq mi) and the population in 2014 was 1,257.

Besides the village of Corçà, the municipality includes the following populated places:

- Anyells
- Casavells
- Cassà de Pelràs
- Matajudaica
- Planils
