= Monells =

- Village
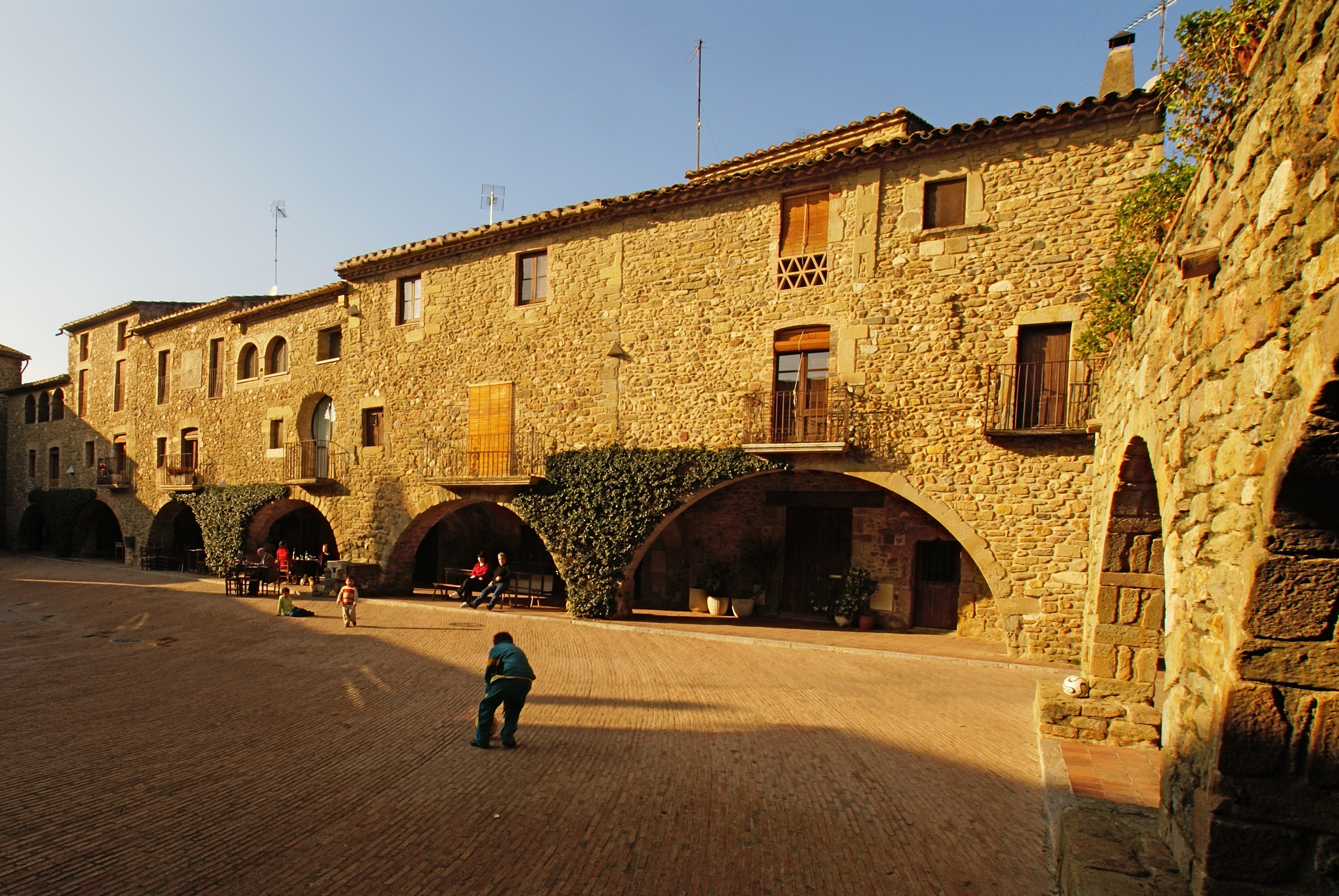
- Jaume I Square.

- Location in Catalonia
- Coordinates: 41°58′31″N 2°59′54″E
- Country: Spain
- Community: Catalonia
- Province: Girona
- Comarca: Baix Empordà
- Municipality: Cruïlles, Monells i Sant Sadurní de l'Heura

Monells (Catalan pronunciation: [muˈneʎs]) is a village belonging to the municipality of Cruïlles, Monells i Sant Sadurní de l'Heura in the comarca of the Baix Empordà. It is crossed by the Rissec river.

== Places of interest ==
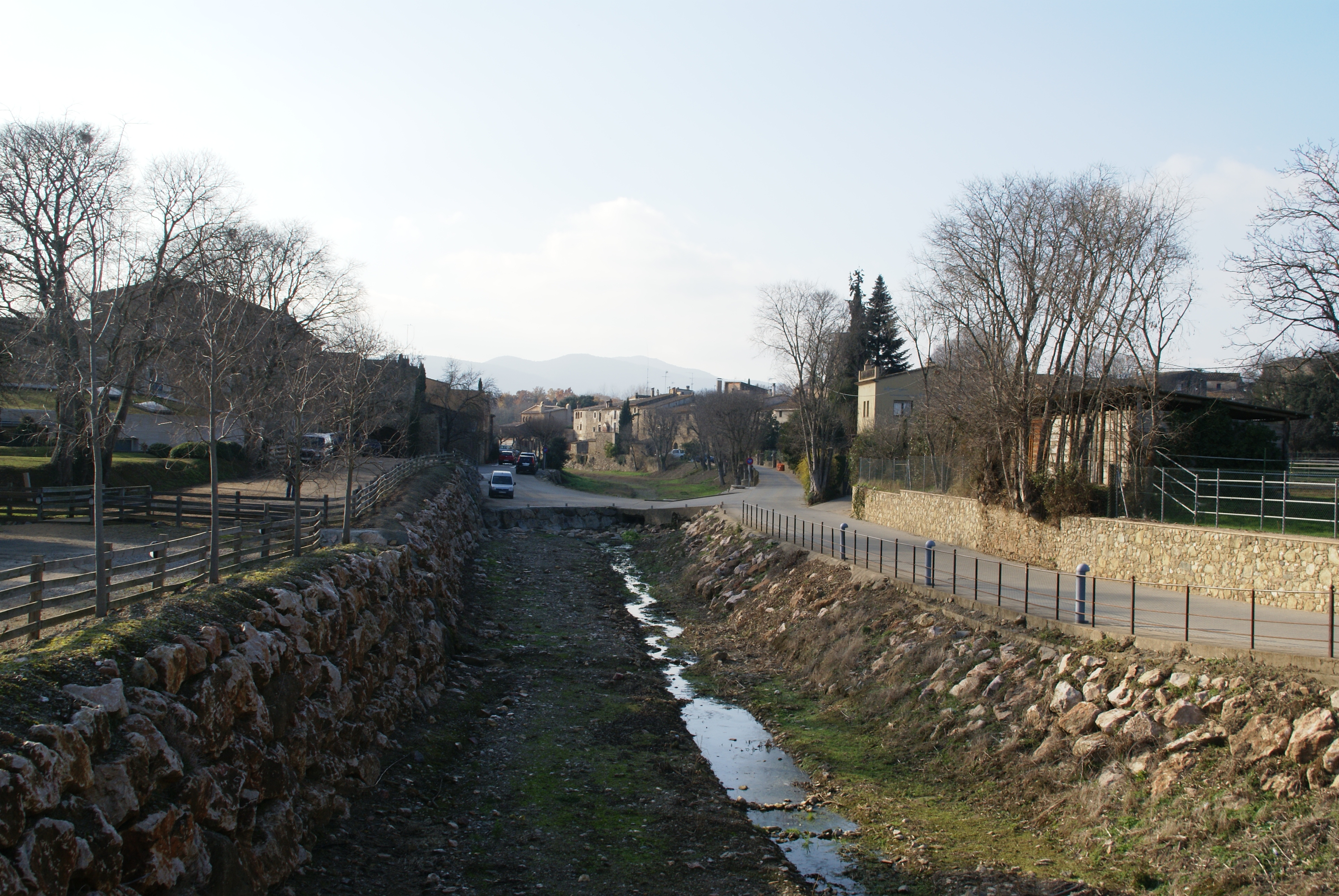
The Rissec river

- Church of Sant Genís de Monells
- Jaume I Square
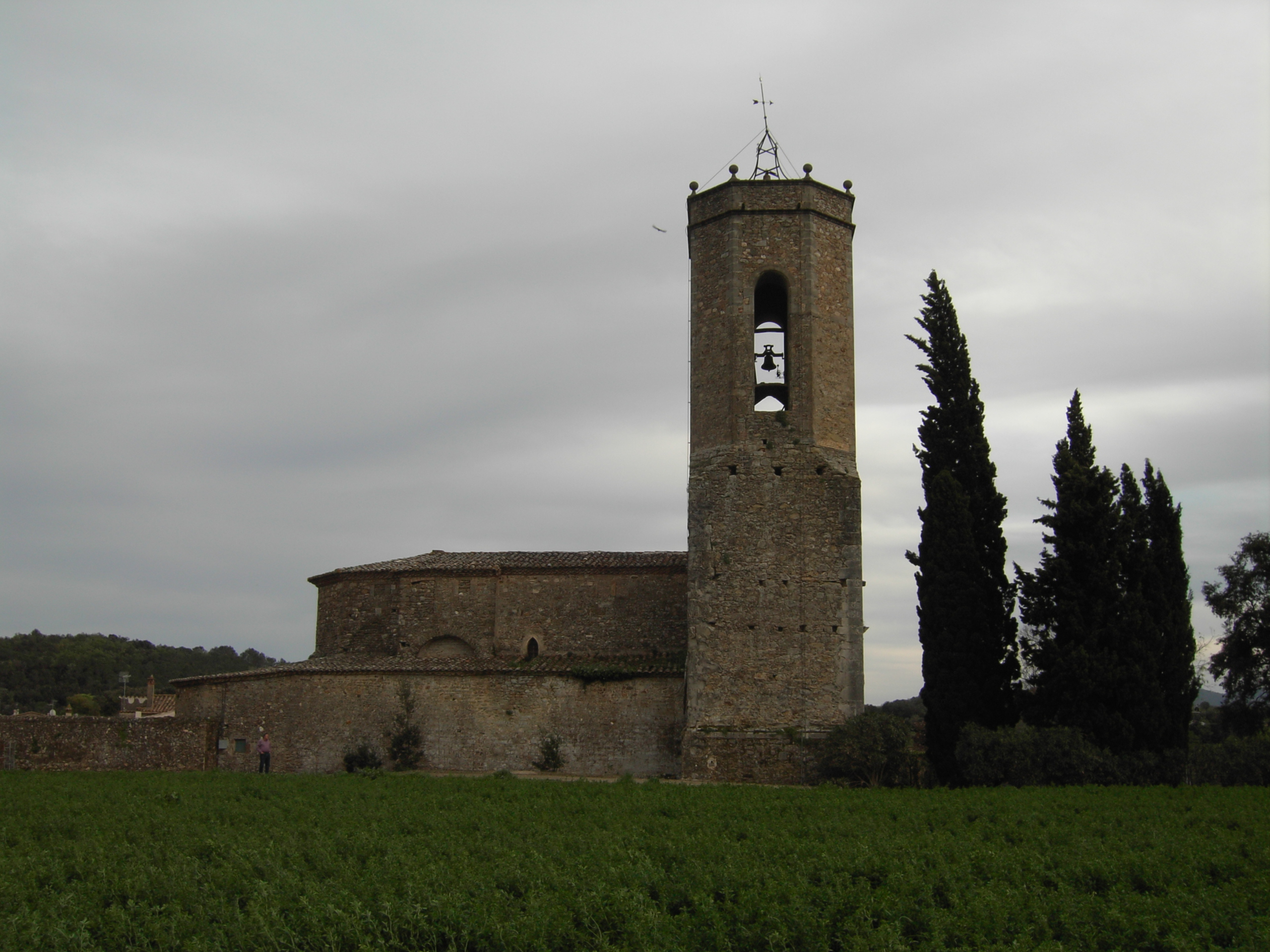
Church of Sant Genís

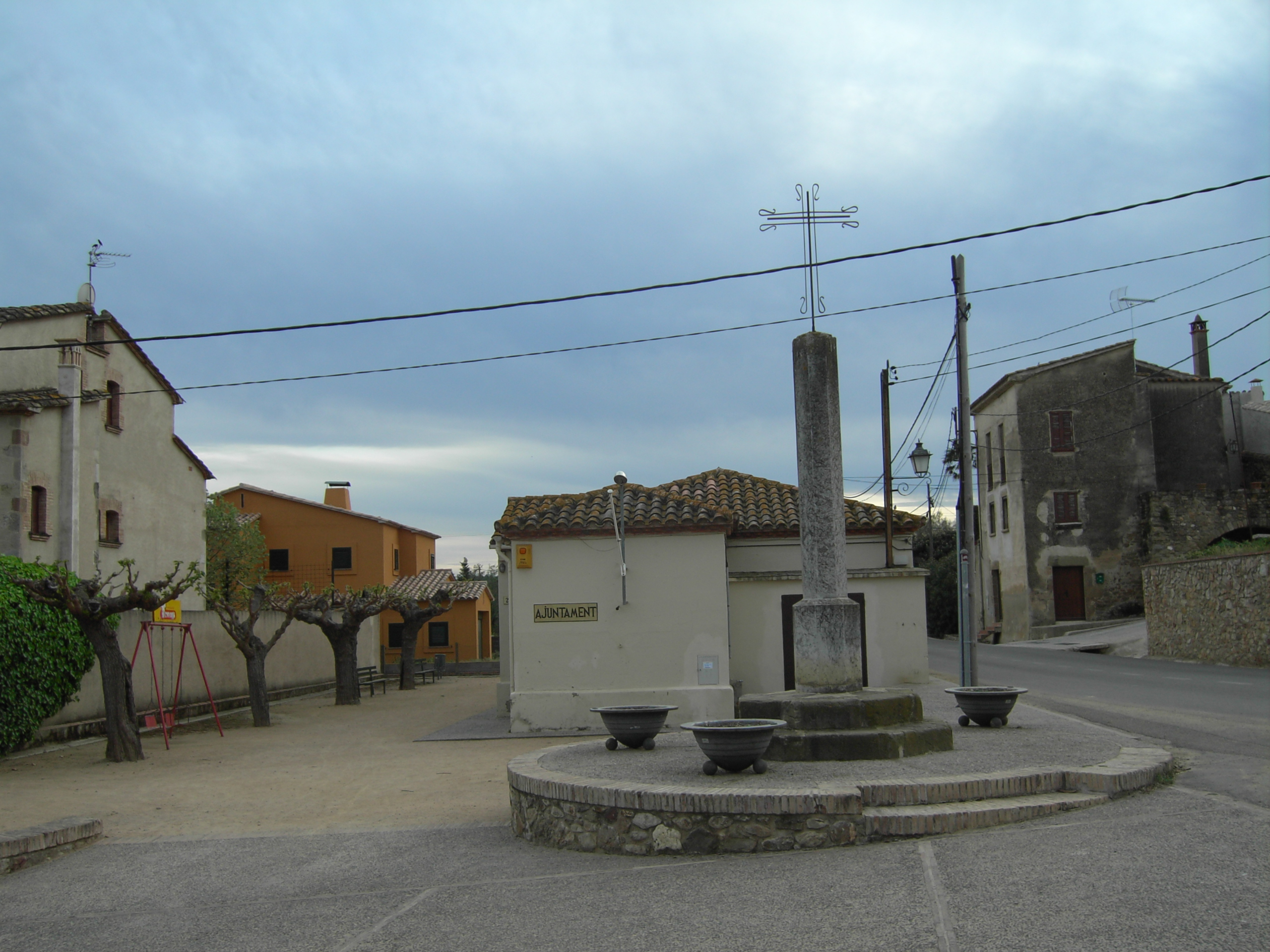
Town Hall Square

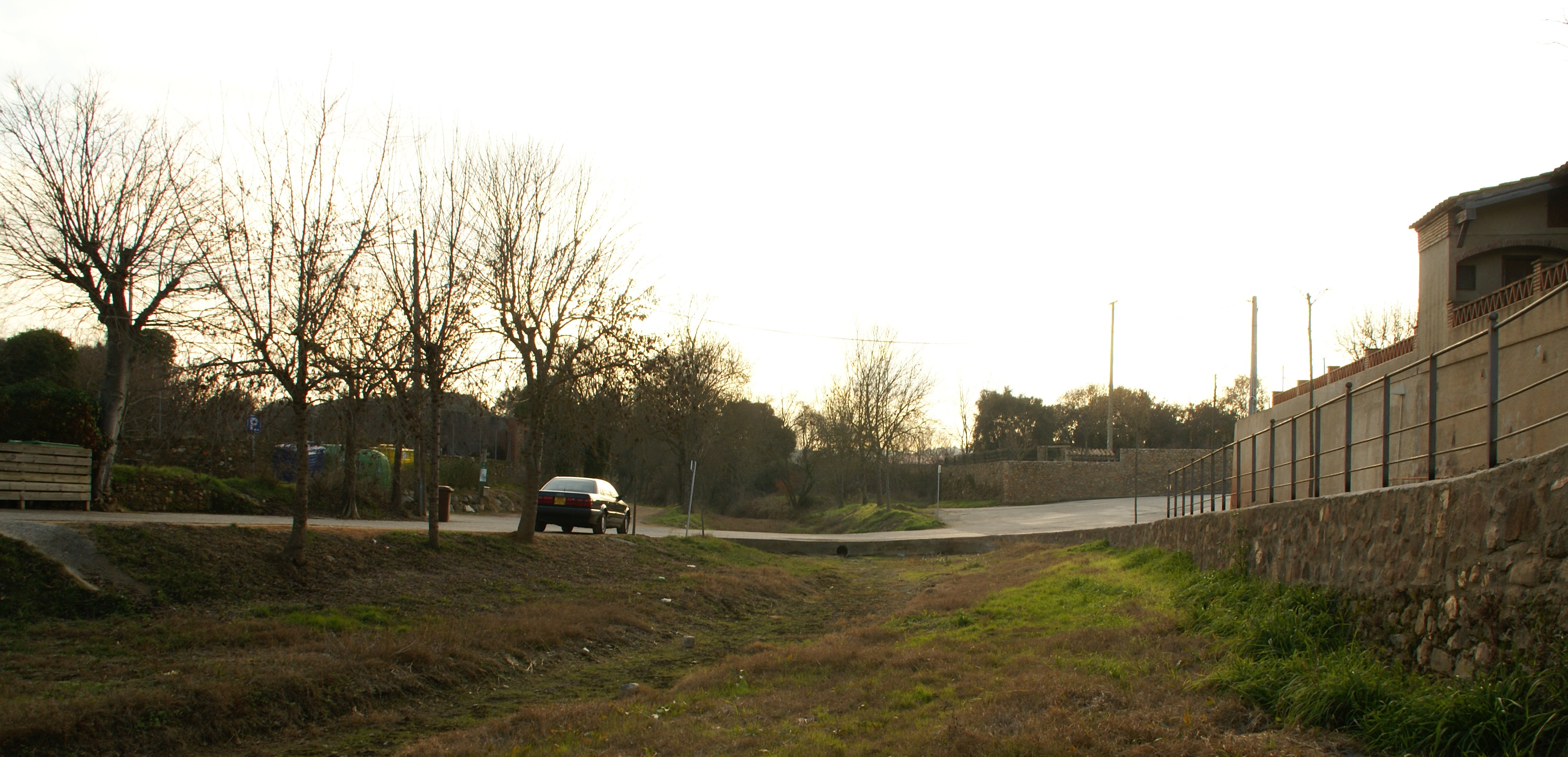
Ford to Rissec

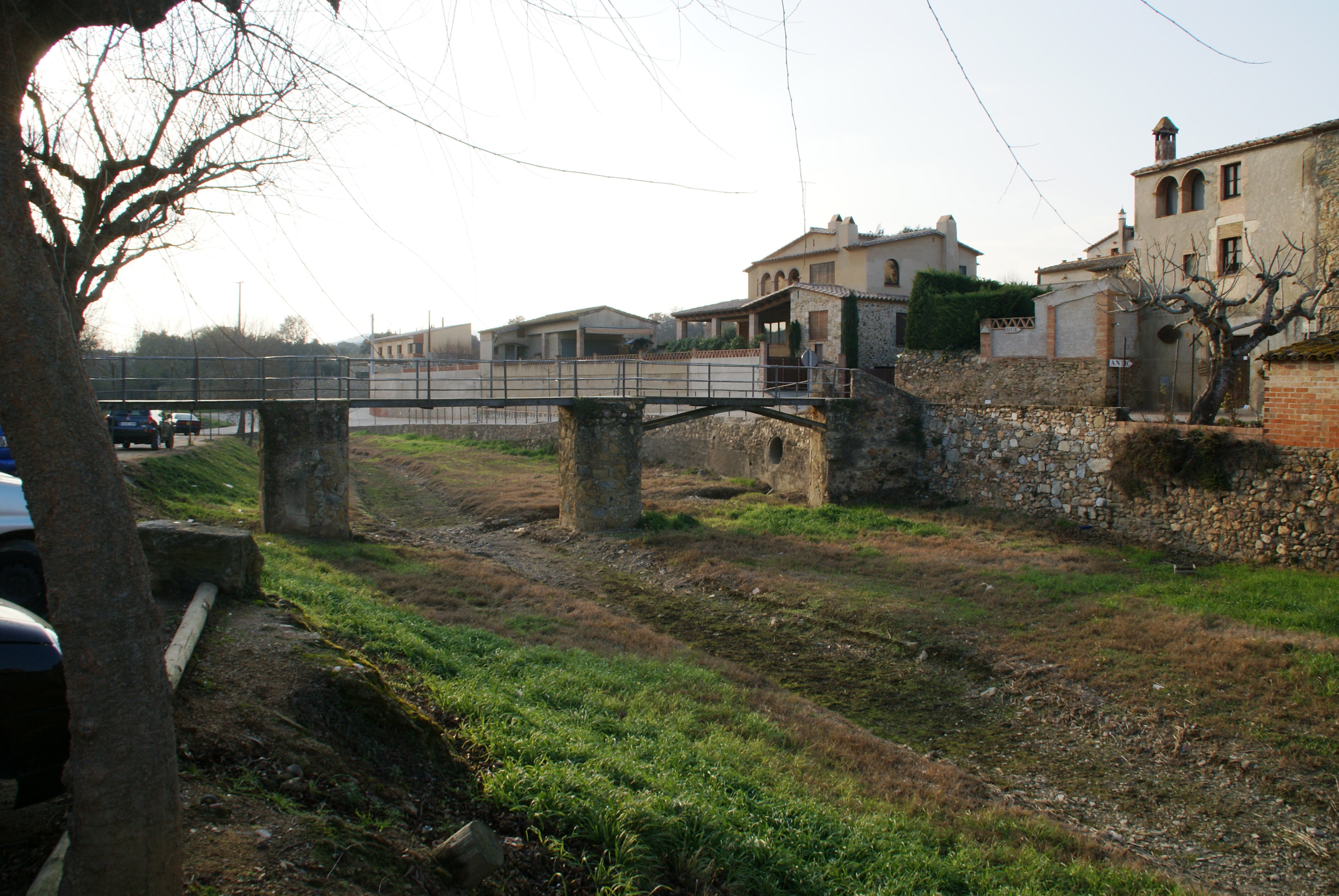
Bridge to Rissec
