= A Bright Sun =

- Theatrical release poster
- Catalan: Un sol radiant
- Directed by: Mònica Cambra Domínguez; Ariadna Fortuny Cardona
- Screenplay by: Ariadna Fortuny Cardona; Clàudia Garcia de Dios
- Starring: Laia Artigas; Nunu Sales; Núria Prims; Jaume Villalta
- Cinematography: Àssia J. La-Roca Pérez
- Edited by: Mónica Cambra Domínguez; Lucía Herrera Pérez
- Music by: Guillermo Martorell
- Production company: Atiende Films
- Distributed by: Begin Again Films
- Release dates: 24 March 2023 (D'A); 17 May 2024 (Spain)
- Country: Spain
- Language: Catalan

A Bright Sun (Catalan: Un sol radiant) is a 2023 Spanish apocalyptic coming-of-age drama film directed by Mònica Cambra and Ariadna Fortuny. It stars Laia Artigas, Nunu Sales, Núria Prims, and Jaume Villalta. It is shot in Catalan.

== Plot ==
The plot depicts how 11-year-old Mila faces her last days before the end of the world.

== Cast ==
- Laia Artigas as Mila
- Núria Sales as Íngrid
- Núria Prims as Alicia
- Jaume Villalta as Gabriel

== Production ==
An Atiende Films production, the film was born out as a final degree project of five Pompeu Fabra University alumni (Mònica Cambra, Ariadna Fortuny, Clàudia Garcia de Dios, Lucía Herrera, and Mònica Tort). It was shot in locations of the Baix Camp comarca of Catalonia, including Masboquera and L'Hospitalet de l'Infant (Vandellòs i l'Hospitalet de l'Infant), Colldejou, Toll de l'Olla (Farena), Pratdip, La Mussara, and Remullà.

== Release ==
The film premiered in the 'Talents' strand of the Barcelona-based D'A Film Festival on 24 March 2023. Its festival run also included a screening at the Gijón International Film Festival. Distributed by Begin Again Films, it was released theatrically in Spain on 17 May 2024.

== Reception ==
Rubén Romero Santos of Cinemanía rated the film 4 out of 5 stars, writing that "Carla Simón's haptic delicacy and Lars von Trier's unredeemed nihilism" are surprisingly combined in the film.

Manuel J. Lombardo of Diario de Sevilla awarded the film 2 stars, writing that everything in the film "seems to respond to a layout that is very much prefabricated and déjà vu".

María Cantó of El Cultural rated the film 3½ out of 5 stars, declaring it "a delicate and simple film in its mise-en-scène, but ambitious in its existentialist approaches".

== Accolades ==
Year	Award	Category	Nominee(s)	Result	Ref.
2025	17th Gaudí Awards	Best New Director	Mònica Cambra Domínguez, Ariadna Fortuny Cardona	Nominated	
2025	12th Feroz Awards	Arrebato Special Award (Fiction Film)		Nominated	

== See also ==
- List of Spanish films of 2024
