= 2006 Rally Catalunya =

Rallying motorsport event

2006 Rally Catalunya 42º Rally RACC Catalunya - Costa Daurada
Round 4 of the 2006 World Rally Championship
← Previous event	Next event →
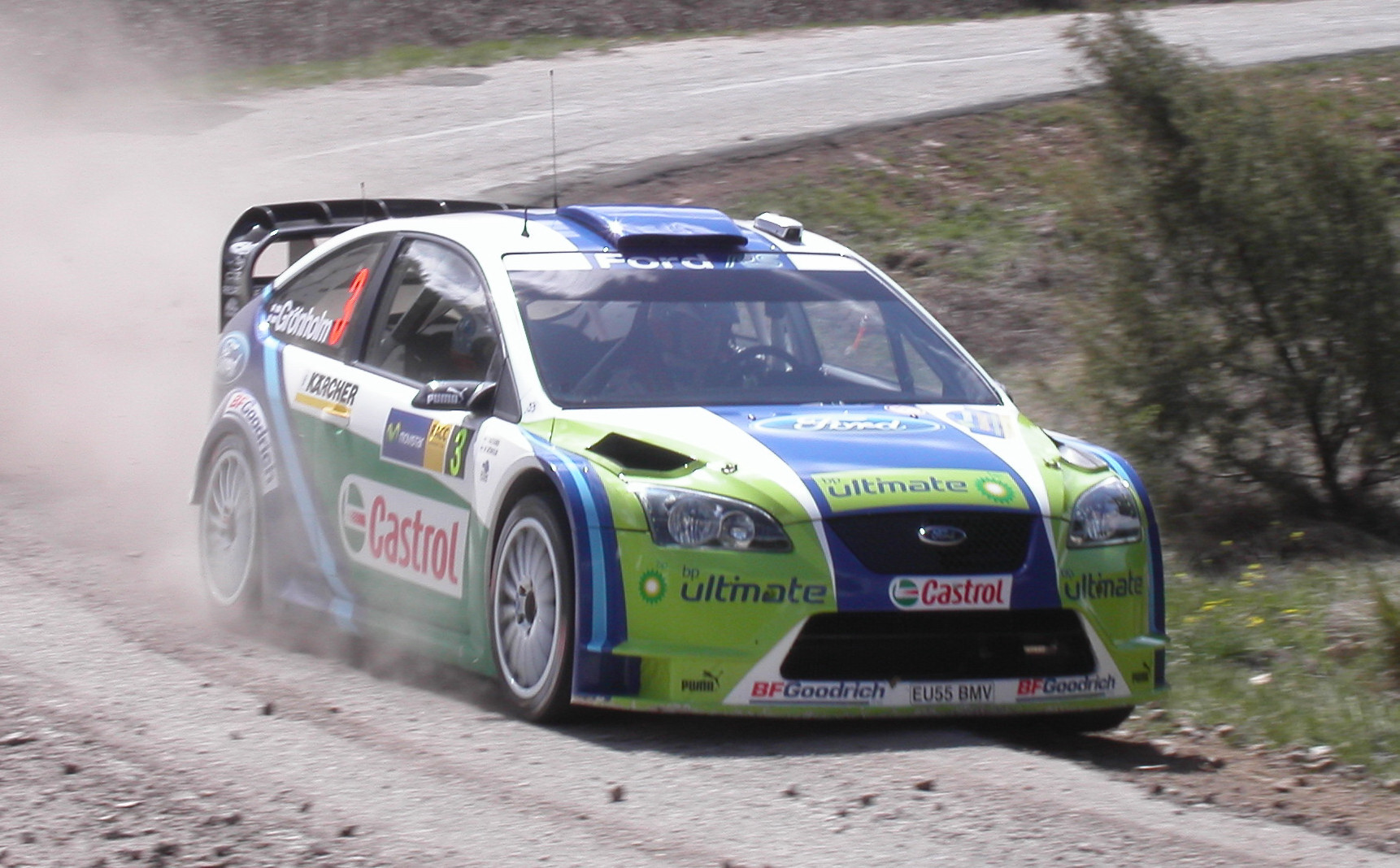
- Marcus Grönholm
- Rally base: Salou
- Dates run: March 24 – 26 2006
- Stages: 16 (359.54 km; 223.41 miles)
- Stage surface: Tarmac
- Overall distance: 1,002.47 km (622.91 miles)

Statistics
- Crews: 66 at start, 56 at finish

Overall results
- Overall winner: (France) Sébastien Loeb (Belgium) Kronos Total Citroën World Rally Team

The 42º Rally RACC Catalunya - Costa Daurada, the fourth round of the 2006 World Rally Championship season, took place from March 24 to 26, 2006.

== Report ==
The rally was the first all-tarmac event of the season. The event was marred by an accident in the JWRC category which resulted in the death of the co-driver Jörg Bastuck. Eventually the rally saw the second win of the season for the reigning world champion Sébastien Loeb, although the early pacesetter was Ford's Marcus Grönholm. After winning the first three stages, he suffered turbo problems on stage five but fought back from tenth place to eventually take third place. Ahead of Grönholm was the first podium for Spain's Dani Sordo with a fast run that was publicly acknowledged by Loeb. Further down the field, the twice previous Rally Catalunya winner Gilles Panizzi disappointed with a tenth-place finish. Panizzi promptly left the Red Bull Škoda Team and has not competed in a WRC round since.

== Results ==
Pos.	Driver	Co-driver	Car	Time	Difference	Points
WRC
1.	(France) Sébastien Loeb	(Monaco) Daniel Elena	Citroën Xsara WRC	3:22:01.7	0.0	10
2.	(Spain) Dani Sordo	(Spain) Marc Martí	Citroën Xsara WRC	3:22:49.9	48.2	8
3.	(Finland) Marcus Grönholm	(Finland) Timo Rautiainen	Ford Focus RS WRC 06	3:23:47.5	1:45.8	6
4.	(France) Alex Bengué	(France) Caroline Escudero	Peugeot 307 WRC	3:24:03.6	2:01.9	5
5.	(Czech Republic) Jan Kopecký	(Czech Republic) Filip Schovánek	Škoda Fabia WRC	3:24:58.9	2:57.2	4
6.	(Belgium) François Duval	(France) Patrick Pivato	Škoda Fabia WRC	3:25:39.5	3:37.8	3
7.	(Norway) Petter Solberg	(United Kingdom) Phil Mills	Subaru Impreza WRC2006	3:25:49.9	3:48.2	2
8.	(France) Stéphane Sarrazin	(Belgium) Stéphane Prévot	Subaru Impreza WRC2006	3:26:38.1	4:36.4	1
JWRC
1.(17.)	(Czech Republic) Martin Prokop	(Czech Republic) Jan Tománek	Citroën C2 S1600	3:46:04.0	0.0	10
2.(18.)	(Belgium) Bernd Casier	(Belgium) Frédéric Miclotte	Renault Clio S1600	3:46:46.3	42.3	8
3.(19.)	(United Kingdom) Kris Meeke	(United Kingdom) Glenn Patterson	Citroën C2 S1600	3:47:09.4	1:05.4	6
4.(21.)	(Slovakia) Jozef Béreš jun.	(Czech Republic) Petr Starý	Suzuki Ignis S1600	3:48:02.1	1:58.1	5
5.(24.)	(Poland) Michał Kościuszko	(Poland) Jarek Baran	Suzuki Ignis S1600	3:50:34.6	4:30.6	4
6.(25.)	(Zimbabwe) Conrad Rautenbach	(United Kingdom) David Senior	Renault Clio S1600	3:50:53.1	4:49.1	3
7.(26.)	(Turkey) Fatih Kara	(Turkey) Cem Bakançocukları	Renault Clio S1600	3:52:00.3	5:56.3	2
8.(30.)	(France) Brice Tirabassi	(France) Jacques-Julien Renucci	Citroën C2 S1600	3:54:45.4	8:41.4	1

== Retirements ==
- (Spain) Xavier Pons - accident (SS10)
- (Italy) Luca Betti - accident (SS12)
- (France) Julien Pressac - engine (SS12)
- (United Kingdom) Barry Clark - withdrawn (SS2)
- (Germany) Aaron Burkart - accident (SS2)

== Special stages ==
All dates and times are CET (UTC+1) from 24 to 25 March 2006 and CEST (UTC+2) in 26 March 2006.

Day	Stage	Time	Name	Length	Winner	Time	Avg. spd.	Rally leader
1 (24 MAR)	SS1	08:05	Querol 1	25.43 km	(Finland) M. Grönholm	13:36.7	112.1 km/h	(Finland) M. Grönholm
1 (24 MAR)	SS2	08:53	el Montmell 1	24.13 km	(Finland) M. Grönholm	12:35.6	115.0 km/h	(Finland) M. Grönholm
1 (24 MAR)	SS3	12:33	Querol 2	25.43 km	(Finland) M. Grönholm	13:44.4	111.1 km/h	(Finland) M. Grönholm
1 (24 MAR)	SS4	13:21	el Montmell 2	24.13 km	(France) S. Loeb	12:31.8	115.6 km/h	(Finland) M. Grönholm
1 (24 MAR)	SS5	16:31	Colldejou	26.51 km	(France) S. Loeb	15:42.1	101.3 km/h	(France) S. Loeb
1 (24 MAR)	SS6	17:24	Riudecaynes	11.60 km	(France) S. Loeb	7:45.3	89.8 km/h	(France) S. Loeb
2 (25 MAR)	SS7	07:50	Duesaigues 1	11.50 km	(Finland) M. Grönholm	7:47.8	88.5 km/h	(France) S. Loeb
2 (25 MAR)	SS8	08:36	Vilaplana 1	28.32 km	(Finland) M. Grönholm	16:36.4	102.4 km/h	(France) S. Loeb
2 (25 MAR)	SS9	09:59	Margalef - la Palma d'Ebre 1	15.85 km	(France) S. Loeb	9:35.2	99.2 km/h	(France) S. Loeb
2 (25 MAR)	SS10	13:09	Duesaigues 2	11.50 km	(Spain) D. Sordo	8:04.7	85.4 km/h	(France) S. Loeb
2 (25 MAR)	SS11	13:55	Vilaplana 2	28.32 km	(Finland) M. Grönholm	16:44.7	101.5 km/h	(France) S. Loeb
2 (25 MAR)	SS12	15:18	Margalef - la Palma d'Ebre 2	15.85 km	(France) S. Loeb	9:33.2	99.6 km/h	(France) S. Loeb
3 (26 MAR)	SS13	07:53	el Lloar - la Figuera 1	22.43 km	(Finland) M. Grönholm	12:41.5	106.0 km/h	(France) S. Loeb
3 (26 MAR)	SS14	09:05	Pratdip 1	26.47 km	(Finland) M. Grönholm	15:36.5	101.8 km/h	(France) S. Loeb
3 (26 MAR)	SS15	11:56	el Lloar - la Figuera 2	22.43 km	(Finland) M. Grönholm	12:41.5	106.0 km/h	(France) S. Loeb
3 (26 MAR)	SS16	13:08	Pratdip 2	26.47 km	(Finland) M. Grönholm	15:40.6	101.4 km/h	(France) S. Loeb

== Championship standings after the event ==
=== Drivers' championship ===
Pos	Driver	MON (Monaco)	SWE (Sweden)	MEX (Mexico)	ESP (Spain)	FRA (France)	ARG (Argentina)	ITA (Italy)	GRC (Greece)	GER (Germany)	FIN (Finland)	JPN (Japan)	CYP (Cyprus)	TUR (Turkey)	AUS (Australia)	NZL (New Zealand)	GBR (United Kingdom)	Pts
1	(France) Sébastien Loeb	2	2	1	1													36
2	(Finland) Marcus Grönholm	1	1	8	3													27
3	(Spain) Dani Sordo	8	16	4	2													14
4	(Austria) Manfred Stohl	4	18	3	12													11
5	(Norway) Petter Solberg	Ret	Ret	2	7													10
6	(Finland) Toni Gardemeister	3																6
6	(Sweden) Daniel Carlsson		3															6
8	(Italy) Gigi Galli	Ret	4															5
8	(France) Alex Bengué				4													5
8	(France) Stéphane Sarrazin	5			8													5
8	(Norway) Henning Solberg	Ret	8	5														5
8	(Australia) Chris Atkinson	6	11	7	11													5
13	(Sweden) Thomas Rådström		5															4
13	(Czech Republic) Jan Kopecký	11	13		5													4
15	(Finland) Kosti Katajamäki		6															3
15	(Republic of Ireland) Gareth MacHale	16		6	Ret													3
15	(Belgium) François Duval	Ret			6													3
18	(Finland) Mikko Hirvonen	7	12	14	9													2
18	(Spain) Xavier Pons	9	7	Ret	Ret													2
Pos	Driver	MON (Monaco)	SWE (Sweden)	MEX (Mexico)	ESP (Spain)	FRA (France)	ARG (Argentina)	ITA (Italy)	GRC (Greece)	GER (Germany)	FIN (Finland)	JPN (Japan)	CYP (Cyprus)	TUR (Turkey)	AUS (Australia)	NZL (New Zealand)	GBR (United Kingdom)	Pts

Key
Colour	Result
Gold	Winner
Silver	2nd place
Bronze	3rd place
Green	Points finish
Blue	Non-points finish
Blue	Non-classified finish (NC)
Purple	Did not finish (Ret)
Black	Excluded (EX)
Black	Disqualified (DSQ)
White	Did not start (DNS)
White	Cancelled (C)
Blank	Withdrew entry from the event (WD)

=== Manufacturers' championship ===
Rank	Manufacturer	Event																Total points
Rank	Manufacturer	MON (Monaco)	SWE (Sweden)	MEX (Mexico)	ESP (Spain)	FRA (France)	ARG (Argentina)	ITA (Italy)	GRC (Greece)	GER (Germany)	FIN (Finland)	JPN (Japan)	CYP (Cyprus)	TUR (Turkey)	AUS (Australia)	NZL (New Zealand)	GBR (United Kingdom)	Total points
1	Kronos Total Citroën World Rally Team	11	13	10	10													44
2	BP Ford World Rally Team	14	12	4	12													42
3	Subaru World Rally Team	5	3	12	11													31
4	OMV-Peugeot Norway	6	4	11														21
5	Stobart VK M-Sport Ford Rally Team	0	7	2	1													10
6	Red Bull Škoda Team	3	0		5													8
