= Prades Mountains =

Large calcareous mountain

- Muntanyes de Prades
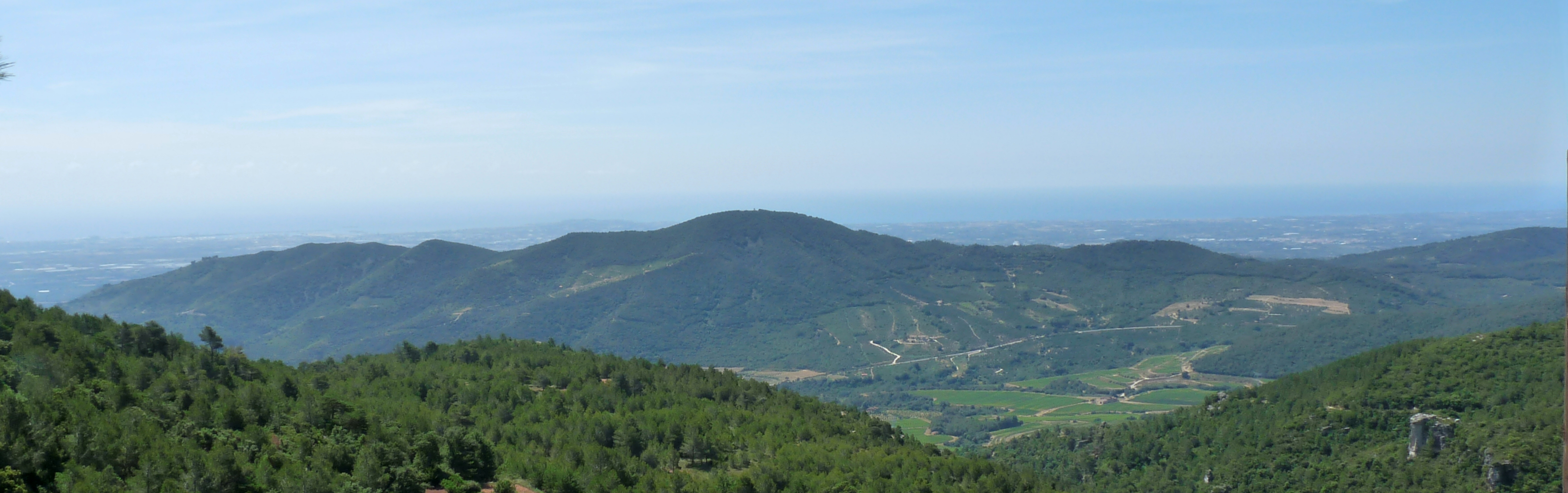
- View over the Puig d'en Cama

Highest point
- Elevation: 1,203 m (3,947 ft)
- Coordinates: 41°17′34″N 1°02′42″E

Geography
- Location within Catalonia
- Location: Conca de Barberà, Garrigues, Priorat (Catalonia)
- Parent range: Catalan Pre-Coastal Range

Geology
- Mountain type: Limestone

Climbing
- Easiest route: From Prades

Prades Mountains, also known as Muntanyes de Prades, is a large calcareous mountain massif straddling the comarcas of Alt Camp, Baix Camp, Conca de Barberà, Garrigues and Priorat, in Catalonia, Spain. They are a Site of Community Importance.

These mountains have characteristic large and rounded rocky outcrops. They are mostly heavily forested with oak and pine trees, and the non-native chestnut tree has adapted to the local forests.

== Geography ==
The range runs in an east to west direction and is part of the Catalan Pre-Coastal Range. The main peak is Tossal de la Baltasana (1203 m), other summits are Mola d'Estat (1127 m), Mola dels Quatre Termes (1117 m), La Mussara (1055 m), and Punta de la Barrina (1013 m). The 731 m high Tossal de la Creu is a visible landmark from the Poblet Monastery, located at the foot of the range.

The Francolí River has its source in these mountains as well as other minor local rivers.

== Municipalities ==
The Prades Mountains are a large massif with many smaller subranges extending over the following municipal terms: L'Albiol, Alcover, L'Aleixar, Alforja, Almoster, Arbolí, Capafonts, Cornudella de Montsant, L'Espluga de Francolí, La Febró, Montblanc, Mont-ral, La Pobla de Cérvoles, Prades, La Riba, La Selva del Camp, Ulldemolins, Vallclara, Vilaplana, Vilanova de Prades, Vilaverd, El Vilosell and Vimbodí i Poblet.

== Gallery ==
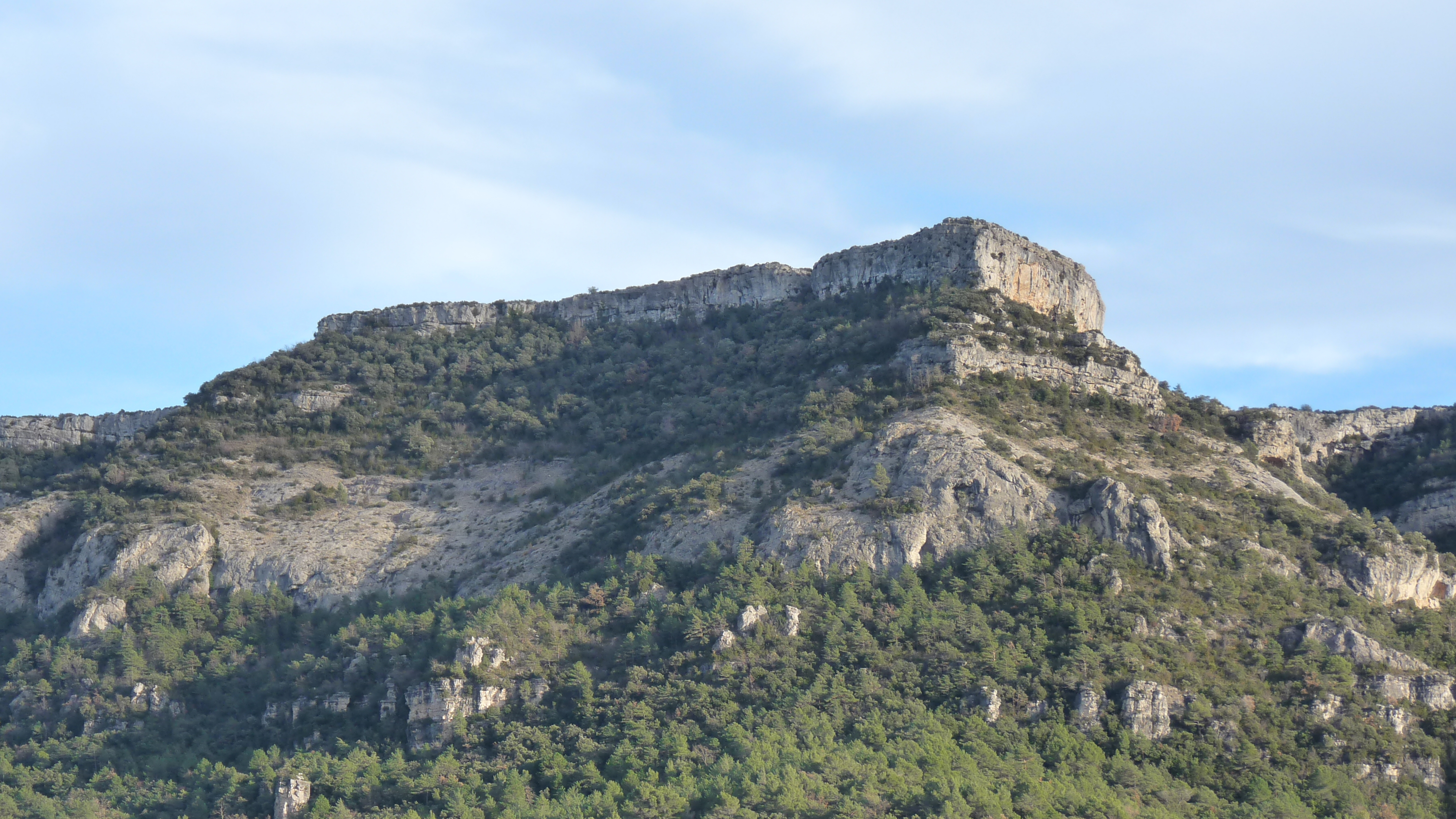
The massive Pena Roja

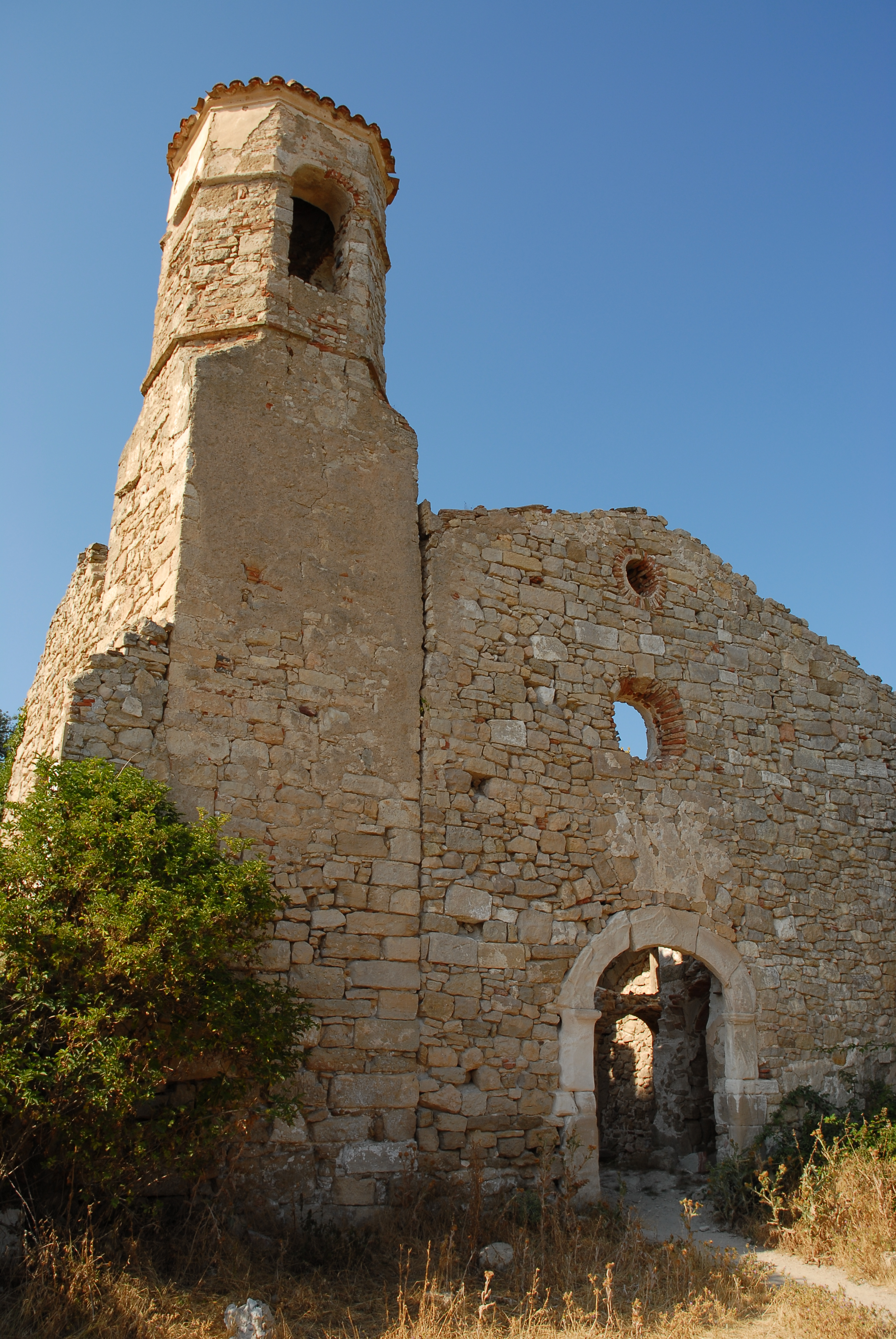
The ruined church of La Mussara, an abandoned town in the Serra de la Mussara, a subrange of the Prades Mountains

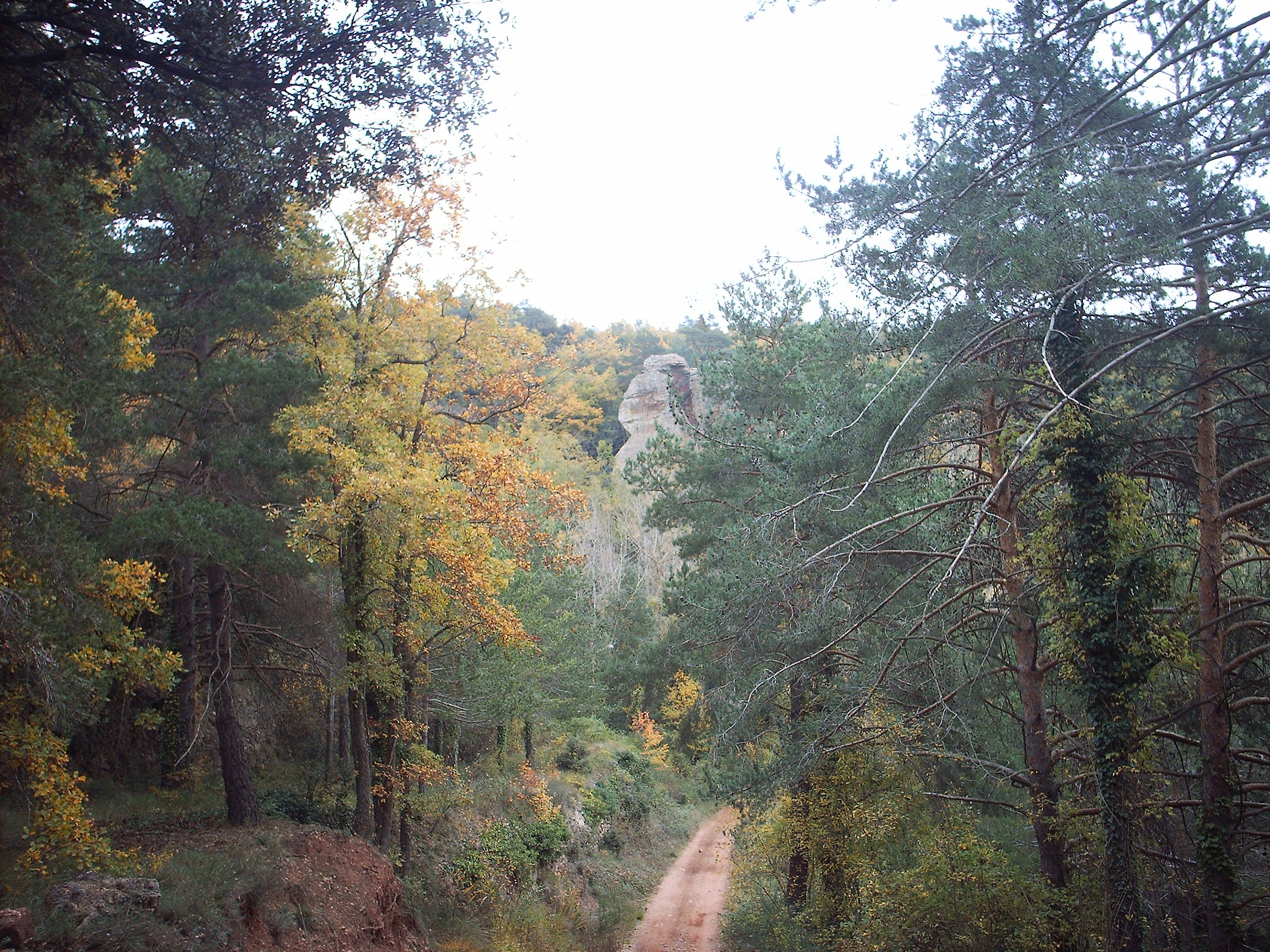
A forest near Capafonts

== See also ==
- Poblet Monastery
- Catalan Pre-Coastal Range
- Mountains of Catalonia

== Bibliography ==
- Domingo, Màrius. Muntanyes de Prades. Excursions naturals. Valls: Cossetània, 2000 ISBN 84-89890-82-X
- Domingo, M. i Borau, A. Muntanyes de Prades, Paisatge i Fauna. Valls: Cossetània, 1998
- Ferré Masip, Rafael. Les Muntanyes de Prades. Guia itinerària. Barcelona: Piolet, 2001 ISBN 84-923984-9-3
- Insa, Josep. Les Muntanyes de Prades. Caminant de poble a poble. Valls: Cossetània, 2005 ISBN 84-9791-124-5
