= Mola dels Quatre Termes =

Mountain in Catalonia, Spain

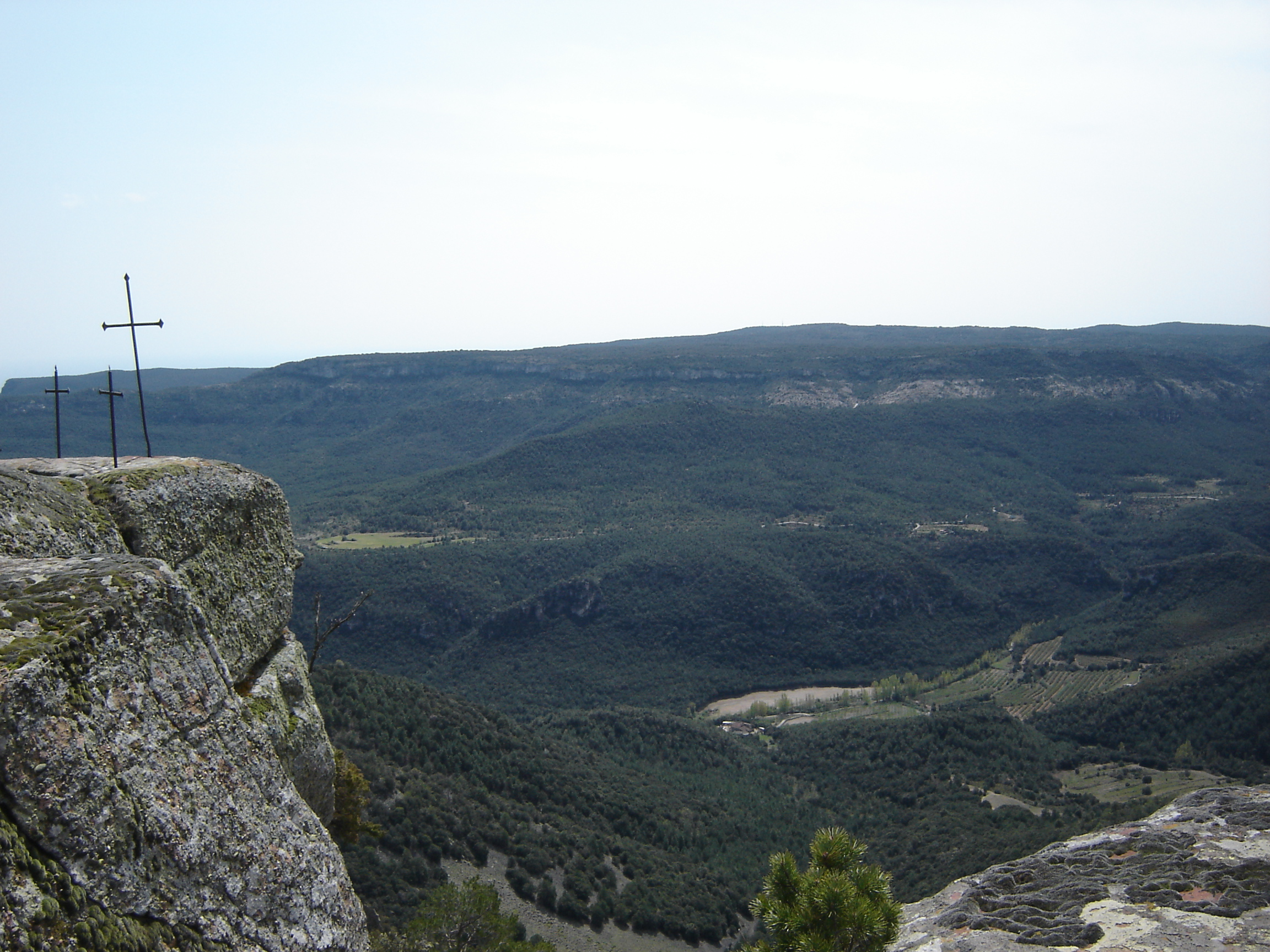
- The three crosses atop the mountain

Highest point
- Elevation: 1,117 m (3,665 ft)
- Listing: Mountains of Catalonia
- Coordinates: 41°19′44″N 1°3′57″E

Geography
- Location within Catalonia
- Location: Baix Camp, Conca de Barberà, Catalonia
- Parent range: Prades Mountains

Climbing
- First ascent: Unknown
- Easiest route: from Vimbodí i Poblet or Montblanc

Mola dels Quatre Termes, also known as Mola d'Estat, is a summit in the Serra del Bosc range, Prades Mountains, Catalonia, Spain. It has an elevation of 1,117 metres above sea level.
