= Castellvell del Camp =

- Municipality
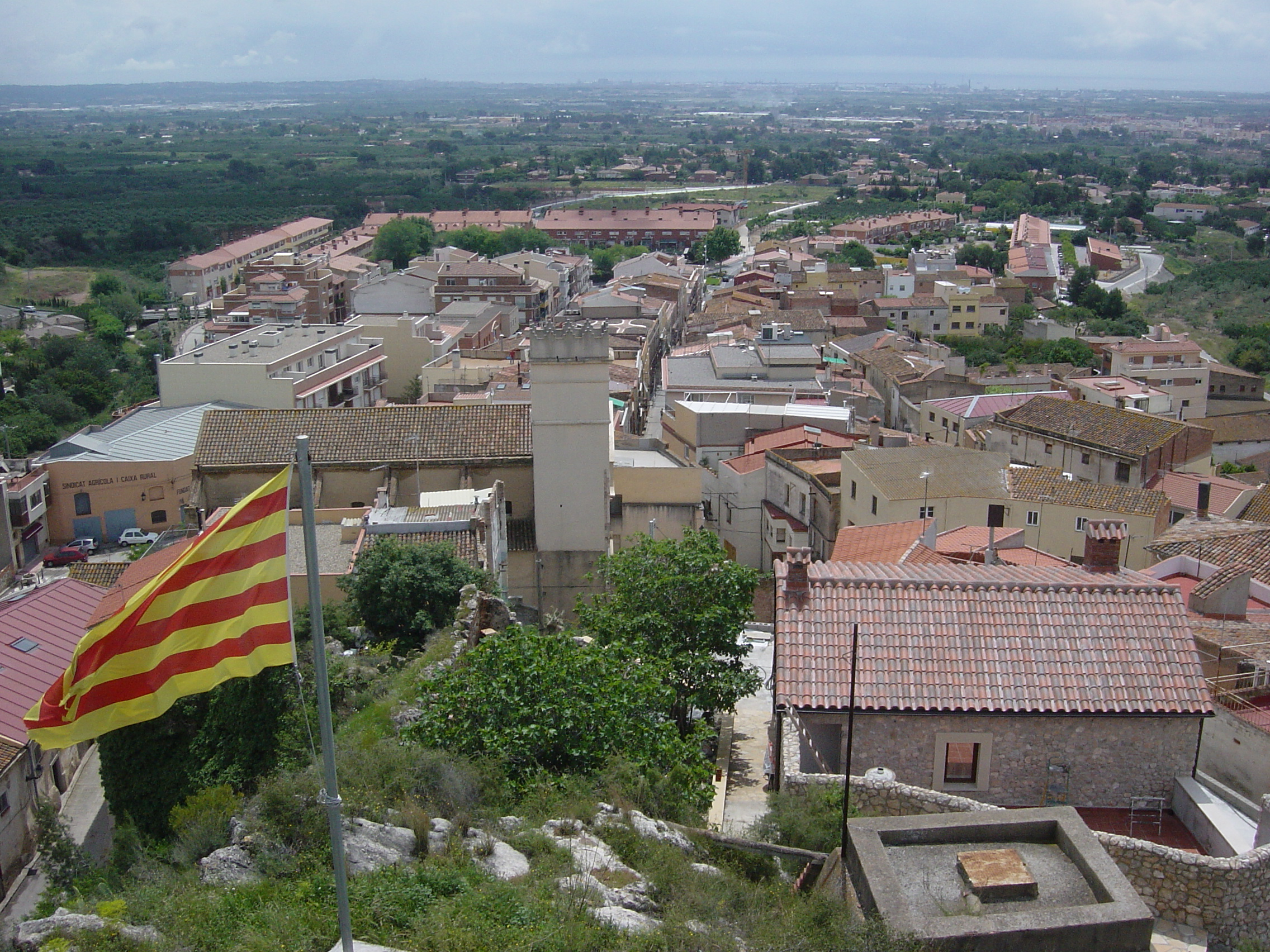
- Castellvell del Camp

- Location in Catalonia
- Coordinates: 41°10′57″N 1°5′53″E
- Country: Spain
- Community: Catalonia
- Province: Tarragona
- Comarca: Baix Camp

Government
  - Mayor: Josep Manel Sabaté i Papiol (Esquerra Republicana)

Area
  - Total: 5.2 km^{2} (2.0 sq mi)

Population (2025-01-01)
  - Total: 3,002
  - Density: 580/km^{2} (1,500/sq mi)
- Website: www.castellvelldelcamp.cat

Castellvell del Camp (Catalan pronunciation: [kəsˌteʎˈveʎ dəl ˈkam]) is a village in the province of Tarragona and autonomous community of Catalonia, Spain. It has a population of 3,002 (register office, 2025).
