= Almoster =

- Municipality
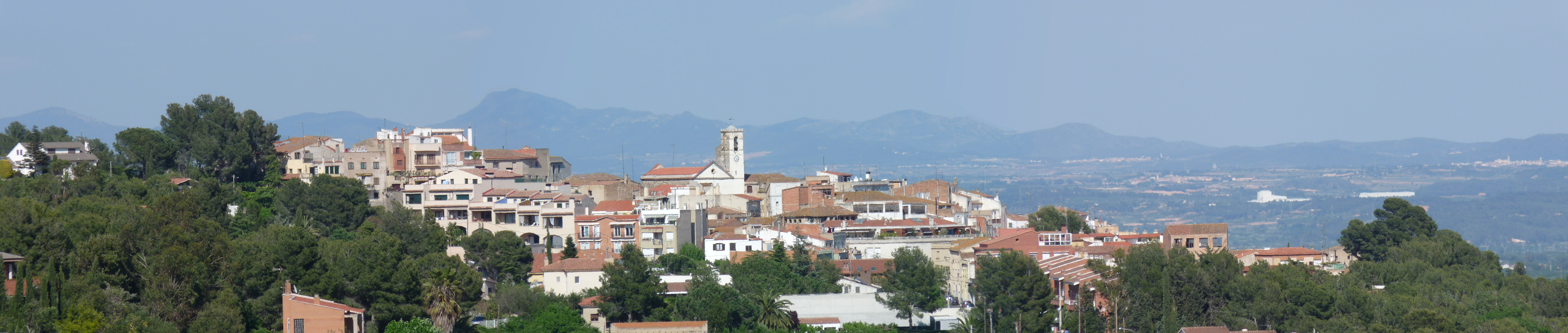

- Coat of arms

- Location in Catalonia
- Coordinates: 41°12′N 1°07′E
- Country: ESP
- Province: Tarragona Province
- Municipalities of Spain: Catalonia Catalonia
- Regions of Spain: Bajo Campo

Government
  - Type: ERC
  - Mayor: Àngel Xifré Arroyo (2015)

Area
  - Total: 6.0 km^{2} (2.3 sq mi)
- Elevation: 333 m (1,093 ft)

Population (2025-01-01)
  - Total: 1,384
  - Density: 230/km^{2} (600/sq mi)
- Postal code: 43393
- Website: www.almoster.cat

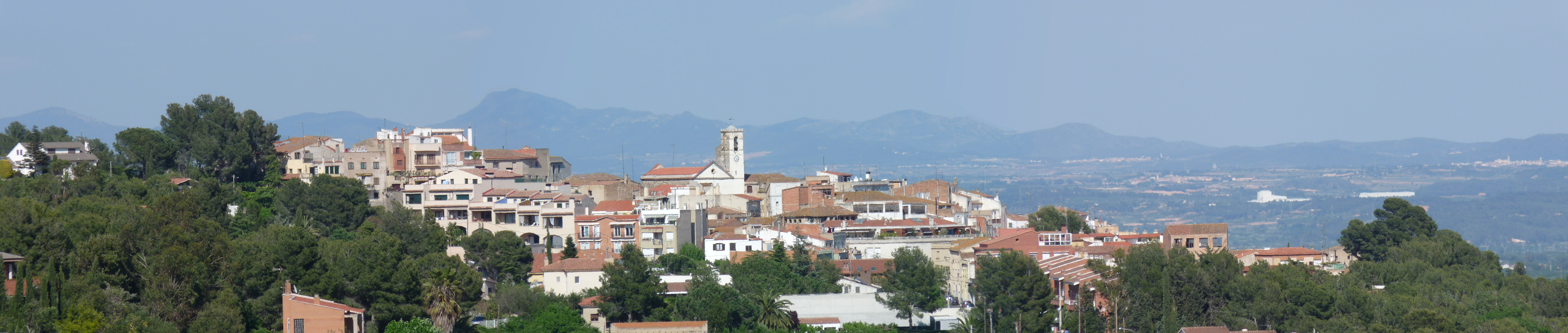
Almoster

Almoster (Catalan pronunciation: [əlmusˈte]) is a village in the province of Tarragona and autonomous community of Catalonia, Spain. It has a population of 1,384 (register office, 2025).

== Location ==
Almoster is located to the south of Catalonia and north of Tarragona. Its situation in the country is in the northeast of Spain. It is located 4 km from Reus, 19 km from Tarragona and 110 km from Barcelona.

== Geography and climate ==
Almoster's terraine is rugged in the north due to the presence of mountains that are a buttress of the Prades Mountains. All the terraine belongs to the pre-coastal range. The highest point of the town center is 320 m above sea level, the parish church of San Miguel, is located at an altitude, in the lower part of the terraine, which is about 290 m above sea level, while the highest point of the municipality is 700 m above sea level, on the southern slopes of the Puig d'en Cama, a hill that dominates the landscape of the area and whose apex at 717 m above sea level is located in the neighboring municipality of La Selva del Campo.

Its climate is dry Mediterranean, with low rainfall in the summer and occasionally heavy rainfall in spring and autumn. The driest month is July, with an average rainfall of only 15 mm, and September is usually the wettest, with an average of about 75 mm. The average annual precipitation barely reaches 500 mm. The most mountainous part of the township has a continental Mediterranean climate and more rain as there is a small thermal contrast with the more southerly and lower elevation. The average temperature of the warmest month, August, is about 24 º and the coldest month, January, is about -2 to 0^{0}.

== History ==
In 1164, in the record population of La Selva del Campo the town of Mosterio mentioned. In 1204 loco vocato Mosterium was mentioned while the toponym Almoster does not appear in any document before 1582. It is believed that the origin of the name is the Arabic term Munastir which means "border convent."

During the Middle Ages the town was walled but nothing remains of these walls. It had an important Jewish colony. From 1547 it was part of the Commune of Campo bringing together various municipalities of Campo de Tarragona.

The municipality was positioned in favor of the Archduke Charles in 1710. The Carrasclet guerrilla group acted with force in the area, assaulting and killing numerous Castilian troops.

In 1854 the municipality was expanded with land formerly owned by Albiol. In 1850 the council was joined with that of Reus, an agreement which was never formalized.

== Symbols ==
In early 2009, the shield of the municipality was not yet standardized and formalized by the Generalitat de Catalunya. Traditionally it used, oval and red stamp showing an inscription and a gold cross and a confusing picture at the bottom.

== Culture ==
The parish church is dedicated to San Miguel and was built in 1704 in a simple style. There are hardly any traces of the original ornamentation as it was destroyed in 1936. One of the objects that were lost was the altar dedicated to St. Peter, the work of sculptor Balthasar Bonifaç. Only baroque relief dedicated to San Isidro was preserved.

The town still has several houses with keystones. The one at Cal Llombart has Renaissance style balconies while those at Cal Victor resemble a farmhouse.

Almoster celebrates its main festival on 30 July, the day of Saints Abdon and Senen. The second festival takes place on 29 September, the day of San Miguel. The first Sunday in December is the Festa de l'oli (feast of oil), with tasting of the first pressing of the excellent oil from the area of the designation of origin "Siurana".

== Economy ==
The main economic activity of the municipality is agriculture. The main crops are hazel, olive and carob trees.
