= Tossal de la Baltasana =

Coordinates: 41°19′34″N 1°00′15″E

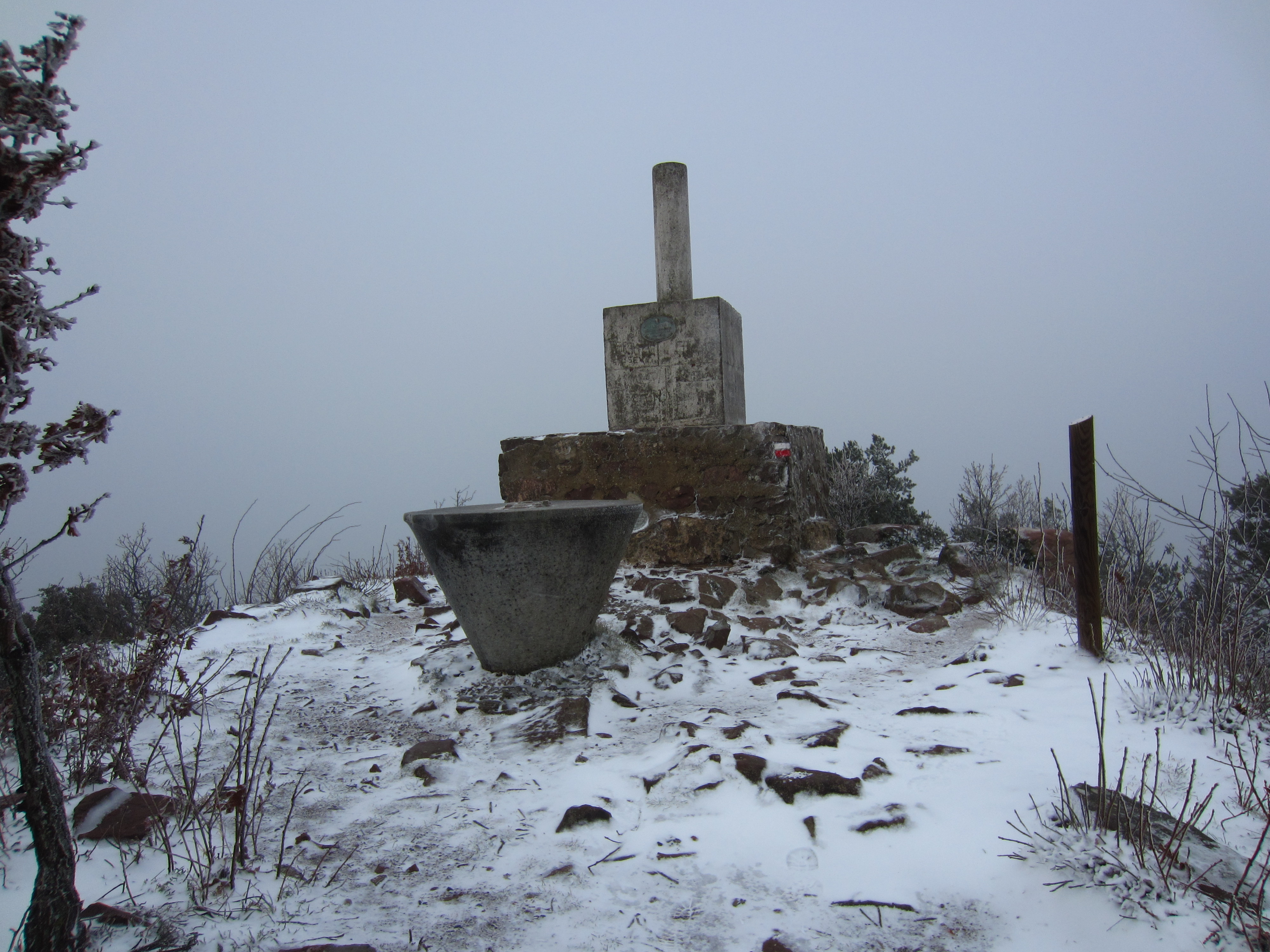
- Top of the Tossal de la Baltasana or de la Torre.

Highest point
- Elevation: 1,203 m (3,947 ft)

Geography
- Location: Catalonia, Spain
- Parent range: Prades Mountains

Tossal de la Baltasana is a mountain of Catalonia, Spain. It has an elevation of 1,203 metres above sea level.

== See also ==
- Mountains of Catalonia
