= La Selva del Camp =

- Municipality
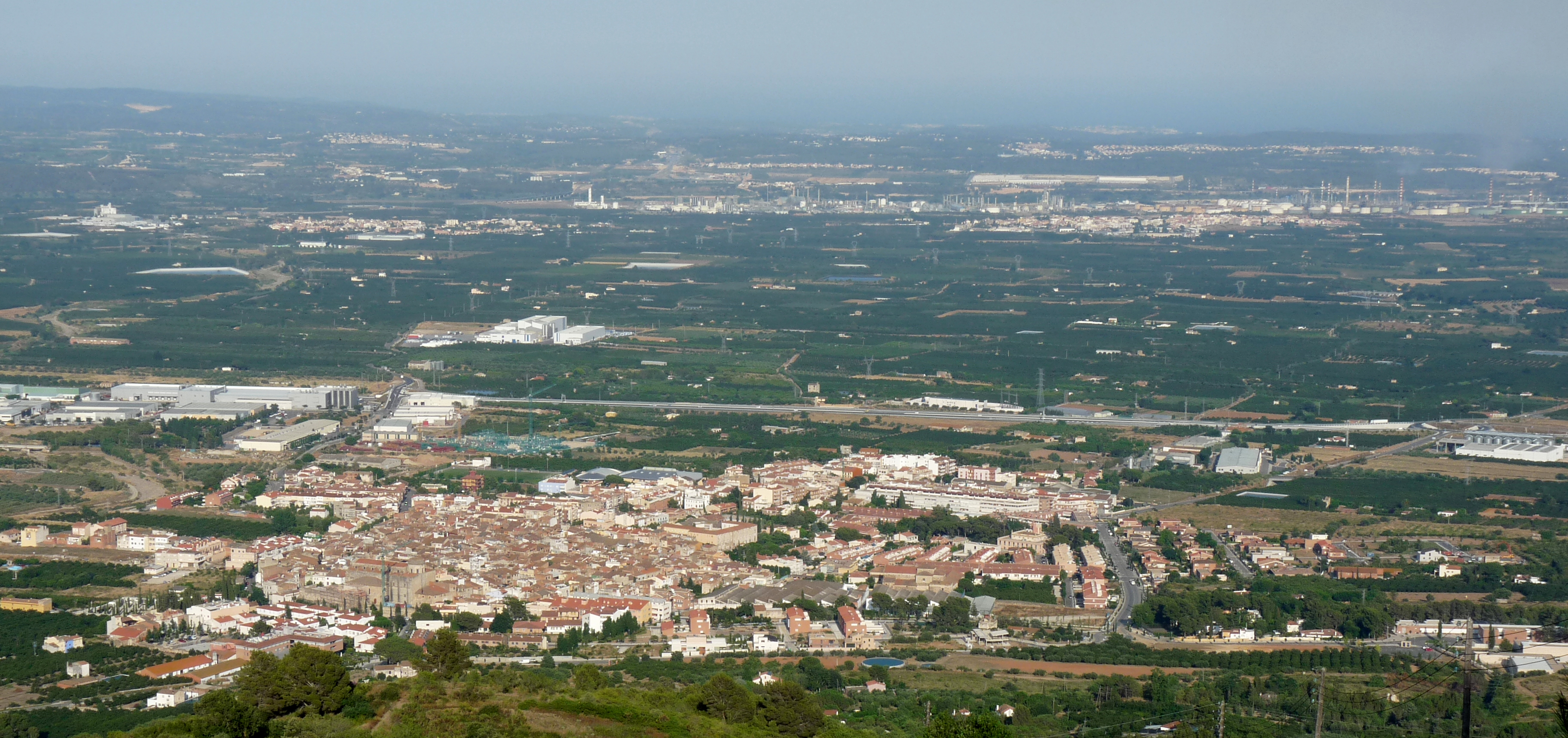

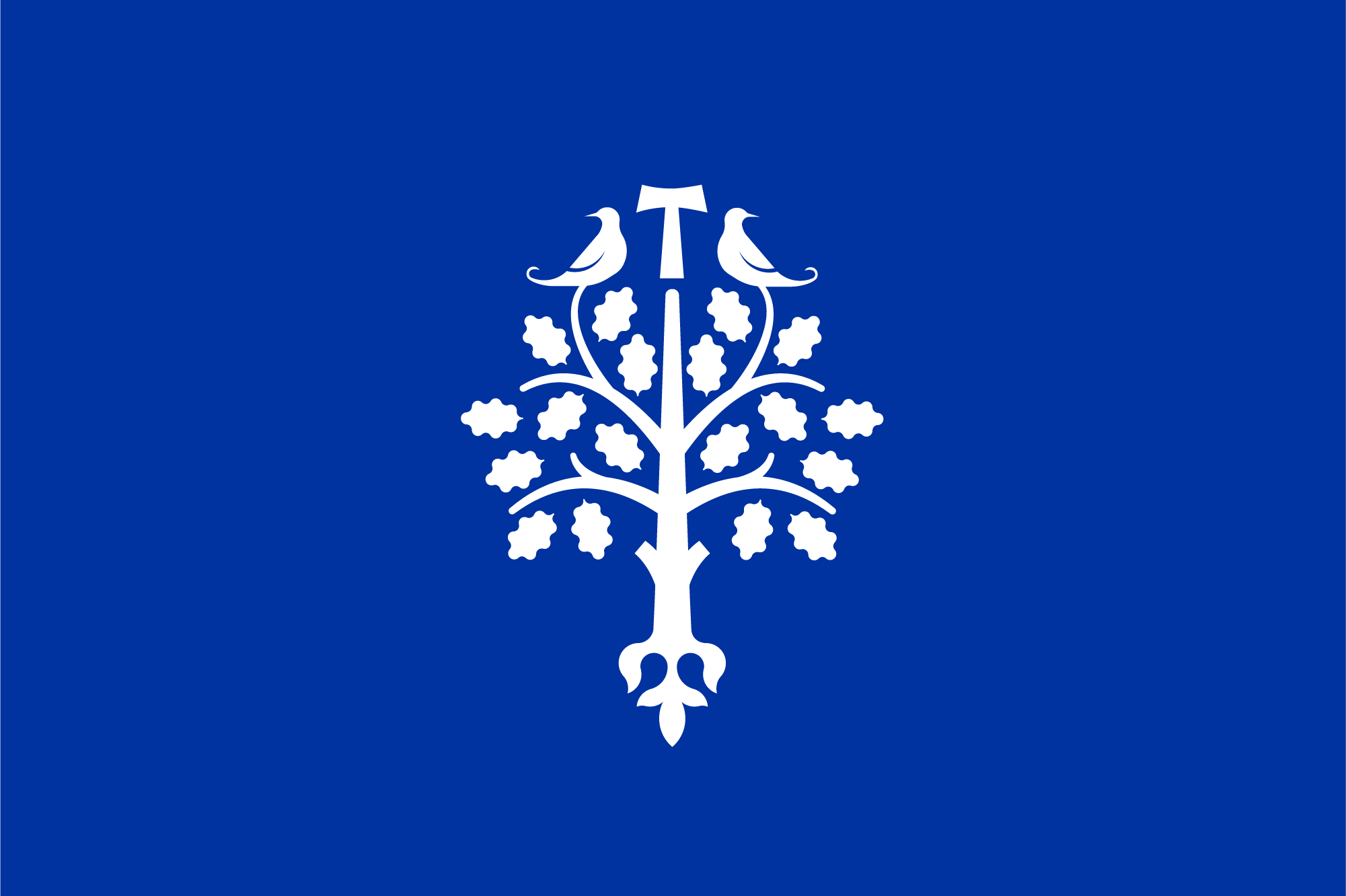
- Flag Coat of arms

- Location within Catalonia Location within Spain
- Coordinates: 41°12′53″N 1°8′23″E
- Autonomous community: Catalonia
- Province: Tarragona
- Comarca: Baix Camp

Government
  - Mayor: Jordi Vinyals Nogués (2015)

Area
  - Total: 35.3 km^{2} (13.6 sq mi)
- Elevation: 246 m (807 ft)

Population (2025-01-01)
  - Total: 5,732
  - Density: 162/km^{2} (421/sq mi)
- Time zone: UTC+1 (CET)
  - Summer (DST): UTC+2 (CEST)
- Website: www.laselvadelcamp.cat

La Selva del Camp (Catalan pronunciation: [lə ˈsɛlβə ðəl ˈkam]) is a municipality in the province of Tarragona, Catalonia, northern Spain. It has a population of 5,732 (register office, 2025).

The Prades Mountains are located in the vicinity of this municipality.

== Main sights ==
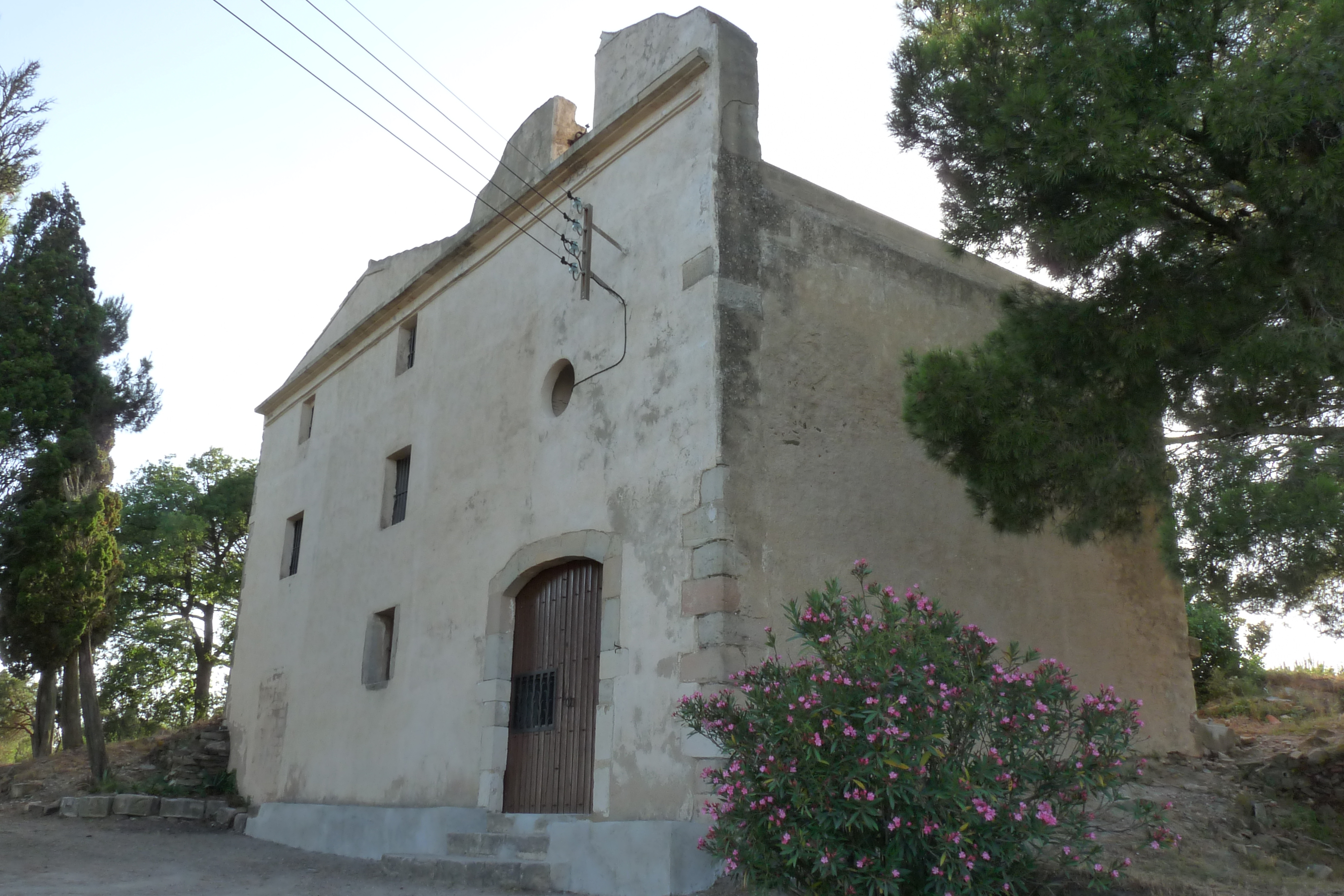
Hermitage of Sant Pere de la Selva

- Parish church of Sant Andreu
- Castle (12th century)
- Convent of St. Raphael (17th century)
- St. Antony Gate
- Pont Alt (Old Bridge, rebuilt in the 16th century)
- Church of Sant Pau (13th century)
- Hermitage of Sant Pere del Puig (12th century)
- Hermitage of Santa Maria de Paretdelgada
- Chapel of St. Nicholas

== Notable people ==
- Ventura Gassol (1893-1980), writer and politician
