= Arbolí =

- Municipality
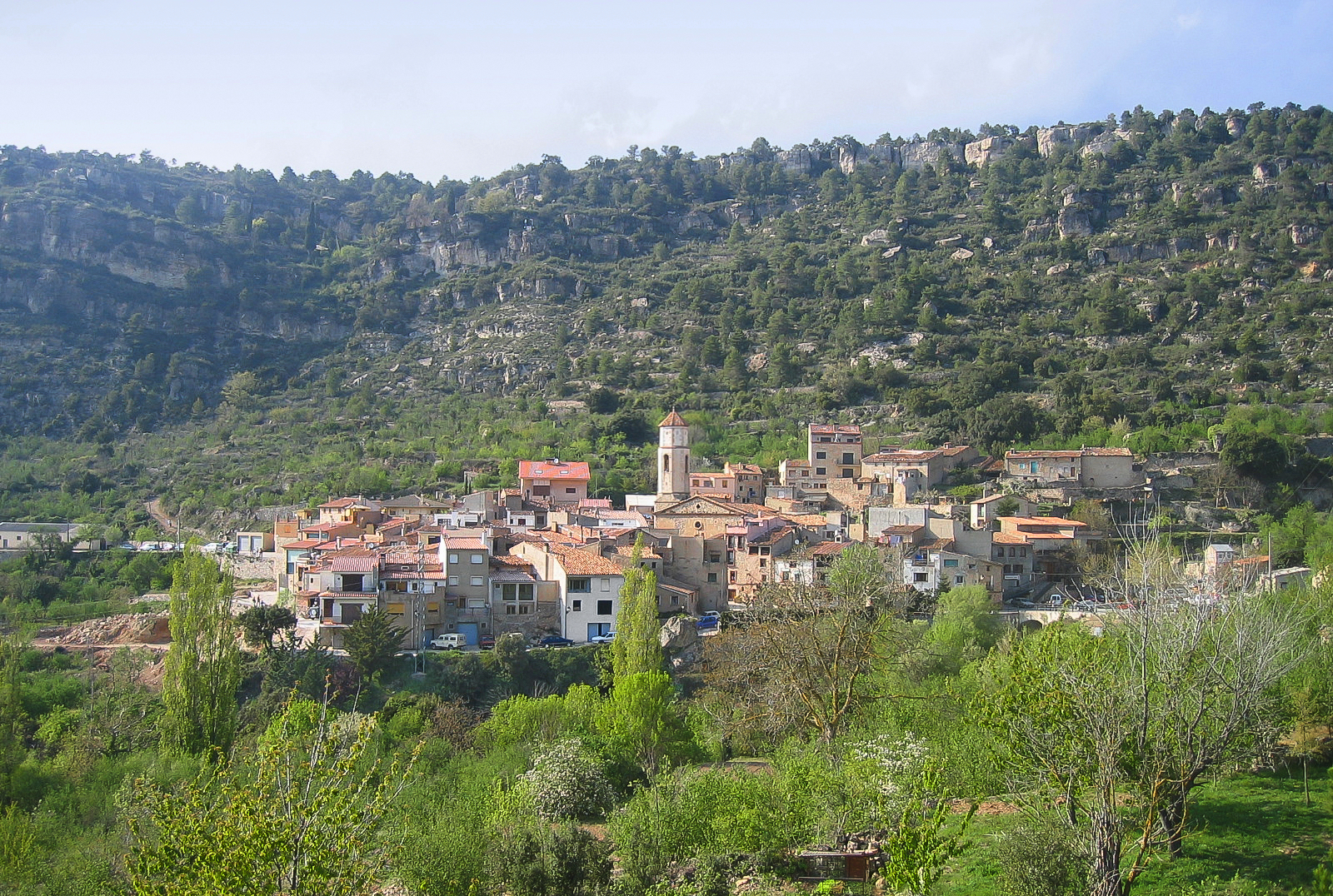

- Location in Catalonia
- Coordinates: 41.243°N 0.949°E
- Country: Spain
- Community: Catalonia
- Province: Tarragona
- Comarca: Baix Camp

Government
  - Mayor: Elisenda Barceló Olivé (2015)

Area
  - Total: 20.8 km^{2} (8.0 sq mi)
- Elevation: 714 m (2,343 ft)

Population (2025-01-01)
  - Total: 138
  - Density: 6.63/km^{2} (17.2/sq mi)
- Demonyms: Arbolinenc, arbolinenca
- Website: www.arboli.altanet.org

Arbolí (Catalan pronunciation: [əɾβuˈli]) is a municipality in the comarca of the Baix Camp in Catalonia, Spain. It is situated in the west of the comarca in the Prades mountains. A local road links the village with the C-242 road.

The Prades Mountains are located in the vicinity of this municipality.

== Demography ==
It has a population of 138 (register office, 2025).

1900	1930	1950	1970	1986	2016
515	286	169	164	130	125

== Note ==
1. Arbolí became part of the Baix Camp in the comarcal revision of 1990: previously it formed part of the Priorat.
