= Punta de la Barrina =

Coordinates: 41°16′39″N 1°04′03″E

Highest point
- Elevation: 1,013 m (3,323 ft)

Geography
- Location: Catalonia, Spain
- Parent range: Prades Mountains,

Punta de la Barrina is a mountain located in Catalonia, Spain. It has an elevation of 1,013 metres above sea level.

== See also ==
- Mountains of Catalonia
