= L'Aleixar =

- Municipality
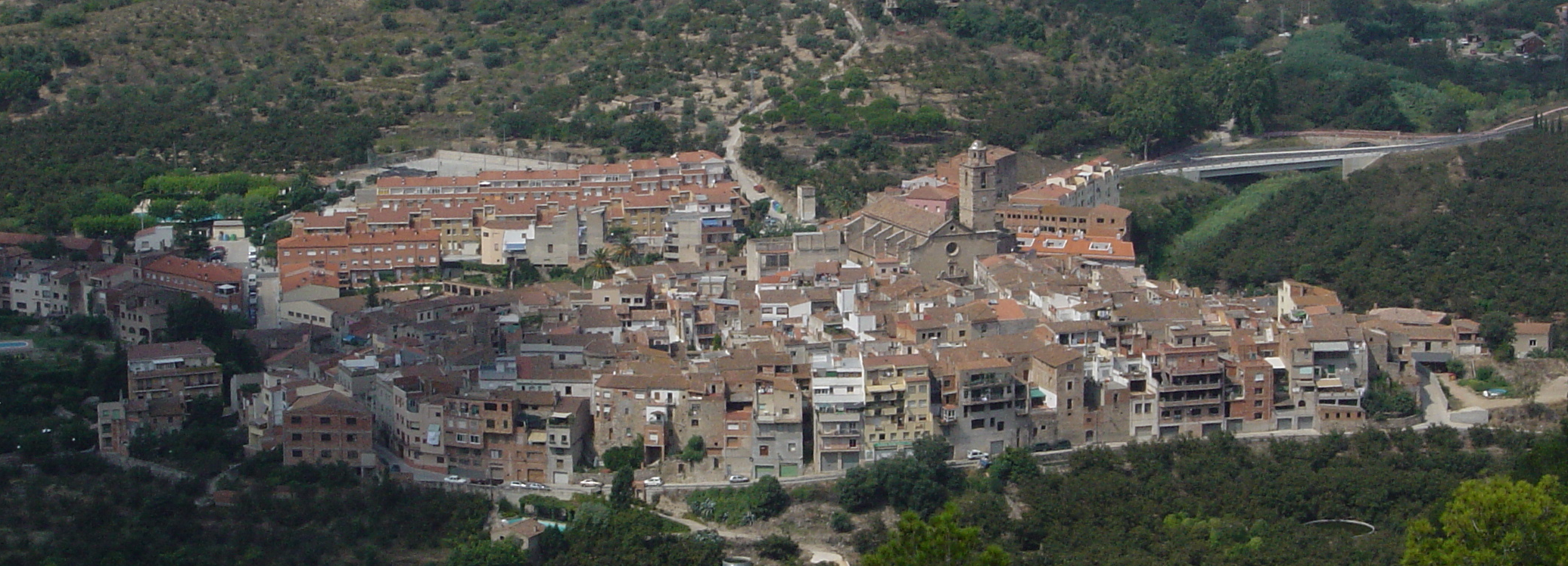
- View of L'Aleixar

- Coat of arms

- Location in Spain L'Aleixar (Spain)
- Coordinates: 41°12′11″N 1°2′51″E
- Country: Spain
- Autonomous community: Catalonia
- Province: Tarragona
- Comarca: Baix Camp

Government
  - mayor: Antoni Abelló Grau (2015)

Area
  - Total: 26.1 km^{2} (10.1 sq mi)
- Elevation: 262 m (860 ft)

Population (2025-01-01)
  - Total: 1,009
  - Density: 38.7/km^{2} (100/sq mi)
- Demonyms: Aleixarenc, aleixarenca
- Postal code: 43381
- Website: www.aleixar.altanet.org

L'Aleixar (Catalan pronunciation: [lələjˈʃa]) is a municipality in the comarca of Baix Camp, in the province of Tarragona, Catalonia, Spain. It has a population of 1,009 (register office, 2025).

The Serra de la Mussara, a subrange of the Prades Mountains rises north of the town. The church is dedicated to Saint Martin.

== See also ==
- Prades Mountains
