= Riudecols =

- Municipality
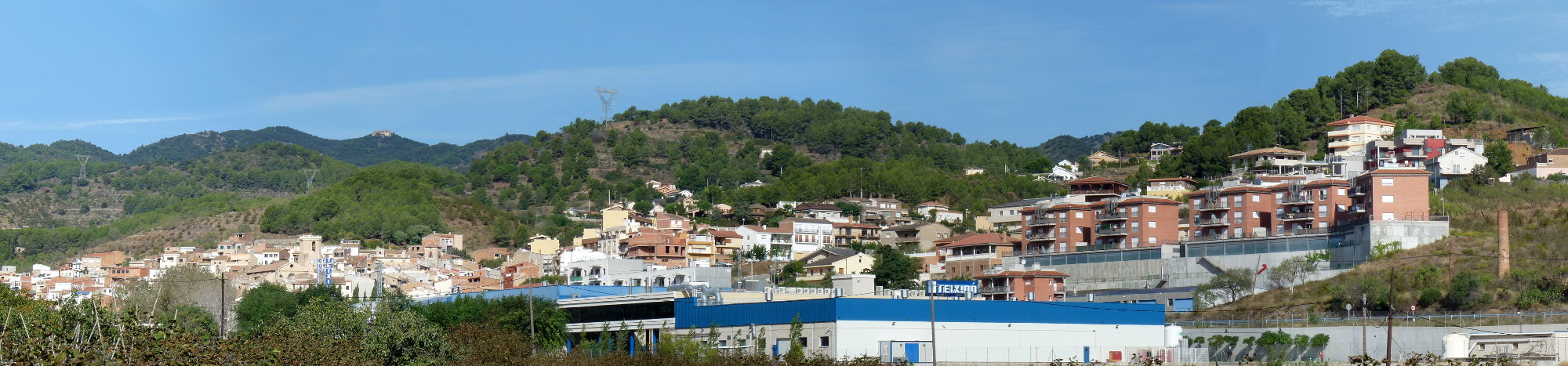
- Riudecols

- Flag Coat of arms

- Location in Catalonia
- Coordinates: 41°10′N 0°59′E
- Country: Spain
- Community: Catalonia
- Province: Tarragona
- Comarca: Baix Camp

Government
  - Mayor: Anna Isabel Aragonés Roc (2015)

Area
  - Total: 19.5 km^{2} (7.5 sq mi)

Population (2025-01-01)
  - Total: 1,264
  - Density: 64.8/km^{2} (168/sq mi)
- Website: www.riudecols.cat

Riudecols (Catalan pronunciation: [ˌriwðəˈkɔls]) is a village in the province of Tarragona and autonomous community of Catalonia, Spain. It has a population of 1,264 (register office, 2025).
