= La Mussara (Vilaplana) =

Mountain in Catalonia, Spain

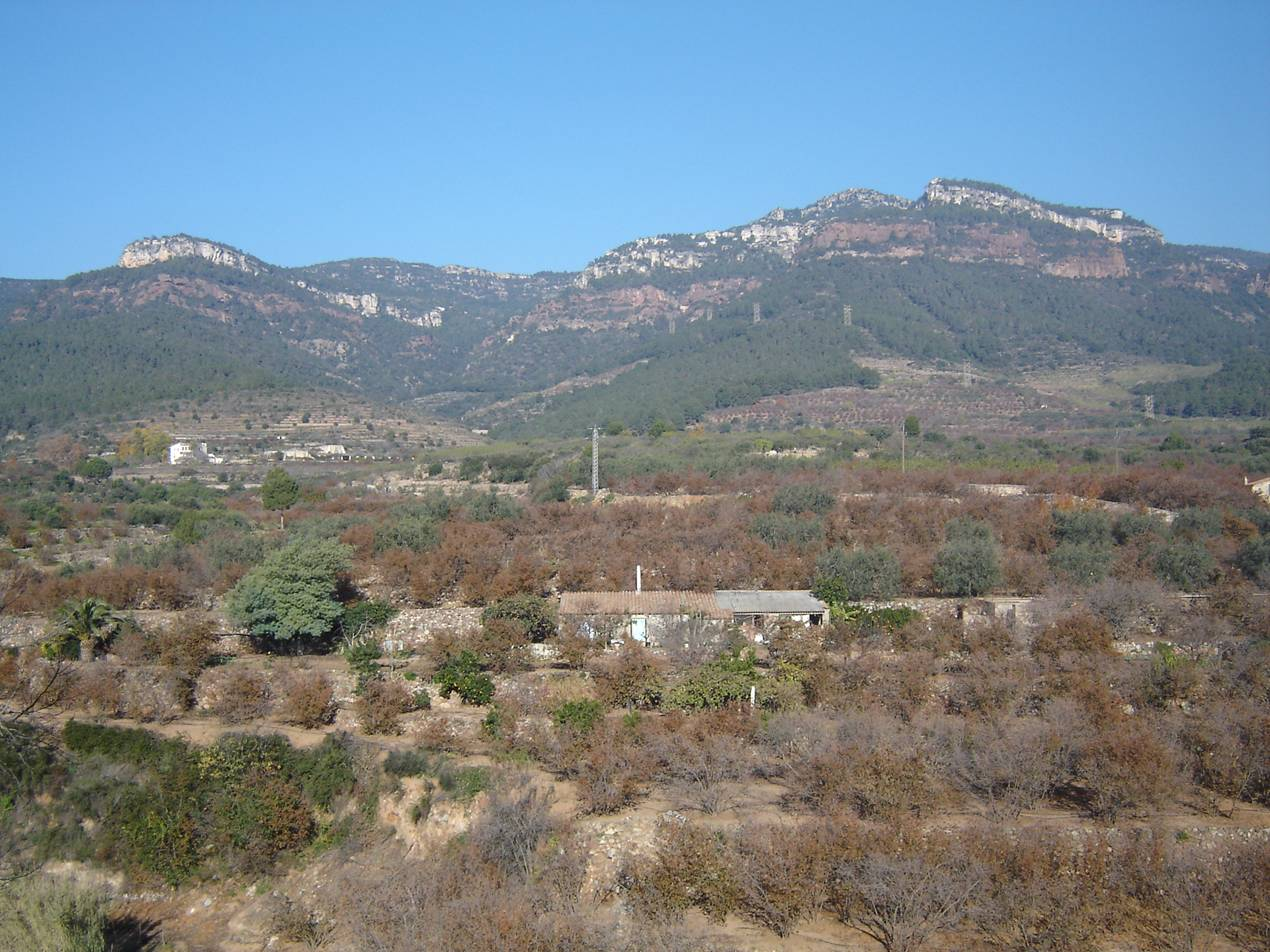
- View of Serra de la Mussara, with La Mussara on the right

Highest point
- Elevation: 1,055.6 m (3,463 ft)
- Coordinates: 41°15′28.73″N 1°3′20.80″E

Geography
- Location: Baix Camp, Catalonia
- Parent range: Serra de la Mussara (Prades Mountains)

Geology
- Mountain type: Limestone

Climbing
- First ascent: Unknown
- Easiest route: From Vilaplana

La Mussara is a mountain of Catalonia, Spain. It is the highest peak of the Serra de la Mussara, a subrange of the Prades Mountains. Located north of the town of Vilaplana, La Mussara has an elevation of 1055 metres above sea level.

This mountain is named after the abandoned village of La Mussara, located in the range. There is a triangulation station at the summit (ref. 262132001).

== See also ==
- Prades Mountains
- Mountains of Catalonia
