= Vilanova d'Escornalbou =

- Municipality
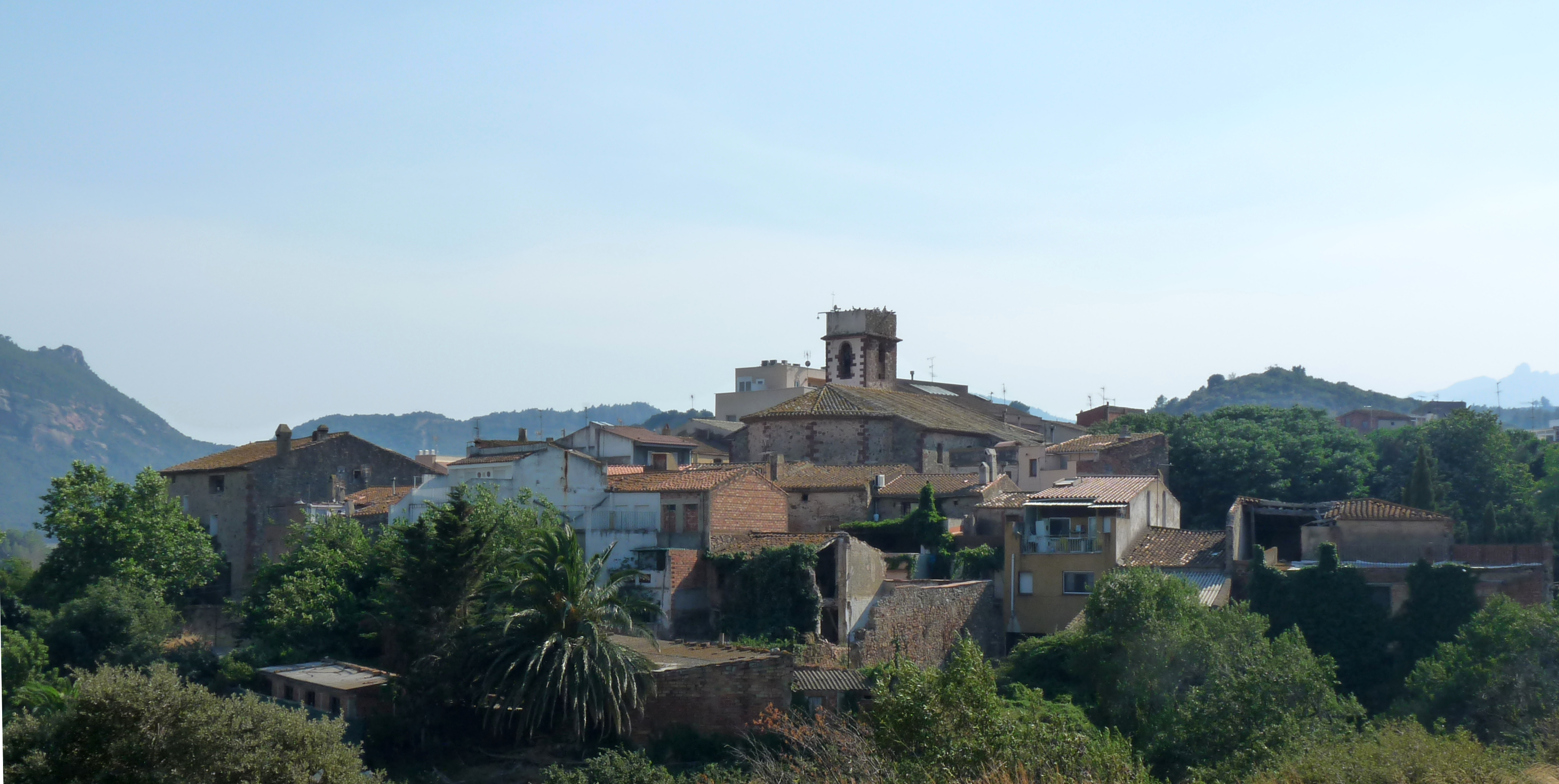
- Vilanova d'Escornalbou

- Flag Coat of arms

- Location in Catalonia
- Coordinates: 41°6′47″N 0°56′15″E
- Country: Spain
- Community: Catalonia
- Province: Tarragona
- Comarca: Baix Camp

Government
  - Mayor: Sergi Ciurana Nicolau (2015)

Area
  - Total: 17.2 km^{2} (6.6 sq mi)

Population (2025-01-01)
  - Total: 614
  - Density: 35.7/km^{2} (92.5/sq mi)
- Website: vescornalbou.cat

Vilanova d'Escornalbou (Catalan pronunciation: [ˌbiləˈnɔβə ðəsˌkoɾnəlˈβɔw]) is a village in the province of Tarragona and autonomous community of Catalonia, Spain. It has a population of 614 (register office, 2025).
