= Les Borges del Camp =

- Municipality
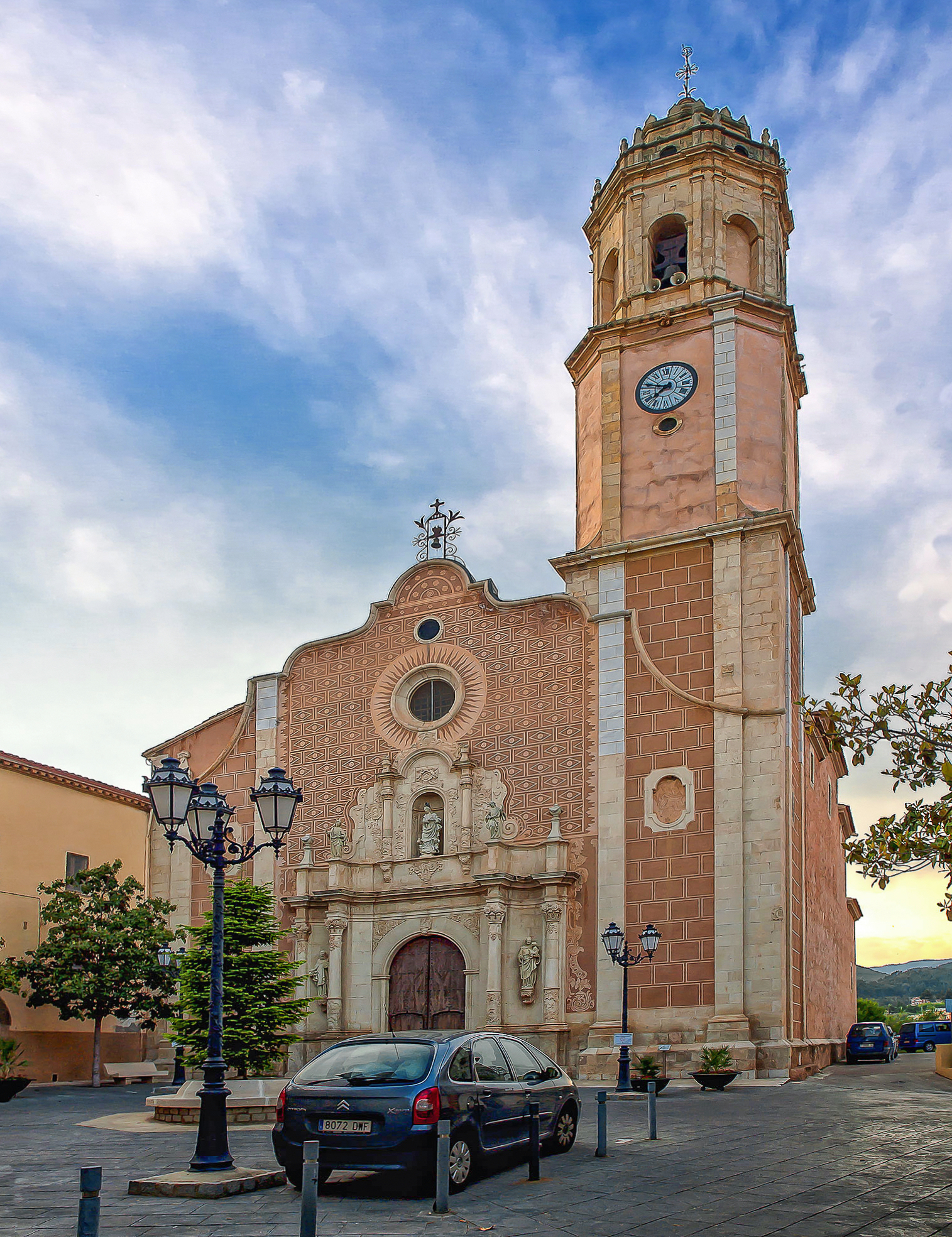
- Church of the Assumption

- Flag Coat of arms

- Location in Catalonia
- Coordinates: 41°10′N 1°1′E
- Country: Spain
- Community: Catalonia
- Province: Tarragona
- Comarca: Baix Camp

Government
  - Mayor: Joaquim Calatayud Casals (2015)

Area
  - Total: 8.2 km^{2} (3.2 sq mi)
- Elevation: 238 m (781 ft)

Population (2025-01-01)
  - Total: 2,319
  - Density: 280/km^{2} (730/sq mi)
- Website: lesborgesdelcamp.cat

Les Borges del Camp (Catalan pronunciation: [ləz ˈβɔɾʒəz ðəl ˈkam]) is a village in the province of Tarragona and autonomous community of Catalonia, Spain. It has a population of 2,319 (register office, 2025).
