= Alforja =

- Municipality
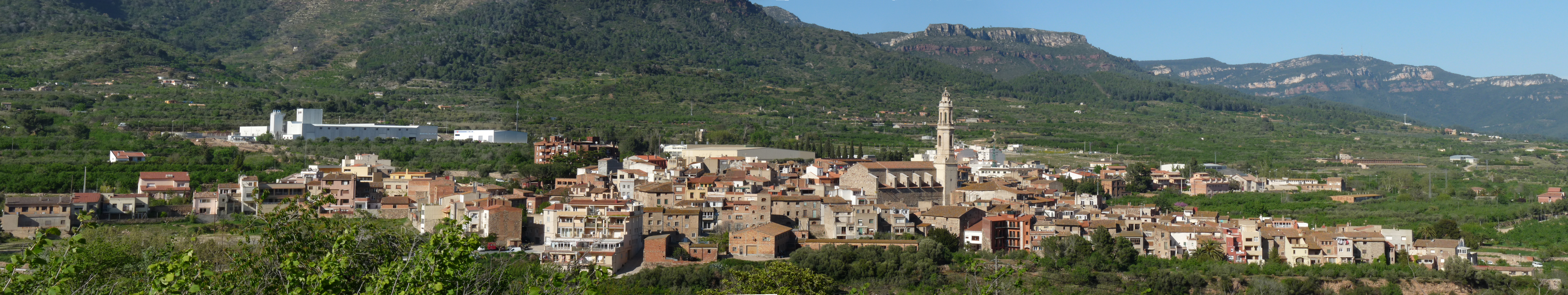
- Alforja

- Coat of arms

- Location in Spain
- Coordinates: 41.212°N 0.976°E
- Country: Spain
- Autonomous community: Catalonia
- Province: Tarragona
- Comarca: Baix Camp

Government
  - mayor: Joan Josep García Rodríguez (2015)

Area
  - Total: 38.2 km^{2} (14.7 sq mi)
- Elevation: 374 m (1,227 ft)

Population (2025-01-01)
  - Total: 2,024
  - Density: 53.0/km^{2} (137/sq mi)
- Demonyms: Alforgenc, alforgenca
- Postal code: 43382
- Website: alforja.cat

Alforja (Catalan pronunciation: [əlˈfɔɾʒə]) is a municipality in the comarca of Baix Camp, in the province of Tarragona, Catalonia, Spain. It has a population of 2,024 (register office, 2025).

The main monuments are Sant Miquel church in the town, as well as the shrines of Sant Antoni de Pàdua and Mare de Déu de Puigcerver outside its perimeter.

The Prades Mountains are located in the vicinity of this municipality.

== Villages ==
- Alforja, 1,207
- Les Barqueres, 91
- Els Garrigots, 11
- El Mas de l'Aleu, 4
- Portugal 141
- Sant Antoni 18
- Els Servians, 16
