= Botarell =

- Municipality
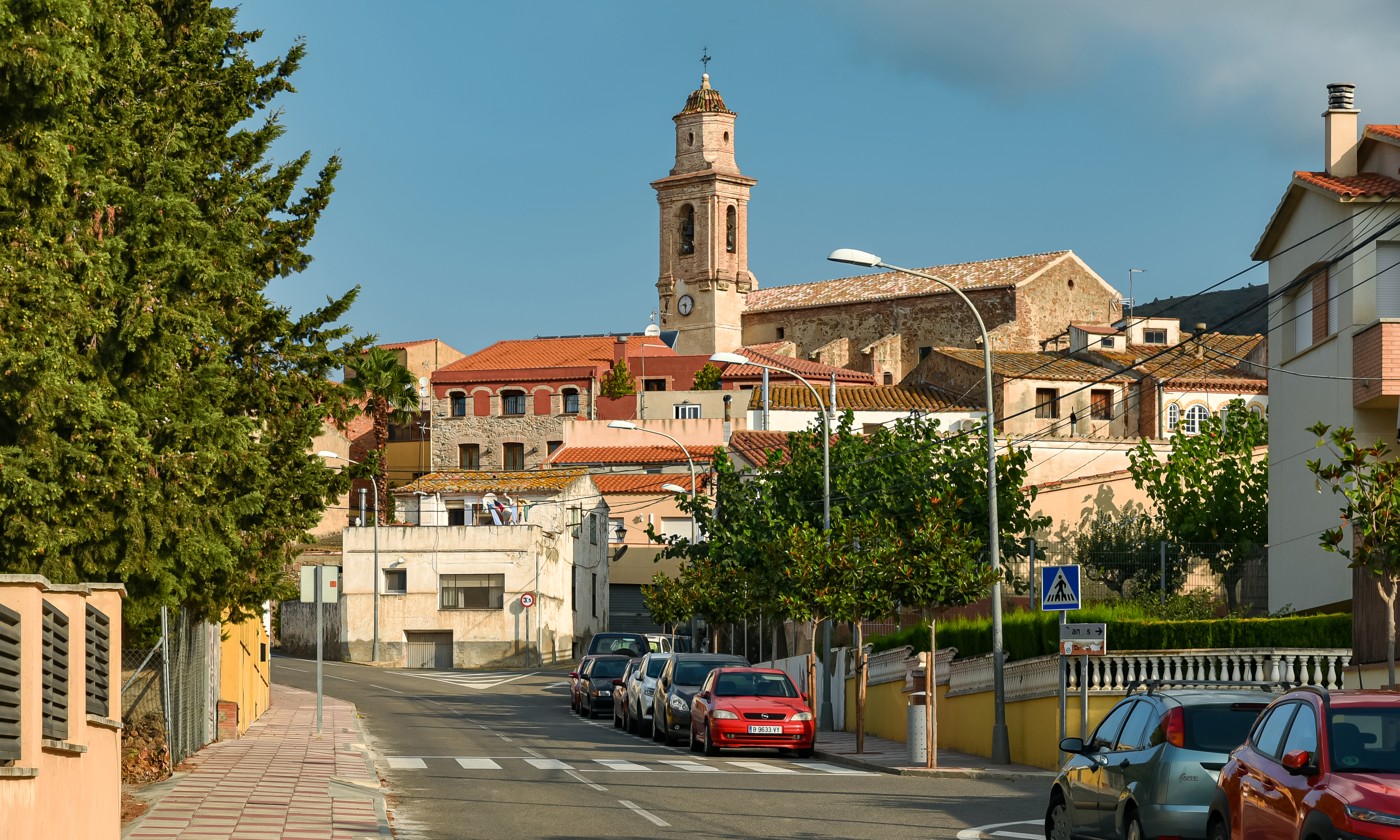

- Coat of arms

- Location in Catalonia
- Coordinates: 41°8′N 0°59′E
- Country: Spain
- Community: Catalonia
- Province: Tarragona
- Comarca: Baix Camp

Government
  - Mayor: Lluis Escoda Freixas (2015)

Area
  - Total: 12.0 km^{2} (4.6 sq mi)

Population (2025-01-01)
  - Total: 1,161
  - Density: 96.7/km^{2} (251/sq mi)
- Website: www.botarell.altanet.org

Botarell (Catalan pronunciation: [butəˈɾeʎ]) is a village in the province of Tarragona and autonomous community of Catalonia, Spain. It has a population of 1,161 (register office, 2025).
