= Montbrió del Camp =

- Municipality
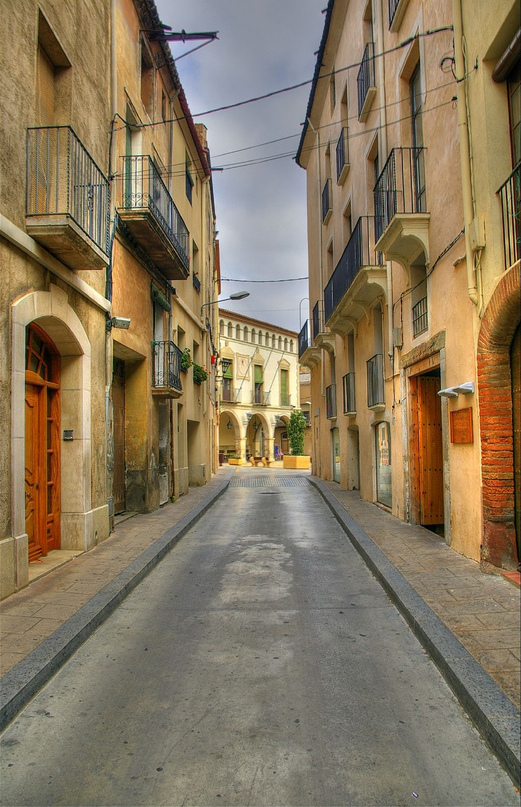

- Coat of arms

- Location in Catalonia
- Coordinates: 41°7′14″N 1°0′11″E
- Country: Spain
- Community: Catalonia
- Province: Tarragona
- Comarca: Baix Camp

Government
  - Mayor: Vicenç Ferré Puig (2015)

Area
  - Total: 10.7 km^{2} (4.1 sq mi)

Population (2025-01-01)
  - Total: 3,157
  - Density: 295/km^{2} (764/sq mi)
- Website: montbriodelcamp.cat

Montbrió del Camp (Catalan pronunciation: [mumbɾiˈo ðəl ˈkam]) is a village in the province of Tarragona and autonomous community of Catalonia, Spain.

It has a population of 3,157 (register office, 2025) and a land area of 10.7km.

== Tourism ==
Montbrio del Camp is home to many tourism spots. The most major tourism spot here is called "Hotel Termes Montbrio", which is a 4 star hotel next to the AP-7 highway. Hotel Termes is also known for having a spa called "Aquatonic", that consists of many pools. The hotel is 2km away from 14-hectare park "Parc Sama" which consists of many tropical plants, and different animals for people to see. Montbrio del Camp is also renowned for its restaurants and Chinese population, which can be seen in multiple bars, the most popular called "La Manduca".

Town hall of Montbrio Del Camp, in a village square of a bakery and a bar.

== Prominent brands ==
Montbrio Del Camp also has many brands situated there. It has two major stores, a Eurospar, and a Suma. These are situated in the centre of the village, with the main brand coming from here called "Monte Brione", which is a vinegar brand that also sells Rotisserie Chicken and fries.
