= Prades, Spain =

Prades
- Municipality
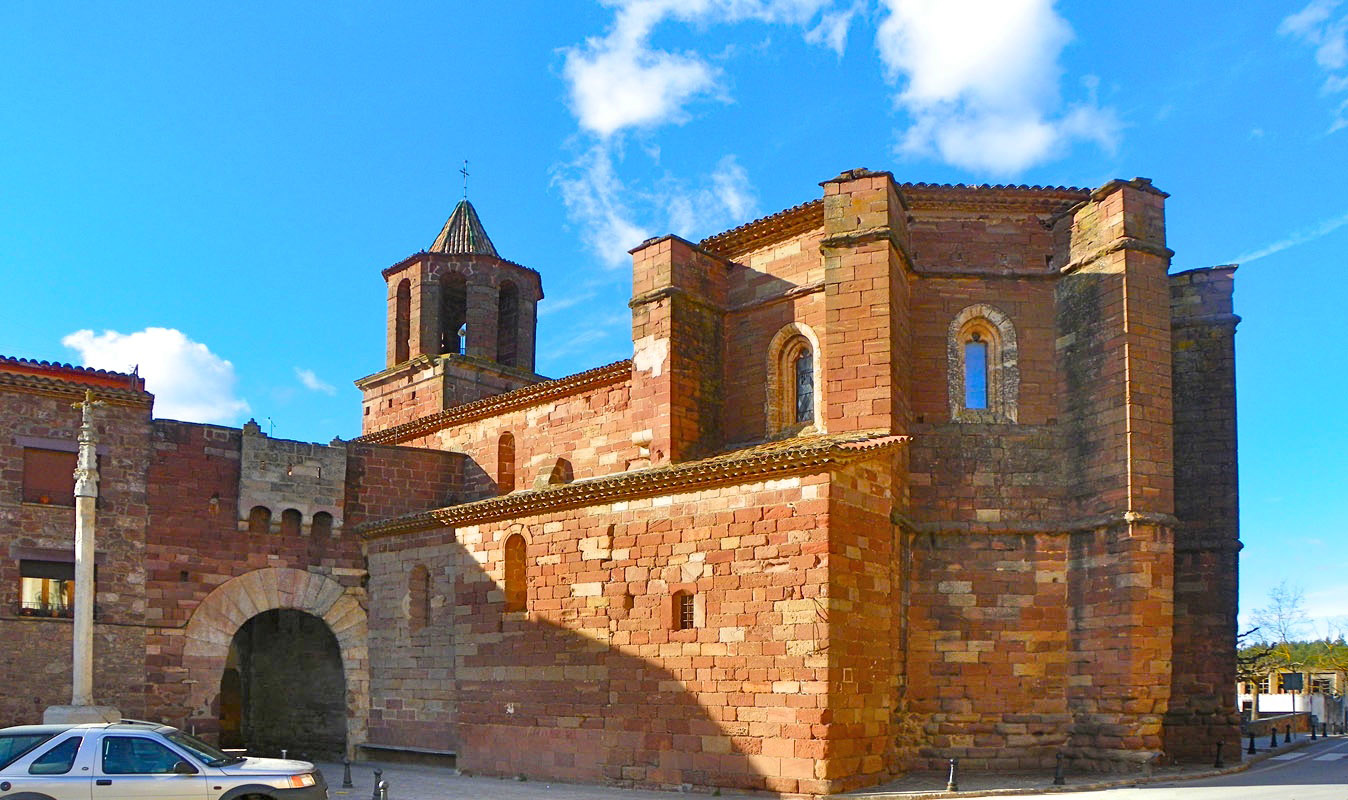
- Prades

- Flag Coat of arms

- Location in Spain Prades (Spain)
- Coordinates: 41.3105°N 0.988°E
- Country: Spain
- Autonomous community: Catalonia
- Province: Tarragona
- Comarca: Baix Camp

Government
  - Mayor: Lidia Bargas Musoy (2015)

Area
  - Total: 32.6 km^{2} (12.6 sq mi)
- Elevation: 940 m (3,080 ft)

Population (2025-01-01)
  - Total: 629
  - Density: 19.3/km^{2} (50.0/sq mi)
- Demonym(s): Pradenc, pradenca
- Postal code: 43364
- Website: prades.cat

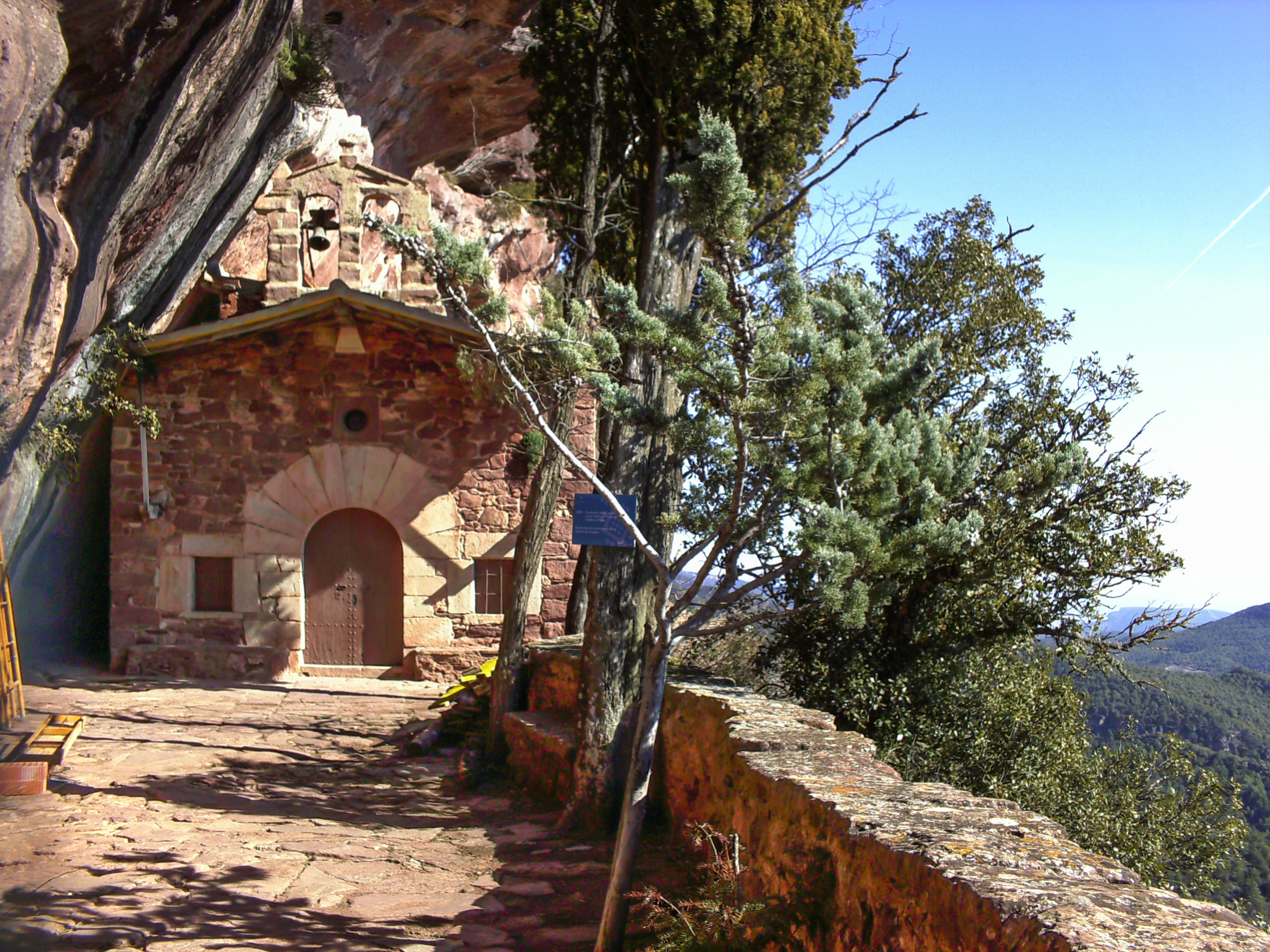
Ermita de l'Abellera, Prades

Prades (Catalan pronunciation: [ˈpɾaðəs]) is a municipality in the comarca of Baix Camp, in the province of Tarragona, Catalonia, Spain.

It has a population of 629 (register office, 2025).

The main monuments are Santa Maria church in the town, as well as the Ermita de l'Abellera shrine located in an escarpment, outside the town's perimeter.

This town gives its name to the Prades Mountains, located in the vicinity of the municipality. It is a high altitude town, very cold in the winter, but popular as a tourist spot in the summer.

== History ==
Count Ramon Berenguer IV made the concession of a municipal charter to the place in 1159. The last saracens were expelled from the area. By 1200 Prades had already its own market and the town grew in importance and power.

The County of Prades included the Barony of Entença, as well as other towns in the area. Its total surface was 1,157 km² and its dominions extended across the present-day Baix Camp, Priorat and Alt Camp comarcas.

== See also ==
- Prades Mountains
