= Maspujols =

- Municipality
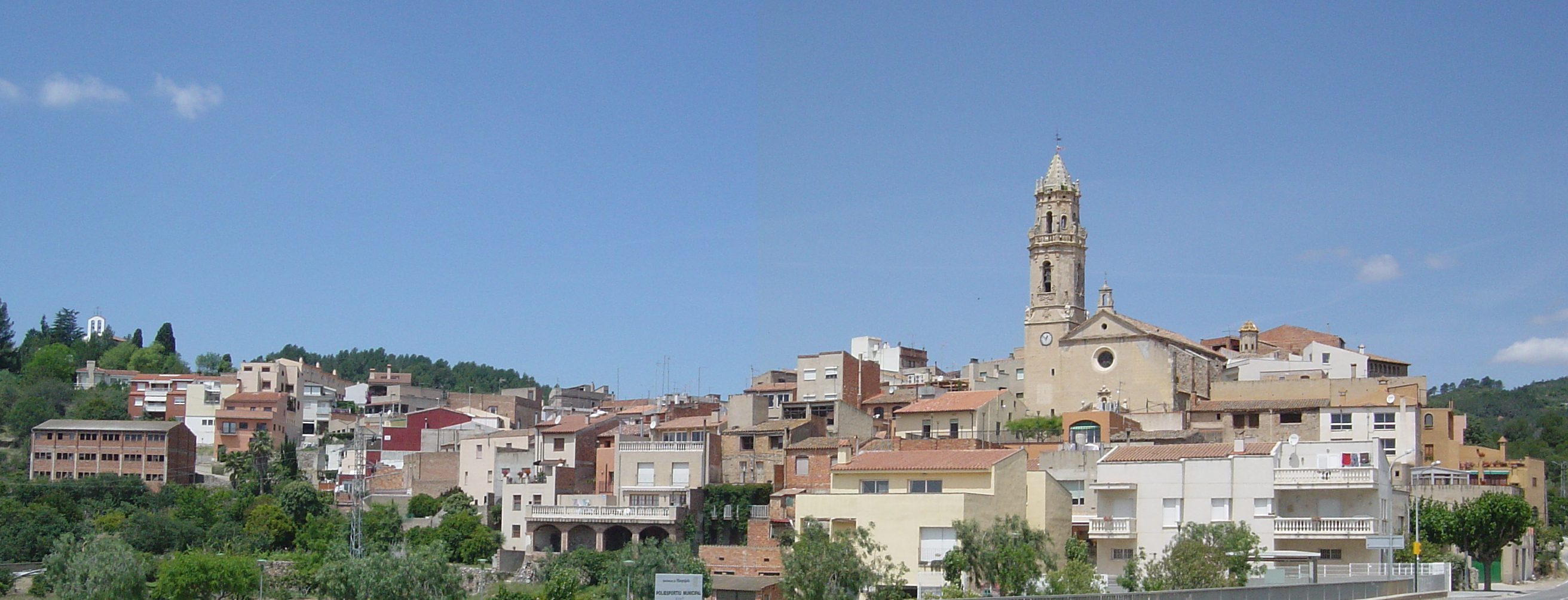
- A general view of the town center, with Santa Maria de Maspujols Church

- Coat of arms

- Location in Spain Maspujols (Spain)
- Coordinates: 41°11′3″N 1°2′51″E
- Country: Spain
- Autonomous community: Catalonia
- Province: Tarragona
- Comarca: Baix Camp

Government
  - mayor: Josep Rabascall Domingo (2015)

Area
  - Total: 3.7 km^{2} (1.4 sq mi)
- Elevation: 214 m (702 ft)

Population (2025-01-01)
  - Total: 915
  - Density: 250/km^{2} (640/sq mi)
- Demonym(s): Maspujolenc, maspujolenca
- Postal code: 43382
- Website: www.maspujols.altanet.org

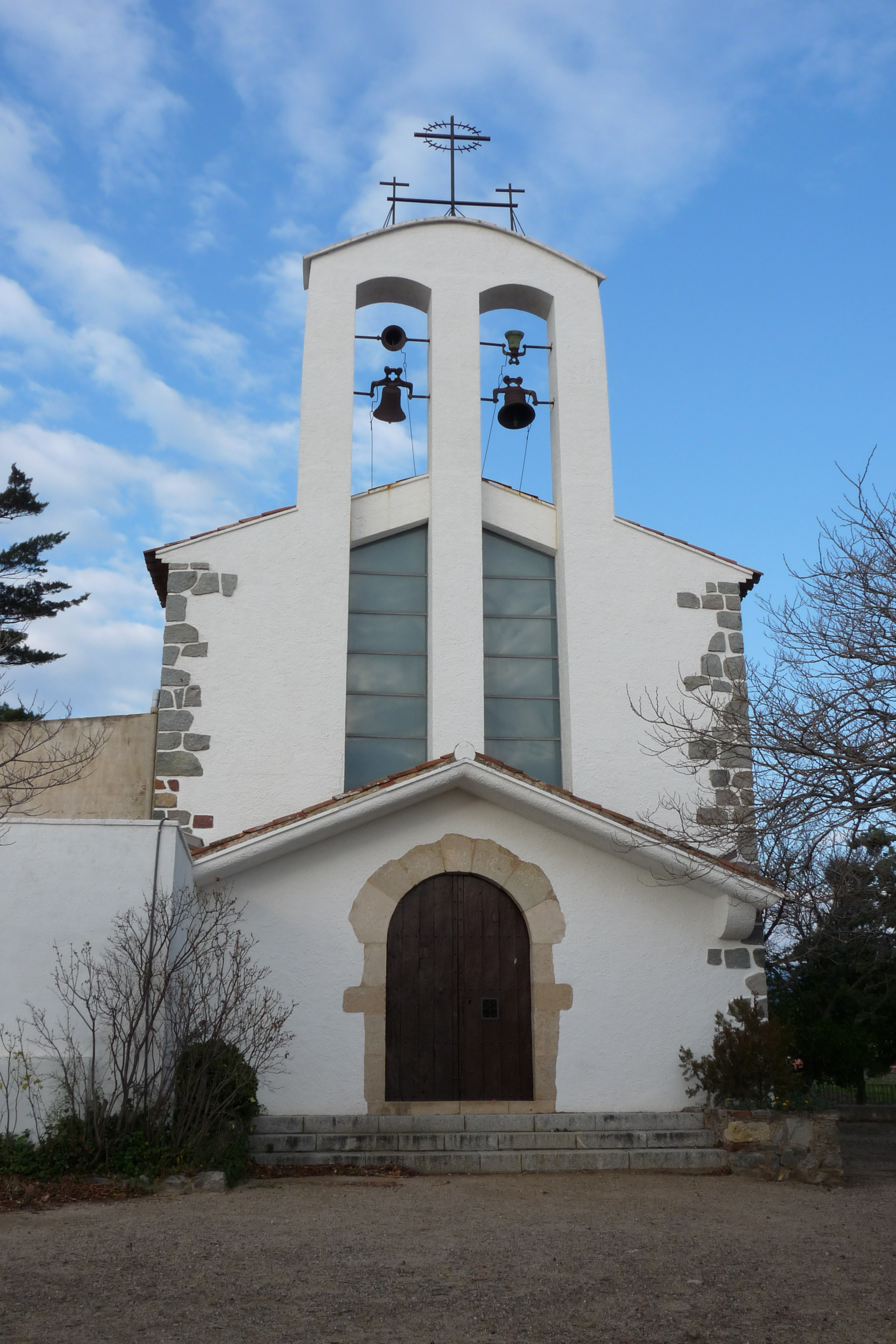
Saint Anthony church

Maspujols (Catalan pronunciation: [ˌmaspujˈʒɔls]) is a municipality in the comarca of Baix Camp, in the province of Tarragona, Catalonia, Spain. It has a population of 915 (register office, 2025).

This town is first mentioned in medieval documents in the year 1172 under King Alfons II of Aragon.

== Villages ==
- Maspujols, 516
- Rocabruna, 26
