= Vinyols i els Arcs =

- Municipality
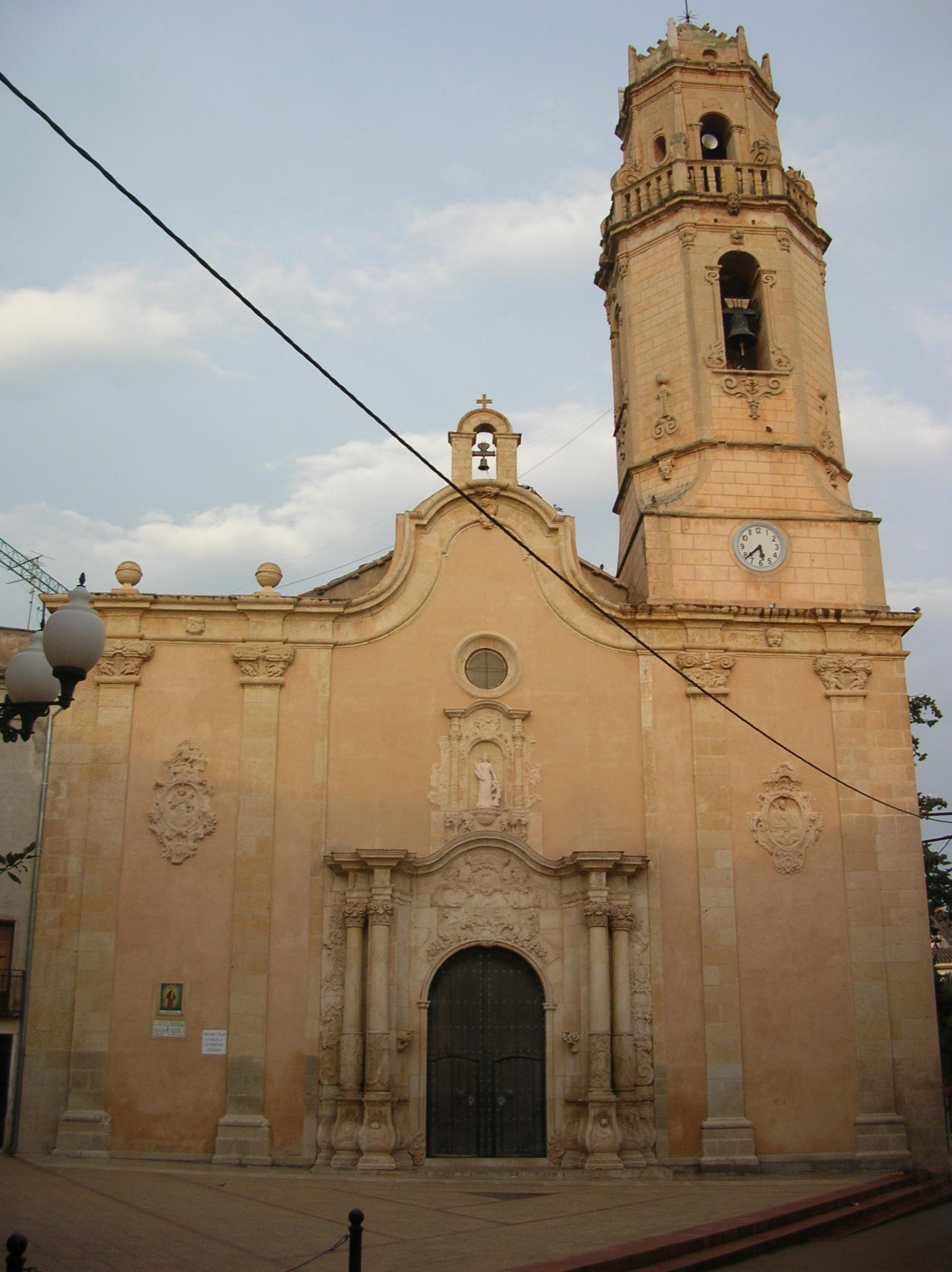
- Parish church

- Flag Coat of arms

- Location in Catalonia
- Coordinates: 41°6′58″N 1°2′24″E
- Country: Spain
- Community: Catalonia
- Province: Tarragona
- Comarca: Baix Camp

Government
  - Mayor: Arnau Guasch Girona (2015)

Area
  - Total: 10.8 km^{2} (4.2 sq mi)

Population (2025-01-01)
  - Total: 2,450
  - Density: 227/km^{2} (588/sq mi)
- Website: www.vinyols.altanet.org

Vinyols i els Arcs (Catalan pronunciation: [viˈɲɔlz jəlz ˈaɾks]) is a village in the province of Tarragona and autonomous community of Catalonia, Spain. It has a population of 2,450 (register office, 2025).
