= Duesaigües =

- Municipality
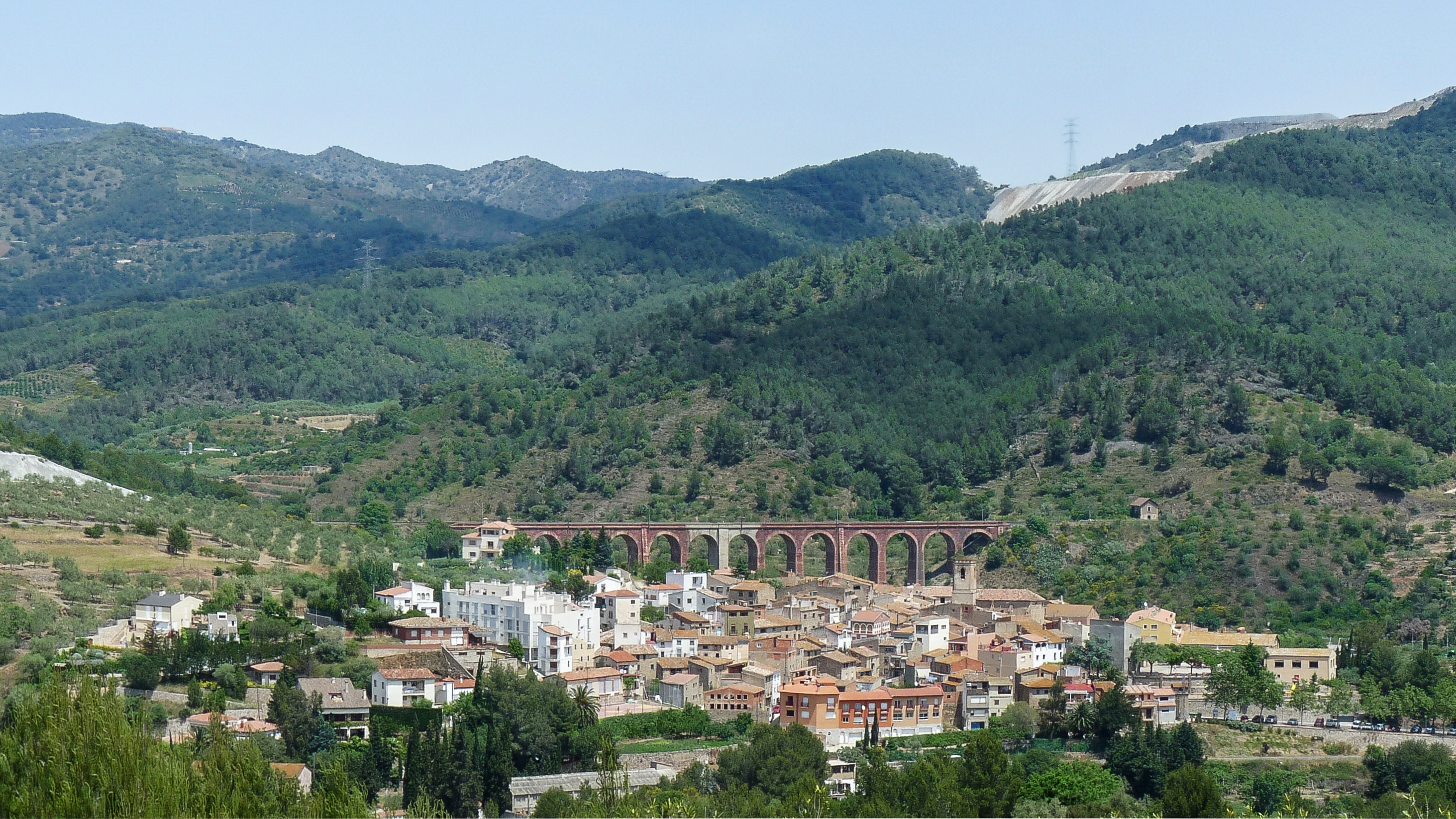

- Coat of arms

- Location in Catalonia
- Coordinates: 41°8′51″N 0°55′53″E
- Country: Spain
- Community: Catalonia
- Province: Tarragona
- Comarca: Baix Camp

Government
  - Mayor: Jose Llebaria Nolla (2015)

Area
  - Total: 13.6 km^{2} (5.3 sq mi)

Population (2025-01-01)
  - Total: 217
  - Density: 16.0/km^{2} (41.3/sq mi)
- Website: duesaigues.cat

Duesaigües (Catalan pronunciation: [ˌduəzˈajɣwəs]) is a village in the province of Tarragona and autonomous community of Catalonia, Spain. It has a population of 217 (register office, 2025).
