= La Febró =

- Municipality
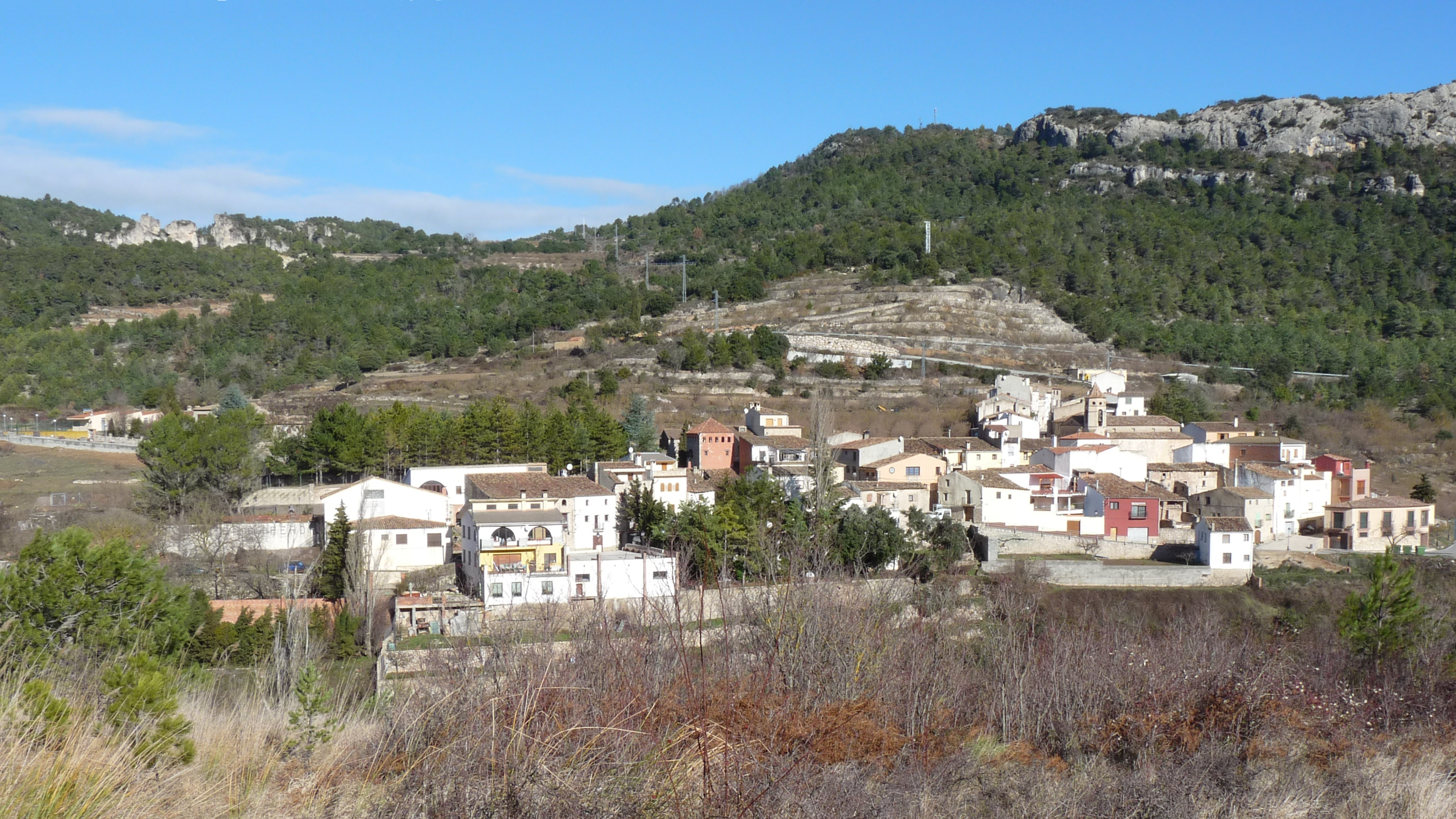
- La Febró

- Flag Coat of arms

- Location in Catalonia
- Coordinates: 41°16′46″N 1°0′20″E
- Country: Spain
- Community: Catalonia
- Province: Tarragona
- Comarca: Baix Camp

Government
  - Mayor: Lourdes Martorell i Bonet

Area
  - Total: 16.1 km^{2} (6.2 sq mi)

Population (2025-01-01)
  - Total: 35
  - Density: 2.2/km^{2} (5.6/sq mi)
- Website: www.lafebro.oasi.org

La Febró (Catalan pronunciation: [lə fəˈβɾo]) is a village in the province of Tarragona and autonomous community of Catalonia, Spain. It has a population of 35 (register office, 2025).
