= Capafonts =

- Municipality
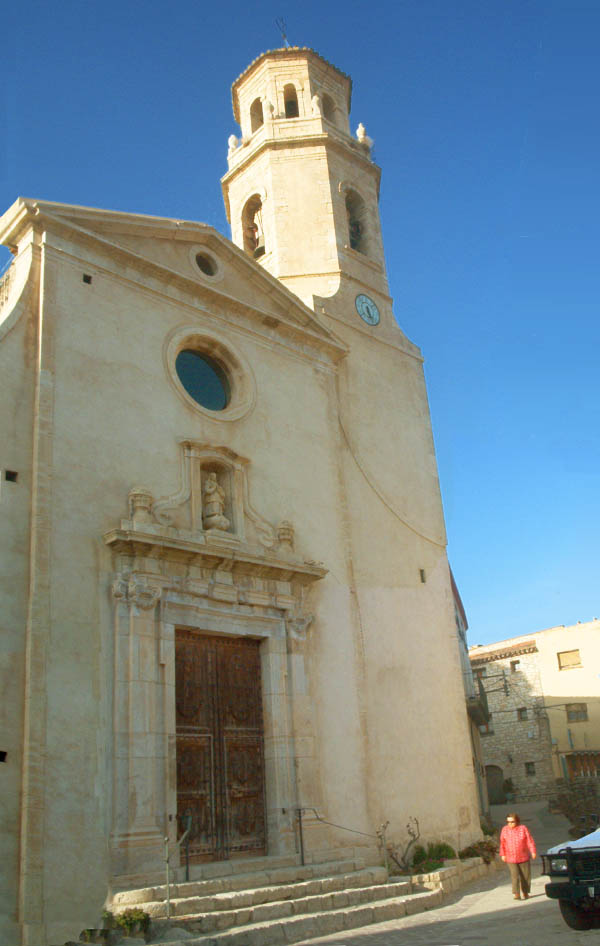
- Church

- Location in Catalonia
- Coordinates: 41°17′51″N 1°1′42″E
- Country: Spain
- Community: Catalonia
- Province: Tarragona
- Comarca: Baix Camp

Government
  - Mayor: Antoni Marca Ferrús (2015)

Area
  - Total: 13.4 km^{2} (5.2 sq mi)

Population (2025-01-01)
  - Total: 101
  - Density: 7.54/km^{2} (19.5/sq mi)
- Website: www.capafonts.cat

Capafonts (Catalan pronunciation: [ˌkapəˈfɔns]) is a village in the province of Tarragona and autonomous community of Catalonia. According to data of 2012 its population was 121 inhabitants.

Also called Capafons, with traditional spelling, the place name derives from the Latin Capite fontium, "head of the fountains". A total of 53 fountains were recorded, most notably Font de la Llódriga, which never dried.
