= L'Albiol =

- Municipality
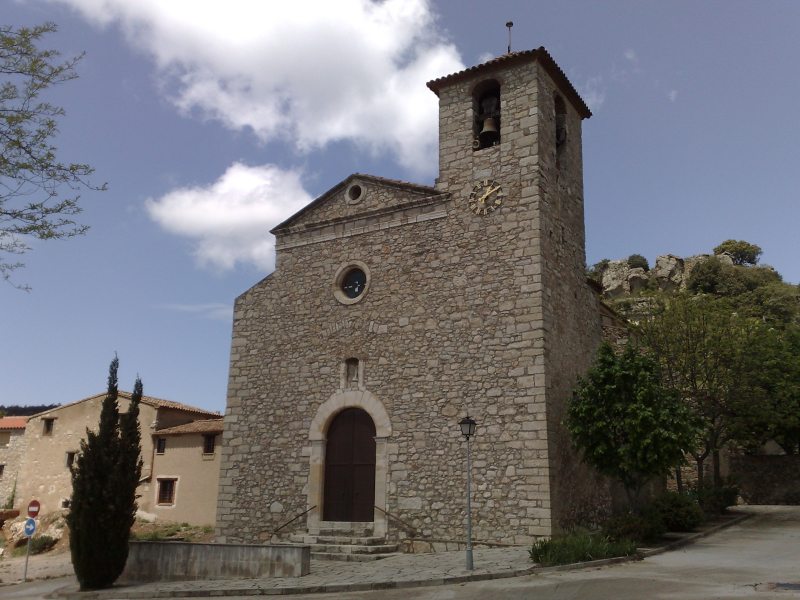
- St. Michael's parish church, L'Albiol

- Flag Coat of arms

- Location in Spain L'Albiol (Spain)
- Coordinates: 41°15′13″N 1°5′27″E
- Country: Spain
- Autonomous community: Catalonia
- Province: Tarragona
- Comarca: Baix Camp

Government
  - mayor: Lidia Guerrero Martín (2015)

Area
  - Total: 20.3 km^{2} (7.8 sq mi)
- Elevation: 823 m (2,700 ft)

Population (2025-01-01)
  - Total: 557
  - Density: 27.4/km^{2} (71.1/sq mi)
- Demonyms: Albiolenc, albiolenca
- Postal code: 43479
- Website: www.albiol.cat

L'Albiol (Catalan pronunciation: [ləlβiˈɔl]) is a municipality in the comarca of Baix Camp, in the province of Tarragona, Catalonia, Spain.

It has a population of 557 (register office, 2025).

Within the town's municipal boundaries lie a part of the Prades Mountains. The 1791 church is dedicated to Saint Michael.

== See also ==
- Prades Mountains
