= Vilaplana =

- Municipality
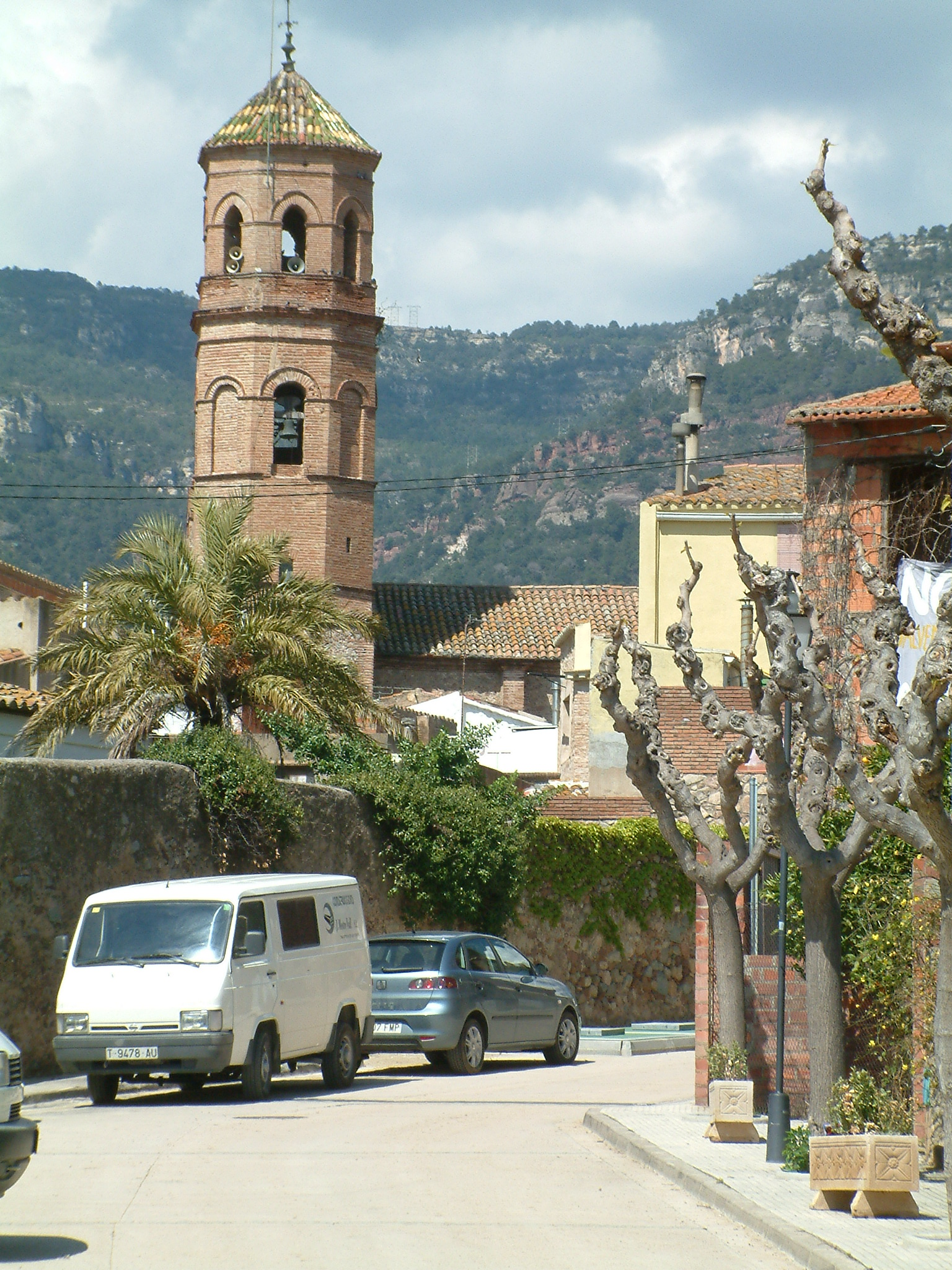
- Mare de Déu de la Llet church in Vilaplana

- Flag Coat of arms

- Location in Catalonia Location in Spain
- Coordinates: 41°13′46″N 1°2′3″E
- Country: Spain
- Autonomous community: Catalonia
- Province: Tarragona
- Comarca: Baix Camp

Government
  - Mayor: Tomàs Bigorra Munté (2015)

Area
  - Total: 23.2 km^{2} (9.0 sq mi)
- Elevation: 366 m (1,201 ft)

Population (2025-01-01)
  - Total: 549
  - Density: 23.7/km^{2} (61.3/sq mi)
- Demonym(s): Vilaplanenc, vilaplanenca
- Postal code: 43380
- Website: www.vilaplana.oasi.org

Vilaplana (Catalan pronunciation: [ˌviləˈplanə]) is a municipality in the comarca of Baix Camp, in the province of Tarragona, Catalonia, Spain. It has a population of 549 (register office, 2025).

The Serra de la Mussara, a subrange of the Prades Mountains rises north of the town. This mountain range is named after the abandoned village of La Mussara, located in the Vilaplana municipal term.

The church is dedicated to Mare de Déu de la Llet, the breastfeeding Virgin Mary.

== See also ==
- Prades Mountains
