= Colldejou =

- Municipality
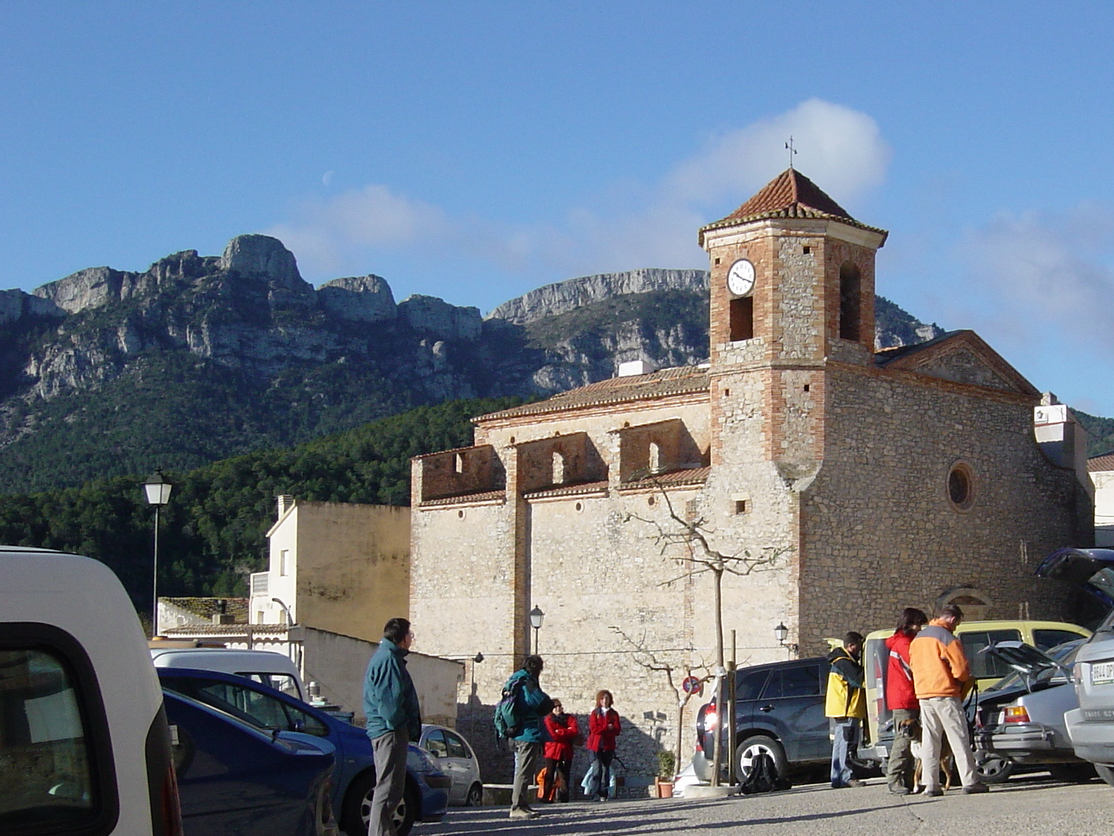
- View of Colldejou with the Mola de Colldejou in the background

- Flag Coat of arms

- Location in Spain Colldejou (Spain)
- Coordinates: 41°6′4″N 0°53′19″E
- Country: Spain
- Autonomous community: Catalonia
- Province: Tarragona
- Comarca: Baix Camp

Government
  - mayor: Jordi Sierra Salsench (2015)

Area
  - Total: 14.5 km^{2} (5.6 sq mi)
- Elevation: 431 m (1,414 ft)

Population (2025-01-01)
  - Total: 155
  - Density: 10.7/km^{2} (27.7/sq mi)
- Demonym(s): Colldejouenc, colldejouenca
- Postal code: 43310
- Website: www.colldejou.cat

Colldejou (Catalan pronunciation: [ˌkɔʎðəˈʒow]) is a municipality in the comarca of Baix Camp, in the province of Tarragona, Catalonia, Spain. It has a population of 155 (register office, 2025).

The town is located at the feet of the Mola de Colldejou, north of the Serra de Llaberia. The church is dedicated to Saint Lawrence.

== See also ==
- Serra de Llaberia
