= Baix Camp =

Coordinates: 41.1°N 1.1°E

- Comarca
- Coat of arms

- Country: Spain
- Autonomous community: Catalonia
- Region: Camp de Tarragona
- Province: Tarragona
- Capital: Reus
- Municipalities: List: L'Albiol, L'Aleixar, Alforja, Almoster, Arbolí, L'Argentera, Les Borges del Camp, Botarell, Cambrils, Capafonts, Castellvell del Camp, Colldejou, Duesaigües, La Febró, Maspujols, Mont-roig del Camp, Montbrió del Camp, Prades, Pratdip, Reus, Riudecanyes, Riudecols, Riudoms, La Selva del Camp, Vandellòs i l'Hospitalet de l'Infant, Vilanova d'Escornalbou, Vilaplana, Vinyols i els Arcs

Government
  - Body: Baix Camp Comarcal Council
  - President: Ernest Roigé (ERC) (2023-2025); Joan Josep Garcia (Junts) (2025-2027)

Area
  - Total: 697.3 km^{2} (269.2 sq mi)

Population (2014)
  - Total: 190,249
  - Density: 272.8/km^{2} (706.6/sq mi)
- Demonym
- Time zone: UTC+1 (CET)
  - Summer (DST): UTC+2 (CEST)
- Largest municipality: Reus

Baix Camp (Catalan pronunciation: [ˈbaʃ ˈkam]) is a comarca located in the region of Camp de Tarragona, in Catalonia.The capital is the city of Reus.

Baix Camp is located on the coast, between Tarragonès to the northeast and Baix Ebre to the south. It also borders the comarques of Priorat, Ribera d'Ebre, Conca de Barberà, Alt Camp, and Tarragonès.

== Population ==
Almost 150,000 people inhabit Baix Camp. The population has increased gently since the middle of the twentieth century, with population growth averaging 1.5% annually during the last three decades. Growth is not evenly distributed, however, but is strongly focused on Reus, the industrial and commercial centre of the region. Around two-thirds of the inhabitants of Baix Camp live in Reus, which from the seventeenth to the nineteenth centuries was the second most populous city in Catalonia, after Barcelona. Taking Catalonia as a whole, the place of Reus in the population rankings has now slipped to tenth. Within Baix Camp, the only other municipality with more than 10,000 inhabitants is Cambrils.

== Economy ==
In the agricultural sector almonds and hazelnuts are a major crops, together representing 30% of primary sector production. Viticulture has never regained the level of dominance that it enjoyed before the European Phylloxera epidemic that peaked in the 1870s. High dependency on almonds and hazelnuts nevertheless leaves the entire regional economy vulnerable to declining world market prices that have accompanied increased globalization of the agricultural sector. Some price protection is afforded to growers by protected designation for "Hazelnuts from Reus" which actually covers not just production from Reus but also that from neighboring Alt Camp, Tarragonès, Priorat, Conca de Barberà and Terra Alta.

== Municipalities ==
After the capital Reus, the major cities are Cambrils and Mont-roig del Camp; other significant towns are Riudoms and Selva del Camp.

Smaller municipalities:

- North of Reus, at the foot of Puig d'en Cama: Castellvell del Camp and Almoster.
- In the Mountains of Prades: Prades, Capafonts, Arbolí, and l'Albiol.
- In the valley of the river Maspujols: Vilaplana, l'Aleixar, and Maspujols.
- In the valley of the river Alforja: Alforja, les Borges del Camp, and Vinyols i els Arcs.
- Between the ranges of Puig Marí and Puig-server: Riudecols.
- In the valley of the ravine of Ànima Blanca: Montbrió del Camp, and Botarell.
- Near Mont-roig del Camp: Vilanova d'Escornalbou, Colldejou, and la Torre de Fontaubella
- At the western edge of the comarca: Pratdip and the municipality of Vandellòs i l'Hospitalet de l'Infant.

=== List of municipalities ===
Municipality	Population (2014)	Area km^{2}
L'Albiol	458	20.3
L'Aleixar	891	26.1
Alforja	1,859	38.2
Almoster	1,396	6.0
Arbolí	105	20.8
L'Argentera	146	10.1
Les Borges del Camp	2,077	8.2
Botarell	1,100	12.0
Cambrils	33,301	35.2
Capafonts	114	13.4
Castellvell del Camp	2,869	5.2
Colldejou	172	14.5
Duesaigües	239	13.6
La Febró	40	16.1
Maspujols	782	3.7
Mont-roig del Camp	12,148	63.3
Montbrió del Camp	2,650	10.7
Prades	626	32.6
Pratdip	685	36.3
Reus	104,962	52.8
Riudecanyes	1,142	17.1
Riudecols	1,254	19.5
Riudoms	6,546	32.4
La Selva del Camp	5,598	35.3
Vandellòs i l'Hospitalet de l'Infant	6,047	102.7
Vilanova d'Escornalbou	540	17.2
Vilaplana	630	23.2
Vinyols i els Arcs	1,872	10.8
• Total: 28	190,249	697.3
