= Pratdip =

- Municipality
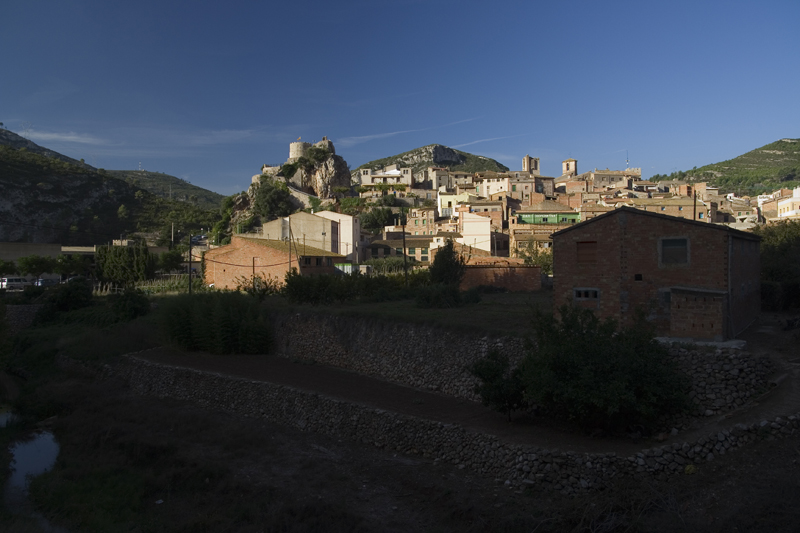
- Pratdip

- Seal

- Location in Spain Pratdip (Spain)
- Coordinates: 41°3′11″N 0°52′20″E
- Country: Spain
- Autonomous community: Catalonia
- Province: Tarragona
- Comarca: Baix Camp

Government
  - mayor: Joan Ma. Rovira Vernet (2015)

Area
  - Total: 36.3 km^{2} (14.0 sq mi)
- Elevation: 245 m (804 ft)

Population (2025-01-01)
  - Total: 781
  - Density: 21.5/km^{2} (55.7/sq mi)
- Demonym(s): Pratdipenc, pratdipenca
- Postal code: 43320
- Website: www.pratdip.cat

Pratdip (Catalan pronunciation: [ˌpɾadˈdip]) is a municipality in the comarca of Baix Camp, in the province of Tarragona, Catalonia, Spain. It has a population of 781 (register office, 2025).

Most of the people of Pratdip work in agriculture in the pastures, fields, and forests around the village. Prominent local agricultural products are hazelnuts and almonds.

== History ==
The oldest documents that refer to Pratdip by name are papal bulls of Pope Anastasius IV in 1154.

In medieval times the town was part of the Barony of Entença.
