= Aleix Vidal =

Spanish footballer

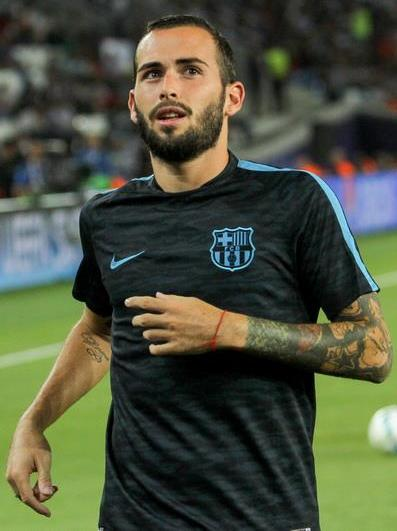
- Vidal with Barcelona in 2015

Personal information
- Full name: Aleix Vidal Parreu
- Date of birth: 21 August 1989 (age 37)
- Place of birth: Valls, Spain
- Height: 1.77 m (5 ft 10 in)
- Positions: Winger; right-back

Youth career
- 2000–2001: Valls
- 2001–2002: Barcelona
- 2002–2003: Cambrils
- 2003–2006: Real Madrid
- 2003–2004: → Gimnàstic (loan)
- 2006–2007: Reus
- 2007–2008: Espanyol
- 2007–2008: → Damm (loan)

Senior career*
Years	Team	Apps	(Gls)
2007	Reus	1	(0)
2008–2009	Espanyol B	2	(0)
2009	→ Panthrakikos (loan)	8	(0)
2009–2010	Pobla Mafumet	31	(7)
2009	Gimnàstic	1	(0)
2010–2011	Mallorca B	35	(6)
2011	Almería B	1	(2)
2011–2014	Almería	120	(17)
2014–2015	Sevilla	31	(4)
2015–2018	Barcelona	30	(3)
2018–2021	Sevilla	23	(0)
2019–2020	→ Alavés (loan)	29	(2)
2021–2023	Espanyol	56	(2)

International career
2015	Spain	1	(0)
2013–2019	Catalonia	4	(0)
- * Club domestic league appearances and goals as of 4 June 2023

Aleix Vidal Parreu (Catalan pronunciation: [əˈleʒ βiˈðal]; (Note: In isolation, Aleix and Vidal are pronounced [əˈleʃ] and [biˈðal] respectively.) born 21 August 1989) is a Spanish professional footballer. Mainly a right winger and a player of great speed, he can also operate as a right-back.

Having spent his early career at a string of lower-league and reserve teams, he became a regular at Almería, helping them to promotion to La Liga, and also won the Europa League with Sevilla before signing for Barcelona in 2015 for €17 million. Three seasons later, he returned to Sevilla.

Vidal won one cap for Spain, in 2015.

== Club career ==
=== Early years ===
Born in Valls, Tarragona, Catalonia, and raised in neighbouring Puigpelat, Vidal started his career as a forward. He signed for RCD Espanyol in 2007 to further his development after having already made his senior debut with CF Reus Deportiu, but never appeared for the former's first team, finishing his only senior season with the club on loan to Panthrakikos F.C. from Greece.

On 31 August 2009, Vidal moved to Segunda División side Gimnàstic de Tarragona, but spent the vast majority of the season with CF Pobla de Mafumet, the farm team. He joined RCD Mallorca in the middle of 2010, being assigned to the reserves in the Segunda División B.

=== Almería ===
In mid-June 2011, after suffering relegation, Vidal joined another reserve team also in that tier, UD Almería B. He made his debut for the Andalusians' main squad on 27 August 2011, against Córdoba CF. Shortly after, he was promoted to the first team and received the No. 8 jersey following the departure of Albert Crusat to Wigan Athletic.

In his second season, Vidal scored four goals in 37 games – 30 starts, nearly 2,600 minutes of action – helping to a return to La Liga after two years. On 6 August 2013, he renewed his link with Almería until 2017, making his top-flight debut on 19 August by starting in a 2–3 home loss to Villarreal CF, and scored his first goal roughly a month later, in a 4–2 defeat at Atlético Madrid.

=== Sevilla ===
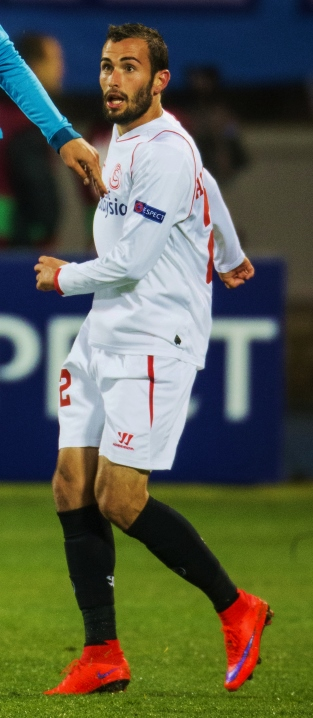
Vidal playing for Sevilla in 2015

On 16 June 2014, Vidal signed with Sevilla FC for a €3 million fee, penning a four-year contract. He made his competitive debut on 12 August in the 2014 UEFA Super Cup at the Cardiff City Stadium, playing 66 minutes before being substituted for fellow debutant Iago Aspas in a 2–0 loss to Real Madrid. He found the net on his league debut 11 days later, opening the 1–1 home draw against Valencia CF.

On 7 May 2015, in a game in which he featured as right-back until Coke entered the field in the 58th minute – he was often used by manager Unai Emery in that position during the campaign– Vidal scored twice and also provided an assist to Kevin Gameiro, in a 3–0 home win over ACF Fiorentina in the semi-finals of the UEFA Europa League. He started in the final 20 days later, a 3–2 defeat of FC Dnipro in Warsaw.

=== Barcelona ===
On 7 June 2015, Vidal signed a five-year contract with FC Barcelona, for an €18 million fee plus four in add-ons. He underwent a medical on the following day, being also officially presented. Due to an embargo placed on the club by FIFA for breaking rules on signing under-age foreign players, he was not permitted to appear in competitive games until January 2016.

Vidal made his official debut for the Blaugrana on 6 January 2016, replacing Dani Alves midway through the second half of a 4–1 home victory against former club Espanyol in the round of 16 of the Copa del Rey. Subsequently, he was completely ostracised by manager Luis Enrique.

On 14 January 2017, profiting from the absence of habitual starting right-back Sergi Roberto, Vidal opened his league account for Barcelona, contributing to a 5–0 rout of UD Las Palmas at the Camp Nou. On 11 February, in the last minutes of a 6–0 away win against Deportivo Alavés, he dislocated his ankle following a challenge by Théo Hernandez, being ruled out for the rest of the season.

=== Return to Sevilla ===
On 4 August 2018, Vidal returned to Sevilla for a fee of €8.5 million plus 2 million in variables. However, he struggled to settle in the first team, being also deemed surplus to requirements by new manager Julen Lopetegui in July 2019.

On 28 July 2019, Vidal was loaned out to fellow top-tier club Alavés in a season-long deal. On 1 July 2021, he and Sevilla parted ways by mutual consent.

=== Espanyol ===
Vidal returned to Espanyol on 18 August 2021, after agreeing to a two-year contract.

== International career ==
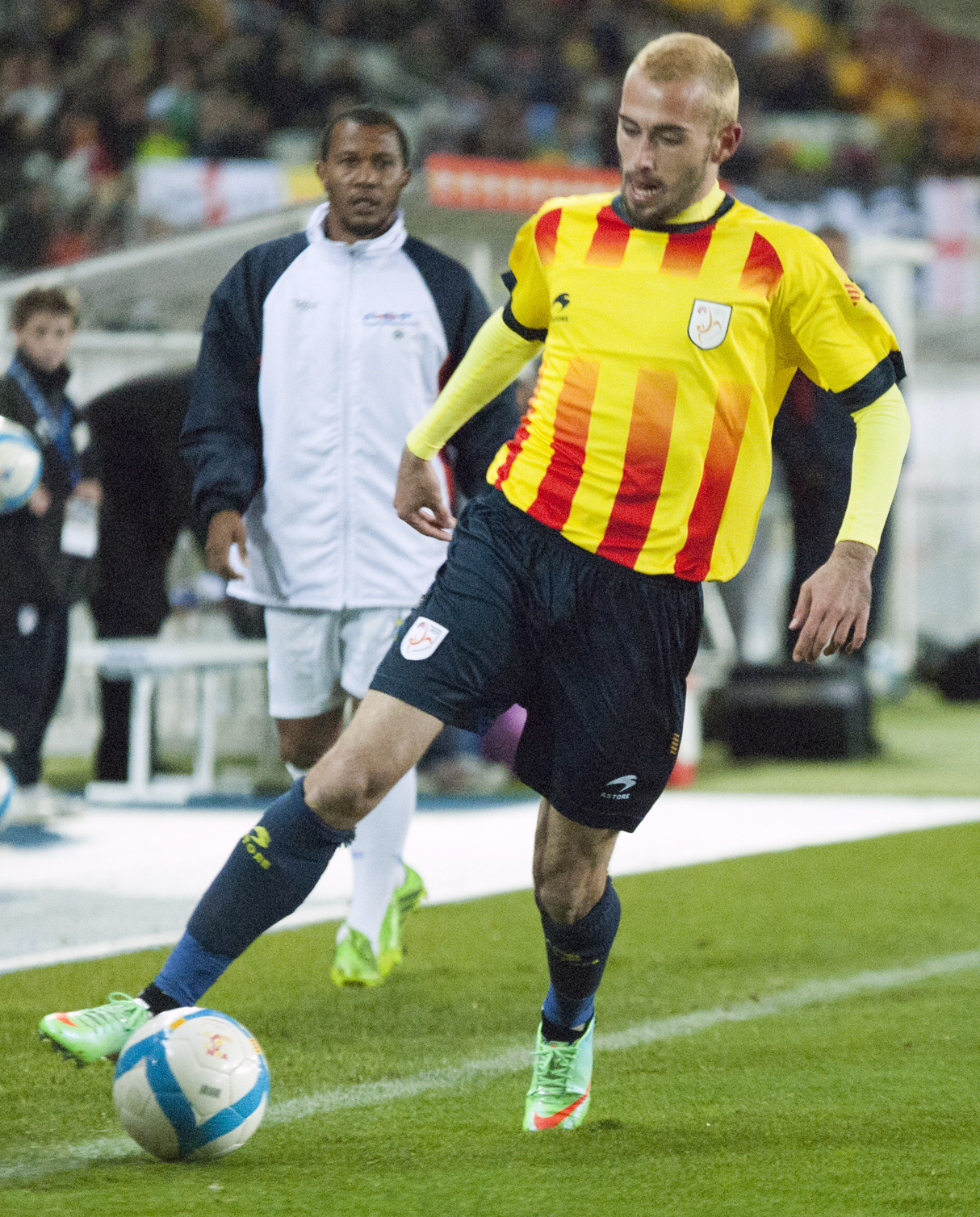
Vidal during his debut match for Catalonia

Vidal made his debut for Catalonia on 30 December 2013, playing the second half of a 4–1 win over Cape Verde at the Estadi Olímpic Lluís Companys. On 26 May 2015, he and Sevilla teammate Sergio Rico were the two players called up to the Spain national team for the first time, ahead of a friendly against Costa Rica and a UEFA Euro 2016 qualifying match against Belarus. He made his debut in the 2–1 victory against the former at the Estadio Reino de León, playing the entire first half before being substituted for his former Sevilla partner Vitolo.

== Career statistics ==
As of match played 28 May 2023

Appearances and goals by club, season and competition
Club	Season	League			National Cup		Continental		Other		Total	
Club	Season	Division	Apps	Goals	Apps	Goals	Apps	Goals	Apps	Goals	Apps	Goals
Reus	2006–07	Tercera División	1	0	—		—		—		1	0
Espanyol B	2008–09	Tercera División	2	0	—		—		—		2	0
Panthrakikos (loan)	2008–09	Super League Greece	8	0	—		—		—		8	0
Pobla Mafumet	2009–10	Tercera División	31	7	—		—		—		31	7
Gimnàstic	2009–10	Segunda División	1	0	0	0	—		—		1	0
Mallorca B	2010–11	Segunda División B	35	6	—		—		—		35	6
Almería B	2011–12	Segunda División B	1	2	—		—		—		1	2
Almería	2011–12	Segunda División	41	5	2	0	—		—		43	5
Almería	2012–13	Segunda División	37	4	4	1	—		4 (Note: Appearances in La Liga play-offs)	2	45	7
Almería	2013–14	La Liga	38	6	4	1	—		—		42	7
Almería	Total		116	15	10	2	—		4	2	130	19
Sevilla	2014–15	La Liga	31	4	4	0	11 (Note: Appearances in UEFA Europa League)	2	1 (Note: Appearance in UEFA Super Cup)	0	47	6
Barcelona	2015–16	La Liga	9	0	5	0	0	0	—		14	0
Barcelona	2016–17	La Liga	6	2	4	0	1 (Note: Appearances in UEFA Champions League)	0	1 (Note: Appearance in Supercopa de España)	0	12	2
Barcelona	2017–18	La Liga	15	1	5	1	4	0	1	0	25	2
Barcelona	Total		30	3	14	1	5	0	2	0	51	4
Sevilla	2018–19	La Liga	11	0	2	0	7	0	1	0	21	0
Sevilla	2020–21	La Liga	12	0	7	0	0	0	0	0	19	0
Sevilla	Total		23	0	9	0	7	0	1	0	40	0
Alavés (loan)	2019–20	La Liga	29	2	0	0	—		—		29	2
Espanyol	2021–22	La Liga	31	2	3	0	—		—		34	2
Espanyol	2022–23	La Liga	25	0	3	0	—		—		28	0
Espanyol	Total		56	2	6	0	—		—		62	2
Career total			364	41	43	3	23	2	8	2	438	48

== Honours ==
Sevilla

- UEFA Europa League: 2014–15

Barcelona

- La Liga: 2015–16, 2017–18
- Copa del Rey: 2015–16, 2016–17, 2017–18
- Supercopa de España: 2016

Individual

- UEFA Europa League Squad of the Season: 2014–15
