= Jordi Calavera =

Spanish footballer (born 1995)

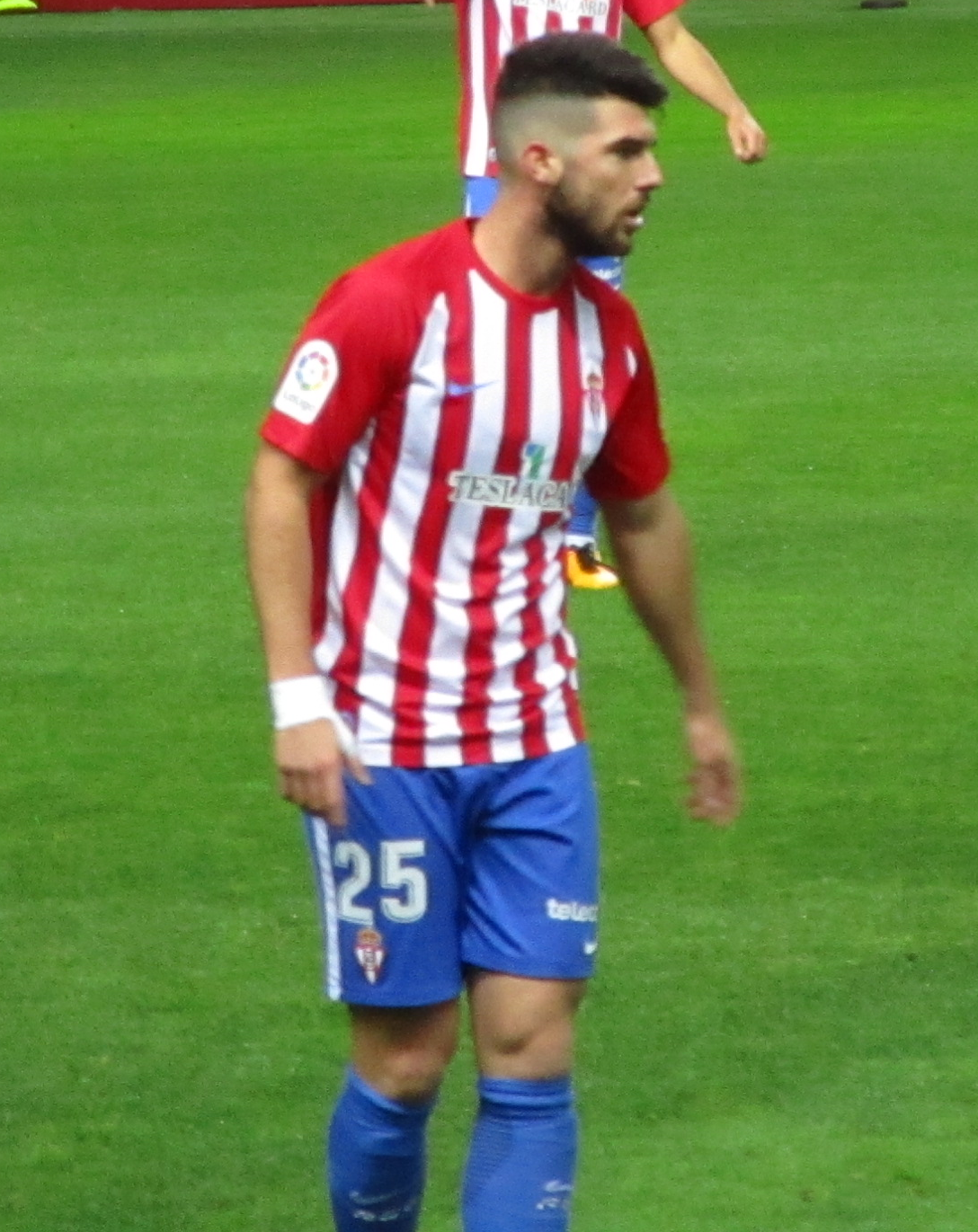
- Calavera with Sporting Gijón in 2017

Personal information
- Full name: Jordi Calavera Espinach
- Date of birth: 2 August 1995 (age 31)
- Place of birth: Cabra del Camp, Spain
- Height: 1.80 m (5 ft 11 in)
- Position: Right back

Youth career
- Valls
- 2008–2013: Gimnàstic

Senior career*
Years	Team	Apps	(Gls)
2013–2016	Gimnàstic	20	(1)
2014–2015	Pobla Mafumet	33	(2)
2015	→ Olot (loan)	15	(0)
2016–2020	Eibar	1	(0)
2016–2017	→ Lugo (loan)	40	(2)
2017–2018	→ Sporting Gijón (loan)	32	(1)
2019–2020	→ Girona (loan)	9	(0)
2020–2022	Girona	37	(0)
2022	→ Sporting Gijón (loan)	7	(0)
2022–2023	Lugo	20	(0)
2024	Sabadell	11	(0)
2024–2025	Amorebieta	17	(0)
2025–2026	Polonia Bytom	13	(0)
- * Club domestic league appearances and goals as of 08:46, 27 May 2026 (UTC)

Jordi Calavera Espinach (born 2 August 1995) is a Spanish professional footballer who plays as a right back,

== Club career ==
Born in Cabra del Camp, Tarragona, Catalonia, Calavera finished his youth formation with Gimnàstic de Tarragona, and was called up to the first team by manager Santi Castillejo for the pre-season in 2013. He made his senior debut on 25 August of that year, starting in a 1–2 home defeat against Lleida Esportiu in the Segunda División B.

Two days later, Calavera renewed his link with Nàstic, signing until 2016, and was definitely promoted to the main squad, as a replacement to Sporting de Gijón B-bound Alberto Benito. However, he spent the whole campaign mainly as a backup to Juanjo, as his side missed out promotion in the play-offs.

On 19 January 2015, after being again second-choice (now to another new signing, Gerard Valentín), Calavera was loaned to UE Olot also in the third level, until June. On 9 September he made his professional debut, starting in a 2–2 home draw against Girona FC for the season's Copa del Rey (5–4 success on penalties).

On 27 September 2015 Calavera made his Segunda División debut, coming on as a half-time substitute for Xisco Campos in a 0–0 away draw against Real Valladolid. On 17 October he scored his first goal in the category, netting the first in a 2–1 home success over Bilbao Athletic.

On 23 January 2016, Calavera was excluded from the first team after rejecting to sign a contract renewal despite previously verbally agreeing to it. On 8 March he apologized with the fans, but announced a pre-contract with La Liga side SD Eibar, being officially announced at his new club on 1 July.

On 12 August 2016, Calavera was loaned to CD Lugo in the second tier, for one year. On 29 August of the following year, he extended his contract with the Armeros until 2021 and was immediately loaned to fellow second division club Sporting de Gijón.

Upon returning, Calavera was assigned to the main squad, and made his top tier debut on 5 May 2019 by playing the latter minutes of a 1–0 home defeat of Real Betis. On 20 August, he was loaned to Girona in division two, with a buyout clause.

On 30 August 2020, Calavera terminated his contract with the Armeros, and returned to Girona on a two-year deal five days later. On 31 January 2022, he returned to Sporting also in a temporary deal.

On 10 July 2022, Calavera returned to Lugo on a two-year contract.

On 7 August 2024, Calavera moved to Amorebieta.

On 7 July 2025, Calavera moved abroad for the first time, joining Polish second tier club Polonia Bytom on a one-year contract, with a one-year extension option.

== Personal life ==
Calavera's younger brother Josep is also a footballer. A midfielder, he too was groomed at Nàstic before joining FC Barcelona.
