= Josep Calavera =

Spanish footballer (born 1999)

Personal information
- Full name: Josep Calavera Espinach
- Date of birth: 2 October 1999 (age 27)
- Place of birth: Cabra del Camp, Spain
- Height: 1.81 m (5 ft 11 in)
- Position: Midfielder

Team information
- Current team: Ibiza (on loan from Tenerife)

Youth career
- Valls
- 2013–2017: Gimnàstic
- 2017–2018: Barcelona

Senior career*
| Years | Team | Apps | (Gls) |
| 2016–2017 | Pobla Mafumet | 7 | (0) |
| 2018–2019 | Barcelona B | 0 | (0) |
| 2018–2019 | → Lleida Esportiu (loan) | 22 | (1) |
| 2019–2020 | Castellón | 21 | (0) |
| 2020–2022 | Atlético Madrid B | 26 | (0) |
| 2021–2022 | → Deportivo La Coruña (loan) | 13 | (0) |
| 2022–2025 | Castellón | 83 | (1) |
| 2025– | Tenerife | 10 | (0) |
| 2026 | → Hércules (loan) | 14 | (0) |
| 2026– | → Ibiza (loan) | 0 | (0) |
- * Club domestic league appearances and goals as of 10 June 2026

Josep Calavera Espinach (born 2 October 1999) is a Spanish professional footballer who plays as a midfielder for UD Ibiza, on loan from CD Tenerife.

== Career ==
Born in Cabra del Camp, Tarragona, Catalonia, Calavera was a Gimnàstic de Tarragona youth graduate. He made his senior debut with the farm team on 28 August 2016 at the age of 16, coming on as a substitute in a 4–1 Tercera División away loss to Palamós CF.

On 1 August 2017, Calavera moved to FC Barcelona and returned to the youth setup. On 27 July of the following year, after finishing his formation, he was loaned to Segunda División B side Lleida Esportiu for the season.

On 1 August 2019, after returning from loan, Calavera terminated his contract with the Blaugrana, and signed for CD Castellón in the third division just hours later. The following 31 January, he was transferred to Atlético Madrid and was assigned to the reserves in the same category.

On 2 July 2021, Calavera was loaned to Deportivo de La Coruña also in division three, for one year. On 30 July of the following year, he returned to Castellón on a one-year deal.

On 17 July 2023, after establishing himself as a first-choice, Calavera renewed his link with the Orelluts until 2025. He remained a starter during the campaign, appearing in 29 matches as the club achieved promotion to Segunda División.

Calavera made his professional debut on 1 September 2024, playing the last 11 minutes in a 2–0 away win over Burgos CF. On 26 June of the following year, he signed a three-year contract with CD Tenerife, freshly relegated to the third division.

On 21 January 2026, Calavera was loaned to Hércules CF, also in Primera Federación, until June. On 15 July, he moved to fellow league team UD Ibiza, also in a temporary deal.

== Personal life ==
Calavera's older brother Jordi is also a footballer. A right-back, he too was groomed at Nàstic.
