= Tossal Gros =

Tossal Gros de Miramar
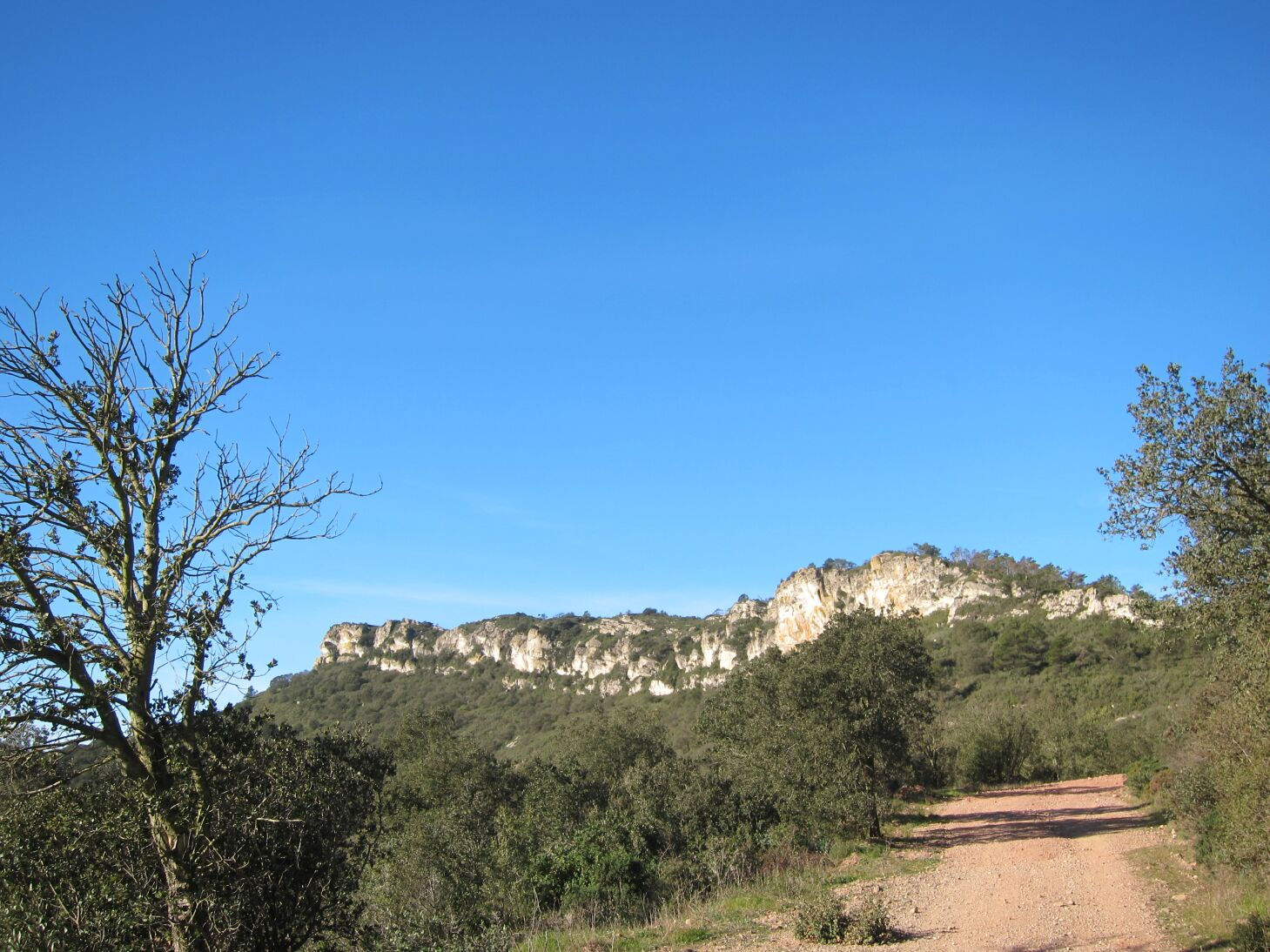
- Tossal Gros.

Highest point
- Elevation: 867 m (2,844 ft)
- Coordinates: 41°22′31.22″N 1°14′21.79″E

Geography
- Location: Conca de Barberà, Alt Camp, Catalonia
- Parent range: Serra de Miramar, Catalan Pre-Coastal Range

Climbing
- First ascent: Unknown

Tossal Gros de Miramar, or simply Tossal Gros, is a mountain of the Catalan Pre-Coastal Range, Catalonia, Spain. It has an elevation of 866.6 metres above sea level.

This mountain is the highest summit of the Serra de Miramar; it is located between the municipal limits of Figuerola del Camp, in the Alt Camp comarca, and Montblanc, Conca de Barberà.

== See also ==
- Catalan Pre-Coastal Range
- Mountains of Catalonia
