= Els Garidells =

- Municipality
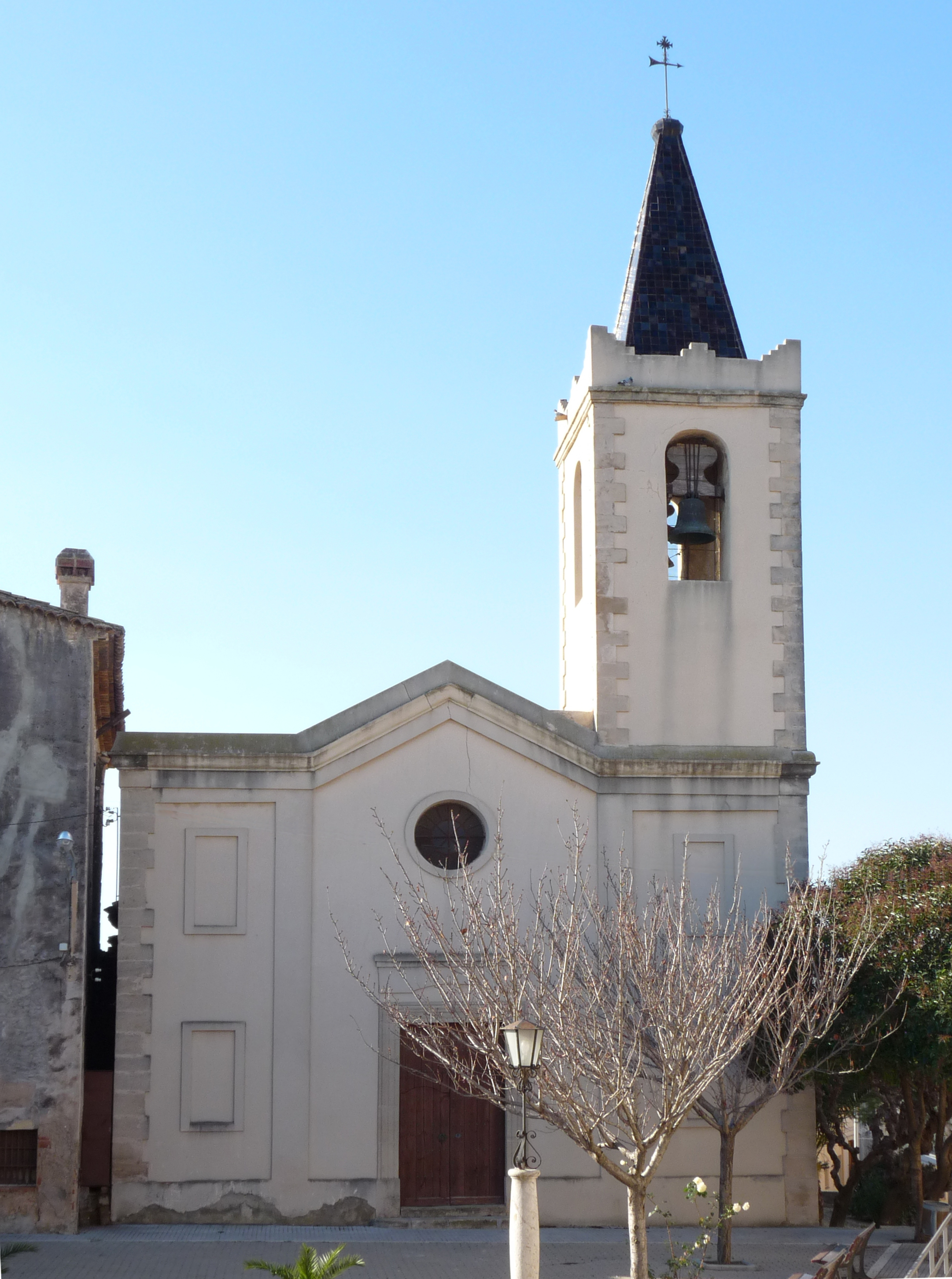

- Location in Catalonia
- Coordinates: 41°12′33″N 1°14′55″E
- Country: Spain
- Community: Catalonia
- Province: Tarragona
- Comarca: Alt Camp

Government
  - Mayor: Marc Bigordà Prió (2015)

Area
  - Total: 3.1 km^{2} (1.2 sq mi)
- Elevation: 132 m (433 ft)

Population (2025-01-01)
  - Total: 211
  - Density: 68/km^{2} (180/sq mi)
- Demonym(s): Garidellenc, garidellenca
- Postal code: 43153
- Website: www.garidells.altanet.org

Els Garidells (Catalan pronunciation: [əlz gəɾiˈðeʎs]) is a municipality in the comarca of the Alt Camp in Catalonia, Spain. It is situated on the right bank of the Francolí river. A local road links the village with the N-240 road between Valls and Tarragona. It has a population of 211 (register office, 2025).

Els Garidells became part of the Alt Camp in the comarcal revision of 1990: previously it formed part of the Tarragonès.
