= El Pla de Santa Maria =

- Municipality
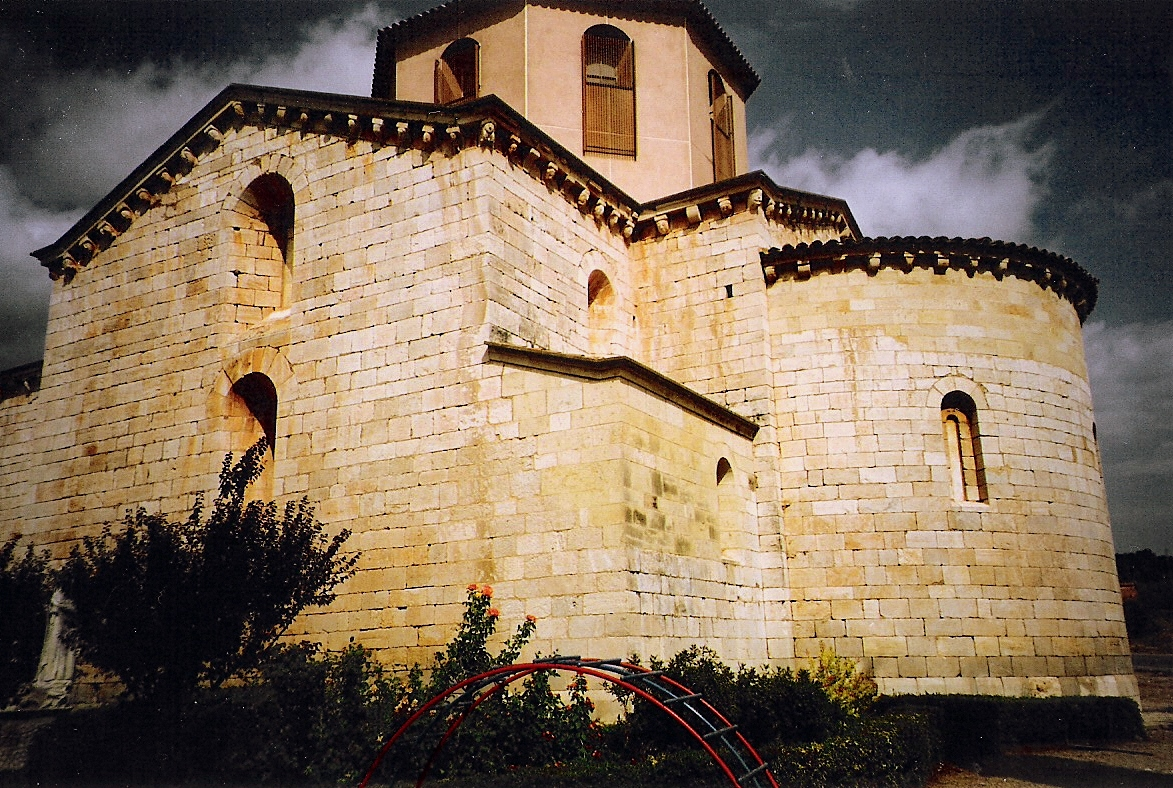
- St. Ramon's church

- Flag Coat of arms

- Location in Catalonia
- Coordinates: 41°21′45″N 1°17′29″E
- Country: Spain
- Community: Catalonia
- Province: Tarragona
- Comarca: Alt Camp

Government
  - Mayor: Mateu Montserrat Miquel (2015)

Area
  - Total: 35.0 km^{2} (13.5 sq mi)
- Elevation: 381 m (1,250 ft)

Population (2025-01-01)
  - Total: 2,408
  - Density: 68.8/km^{2} (178/sq mi)
- Demonym: Planenc
- Website: www.pla.altanet.org

El Pla de Santa Maria (Catalan pronunciation: [əl ˈpla ðə ˈsantə məˈɾiə]) is a municipality in the comarca of the Alt Camp in Catalonia, Spain. It is situated at the foot of the Miramar range. The municipality is served by the A-2 motorway and is linked to Valls by the T-200 road. It has a population of 2,408 (register office, 2025).
