= Món Casteller Human Tower Museum of Catalonia =

Museum about the Catalan tradition of "Castells" (human towers and human pyramids)

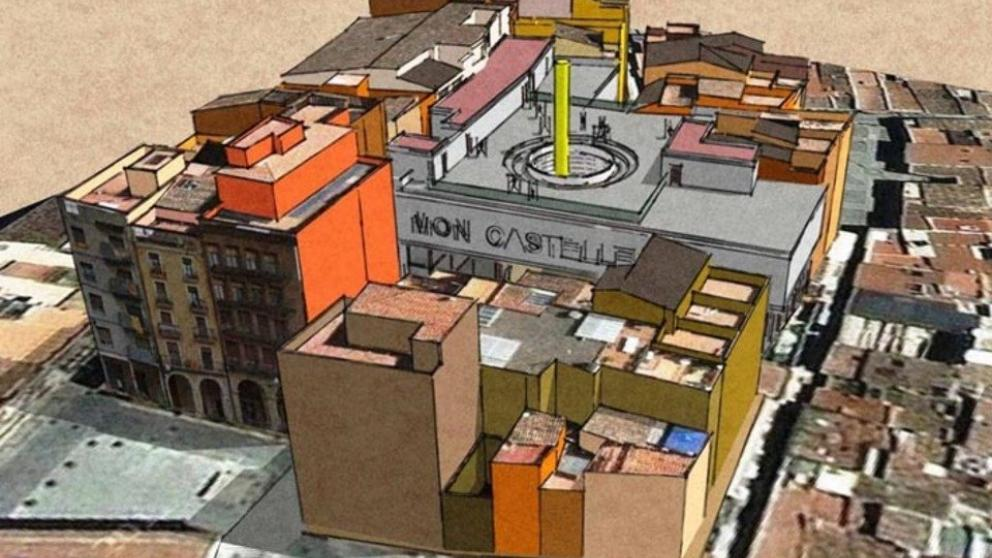
3D drawing

Món Casteller. The Human Tower Museum of Catalonia (MCC in Catalan) is a museum project that is being built in the city of Valls, capital of the Alt Camp and considered the birthplace and zero point for human towers. MCC is a project promoted by the Catalan Government's Department of Culture, the Tarragona County Council, Valls City Hall and the Coordinator of Catalan Human Tower Groups. The Catalan Government will preside over the consortium and Valls City Hall will execute the museum and secretariat works.

== From the idea to the project ==
The proposal to create a museum dedicated to human towers in the city of Valls is strongly linked to the Valls historian and photographer Pere Català Roca. At the end of the 1950s, he was already leading a proposal to set up a centre that would spread the human tower culture. Accordingly, exhibitions were held in Valls and in Tarragona, in 1964 and in 1968, to back up the proposal that Català Roca presented once again during the 1977 Congress of Catalan Culture and in the 1982 Congress on Traditional and Popular Culture.

The Human Tower of the Museum of Catalonia's first board meeting was held on 26 July 1978.

The initiative would be taken up by the Valls Institute of Studies, creating a commission in 1984 that would offer continuity to the other actions that the entity had already been carrying out, like the human tower exhibition held in the Old Hospital of Sant Roc in 1981. It moved to the Can Segarra building in 1985, in Plaça del Blat number 9, where a permanent exhibition was set up to coincide with the city's Main Sant Joan Festival. Due to structural defects, the property was forced to close down just two years later.

In 1997 a new phase was started in which the drafting of the museum project began. It was drafted by a commission of specialists who were convened by the Catalan Government's Department of Culture, Valls City Hall and the Valls Museum.

The intention of locating the Museum in Can Segarra wasn't abandoned until 2003 when the old military barracks were proposed which, until then, had been occupied by the Narcís Oller Secondary School, located in Plaça del Quarter.

In 2007, Valls City Hall once again announced a change of location with the creation of a new building outside the city centre, in the area of Ruanes.

On Saturday 17 October 2009, coinciding with the 40th anniversary of the Xiquets de Valls, the Human Tower Museum project was presented in public in the Pati square and with the participation of the four consortium members.

The first executive architectural project was formalised in 2010. In November of the same year, the UNESCO recognised the human towers as Intangible Cultural Heritage of Humanity.

Finally, in 2013, the project was re-dimensioned changing to the Plaça del Blat, the zero point for human towers in the heart of Valls Old Town.

Obtaining the land is carried out by mutual agreement between the INCASÒL, the Catalan Land Institute, assigned to the Catalan Government- and Valls City Hall. The price is set at €746,721.

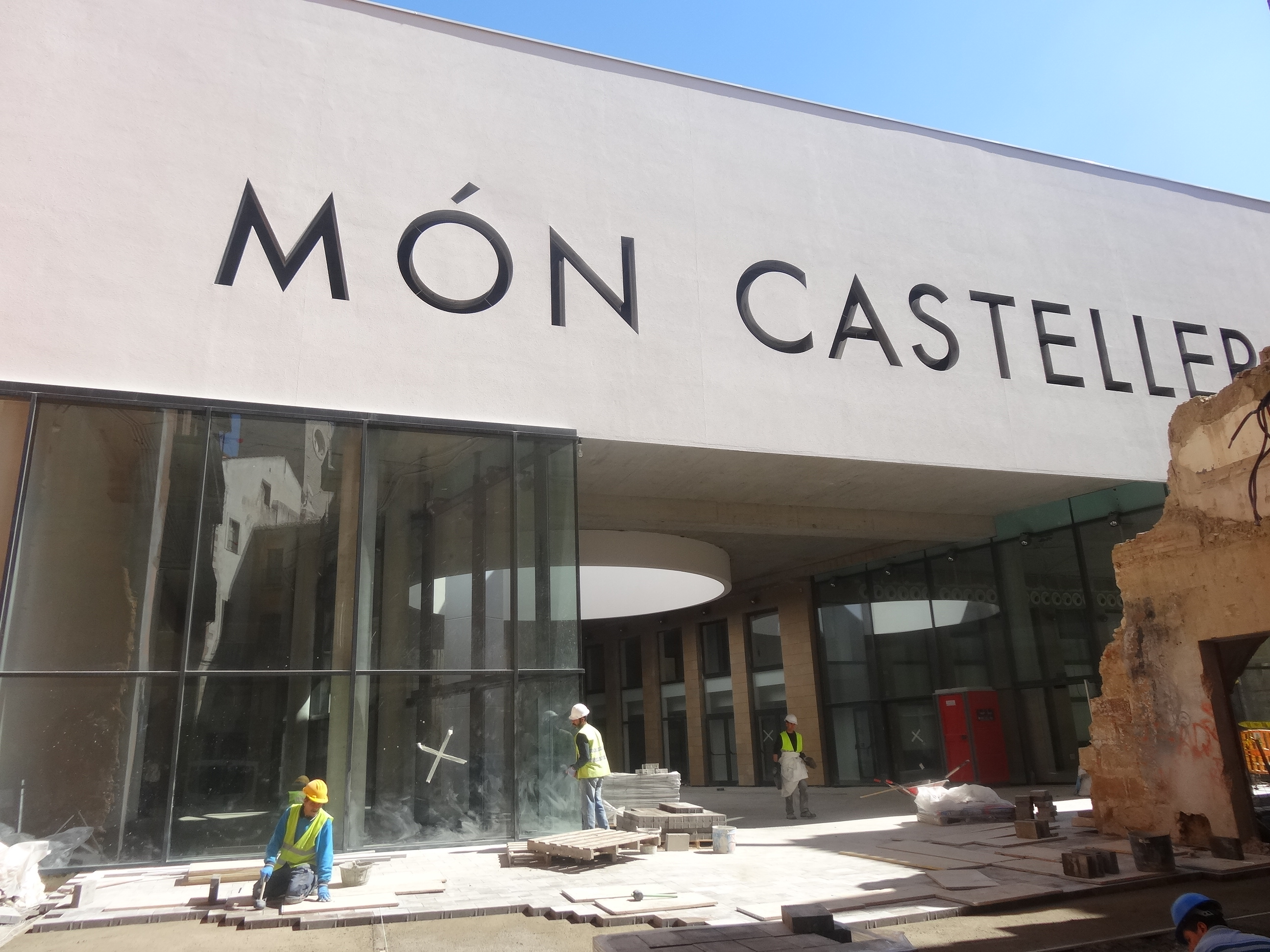
Working in Món Casteller - The Human Towers Experience

On 22 April 2014, demolition started on the 29 properties that would make way for the space required to build this new cultural and tourist facility. The demolition was done manually given the age of the properties and their dilapidated state.

On Friday, 27 March 2015, the newly formed piece of land, with 1,559 m2, held the act to start the construction work. It was a public event with 34 simultaneous pillars made by the human tower groups on the spot where the new building would be erected. Another eleven human tower groups were represented by their presidents. In total, 45 groups participated in the celebration. The Muixeranga d’Algemesí, the Moixiganga de Tarragona and the one from Valls also attended as cultural expressions of the origins of human towers. After this first joint pillar and after the enxanetes placed the shield of each group inside an urn representing the first stone, the aerial show company, Sacude, took over by staging a show based on vertical contemporary dance on scaffolding that was 15 metres high, reinterpreting the values of the human towers: strength, balance, courage and good sense.

On Thursday 16 April 2015, the company Carbonell Figueres, which had won the tender in which 35 companies had participated, started the construction work on the new facility. This consisted of constructing the building's shell. The cost is €2,727,331.

== The museum ==
The building is not a closed space, rather it connects the two arcaded Plaça del Blat and Plaça de l’Oli, maintaining their ancestral urban continuity. It also creates a new, circular-shaped plaza that opens up in a spectacular way in the medieval section. A 20 m-high pillar of light stands over the building. The chromatic changes of this luminous lighthouse symbolise the different colours of the shirts worn by the human tower groups.

On the ground floor are the reception area, the shop, the cafeteria and, as the zenith of the visit, the immersive and sensorial area.

The mezzanine opens up to the pedagogical area, the archive and the Human Tower Documentation Centre (CEDOCA in Catalan) which safeguards the documentation related to human towers and its own resources.

The first floor holds the area for experiences made up of the permanent museum exhibition and there is also a room for temporary exhibitions.

The basement is the headquarters of the Coordinator of Catalan Human Tower Groups, while the roof opens onto a viewpoint terrace with views of the highest bell tower in Catalonia.

=== The museum project ===
The Human Tower Museum of Catalonia project has been elaborated from the museum project that began between 1997 and 2003 and it will be drawn up by a commission convened by the Catalan Government's Department of Culture, Valls City Hall and the Valls Museum.

The proposal reflects the human tower motto "strength, balance, courage and good sense" which comes from Josep Anselm Clavé's poem "Los Xiquets de Valls" from 1867. Likewise, under the name of "A tower in three acts" explores the sensations and emotions that surround the human tower events, using audiovisual and multimedia resources to achieve this. The amount to draft and manage this museum project is €139,460. On entering the Museum, the visitor will encounter a large-scale audiovisual in a room that will connect the building's two floors. This first encounter aims to symbolise the courage of the human tower builders and the vertigo endured by the "enxaneta", the child who crowns the tower.

The second part is dedicated to good sense and balance that represent wisdom, experience and technique. It also presents the progress of this phenomenon in terms of historical consolidation, expansion, technique refinement and the role of the city of Valls as the human tower birthplace. At this point, five circular nodes that symbolise the base formation of the towers take the visitor along the route that includes dynamic and visual panels.

The last part, dedicated to strength, culminates with a multimedia system that shows the burst of joy, emotion and enthusiasm when the tower is completed. This is based on the use of various audiovisual languages like real images, infographics, or animated resources. The undertaking consists of making 6 large audiovisuals and the 2 interactive ones that were considered in the museum project. The cost of the audiovisual production and post-production has been €428,445.

In addition, the "Taula Lèxica", which is also made up of dozens of specialists, has been given the task of selecting terms included within the human tower lexicon for the museum project.

== The Old Town, the museum's headquarters ==
The building of the Món Casteller. The Human Tower Museum of Catalonia is one of the actions promoted by Valls City Hall in order to regenerate the city's Old Town. Following the example set by other European cities, the aim is to carry out urban remodelling by creating new places and the enhancement of the urban fabric. Likewise, there will be the installation of new civic and cultural facilities in newly built buildings or reforms will be carried out on existing properties.

In Valls, all of this has led to the construction of the Espai Ca Creus, which groups together the services offered by the Civic Centre, the City Hall's Department of Culture, the Valls Jove Youth Service but, overall, the Carles Cardó County Library, inaugurated in 2014.

== Videos ==
"The Human Towers Experience. Museu Casteller de Catalunya - Valls" on YouTube

"Gestes d'ahir, símbols d'avui. Discover the museum's photographic collections" on YouTube

Discover the museum's building before setting museography
