= El Pont d'Armentera =

- Municipality
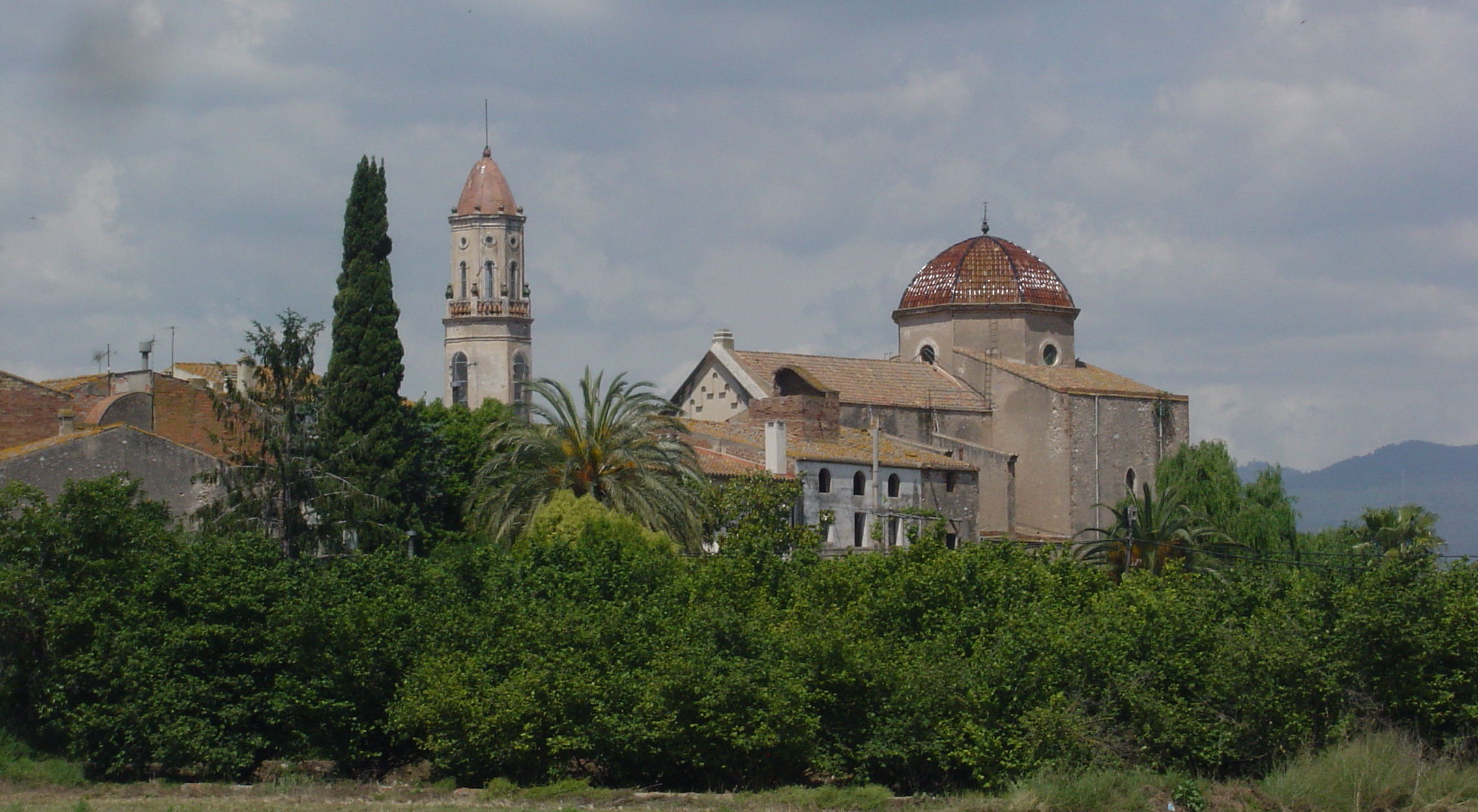
- Santes Creus Monastery

- Flag Coat of arms

- Location in Spain El Pont d'Armentera (Spain)
- Coordinates: 41°23′5″N 1°21′48″E
- Country: Spain
- Autonomous community: Catalonia
- Province: Tarragona
- Comarca: Alt Camp

Government
  - Mayoress: Montserrat Feliu (2019)

Area
  - Total: 21.7 km^{2} (8.4 sq mi)
- Elevation: 349 m (1,145 ft)

Population (2025-01-01)
  - Total: 500
  - Density: 23/km^{2} (60/sq mi)
- Website: www.pontdarmentera.altanet.org

El Pont d'Armentera (Catalan pronunciation: [əl ˈpɔn dəɾmənˈteɾə]; locally [lu ˈpɔn -]) is a municipality in the comarca of Alt Camp, Tarragona, Catalonia, Spain.

It has a population of 500 (register office, 2025).
