= Vallmoll =

- Municipality
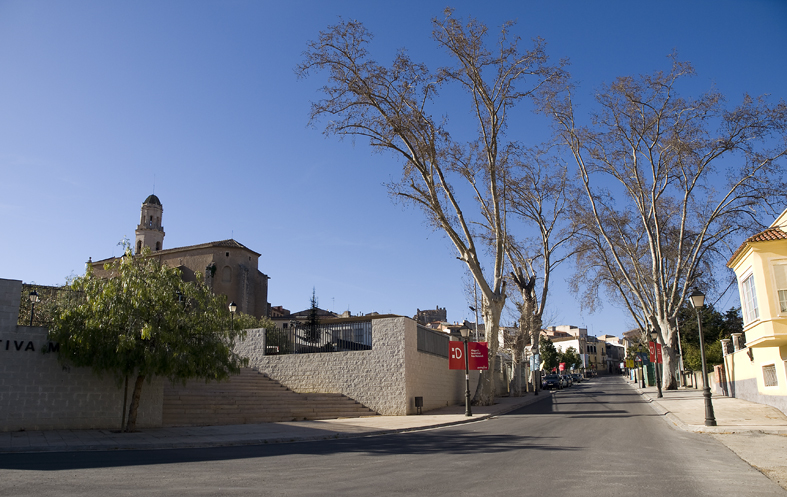
- Vallmoll

- Flag Coat of arms

- Location in Catalonia
- Coordinates: 41°14′N 1°15′E
- Country: Spain
- Community: Catalonia
- Province: Tarragona
- Comarca: Alt Camp

Government
  - Mayor: Josep Lluís Cusidó Prats (2015)

Area
  - Total: 16.7 km^{2} (6.4 sq mi)

Population (2025-01-01)
  - Total: 1,997
  - Density: 120/km^{2} (310/sq mi)
- Website: www.vallmoll.cat

Vallmoll (Catalan pronunciation: [ˌbaʎˈmɔʎ], lit. 'wet/soft valley') is a municipality in the comarca of Alt Camp, Tarragona, Catalonia, Spain. It has a population of 1,997 (register office, 2025). It is located just off the N-240 road.
