= Alcover =

- Municipality
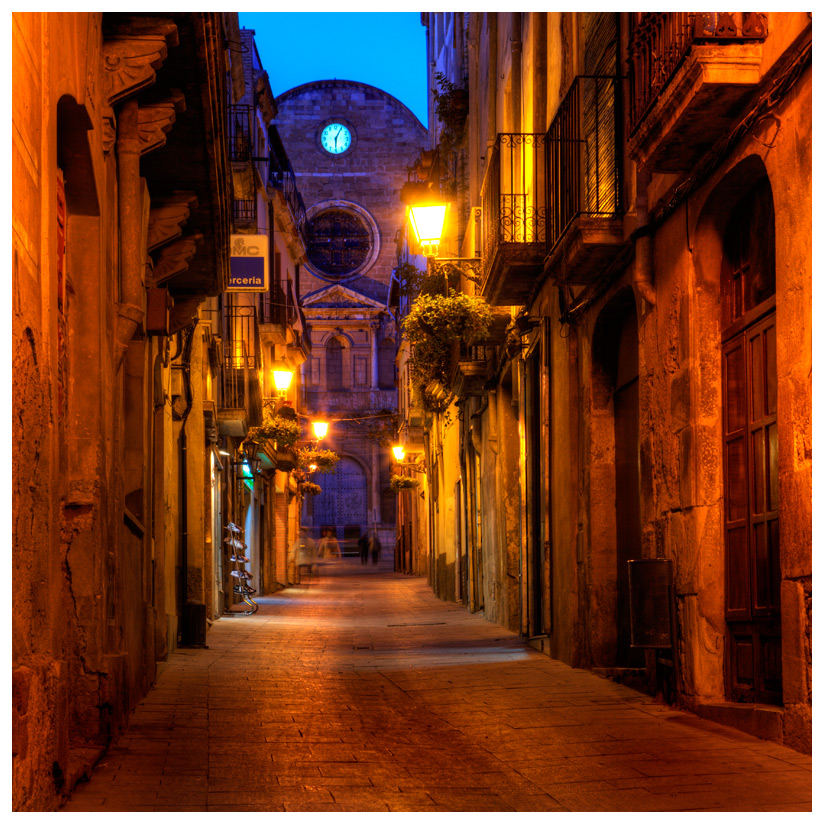
- Carrer del Rec, with the Church of the Assumption in the background

- Coat of arms

- Location in Catalonia
- Coordinates: 41°16′N 1°10′E
- Country: Spain
- Autonomous community: Catalonia
- Province: Tarragona
- Comarca: Alt Camp

Government
  - Mayor: Robert Figueras Roca

Area
  - Total: 46.0 km^{2} (17.8 sq mi)
- Elevation: 243 m (797 ft)

Population (2025-01-01)
  - Total: 5,362
  - Density: 117/km^{2} (302/sq mi)
- Demonym(s): alcoverenc, alcoverenca
- Postal code: 43460–43461
- Website: alcover.cat

Alcover (Catalan pronunciation: [əlkuˈβe]) is a municipality in the comarca of Alt Camp, Tarragona, Catalonia, Spain.

It has a population of 5,362 (register office, 2025).

The Prades Mountains are located in the vicinity of this municipality.

It is the birthplace of the footballer Kiko Casilla.
