= Alió =

- Municipality
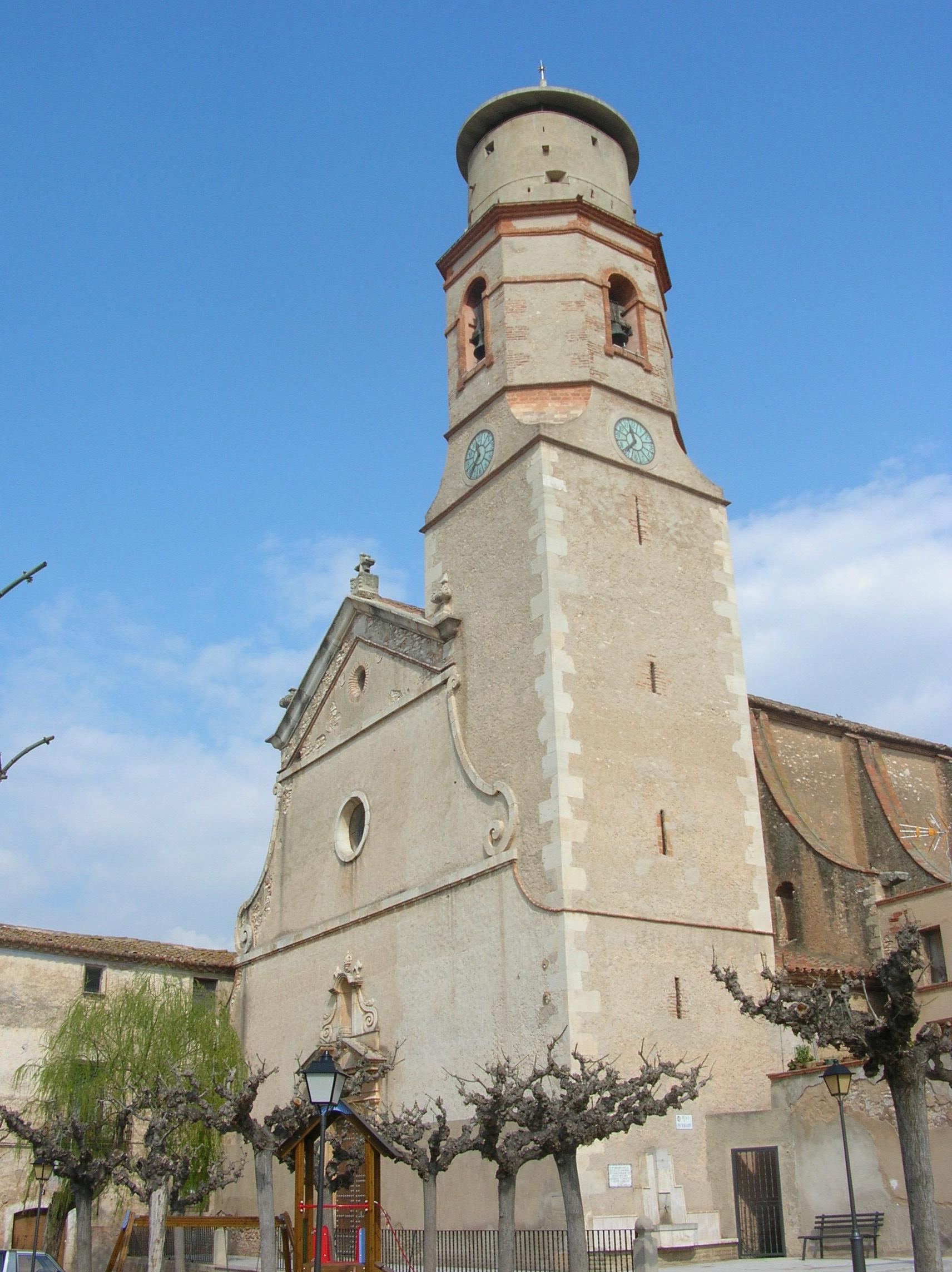
- St. Bartholomew's Church, Alió

- Flag Coat of arms

- Location in Catalonia
- Coordinates: 41°18′N 1°18′E
- Country: Spain
- Community: Catalonia
- Province: Tarragona
- Comarca: Alt Camp

Government
  - Mayor: Francisco Jofre Vallvé (2015)

Area
  - Total: 7.2 km^{2} (2.8 sq mi)

Population (2025-01-01)
  - Total: 496
  - Density: 69/km^{2} (180/sq mi)
- Website: www.alio.oasi.org

Alió (Catalan pronunciation: [əliˈo]) is a municipality in the comarca of Alt Camp, Tarragona, Catalonia, Spain.

It has a population of 496 (register office, 2025).
