= Bràfim =

- Municipality
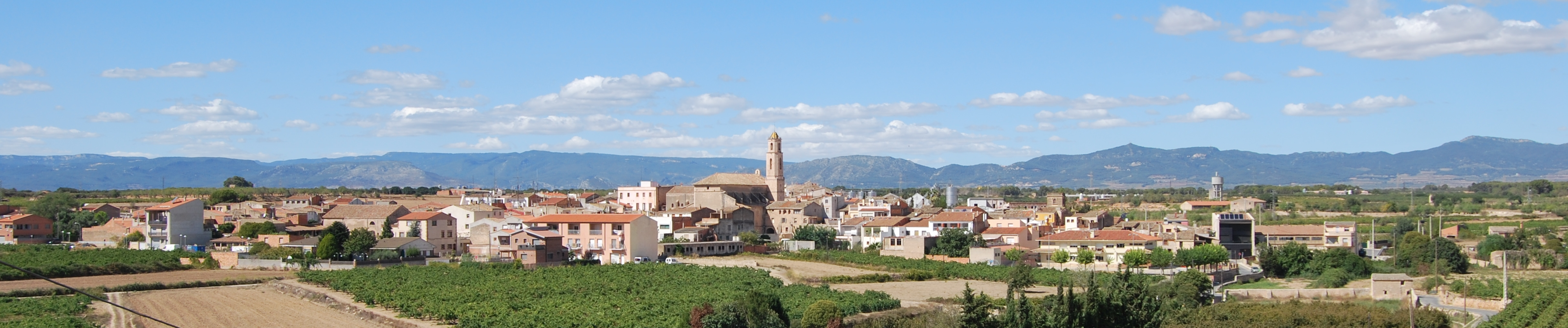
- General view

- Coat of arms

- Location in Spain Bràfim (Spain)
- Coordinates: 41°16′14″N 1°20′30″E
- Country: Spain
- Autonomous community: Catalonia
- Province: Tarragona
- Comarca: Alt Camp

Government
  - mayor: Xavier Rius Garcia (2015)

Area
  - Total: 6.4 km^{2} (2.5 sq mi)
- Elevation: 263 m (863 ft)

Population (2025-01-01)
  - Total: 697
  - Density: 110/km^{2} (280/sq mi)
- Demonym(s): Brafimenc, brafimenca
- Postal code: 43812
- Website: www.brafim.cat

Location of Bràfim municipal term within Alt Camp comarca

Bràfim (Catalan pronunciation: [ˈbɾafim]) is a municipality in the comarca of Alt Camp, province of Tarragona, Catalonia, in north-eastern Spain. This town produces quite good table wine.

It has a population of 697 (register office, 2025).
