= Vilabella =

- Municipality
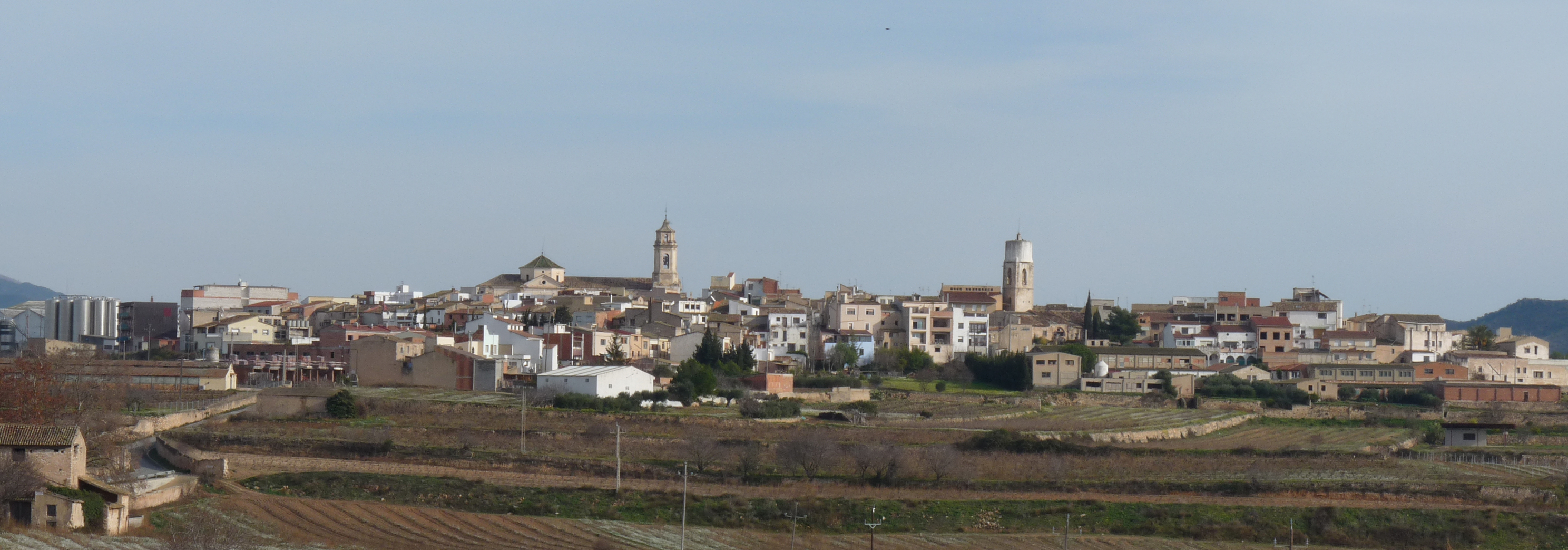

- Location in Spain Vilabella (Spain)
- Coordinates: 41°14′57″N 1°19′53″E
- Country: Spain
- Autonomous community: Catalonia
- Province: Tarragona
- Comarca: Alt Camp

Government
  - Mayor: Joan Ma. Sanahuja Segú (2015) (CiU)

Area
  - Total: 18.2 km^{2} (7.0 sq mi)
- Elevation: 245 m (804 ft)

Population (2025-01-01)
  - Total: 724
  - Density: 39.8/km^{2} (103/sq mi)
- Postal code: 43886
- Website: www.vilabella.cat

Vilabella (Catalan pronunciation: [ˌviləˈβeʎə]) is a municipality in the comarca of Alt Camp, Tarragona, Catalonia, Spain. It has a population of 724 (register office, 2025).
