= El Rourell =

- Municipality
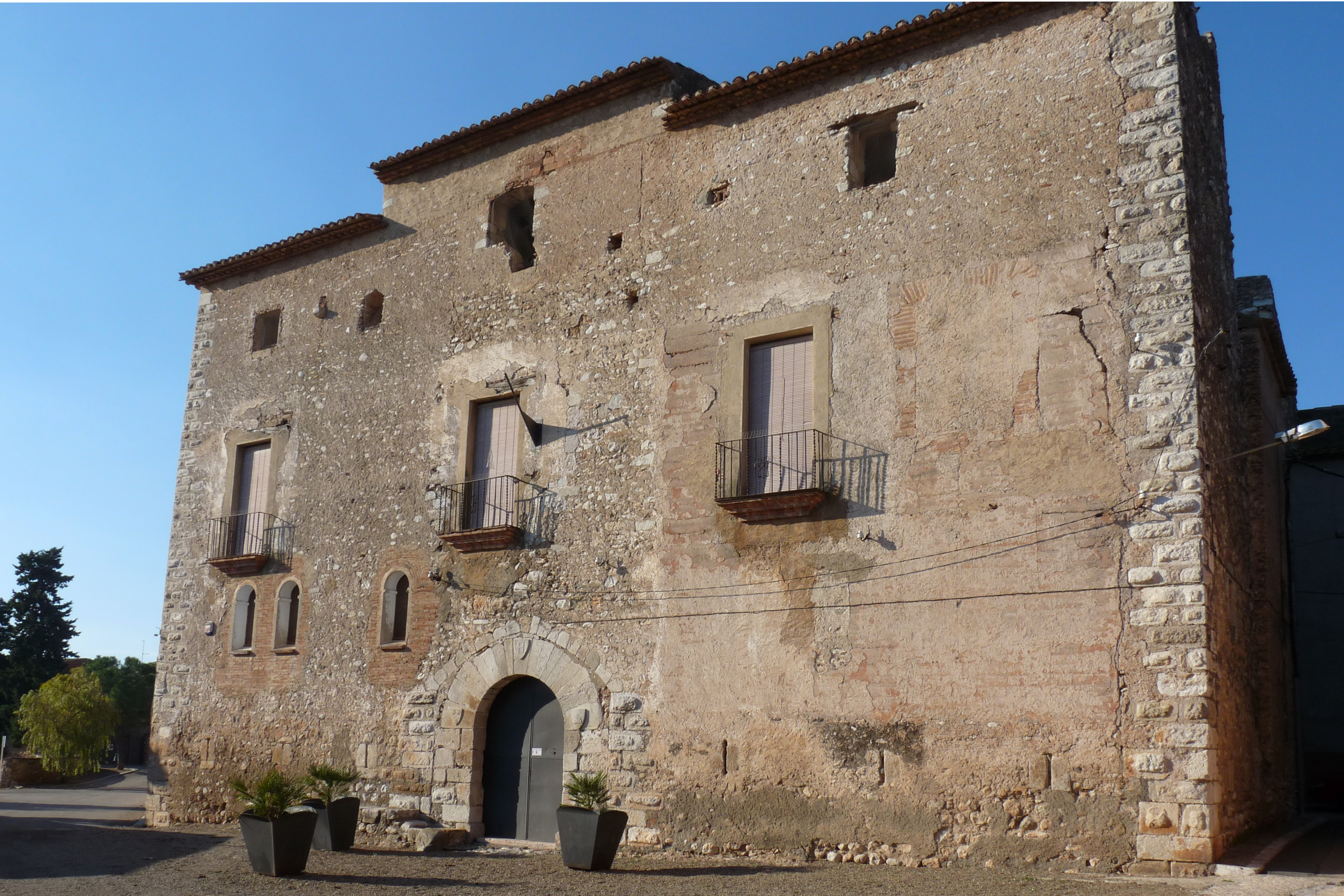
- House of the Marquesos de Vallgornera

- Flag Coat of arms

- Location in Catalonia
- Coordinates: 41.2253°N 1.2189°E
- Country: Spain
- Community: Catalonia
- Province: Tarragona
- Comarca: Alt Camp

Government
  - Mayor: Maria del Carme Basora Ventura (2015)

Area
  - Total: 2.3 km^{2} (0.89 sq mi)

Population (2025-01-01)
  - Total: 385
  - Density: 170/km^{2} (430/sq mi)
- Website: www.rourell.altanet.org

El Rourell (Catalan pronunciation: [əl ˌrowˈɾeʎ]) is a municipality situated in the comarca of Tarragona, Catalonia, Spain. The name "El Rourell" is derived from the Rourell oak tree, which is prominently featured in the municipality's coat of arms. It has a population of 385 (register office, 2025).

Originally part of the larger estate of Quince, El Rourell came under the ownership of the Molnells family between 1150 and 1158, through a grant by Ramon Berenguer IV and Archbishop Bernard of Tort. Berenguer Molnells later joined the Order of the Templars, whose influence in El Rourell was significant. This led to the establishment of the Order of Rourell, which operated under the authority of the Barony of Barberà. After the Templars were disbanded, the lands of El Rourell passed to the Bishopric of Tarragona. Subsequently, rights over El Rourell were held by the Plegamans and the Marquis of Vallgornera, who were major landowners in the region. Even until recent years, El Rourell retained notable aspects of its feudal past.
