= Querol =

- Municipality
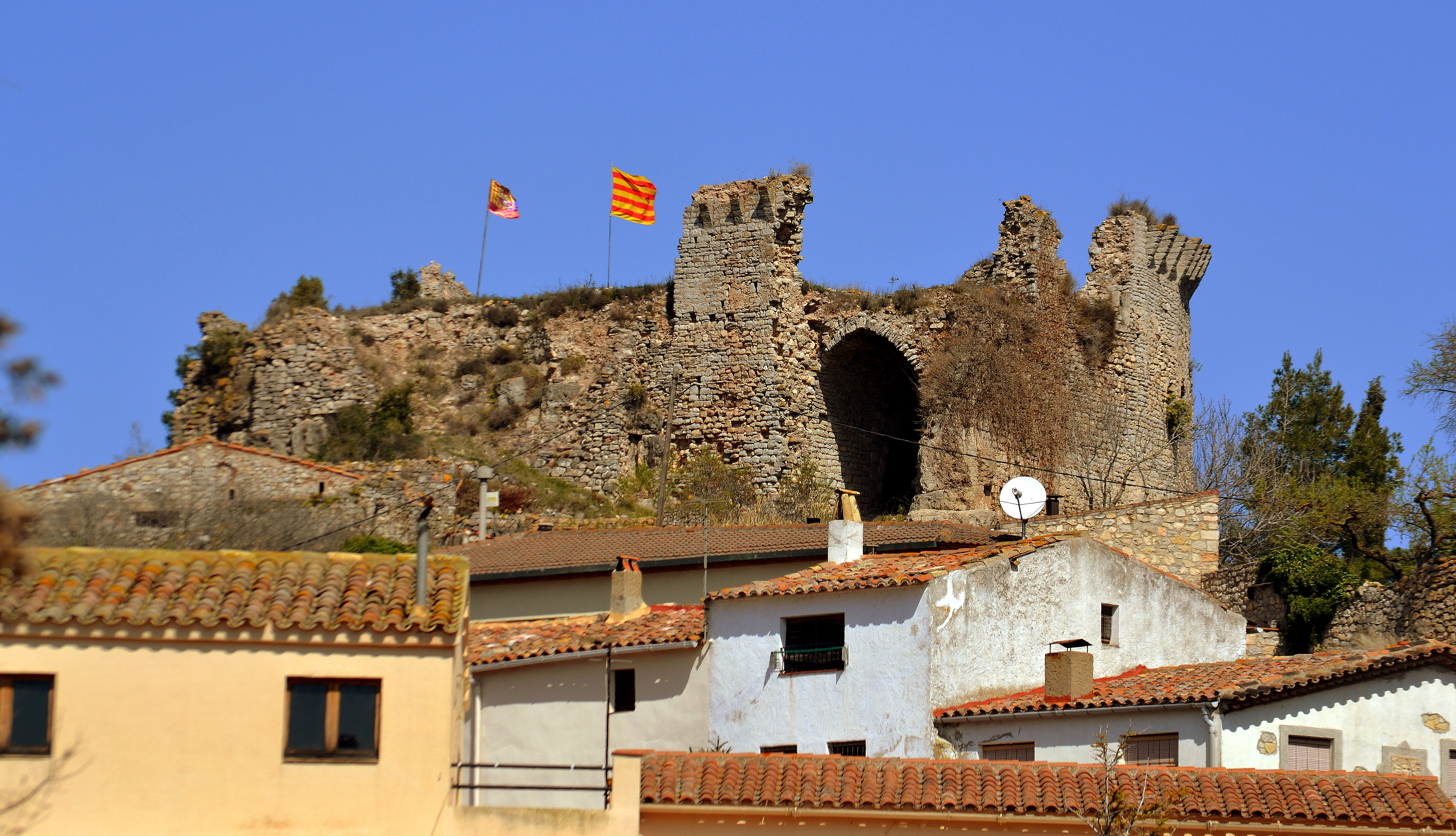
- Querol castle

- Coat of arms

- Location in Catalonia
- Coordinates: 41.426°N 1.399°E
- Country: Spain
- Community: Catalonia
- Province: Tarragona
- Comarca: Alt Camp

Government
  - Mayor: Miguel Uroz Mendioroz (2015)

Area
  - Total: 72.3 km^{2} (27.9 sq mi)
- Elevation: 565 m (1,854 ft)

Population (2025-01-01)
  - Total: 611
  - Density: 8.45/km^{2} (21.9/sq mi)
- Website: querol.cat

Querol (Catalan pronunciation: [kəˈɾɔl]) is a municipality in the comarca of Alt Camp, Tarragona, Catalonia, Spain.

It is situated in the north-eastern section of the region. It has an altitude of 565 m. It has a population of 611 (register office, 2025). With an area of 71.88 km^{2}. This works out to a population density of 7.776850 people/km2. The municipal budget for 2008 was €1,566,000.
