= La Masó =

- Municipality
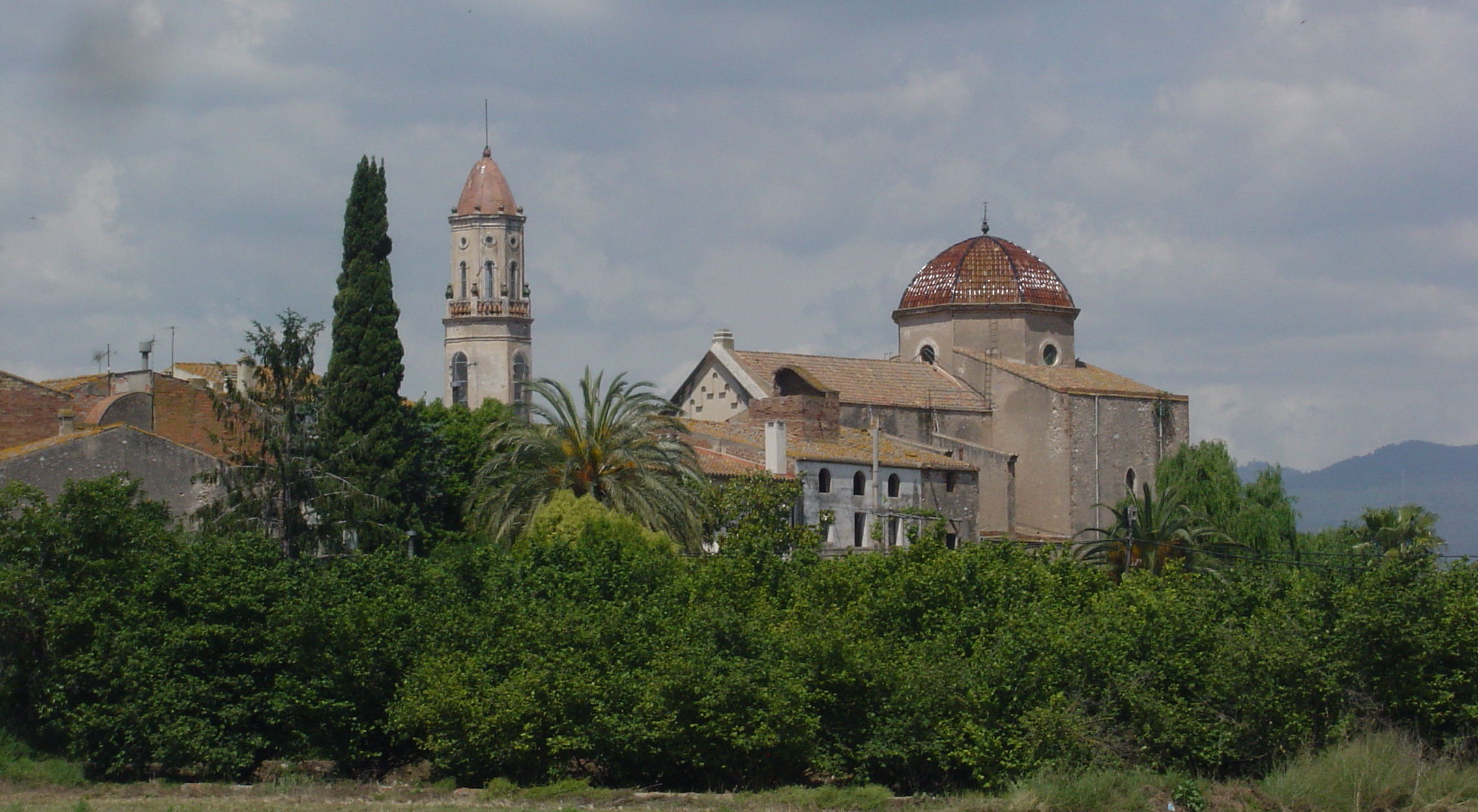
- [La Masó]

- Flag Coat of arms

- Location in Spain La Masó (Spain)
- Coordinates: 41°14′12″N 1°13′26″E
- Country: Spain
- Autonomous community: Catalonia
- Province: Tarragona
- Comarca: Alt Camp

Government
  - Mayor: Albert Camps (2023)

Area
  - Total: 3.6 km^{2} (1.4 sq mi)
- Elevation: 115 m (377 ft)

Population (2025-01-01)
  - Total: 307
  - Density: 85/km^{2} (220/sq mi)
- Demonym: Masonenc
- Website: www.maso.altanet.org

La Masó (Catalan pronunciation: [lə məˈzo]) is a municipality in the comarca of Alt Camp, province of Tarragona, Catalonia, Spain. It has a population of 307 (register office, 2025).

Activities include an oil refinery.
