= La Riba =

- Municipality
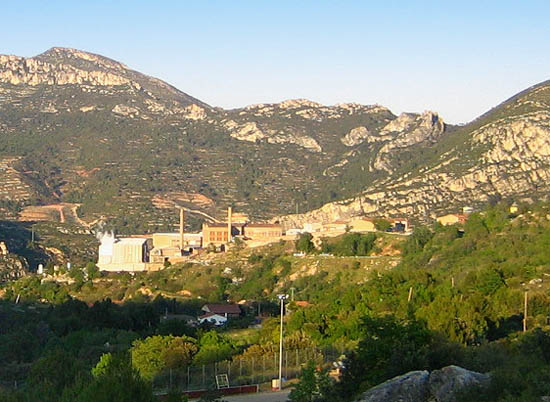

- Coat of arms

- Location within Catalonia
- Coordinates: 41°19′11″N 1°10′44″E
- Country: Spain
- Autonomous community: Catalonia
- Province: Tarragona
- Comarca: Alt Camp

Government
  - Mayor: Joan de Lapuente Lladó (2015)

Area
  - Total: 8.0 km^{2} (3.1 sq mi)
- Elevation: 263 m (863 ft)

Population (2025-01-01)
  - Total: 574
  - Density: 72/km^{2} (190/sq mi)
- Demonym: Ribetà
- Postal code: 43450
- Website: www.riba.altanet.org

La Riba (Catalan pronunciation: [lə ˈriβɛ]) is a municipality in the comarca of Alt Camp, Tarragona, Catalonia, in north-eastern Spain. It has a population of 574 (register office, 2025).

The Prades Mountains are located near this municipality. From this foundation in the 12th century, the population has several water mills, for making flour and paper. The paper industry is still the primary economic activity.
