= El Milà =

- Municipality
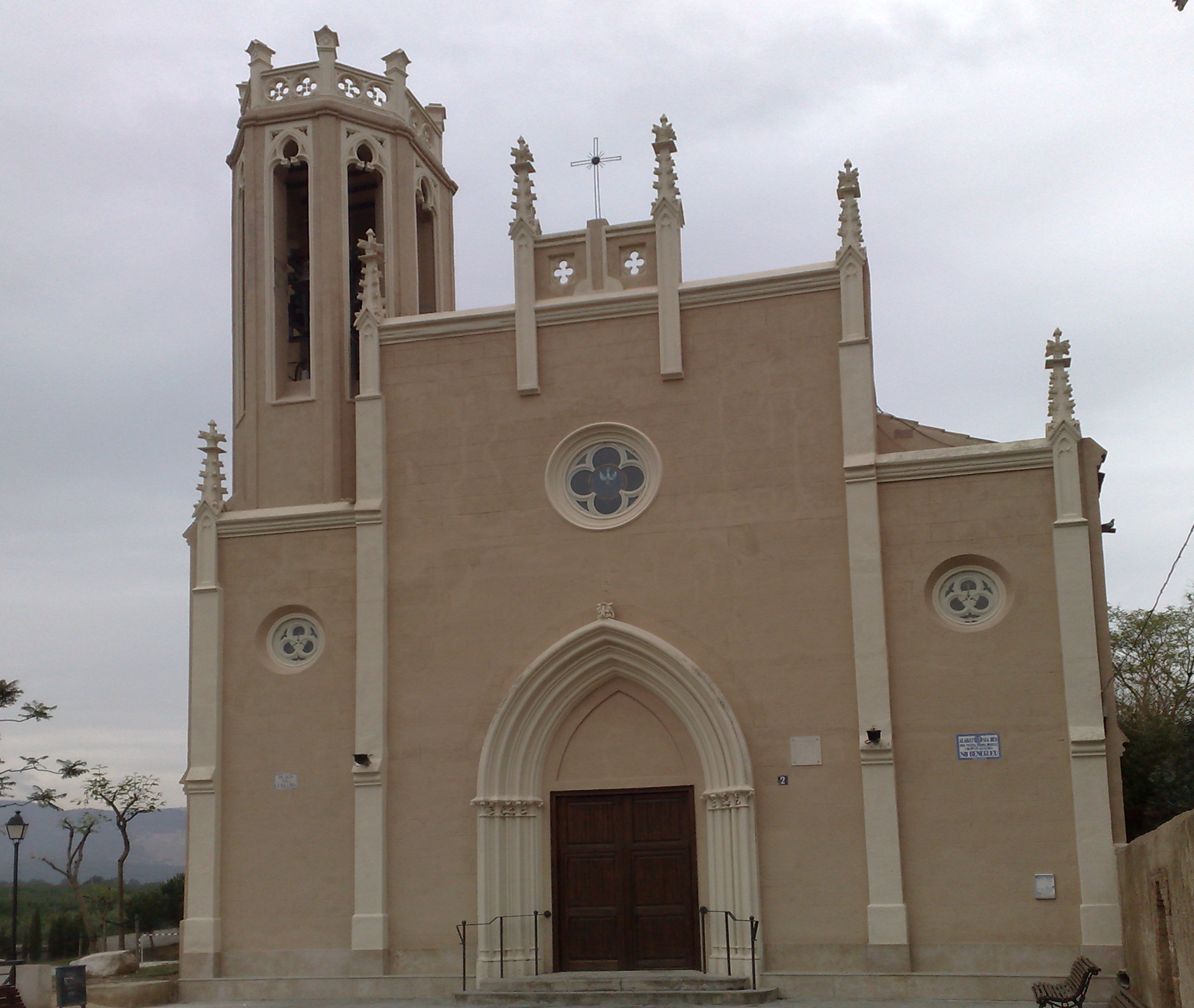
- Santes Creus Monastery

- Coat of arms

- Location in Spain El Milà (Spain)
- Coordinates: 41°15′0″N 1°12′31″E
- Country: Spain
- Autonomous community: Catalonia
- Province: Tarragona
- Comarca: Alt Camp

Government
  - Mayor: Antoni Palau Bosch (2015)

Area
  - Total: 4.1 km^{2} (1.6 sq mi)
- Elevation: 166 m (545 ft)

Population (2025-01-01)
  - Total: 194
  - Density: 47/km^{2} (120/sq mi)
- Demonym: Milanenc
- Website: www.mila.altanet.org

El Milà (Catalan pronunciation: [əl miˈla]) is a municipality in the comarca of Alt Camp, Tarragona, Catalonia, Spain.

It has a population of 194 (register office, 2025).
