= Aiguamúrcia =

- Municipality
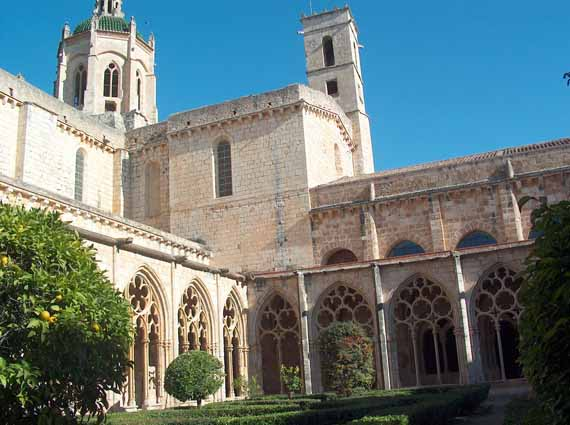
- Santes Creus Monastery

- Coat of arms

- Location in Spain Aiguamúrcia (Spain)
- Coordinates: 41.329°N 1.359°E
- Country: Spain
- Autonomous community: Catalonia
- Province: Tarragona
- Comarca: Alt Camp

Government
  - Mayor: Josefina Bartolí Parera (2015)

Area
  - Total: 73.20 km^{2} (28.26 sq mi)
- Elevation: 314 m (1,030 ft)

Population (2025-01-01)
  - Total: 987
  - Density: 13.5/km^{2} (34.9/sq mi)
- Demonym: Aiguamurcienc
- Postal code: 43815
- Website: aiguamurcia.cat

Aiguamúrcia (Catalan pronunciation: [ˌajɣwəˈmuɾsi.ə]) is a municipality, located in the province of Tarragona, Catalonia (northern Spain), in the Alt Camp comarca.

It has a population of 987 (register office, 2025).

The Monastery of Santes Creus is located within the commune's territory.
