= Nulles =

- Municipality
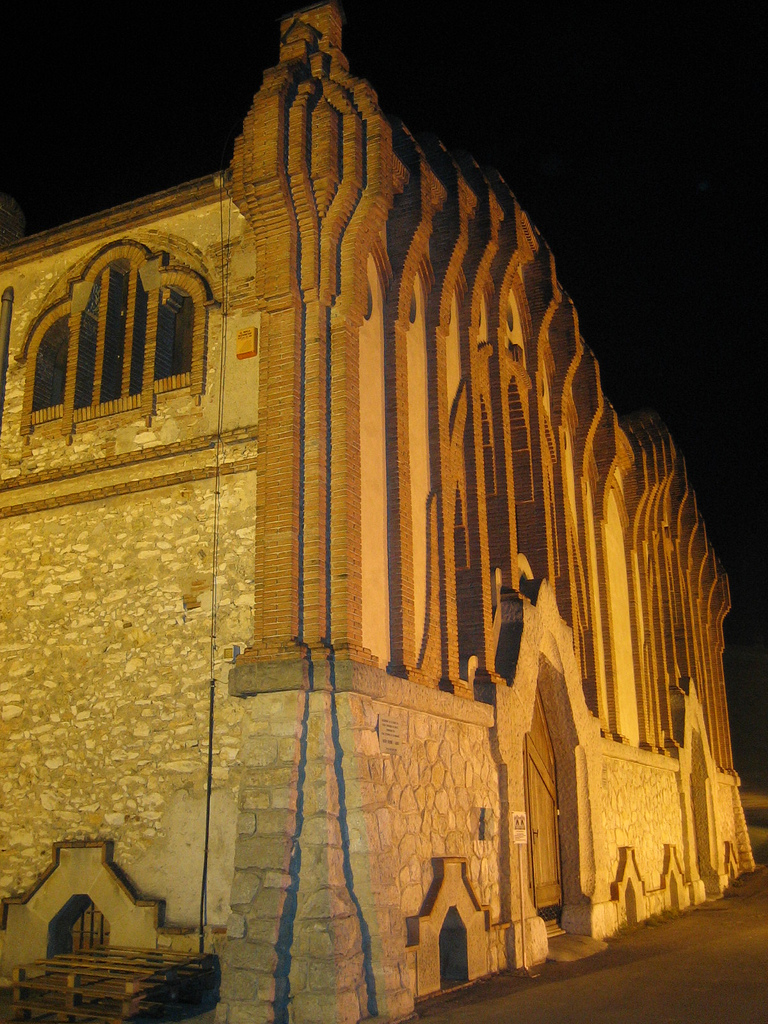
- Winery in Nulles

- Coat of arms

- Location in Spain Nulles (Spain)
- Coordinates: 41°15′4″N 1°17′48″E
- Country: Spain
- Autonomous community: Catalonia
- Province: Tarragona
- Comarca: Alt Camp

Government
  - Mayor: Francesc Xavier Domingo Segú (2015)

Area
  - Total: 10.6 km^{2} (4.1 sq mi)
- Elevation: 231 m (758 ft)

Population (2025-01-01)
  - Total: 551
  - Density: 52.0/km^{2} (135/sq mi)
- Demonym: Nullenc
- Postal code: 43887
- Website: www.nulles.altanet.org

Nulles (Catalan pronunciation: [ˈnuʎəs]) is a municipality in the comarca of Alt Camp, Tarragona, Catalonia, Spain. It has a population of 551 (register office, 2025).

The old winery of Nulles, built in 1917, and known in Catalonia as one of the "Wine Cathedrals", was built in Modernisme and Noucentisme style and designed by architect Cèsar Martinell.
