= Rodonyà =

- Municipality
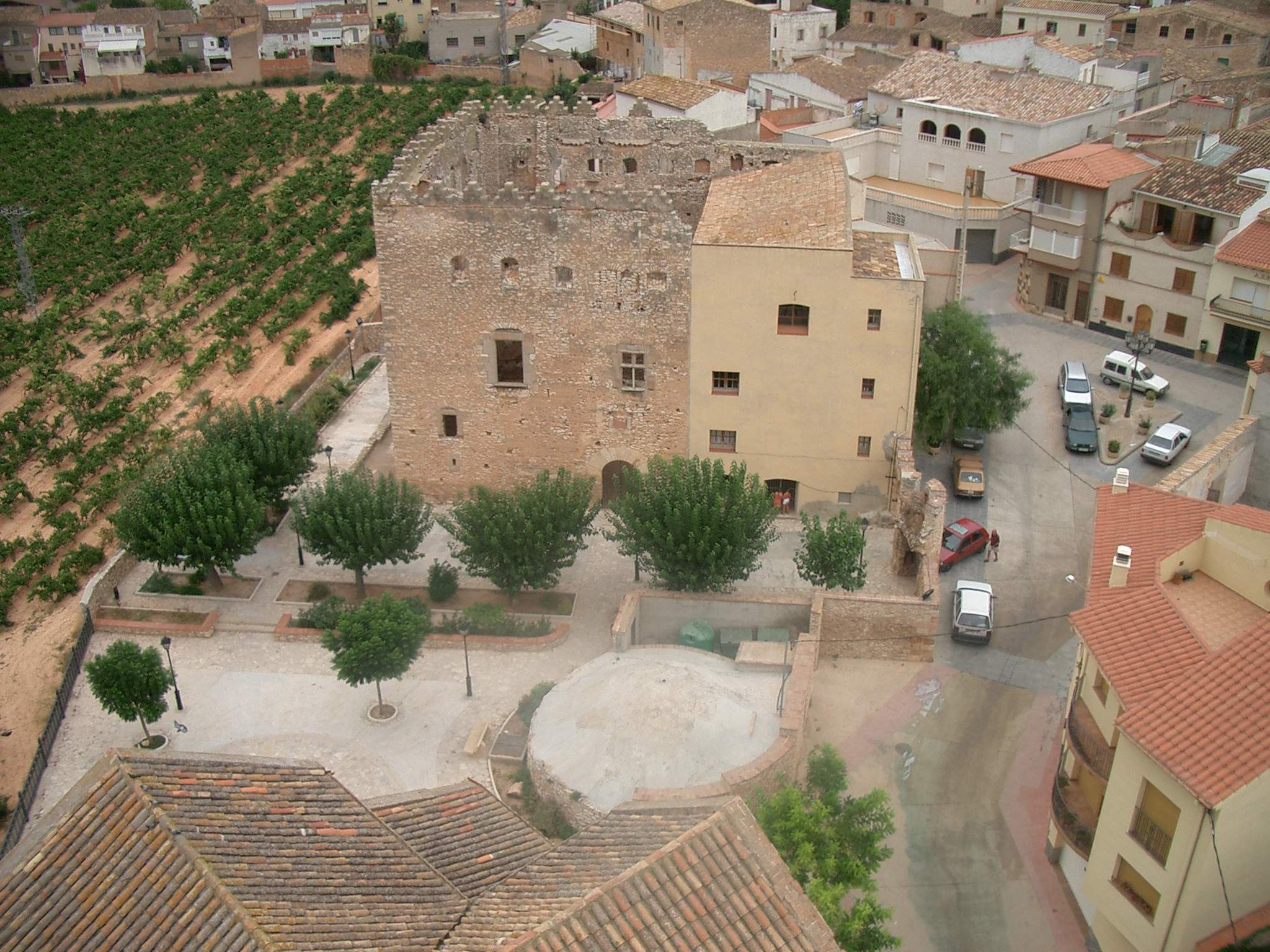
- Rodonyà castle

- Coat of arms

- Location in Spain Rodonyà (Spain)
- Coordinates: 41°16′57″N 1°23′55″E
- Country: Spain
- Autonomous community: Catalonia
- Province: Tarragona
- Comarca: Alt Camp

Government
  - Mayor: Enric Ferré Guinovart (2015)

Area
  - Total: 8.5 km^{2} (3.3 sq mi)
- Elevation: 312 m (1,024 ft)

Population (2025-01-01)
  - Total: 519
  - Density: 61/km^{2} (160/sq mi)
- Demonym: Rodonyenc
- Website: www.rodonya.altanet.org

Rodonyà (Catalan pronunciation: [ruðuˈɲa]) is a municipality in the comarca of Alt Camp, province of Tarragona, Catalonia, Spain. It has a population of 519 (register office, 2025).
