= Vila-rodona =

- Municipality
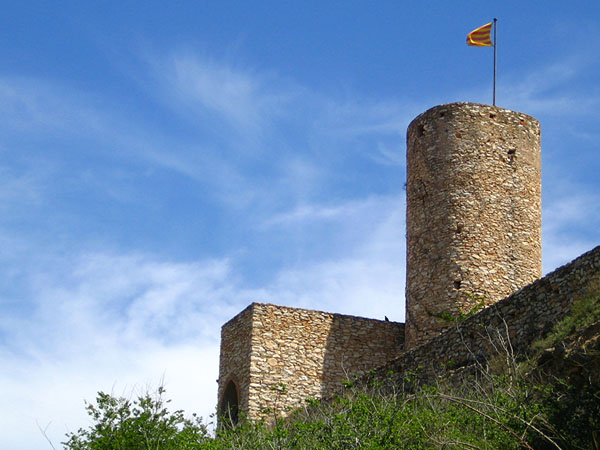

- Coat of arms

- Location in Spain Vila-rodona (Spain)
- Coordinates: 41°18′46″N 1°21′34″E
- Country: Spain
- Autonomous community: Catalonia
- Province: Tarragona
- Comarca: Alt Camp

Government
  - Mayor: Ramon Maria Bricolle Montragull (2015)

Area
  - Total: 33.1 km^{2} (12.8 sq mi)
- Elevation: 260 m (850 ft)

Population (2025-01-01)
  - Total: 1,382
  - Density: 41.8/km^{2} (108/sq mi)
- Website: www.vila-rodona.altanet.org

Vila-rodona (Catalan pronunciation: [ˌviləruˈðonə], Spanish: Villarrodona) is a municipality in the comarca of Alt Camp, Tarragona, Catalonia, Spain. It has a population of 1,382 (register office, 2025).
