= Alt Camp =

Coordinates: 41°17′N 1°15′E

- Comarca
- Country: Spain
- Autonomous community: Catalonia
- Region: Camp de Tarragona
- Province: Tarragona
- Capital: Valls
- Municipalities: List: Aiguamúrcia, Alcover, Alió, Bràfim, Cabra del Camp, Figuerola del Camp, Els Garidells, La Masó, El Milà, Mont-ral, Montferri, Nulles, El Pla de Santa Maria, El Pont d'Armentera, Puigpelat, Querol, La Riba, Rodonyà, El Rourell, Vallmoll, Valls, Vila-rodona, Vilabella

Government
  - Body: Alt Camp Comarcal Council
  - President: Mateu Montserrat (Junts)

Area
  - Total: 538.2 km^{2} (207.8 sq mi)

Population (2024)
  - Total: 46,076
  - Density: 85.61/km^{2} (221.7/sq mi)
- Time zone: UTC+1 (CET)
  - Summer (DST): UTC+2 (CEST)
- Largest municipality: Valls
- Website: http://www.altcamp.cat/

Alt Camp (Catalan pronunciation: [ˈal ˈkam]) is a comarca (county) located in the region of Camp de Tarragona, in Catalonia, Spain. The capital is the city of Valls.

== Geography ==
To the north of the county lies Conca de Barberà, to the northeast lies Anoia, to the east and southeast lie Alt Penedès and Baix Penedès, to the south lies Tarragonès and to the southwest and west lies Baix Camp. Alt Camp has an area of 544.69 square kilometres (210.31 sq mi) and the capital of the county is Valls.

The county is divided into two main topographical areas. The northeastern part is mountainous and is in the Catalan Pre-Coastal Range while the southwestern part is a lowland plain in the Catalan Coastal Depression. The lowland plains of Alt Camp are predominantly used for agriculture. In the valley of the River Gaia, cherries, vines, olives and almonds are grown, and on irrigated land, vegetables, hazelnuts and various fruit trees. The municipality of Bràfim in this valley has a small industrial area. The mountain slopes are covered in maquis, an evergreen Mediterranean scrub with bushes and small trees, including many aromatic shrubs. The olives and grapevines that used to grow on terraces there have been abandoned. Among the scrub there are patches of poplar, elm, white pine, Portuguese oak and holm oak. Frequent wildfires prevent the establishment of permanent forests.

== Municipalities ==
In 2014, 44,578 people lived in the county: 24,570 of them lived in Valls; 5,131 in Alcover; 2,344 in El Pla de Santa Maria; 1,670 in Vallmoll; 1,264 in Vila-rodona; 1,115 in Cabra del Camp and 1,083 in Puigpelat. The remaining 8,401 inhabitants lived in municipalities with fewer than 1,000 inhabitants.

Municipality	Population (2014)	Area km^{2}
Aiguamúrcia	909	73.0
Alcover	5,131	46.0
Alió	432	7.2
Bràfim	660	6.4
Cabra del Camp	1,115	27.0
Figuerola del Camp	345	22.7
Els Garidells	182	3.1
La Masó	288	3.6
El Milà	174	4.1
Mont-ral	165	34.7
Montferri	369	19.2
Nulles	453	10.6
El Pla de Santa Maria	2,344	35.0
El Pont d'Armentera	561	21.7
Puigpelat	1,083	9.5
Querol	550	72.3
La Riba	601	8.0
Rodonyà	513	8.5
El Rourell	394	2.3
Vallmoll	1,670	16.7
Valls	24,570	55.3
Vila-rodona	1,264	33.1
Vilabella	805	18.2
• Total: 23	44,578	538.2

== Comarcal council ==
Councilors in County Council of Alt Camp since 1987
Key to parties CUP ERC FIC AAEAC ApC PSC JxCat Junts CiU
Election	Distribution	President
1987	5 / 14	Josep Vilanova Puigbó (CiU)
1991	1 / 2 / 4 / 12	Josep Fort Romeu (CiU)
1995	1 / 1 / 5 / 12	Josep Fort Romeu (CiU) (1995-1997)
1995	1 / 1 / 5 / 12	Carles Vidal Bové (CiU) (1997-1999)
1999	3 / 2 / 4 / 10	Josep Jesús Escoda Anguera (CiU)
2003	2 / 7 / 1 / 9	Josep Jesús Escoda Anguera (CiU)
2007	2 / 7 / 10	Carme Mansilla (CiU)
2011	1 / 1 / 5 / 12	Joan Josep Raventós (CiU)
2015	2 / 3 / 1 / 3 / 10	Joan Maria Sanahuja (CiU)
2019	2 / 5 / 1 / 2 / 9	Joan Maria Sanahuja (JxCat) (2019-2020)
2019	2 / 5 / 1 / 2 / 9	Mateu Montserrat (Junts) (2020-2023)
2023	1 / 5 / 2 / 3 / 8	Mateu Montserrat (Junts)
