= Puigpelat =

- Municipality
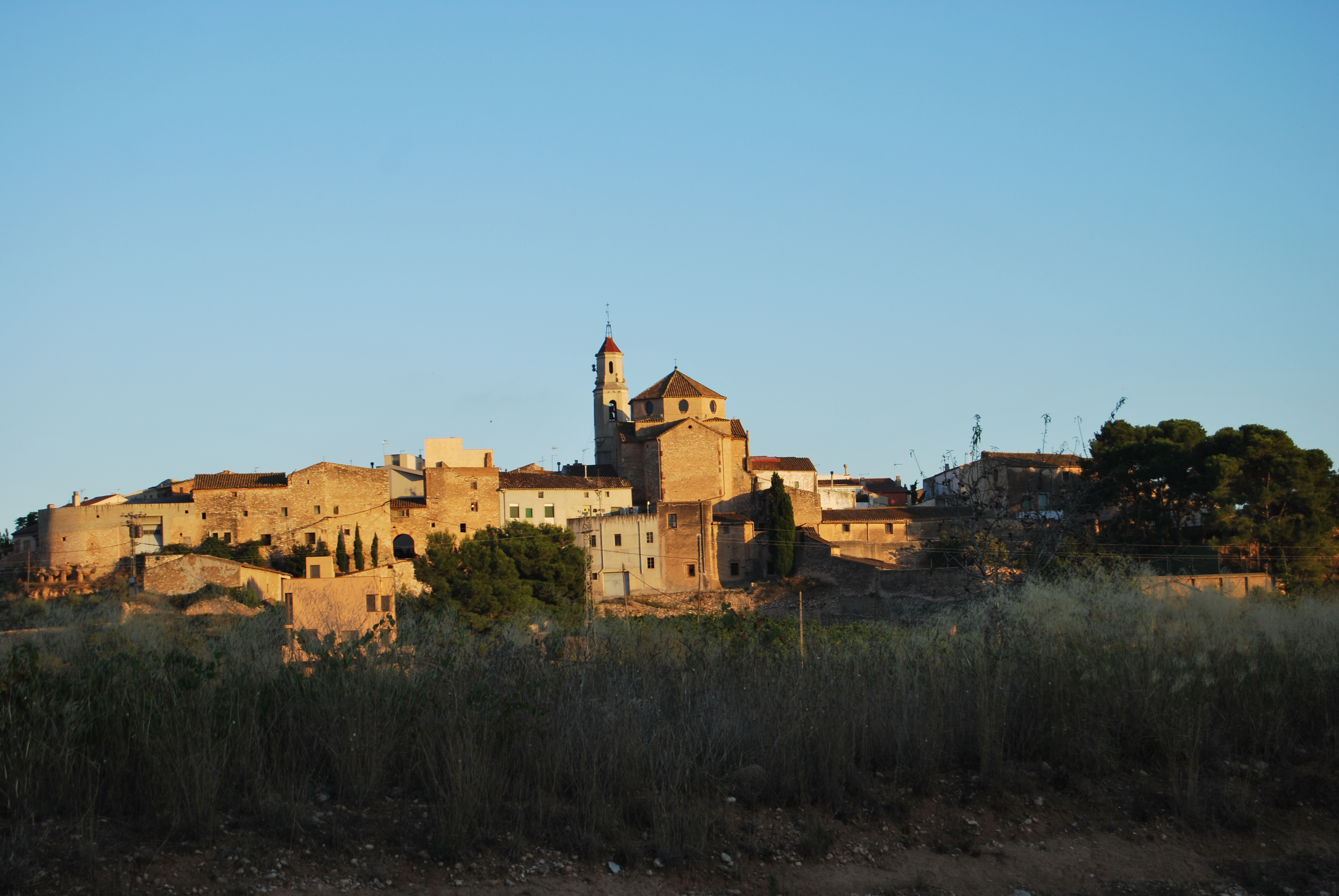
- Puigpelat

- Flag Coat of arms

- Location in Spain Puigpelat (Spain)
- Coordinates: 41°16′50″N 1°17′55″E
- Country: Spain
- Autonomous community: Catalonia
- Province: Tarragona
- Comarca: Alt Camp

Government
  - Mayor: Marta Blanch Figueras (2015)

Area
  - Total: 9.5 km^{2} (3.7 sq mi)
- Elevation: 252 m (827 ft)

Population (2025-01-01)
  - Total: 1,222
  - Density: 130/km^{2} (330/sq mi)
- Demonym: Puigpelatenc
- Postal code: 43812
- Website: puigpelat.cat

Puigpelat (Catalan pronunciation: [putʃpəˈlat]) is a municipality in the comarca of Alt Camp, province of Tarragona, Catalonia, Spain.

It has a population of 1,222 (register office, 2025).
