= UE Valls =

Association football club in Spain

Valls
- Full name: Unió Esportiva Valls
- Founded: 1980
- Ground: Camp del Vilar, Valls, Catalonia, Spain
- Capacity: 2,500
- Chairman: Francesc Martí
- Manager: Joan Pallarès
- League: Lliga Elit
- 2025–26: Lliga Elit, 11th of 16
Home colours

Unió Esportiva Valls is a Catalan football team based in Valls, in Tarragona province. Founded in 1980, it plays in Lliga Elit, holding home matches at Camp del Vilar, which has a capacity of 2,500 spectators.

== History ==
The first football clubs in the history of Valls were Club Sporting Hispània FC, Valls FC, Germans Sant Gabriel and Regiment de Cavalleria, that defunct in the 1920s.

In 1922 Valls Deportiu and Atlètic Vallenc (in the 1930s Penya Sempre Avant) were founded. Until 1969, there was no football team in Valls. That year, the football section of CB Valls was founded, which became independent in 1972.

Unió Esportiva Valls was born in 1980 with the union of Valls CF and CF Quatre Barres.

=== Club background ===
Valls Club de Futbol - (1973–1980) → ↓

Unió Esportiva Valls - (1980–present)

Club de Futbol Quatre Barres - (1972–1980) → ↑

==== Club names ====
- Unió Esportiva Valls-Quatre Barres (1980–1984)
- Unió Esportiva Valls (1984–present)

== Season to season ==
Season	Tier	Division	Place	Copa del Rey
1980–81	6	1ª Reg.	19th	
1981–82	7	2ª Reg.	7th	
1982–83	7	2ª Reg.	14th	
1983–84	7	2ª Reg.	6th	
1984–85	6	1ª Reg.	14th	
1985–86	6	1ª Reg.	2nd	
1986–87	6	1ª Reg.	8th	
1987–88	6	1ª Reg.	2nd	
1988–89	6	1ª Reg.	6th	
1989–90	6	1ª Reg.	1st	
1990–91	5	Reg. Pref.	17th	
1991–92	6	Pref. Terr.	13th	
1992–93	6	Pref. Terr.	11th	
1993–94	6	Pref. Terr.	12th	
1994–95	6	Pref. Terr.	6th	
1995–96	6	Pref. Terr.	7th	
1996–97	6	Pref. Terr.	1st	
1997–98	5	1ª Cat.	12th	
1998–99	5	1ª Cat.	14th	
1999–2000	5	1ª Cat.	16th	

Season	Tier	Division	Place	Copa del Rey
2000–01	5	1ª Cat.	11th	
2001–02	5	1ª Cat.	20th	
2002–03	6	Pref. Terr.	14th	
2003–04	7	1ª Terr.	10th	
2004–05	7	1ª Terr.	4th	
2005–06	7	1ª Terr.	13th	
2006–07	7	1ª Terr.	16th	
2007–08	8	2ª Terr.	2nd	
2008–09	8	2ª Terr.	1st	
2009–10	7	1ª Terr.	4th	
2010–11	7	1ª Terr.	1st	
2011–12	5	1ª Cat.	14th	
2012–13	5	1ª Cat.	17th	
2013–14	6	2ª Cat.	4th	
2014–15	6	2ª Cat.	9th	
2015–16	6	2ª Cat.	3rd	
2016–17	6	2ª Cat.	2nd	
2017–18	5	1ª Cat.	17th	
2018–19	6	2ª Cat.	1st	
2019–20	5	1ª Cat.	2nd	

Season	Tier	Division	Place	Copa del Rey
2020–21	4	3ª	9th / 7th	
2021–22	6	1ª Cat.	4th	
2022–23	6	1ª Cat.	2nd	
2023–24	6	Lliga Elit	7th	
2024–25	6	Lliga Elit	10th	
2025–26	6	Lliga Elit	11th	
2026–27	6	Lliga Elit		

- 1 season in Tercera División
