= Figuerola del Camp =

- Municipality
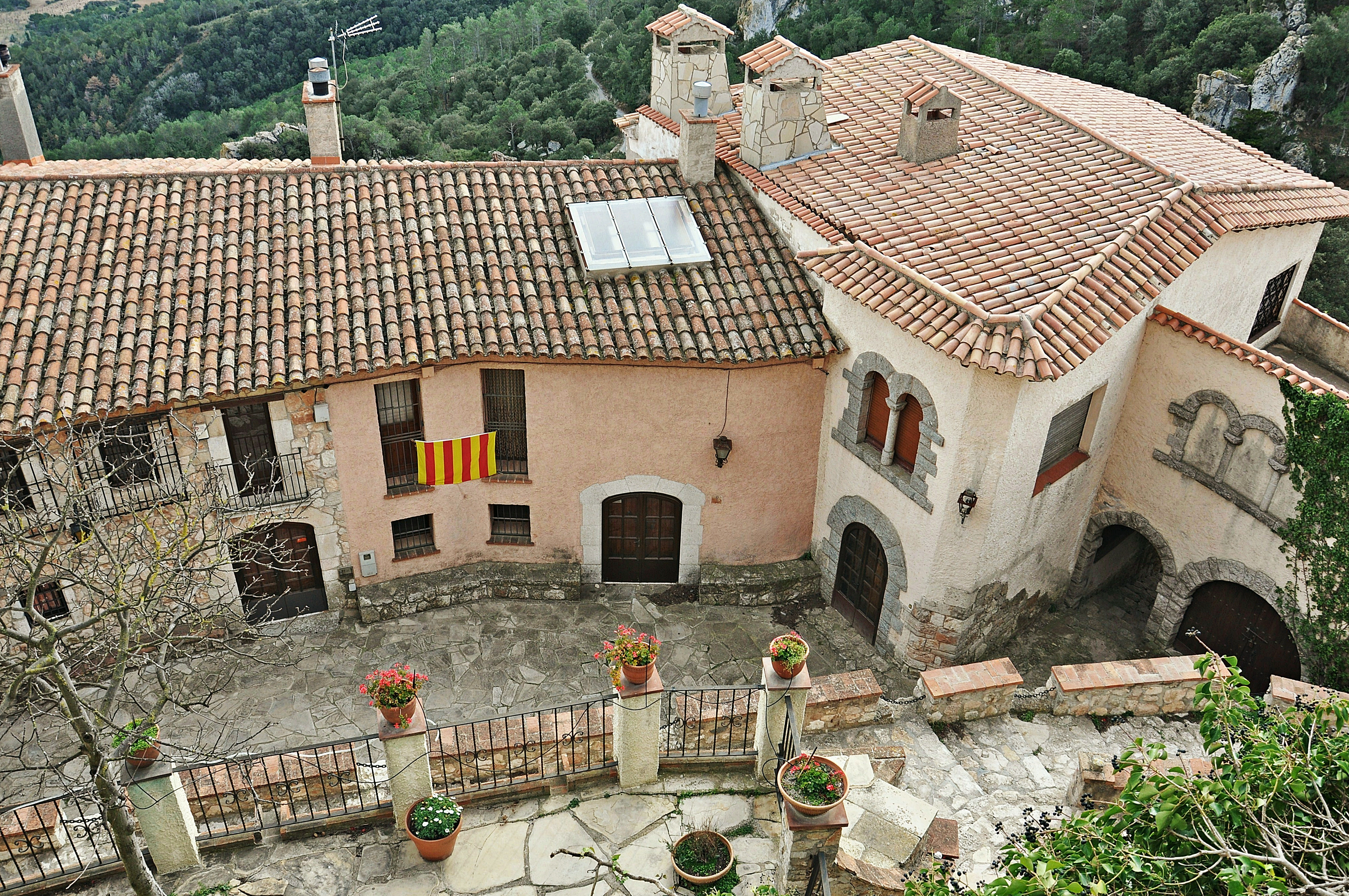
- Figuerola del Camp

- Flag Coat of arms

- Location in Spain Figuerola del Camp (Spain)
- Coordinates: 41°22′26″N 1°15′59″E
- Country: Spain
- Autonomous community: Catalonia
- Province: Tarragona
- Comarca: Alt Camp

Government
  - Mayor: Josep Sans Ferre (2015)

Area
  - Total: 22.7 km^{2} (8.8 sq mi)
- Elevation: 474 m (1,555 ft)

Population (2025-01-01)
  - Total: 342
  - Density: 15.1/km^{2} (39.0/sq mi)
- Demonym: Figuerolenc
- Postal code: 43811
- Website: www.figuerola.altanet.org

Figuerola del Camp (Catalan pronunciation: [fiɣəˈɾɔlə ðəl ˈkam]) is a municipality in the comarca of Alt Camp, province of Tarragona, Catalonia, Spain.

It has a population of 342 (register office, 2025).
