= Cabra del Camp =

- Municipality
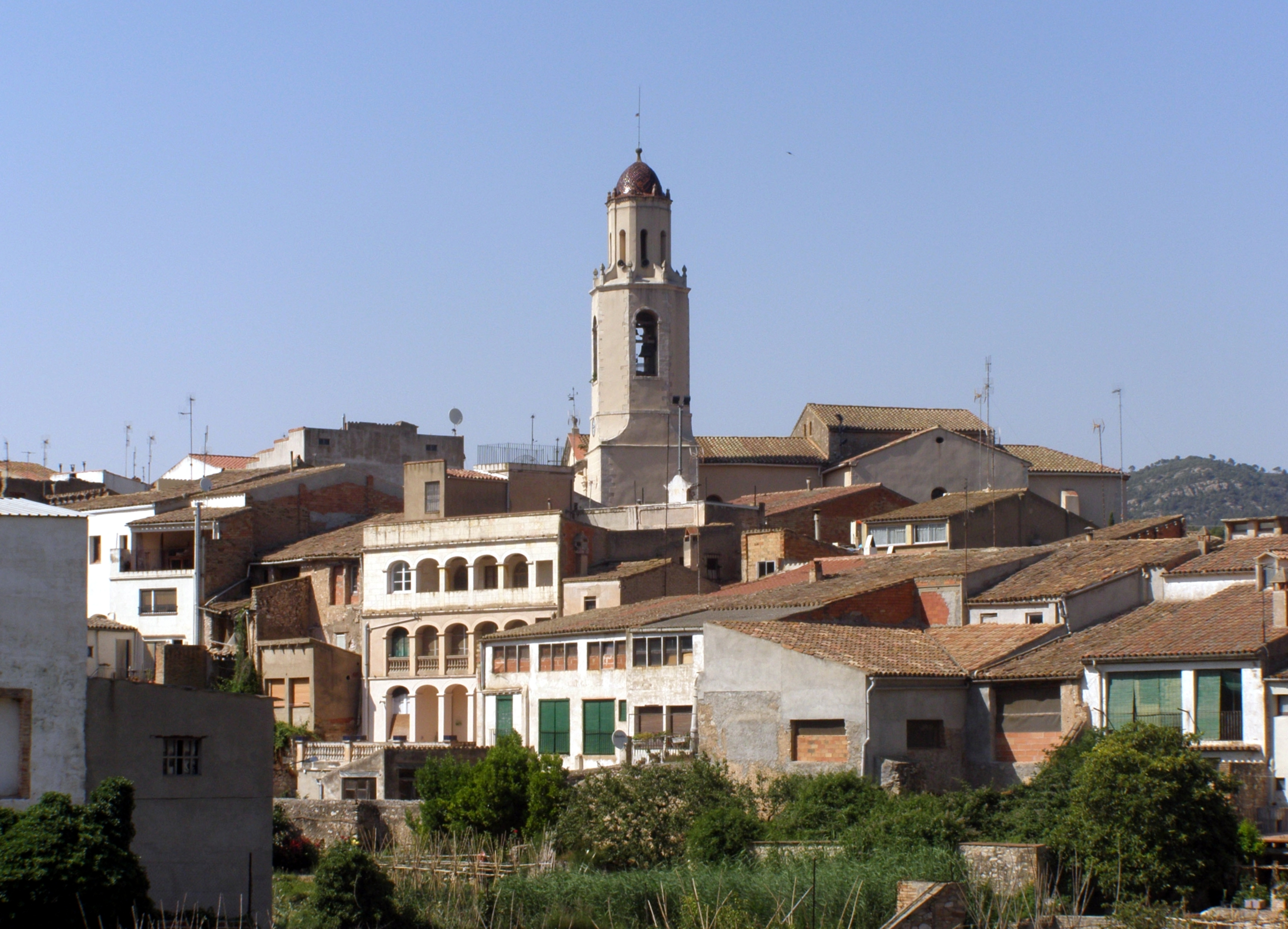
- Santa Maria Church

- Location in Spain Cabra del Camp (Spain)
- Coordinates: 41°23′50″N 1°16′40″E
- Country: Spain
- Autonomous community: Catalonia
- Province: Tarragona
- Comarca: Alt Camp

Government
  - Mayor: Miguel Castañon Figueras (2015)

Area
  - Total: 27.03 km^{2} (10.44 sq mi)
- Elevation: 493 m (1,617 ft)

Population (2025-01-01)
  - Total: 1,388
  - Density: 51.35/km^{2} (133.0/sq mi)
- Demonym: Cabrenc
- Postal code: 43811
- Website: www.cabra.oasi.org

Cabra del Camp (Catalan pronunciation: [ˈkaβɾɛ ðəl ˈkam]) is a municipality in the comarca of Alt Camp, Tarragona, Catalonia, Spain.

It has a population of 1,388 (register office, 2025).
