= Valls =

- Municipality
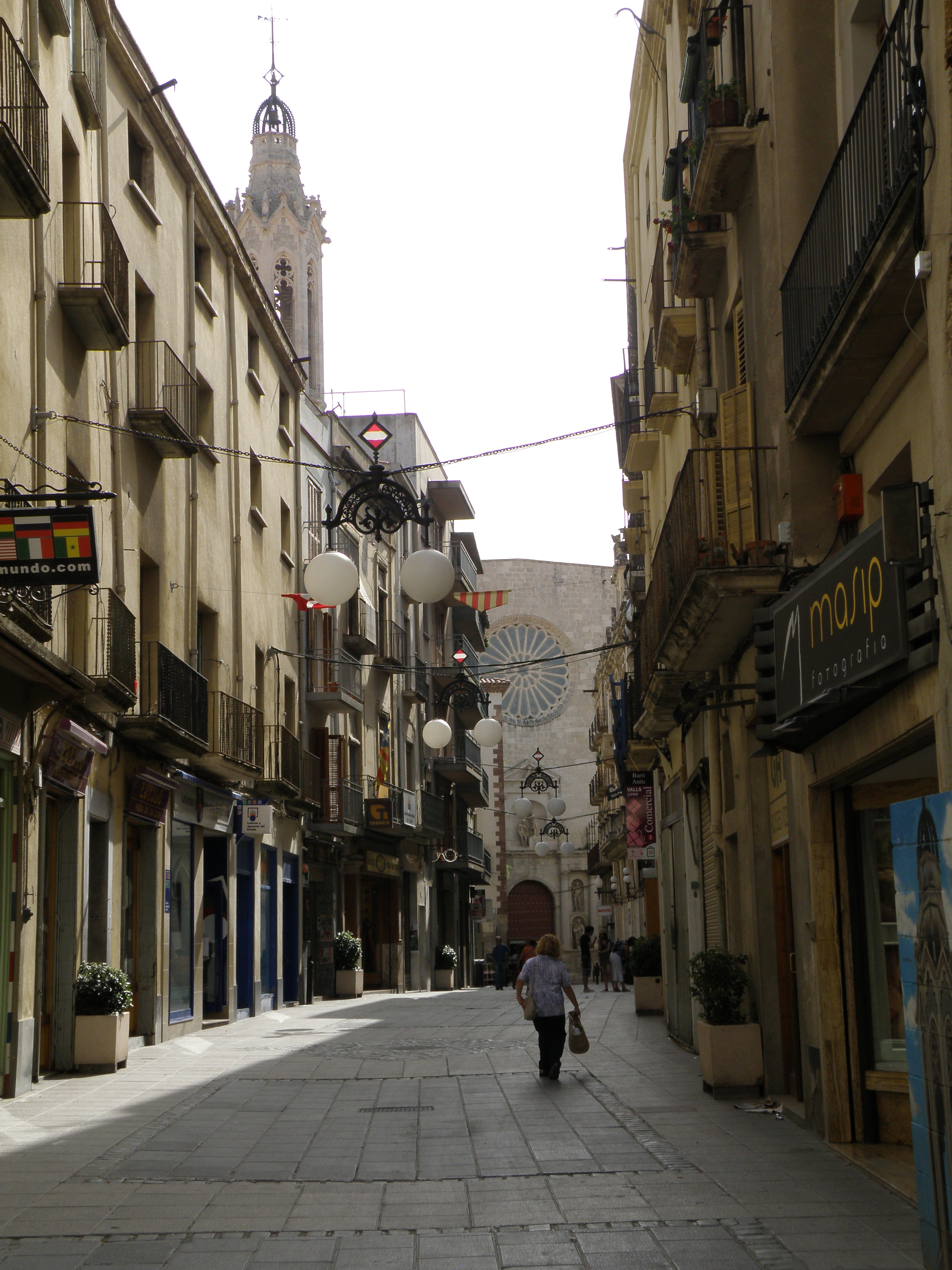

- Coat of arms

- Location within Catalonia Location within Spain
- Coordinates: 41°17′18″N 1°15′7″E
- Sovereign state: Spain
- Community: Catalonia
- Region: Camp de Tarragona
- County: Alt Camp
- Province: Tarragona

Government
  - Mayor: Dolors Farré i Cuadras (2019) (JxC)

Area
  - Total: 55.3 km^{2} (21.4 sq mi)
- Elevation: 215 m (705 ft)

Population (2025-01-01)
  - Total: 25,518
  - Density: 461/km^{2} (1,200/sq mi)
- Demonym(s): vallenc, -enca (pl. vallencs, -enques)
- Postal code: 43800
- Climate: Csa
- Website: valls.cat

Valls (Catalan pronunciation: [baʎs]) is a city and municipality in the Camp de Tarragona region in Catalonia, Spain. It is the capital of the comarca of Alt Camp. It has a population of 25,518 (register office, 2025).

Valls is known for its calçots – a type of scallion or green onion – and the human towers tradition known as the castells. The town is the birthplace of the composer Robert Gerhard (1896–1970). The Battle of Valls, during the Peninsular Wars, took place on 25 February 1809.

== Geography ==
Valls is the capital of the comarca of Alt Camp. With a population of 24,570 inhabitants in 2014, it represents more than half of the population of the county. It is located next to the River Francolí, near Reus (Baix Camp) and Tarragona (Tarragonès), the capital of the Spanish province.

== Culture ==
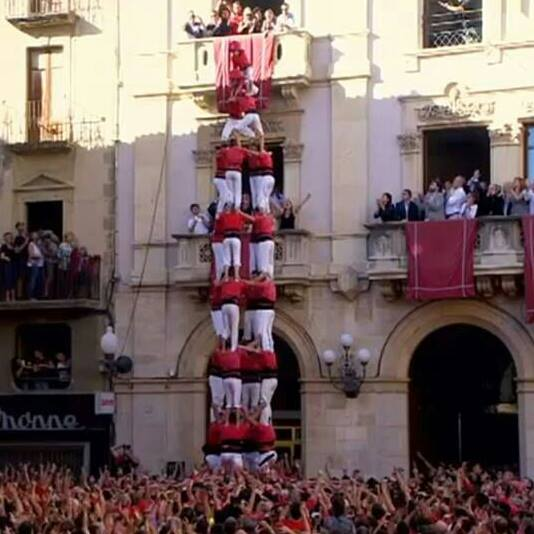
Colla Joves dels Xiquets de Valls

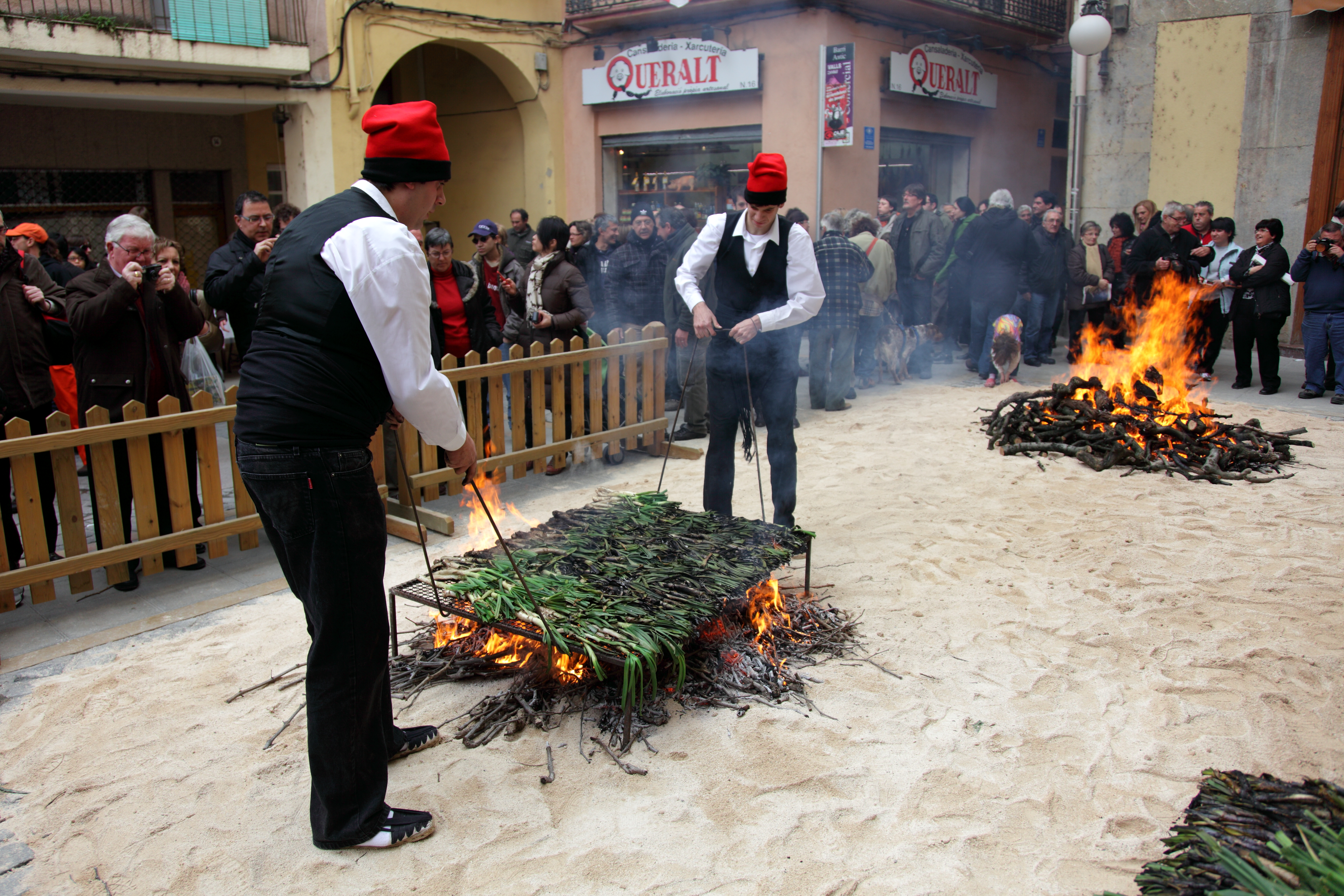
Calçotada

Valls is known for its culinary tradition, the feasting on calçots at what is known as a "calçotada". The calçots are a large type of sweet-flavoured spring onion, barbecued over a pit of flaming vines, and eaten piping hot with a sauce. The calçotada continues with a main course of meats and sausages grilled over the same glowing coals, and is washed down with locally produced wines. The calçots are only available between December and May and draw diners from as far away as Barcelona. The calçot is grown locally and has a "PGI" (Protected Geographical Indication) status in the same way that champagne does.

Another cultural tradition of Valls is the practice of building "castells" at festivals, towers of people sometimes as much as ten individuals high, with each layer being supported by the people below. This human tower tradition originated in the Ball dels Valencians in Valls, first recorded in 1712, and later spread to nearby towns such as Vilafranca del Penedès and Tarragona, and more recently, to other parts of Catalonia.

The composer Roberto Gerhard was born in Valls in 1896. He studied under Charles Koechlin in Paris and under Arnold Schoenberg in Vienna and Berlin before returning to Barcelona in 1928. During the Spanish Civil War he supported the Republican cause and was forced to flee the country in 1939, first to Paris and then to England where he spent the rest of his life, while his town was bombarded and a lot of Republican and Catholic citizens were killed. His works were virtually banned from performance in Spain under Francisco Franco. His output included symphonies, stage works, chamber music, choral music and electronic music.

In January 2017, Valls City Council announced the start of construction of a multimedia museum devoted to the culture of castells, called the Casteller Museum of Catalonia ("Museu Casteller de Catalunya"), marketed in English as "The Human Towers Experience". The project was initially launched in 2015, and is supported by the Catalan government.

== Sport ==
Football clubs Unió Esportiva Valls and Atlètic de Valls play in the town, as does CB Valls, a basketball club.

== Notable people ==
- Jaume Huguet (1412–1492), gotic painter
- Narcís Oller (1846–1930), novelist
- Maria Güell (1848–1921), venerable Roman Catholic religious sister
- Tomàs Caylà (1895–1936), publisher and carlist politician
- Robert Gerhard (1896–1970), composer
- Ignacio F. Iquino (1910–1994), film director, producer, actor, cinematographer
- Pedro Lazaga (1918–1979), film director and screenwriter
- Cèsar Puig (1956), lawyer and politician
- Xavier Tondo (1978–2011), cyclist
- Andrea Fuentes (1983), synchronised swimmer, four Olympic medals
- Aleix Vidal (1989), footballer

== Twin towns ==
- Andorra la Vella, Andorra
- Chahal, Guatemala
- Deqing, China
- Settimo Torinese, Italy

== Literature ==
- Panareda Clopés, Josep Maria; Rios Calvet, Jaume; Rabella Vives, Josep Maria (1989). Guia de Catalunya, Barcelona: Caixa de Catalunya. ISBN 84-87135-01-3 (Spanish). ISBN 84-87135-02-1 (Catalan).
