= Province of Tarragona =

Province of Spain

Province of Tarragona: Província de Tarragona (Catalan); Provincia de Tarragona (Spanish)
- Province
- Flag Coat of arms

- Location of the Province of Tarragona in Spain
- Coordinates: 41°10′N 1°00′E
- Country: Spain
- Autonomous community: Catalonia
- Capital: Tarragona
- Municipalities: 184

Government
  - Type: Diputación
  - Body: Provincial Deputation of Tarragona
  - President: Noemí Llauradó (ERC)

Area
  - Total: 6,307.18 km^{2} (2,435.22 sq mi)
  - Rank: 39th in Spain
- Highest elevation (Caro): 1,447 m (4,747 ft)
- Lowest elevation (Mediterranean Sea): 0 m (0 ft)

Population (2025)
  - Total: 875,530
  - Rank: 18th in Spain
  - Density: 138.81/km^{2} (359.53/sq mi)
- Demonym(s): Tarragoní/tarragonina, tarraconense
- Time zone: UTC+1 (CET)
  - Summer (DST): UTC+2 (CEST)
- Website: www.dipta.cat

Tarragona (Spanish: [taraˈɣona]; Catalan: [tərəˈɣonə]) is a province of eastern Spain, in the southern part of the autonomous community of Catalonia. It is bordered by the provinces of Castellón, Teruel, Zaragoza, Lleida and Barcelona and by the Mediterranean Sea.

As of 2025, it has a population of 875,530 in an area of 6,307.18 square kilometres (2,435.22 sq mi) across its 184 municipalities. 16.4% of the population lives in the capital and largest city, Tarragona. Some of the larger cities and towns in Tarragona province include Reus, Salou, Cambrils, El Vendrell, Tortosa, Valls, Amposta. The province includes several World Heritage Sites and is a popular tourist destination. There are Roman Catholic cathedrals in Tarragona and Tortosa.

== History ==
After the Umayyad conquest of Hispania in the late eighth century, this part of Spain came under the control of the Umayyad Caliphate and most of the Iberian peninsula was known as Al-Andalus, and was dominated by Muslim rulers. Abd al-Rahman I founded an independent dynasty that survived in the region until the 11th century.

After the Muslim conquest, the bishopric of Tarragona came under the jurisdiction of the metropolitans of Narbonne or Auch in southern France. In 1089, this was reorganised, and it came under the jurisdiction of the bishopric of Vich, and in 1118, after Tarragona had been reconquered, the Roman Catholic Archdiocese of Tarragona was established.

== Geography ==
The province of Tarragona is in the northeast of Spain with a coast on the Mediterranean Sea. Much of the province is hilly or mountainous and the main feature is the broad valley of the River Ebro and the coastal plain which is backed by the Catalan ranges. In general, industrial development is on the coast and inland is predominantly forest and agricultural land. The Mediterranean Sea lies to the southeast of the province, the province of Barcelona lies to the northeast, Lleida lies to the north, Zaragoza to the northwest, Teruel to the west and Castellón to the southwest. The climate is Mediterranean with hot, dry summers and warm, wet winters.

The area of the province is 6,500 square kilometres (2,500 sq mi). The main crops are cereals, grapes, fruit, olives, hemp, and silk. The province has some mineral resources; copper, lead and silver are found and limestone and marble are quarried. Quarrying for aggregate has caused groundwater levels to fall and the environment has been adversely affected by the arrival of invasive species such as the zebra mussel in the Riba-roja d'Ebre reservoir on the Ebro, the invasive fish Gambusia in the Ebro delta and chemical contamination in the Flix reservoir beside which is a chemical works and a hydro-electric plant.

The highest point in the province is the Mont Caro (1,447 m).

== Municipalities ==
The province has 184 municipalities:

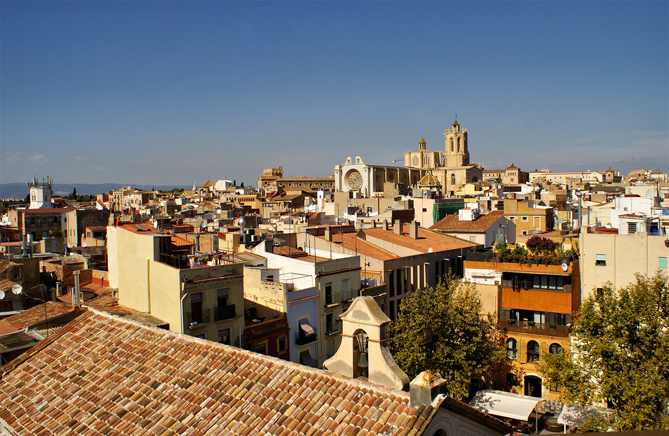
View over the port city of Tarragona

- Aiguamúrcia
- Albinyana
- Alcanar
- Alcover
- Aldover
- Alfara de Carles
- Alforja
- Alió
- Almoster
- Altafulla
- Amposta
- Arbolí
- Arnes
- Ascó
- Banyeres del Penedès
- Barberà de la Conca
- Batea
- Bellmunt del Priorat
- Bellvei
- Benifallet
- Benissanet
- Blancafort
- Bonastre
- Bot
- Botarell
- Bràfim
- Cabacés
- Cabra del Camp
- Calafell
- Camarles
- Cambrils
- Capafonts
- Capçanes
- Caseres
- Castellvell del Camp
- Colldejou
- Conesa
- Constantí
- Corbera d'Ebre
- Cornudella de Montsant
- Creixell
- Cunit
- Deltebre
- Duesaigües
- El Catllar
- El Lloar
- El Masroig
- El Milà
- El Molar
- El Montmell
- El Morell
- El Perelló
- El Pinell de Brai
- El Pla de Santa Maria
- El Pont d'Armentera
- El Rourell
- El Vendrell
- Els Garidells
- Els Guiamets
- Els Pallaresos
- Falset
- Figuerola del Camp
- Flix
- Forès
- Freginals
- Gandesa
- Garcia
- Ginestar
- Godall
- Gratallops
- Horta de Sant Joan
- L'Albiol
- L'Aldea
- L'Aleixar
- L'Ametlla de Mar
- L'Ampolla
- L'Arboç
- L'Argentera
- L'Espluga de Francolí
- La Bisbal de Montsant
- La Bisbal del Penedès
- La Canonja
- La Fatarella
- La Febró
- La Figuera
- La Galera
- La Masó
- La Morera de Montsant
- La Nou de Gaià
- La Palma d'Ebre
- La Pobla de Mafumet
- La Pobla de Massaluca
- La Pobla de Montornès
- La Ràpita
- La Riba
- La Riera de Gaià
- La Secuita
- La Selva del Camp
- La Sénia
- La Torre de Fontaubella
- La Torre de l'Espanyol
- La Vilella Alta
- La Vilella Baixa
- Les Borges del Camp
- Les Piles
- Llorac
- Llorenç del Penedès
- Marçà
- Margalef
- Mas de Barberans
- Masdenverge
- Masllorenç
- Maspujols
- Miravet
- Mont-ral
- Mont-roig del Camp
- Montblanc
- Montbrió del Camp
- Montferri
- Móra d'Ebre
- Móra la Nova
- Nulles
- Passanant i Belltall
- Paüls
- Perafort
- Pira
- Poboleda
- Pontils
- Porrera
- Pradell de la Teixeta
- Prades
- Prat de Comte
- Pratdip
- Puigpelat
- Querol
- Rasquera
- Renau
- Reus
- Riba-roja d'Ebre
- Riudecanyes
- Riudecols
- Riudoms
- Rocafort de Queralt
- Roda de Berà
- Rodonyà
- Roquetes
- Salomó
- Salou
- Sant Jaume d'Enveja
- Sant Jaume dels Domenys
- Santa Bàrbara
- Santa Coloma de Queralt
- Santa Oliva
- Sarral
- Savallà del Comtat
- Senan
- Solivella
- Tarragona
- Tivenys
- Tivissa
- Torredembarra
- Torroja del Priorat
- Tortosa
- Ulldecona
- Ulldemolins
- Vallclara
- Vallfogona de Riucorb
- Vallmoll
- Valls
- Vandellòs i l'Hospitalet de l'Infant
- Vespella de Gaià
- Vila-rodona
- Vila-seca
- Vilabella
- Vilalba dels Arcs
- Vilallonga del Camp
- Vilanova d'Escornalbou
- Vilanova de Prades
- Vilaplana
- Vilaverd
- Vimbodí i Poblet
- Vinebre
- Vinyols i els Arcs
- Xerta

== Demographics ==
Historical population
Year	Pop.	±%
1842	248,476	—
1857	320,593	+29.0%
1877	333,468	+4.0%
1887	348,606	+4.5%
1900	343,400	−1.5%
1910	343,127	−0.1%
1920	359,334	+4.7%
1930	351,698	−2.1%
1940	346,433	−1.5%
1950	356,864	+3.0%
1960	363,472	+1.9%
1970	433,138	+19.2%
1981	513,050	+18.4%
1991	542,004	+5.6%
2001	609,673	+12.5%
2011	807,044	+32.4%
2021	823,435	+2.0%
Source: INE

As of 2025, the population is 875,530, of which 50.1% are males, and 49.9% are females. Minors make up 17.5% of the population, and seniors make up 20.1%.

=== Immigration ===
As of 2025, immigrants make up 23.6% of the population. The 5 largest foreign countries of birth are Morocco, Colombia, Romania, Argentina, and Venezuela.

== Tourism ==
As well as the port city of Tarragona, the province has much to offer for tourists. There are Catalan villages to visit, historic sites, sandy beaches, rocky shores, crags, rivers and woodlands and several wildlife reserves. The area has been publicised under the Costa Daurada (golden coast) brand.

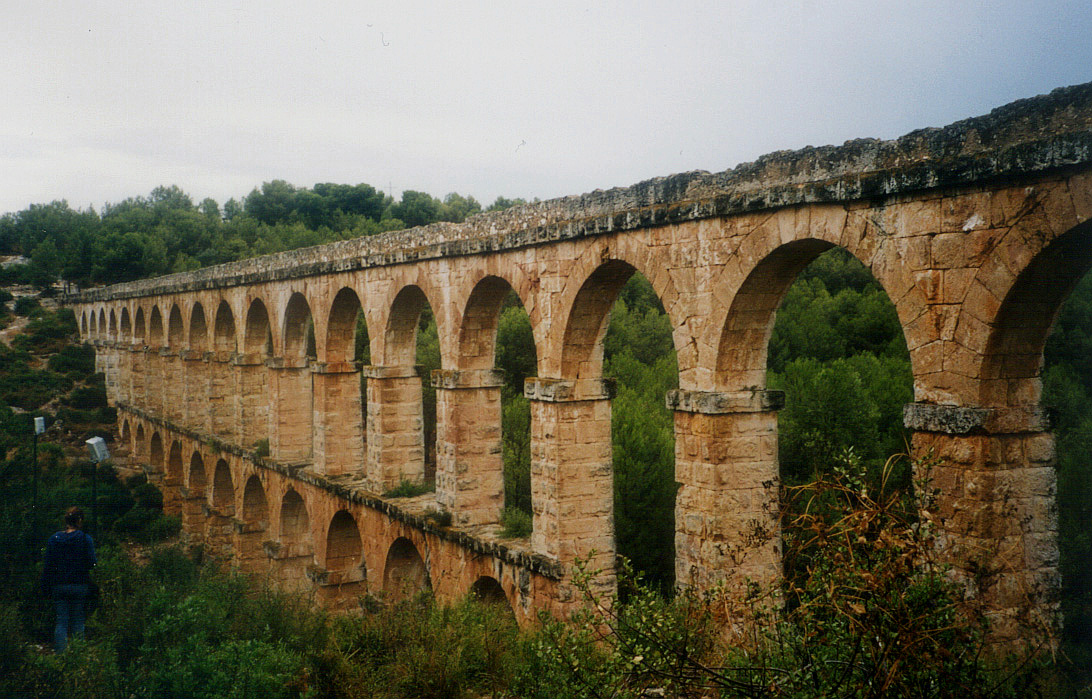
Les Ferreres Aqueduct

The city of Tarragona may have been founded by the Phoenicians and was a major city in Roman times that they called Tarraco. There are many archaeological remains from that period but little remains of the second century amphitheatre; after the collapse of the Western Roman Empire, the abandoned structure was quarried to provide stone for building. The Les Ferreres Aqueduct dates from the same period and has survived intact. It was built to supply water to the ancient city and is part of the Archaeological Ensemble of Tarraco which has been listed as a UNESCO World Heritage Site since 2000. The city also houses a cathedral, dating from the twelfth and thirteenth centuries, which combines Romanesque and Gothic architectural features. There are also many historic churches and convents.

The Catalan authorities have designated four villages as "family holiday destinations". These are Calafell, Cambrils, La Pineda and nearby Vila-seca, and Salou. Salou is the site of the PortAventura World (PortAventura Park, the most visited theme park in Spain, Ferrari Land and also the PortAventura Caribe Aquatic Park).

The Costa Daurada is served by Reus Airport which receives tourist traffic from passengers journeying to the beach resorts of Salou and Cambrils as well as those travelling to Barcelona. It is a destination of low-cost flights provider Ryanair, and planes fly to Reus from many different European and North African locations. The province also has good road and rail links to Barcelona and southwards to Valencia, Murcia and Andalusia along the coastal strip, and high-speed rail services from Tarragona to Madrid started in 2008.

There are several monasteries in the province that can be visited by following the "Cistercian Monastery Route". The best known is the Cistercian monastery of Poblet in the comarca of Conca de Barberà, which is a UNESCO World Heritage site. Other monasteries on the route include the Santes Creus, in the municipality of Aiguamúrcia, and Vallbona de les Monges.

Other attractions of the province include the food and wine. The "Penedès Wine and Cava Route" is a tourist trail offering wine-related activities. There are also festivals celebrating local fare, where local gastronomic specialities are eaten, including calçots (grilled spring onions) in Valls, and Xató a sauce served with fish or an endive salad.

== Transport ==
The only airport in the province is Reus Airport which provides direct routes to some European destinations. However, Josep Tarradellas Barcelona–El Prat Airport is also frequently used by air travellers from the province which provides more domestic and international destinations. The airport is located 86 km (53 mi) which is an hour drive south west of Tarragona.

== See also ==
- List of communities in Tarragona
- Comarques of Catalonia
