= Montsant DO =

Spanish wine region

Coordinates: 41°8′49″N 0°49′17″E

Montsant DOP
- Wine region
- Montsant DOP in the province of Tarragona in the region of Catalonia
- Official name: Denominació d'Origen Montsant
- Type: Denominación de Origen Protegida (DOP)
- Year established: 2002
- Country: Spain
- Precipitation (annual average): 400–600 mm
- Size of planted vineyards: 1,844 hectares (4,557 acres)
- No. of wineries: 55
- Wine produced: 45,549 hectolitres
- Comments: Data for 2016 / 2017

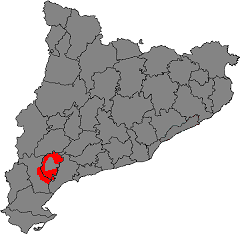
Montsant DOP in Catalonia

Montsant (Catalan pronunciation: [munˈsan]) is a Spanish Denominación de Origen Protegida (DOP) (Denominació d'Origen Protegida in Catalan) for wine located in the province of Tarragona (Catalonia, Spain) and covers 12 municipalities. It was previously known as the Falset subzone of Tarragona (DO), and was created as a separate DO in the early 2000s. Regional approval came in 2001, and from 2002 wines were sold as Montsant rather than Tarragona. Montsant takes its name from the Montsant Mountains in the area.

Under the auspices of the DOP Montsant, the region has seen rapid growth, starting with 28 official cellars in 2002 which grew to number 55 currently. Approximately 94% of the production is of red wine with 62% exportation outside Spain, 28% consumed in Catalonia, and 10% sold to the rest of Spain.

== Geography ==
Montsant DOP almost completely surrounds the more famous Priorat (DOQ). The vineyards extend along the mountainsides among olive groves, forests and rocky outcrops. The denomination covers the area of Priorat comarca that is not part of DOQ Priorat as well as part of the neighboring comarca of Ribera d'Ebre. In total, 17 villages are included: La Bisbal de Montsant, Cabacés, Capçanes, Cornudella de Montsant, La Figuera, els Guiamets, Marçà, Margalef, El Masroig, Pradell de la Teixeta, La Torre de Fontaubella, Ulldemolins, along with portions of Falset, Garcia, El Molar, Móra la Nova and Tivissa (the sub-villages of Darmós and La Serra d'Almos.

== Soils ==
Vineyards range from 200 to 700 meters in elevation and sit on three main soil types: chalky clay, granitic sand, and slate. The elevation tends to increase towards the Serra de Montalt in the southwest and towards the Serra de Montsant in the northwest. There is a large degree of variation from the small, relatively flat plain around Falset and Marçà to the higher elevation village of La Figuera that sits on a mountain range at 575 meters.

== Climate ==
The climate is Mediterranean with continental influences. Summers are dry and annual rainfall is about 650 mm, falling mainly in autumn. There is only an occasional risk of hailstones or frost.

== Authorised grape varieties ==
The authorised grape varieties are:

- Red: Garnatxa Negra, Carinyena, Ull de llebre, Syrah, Merlot, and Cabernet Sauvignon
- White: Garnatxa Blanca, Macabeu / Viura, Chardonnay, Moscatell d’Alexandria, and Xarel·lo

== Wine styles ==
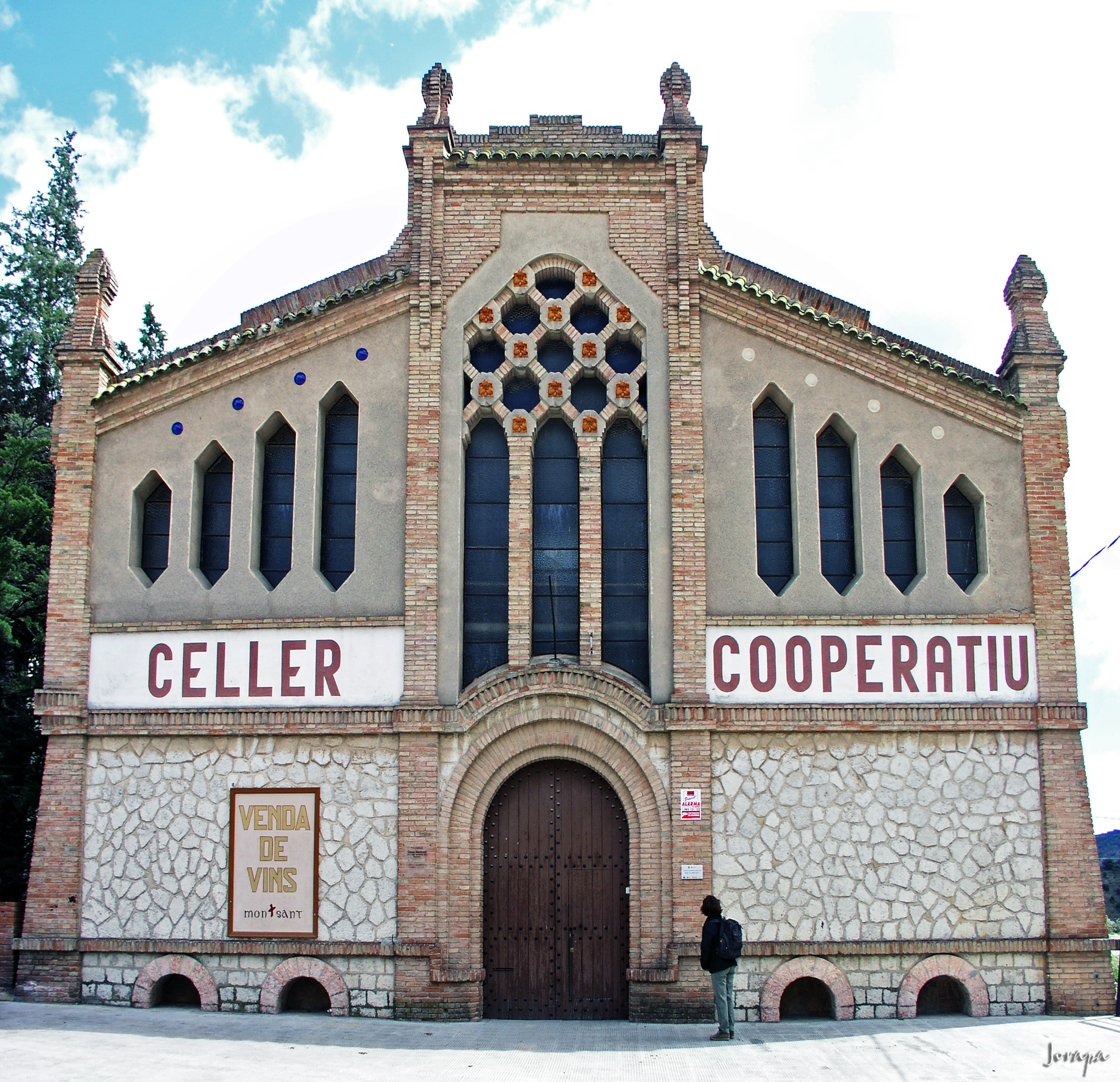
Celler Cooperatiu de Cornudella. Montsant DOP winery in Cornudella de Montsant

The main style of Montsant is powerful red wines, which can be similar to the wines of Priorat when they are made from old vine Grenache and Carignan. Production also includes white wines, rosé wines, sweet red wines and 'vi ranci' style wines made using a Solera system.

=== Kosher ===
DOP Montsant has the distinction of being the only region in Catalonia (and one of only a handful) in Spain where kosher wine is produced.

== See also ==
- Catalan wine
