= Villela =

Villela may refer to:

- Villela (village), a village in Rebolledo de la Torre, province of Burgos, Spain

Villela is also a surname of Spanish origin. Notable people with the name include:

- Ana Paula Pereira da Silva Villela, Brazilian women's association football forward.
- Angela Villela Olinto. American astroparticle physicist and provost of Columbia University.
- Armida Villela de López Contreras, Hondurean politician.
- Marco Villela nicknamed Gigante (The Giant), a 5th degree Brazilian jiu-jitsu (BJJ) black belt.
- Vanessa Villela, a Mexican-American actress turned real estate agent.
- Bruno Barreto, Bruno Villela Barreto Borges, Brazilian film director.

== See also ==
- Vilela
- Vilella
- Villella
