= Entença (town) =

Coordinates: 42°04′04″N 0°33′13″E

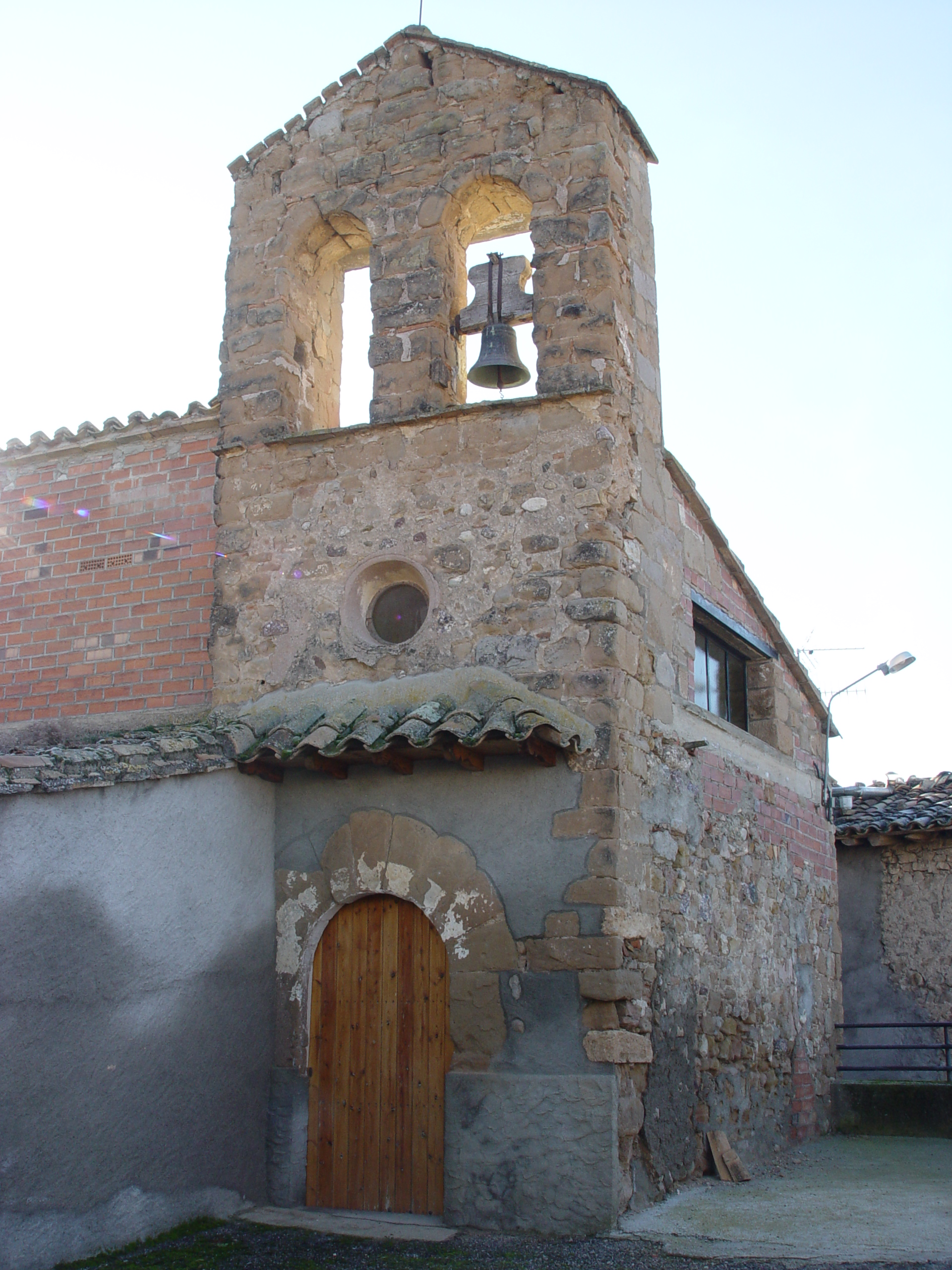
St. James' Church of Entença.

Coat of arms of the ancient House of Entença.

Entença, Entenza or Antenza is a village in the La Franja area of Aragon. It is located at a height of 576 m above sea level in the Ribagorça comarca, Huesca Province, 10 km to the east-southeast of Benavarri, town to which it belongs administratively. Its zip code is 22580.

Like many small towns in the Pre-Pyrenees, Entença has lost much population in the past 50 years. According to the 2007 census it has only 14 inhabitants. The most important buildings are the recently restored St. James' Church with only one bell in its two-eyed bell-gable, as well as the now ruined residence of Queen Teresa d'Entença, Countess of Urgell and Viscountess of Àger (1314–1327), wife of King Alfons IV of Aragon.

The town gathers some of its former inhabitants and tourists every 25 July on the St. James' celebrations, as well as every 6 August on the occasion of Sant Salvador's county fair at the small Sant Salvador d'Entença church located out of the town perimeter.

== History ==
Entença is the place of origin of the ancient House of Entença, one of the main dynasties of the ancient Crown of Aragon. The Barony of Entença was established in the lower River Cinca valley and also 90 km further south, in the Priorat and Terres de l'Ebre, lands conquered to the Saracens.

Because of this historical significance, streets or squares named 'Entença' or 'Entenza' are common in towns and villages throughout Catalonia, the Valencian Community and the Balearic Islands.

The first mention of the town in a document was in 1036, according to Àngel Canellas López in his Colección diplomática de San Andrés de Fanlo.

== See also ==
- Teresa d'Entença
- House of Entença
