= Punta del Curull =

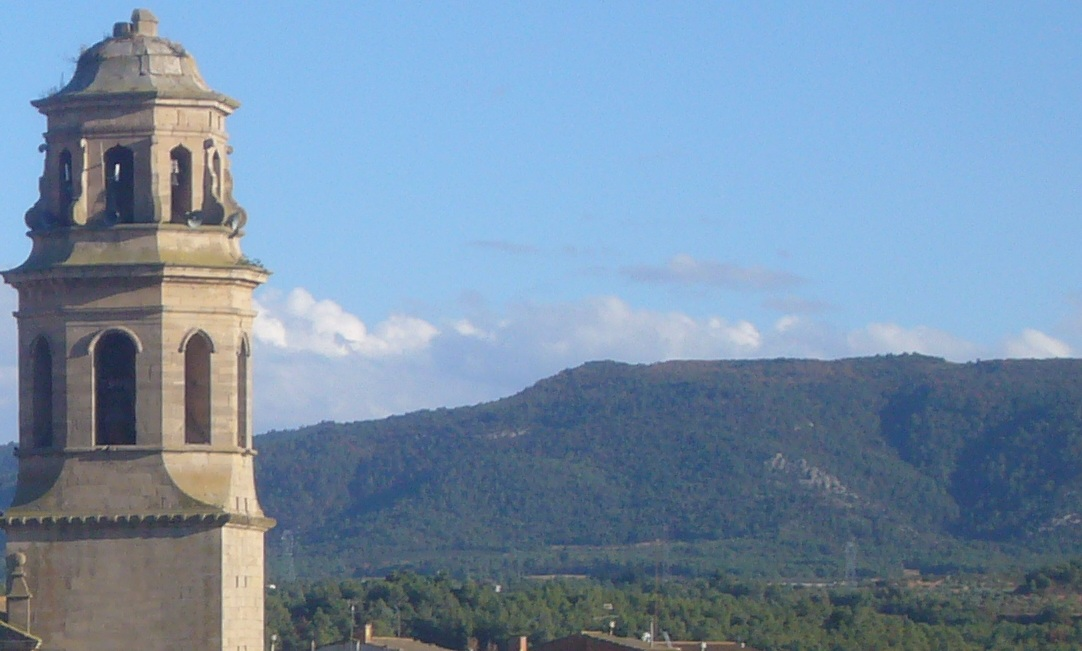
- Punta del Curull, as seen from L'Albi

Highest point
- Elevation: 1,021 m (3,350 ft)
- Coordinates: 41°21′18″N 0°57′51″E

Geography
- Location within Catalonia
- Location: Vilanova de Prades (Conca de Barberà); La Pobla de Cérvoles (Garrigues), Catalonia
- Parent range: Serra de la Llena

Climbing
- First ascent: unknown

Punta del Curull is a mountain of Catalonia, Spain. It has an elevation of 1,021 metres above sea level. It is the highest point of Serra de la Llena.

== See also ==
- Mountains of Catalonia
