= Vilella =

Vilella may refer to:

== People ==
- Eva Ortiz Vilella (born 1975), Spanish politician
- Roberto Sánchez Vilella (1913–1997), governor of Puerto Rico
- Mario Vilella Martínez (born 1995), Spanish tennis player

== Other uses ==
- La Vilella Alta, village in Spain
- La Vilella Baixa, village in Spain
- Roberto Sánchez Vilella School of Public Administration, college in Puerto Rico

See also:

- Vilela
- Villela
- Villella
