= Bellmunt =

Bellmunt may refer to:

- Bellmunt de Mesquí or Belmonte de San José, town in Aragon
- Bellmunt d'Urgell, town in Catalonia
- Bellmunt del Priorat, town in Catalonia
- Bellmunt de Segarra, village in Catalonia
- Bellmunt, mountain in the Sub-Pyrenees
