= Azahara =

Azahara may refer to:

- a palace in Falset, Tarragona, Spain
- Azahara Muñoz (born 1987), Spanish professional golfer
- Medina Azahara, the ruins of an Arab Muslim medieval palace in Córdoba, Spain
