= Serra de la Llena =

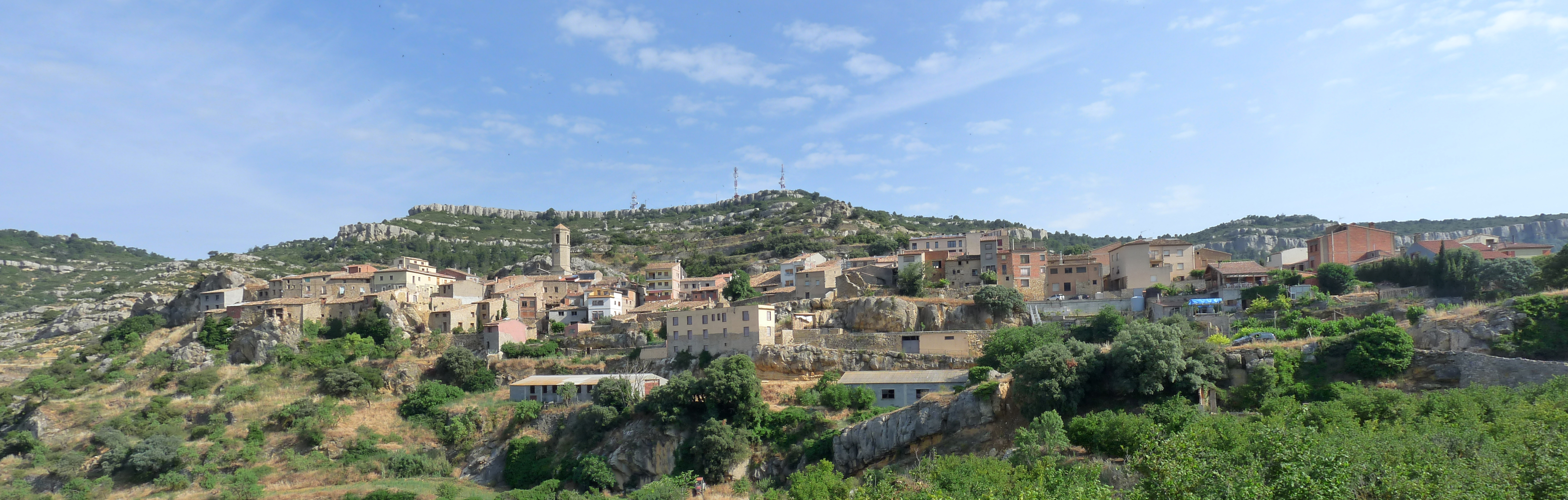
- The Serra de la Llena above Vilanova de Prades

Highest point
- Elevation: 1,021 m (3,350 ft)
- Coordinates: 41°20′36″N 0°53′32″E

Geography
- Location within Spain
- Location: Conca de Barberà, Garrigues, Priorat, (Catalonia)
- Parent range: Catalan Pre-Coastal Range

Geology
- Mountain type: Conglomerate

Climbing
- Easiest route: From Vilanova de Prades

Serra de la Llena, also known as Serra la Llena, is a mountain chain straddling the municipal terms of Vilanova de Prades (Conca de Barberà comarca), La Pobla de Cérvoles (Garrigues) and Ulldemolins (Priorat), in Catalonia, Spain. These mountains have characteristic large and rounded rocky outcrops.

The range runs in an east to west direction and is part of the Catalan Pre-Coastal Range. The main peak is Punta del Curull (1021 m), other summits are Penya Alta (1015 m), Punta del General (924 m), Punta de Viern (904 m), Punta del Moliner (902 m), Punta del Marc (901 m), Punta del Ponç (892 m) and Punta d'en Llor (891 m).

The Serra de la Llena runs parallel to the Serra de Montsant. The Montsant River runs at the feet of the southern face and the town of Vilanova de Prades is located amidst the rocky outcrops of the range, near the eastern summits. The Llena mountain range also makes for the mainspring for the Set river, from where its 28-mile length of water rises and flows.

== See also ==
- Montsant
- Catalan Pre-Coastal Range
- Mountains of Catalonia
