= Els Guiamets =

- Municipality
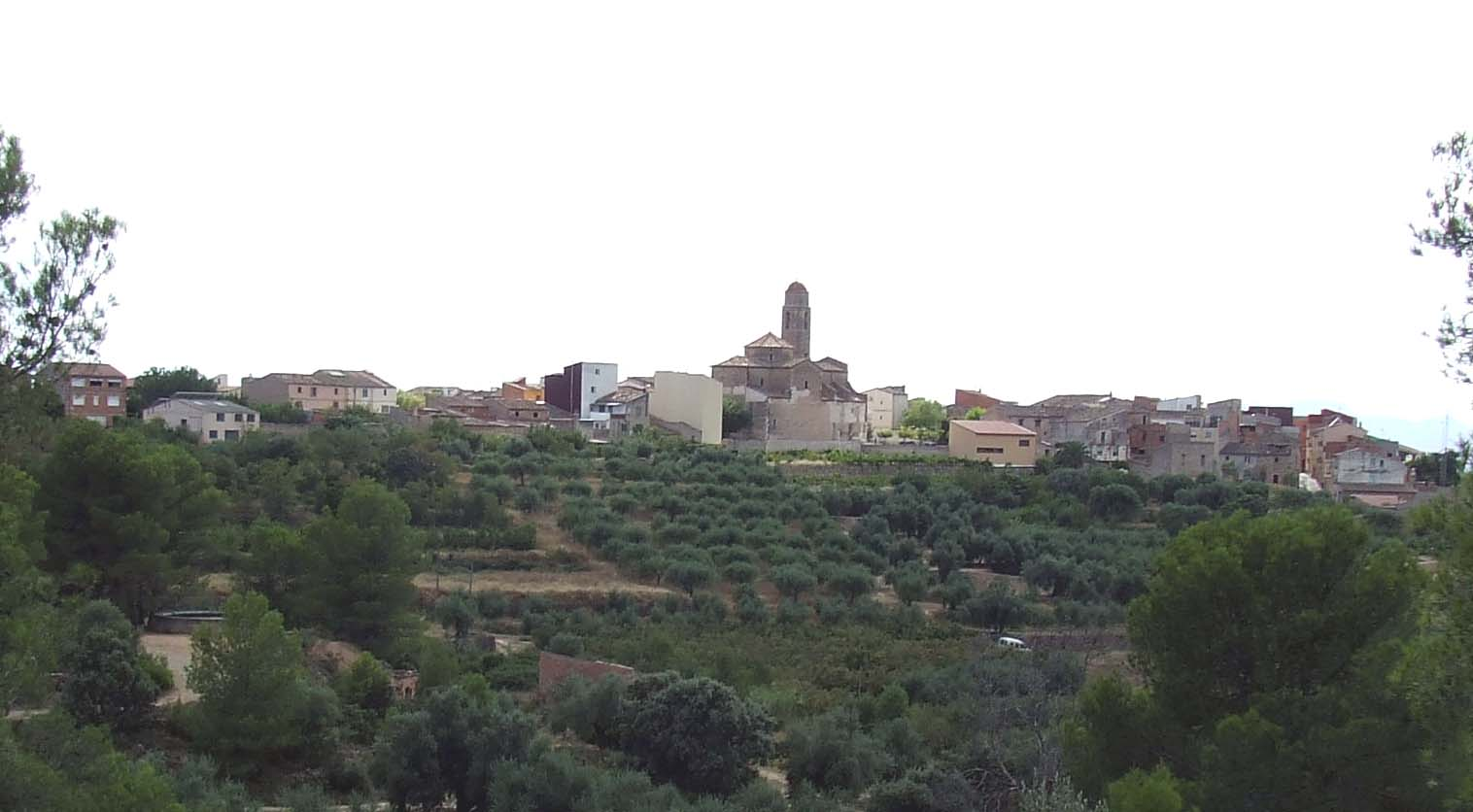

- Coat of arms

- Location in Catalonia
- Coordinates: 41°06′13″N 0°45′14″E
- Country: Spain
- Community: Catalonia
- Province: Tarragona
- Comarca: Priorat

Government
  - Mayor: Miquel Perelló Segura (2015)

Area
  - Total: 12.1 km^{2} (4.7 sq mi)
- Elevation: 220 m (720 ft)

Population (2025-01-01)
  - Total: 254
  - Density: 21.0/km^{2} (54.4/sq mi)
- Demonym(s): Guiametà, guiametana
- Website: www.guiamets.altanet.org

Els Guiamets (Catalan pronunciation: [loz giaˈmets]) is a municipality in the comarca of the Priorat in Catalonia, Spain. It is situated in the south of the comarca. A local road links the village to the N-420 road between Falset and Móra la Nova. The Guiamets reservoir is on an affluent of the Siurana (Tarragona).

== History ==
In medieval times the town was part of the Barony of Entença.

== Notable people ==
- Neus Català (1915-2019), activist and member of the Unified Socialist Party of Catalonia (PSUC) during Spanish Civil War. She was the only Spanish survivor of the concentration camp of Ravensbrück.

== Demographics ==
It has a population of 254 (register office, 2025).

1900	1930	1950	1970	1986	2007
413	416	332	339	305	332

== Bibliography ==
- Panareda Clopés, Josep Maria; Rios Calvet, Jaume; Rabella Vives, Josep Maria (1989). Guia de Catalunya, Barcelona: Caixa de Catalunya. ISBN 84-87135-01-3 (Spanish). ISBN 84-87135-02-1 (Catalan).
