= Montsant =

- Montsant, a mountain range in Catalonia, Spain
- Montsant DO, a certain wine quality from the Montsant region, Spain
