= El Lloar =

- Municipality
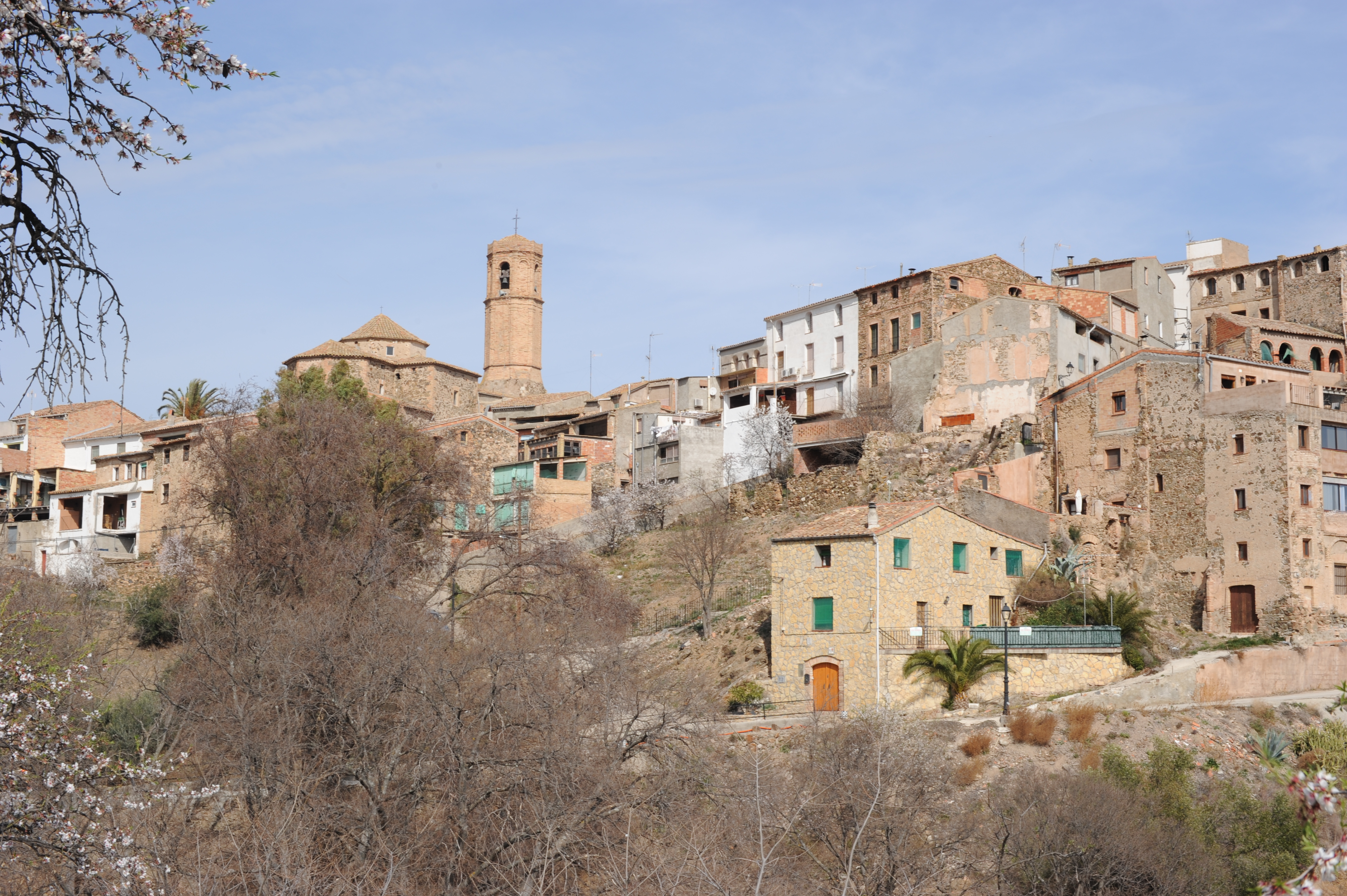
- El Lloar

- Flag Coat of arms

- Location in Catalonia
- Coordinates: 41°11′16″N 0°45′5″E
- Country: Spain
- Community: Catalonia
- Province: Tarragona
- Comarca: Priorat

Government
  - Mayor: Jaume Montalbo Roigé (2015)

Area
  - Total: 6.6 km^{2} (2.5 sq mi)

Population (2025-01-01)
  - Total: 99
  - Density: 15/km^{2} (39/sq mi)
- Website: lloar.org

El Lloar (Catalan pronunciation: [eʎ ʎoˈa]; locally [lo ʎoˈa]) is a village in the province of Tarragona and autonomous community of Catalonia, Spain. It has a population of 99 (register office, 2025).
