= Mola de Colldejou =

Mountain chain in Catalonia, Spain

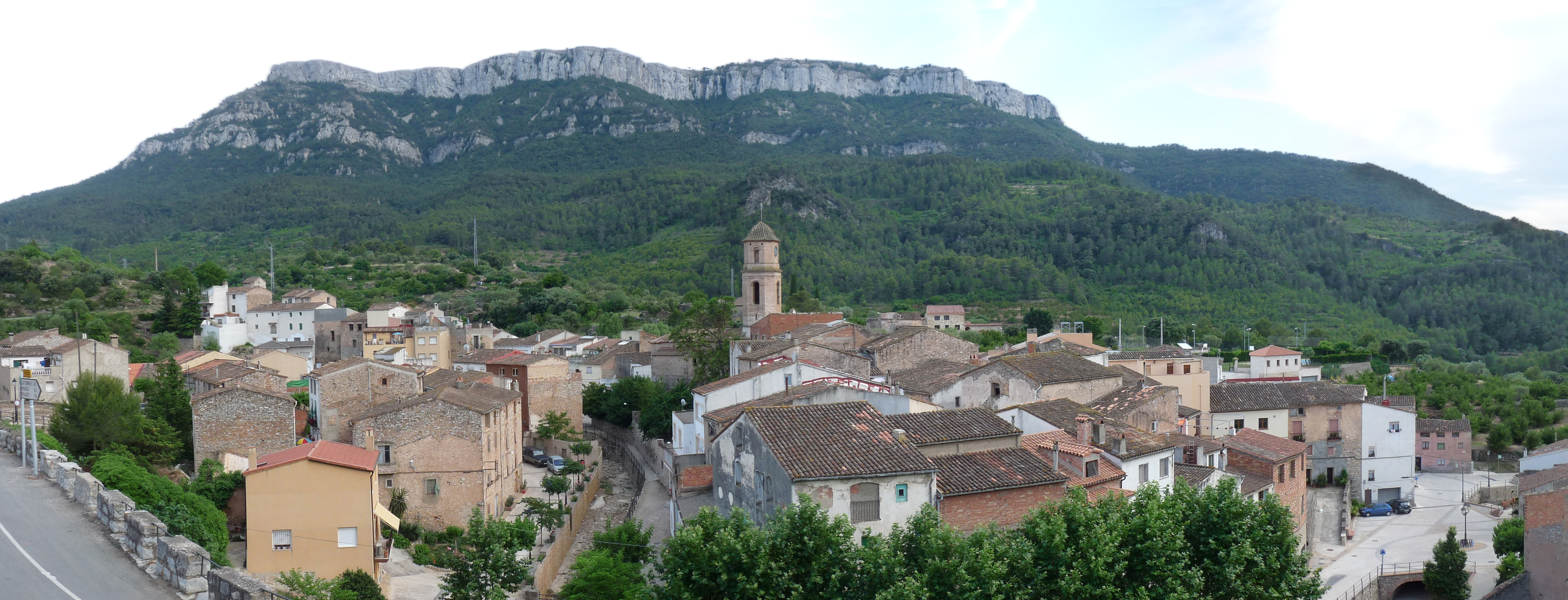
- North face of Mola de Colldejou rising above La Torre de Fontaubella

Highest point
- Elevation: 921.8 m (3,024 ft)
- Listing: Mountains of Catalonia
- Coordinates: 41°6′32.08″N 0°52′26.43″E

Geography
- Location within Catalonia
- Country: Spain
- Community: Catalonia
- Counties: Baix Camp and Priorat
- Parent range: Catalan Pre-Coastal Range

Geology
- Mountain type: Karstic

Climbing
- First ascent: Unknown
- Easiest route: From Colldejou or La Torre de Fontaubella

Mola de Colldejou is a mountain chain in Catalonia, Spain located north of the Serra de Llaberia in the Catalan Pre-Coastal Range. The highest point is 921.8 m above sea level.

This mountain range is named after Colldejou village, located east of the range.

== See also ==
- Catalan Pre-Coastal Range
- Mountains of Catalonia
