= Set (river) =

River in Spain

Coordinates: 41°29′42″N 0°40′51″E

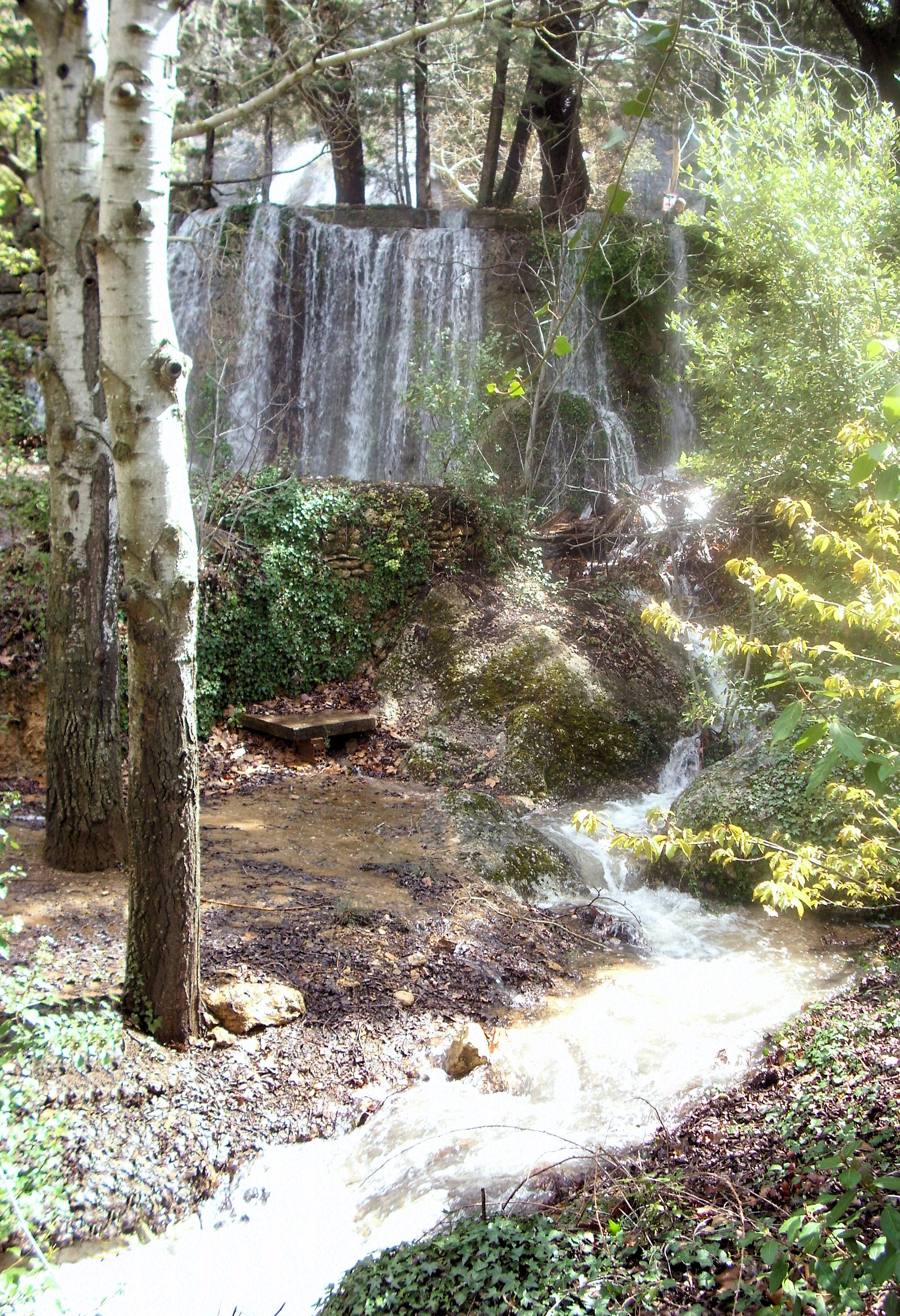

Location
- Country: Spain

Physical characteristics
- Source
  - location: Llena mountain range
  - elevation: 950 m (3,120 ft)
- Mouth
  - location: Sudanell
- Length: 45 km (28 mi)

Basin features
- River system: Segre River

The Set (riu de Set in Catalan) is a river in Catalonia (northeastern Spain).
