= Poboleda =

- Municipality
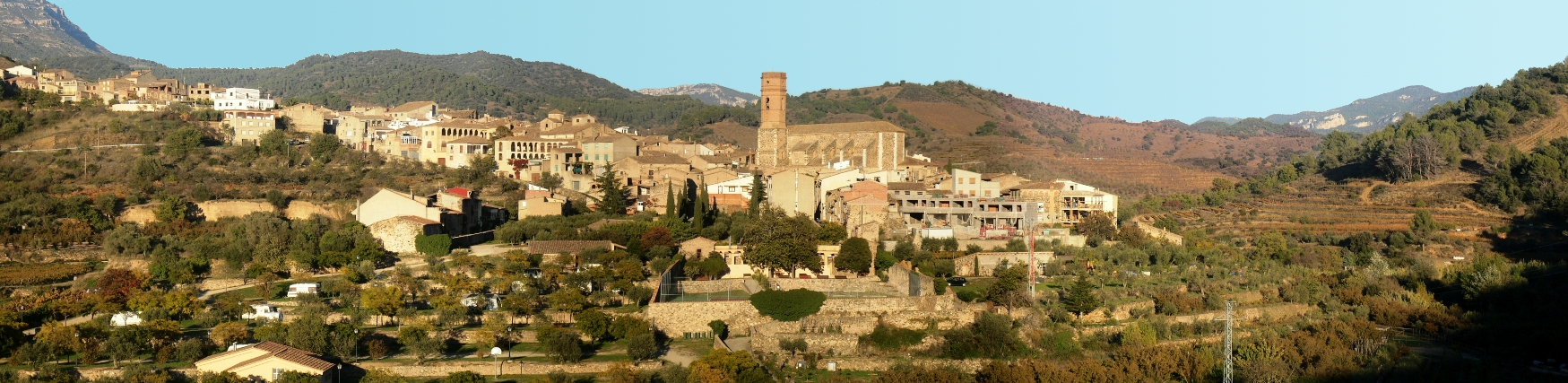
- Poboleda

- Coat of arms

- Location in Catalonia
- Coordinates: 41°14′N 0°51′E
- Country: Spain
- Community: Catalonia
- Province: Tarragona
- Comarca: Priorat

Government
  - Mayor: Jordi Català Jasan (2015)

Area
  - Total: 14.0 km^{2} (5.4 sq mi)

Population (2025-01-01)
  - Total: 345
  - Density: 24.6/km^{2} (63.8/sq mi)
- Website: www.poboleda.cat

Poboleda (Catalan pronunciation: [poβoˈlɛða]) is a village in the province of Tarragona and autonomous community of Catalonia, Spain. It has a population of 345 (register office, 2025).
