= Garcia, Spain =

Garcia
- Municipality
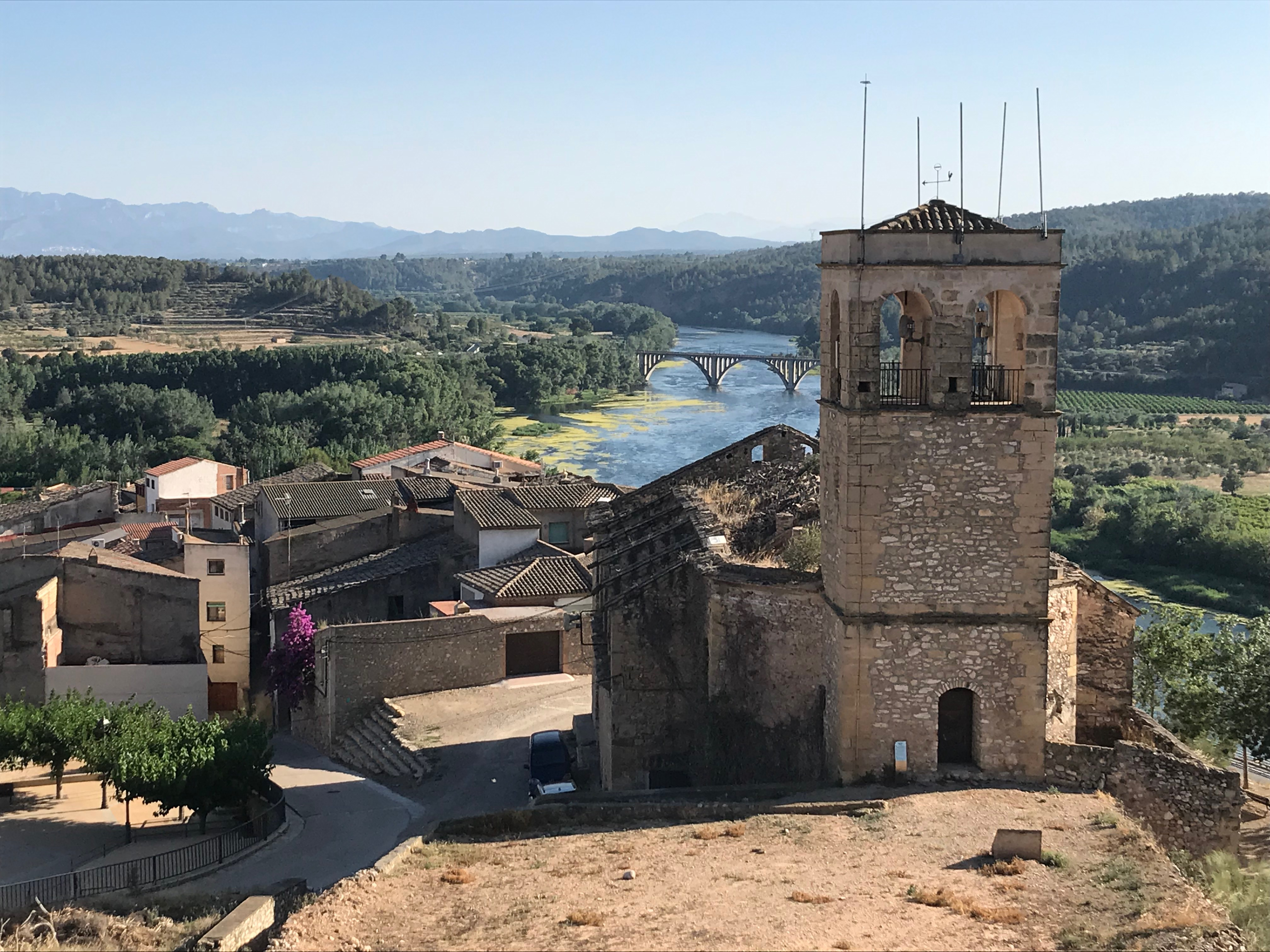
- Old church

- Coat of arms

- Location in Catalonia
- Coordinates: 41°8′19″N 0°39′5″E
- Country: Spain
- Community: Catalonia
- Province: Tarragona
- Comarca: Ribera d'Ebre

Government
  - mayor: Blanca López Quiñones (2015)

Area
  - Total: 52.4 km^{2} (20.2 sq mi)
- Elevation: 73 m (240 ft)

Population (2025-01-01)
  - Total: 551
  - Density: 10.5/km^{2} (27.2/sq mi)
- Demonym(s): Garcià, garciana
- Postal code: 43749
- Website: www.garcia.altanet.org

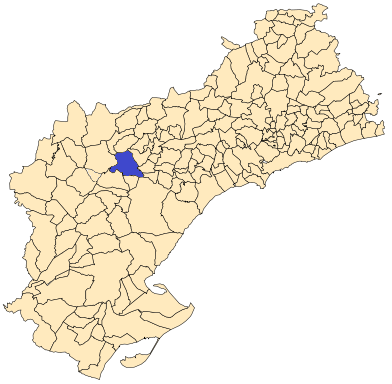
Location of Garcia municipal term within Tarragona Province

Garcia (Catalan pronunciation: [gaɾˈsia]) is a Spanish municipality in the Catalan comarca of Ribera d'Ebre, whose territory extends over both sides of the Ebre river. It has a population of 551 (register office, 2025).

== History and archaeology ==
Garcia has been a site of human occupation at least since ancient Iberian times. It constitutes a privileged viewpoint towards the Ebre River, from Flix till a bit further than Móra d'Ebre and, besides, accessing it is difficult. Fragments of black varnished pottery were found, belonging to the iberian period.

The area was reconquered from the Moors in 1153, by count Ramon Berenguer IV of Barcelona. In medieval times the town was part of the Barony of Entença.

According to an 1156 document by which Ramon Berenguer IV ceded the territory to the Poblet Monastery, Garcia was linked to neighboring El Molar town. This situation ended in the 19th century.

== Economy ==
Traditionally, the predominant activity has always been agriculture. On the irrigated land, vegetables and fruit trees are grown, while on the unirrigated terrain, vines, hazelnuts and olives are cultivated. Pigs and chickens are also reared.
