= Capçanes =

- Municipality
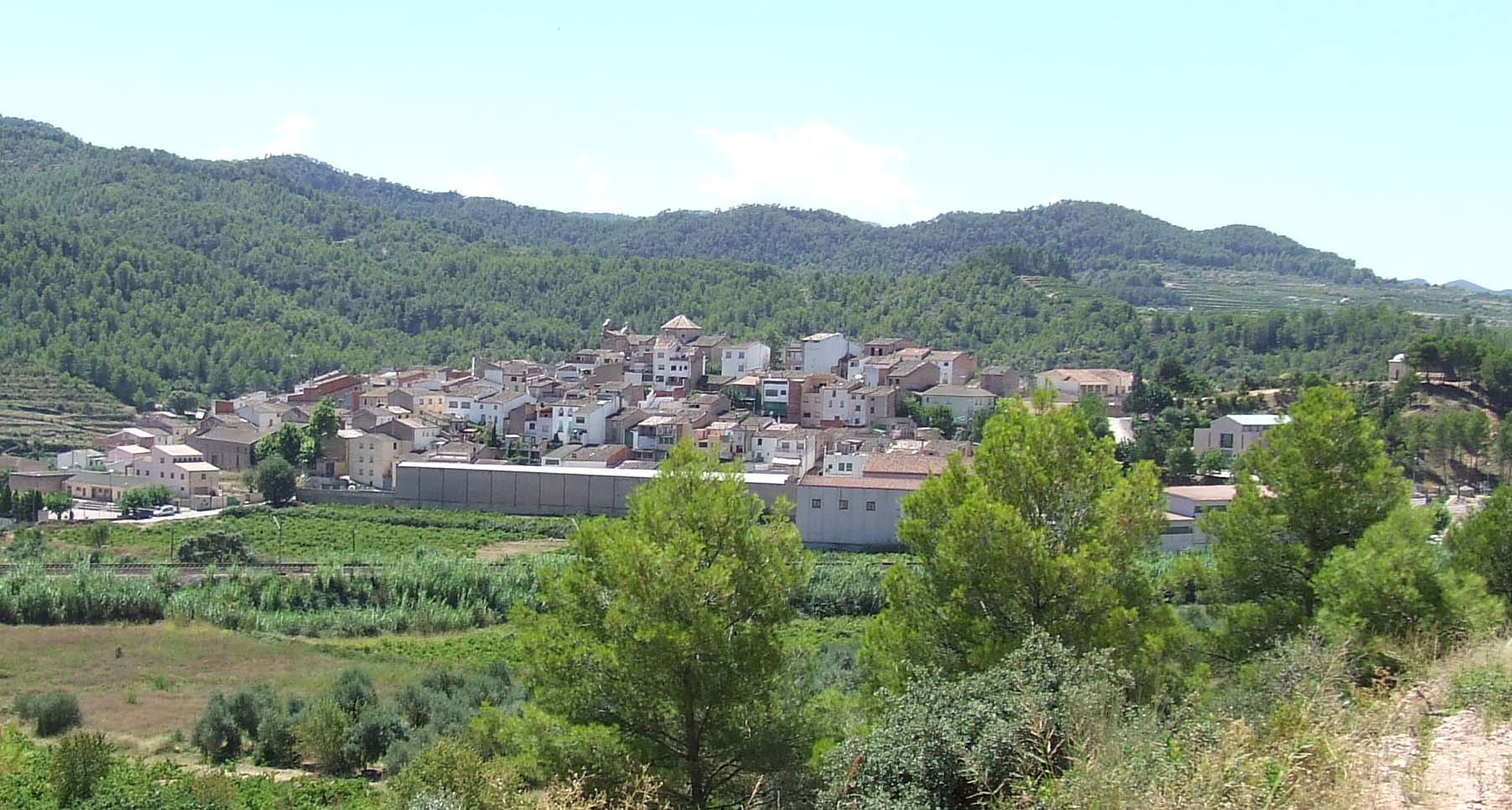
- Capçanes from the east

- Coat of arms

- Location in Catalonia
- Coordinates: 41.102°N 0.782°E
- Country: Spain
- Community: Catalonia
- Province: Tarragona
- Comarca: Priorat

Government
  - Mayor: Juan Carlos Carlos Vaqué (2015)

Area
  - Total: 22.5 km^{2} (8.7 sq mi)
- Elevation: 238 m (781 ft)

Population (2025-01-01)
  - Total: 444
  - Density: 19.7/km^{2} (51.1/sq mi)
- Website: capcanes.org

Capçanes (Catalan pronunciation: [kapˈsanes]) is a Catalan village in the province of Tarragona in north-eastern Spain. It is situated in the comarca of Priorat. It has a population of 444 (register office, 2025).

== Geography ==
Capçanes is situated about 7 km (4.4 mi) south of Falset, 40 km (25 mi) west of Tarragona, and about 160 km (100 mi) south-west of Barcelona.

== Economy ==
The village's main activity is agriculture, predominantly wine-growing, but also olive and almond production.

== Sights ==
- Monument to Carrasclet, who was born in the village, by Francesc Carulla i Serra.
- Wine-growers' cooperative, founded in 1933.

== Sons and daughters of the village ==
Pere Joan Barceló i Anguera (1687–1741), a.k.a. Carrasclet ("Carbon seller," a reference to his occupation), guerrillero, who fought in the War of Spanish Succession on the side of Archduke Charles of Austria against the Bourbons and who died in exile.
