= Porrera =

- Municipality
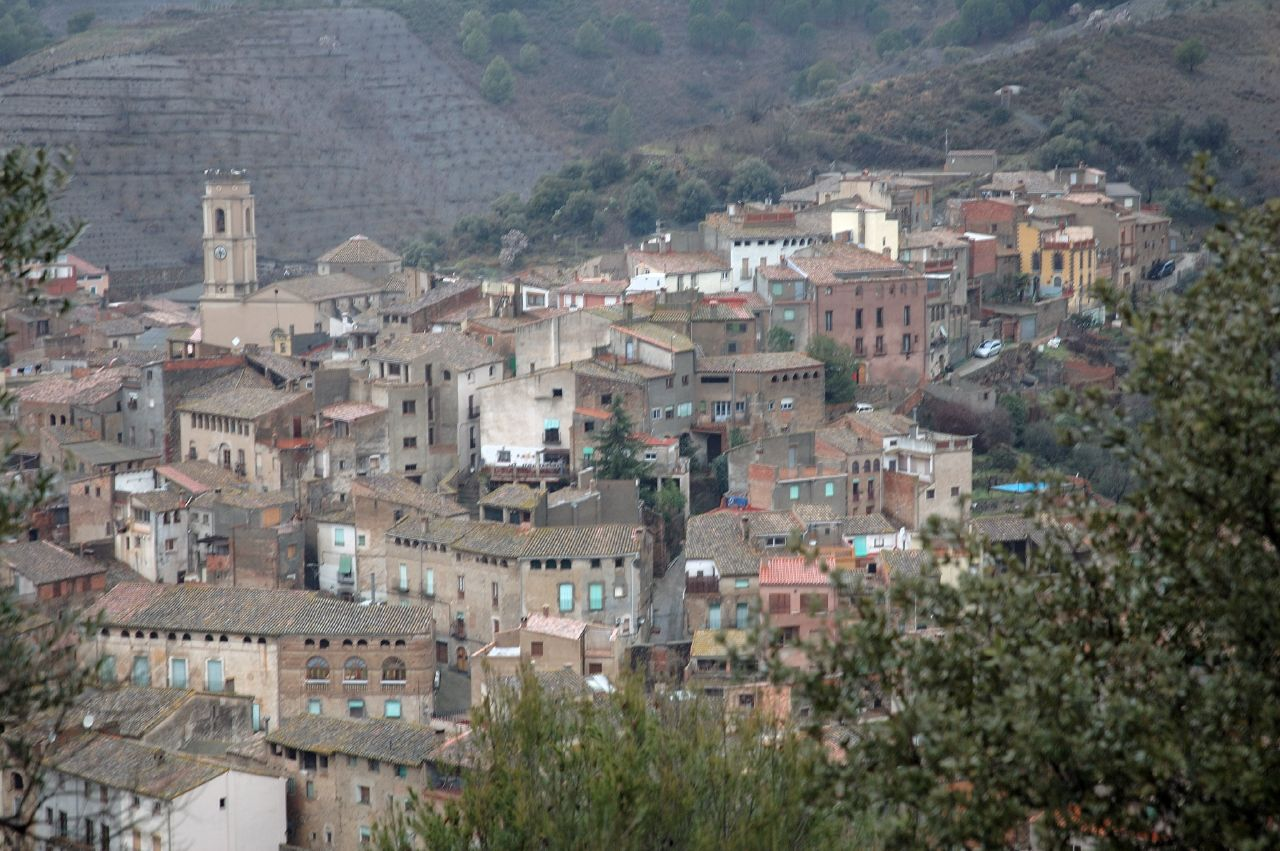
- Porrera

- Location in Catalonia
- Coordinates: 41°11′N 0°51′E
- Country: Spain
- Community: Catalonia
- Province: Tarragona
- Comarca: Priorat

Government
  - Mayor: Joan Carles García(2025)

Area
  - Total: 28.8 km^{2} (11.1 sq mi)

Population (2025-01-01)
  - Total: 405
  - Density: 14.1/km^{2} (36.4/sq mi)
- Website: www.porrera.org

Porrera (Catalan pronunciation: [poˈreɾa]) is a village in the province of Tarragona and autonomous community of Catalonia, Spain. It has a population of 405 (register office, 2025). The town is known for its highly regarded wines and being the inspiration for various of Lluís Llach's songs.
