= Torroja del Priorat =

- Municipality
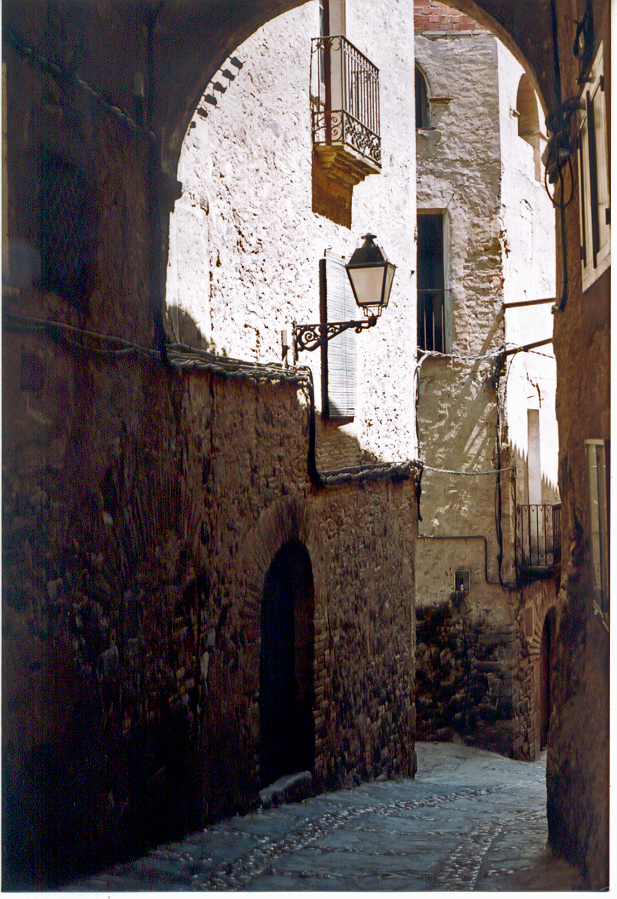
- Street in Torroja

- Coat of arms

- Location in Catalonia
- Coordinates: 41°12′53″N 0°48′45″E
- Country: Spain
- Community: Catalonia
- Province: Tarragona
- Comarca: Priorat

Government
  - Mayor: Montserrat Rosario Abelló (2015)

Area
  - Total: 13.2 km^{2} (5.1 sq mi)
- Elevation: 332 m (1,089 ft)

Population (2025-01-01)
  - Total: 129
  - Density: 9.77/km^{2} (25.3/sq mi)
- Website: torroja.altanet.org

Torroja del Priorat (Catalan pronunciation: [toˈrɔjʒa ðel pɾioˈɾat]) is a village in the province of Tarragona and autonomous community of Catalonia, Spain. It has a population of 129 (register office, 2025).
