= El Molar, Priorat =

El Molar
- Municipality
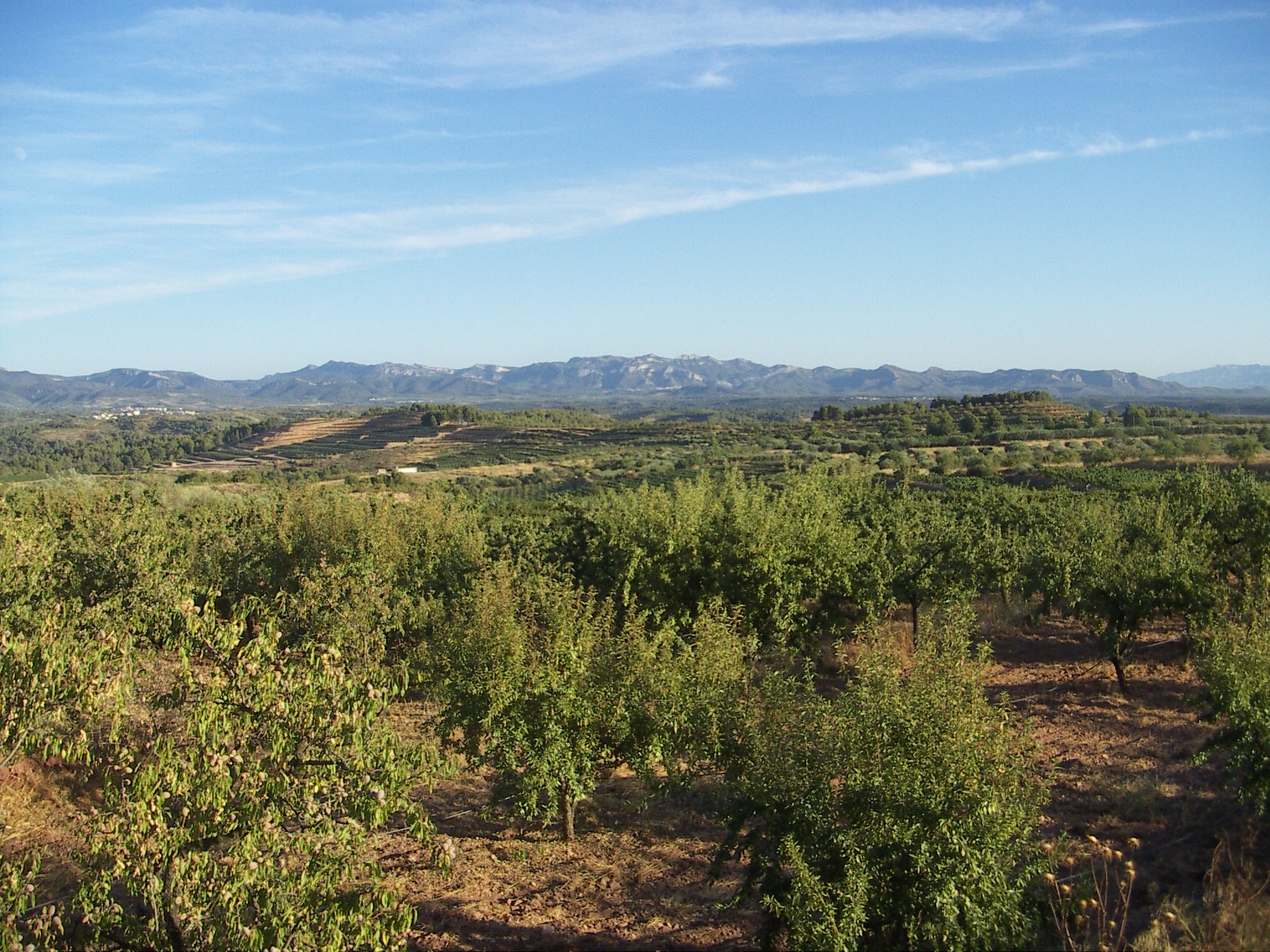
- Cultivated fields near El Molar

- Coat of arms

- Location in Catalonia
- Coordinates: 41°9′56″N 0°42′26″E
- Country: Spain
- Community: Catalonia
- Province: Tarragona
- Comarca: Priorat

Government
  - mayor: Pere Pellejà Llop (2023)

Area
  - Total: 22.8 km^{2} (8.8 sq mi)
- Elevation: 228 m (748 ft)

Population (2025-01-01)
  - Total: 295
  - Density: 12.9/km^{2} (33.5/sq mi)
- Demonym(s): Molarenc, molarenca
- Postal code: 43736
- Website: www.molar.altanet.org

El Molar (Catalan pronunciation: [lo moˈla]) is a municipality in the comarca of Priorat, Tarragona Province, Catalonia, Spain. It has a population of 295 (register office, 2025).

Most of the local economy is based on vineyards, as well as almond and olive tree plantations.

== History ==
Remnants of two ancient villages, the oldest from the 6th or 7th century, are within the El Molar municipal term.

The present village dates from the 13th century after the area had been reconquered from the saracens. During medieval times the town was part of the Barony of Entença. According to an 1156 document by which Ramon Berenguer IV ceded the territory to the Poblet Monastery, El Molar was linked to neighboring Garcia town. This situation ended in the 19th century.

El Molar was bombed by Condor Legion planes during the Spanish Civil War. An abandoned galena mine nearby was used as a field hospital during the Battle of the Ebro.

== Monuments ==
The 18th-century local church is dedicated to Saint Roch (Sant Roc).

== Bibliography ==
- Joan Asens, Guia del Priorat, Tarragona, Edicions de la Llibreria La Rambla, 1981.
- Jordi Tomàs Bonell, Descubrir Catalunya, poble a poble, Premsa Catalana, Barcelona, 1994
