= Neus Català =

Spanish politician (1915–2019)

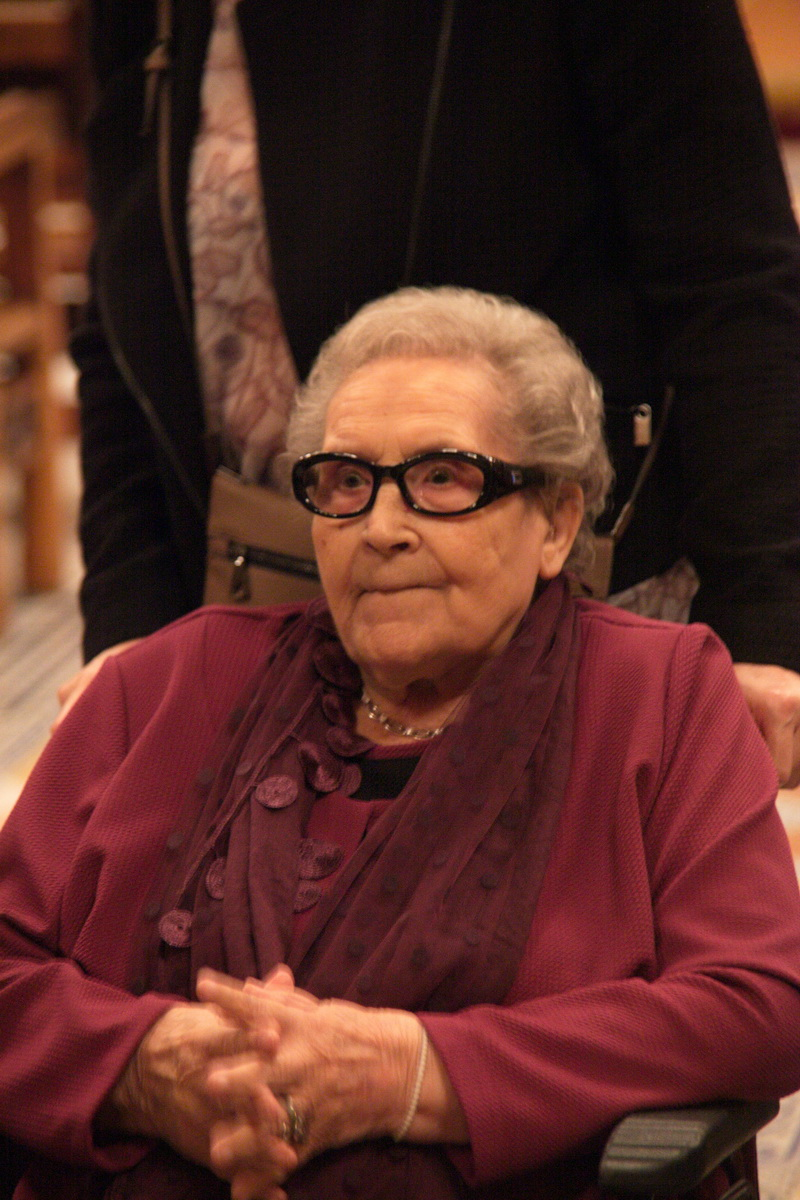
- Català in October 2015
- Born: Neus Català i Pallejà; 6 October 1915; Els Guiamets, Catalonia, Spain
- Died: 13 April 2019 (aged 103); Els Guiamets, Catalonia, Spain
- Occupations: Resistance fighter; political activist
- Known for: Catalan survivor of Ravensbrück concentration camp

Neus Català i Pallejà (Catalan pronunciation: [ˈnews kataˈla j paʎeˈʒa]; 6 October 1915 – 13 April 2019) was a member of the Unified Socialist Party of Catalonia (Catalan: Partit Socialista Unificat de Catalunya, PSUC) during the Spanish Civil War and was a survivor of the concentration camp of Ravensbrück. She was one of many Catalans (both men and women) who survived internment in the Nazi concentration camp system.

== Biography ==
Neus Català was born on 6 October 1915 in Els Guiamets, Tarragona, Catalonia. However, her godmother officially registered her birth on 15 June that year, because of the disappearance of the documentation of the Municipality of Barcelona after the Spanish Civil War. Català moved to Barcelona at the beginning of the Spanish Civil War and obtained her nursing degree.

In 1939, escaping the Francoist forces, she crossed the French border, taking with her 182 orphaned children of the colony Las Acacias from Premià de Dalt, better known as the Children of Negrin, which she later repatriated or arranged to be adopted. While in exile in France, she collaborated with her husband, the Occitan, Albert Roger, in the activities of the French Resistance, centralizing (at her home) the reception and transmission of messages, documents, weapons, and sheltering political refugees. She was reported to the national socialist authorities by a pharmacist of Sarlat. She and her husband were later arrested by the Nazis on 11 November 1943. Català was imprisoned and tortured in Limoges, and in 1944 she was deported to Ravensbrück concentration camp, where she was forced to work in the armaments industry. There, she was part of the "Lazy Commandos" (Spanish: Comando de las gandulas), a group of women who sabotaged the manufacture of weapons in Holleischen, a factory which depended on the concentration camp of Flossenburg. Thanks to sabotage, the facility produced about 10 million faulty bullets and marred numerous weapons making machines. After her release, she returned to France where she married a Spanish exile, Félix Sancho.

Català remained in France continuing her clandestine struggle against Francoist Spain. She lived in Sarcelles, near the city of Paris, and chaired the Association of Victims of Ravensbrück. In 1978, she returned to Catalonia to live in Rubí, Barcelona.

She continued her membership in the Communist Party of Catalonia (PCC), United and Alternative Left (EUiA), and the Pere Ardiaca Foundation, of which she was a member of honor at the time of her death.

With her second husband Sancho, had two children Margarita and Lluís. She died on 13 April 2019, at the age of 103.

== Recognition ==
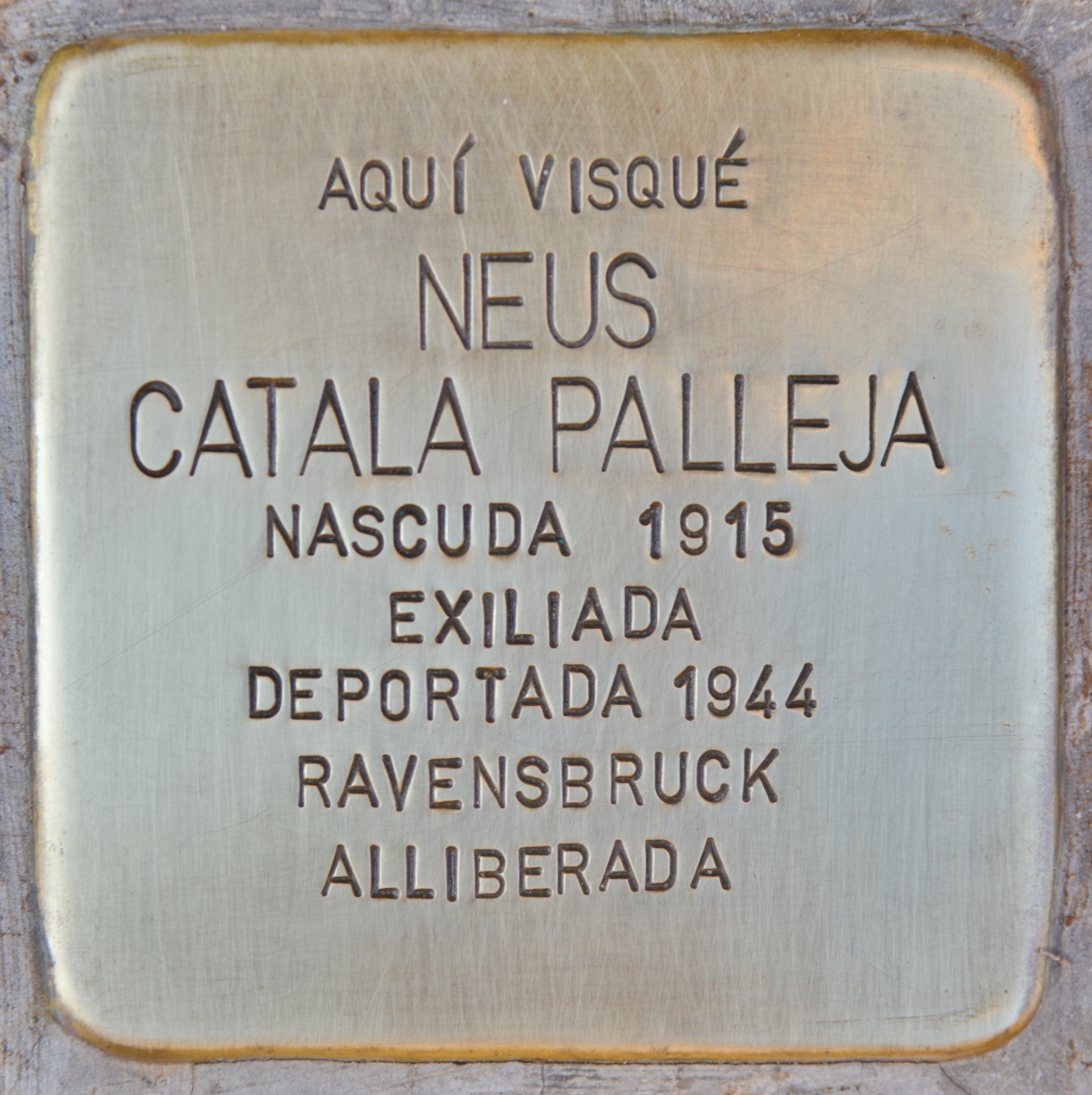
Stolperstein for Neus Català in Els Guiamets

The Generalitat of Catalonia awarded her the Cross of St. George in 2005, and later she was chosen Catalan Person of the Year in 2006 for her defense of the memory of the more than 92,000 women who died in Ravensbrück. In 2006 she also received the Award for Alternative granted by the United and Alternative Left. On 29 October 2014, at the age of 99, the Barcelona City Council awarded Català the Gold Medal of Civic Merit, in recognition for her work to preserve historical memory, the fight against fascism, and the defense of women. In 2015, she received the Gold Medal of the Generalitat of Catalonia, for her struggle for justice and democratic freedom, the memory of those deported to Nazi death camps, and the defense of human rights.

In February 2019, the City of Paris awarded her the 'Grand Vermeil Medal', the highest distinction of the French capital. In July of the same year, the Council of Paris voted unanimously to name a street between the 11th arrondissement and the 20th arrondissement in her memory.

== Neus Català's Year ==
Catalonia dedicated 2015 to the memory of Català, who, about one hundred years old, was the last living person in Spain who survived Ravensbrück. This commemoration paid tribute, by extension, to all those who suffered the consequences of war, the Third Reich, and internment in prison camps and death camps. During the presentation, the Minister of Welfare and Family said, "She is a strong and caring woman, an antifascist fighter, a survivor of the Nazi death camps, and the reference and testimony for all the women who fought in the Spanish Civil War and World War II."

== Bibliography ==
- Català, Neus (2005). De la resistencia y la deportación: 50 testimonios de mujeres españolas [Of resistance and deportation: 50 testimonies of Spanish women]. Barcelona: Memorial Democràtic. ISBN 9788439393436. OCLC 936144680.
- Belenguer Mercadé, Elisenda (2006). Neus Català: memòria i lluita. Barcelona: Debarris. ISBN 978-84-935342-0-2. OCLC 803461366.
- Mar Trallero, "Neus Català: la mujer antifascista en Europa", Barcelona, Mina, 2008, ISBN 978-84-96499-94-2
- Carme Martí, Un cel de plom (novela), Barcelona: Amsterdam llibres, 2012. ISBN 978-84-15224-51-8
- Carme Martí, Cenizas en el cielo (novela, traducción de Un cel de plom): Roca Editorial, 2012. ISBN 978-84-9918-455-5
- Material gràfic de Neus Català sobre la Guerra Civil Espanyola, l'Alemanya nazi i els camps de concentració 1933-2006. Barcelona : CRAI Biblioteca del Pavelló de la República, 2006.
