= Pradell de la Teixeta =

- Municipality
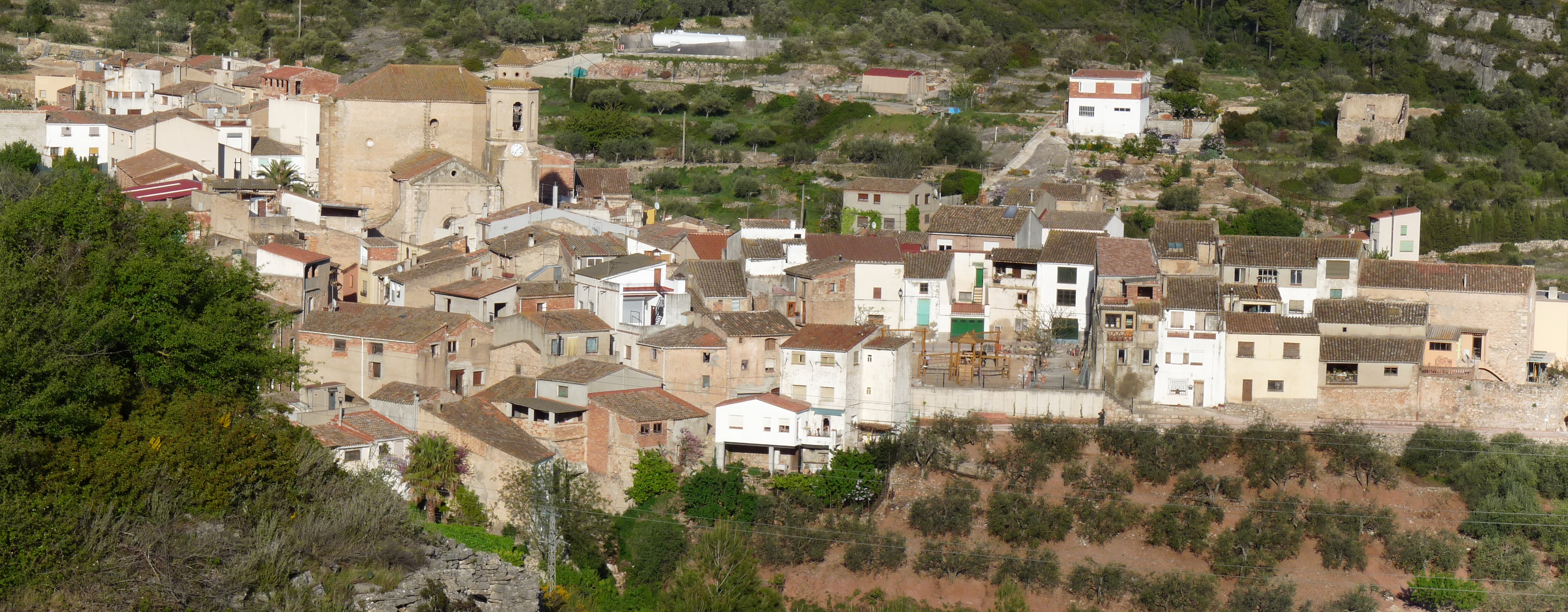

- Coat of arms

- Location in Catalonia
- Coordinates: 41°09′24″N 0°52′34″E
- Country: Spain
- Community: Catalonia
- Province: Tarragona
- Comarca: Priorat

Government
  - Mayor: Maria Mar Amorós Mas (2015)

Area
  - Total: 21.8 km^{2} (8.4 sq mi)
- Elevation: 463 m (1,519 ft)

Population (2025-01-01)
  - Total: 182
- Website: pradelldelateixeta.cat

Pradell de la Teixeta (Catalan pronunciation: [pɾəˈðeʎ ðə lə təjˈʃɛtə]) is a municipality in Catalonia, Spain, located in the comarca of Priorat, in the province of Tarragona. It has a population of 182 (register office, 2025).
