= Ulldemolins =

- Municipality
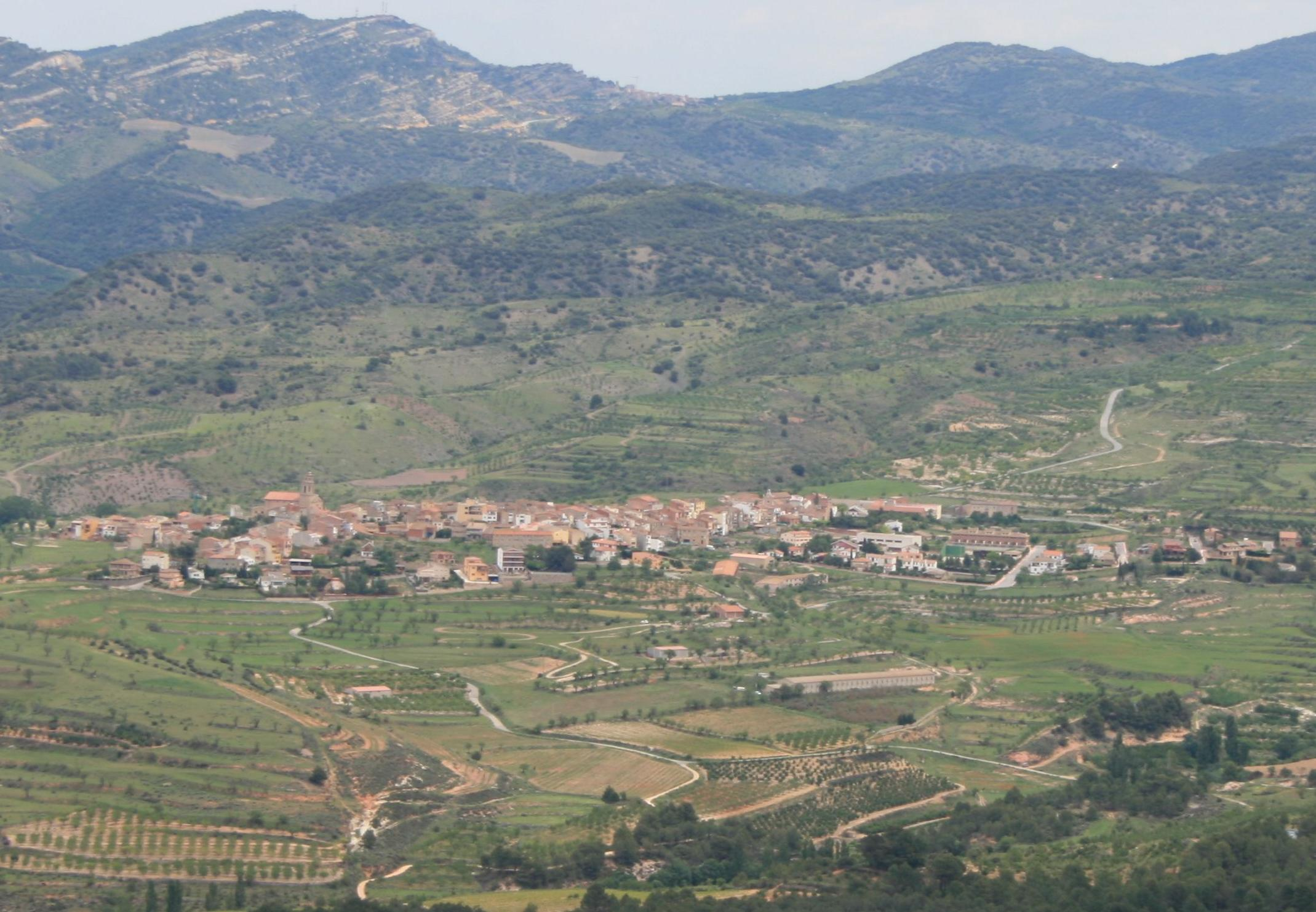

- Flag Coat of arms

- Location in Catalonia
- Coordinates: 41°19′25″N 0°52′39″E
- Country: Spain
- Community: Catalonia
- Province: Tarragona
- Comarca: Priorat

Government
  - Mayor: Misericòrdia Montlleó Domènech (2015)

Area
  - Total: 38.2 km^{2} (14.7 sq mi)
- Elevation: 481 m (1,578 ft)

Population (2025-01-01)
  - Total: 389
  - Density: 10.2/km^{2} (26.4/sq mi)
- Demonym: Ulldemolinenc
- Postal code: 43363
- Website: ulldemolins.cat

Ulldemolins (Catalan pronunciation: [ˌuʎðemoˈlins]) is a municipality in the comarca of the Priorat in Catalonia, Spain. It has a population of 389 (register office, 2025).

This town is located among rocky mountains, the Serra de la Llena, the Serra de Montsant and the Prades Mountains.

== History ==
In medieval times the town was part of the Barony of Entença.
