= La Vilella Baixa =

- Municipality
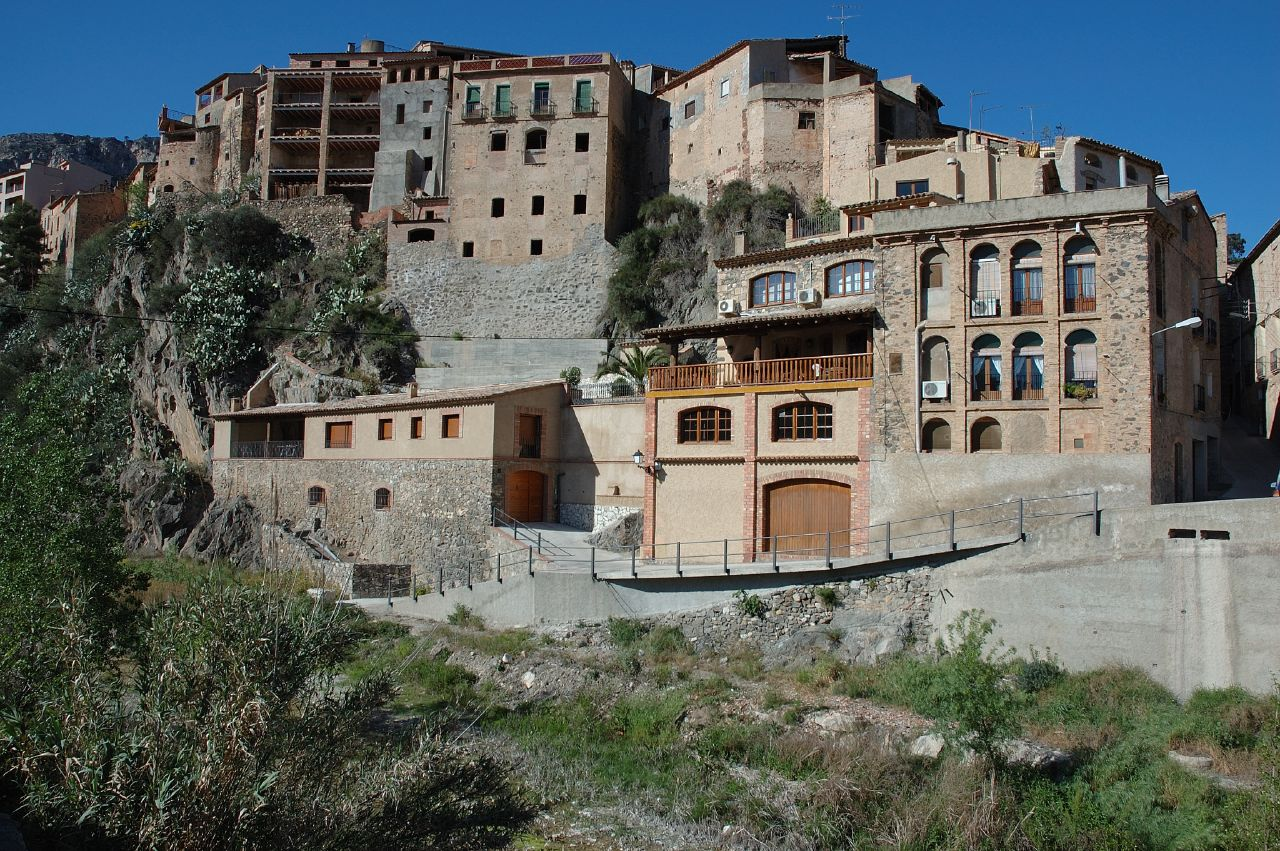
- La Vilella Baixa

- Coat of arms

- Location in Catalonia
- Coordinates: 41°13′21″N 0°45′49″E
- Country: Spain
- Community: Catalonia
- Province: Tarragona
- Comarca: Priorat

Government
  - Mayor: Jordi Sabaté Gàsquez (2015)

Area
  - Total: 5.6 km^{2} (2.2 sq mi)

Population (2025-01-01)
  - Total: 201
  - Density: 36/km^{2} (93/sq mi)
- Website: www.vilellabaixa.altanet.org

La Vilella Baixa (Catalan pronunciation: [la viˈleʎa ˈβajʃa]) is a village in the province of Tarragona and autonomous community of Catalonia, Spain. It has a population of 201 (register office, 2025).
