= La Torre de Fontaubella =

- Municipality
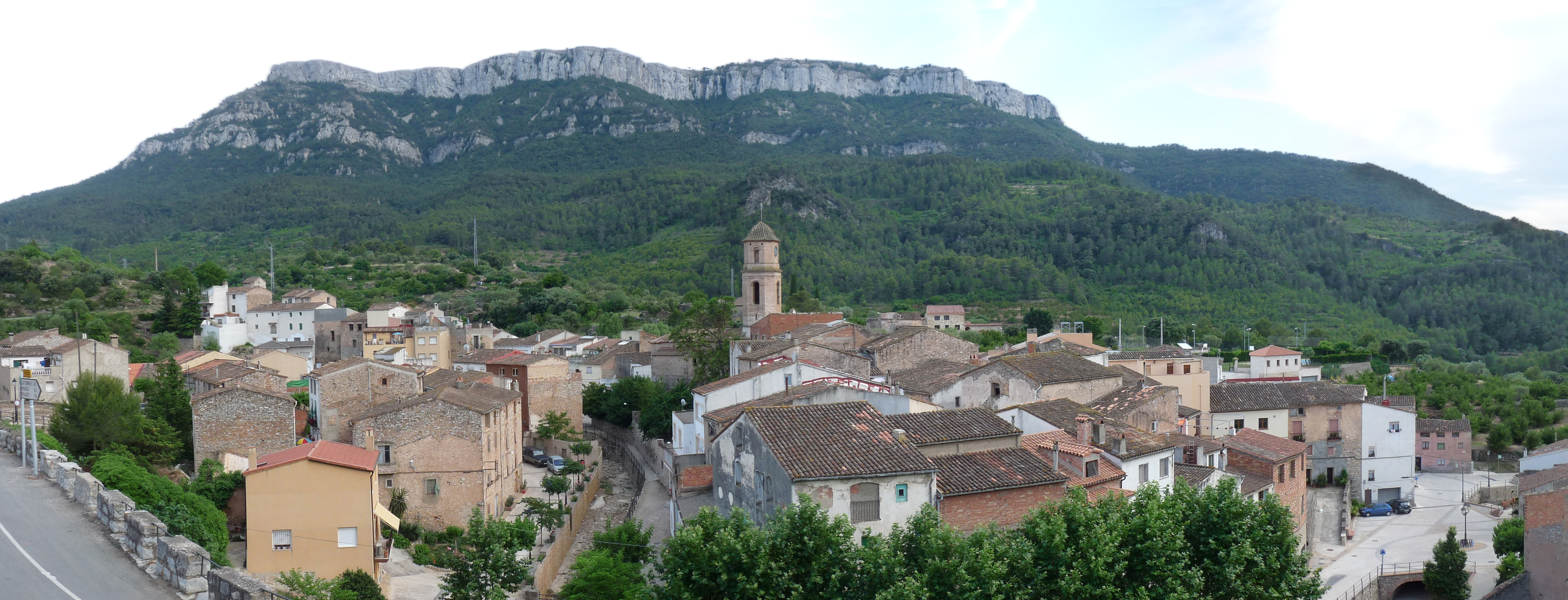
- North face of Mola de Colldejou rising above La Torre de Fontaubella

- Flag Coat of arms

- Location in Catalonia
- Coordinates: 41°07′34″N 0°51′56″E
- Country: Spain
- Community: Catalonia
- Province: Tarragona
- Comarca: Priorat

Government
  - Mayor: Jaume Rofes Anglés (2015)

Area
  - Total: 7.1 km^{2} (2.7 sq mi)
- Elevation: 369 m (1,211 ft)

Population (2025-01-01)
  - Total: 124
  - Density: 17/km^{2} (45/sq mi)
- Demonym(s): Torretà, Torretana
- Website: www.torredefontaubella.altanet.org

La Torre de Fontaubella (Catalan pronunciation: [la ˈtore ðe ˌfɔntawˈβeʎa]) is a municipality in the comarca of the Priorat in Catalonia, Spain. It is situated at the southeastern end of the comarca.

== Demographics ==
It has a population of 124 (register office, 2025).

1900	1930	1950	1970	1986	2007
255	156	135	114	n/a	147

== Bibliography ==
- Panareda Clopés, Josep Maria; Rios Calvet, Jaume; Rabella Vives, Josep Maria (1989). Guia de Catalunya, Barcelona: Caixa de Catalunya. ISBN 84-87135-01-3 (Spanish). ISBN 84-87135-02-1 (Catalan).
