= Cabassers =

- Municipality
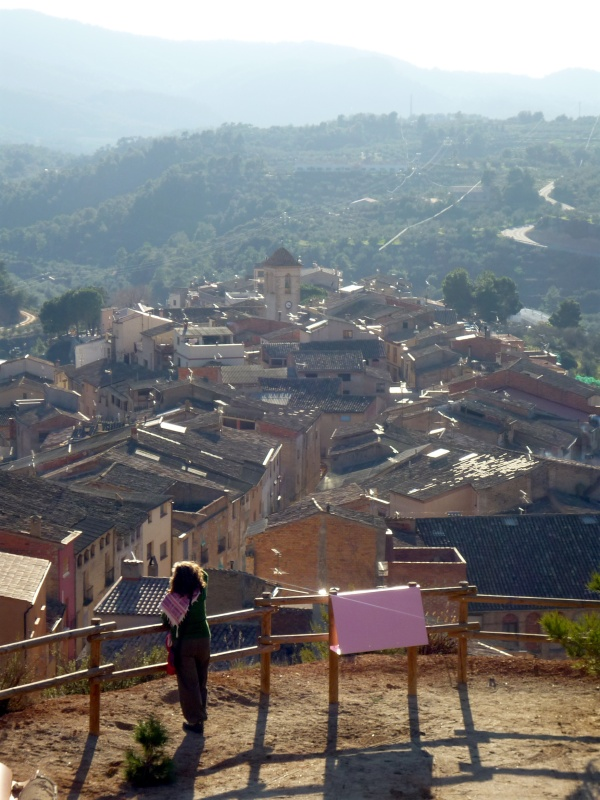
- Cabassers

- Coat of arms

- Location in Catalonia
- Coordinates: 41.247°N 0.733°E
- Country: Spain
- Community: Catalonia
- Province: Tarragona
- Comarca: Priorat

Government
  - Mayor: Jaume-Josep Pujals Pujals (2026)

Area
  - Total: 31.3 km^{2} (12.1 sq mi)

Population (2025-01-01)
  - Total: 296
  - Density: 9.46/km^{2} (24.5/sq mi)
- Website: www.cabaces.altanet.org

Cabassers (Catalan pronunciation: [kaβaˈses]) is a municipality in the comarca of Priorat in the province of Tarragona, Catalonia, Spain. It has a population of 296 (register office, 2025).

First known as Cabassers, it was known as Cabacés from 1989 until 2024, when the original spelling that conforms to catalan spelling was used again.
