= Vilanova de Prades =

- Municipality
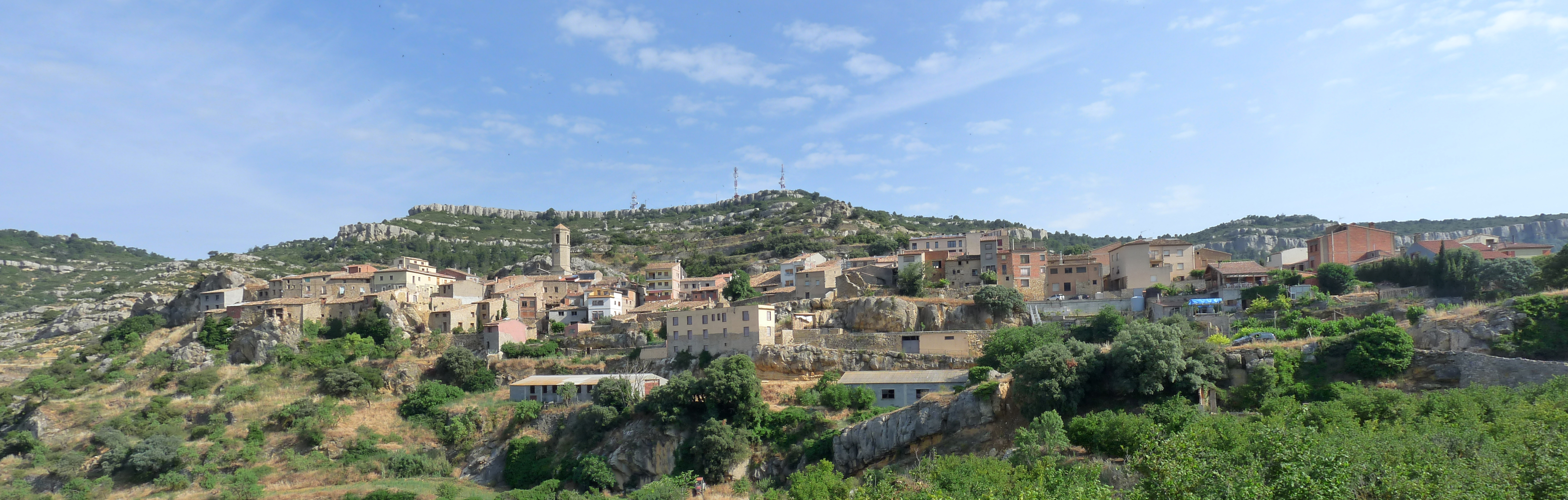

- Flag Coat of arms

- Location in Spain Vilanova de Prades (Spain)
- Coordinates: 41°21′0″N 0°57′31″E
- Country: Spain
- Autonomous community: Catalonia
- Province: Tarragona
- Comarca: Conca de Barberà

Government
  - mayor: Artur Miró Palau (2015)

Area
  - Total: 21.5 km^{2} (8.3 sq mi)
- Elevation: 893 m (2,930 ft)

Population (2025-01-01)
  - Total: 111
  - Density: 5.16/km^{2} (13.4/sq mi)
- Demonym(s): Vilanoví, vilanovina
- Postal code: 43439
- Website: www.vprades.altanet.org

Vilanova de Prades (Catalan pronunciation: [ˌvilaˈnɔva ðe ˈpɾaðes]) is a municipality in the comarca of Conca de Barberà, in the province of Tarragona, Catalonia, Spain. It is a popular holiday resort located at high altitude atop the Serra de la Llena, close to the area where this mountain range meets the Prades Mountains. It has a population of 111 (register office, 2025).

== History ==
The town appears mentioned for the first time in an 1159 document regarding the limits of Prades. The main monuments are Sant Salvador church in the centre, as well as the Sant Antoni de Pàdua shrine at the edge of the town.

== Bibliography ==
- Tomàs Bonell, Jordi; Descobrir Catalunya, poble a poble, Prensa Catalana, Barcelona, 1994
