= Carrer d'Entença, Barcelona =

Street in Barcelona, Catalonia, Spain

Coordinates: 41.3830°N 2.1461°E

Carrer d'Entença (official Catalan name; known in Spanish as Calle Entenza) is a street in Barcelona, situated in the left half (Esquerra de l'Eixample) of the Eixample district's grid plan. It's named after House of Entença nobleman Berenguer d'Entença i Montcada, who captained a number of expeditions towards the East in the 13th century. The naming was approved on December 19, 1863, and was already plan of Ildefons Cerdà's urban plan, even though under the tentative name of "15th street". In 1925 it was extended, reaching Avinguda Diagonal, beyond which it becomes Carrer del Doctor Fleming.

== Transportation ==
There is a Barcelona Metro station called Rocafort, located on the crossing of this street with Gran Via de les Corts Catalanes. The upper part of the street can be accessed from Entença metro station.

== See also ==
- List of streets in Eixample

== Bibliography ==
- Enciclopèdia Catalana (2005), Enciclopèdia de Barcelona, Vol. 2. ISBN 84-412-1396-8.
