= Villella =

Villella is a surname. Notable people with the surname include:

- Ann Villella, American voice actress
- Chad Villella (born 1977), American actor, writer, producer, and director
- Davide Villella (born 1991), Italian cyclist
- Edward Villella (born 1936), American ballet dancer and choreographer
- Michael Villella (1940–2024), American film and television actor

See also:

- Vilela
- Vilella
- Villela
