= La Bisbal de Montsant =

- Municipality
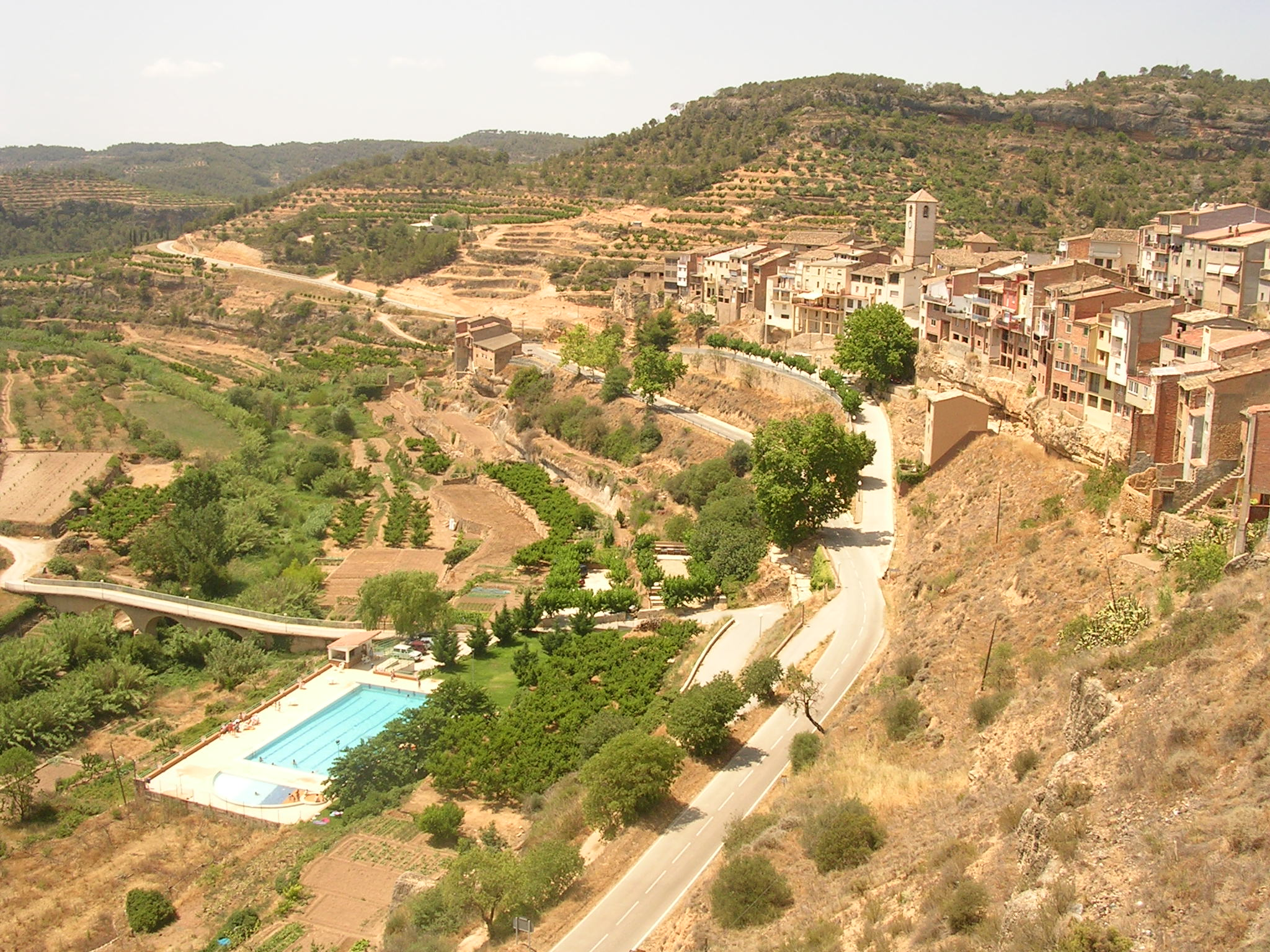

- Coat of arms

- Location in Catalonia
- Coordinates: 41°16′55″N 0°43′27″E
- Country: Spain
- Community: Catalonia
- Province: Tarragona
- Comarca: Priorat

Government
  - Mayor: Sergi Masip (2015)

Area
  - Total: 14.1 km^{2} (5.4 sq mi)
- Elevation: 372 m (1,220 ft)

Population (2025-01-01)
  - Total: 214
  - Density: 15.2/km^{2} (39.3/sq mi)
- Demonym: Bisbalenc
- Postal code: 43372
- Climate: Csa
- Website: www.labisbaldefalset.altanet.org

La Bisbal de Montsant (Catalan pronunciation: [la βizˈbal de monˈsan]) is a municipality in the comarca of the Priorat in Catalonia, Spain. It has a population of 214 (register office, 2025).

The economy is mostly based on agriculture, with production of olives and olive oil.
