= Bellmunt del Priorat =

- Municipality
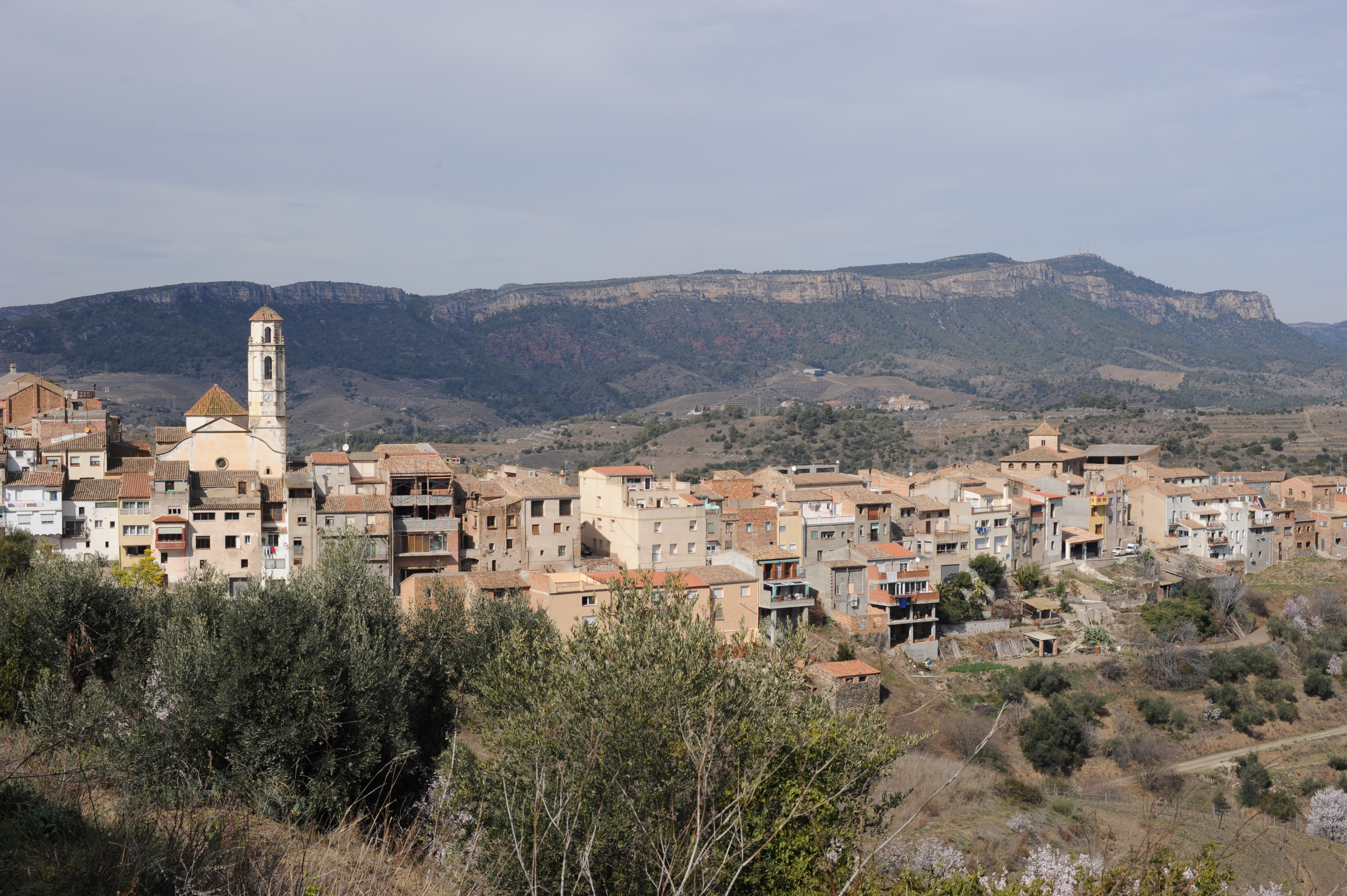

- Coat of arms

- Location in Catalonia
- Coordinates: 41.163°N 0.766°E
- Country: Spain
- Community: Catalonia
- Province: Tarragona
- Comarca: Priorat

Government
  - Mayor: Josep Maria Torné Secall (2015)

Area
  - Total: 8.9 km^{2} (3.4 sq mi)

Population (2025-01-01)
  - Total: 290
  - Density: 33/km^{2} (84/sq mi)
- Website: www.bellmunt.altanet.org

Bellmunt del Priorat (Catalan pronunciation: [ˌbeʎˈmun del pɾioˈɾat]) is a municipality in the comarca of Priorat, Tarragona, Catalonia, Spain. It has a population of 290 (register office, 2025).

Much like the rest of the comarca, Bellmunt has very active wine production, although the climate is one of the warmest to be found.
