= Marçà =

- Municipality
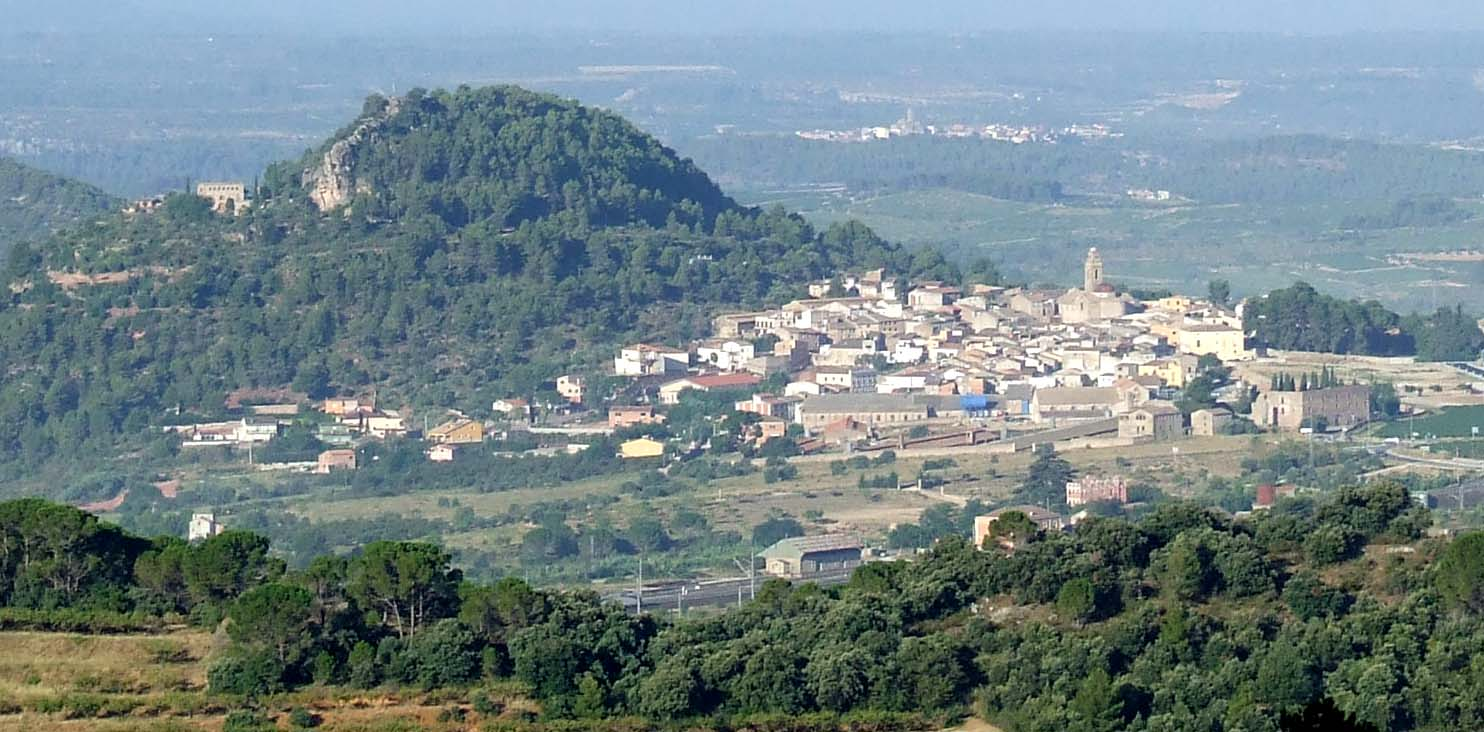

- Coat of arms

- Location in Catalonia
- Coordinates: 41°7′43″N 0°48′13″E
- Country: Spain
- Community: Catalonia
- Province: Tarragona
- Comarca: Priorat

Government
  - mayor: Josep Maria Piqué Castellnou (2019)

Area
  - Total: 16.1 km^{2} (6.2 sq mi)
- Elevation: 315 m (1,033 ft)

Population (2021)
  - Total: 612
  - Density: 38.0/km^{2} (98.5/sq mi)
- Demonym(s): Marçalenc, marçalenca
- Postal code: 43775
- Website: www.marca.altanet.org

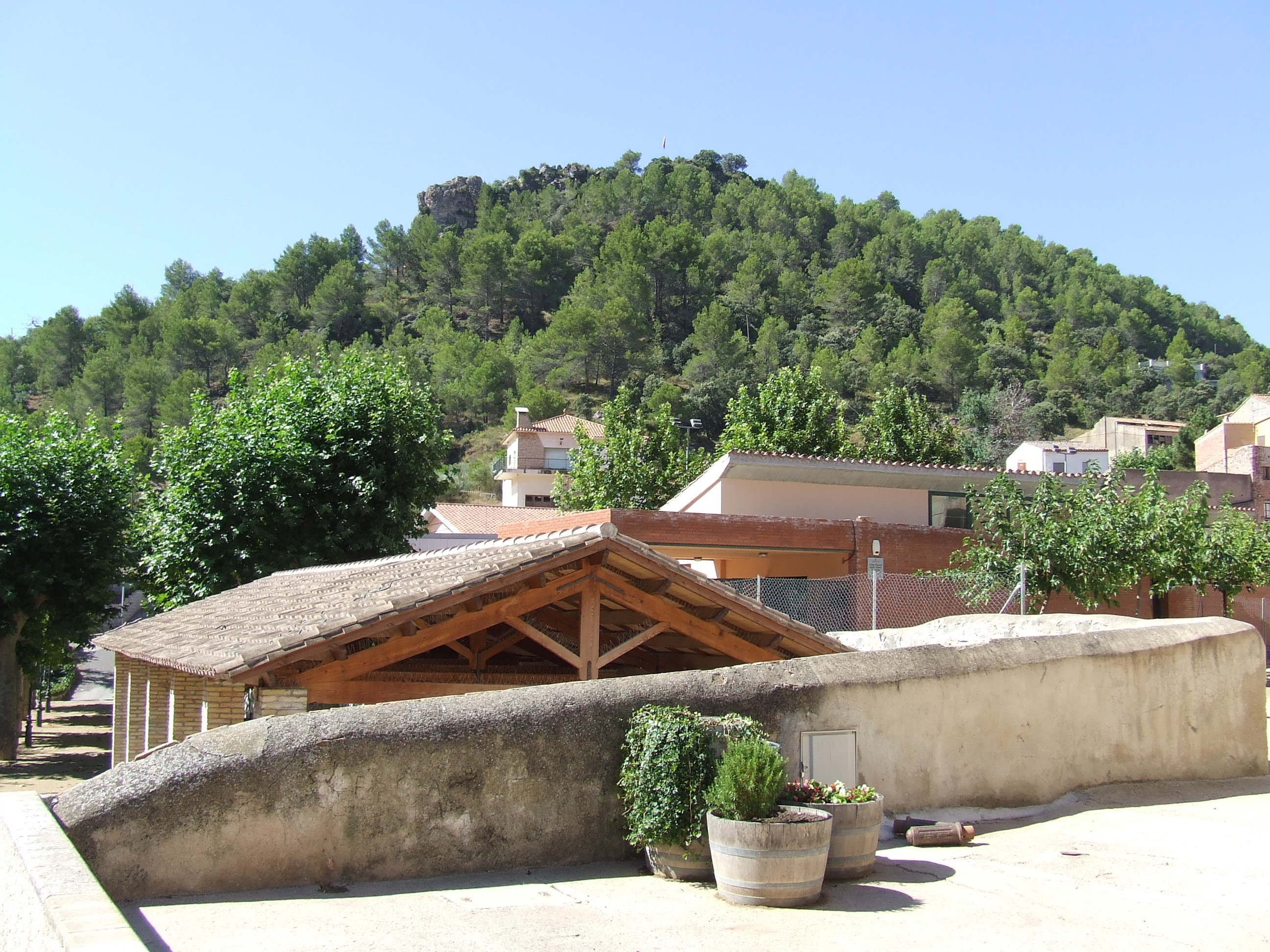
La Miloquera mountain in Marçà

Marçà (Catalan pronunciation: [maɾˈsa]) is a municipality in the comarca of Priorat, Tarragona Province, Catalonia, Spain. It has a population of 623 (register office, 2025).

== History ==
In medieval times, after the area had been reconquered from the Saracens, the town became part of the Barony of Entença.

The now ruined Sant Marçal monastery was founded in 1611. It was closed down due to the Ecclesiastical Confiscations of Mendizábal in 1835 during Isabella II of Spain's rule. The Desamortización or secularization of the place brought monastic life in the monastery to an end.

Despite having lost almost half of its population since 1900, nowadays Marçà is the third most important town in the Priorat comarca.

== Villages ==
- Les Comes, 42
- Marçà, 559
- El Verinxell, 20

== Monuments ==
The 18th century Santa Maria church.

== Bibliography ==
- Joan Asens, Guia del Priorat, Tarragona, Edicions de la Llibreria La Rambla, 1981.
- Josep Maria Gavin, Inventari d'esglésies 1. Montsià, Baix Ebre, Terra Alta, Ribera d'Ebre, Priorat, Matarranya, Barcelona, Arxiu Gavín, 1977
- Ezequiel Gort Juanpere, Història de Falset, Barcelona, Rafael Dalmau, Editor, 2003.
- Rafel Queixalós i Fucho, Marçà, reculls de la seva història, Falset, Arts Gràfiques Octavi, 1982.
