= Vilela =

Vilela may refer to:

- Vilela (Amares), a parish (freguesia) in Amares municipality, Portugal
- Vilela (Póvoa de Lanhoso), a parish (freguesia) in Póvoa de Lanhoso municipality, Portugal
- Vilela language, an endangered Lule-Vilela language, indigenous to northwestern Argentina
- Vilela people, indigenous people of Argentina
- Amy Vilela (born 1974 or 1975), American politician
- João Vilela (born 1985), Portuguese footballer
- José Luis Vilela de Acuña (born 1953), Cuban chess master
- Ivan Vilela (born 1962), Brazilian musician and composer

See also:

- Villela
- Vilella
- Villella
