= El Masroig =

- Municipality
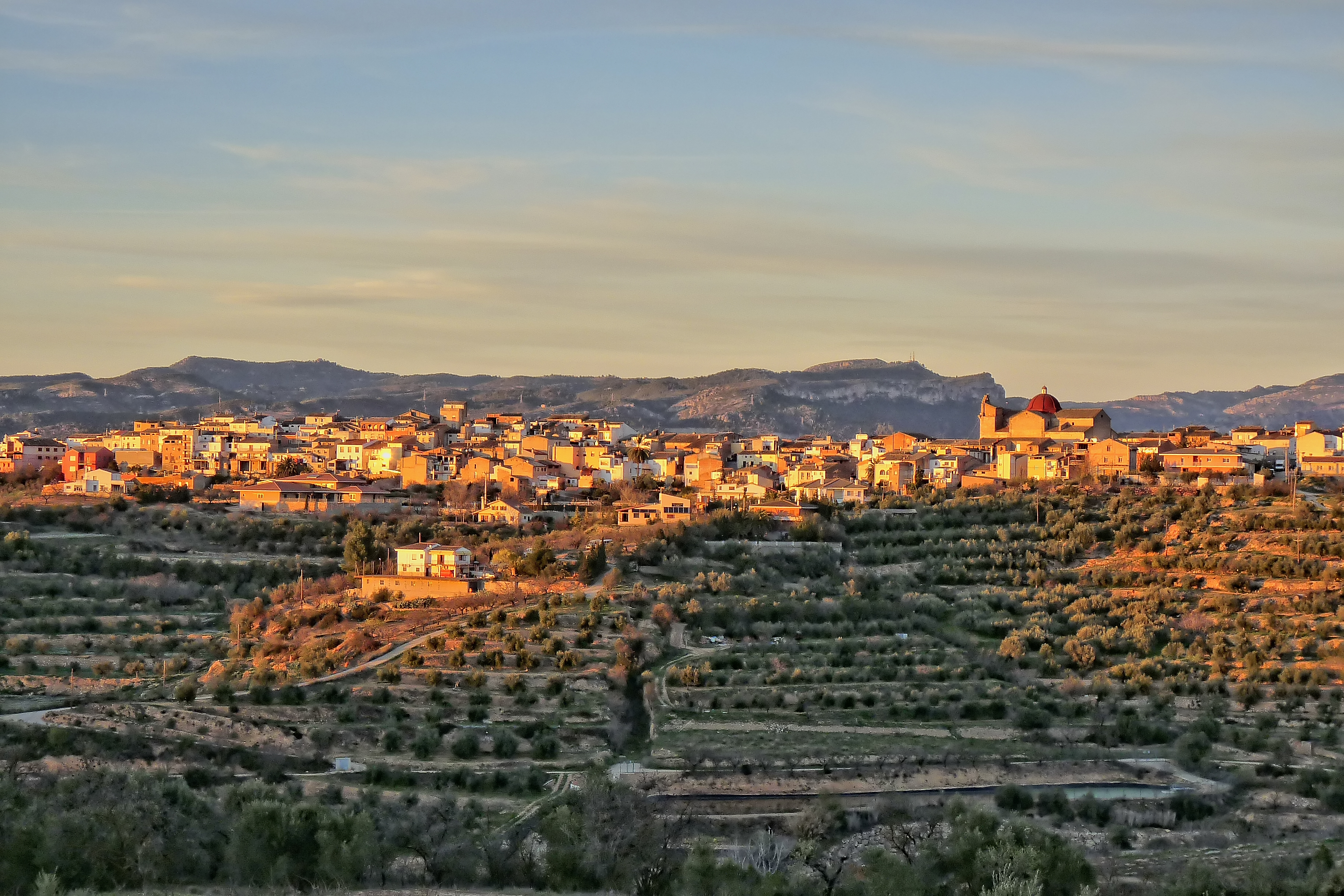
- El Masroig

- Coat of arms

- Location in Catalonia
- Coordinates: 41°7′41″N 0°44′1″E
- Country: Spain
- Community: Catalonia
- Province: Tarragona
- Comarca: Priorat

Government
  - Mayor: Josep Rius Vallès (2015)

Area
  - Total: 15.5 km^{2} (6.0 sq mi)

Population (2025-01-01)
  - Total: 473
  - Density: 30.5/km^{2} (79.0/sq mi)
- Website: www.masroig.altanet.org

El Masroig (Catalan pronunciation: [el maˈrɔtʃ]; locally [lo maˈrɔtʃ]) is a village in the province of Tarragona and autonomous community of Catalonia, Spain. It has a population of 473 (register office, 2025).
