= La Vilella Alta =

- Municipality
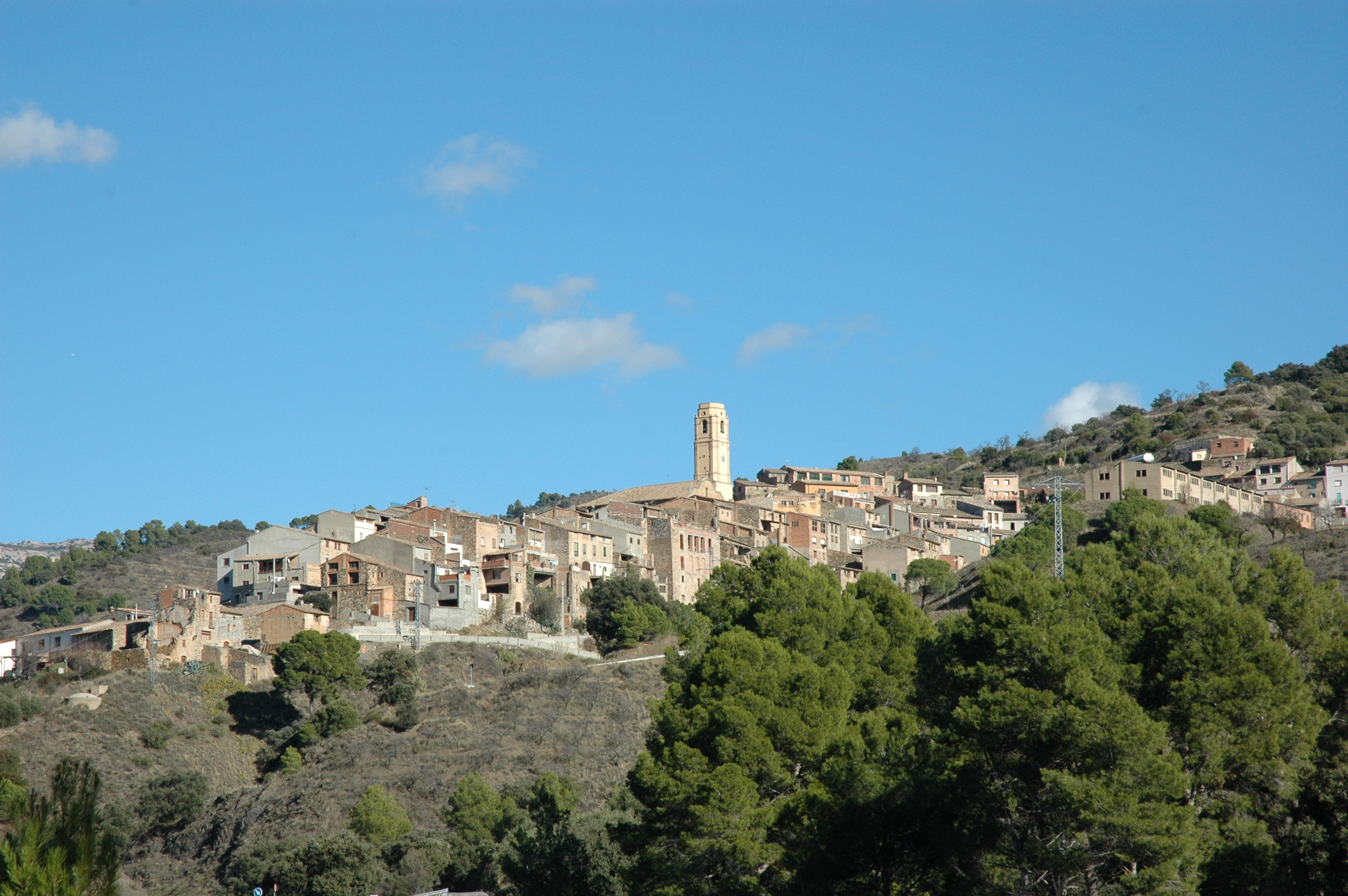

- Coat of arms

- Location in Catalonia and Spain La Vilella Alta (Spain)
- Coordinates: 41°13′38″N 0°46′53″E
- Country: Spain
- Community: Catalonia
- Province: Tarragona
- Comarca: Priorat

Government
  - Mayor: Marc Vinyes Verge (2015)

Area
  - Total: 5.2 km^{2} (2.0 sq mi)

Population (2025-01-01)
  - Total: 127
  - Density: 24/km^{2} (63/sq mi)
- Website: www.vilellaalta.altanet.org

La Vilella Alta (Catalan pronunciation: [la viˈleʎalta]) is a village in the province of Tarragona and autonomous community of Catalonia, Spain. It has a population of 127 (register office, 2025).
