= La Figuera =

- Municipality
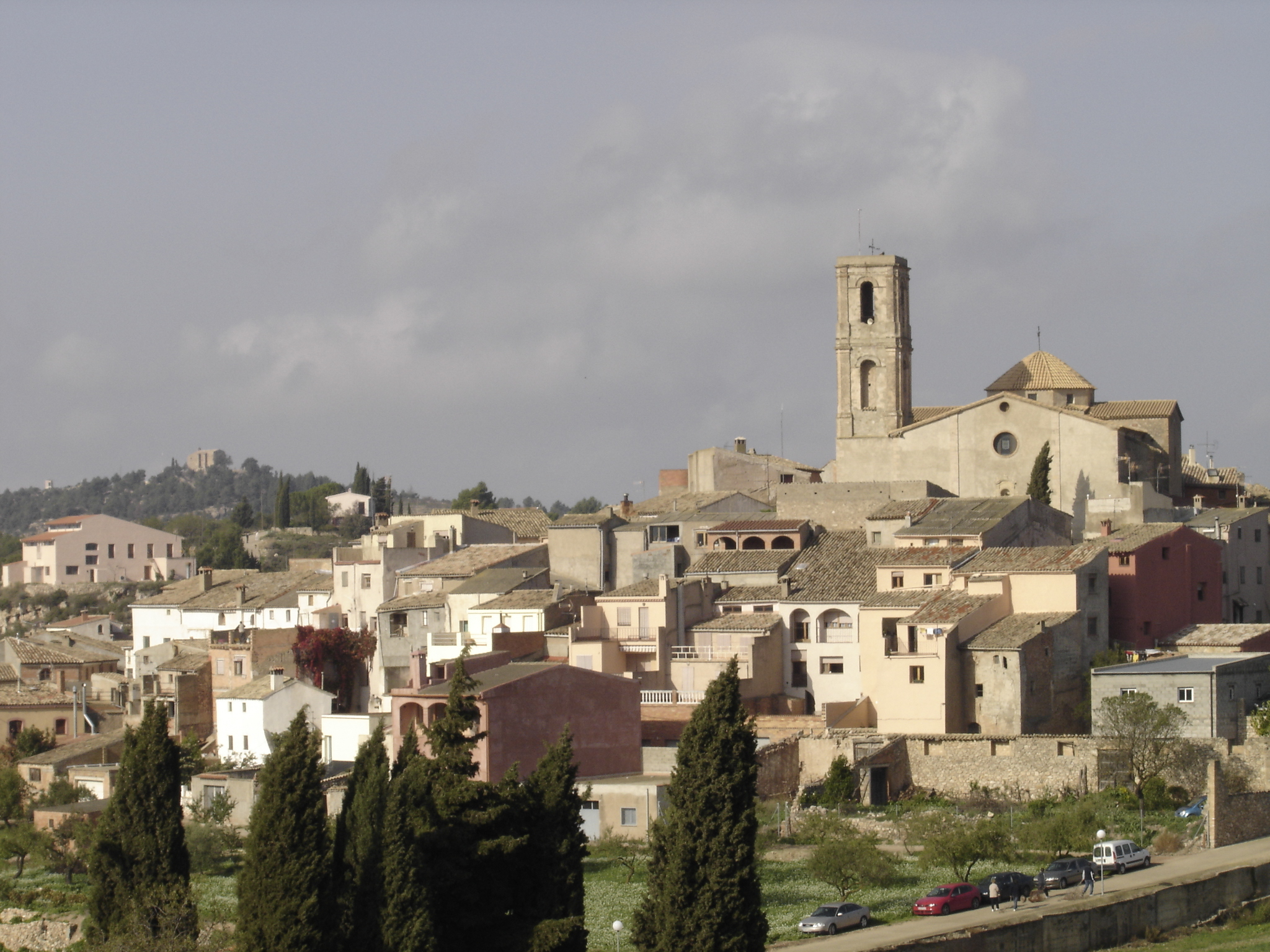

- Coat of arms

- Location in Catalonia
- Coordinates: 41°13′4″N 0°43′56″E
- Country: Spain
- Community: Catalonia
- Province: Tarragona
- Comarca: Priorat

Government
  - Mayor: Josep Maria Porqueres Giral (2015)

Area
  - Total: 18.7 km^{2} (7.2 sq mi)
- Elevation: 575 m (1,886 ft)

Population (2025-01-01)
  - Total: 115
  - Density: 6.15/km^{2} (15.9/sq mi)
- Demonym(s): Figuerenc, figuerenca
- Website: www.figuera.altanet.org

La Figuera (Catalan pronunciation: [la fiˈɣeɾa]) is a town in Priorat, Catalonia, Spain. It has a population of 115 (register office, 2025) with an altitude of 575 meters and an extension of 18.75 km^{2}. Vineyard and olive tree are predominant in the scenery.

From the hermitage of Sant Pau it is said that lands of seven provinces can be seen.
