= House of Entença =

- noble family
- Country: Crown of Aragon
- Founded: 11th century
- Founder: Berenguer d'Entença
- Titles: Baron of Entença; Baron of Castellvell; Countess of Urgell; Viscountess of Àger

The House of Entença was an ancient and noble dynasty of the Crown of Aragon.

== History ==
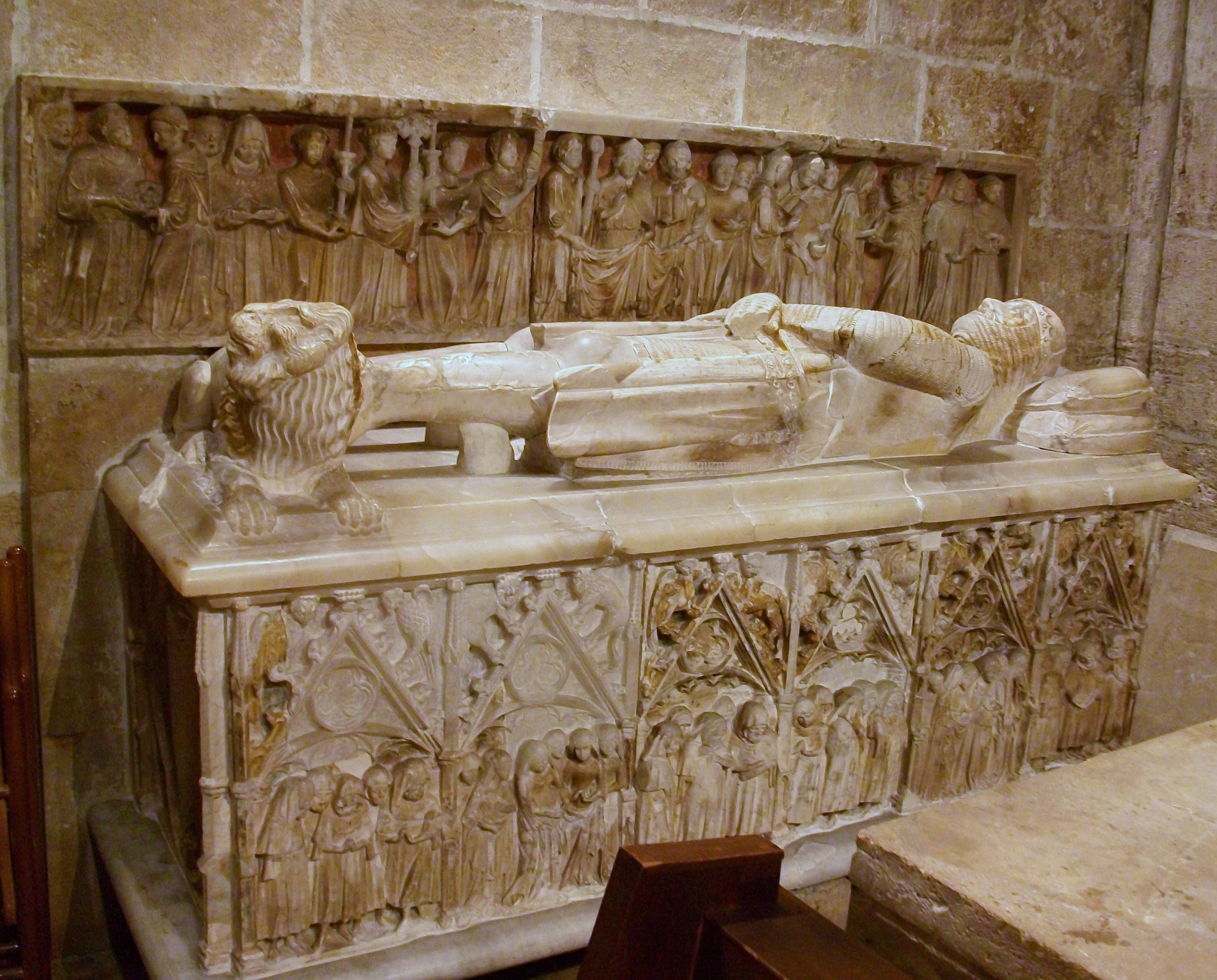
Sepulchre of Bernat Guillem d'Entença at the El Puig monastery.

The Entença noble family originated in the town of Entença in La Franja, presently in Aragon, around the 11th century.

Later, in the 13th century the Barony of Entença was established in the Priorat and Ribera d'Ebre areas that had been conquered to the saracens and needed repopulation. Further south, the Barons of Entença shared the lordship over Tortosa in Baix Ebre.

By 1313 William II of Entença was deeply in debt and decided to donate the Barony of Entença to king James II of Aragon. King James II waited until William's death to take possession of the Barony. Thus, in 1324 King James II annexed the Barony of Entença to the County of Prades, which he established for his son Ramon Berenguer. In this manner the dominions of the Barons of Entença became part of the County of Prades. In 1414 Joana de Prades inherited the Barony of Entença. Following her marriage to Joan Folch de Cardona, the lineage of Entença merged with the viscounts of Cardona.

The ruins of the Casa de la Reina Teresa d'Entença can still be seen in Entença village, close to Benavarri.

Because of the historical significance of this bloodline, streets or squares named 'Entença' or 'Entenza' are common in towns and villages throughout Catalonia, the Valencian Community and the Balearic Islands. Also some present-day municipalities —such as Vandellòs i l'Hospitalet de l'Infant, Marçà, Cornudella de Montsant and Ulldemolins, among others— have kept the heraldic colors of the ancient House of Entença in their coats of arms.

== Members of the House of Entença ==
Among the foremost members of the Entença family, the following deserve mention (names in Catalan):

- Jessiana d'Entença (12th century), Lady of Alcolea de Cinca and wife of Hug III d'Empúries
- Alamanda I d'Entença (1205-1244), Lady of the Barony of Castellvell (later Barony of Entença)
- Alamanda II d'Entença (1244-1246), also known as Alamanda la Jove, Baroness of Castellvell (later Barony of Entença)
- Jussiana d'Entença (13th century), wife of Bernat Guillem de Montpeller
- Bernat Guillem de Montpeller (?-1235), also known as Bernat Guillem I d'Entença, Lord of Fraga, died at the Battle of the Puig in 1237.
- Bernat Guillem d'Entença (13th century), also known as Bernat Guillem II d'Entença, son of Bernat Guillem of Montpeller and his wife Jussiana d'Entença, and brother of Bernat Guillem d'Entença.
- Guillem de Montpeller Entença (13th century), Catalan nobleman, son of Bernat Guillem de Montpeller and his wife Jussiana d'Entença, brother of Bernat Guillem d'Entença
- Berenguer, fifth Baron of Entença or Berenguer d'Entença i Santmartí-Castellvell (?-1294), was one of the sons of Berenguer d'Entença i Santmartí-Castellvell.
- William II of Entença or Guillem d'Entença i Montcada (1294-1321), Baron of Entença
- Berenguer d'Entença i de Montcada, Catalan nobleman and commander-in-chief of the Catalan Company (13th century)
- Teresa d'Entença, Countess of Urgell and Viscountess of Àger, wife of King Alfons IV of Aragon
- Saurina d'Entença, wife of admiral Roger de Llúria
- Giussiana Ximenes d'Entença Luesia, wife of Valencian nobleman Blasco II d'Alagón

== See also ==
- Entença
