= Priorat =

Coordinates: 41°08′N 0°49′E

- Comarca
- Coat of arms

- Country: Spain
- Autonomous community: Catalonia
- Region: Camp de Tarragona
- Province: Tarragona
- Capital: Falset
- Municipalities: List: Bellmunt del Priorat, La Bisbal de Montsant, Cabacés, Capçanes, Cornudella de Montsant, Falset, La Figuera, Gratallops, Els Guiamets, El Lloar, Margalef, Marçà, El Masroig, El Molar, La Morera de Montsant, Poboleda, Porrera, Pradell de la Teixeta, Siurana (Tarragona), La Torre de Fontaubella, Torroja del Priorat, Ulldemolins, La Vilella Alta, La Vilella Baixa

Government
  - Body: Priorat Comarcal Council
  - President: Sergi Méndez (ERC)

Area
  - Total: 498.61 km^{2} (192.51 sq mi)

Population (2017)
  - Total: 9,345
  - Density: 18.74/km^{2} (48.54/sq mi)
- Demonym(s): Prioratí, prioratina
- Time zone: UTC+1 (CET)
  - Summer (DST): UTC+2 (CEST)
- Largest municipality: Falset

Priorat (Western Catalan: [pɾi.oˈɾat]) is a comarca (county) in Camp de Tarragona, Catalonia, Spain. The region is named due to the monastery of Scala Dei which held many properties and the capital is now the town of Falset.

== Economy ==
The central part of the comarca, Priorat històric, produces the highly regarded wines that are certified under the DOQ Priorat. Wines from elsewhere in the comarca are certified as DO Montsant although this region also has a small segment of the neighboring comarca, Ribera d'Ebre. However, galena mining was the main activity since prehistoric times until 1972, when the last galena mine closed.

The other main agricultural activity is the production of olives and olive oil, the latter of which is certified under DOP Siurana. Historically there was greater production of hazelnuts and almonds but these activities have become mostly for personal use. In late 1800s, a devastating attack of the insect phylloxera destroyed vines and mining kept activities and around twenty mines opened at that time.

Priorat saw a steady loss of population throughout the 20th century due to a number of external factors such as the Spanish Civil War and the rise of coastal tourism. In 2004, with a more prosperous economy there was an overall increase in population that peaked in 2010 and has since been decreasing again each year. In 2001, the population was 9,196, with only the capital exceeding a population of 1,000 and while it has over 2,800 residents as of 2017, the comarca overall has reduced to 9,345 from a high of 10,145 making it the 3rd least populated comarca in all of Catalonia.

== Physical geography ==
Priorat has an area of 496 km^{2} and is bordered by the River Ebro, and by the comarques of Ribera d'Ebre, Baix Camp, les Garrigues, and Conca de Barberà. The region is mostly hilly, and in the extreme north of the comarca is the Montsant mountain range, rising to over 1000 m; the south is bordered by the Mola de Colldejou and the mountain ranges of Serra de Llaberia and Serra de Santa Marina.

The climate is continental: dry and hot in summer, cold in the winter.

== Municipalities ==
Municipality	Population (2017)	Area km^{2}
Bellmunt del Priorat	290	8.9
La Bisbal de Montsant	217	14.1
Cabacés	309	31.3
Capçanes	403	22.5
Cornudella de Montsant	953	63.5
Falset	2,820	31.6
La Figuera	102	18.7
Gratallops	237	13.5
Els Guiamets	272	12.1
El Lloar	117	6.6
Marçà	602	16.1
Margalef	101	34.7
El Masroig	510	15.5
El Molar	286	22.8
La Morera de Montsant	158	52.9
Poboleda	356	14.0
Porrera	405	28.8
Pradell de la Teixeta	163	21.8
La Torre de Fontaubella	137	7.1
Torroja del Priorat	149	13.2
Ulldemolins	395	38.2
La Vilella Alta	127	5.2
La Vilella Baixa	200	5.6
• Total: 23	9,345	498.6
