= Falset, Spain =

Falset
- Municipality
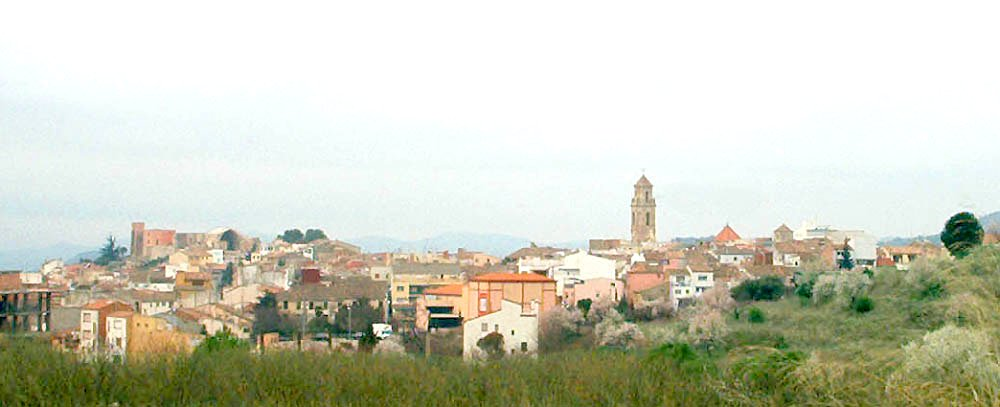
- Falset

- Coat of arms

- Location in Catalonia Falset (Spain)
- Coordinates: 41°9′N 0°49′E
- Country: Spain
- Community: Catalonia
- Province: Tarragona
- Comarca: Priorat

Government
  - Mayor: Carlos Brull Fornt (2019)

Area
  - Total: 31.6 km^{2} (12.2 sq mi)

Population (2025-01-01)
  - Total: 2,890
  - Density: 91.5/km^{2} (237/sq mi)
- Climate: Csa
- Website: www.falset.org

Falset (Catalan pronunciation: [falˈset]) is the principal village of the comarca of the Priorat, in Catalonia, very famous for its wine. It has a castle and two palaces (Medinacelli and Azahara). It is located about 30km inland from Salou on the N420 road. It has a population of 2,890 (register office, 2025).

The old winery of Falset, also known in Catalonia as one of the Wine Cathedrals, is from Modernisme and Noucentisme style and was designed by the architect Cèsar Martinell.
