= Cornudella de Montsant =

- Municipality
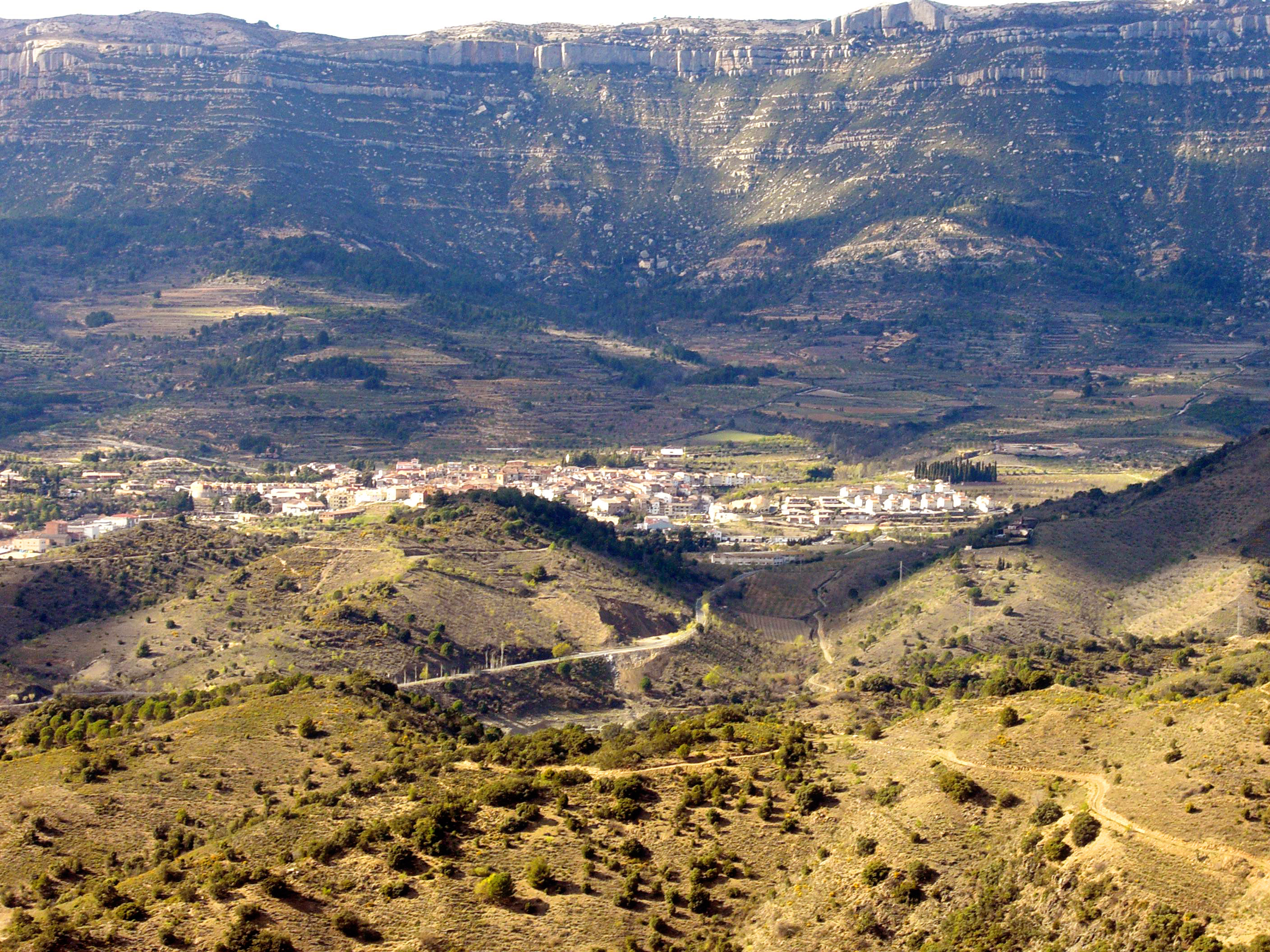
- The town with the massive escarpments in the background

- Coat of arms

- Location in Catalonia
- Coordinates: 41°16′01″N 0°54′22″E
- Country: Spain
- Community: Catalonia
- Province: Tarragona
- Comarca: Priorat

Government
  - Mayor: Salvador Salvadó Porqueres (2015)

Area
  - Total: 63.5 km^{2} (24.5 sq mi)
- Elevation: 533 m (1,749 ft)

Population (2025-01-01)
  - Total: 999
  - Density: 15.7/km^{2} (40.7/sq mi)
- Demonym: Cornudellenc
- Postal code: 43360
- Website: www.cornudella.cat

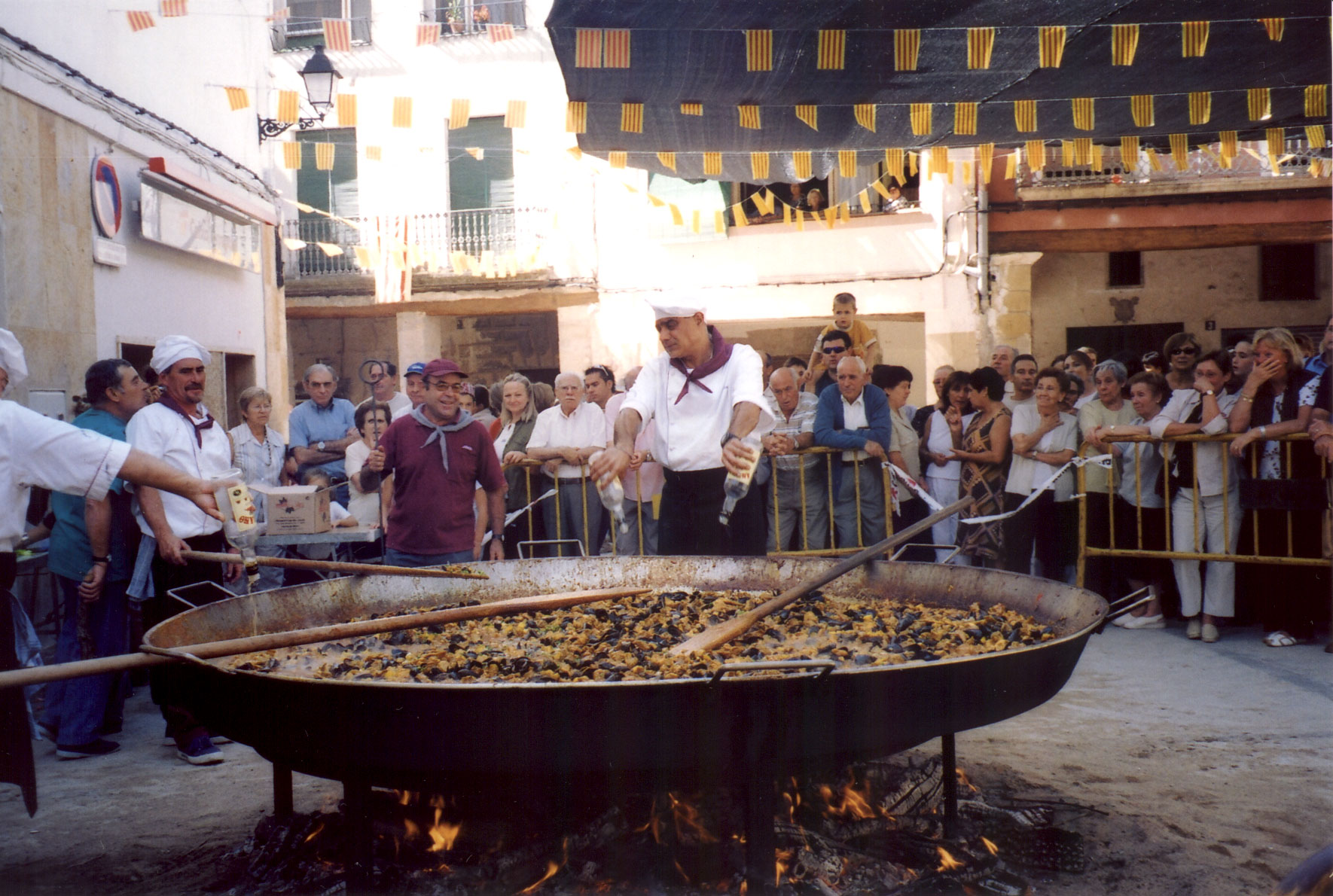
A giant paella being cooked during the village festival

Cornudella de Montsant (Catalan pronunciation: [koɾnuˈðeʎa ðe monˈsan]) is a municipality in the comarca of the Priorat in Catalonia, Spain. It is situated in the north-west of the comarca below the Montsant range and the Prades Mountains. The Siurana reservoir is on the territory of the municipality and supplies its drinking water.

It has a population of 999 (register office, 2025).

Sites near to the village include the Sant Joan del Codolar Hermitage. The village derives income from tourism and agriculture, particularly wine and hazelnuts. Cornudella de Montsant is at the centre of one of the world's major rock climbing regions.

== History ==
In medieval times the town was part of the Barony of Entença.

The painter and Carthusian monk Joaquim Juncosa was a native of this town before he moved to the nearby monastery of Scala Dei where he painted several frescoes and pictures.

The old winery of Cornudella de Montsant, also known in Catalonia as one of the 'Wine Cathedrals, was built during the Modernisme and Noucentisme periods and was designed by architect Cèsar Martinell.

== Bibliography ==
- Panareda Clopés, Josep Maria; Rios Calvet, Jaume; Rabella Vives, Josep Maria (1989). Guia de Catalunya, Barcelona: Caixa de Catalunya. ISBN 84-87135-01-3 (Spanish). ISBN 84-87135-02-1 (Catalan).
