= Devinssi Winery =

Coordinates: 41.19299°N 0.77769°E

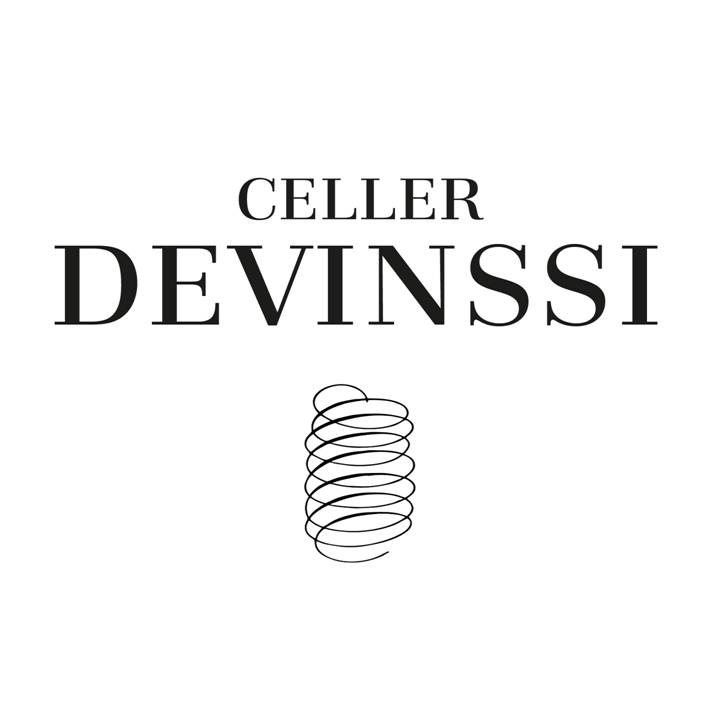
The Devinssi Cellar logo

Celler Devinssi is a winery in the Priorat Qualified Designation of Origin, located in the town of Gratallops. It elaborates artisanally the following brands: Il·lia (92 points awarded by the 2016 "Guía Peñín"), Mas de les Valls (red and white), Cupatge and Rocapoll (91 points awarded by the 2016 "Guía Peñín"). The winery also offers adoption of grapevines as a form of advanced sale.

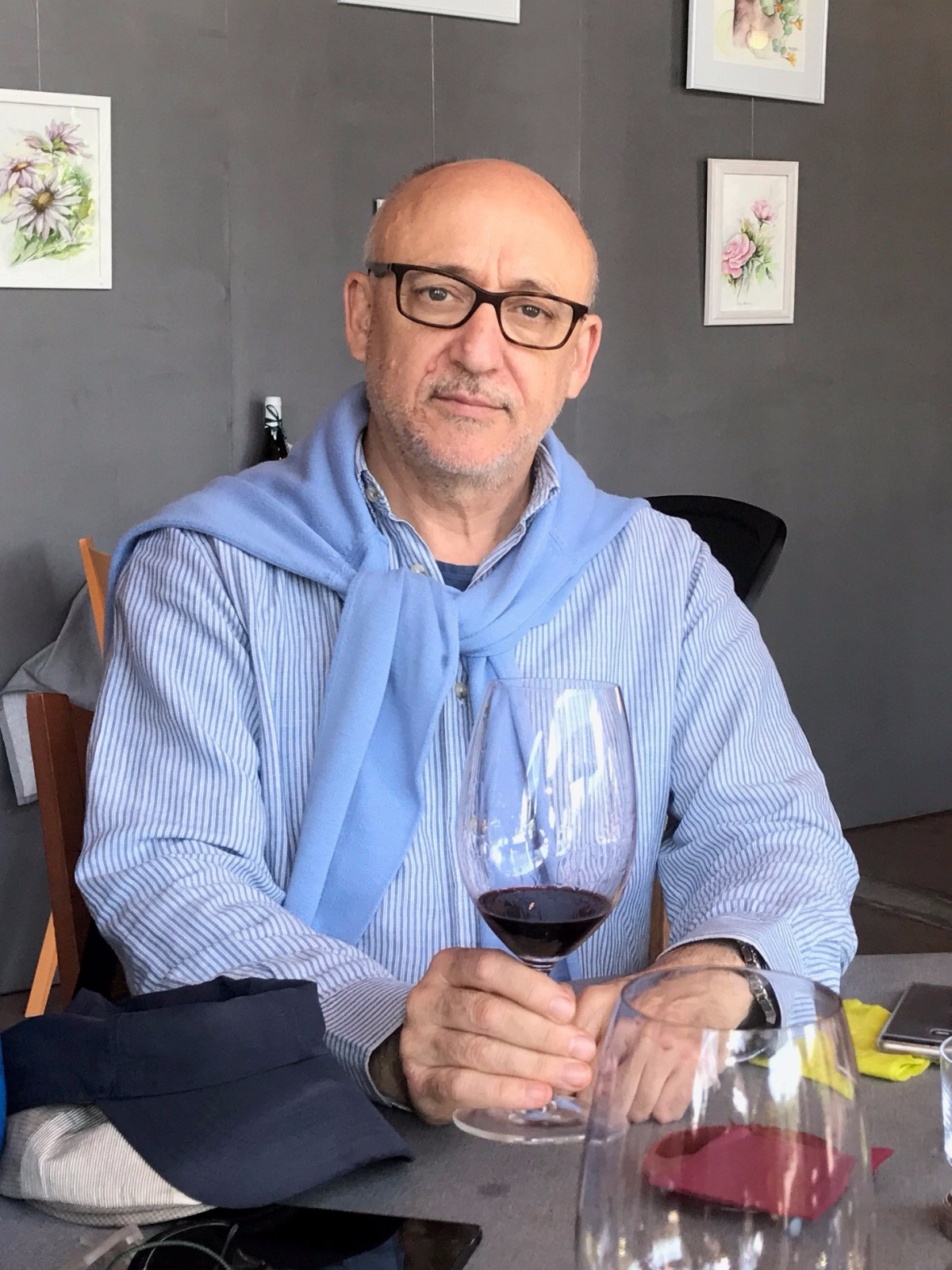
Josep Roca Benito

== History ==
Devinssi was started in 2000 as a winemaking company, founded by Josep Roca Benito, Master in Oenology and Viticulture. In 2001, the first vineyards were planted on the Les Planes estate, Gratallops, and the company began building a small winery in the same town, in the heart of Priorat. The first wines were made from vintages harvested from old Grenache and Carignan vines located in Gratallops and La Vilella Baixa. In 2005, an old Carignan terrain is recovered to produce the "Rocapoll" vi de vila.

== Image Gallery ==
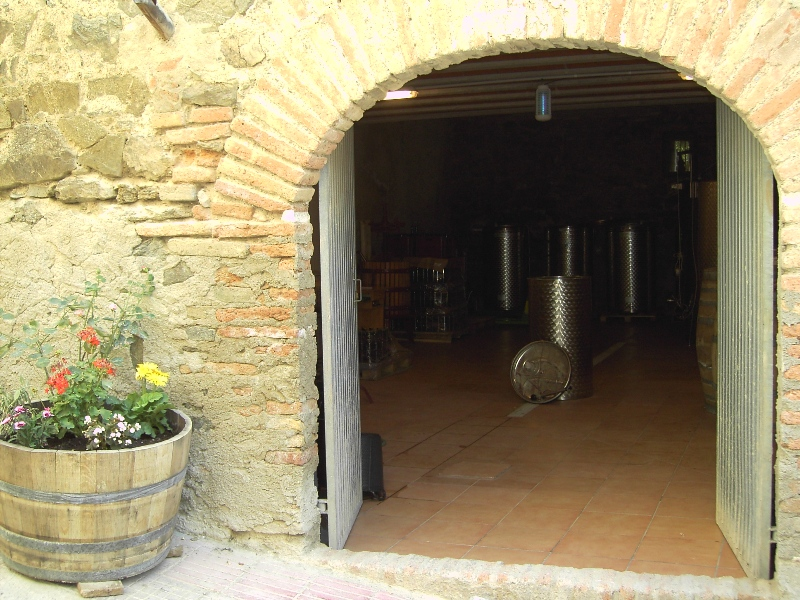
Entrance to the Devinssi Winery, Gratallops

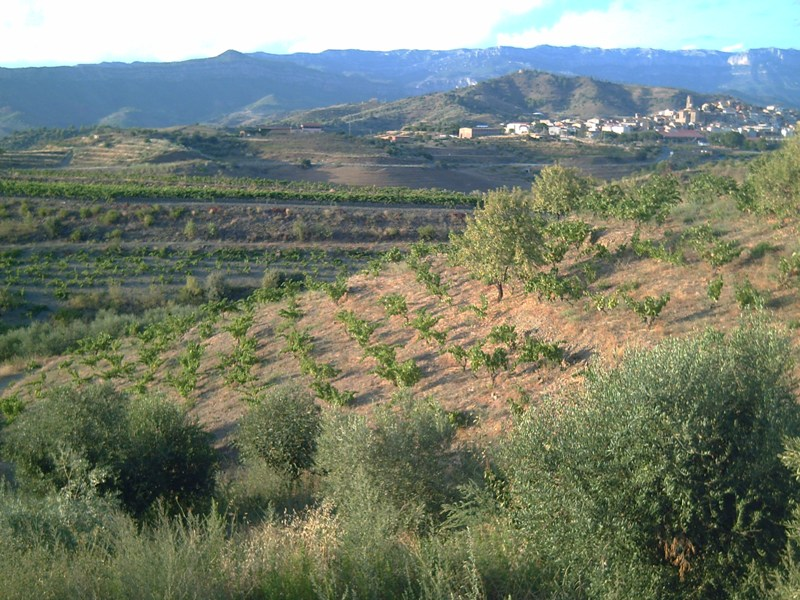
Rocapoll estate, Gratallops

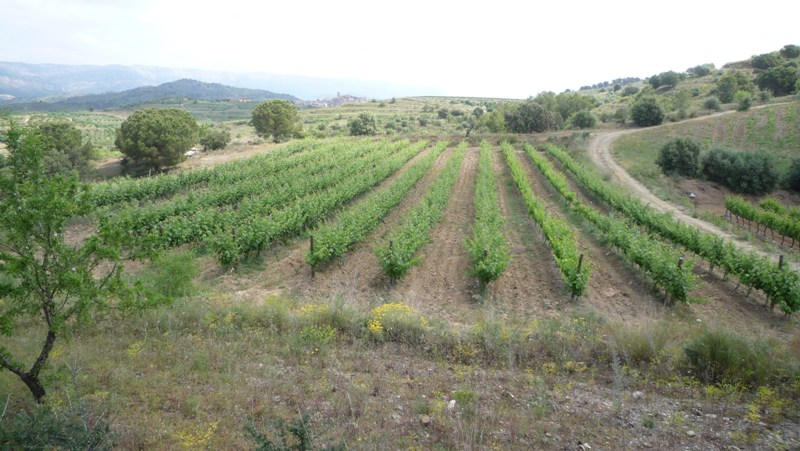
Les Planes estate, Gratallops
