= Piló dels Senyalets =

Mountain in Catalonia, Spain

- Location within Catalonia

Highest point
- Elevation: 1,107 m (3,632 ft)
- Listing: List of mountains in Catalonia
- Coordinates: 41°16′54″N 0°49′35″E

Geography
- Location: Priorat, Catalonia
- Parent range: Serra de Montsant

Climbing
- Easiest route: From La Morera de Montsant

Piló dels Senyalets is a mountain in Catalonia, Spain. It has an elevation of 1,107 metres (3,632 ft) above sea level.
