= Priorat DOQ =

Spanish Denominación de Origen Calificada

Coordinates: 41°08′N 0°49′E

- Wine region
- Priorat DOQ in the province of Tarragona in the region of Catalonia
- Official name: Denominació d'Origen Qualificada Priorat / Denominació d'Origen Protegida Priorat
- Type: Denominación de Origen Calificada
- Year established: 2006 (DO 1954)
- Country: Spain
- Precipitation (annual average): 400-600 mm
- Total area: 19,783 hectares
- Size of planted vineyards: 2,010 hectares (4,967 acres) (2018)
- No. of vineyards: 567
- Grapes produced: 4.8 tn
- No. of wineries: 109
- Wine produced: 14,417 hectolitres
- Comments: Data for 2016 / 2017

Priorat is a Denominació d'Origen Qualificada (DOQ) for Catalan wines produced in the Priorat county, in the province of Tarragona, in the southwest of Catalonia.

The DOQ covers 11 municipalities. It primarily produces powerful red wines, which came to international attention in the 1990s. The area is characterised by its unique terroir of black slate and quartz soil known as llicorella.

It is one of only two wine regions in Spain to qualify as DOCa, the highest qualification level for a wine region according to Spanish wine regulations, alongside Rioja DOCa.

Priorat is the Catalan word, the one that appears most often on wine labels, while the Castilian equivalent is Priorato.

== History ==
The first recorded evidence of grape growing and wine production dates from the 12th century, when the monks from the Carthusian Monastery of Scala Dei, founded in 1194, introduced the art of viticulture in the area. The prior of Scala Dei ruled as a feudal lord over seven villages in the area, which gave rise to the name Priorat. The monks tended the vineyards for centuries until 1835 when they were expropriated by the state, and distributed to smallholders.

At the end of the 19th century, the phylloxera pest devastated the vineyards causing economic ruin and large scale emigration of the population. Before the phylloxera struck, Priorat is supposed to have had around 5,000 hectares (12,000 acres) of vineyards. It was not until the 1950s that replanting was undertaken. The DO Priorat was formally created in 1954. The seat of the DO's regulatory body was initially Reus, some 30 km to the east of the wine-region, rather than in Priorat itself.

In the decade from 1985, the production of bulk wine was phased out and bottling of quality wine phased in.

Location of Priorat in Catalonia

Early on, winemaking cooperatives dominated. Much of the development of Priorat wines to top class is credited to Carles Pastrana, René Barbier and Álvaro Palacios. Winemaker Barbier, then active at a winery in Rioja owned by the Palacios family, bought his first land for Priorat vineyards in 1979, convinced of the region's potential. At this stage, there were 600 hectares (1,500 acres) of Priorat vineyards. In the 1980s, he convinced others, including Palacios, to follow suit and plant new vineyards in suitable locations, all named Clos. For the first three vintages, 1989–1991, the group of five wineries pooled their grapes, shared a winery in Gratallops, and made one wine sold under five labels: Clos Mogador (Barbier), Clos Dofi (Palacios, later renamed to Finca Dofi), Clos Erasmus (Daphne Glorian), Clos Martinet (Josep Lluis Perez, now referred to as Mas Martinet), and Clos de l'Obac (Pastrana). From 1992, these wines were made separately. In 1993, Palacios produced a wine called L'Ermita sourced from very old Priorat vines, which led to an increased interest in using the region's existing vineyards to produce wines in a new style.

The Catalan authorities approved of Priorat's elevation from DO to DOQ status in 2000, but national level confirmation from the Spanish Government in Madrid came only on 6 July 2009. In the period from 2000 to 2009, when it was approved as DOQ but not yet as DOCa, despite the fact that these designations were exactly the same but in Catalan and Spanish, respectively, the situation was somewhat confused. A new set of DOQ rules was approved by the Catalan government in 2006. The regulatory body moved from Reus to Torroja del Priorat in 1999.

The vineyard surface of Priorat has been continuously expanding since the Clos-led quality revolution in the 1990s. At the turn of the millennium there was 1,000 hectares (2,500 acres) of vineyards, with an equal amount of planting rights secured. As of 2018, Priorat had 2,010 hectares (5,000 acres) of vineyards.

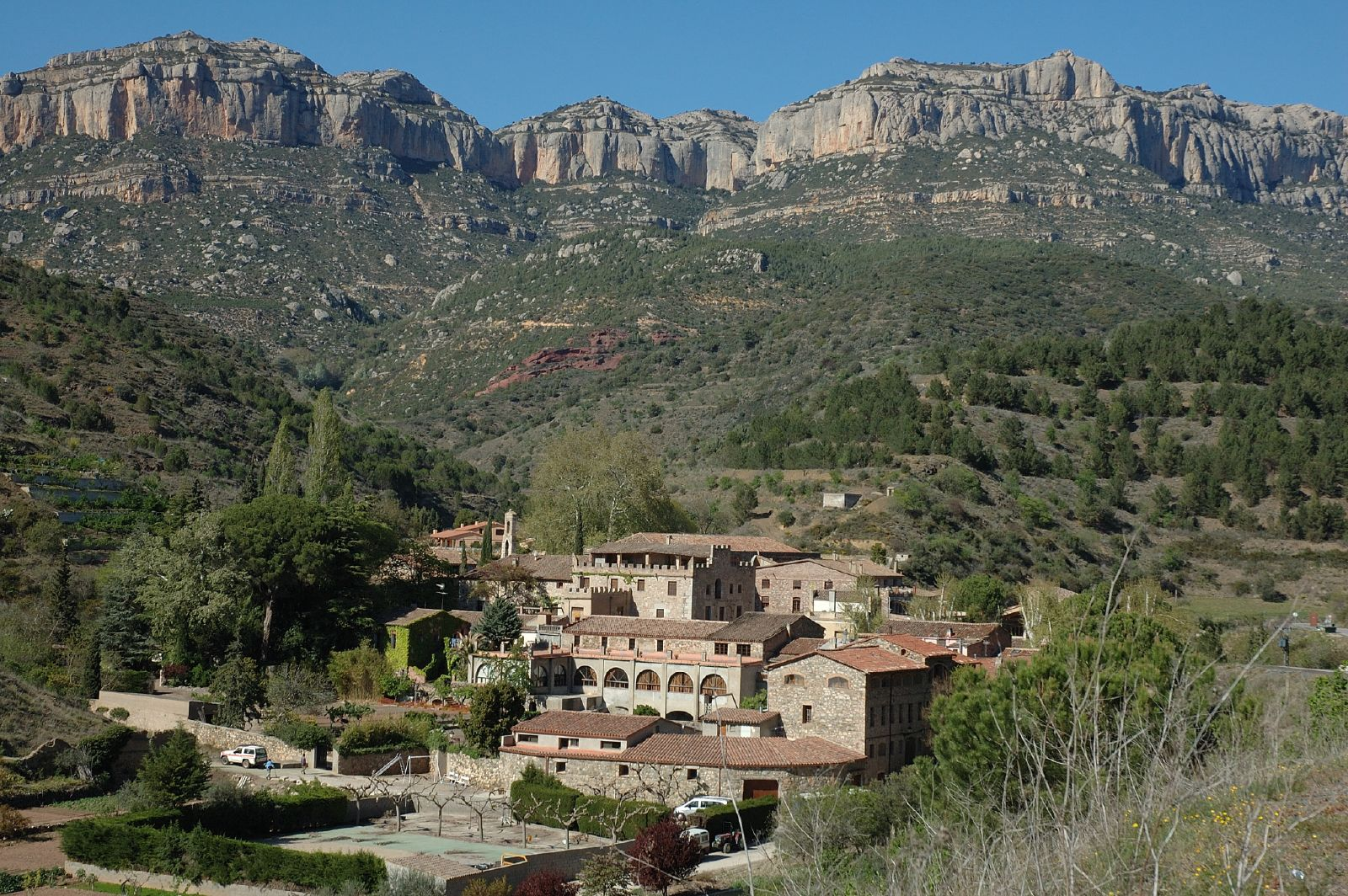
The village of Escaladei with the Montsant mountains in the background.

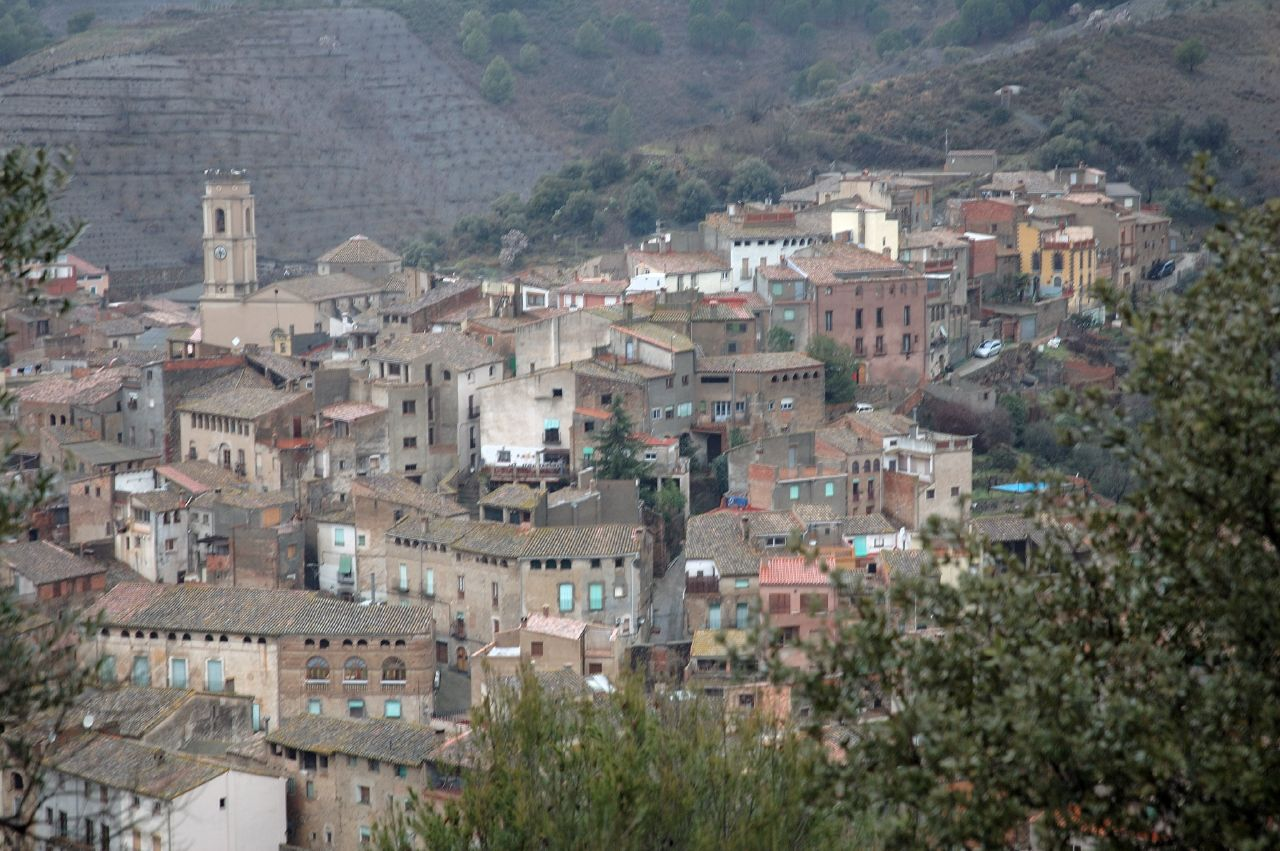
Porrera, one of the villages of Priorat, with vineyards visible on the left behind the village.

== Geography ==
The DOQ comprises the valleys of the rivers Siurana and Montsant. The vineyards are planted on the slopes on terraces at altitudes of between 100 metres (330 ft) and 700 metres (2,300 ft) above sea level. Priorat is almost entirely surrounded by the DO Montsant, which makes wine in a similar style. The demarcated zone has a total size of 19,783 hectares (48,880 acres). The Priorat DOQ is formed around 12 towns: Bellmunt del Priorat, Gratallops, el Lloar, la Morera de Montsant, Porrera, Poboleda, Scala Dei, Torroja del Priorat, la Vilella Alta and la Vilella Baixa, and the grape growing zones of Masos de Falset and Solanes del Molar.

== Soils ==
The area is of volcanic origin which confers interesting characteristics to the soil. The basis (called llicorella in Catalan) comprises reddish and black slate with small particles of mica, which reflects the sunlight and conserves heat. The 50 centimetres (20 in) thick topsoil is formed of decomposed slate and mica. These characteristics force the roots of the vines to reach the base for water, nutrition and minerals. These soil characteristics confer special quality to the wine and keep the vines firmly anchored to the earth during the strong winds and storms which are common to the area.

== Climate ==
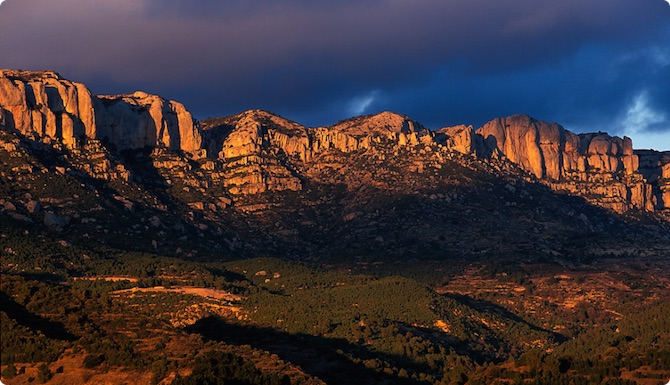
Montsant Natural Park in Priorat - Spain

Even though Priorat DOQ covers a small area, there are several different micro-climates present. Generally, the climate is more extreme than most continental climate areas, though there is a marked contrast between the valleys and the higher areas. There are both freezing winds from the north (mitigated somewhat by the Serra de Montsant mountain range) and also the warm Mistral wind from the east.

Priorat has a long growing season. The summers are hot and dry (with temperatures as high as 35 °C (95 °F) while winters are cold (with temperatures as low as −4 °C (25 °F). There is the occasional risk of frost, hailstones and drought. The average annual temperature is 15 °C (59 °F), and average annual rainfall is 400–600 millimetres (16–24 in).

== Grapes ==
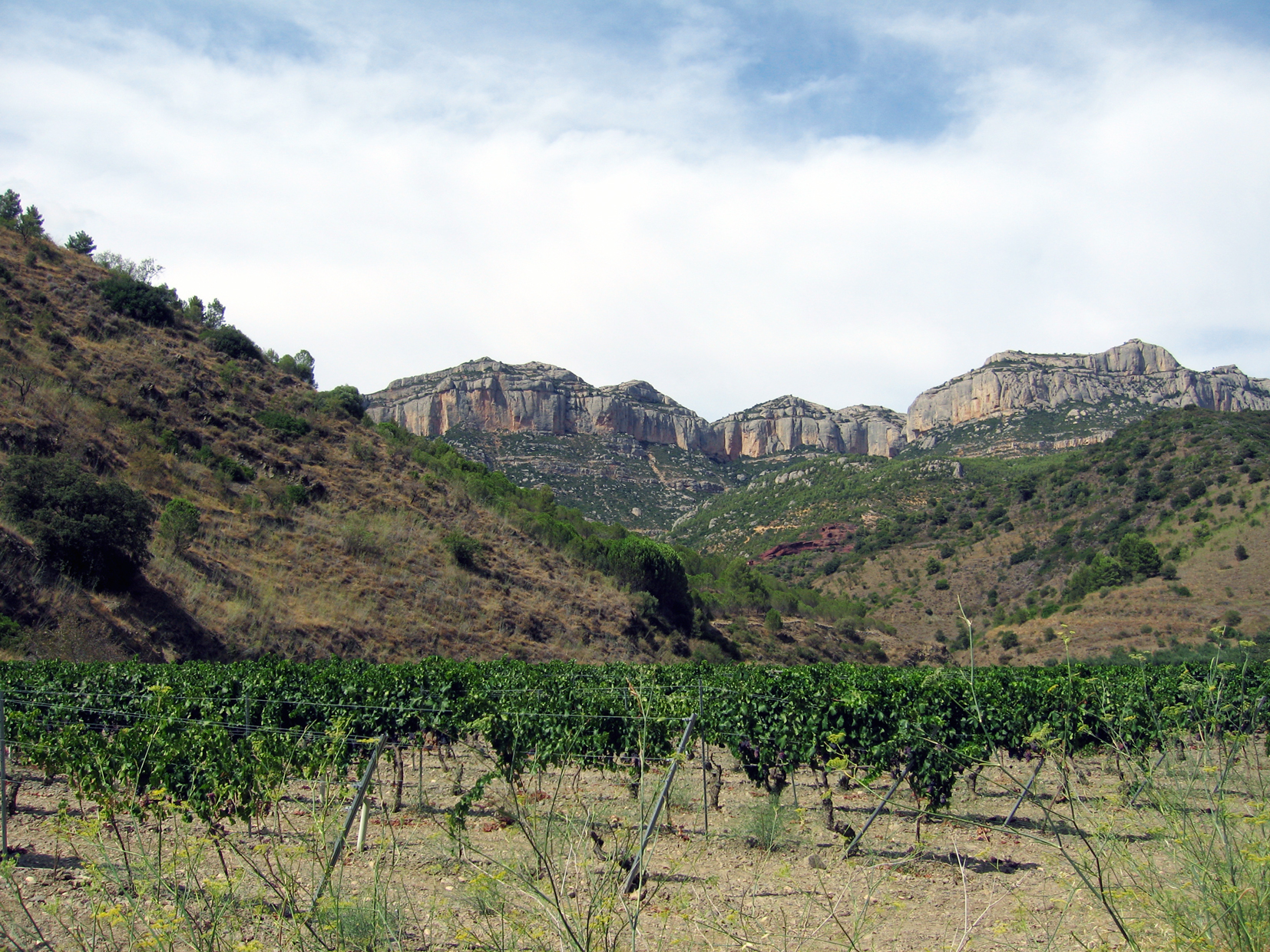
Vineyard belonging to Scala Dei.

The traditional grape variety grown in El Priorat is the red Garnatxa negre, which is found in all the older vineyards. Also authorized are the following red varieties: Garnacha Peluda, Cariñena (or Samsó), Cabernet Franc, Cabernet Sauvignon, Merlot and Syrah. Four white varieties are also authorized: Garnacha blanca, Macabeo, Pedro Ximénez and Chenin.

The trend among the red varieties is that Garnacha stays constant, Cariñena decreases and the international grape varieties increase. While Cabernet Sauvignon has always been in the lead among these, in recent years, Syrah has increased faster.

Yields are very low, usually much lower than the authorized maximum yield of 6,000 kg/ha, due to the rocky nature of the soil that does not allow the accumulation of water. The vines are usually planted as low bushes (en vaso) though the newer vineyards tend to be planted on trellises (en espaldera).

As of 2018, Priorat had 2,010 hectares (5,000 acres) of vineyards, of which 1,872 hectares (4,630 acres) or 93% was planted with red varieties, and 138 hectares (340 acres) or 7% with white varieties. The average planting density was 2,850 vines per hectare, compared to the mandated 2,500 to 9,000 vines per hectare.

The distribution of grape varieties is as follows:

Priorat grape varieties (2018 situation)
Red varieties				White varieties			
Variety	Planted area (ha)	Proportion	KG	Variety	Planted area (ha)	Proportion	KG
Garnacha tinta	743.8	41.1%	2,673,374	Garnacha blanca	83.1	5.1%	330,122
Cariñena	539.7	23.4%	1,532,966	Macabeo	25.2	1.0%	63,608
Cabernet Sauvignon	225.9	9.9%	643,720	Pedro Ximénez	11.1	0.5%	29,550
Syrah	222.4	10.1%	654,200	Viognier	10.5	0.5%	26,879
Merlot	100.7	6.5%	420,165				
Other varieties	39.47	0.8%	93,658	Other varieties	8.24	0.5%	31,461
Sum	1872.0	92.6%	6,018,083	Sum	138.1	7.4%	481,620

== Production ==
In 2008, 4,796 tonnes (5,287 tons) of grapes were harvested, of which 4,580 tonnes (5,050 tons) (96%) was red grapes and 198.5 tonnes (218.8 tons) (4%) white grapes. This resulted in 27,698 hectolitres (609,300 imp gal; 731,700 US gal) of wine. During the recent expansion of Priorat vineyards, production of red grapes has expanded, while the production of white grapes has even declined somewhat. Thus, the proportion of white grapes has dropped from 10% in 2001 to 4% in 2008, while the total production increased by 92% over the same period.

The yield in 2008 corresponds to 2,700 kg of grapes per hectare compared to the official maximum of 6,000 kg per hectare, and corresponds to 16 hectoliter per hectare. The official maximum corresponds to a yield of 39 hectoliter per hectare, as a 65% conversion (0.65 litre of wine per kilogram of grapes) is foreseen. Some producers have yields of only around 5 hectoliter per hectare.

== Wines ==
The traditional reds from El Priorat are a single grape ("varietal") bottling of Grenache or Carignan, or a blend of these two grapes in a Bordeaux style with other French varieties such as Cabernet Sauvignon, Merlot, or Syrah, among others.

- Criança wines must remain in oak barrels for 6 months and then 18 months in the bottle.
- Reserva wines must remain in oak barrels for 12 months and then 24 months in the bottle.
- Gran Reserva wines remain in oak barrels for 24 months and then 36 months in the bottle.

Few wineries (cellars) follow these guidelines strictly, and the usual practice is to produce wines labeled as vino de guarda (aged wine), which has been in oak barrels for 18 months followed by 6 months in the bottle, with the optimal time for consumption being 2 years later.
