= Juncosa (surname) =

Juncosa is a surname. Notable people with the surname include:

- Francisco Cortés Juncosa (born 1983), Spanish field hockey player
- Joaquim Juncosa (1631–1708), Spanish painter and monk
- Nuria Juncosa (born 1952), Spanish painter, cinematographer and web artist
- Sylvia Juncosa, American guitarist, singer, songwriter, and keyboardist
