= Adoption (disambiguation) =

Adoption usually refers to the legal act of permanently placing a child with a relative or non-biological (adoptive) parents other than the biological (natural) parents.

Adoption may also refer to:

- Adoption (theology), admission of believers into the family of God
- Pet adoption, the process of taking ownership of and responsibility for a pet for which a previous owner has abdicated responsibility
- Adoption (software implementation), the transfer from an old software system to a new one in an organization
- Adoption (farming and cattle raising)
- Treaty adoption
- Adoption (film), a 1975 Hungarian film
- L'adoption or Adoption, a 1979 French film starring Geraldine Chaplin
- Adopted (film), a 2009 American film
