= Cèsar Martinell i Brunet =

Spanish architect (1888–1973)

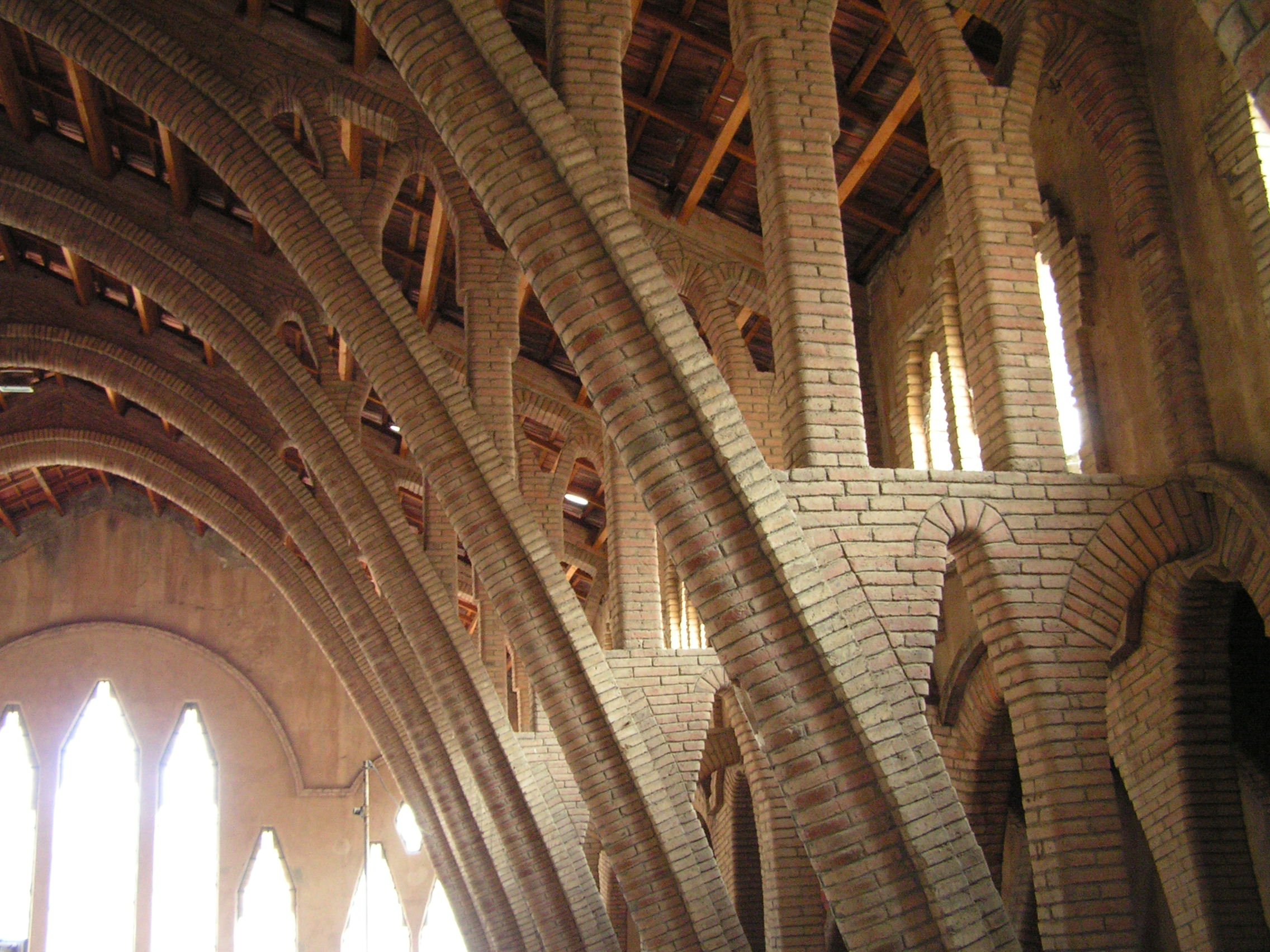
- Interior of one of Martinell's "cathedrals of wine". This is the cooperative wine cellar at Pinell de Brai, in Southern Catalonia.
- Born: 24 December 1888; Valls
- Died: 19 November 1973 (aged 84); Barcelona, Catalonia
- Occupation: Architect
- Practice: arti'cimo
- Buildings: Winery of Cornudella de Montsant; Winery of Falset; Winery of Nulles; Winery of Barberà de la Conca; Winery of Rocafort de Queralt; Winery of Gandesa; Winery of Pinell de Brai; Flour making factory of Cervera

Cèsar Martinell i Brunet (Valls, 24 December 1888 - Barcelona, 19 November 1973) was a Catalan modernista architect. He was part of the small and selected group of architects that were connected to Antoni Gaudí, his most important teacher. As a multifaceted person, Martinell was also a researcher and art historian. He became famous for the many wine cellars he made for the agriculture cooperatives of different towns throughout Catalonia, especially in the south, in the Province of Tarragona. These are known as "the cathedrals of wine".

== Artistic style ==
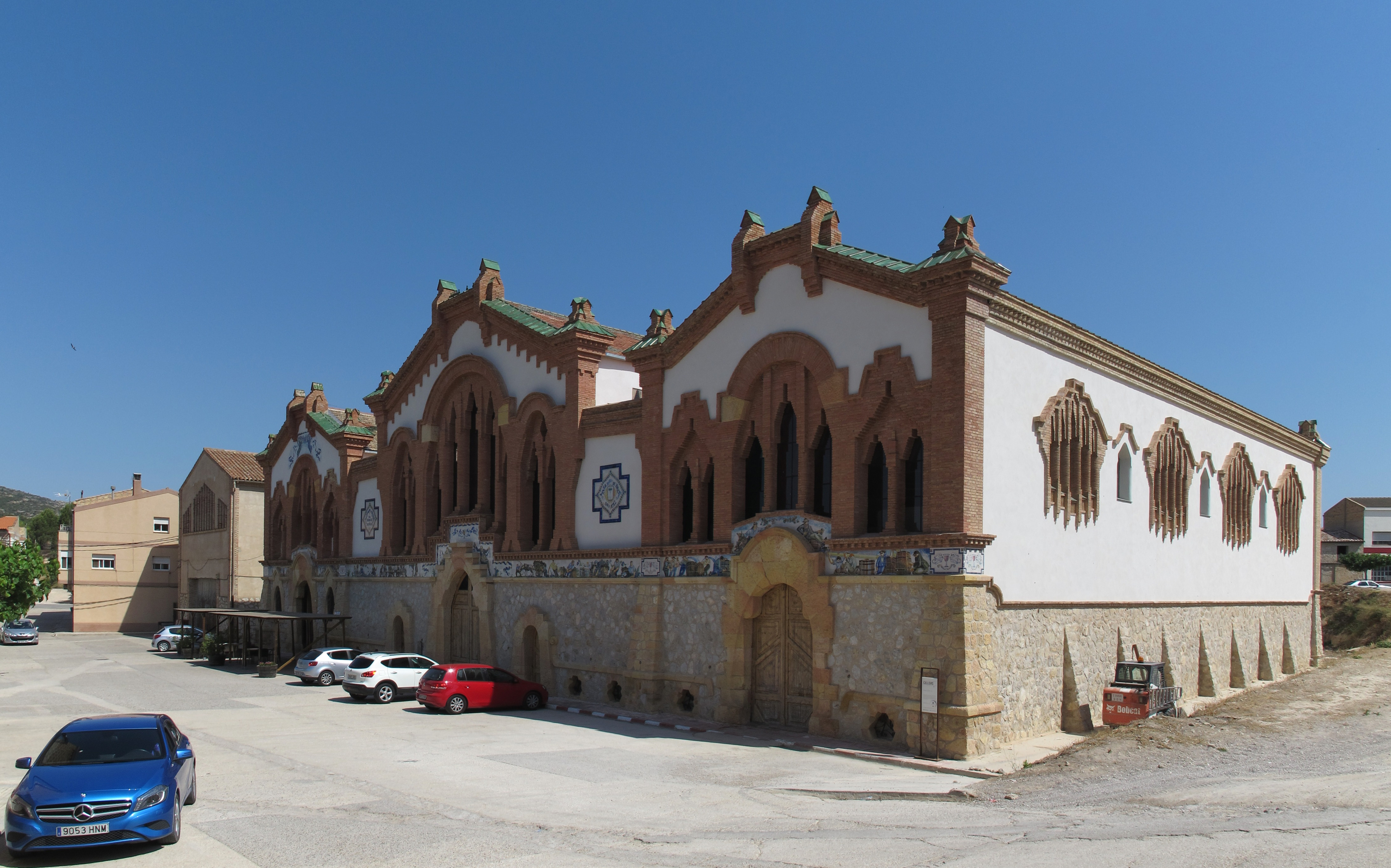
Pinell de Brai's winery.

Cèsar Martinell artistic style was primarily Modernisme, with some Noucentisme. His masterpieces were his designs for wineries, which are called the cathedrals of wine (les catedrals del vi) due to their magnificence. The use of traditional architectural techniques and materials helped to build these monumental buildings. His wine cathedrals are located in several cities of Catalonia such as Falset, Nulles, Cornudella de Montsant, Montblanc and Gandesa, and some of them can be visited. He also designed the flour mill of Cervera and he managed restoration projects, such as the Basilica of Santa Maria in Igualada.

== Photo gallery ==
Wine Cathedrals

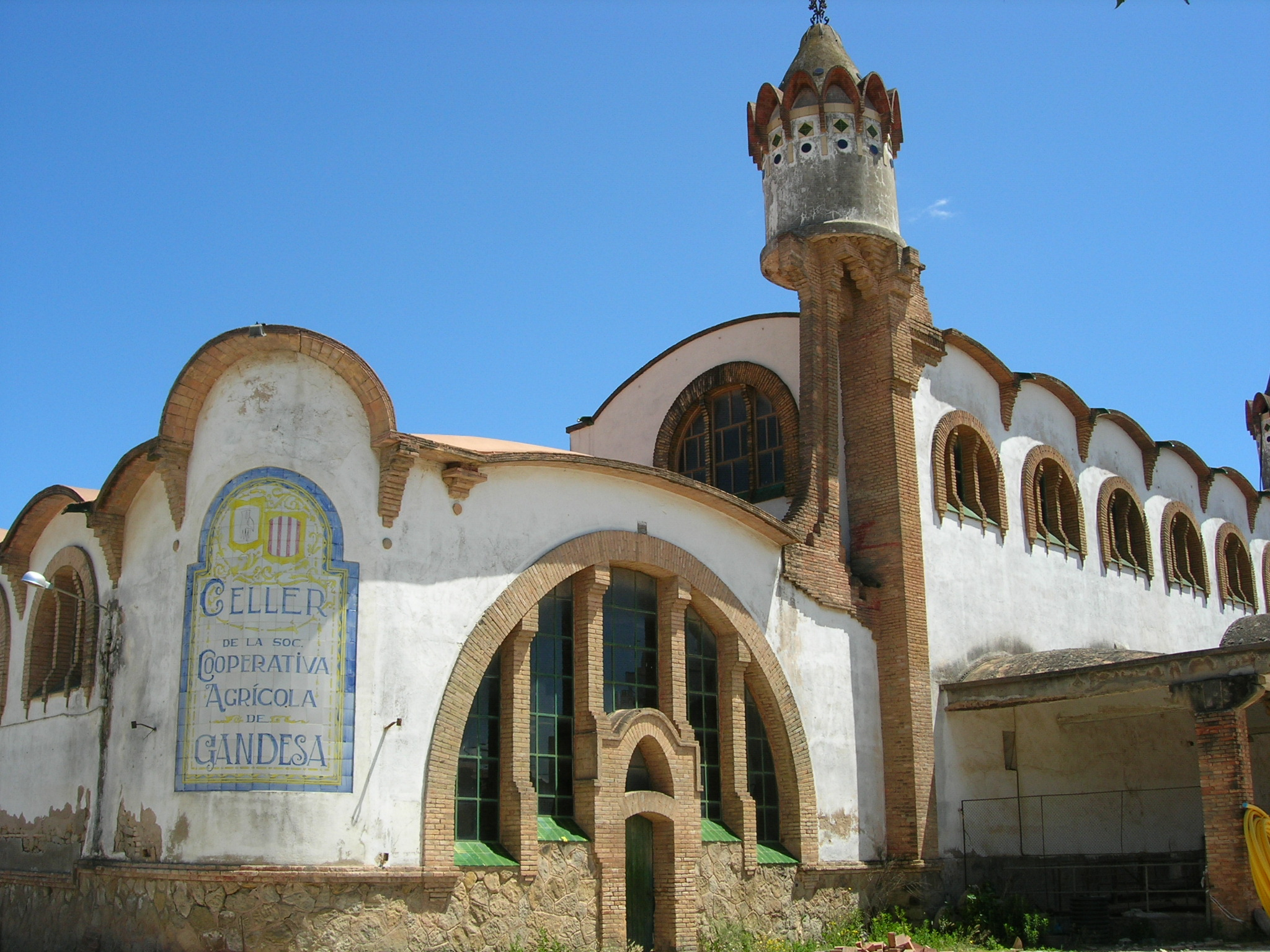
Exterior of the cooperative winery in Gandesa, Terra Alta

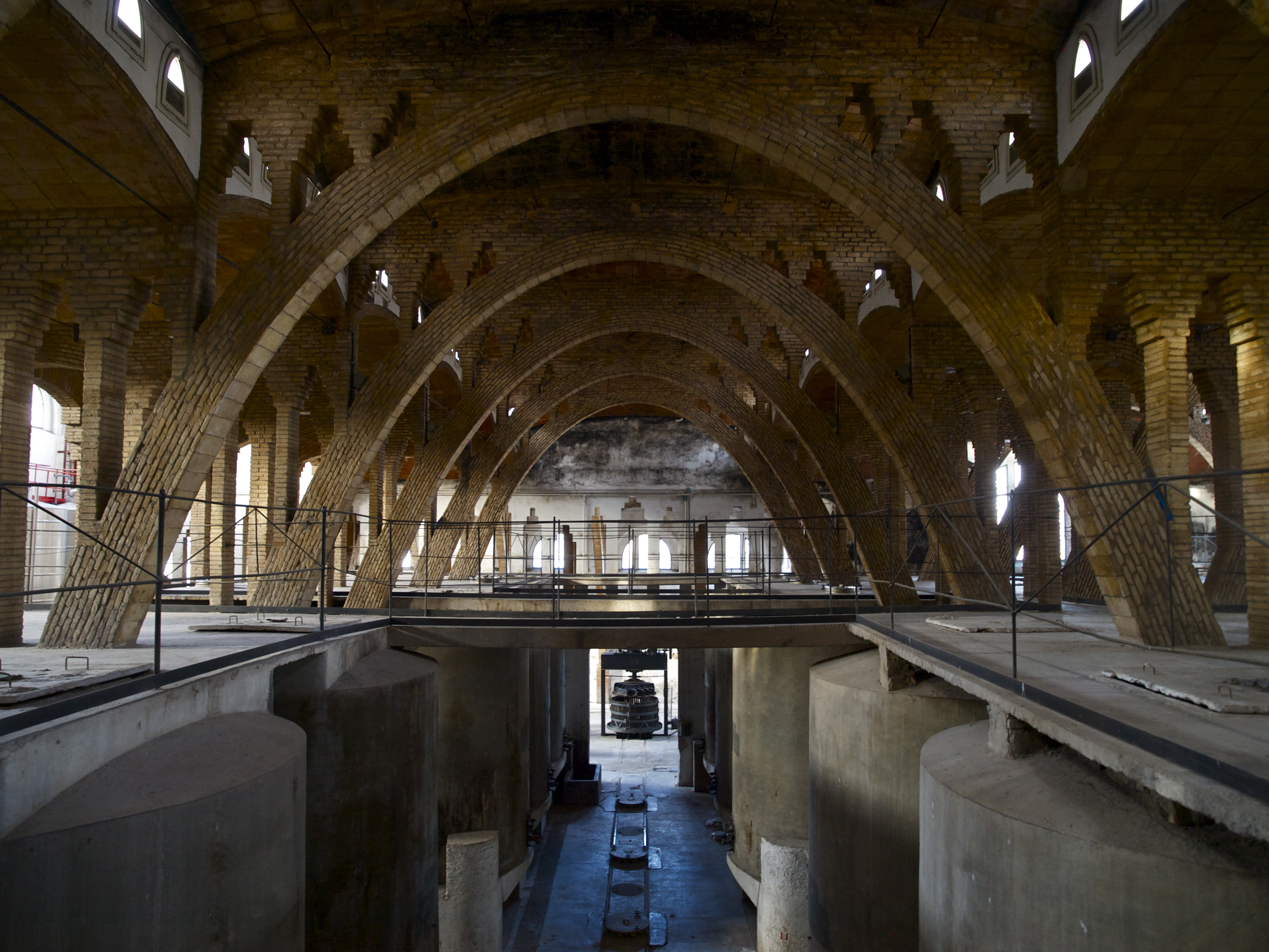
Interior of the Gandesa cooperative winery.

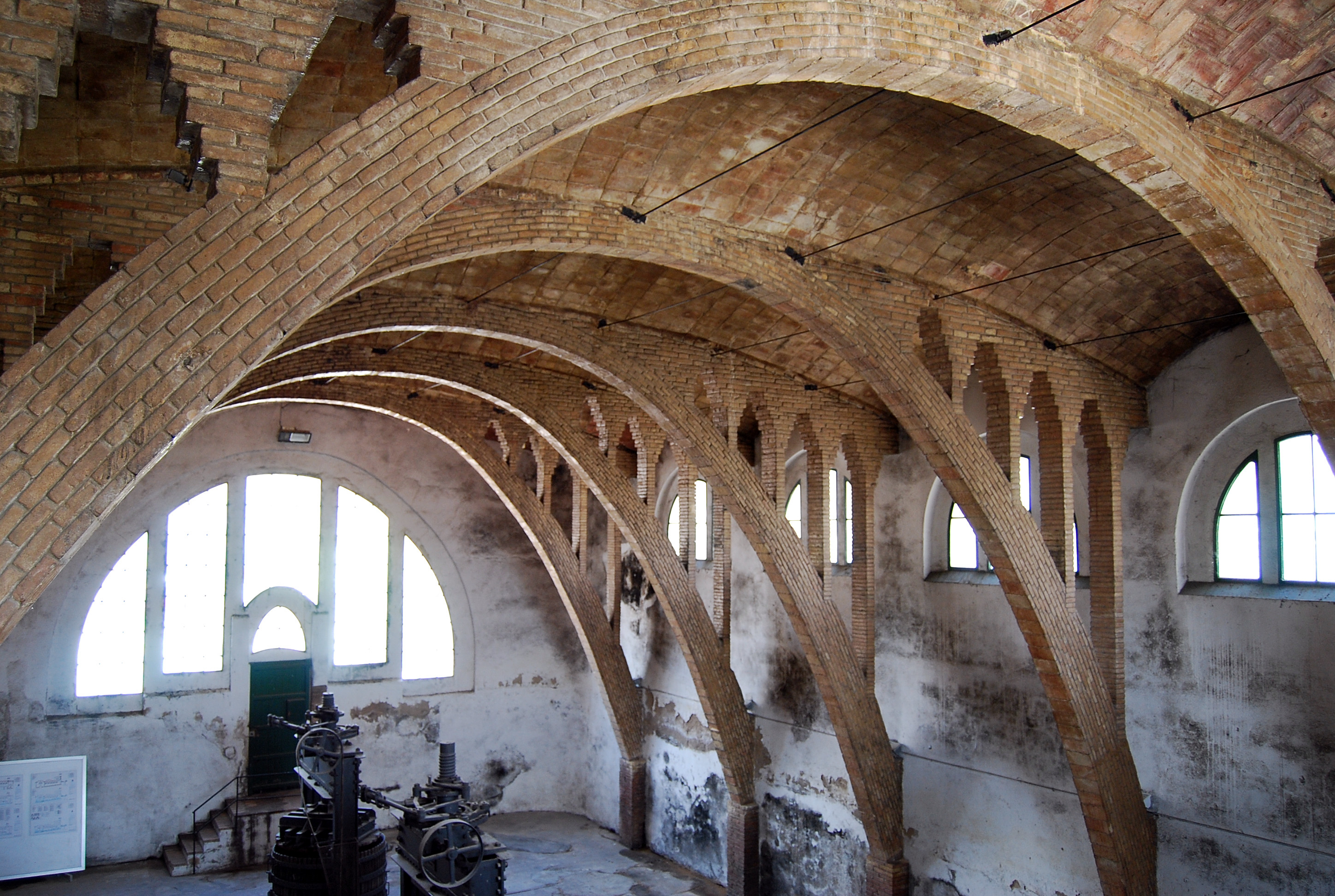
Interior of the Gandesa cooperative winery, another view.

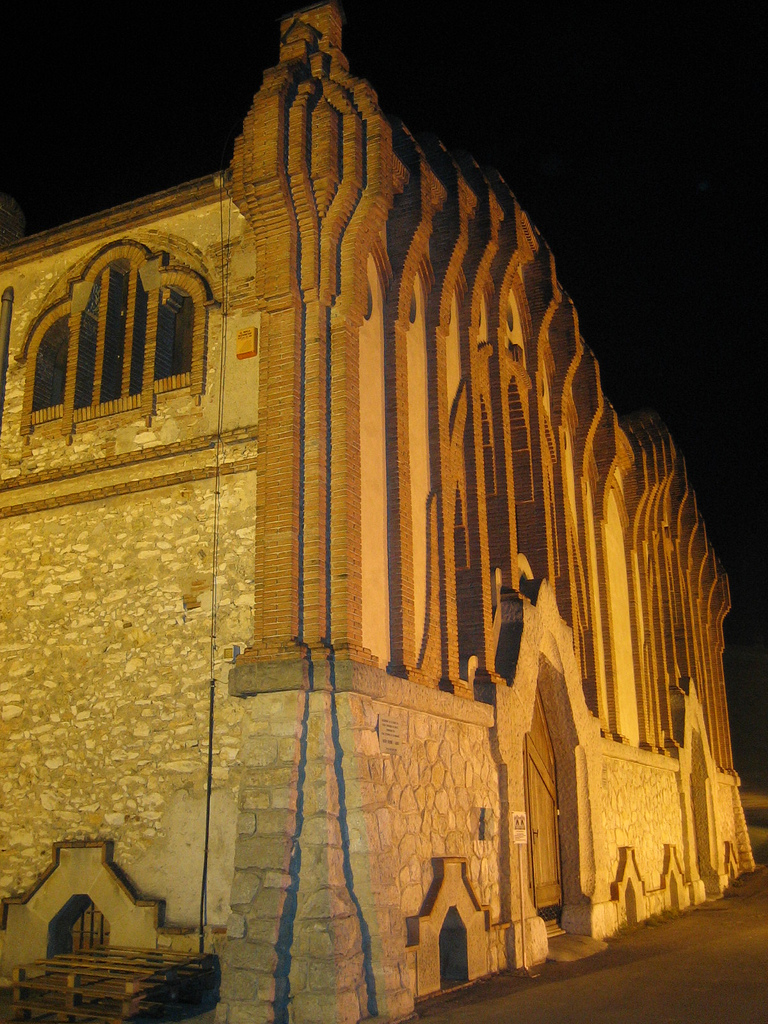
Interior of the Nulles cooperative winery.

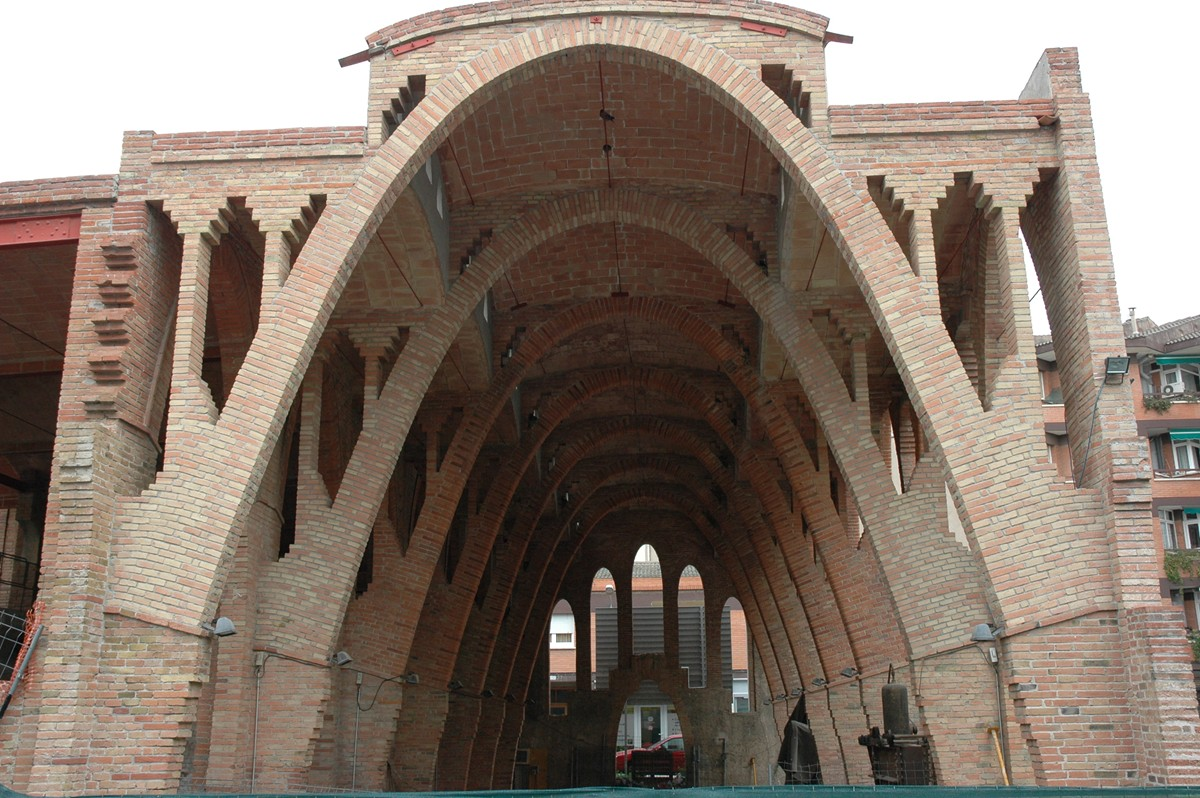
Winery cooperative of Sant Cugat del Vallès, next to Barcelona.
