= Basilica of Santa Maria, Igualada =

Santa Maria d'Igualada
- Basilica de Santa Maria d'Igualada
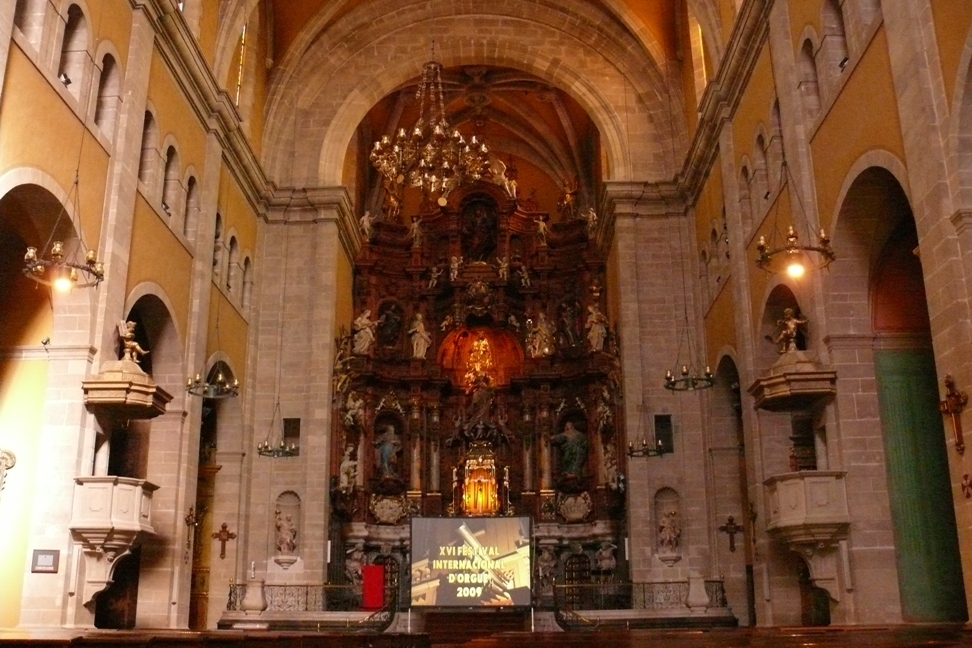
- Main altarpiece
- Santa Maria d'Igualada
- 41°34′43.05″N 1°37′6.23″E
- Country: Spain
- Denomination: Roman Catholic
- Website: Santamaria

Architecture
- Architect(s): Pere Blai; Rafael Plançó; Pau Ginestar
- Style: Gothic and Renaissance
- Years built: 1003

Administration
- Diocese: Roman Catholic Diocese of Vic

The Basilica of Santa Maria is the main temple and the most important historical building of Igualada, province of Barcelona, Catalonia, Spain. Santa Maria church origin is from the 11th century, but the current building is mainly from the 17th century.

== Origin and history ==
The church of Santa Maria, also known as the "big church" (in Catalan language "Església Gran"), is the most important historical building of Igualada, capital of the Anoia comarca. The first settlement of Igualada is dated around year 1000, in the location were the current church lies today, which was at that time a crossing of the two routes which were linking Barcelona with Aragon, and the north of Catalonia with its south. The origins of the church are from the 11th century, but most of the current building is from the 17th century.

During the Spanish Civil War it was converted into a market, and was restored after the war, under the guidance of the architect Cèsar Martinell. In 1949 Santa Maria obtained the title of Minor Basilica granted by the pope Pius XII.

The most recent rehabilitation took place in the 1980s, which was inaugurated in 1990. The elements of the church are the result of different construction stages and therefore respond to different aesthetic influences and styles.

== The building ==
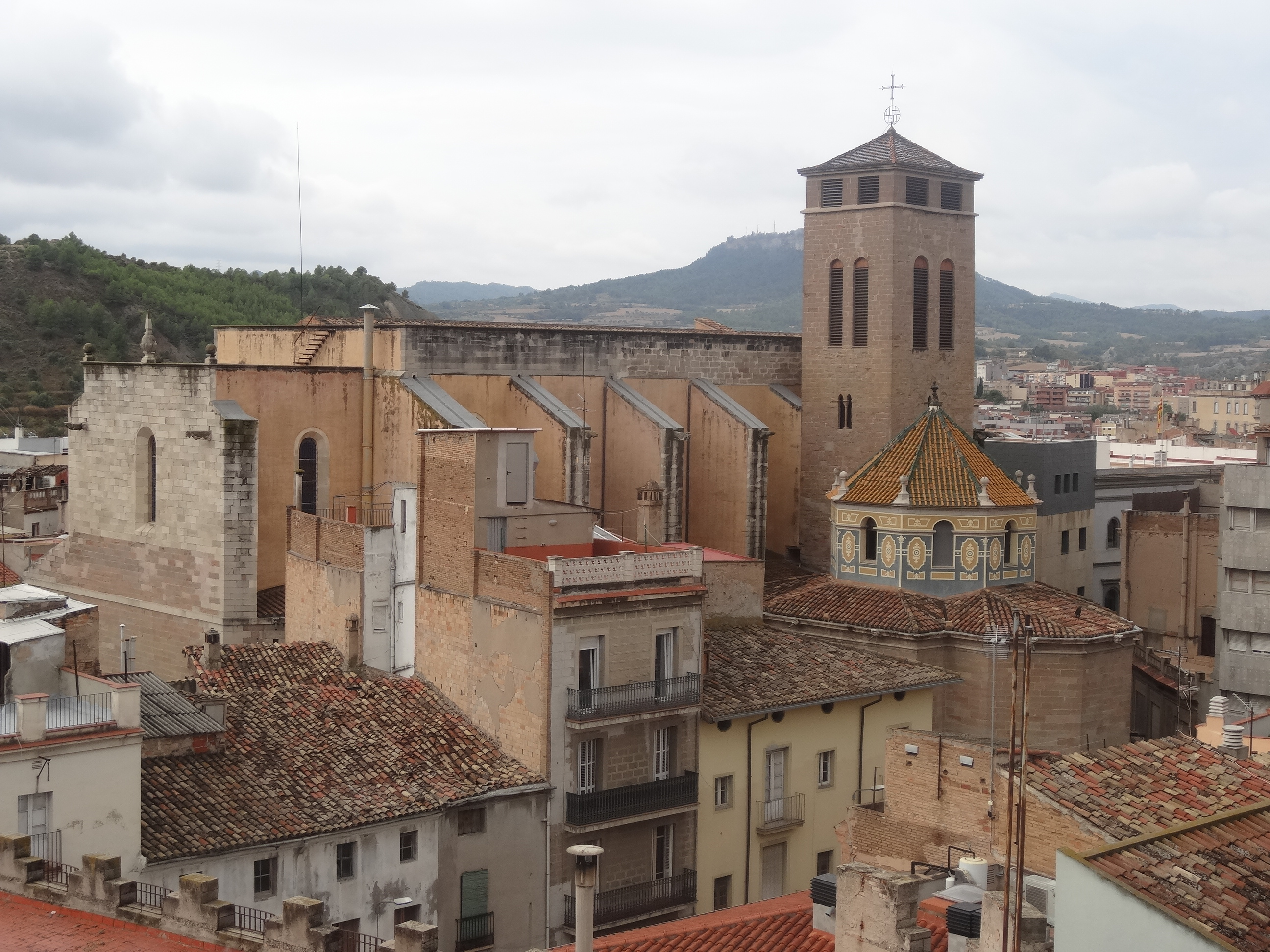

=== Central Body ===
Santa Maria has a single nave. Its structure is typical of the Catalan Renaissance, which is characterized by the formal austerity. This is proved by the aesthetic treatment of the facade, which only emphasizes the rosette window, as well as the side walls, where the uniformity is broken only by windows and the buttresses, which are decorated by some of gargoyles, with human and animal forms. The roof of the nave has a design typical of the Gothic: the vault. The arches of the ceiling form a skeleton of ribs, which come together in different spherical elements, where there are carved figures of saints. The round arches rest on pillars of Italianate style, topped by a gallery of arcades, called triforium, and a cornice. An apse with quadrangular base closes the end of the nave. This space, where the main altar is located, is covered by a star-shaped vault, where the keys represent the Virgin Mary, at the center, and the evangelists, at the sides.

=== Side Chapels ===
At both sides, the nave of Santa Maria is flanked by twelve chapels. Despite the Baroque style, the decoration of some of the chapels is relatively recent, since they were rebuilt after the Spanish Civil War tanks to donations from "gremis", the local trade organizations. As examples, the altars of Saint Anthony Abbot (patron saint of muleteers), Saint Isidore the Laborer (patron of farmers), Saint Anthony of Padua (patron of tanners), Saint Christopher (patron of motorists) and Saint Antonio Maria Claret (patron of weavers). Under the bell tower, covered by a pointed arch, there is the altar of Our Lady of Sorrows, considered the oldest part of the church and which corresponds to a widening of the old Romanesque chapel, built in the 14th century .

=== "Sant Crist" chapel ===
One of the distinctive elements of the church is the "Sant Crist" chapel. This element, of baroque style, dates from the early 18th century and occupies an annex on the left side of the nave, near the bell tower. It has a Latin cross base. It is covered by a hemispherical dome, supported by four pairs of pilasters. The interior is decorated with a painting from Francesc Tremulles representing the Holy Trinity and Mary. At the shells beneath the dome, this decoration is completed with figures of the Evangelists, painted by Miquel Llacuna. Regarding the exterior, it is covered with an octagonal dome. In the apse there is the altarpiece with the image of Saint Christ of Igualada, a reproduction of a 14th-century Gothic carving, which disappeared during the civil war. Two murals painted by Camps Dalmases evoke the miracle of Christ's blood sweat, which according to tradition took place in Igualada in 1590.

=== Main Altarpiece ===
The main altarpiece is possibly the most important element of the church. Although construction began in the 18th century, the work was not completed until the end of that century, due to the War of the Spanish Succession. This delay meant that the Baroque style of the initial project was offset by a certain classicism during the final execution. The altarpiece is the work of Jacint Morató and Josep Sunyer. During the civil war it was dismantled and partially destroyed. After the conflict, it was rebuilt under the direction of the well-known architect Cèsar Martinell. The most recent restoration of Santa Maria, in the 1980s, included cleaning work on the altarpiece.

The altarpiece of Santa Maria is considered the first major work of Catalan art made after the Succession War, and has three clearly differentiated levels. The center is dominated by the figure of the Immaculate Conception, carried by angels and located within a niche. At the sides, the Virgin Mary is flanked by figures of her parents, Saint Joachim and Saint Anne, under which there are medallions representing two passages from the life of the Virgin: the wedding and the Presentation of Mary. The image of the Virgin is crowned by a dove representing the Holy Spirit, on which there is a medallion with the Eternal Father. On the second floor of the altar there are images of Saint Roch and Saint Faust, linked to the traditional prayerbook of Igualada. Both figures are flanked by four musician angels, typical of the baroque imagery. Among them, the angel which plays the guitar is considered an almost unique specimen in the religious iconography of the period. At the upper floor, the altar is crowned by the figure of St. Bartholomew, patron of Igualada, the Sun and the gates of Jerusalem. Symbolically, all the altarpiece is sustained by four Atlas made of marble, representing the four seasons of the year. The side walls have two sculptural panels, crowned by the emblem of the city, representing the Epiphany and the adoration of the shepherds.

=== Organ ===
The organ is located at the upper floor of the church, under the rose window of the facade. It was built in the mid-18th century by Antoni Boscà. During the civil war it was moved to the Escolàpies convent, which was used as a concert hall during the conflict. It was restored in 1980 under the direction of master organ maker Gerhard Grenzing. It is considered one of the most notable organs in Catalonia, and this is why each year the basilica hosts an International Organ Festival.

=== Bell Tower ===
The bell tower was built in the 16th century during the Gothic period. With austere beauty, has decoration at the upper windows and some small arched windows. Its section is square and covered on all four sides. It has seven bells, and six of them, built in Germany, have been installed recently.

=== Other elements ===
Among the Atlas which are holding up the altar there are the two entries to the vestry, with the arms of the city above each one. The first side chapel, at the right side, has an allegorical painting of Segimon Ribó, which represents Christ's blood sweat in Igualada, which took place in 1590. The baptistery, of modernist aesthetics, is the work of Ignasi Colomer, and is located on the left of the entrance. The crypt beneath the chancel was built after the civil war, from a project of Cèsar Martinell. At the exterior of the main facade there are two plaques that commemorate the participation of Igualada citizens at the Battle of the Bruch.

The mixture of elements that make up Santa Maria is the result of various building stages and is the consequence of historical vicissitudes. A visit to the church is like a journey through the history of Igualada and the history of art.

== "Fulgentia" exhibition ==
Fulgentia is a permanent exhibition of religious art which can be visited at the basilica of Santa Maria. It has two areas: the left gallery of the triforium, where there are about 70 pieces displayed, and the store, an area which can not be visited, near the sacristy. Some of the pieces are among the best works of the Catalan goldsmith art.
