= Cartoixa d'Escaladei =

Ruined Carthusian monastery, Spain

Chapterhouse of Scala Dei
- Cartoixa d'Escaladei
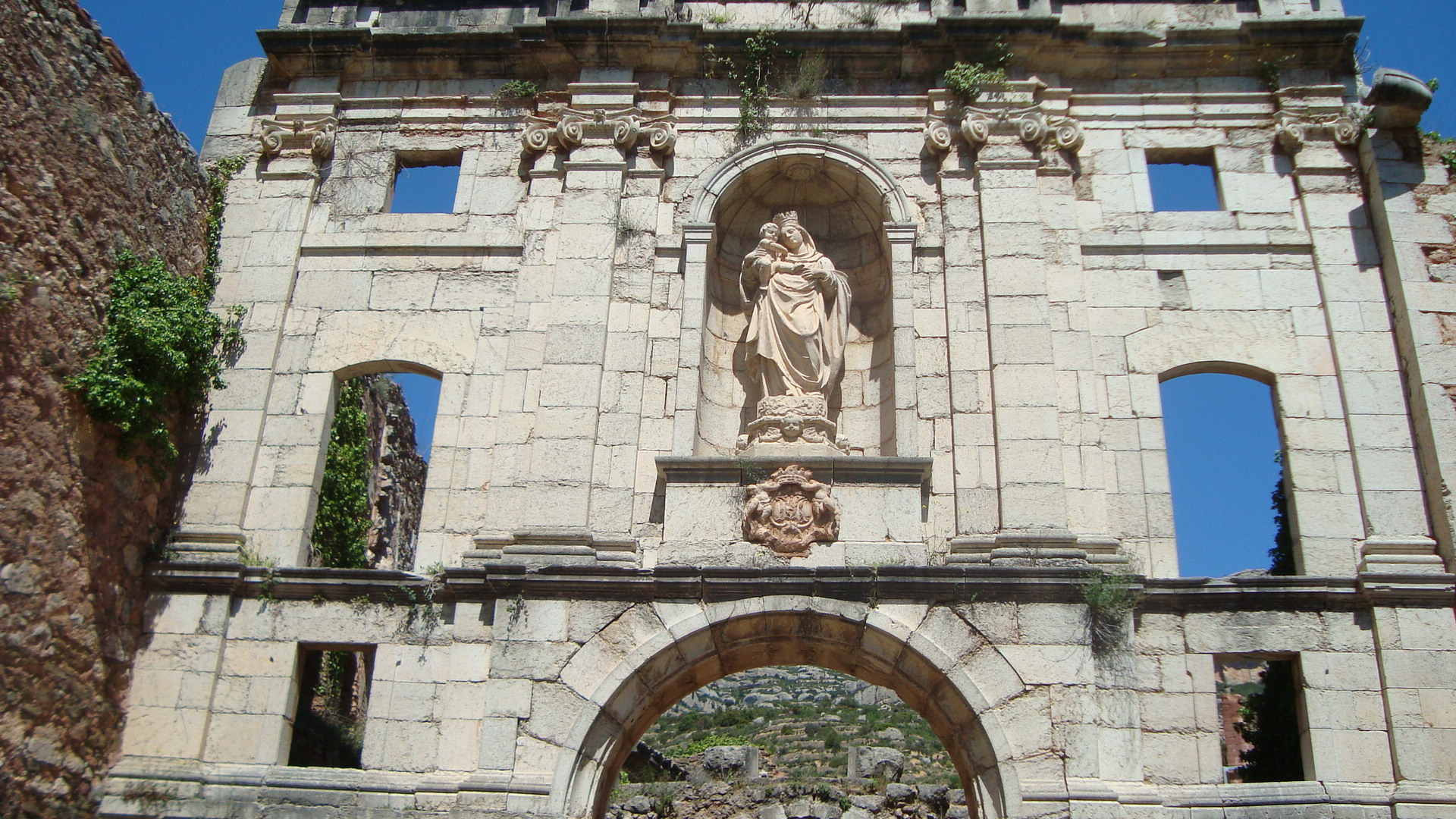
- Entrance to the monastery

- Location within Catalonia Location within Spain

Monastery information
- Order: Carthusian
- Established: 1194
- Disestablished: 1835
- Diocese: Tarragona

Architecture
- Functional status: ruined

Site
- Location: La Morera de Montsant, Serra de Montsant, Catalonia, Spain
- Coordinates: 41°15′24″N 0°48′36″E
- Public access: yes

Cartoixa d'Escaladei, or Chapterhouse of Scala Dei, was a monastery of the Carthusian order in the southern Catalonia. It was founded in the 12th century, was an important centre for art in the 17th century and started the planting of vines in the region that became later known as Priorat due to the vineyards of the monks.

== History ==
=== Foundation and early history ===
The monastery was established by king Alfonso II of Aragon as the first Carthusian monastery in the Iberian peninsula in 1194. The reason was the recent reconquest of the territory of Catalunya Nova from the Moors and for which the Aragonese kings needed to repopulate the territory. The location proved fitting for the community which was seeking silence, solitude and nature. According to legend, when the Carthusian monks came into the region they met shepherd who told them that he had seen in a vision angels ascending a stairway into heaven into the clouds of the summit of nearby Montsant.

By 1218 the monks were well established and were gifted by Jaume I dominion and jurisdiction over the nearby villages of La Morera, Gratallops, Torroja, Porrera, Poboleda and Vilella Alta. The monks introduced viticulture in this region, resulting in first vines in 1263, and the villages form today the wine region of Priorat. Scala Dei's patron saint became the founder of the Carthusian order, Saint Bruno of Cologne, whose feast day in the first week of October coincided the beginning of the vine harvest.

The earliest building of the monastery is the church of Santa Maria which was finished in 1228. Together with it were built a first cloister, called Maius, twelve cells for twelve monks and several other buildings. Thanks to the aid of prince and patriarch Joan of Aragon, the monastery could build another cloister in 1333 and build twelve additional cells, thus doubling in size. A third cloister with six cells was built in 1403 with donations from Berenguer Gallart, lord of Puigverd.

Though the community lived mostly in silence, it was also in contact with the outside world. The physician Arnaldus de Villa Nova dedicated one of his treatises to the prior and monks of Scala Dei and bequeathed some of his books to them upon his death in 1305. Alonso Tostado, a leading scholar of the 15th century, was a novice here in 1444 before he was called by king Juan II to become his advisor.

=== Early Modern History ===
In the 16th century a rebuilding programme begun which continued throughout the 17th and 18th century, giving the charterhouse a Baroque, Neoclassical appearance. During that time the charterhouse became an important regional artistic centre, notably among other for the Escaladei school of painting. Among those painters were friar Lluís Pascal, friar Ramón Berenguer (died 1660) and Joaquim Juncosa. The later became a lay friar at the monastery in 1660 and became one of the most famous painters of Catalan Baroque. Juncosa painted several portraits and frescoes at the monastery, unfortunately all of them were lost in the following events. The monastery became also became an important centre for books. For instance, one of the only two Catalan cookery manuscripts, El llibre de la Cuina de Scala-Dei, dates to the first half of the 17th century and the book Commentariam in Ieremiam Prophetam by Andrés Capilla (d.1610) was published here.

=== Demise and destruction ===
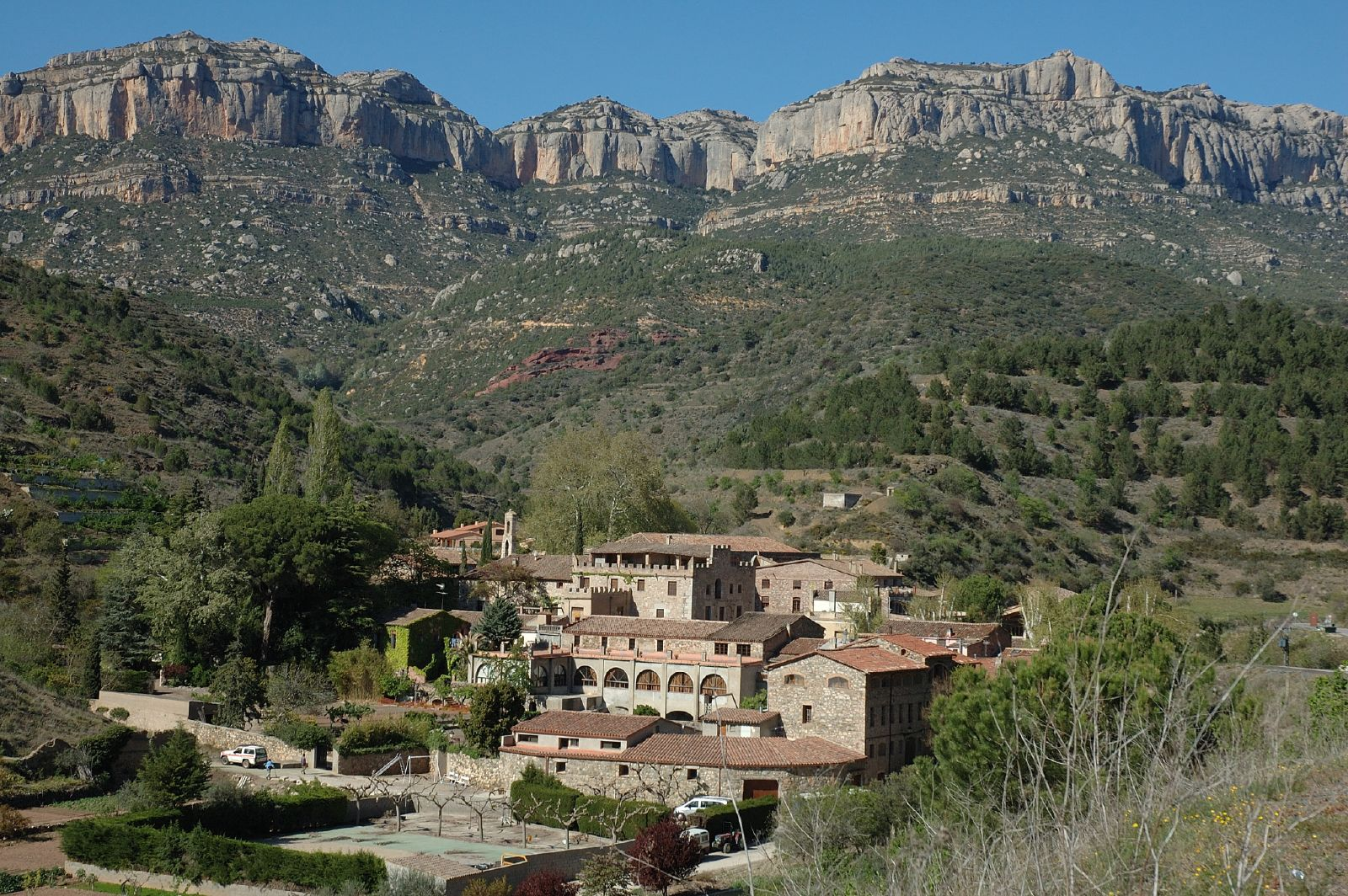

In 1835, following the decrees of Mendizábal for the seizure of monastic property, the community was forced to leave their home. In the surge of radical anticlericalism, revolutionary mobs, incited by liberal agitators, begun burning convents, starting first in Barcelona but also reaching monasteries in the country side such as the Cistercian monastery of Poblet, the Benedictine monastery of Sant Cugat and also Scala Dei. Only one day after the monks left, the monastery was sacked and a few days later it burned down. Thus, after just two years the conventual buildings were nearly entirely destroyed. The surviving buildings were sold at an auction in 1843 by five families who founded in 1844 a company to produce wine, the Sociedad Agrícola La Unión.

== Today ==
Since 1989 the ruins were donated by the former proprietors to the Catalan ministry of Culture. The monastery has been renovated in recent years and the ruins can now be visited.
