= Clos Mogador =

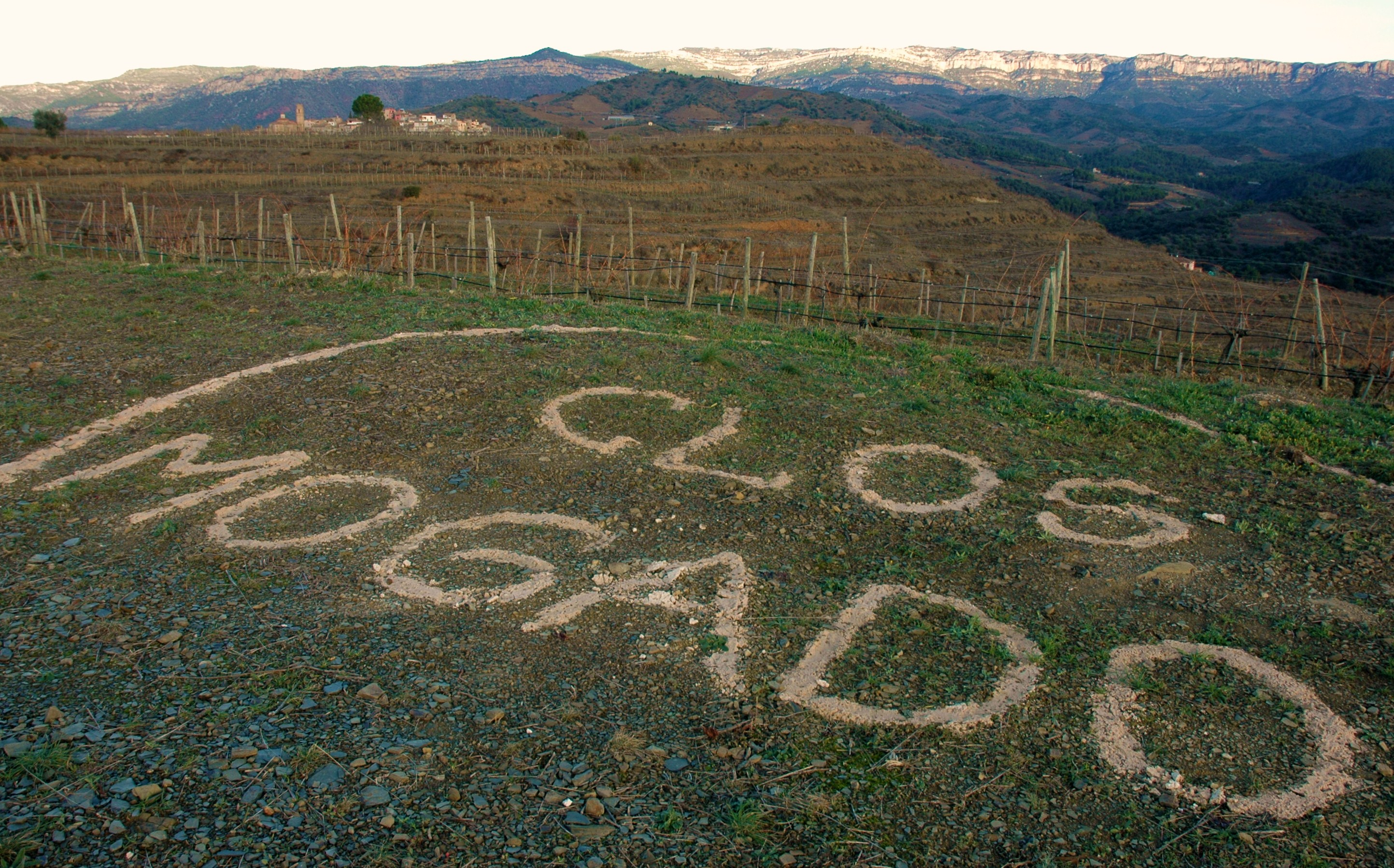
- Location: Gratallops, Catalonia, Spain
- Appellation: DOQ Priorat
- Founded: 1979
- First vintage: 1989
- Key people: René Barbier III, Isabelle Meyer, René Barbier IV, Owners
- Known for: Clos Mogador
- Varietals: Carignan, Grenache, Syrah, Cabernet Sauvignon
- Distribution: international
- Website: www.closmogador.com

Clos Mogador produces estate bottled wines in Gratallops, Catalonia, in the DOQ Priorat. Founded in 1979 by René Barbier III and his wife, Isabelle Meyer, the winery was part of a new wave of "Clos" wineries that released their first joint 1989 vintage to great acclaim. They have gone on to garner impressive scores by wine critics and have built up one of the most well-known brands in all of Priorat.

== History ==
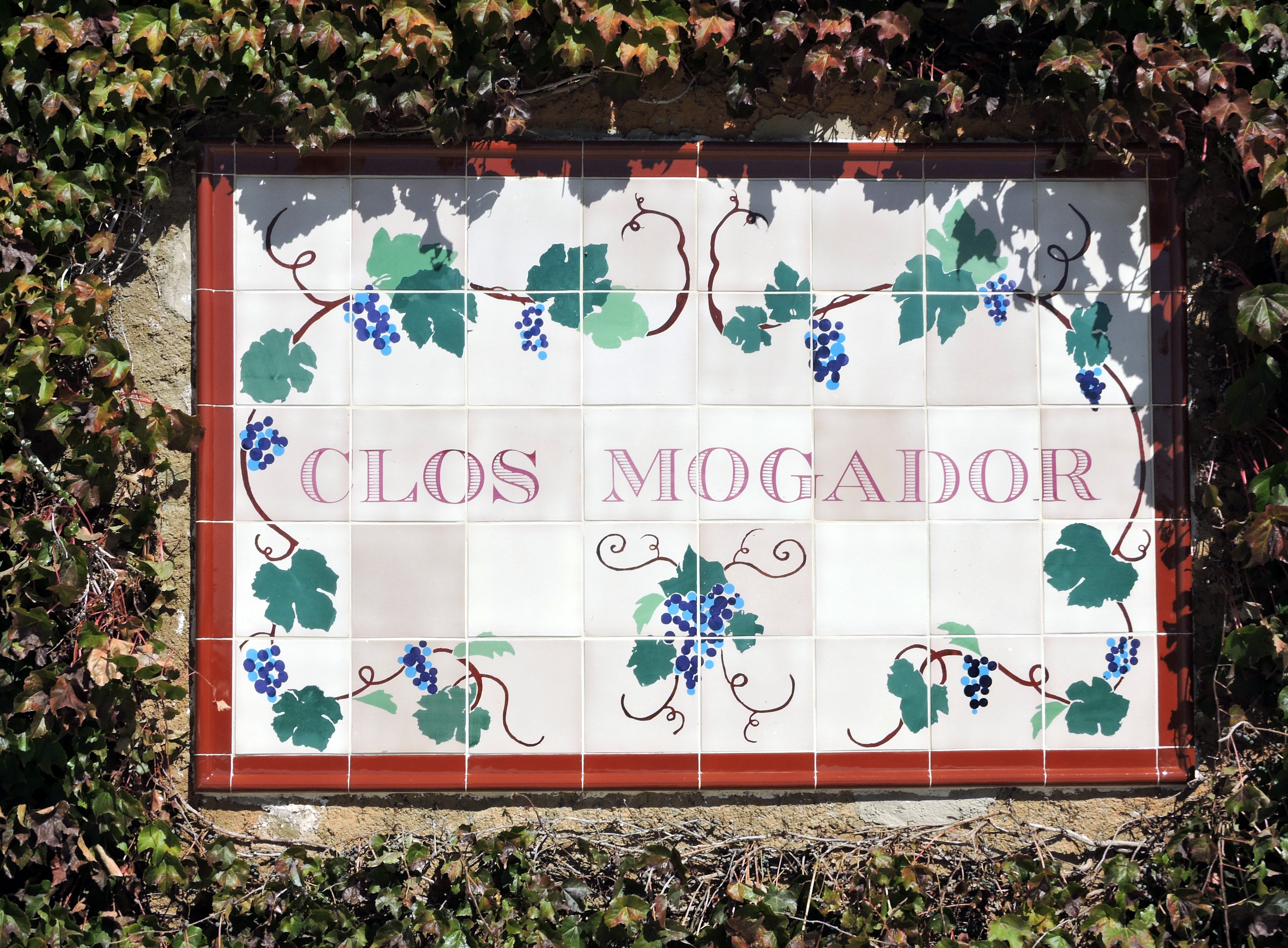

René Barbier III was descended from a family of French winemakers although he was born in Tarragona and grew up in Catalonia. Coming with his wife Isabelle Meyer and their young children to the Priorat region, he found a promising wine region that had for years been neglected although excellent wines had sometimes appeared such as the seminal 1974 vintage from Cellers de Scala Dei. This wine caught his and others attention and he was eventually able to gather a group to make a single wine together in the same cellar although released under different labels. There were initially 10 different labels which morphed in to the main five that are seen today. Ironically, despite being a defining wine for the region, at 12.5% alcohol it didn't qualify for DOQ certification as the minimum for a red wine is 13%.

In addition to their namesake Clos Mogador, with time they released a white wine called Nelin as well as another red called, Manyetes. The Clos Mogador was one of the first wines to be awards the "Vi de Finca" certification in Catalonia which signifies that it has been produced for over a decade from the same, single vineyard.

The name of the winery comes from "Les Gens de Mogador" ("The people of Mogador") which chronicles the rise and fall of a family from near Avignon in France on an imaginary estate called, Mogador and closely parallels the Barbier family history.

== See also ==
- Catalan wine
