= Clos Erasmus =

Winery in Catalonia, Spain

Clos Erasmus is a Catalan winery in the Priorat wine region. The wine is a blend of Grenache and Syrah grapes grown with biodynamic viticulture. The Clos Erasmus 2004 vintage was scored 100 points by influential wine critic Robert Parker and its average price is €975 per bottle. The 2013 Clos Erasmus is mostly Garnacha (Grenache) and 25% Syrah, fermented with indigenous yeasts and aged mostly in French oak barriques; it too received a perfect score from Robert Parker.

== History ==
Winemaker Daphne Glorian is originally from Switzerland and moved to Priorat in the 1990s after her 1988 purchase of 17 terraces after being persuaded by friends Alvaro Palacios and Rene Barbier. The winery eventually changed its name to Clos i Terrasses, referencing those terraces.
