= La Morera de Montsant =

- Municipality
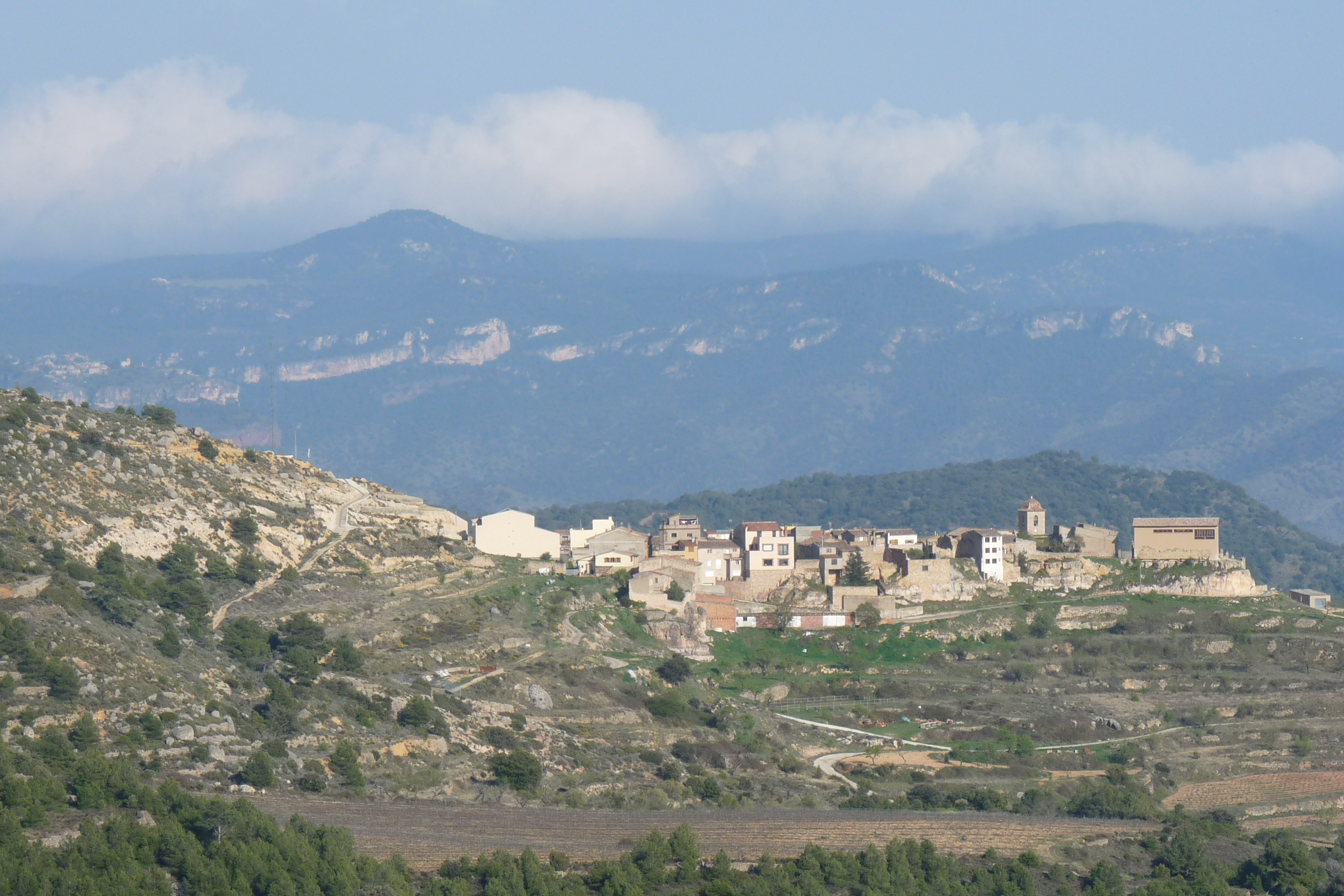
- View of La Morera de Montsant

- Coat of arms

- Location in Catalonia
- Coordinates: 41°16′1″N 0°50′35″E
- Country: Spain
- Community: Catalonia
- Province: Tarragona
- Comarca: Priorat

Government
  - Mayor: Ramon Antich Martí (2015)

Area
  - Total: 52.9 km^{2} (20.4 sq mi)

Population (2025-01-01)
  - Total: 150
  - Density: 2.8/km^{2} (7.3/sq mi)
- Website: lamorerademontsant.org

La Morera de Montsant (Catalan pronunciation: [la moˈɾeɾa ðe monˈsan]) is a village in the province of Tarragona and autonomous community of Catalonia, Spain. It has a population of 150 (register office, 2025).

== Geography ==
It is located in the mountainous wine-producing region of the Serra de Montsant thus named because there were many hermits living in the range in early Medieval times.

The municipality has two villages:

- La Morera de Montsant, the main population centre
- Escaladei, located by the Cartoixa d'Escaladei, a Carthusian Order monastery.
