= Joaquim Juncosa =

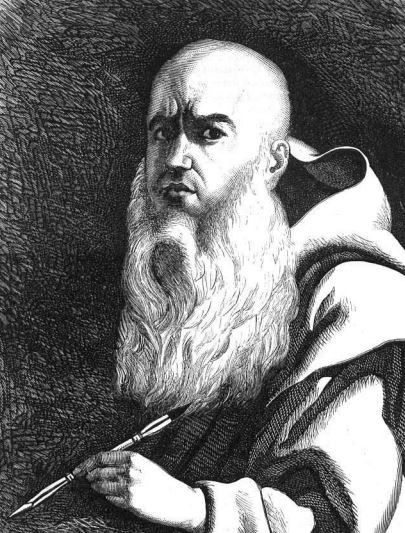

Joaquim Juncosa (1631 in Cornudella, Tarragona – 1708 in Rome) was a Spanish Baroque painter and monk of the Carthusian order at the monastery of Scala Dei.

== Biography ==
Born into a family of painters, he soon began to receive commissions, both from monasteries of the order he belonged to and from private residences. In 1660, he joined the Carthusian monastery of Scala Dei close to his home town. Out of these, four large mythological canvases stand out, commissioned by the marquis of la Guardia, governor of Sardinia.

Highly skilled at drawing, his works reflect a restrained Baroque style, and some experts have identified in it the influence of his stays in Rome and his contact with Roman painting trends.

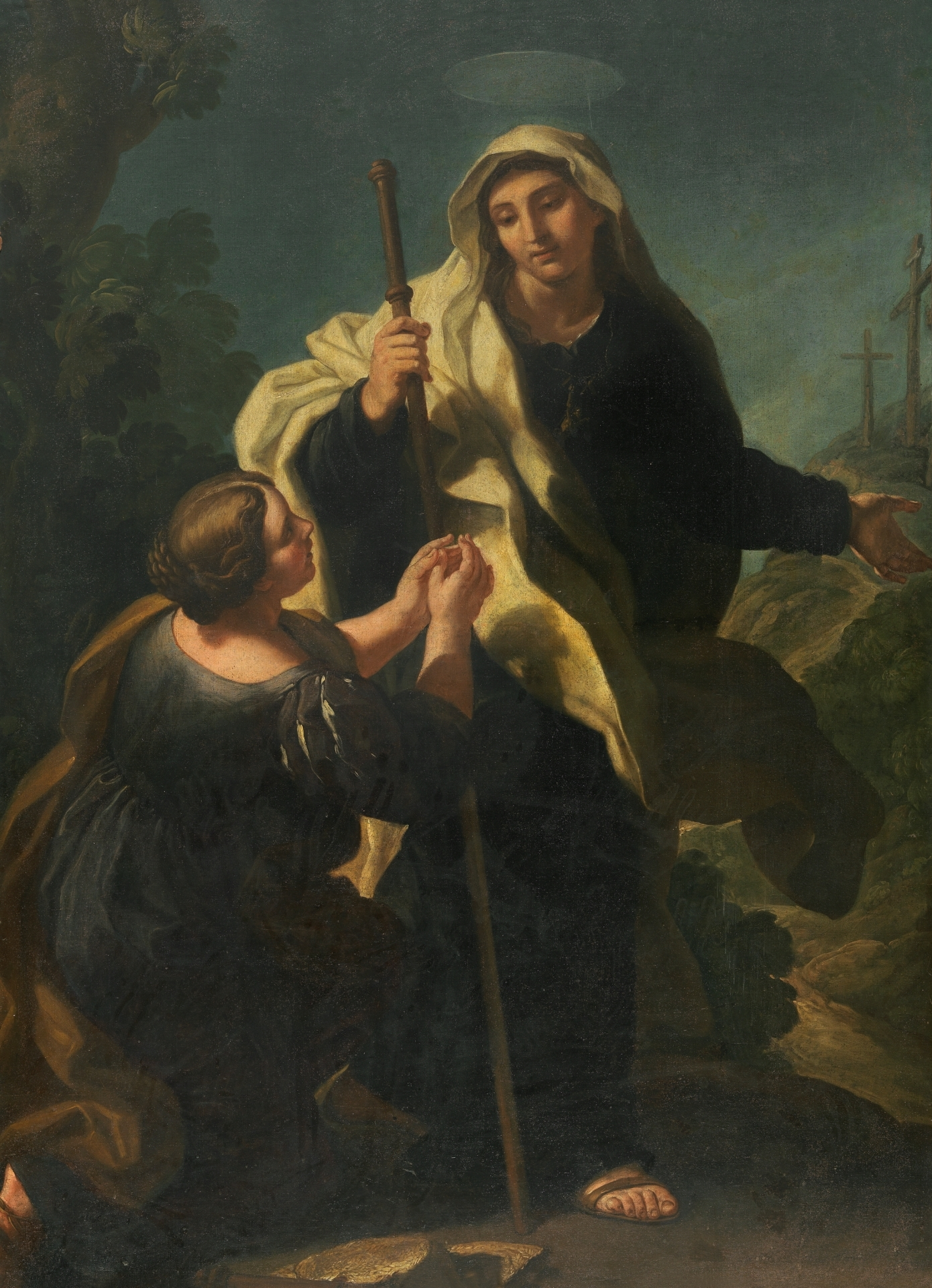
Santa Elena and her daughter, oil on linen (170 x 124 cm.), attributed to Joaquim Juncosa, Madrid, Museo del Prado.

== Artworks ==
The paintings and frescoes he painted at the monastery of Scala Dei were destroyed in 1835 in the wake of the Ecclesiastical confiscations of Mendizábal when the monastery was burned down during anti-clerical riots. Other documented works were destroyed in 1936 in the riots that occurred in the first few months of the Spanish Civil War, during which many religious buildings were damaged. In spite of that, some of his pieces are still preserved at the Sant Jordi Fine Arts Academy, in Barcelona, and in the Museo del Prado, in Madrid, among other collections, together with the twelve canvases that make up the set called “Mysteries of the Rosary”, located at the Carthusian monastery in Valldemossa (Majorca).
