= Gratallops =

- Municipality
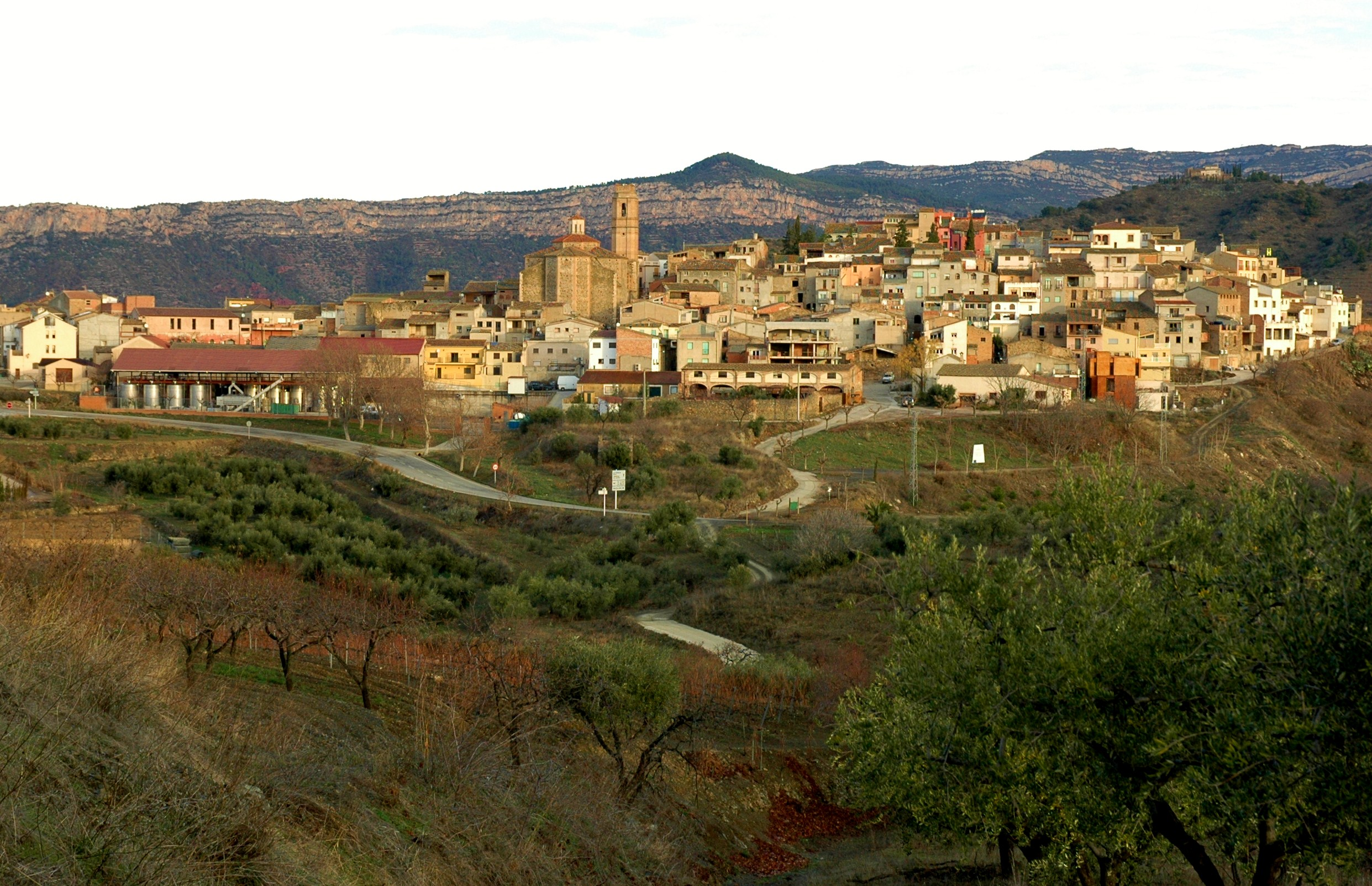
- Gratallops

- Coat of arms

- Location in Catalonia
- Coordinates: 41°11′42″N 0°46′41″E
- Country: Spain
- Community: Catalonia
- Province: Tarragona
- Comarca: Priorat

Government
  - Mayor: Xavier Gràcia Juanpere

Area
  - Total: 13.5 km^{2} (5.2 sq mi)
- Elevation: 301 m (988 ft)

Population (2025-01-01)
  - Total: 226
  - Density: 16.7/km^{2} (43.4/sq mi)
- Demonym: Gratallopenc
- Postal code: 43737
- Website: www.gratallops.altanet.org

Gratallops (Catalan pronunciation: [ˌgɾataˈʎops]) is a municipality in the comarca of the Priorat in Catalonia, Spain. It has a population of 226 (register office, 2025).

Gratallops has been a focal point for the reemergence of high-quality wines from the Priorat region. Within its borders, Gratallops lays claim to no less than 23 officially certified cellars including some of the most famous in Spain such as: Álvaro Palacios, Clos Mogador, Clos de l'Obac, Clos Erasmus, Mas Martinet and Devinssi Winery.

== Bibliography ==
- Panareda Clopés, Josep Maria; Rios Calvet, Jaume; Rabella Vives, Josep Maria (1989). Guia de Catalunya, Barcelona: Caixa de Catalunya. ISBN 84-87135-01-3 (Spanish). ISBN 84-87135-02-1 (Catalan).
