= Adoption (farming and cattle raising) =

Adoption (apadrinamiento in Spanish, apadrinament in Catalan, parrainage in French) of a farm plant or animal is a method of commercial sponsorship in the farming and cattle raising sector. Any kind of farm plant (like a grapevine, an olive tree, an orange tree, an almond tree, an apple tree) or animal (a cow, a sheep, a pig) can become an object of adoption.

In terms of emotions, adoption establishes friendship liaisons between the end consumers and the farming industry. Such sponsorship also makes economic sense since it consists of a back order, or advanced sale, of the crops (fruit, wine, vegetable oil) or animal produce (milk, eggs, meat) at a good value-for-money price, sometimes more affordable than market prices, due to a shorter, if not direct, distribution chain between the farmer and the consumer.

Such adoption is characterised by its mixed nature - it blends physical goods and intangible services. The service side often involves visits to the farm, participation in the productive tasks or regular newsletter updates on the plant's or animal's well-being.
