= Serra de Montsant =

Mountain range in Spain

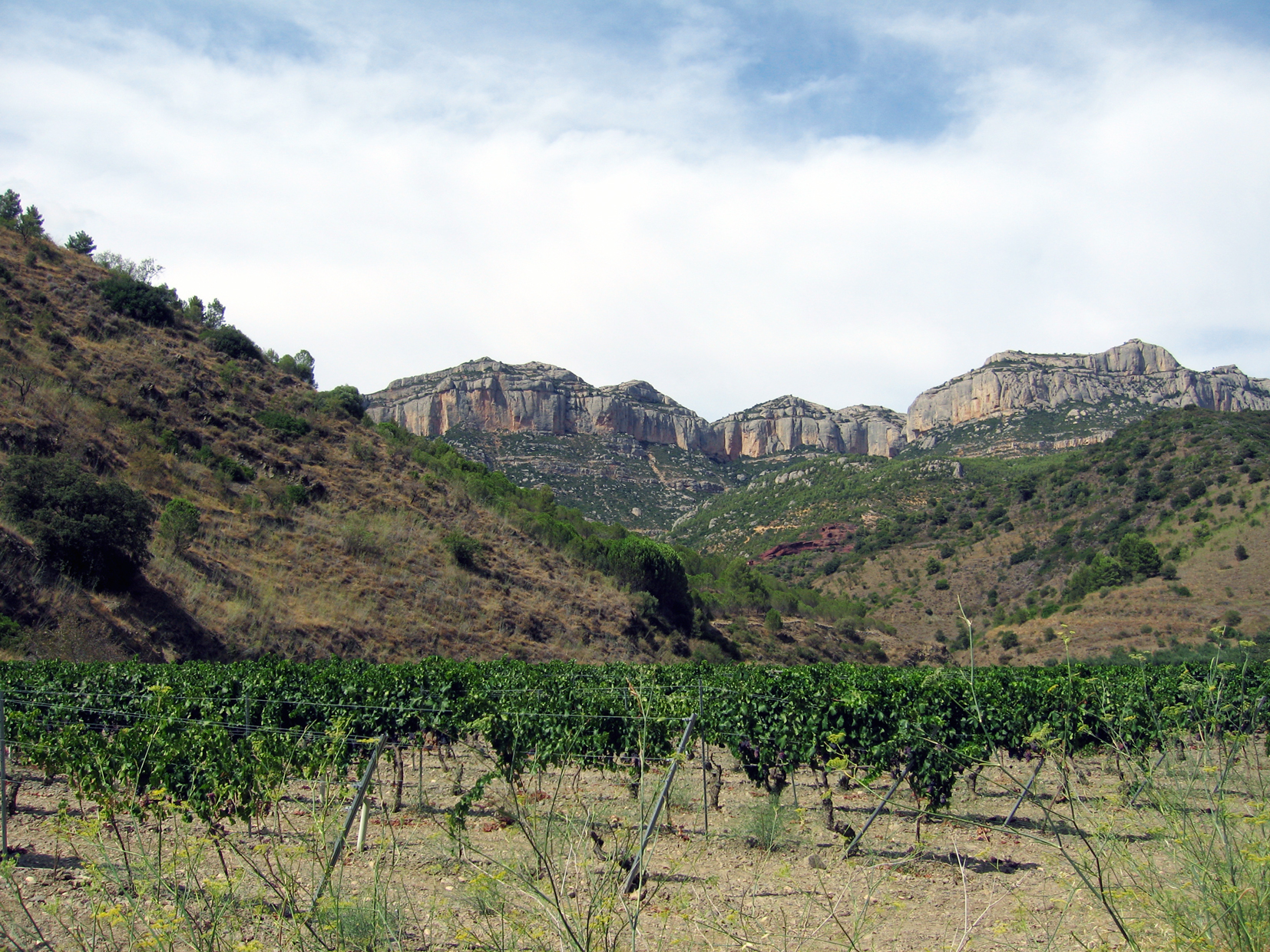
- Montsant cliffs towering above the winefields near Cartoixa d'Escaladei, a Carthusian Order monastery.

Highest point
- Elevation: 1,163 m (3,816 ft)
- Coordinates: 41°17′34.63″N 0°47′52.09″E

Geography
- Location: Priorat, (Catalonia)
- Parent range: Catalan Pre-Coastal Range

Geology
- Mountain type: Conglomerate

Serra de Montsant is a mountain chain in Catalonia, Spain. The main populated area in the range is La Morera de Montsant.

== Description ==
It is part of the Catalan Pre-Coastal Range. The main peaks are Roca Corbatera (1,163 m), Piló dels Senyalets (1,109 m) and la Cogulla (1,063 m). The Serra de Montsant, meaning 'Holy Mountain Range' is thus named because there were many hermits living in the range in early Medieval times.

The Montsant mountain range is currently a protected area, the Serra de Montsant Natural Park.

== Local wine ==
This mountain region is a famous red wine-producing zone; some of the best vineyards are located near the Cartoixa d'Escaladei, a Carthusian Order monastery. It gives its name to the Montsant wine-producing area.

== Panorama ==
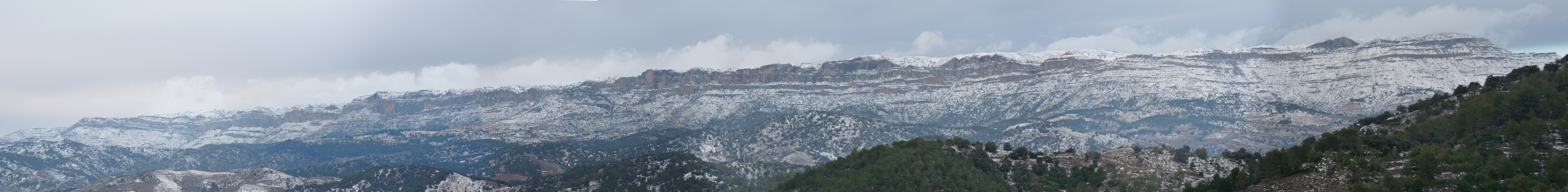
Serra de Montsant in winter; south face

== See also ==
- Montsant DO
- Catalan Pre-Coastal Range
- Parc Natural de la Serra de Montsant
- Mountains of Catalonia
