= Sant Miquel de Solterra =

Mountain in Spain

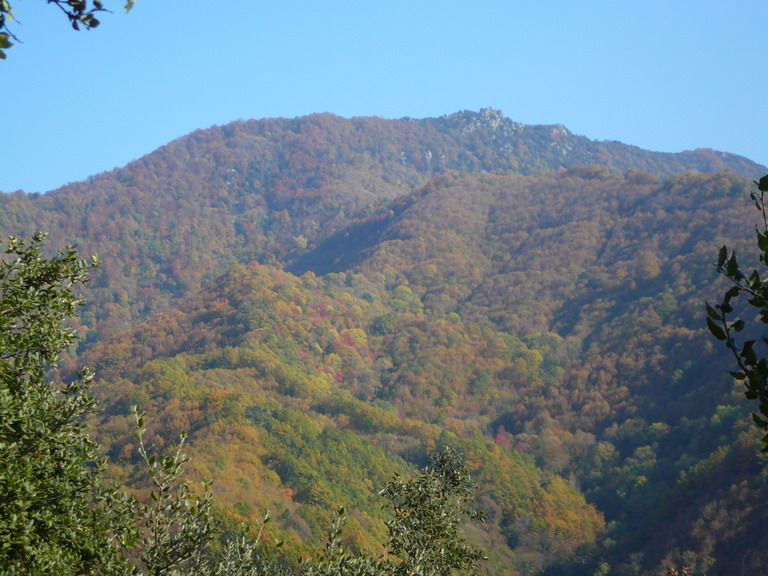

Highest point
- Elevation: 1,202 m (3,944 ft)
- Coordinates: 41°55′23.22″N 2°31′58.85″E

Geography
- Location: Selva, Catalonia
- Parent range: Guilleries

Climbing
- Easiest route: From Sant Hilari Sacalm or from Osor

Sant Miquel de Solterra or Sant Miquel de les Formigues is the highest mountain of the Guilleries Massif, Catalonia, Spain. It has an elevation of 1,201.9 metres above sea level.

== See also ==
- Guilleries
- Catalan Pre-Coastal Range
- Catalan Transversal Range
- Espai Natural de les Guilleries-Savassona
- Mountains of Catalonia
