= Montdois =

Mountain in Spain

Highest point
- Elevation: 928 m (3,045 ft)
- Listing: Mountains in Catalonia
- Coordinates: 41°58′43.58″N 2°28′48.80″E

Geography
- Location: Selva, Osona, Catalonia
- Parent range: Guilleries

Climbing
- Easiest route: From Rupit i Pruit or Susqueda

Montdois is a mountain of the Guilleries Massif, Catalonia, Spain. It has an elevation of 928.1 metres above sea level.
