= El Far (cim de Susqueda) =

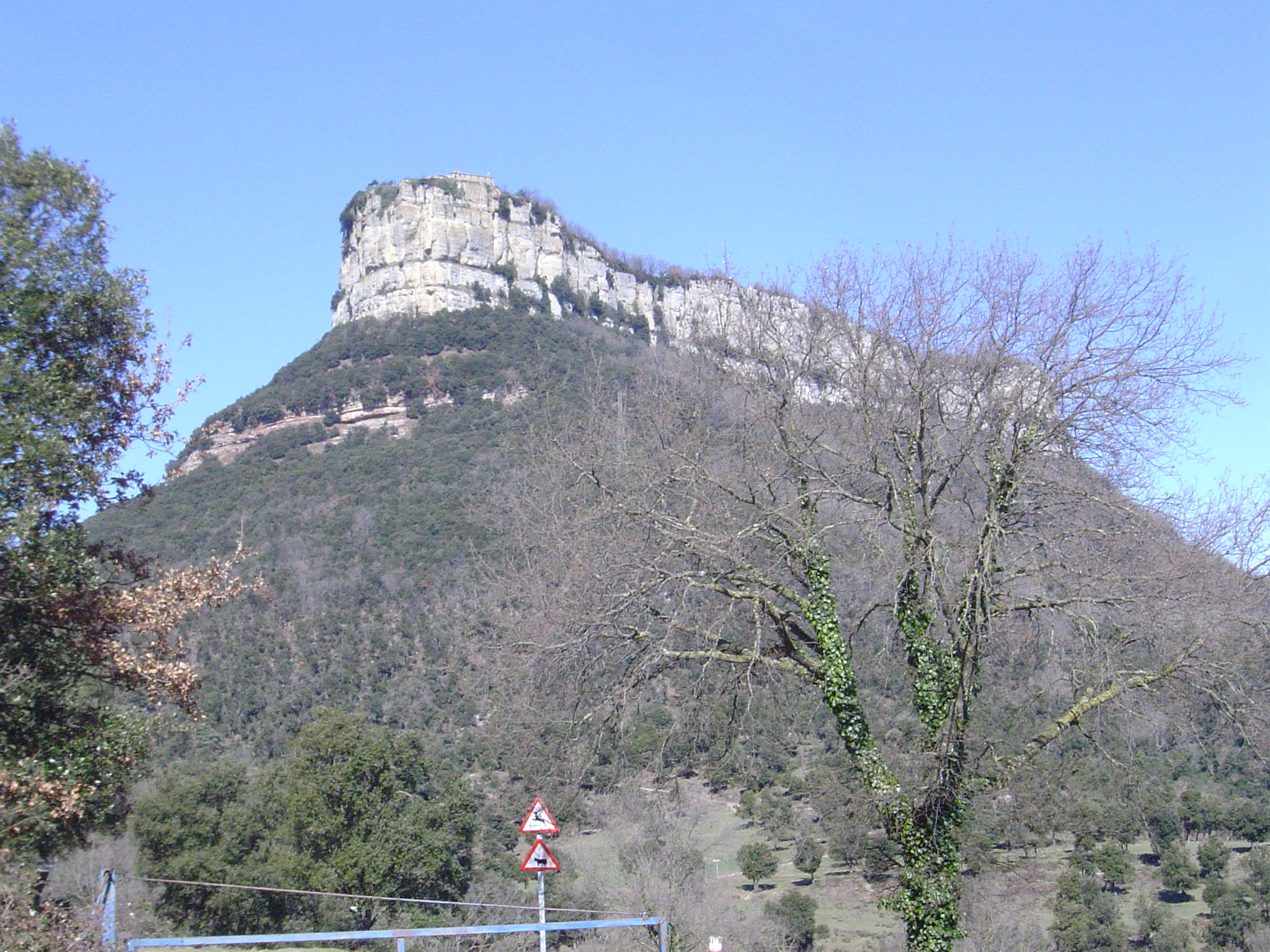

Highest point
- Elevation: 1,123 m (3,684 ft)
- Coordinates: 42°1′16.62″N 2°32′11.31″E

Geography
- Location: Selva, Catalonia, Spain
- Parent range: Guilleries

Climbing
- Easiest route: From Susqueda or Sant Martí Sacalm

El Far (cim de Susqueda) is a mountain of the Guilleries Massif, Catalonia, Spain. It has an elevation of 1,122.8 metres above sea level. There is a chapel up de mountain known as Santuari del Far.

== See also ==
- Guilleries
- Mountains of Catalonia
