= Sant Benet (Susqueda) =

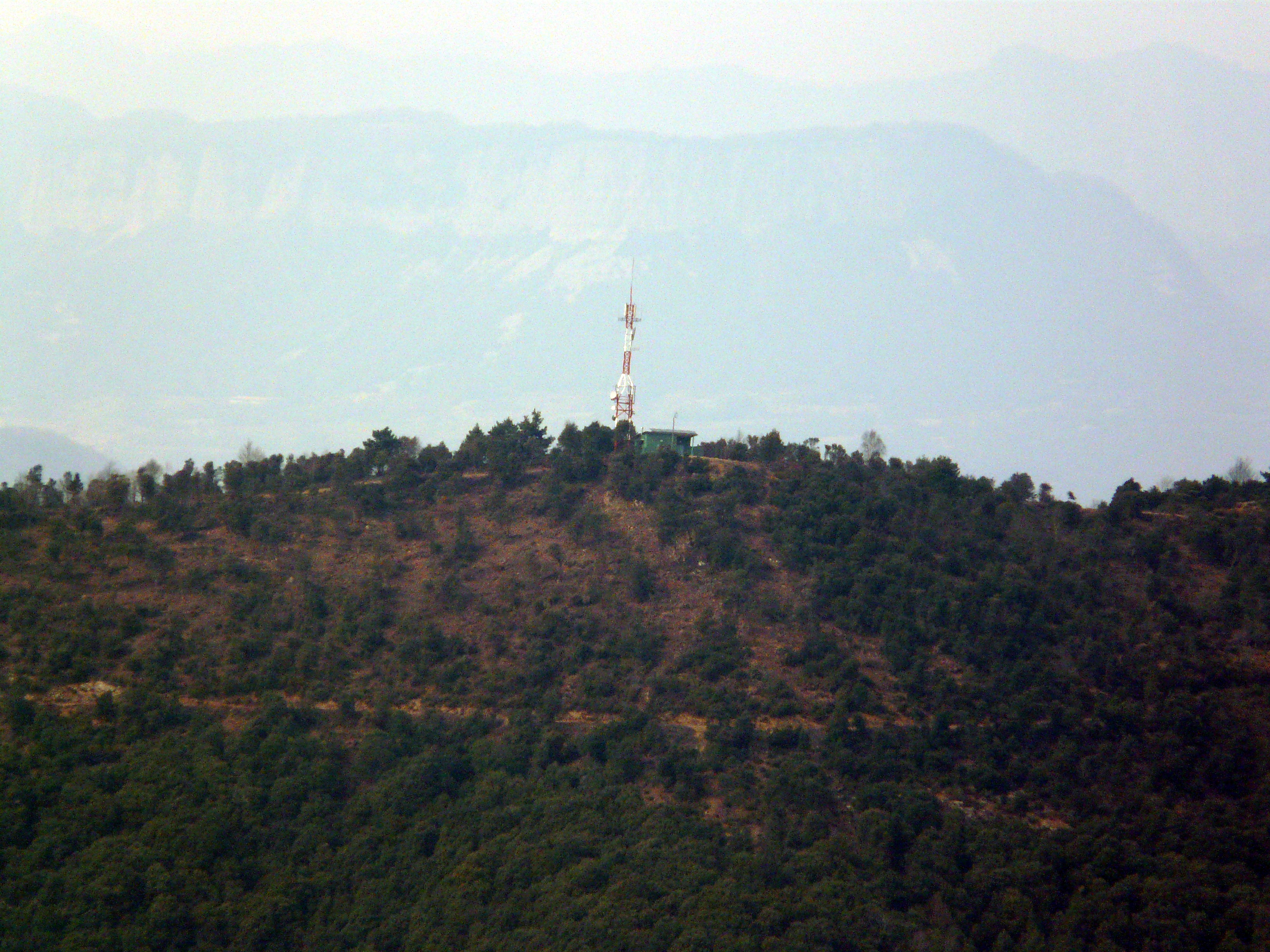
- The summit seen from Sant Miquel de Solterra.

Highest point
- Elevation: 1,147 m (3,763 ft)
- Coordinates: 41°56′59.69″N 2°30′50.60″E

Geography
- Location: Selva, Catalonia
- Parent range: Guilleries

Climbing
- Easiest route: From Susqueda

Sant Benet (Susqueda) is a mountain of the Guilleries Massif, Catalonia, Spain. It has an elevation of 1,146.9 metres above sea level.

== See also ==
- Guilleries
- Mountains of Catalonia
