= Josep Talleda Andreu =

Spanish murderer and suspected serial killer

- Born: June 18, 1941; Sant Hilari Sacalm, Spain
- Died: November 22, 2012 (aged 71); Terrassa Health Consortium, Terrassa, Spain
- Convictions: Murder x2 Sexual battery on minors
- Penalty: 20 years (first murder); 15 years (second murder)

Details
- Victims: 2–4
- Span of crimes: 1987 – 2003; 1978 – 2003 (suspected)
- Country: Spain
- State: Catalonia
- Date apprehended: April 20, 2003

Josep Talleda Andreu (June 18, 1941 – November 22, 2012) was a Spanish murderer, child molester and suspected serial killer convicted of two murders in Catalonia, occurring in 1987 and 2003, respectively. Imprisoned for these charges, he was considered the prime suspect in one other murder and a disappearance, for which he was never charged. He died in a prison hospital in 2012, following an undisclosed illness.

== First murder ==
Talleda, a turner who operated a workshop in his hometown of Sant Hilari Sacalm, first came under the police's radar in the mid-1980s, after the body of 14-year-old Montserrat Ávila, who vanished on July 11, 1987, was found on a dirt road not far from the town. She had been shot in the back of the head, and showed bruises corresponding to violent beatings prior to her death. Talleda denied culpability, and since there was a lack of evidence for an arrest, he was let off the hook. The case remained a mystery until the mid-1990s, when Ávila's sister, who had overcome her fear of revealing the abuse, went to the police and claimed that both she and Montserrat were lured to Talleda's workshop with the promises of gifts, only for him to force them to masturbate under the threat of murder. After this, authorities obtained a search warrant and combed through the workshop, locating physical evidence that confirmed the girl's account. While Talleda continued to claim that he was innocent, he was nevertheless charged with manslaughter and child abuse, for which he was duly convicted and sentenced to 20 years imprisonment. During the trial, both psychiatrists and police officers alike emphasized that the convict was a cold, calculated killer who likely would reoffend.

== Release and second murder ==
Despite their warnings, Talleda's sentence was reduced following reforms to the Criminal Code, allowing him to be released on probation in 1998, with the process lasting two years before all surveillance on him seized in 2000. Per court order, Talleda was forbidden from returning to Sant Hilari Sacalm, and instead settled in an apartment flat in Girona. Over the next three years, no violent crime was definitively linked to him.

On April 20, 2003, the lifeless body of 22-year-old Albanian prostitute Vjolka "Ana" Papa, stuck in the fetal position and stuffed in a bag, was found floating in the Güell by a boy photographing ducks. She had been violently beaten, and her throat had been slit. Shortly before, Talleda had gone to the police station to report an assault by Papa's boyfriend, Rudolf. However, after noticing contradictions in his statements, as well as mysterious stab wounds on his hands, he was eventually arrested as a suspect in the woman's murder. Officers were dispatched to search his apartment, finding numerous blood particles on the floor, as well as ropes and plastic bags identical to those used on the body. Additionally, it was determined that Talleda had killed Papa sometime around April 1, he had kept her body in his freezer until April 19, before he transported it in a shopping cart and dumped it in the river. His attorney attempted to convince the judge and jury that since his client lived with his wife and two daughters, it would have been impossible for them not to notice the body, and instead suggested that Papa had been killed by intruders while in Talleda's flat. In addition, he claimed that it would have been very hard for Talleda, a diabetic suffering from dizzy spells, to physically lift up the woman's body. These arguments were thrown out, however, and Talleda was sentenced to 15 years imprisonment for the Papa killing.

=== Suspected murders ===
Aside from his two confirmed murders, Talleda was designated the prime suspect in two others: the first was the 1978 disappearance of Francisca Boix, a neighbor who often visited his workshop in Sant Hilari Sacalm. This was suggested shortly after his conviction for the Ávila murder, as her sister mentioned in her testimony that he brought the two girls to the Susqueda Reservoir to pray and leave flowers.

The second was the murder of Maria Teresa Rubio, whose body was found by the roadside in Vilanova del Vallès in late 2001, en route to Talleda's workplace. Her identity was unknown at first, and she was positively identified via DNA six years later. Rubio, the wife of Talleda's former cellmate, was last seen accompanying him on January 11, 2001. In spite of the suspicious circumstances, he was not charged at the time due to the lack of a body.

== Death ==
Talleda, who never confessed to any of the crimes, was remanded to the Centre Penitenciari Brians 1 in Sant Esteve Sesrovires following his second conviction. He remained there until 2012, when he was transported to the Terrassa Health Consortium, where he succumbed to an illness on November 22, 2012, aged 71.

== In the media and culture ==
- Talleda's case was covered in the 2011 book 501 crims que has de conèixer abans de morir, by author Sebastià Bennasar Llobera
- He was the subject of a two-part documentary by the Catalan radio and television program Crims, airing on February 24 and March 2, 2020, respectively
