= Sant Gregori (la Cellera de Ter) =

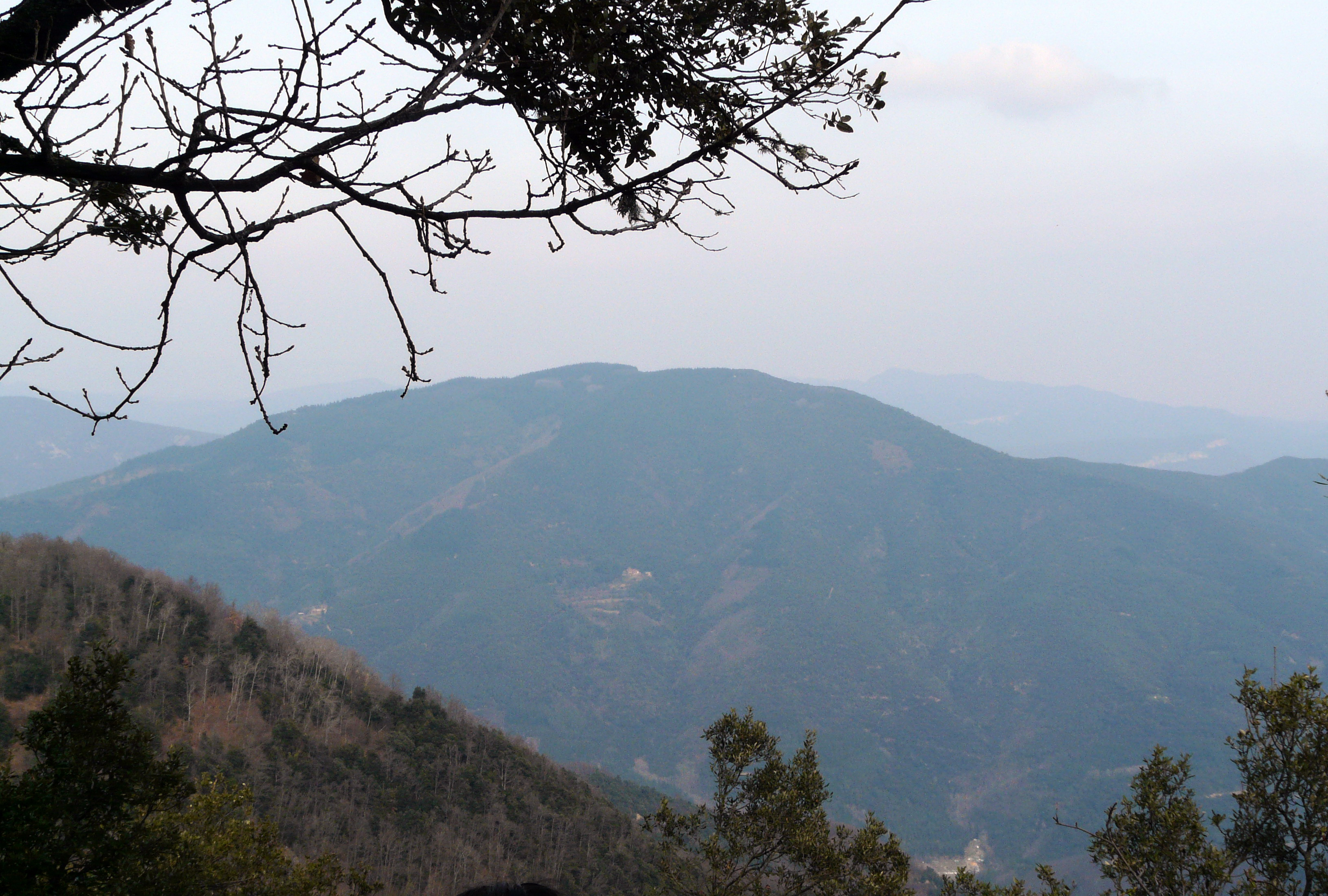
- Sant Gregori seen from near Sant Miquel de Solterra, in winter.

Highest point
- Elevation: 1,091 m (3,579 ft)
- Coordinates: 41°57′52.44″N 2°34′15.60″E

Geography
- Location: Selva, Catalonia
- Parent range: Guilleries

Climbing
- Easiest route: From Osor or La Cellera de Ter

Sant Gregori (la Cellera de Ter) is a mountain of the Guilleries Massif, Catalonia, Spain. It has an elevation of 1,090.8 metres above sea level.

== See also ==
- Guilleries
- Mountains of Catalonia
