= Turó del Castell (Tavertet) =

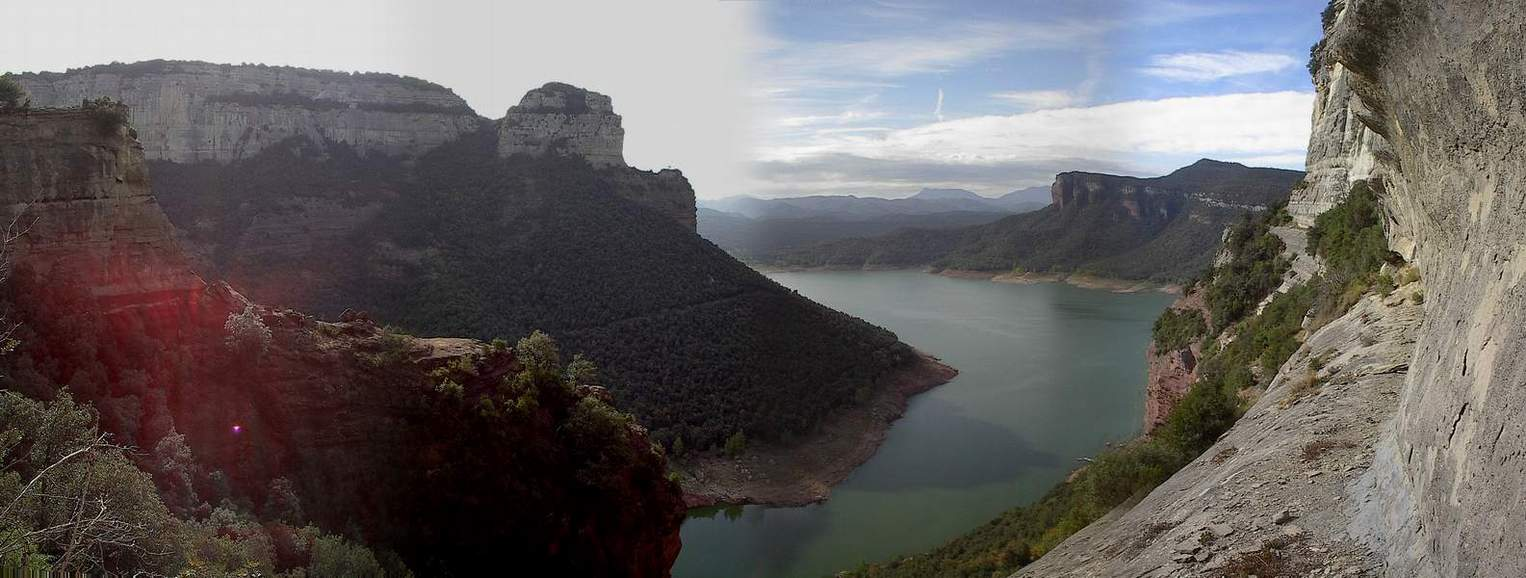
- Turó del Castell, Puig de la Força and the Susqueda dam

Highest point
- Elevation: 851 m (2,792 ft)
- Listing: Mountains in Catalonia
- Coordinates: 41°58′59.06″N 2°23′46.65″E

Geography
- Location: Osona, Catalonia
- Parent range: Guilleries

Climbing
- Easiest route: From Tavertet

Turó del Castell is a mountain of the Guilleries Massif, Catalonia, Spain. It has an elevation of 851.1 metres above sea level. The Susqueda reservoir lies off the southern slopes of the mountain. The high plateau lying ENE of the mountain is known as Pla del Castell. A rocky outcrop known as Puig de la Força (739 m) rises WSW of the summit.
