= Guilleries =

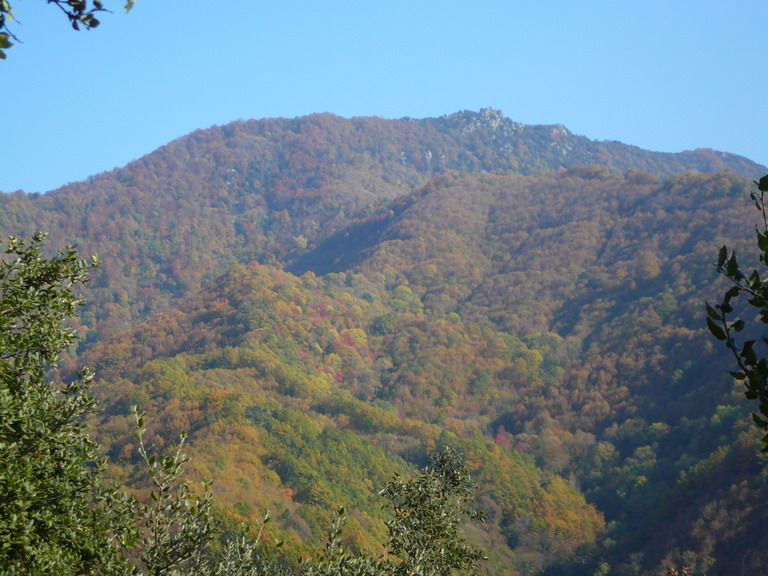
- Sant Miquel de Solterra

Highest point
- Elevation: 1,202 m (3,944 ft)
- Coordinates: 41°56′34.93″N 2°24′49.39″E

Geography
- Location: Selva, Catalonia
- Parent range: Catalan Pre-Coastal Range and Catalan Transversal Range

Geology
- Mountain type: Metamorphic rock

Climbing
- Easiest route: From Sant Hilari Sacalm or from Osor

Guilleries Massif location.

The Guilleries Massif (Catalan: Les Guilleries) is a mountain system located at the apex of the Catalan Transversal Range and the Pre-Coastal Range. The highest point of the range is Sant Miquel de Solterra or Sant Miquel de les Formigues (1.204 m), other main peaks are Turó del Faig Verd (1,187 m), Rocallarga (1,187 m), Sant Benet (1,149 m), El Far (1,111 m), Sant Gregori (1 ,094 m), Montdois (930 m), L'Agullola (921 m) and Turó del Castell (851 m)

The Guilleries is one of the few places in the Catalan Mediterranean System where amphibolite facies conditions are found. The Pantà de Susqueda and Pantà de Sau reservoirs, of great importance for Barcelona metropolitan water supply, are located in the Guilleries area.

These mountains were notorious in former times for being a haunt of bandits and highwaymen.

The main towns in the Guilleries area are Sant Hilari Sacalm, Osor, Susqueda, Vilanova de Sau, Sant Sadurní d'Osormort, Espinelves and Viladrau.

== See also ==
- Catalan Pre-Coastal Range
- Catalan Transversal Range
- Espai Natural de les Guilleries-Savassona
