= Rocallarga =

Mountain in Catalonia, Spain

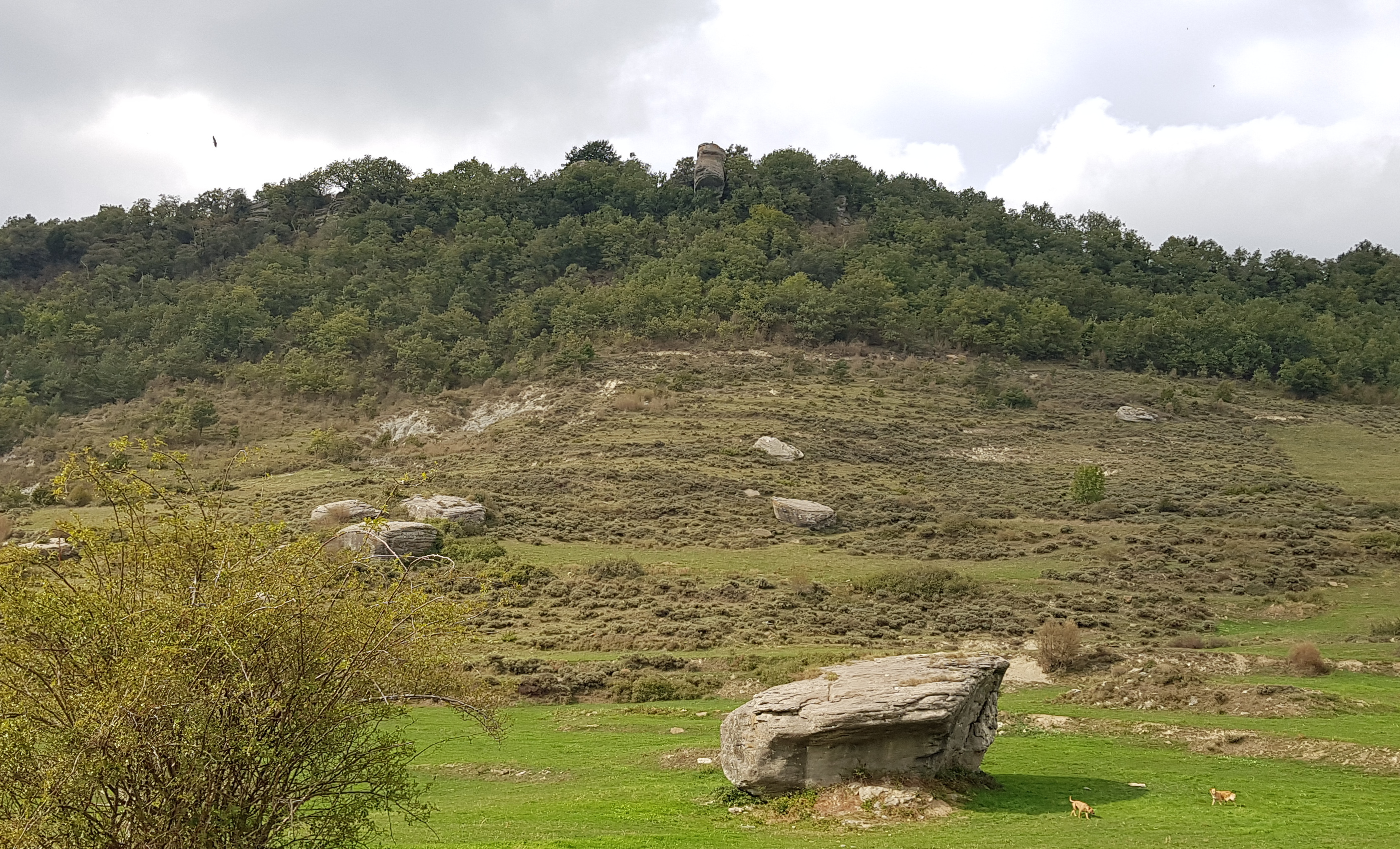

Highest point
- Elevation: 1,187 m (3,894 ft)
- Listing: Mountains of Catalonia
- Coordinates: 42°0′35.23″N 2°26′44.40″E

Geography
- Location within Catalonia
- Location: Osona, Catalonia
- Parent range: Guilleries

Climbing
- Easiest route: From Tavertet

Rocallarga is a mountain of the Guilleries Massif, Catalonia, Spain. It has an elevation of 1,186.5 metres (3,893 ft) above sea level.
