= Vilobí d'Onyar =

- Municipality
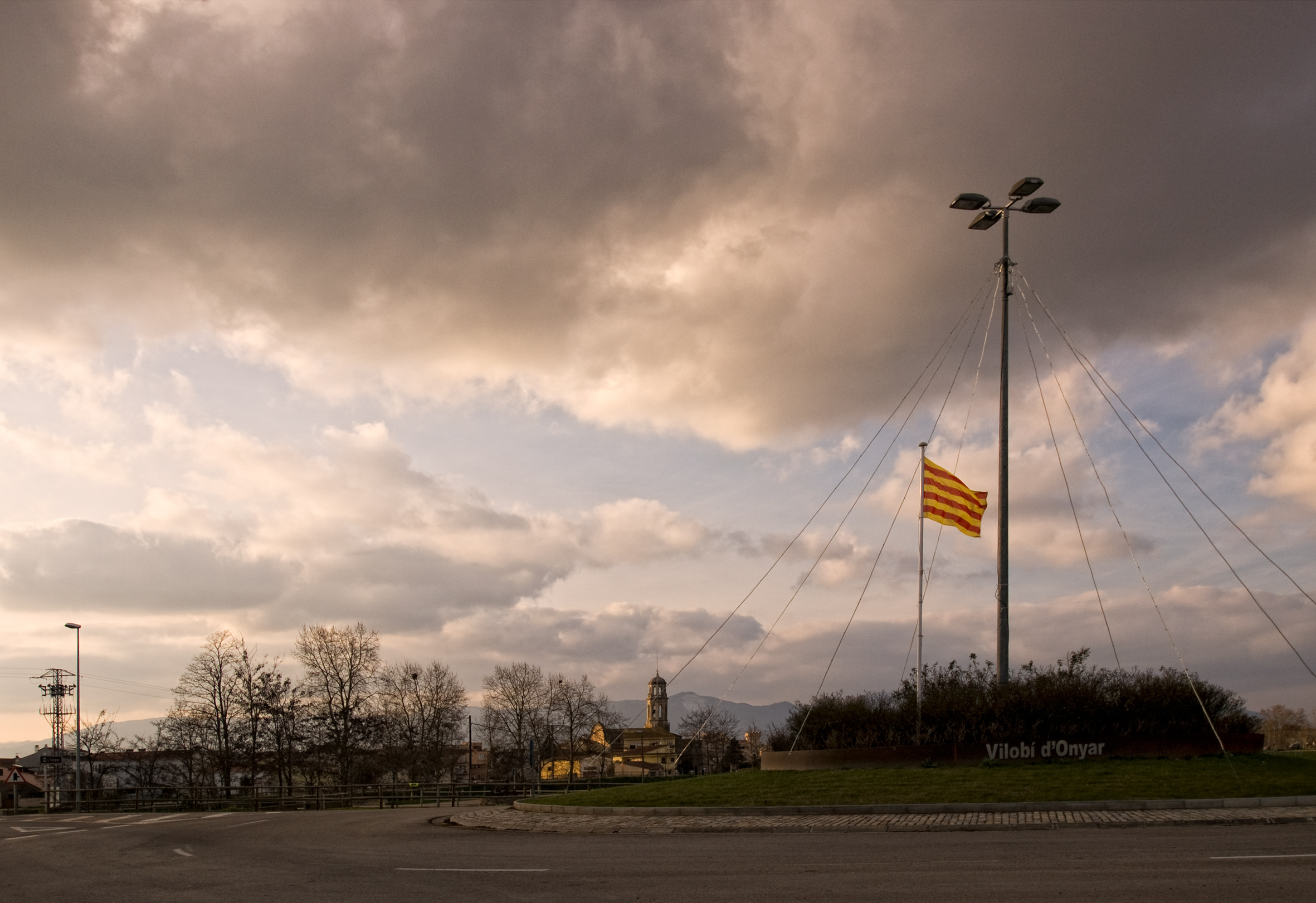
- Vilobí d'Onyar

- Coat of arms

- Location in Catalonia Vilobí d'Onyar (Spain)
- Coordinates: 41°53′20″N 2°44′33″E
- Country: Spain
- Community: Catalonia
- Province: Girona
- Comarca: Selva

Government
  - Mayor: Cristina Mundet Benito (2015)

Area
  - Total: 32.6 km^{2} (12.6 sq mi)
- Elevation: 148 m (486 ft)

Population (2025-01-01)
  - Total: 3,297
  - Density: 101/km^{2} (262/sq mi)
- Demonym(s): Vilobinenc, vilobinenca
- Website: vilobidonyar.cat

Vilobí d'Onyar (Catalan pronunciation: [biluˈβi ðuˈɲa]) is a municipality in the comarca of the Selva in Catalonia, Spain. It is situated in the valley of the Onyar river, on the GE-533 road between Santa Coloma de Farners and Riudellots de la Selva. A substantial part of the northern portion of the municipality is taken up by Girona-Costa Brava Airport.

== Demography ==
1900	1930	1950	1970	1986	2007
1103	1765	1707	1564	1924	2756

== Notable people ==
- Ferrán Corominas, former footballer
- Jordi Matamala, former footballer
