= Riells =

Riells may refer to the following places in Catalonia, Spain:

- Riells i Viabrea, municipality in the comarca of Selva
- Riells (L'Escala), locality in the municipality of L'Escala (Alt Empordà)
- Bigues i Riells, municipality in the comarca of Vallès Oriental
