= Sant Feliu =

Sant Feliu (Catalan from Saint Felix) may refer to:

- Sant Feliu de Buixalleu, village in the province of Girona
- Sant Feliu de Codines, municipality in the comarca of the Vallès Oriental
- Sant Feliu de Guíxols, municipality in the comarca of the Baix Empordà
- Sant Feliu de Llobregat, capital of the comarca of Baix Llobregat
- Sant Feliu de Pallerols, village in the province of Girona
- Sant Feliu Sasserra, municipality in the comarca of Bages
