= Santa Coloma de Farners =

- Municipality
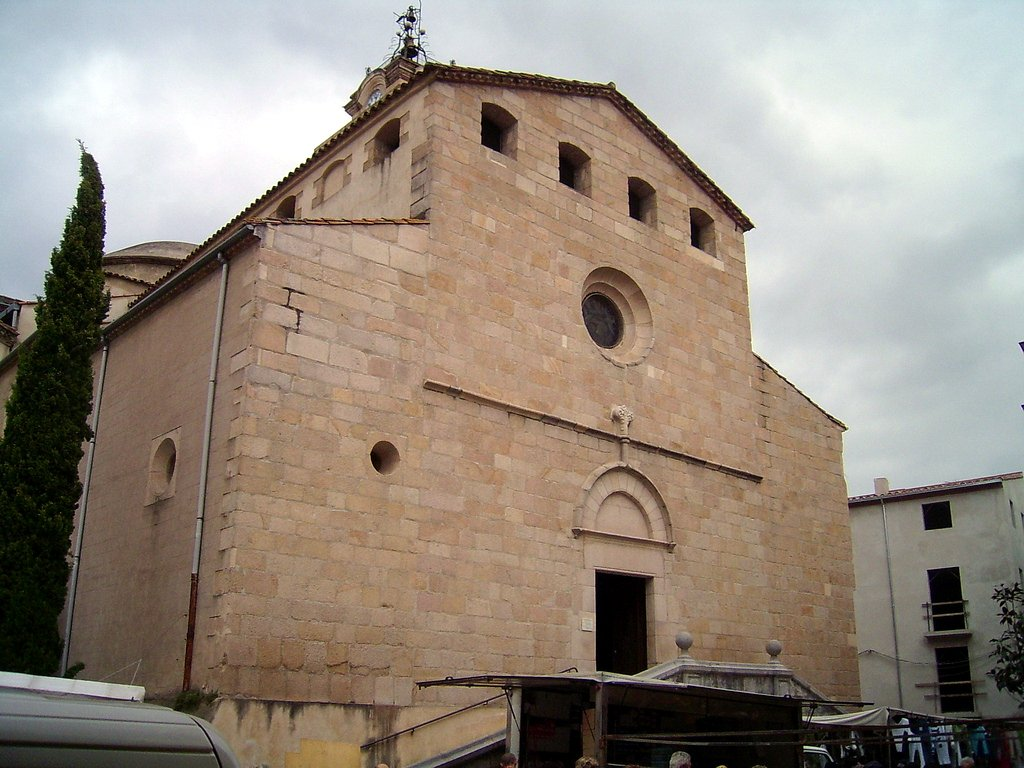
- Parish church

- Flag Coat of arms

- Location in Catalonia Santa Coloma de Farners (Spain)
- Coordinates: 41°51′53″N 2°39′51″E
- Country: Spain
- Community: Catalonia
- Province: Girona
- Comarca: Selva

Government
  - Mayor: Q136450610 (Junts per Catalunya)

Area
  - Total: 70.6 km^{2} (27.3 sq mi)
- Elevation: 142 m (466 ft)

Population (2025-01-01)
  - Total: 13,993
  - Density: 198/km^{2} (513/sq mi)
- Demonym(s): colomenc, colomenca
- Climate: Cfa
- Website: scf.cat

Santa Coloma de Farners (Catalan pronunciation: [ˈsantə kuˈlomə ðə fəɾˈnes]) is a spa town and capital of the comarca of the Selva, in Catalonia, Spain, and of the judicial district of Santa Coloma. It is situated on the edge of the Selva Depression and of the Guilleries. The local economy is mainly commercial, given the status of the town as capital of the comarca, although summer tourism, agriculture and forestry products also contribute. The urban centre is to the north and west of the main modern communication routes, although the C-253 road links the town with the main N-II route and the AP-7 autopista and to the Renfe railway station at Sils (10 km). The GE-533 runs through the northern part of the municipality, linking it with Vic to the west and with Riudellots de la Selva, Vilobí d'Onyar and Girona-Costa Brava Airport to the east.

The town dates from at least 898, when the church is mentioned for the first time. Destroyed during the course of the Magyar invasion of 942, it was rebuilt in 950. During the Middle Ages it was under the ecclesiastical control of the Monastery of Sant Pere Cercada and the civil control of Farners Castle. A market was established by a charter of King Peter IV of Aragon in 1334, and an independent barony was created in the 15th century, held by the Vilademany family.

In the town of Santa Coloma, notable monuments include the Gothic Church of Santa Coloma (whose current structure dates from the 14th century), the Plaça de Farners and the Thermal Baths of Orion (Balneari Termes-Orion). The 12th-century castle is six kilometres to the west of the urban centre (within the municipal boundaries): the adjoining Santuari de la Mare de Déu de Farners (Sanctuary of the Mother of God) houses a noted state of Mary, the mother of Jesus. The Roman-styled Monastery of Sant Pere Cercada is three kilometres further on from the castle.

Santa Coloma has always played an important role with regard to forests, being an area of intensive production and of considerable political influence with regard to the regional forest policy. It is host to the Catalan Forestry House, where the most representative forestry-related organisations of Catalonia share offices: the Consorci Forestal de Catalunya, one of the oldest agrarian organisations of Catalonia, representing the interests of the private forest owners, the Fundació Boscos, a private foundation dedicated to the dissemination of cultural and educational values around forests, ARCMED, the federation of Mediterranean foresters, an organisation represented in Brussels to represent over 600.000 forest owners from 7 Mediterranean countries, and the leading forestry research centre of Catalonia, the Forest Sciences Centre of Catalonia (CTFC).

== Demography ==
1900	1930	1950	1970	1986	2001
5041	4691	4754	5830	7582	9169
