= L'Agullola =

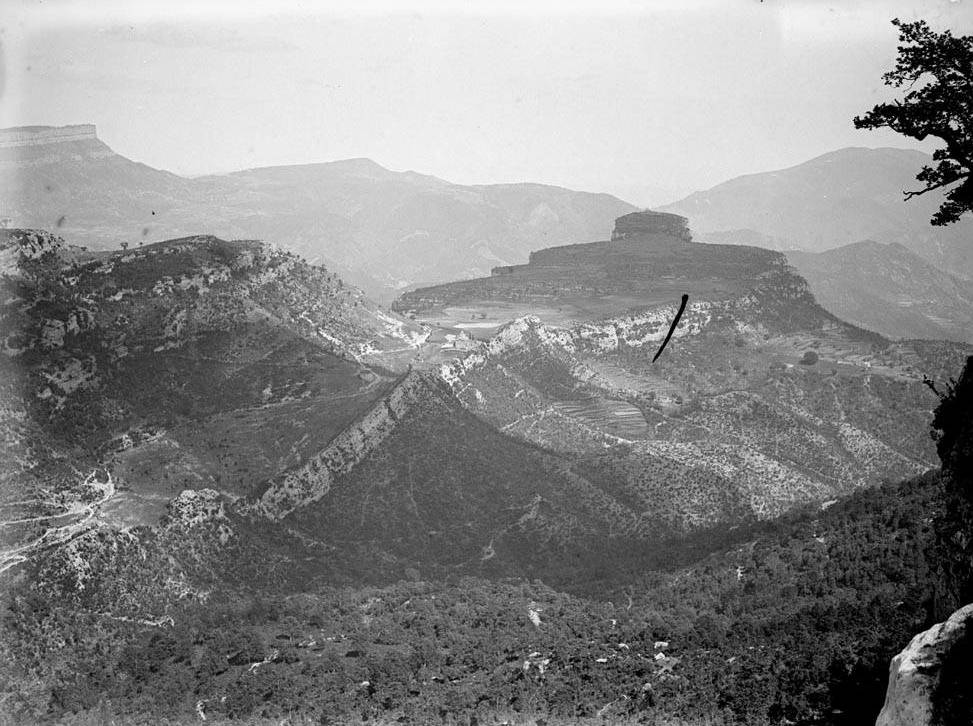
- L'Agullola among other mountain tops

Highest point
- Elevation: 921 m (3,022 ft)
- Listing: Mountains in Catalonia
- Coordinates: 42°0′16.2″N 2°28′58.63″E

Geography
- Location: Osona, Catalonia
- Parent range: Guilleries

Climbing
- Easiest route: From Rupit i Pruit

L'Agullola is a mountain of the Guilleries Massif, Catalonia, Spain. It has an elevation of 921.9 metres above sea level. The plateau known as Pla de Fàbregues lies NW of the summit. L'Agullola Grossa is a sharp rocky outcrop rising just SE of the cliff wall.
