= Caldes de Malavella =

- Municipality
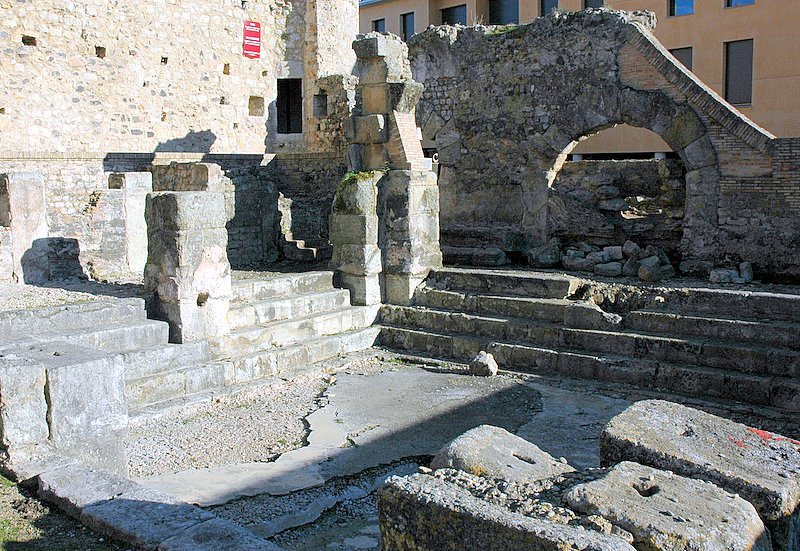
- Ancient Roman bath in the municipality

- Flag Coat of arms

- Location in Catalonia
- Coordinates: 41°50′22″N 2°48′38″E
- Country: Spain
- Community: Catalonia
- Province: Girona
- Comarca: Selva

Government
  - Mayor: Sergi Mir (2025)

Area
  - Total: 57.3 km^{2} (22.1 sq mi)
- Elevation: 84 m (276 ft)

Population (2025-01-01)
  - Total: 8,673
  - Density: 151/km^{2} (392/sq mi)
- Postal code: 17455
- Website: www.caldesdemalavella.cat

Caldes de Malavella (Catalan pronunciation: [ˈkaldəz ðə mələˈβeʎə]) is a municipality of the comarca of Selva in Catalonia, Spain. In 2014, its population was 7,130.

The place was formerly very famous for its thermal baths.

== Transport ==
Public transport is generally accessible within Caldes de Malavella. It is also well- connected to other cities in Spain through the rail system.

=== Rail ===
Caldes de Malavella is served at the Caldes de Malavella railway station to the West of the urban centre. It is connected via the Barcelona Sants to Portbou railway line run by the Renfe railway network. The journey time to Girona and Barcelona is approximately 20 minutes and 1 hour and 30 minutes respectively. The frequency of the train ranges from 10 minutes to an hour.

=== Bus ===
It is also possible to travel from Girona to Caldes de Malavella via bus. The journey time from Girona is approximately an hour.

=== Airport ===
The nearest airport to Caldes de Malavella is Girona-Costa Brava Airport. There is no direct bus from the airport to Caldes de Malavella. One may either drive (taxi or car rental) directly from the airport by taking the NII / A2 direction towards Barcelona or first take a bus to Girona city centre before taking another bus or train from the city centre to Caldes de Malavella.

=== Sport ===
Camiral Golf Course is located here and has been confirmed as the host venue for the 2031 Ryder Cup. It will be the second time that Spain has staged the biennial competition, after Valderrama hosted in 1997.

== Notable people ==
- Iván Balliu, footballer
