= Massanes, Catalonia =

Massanes
- Municipality
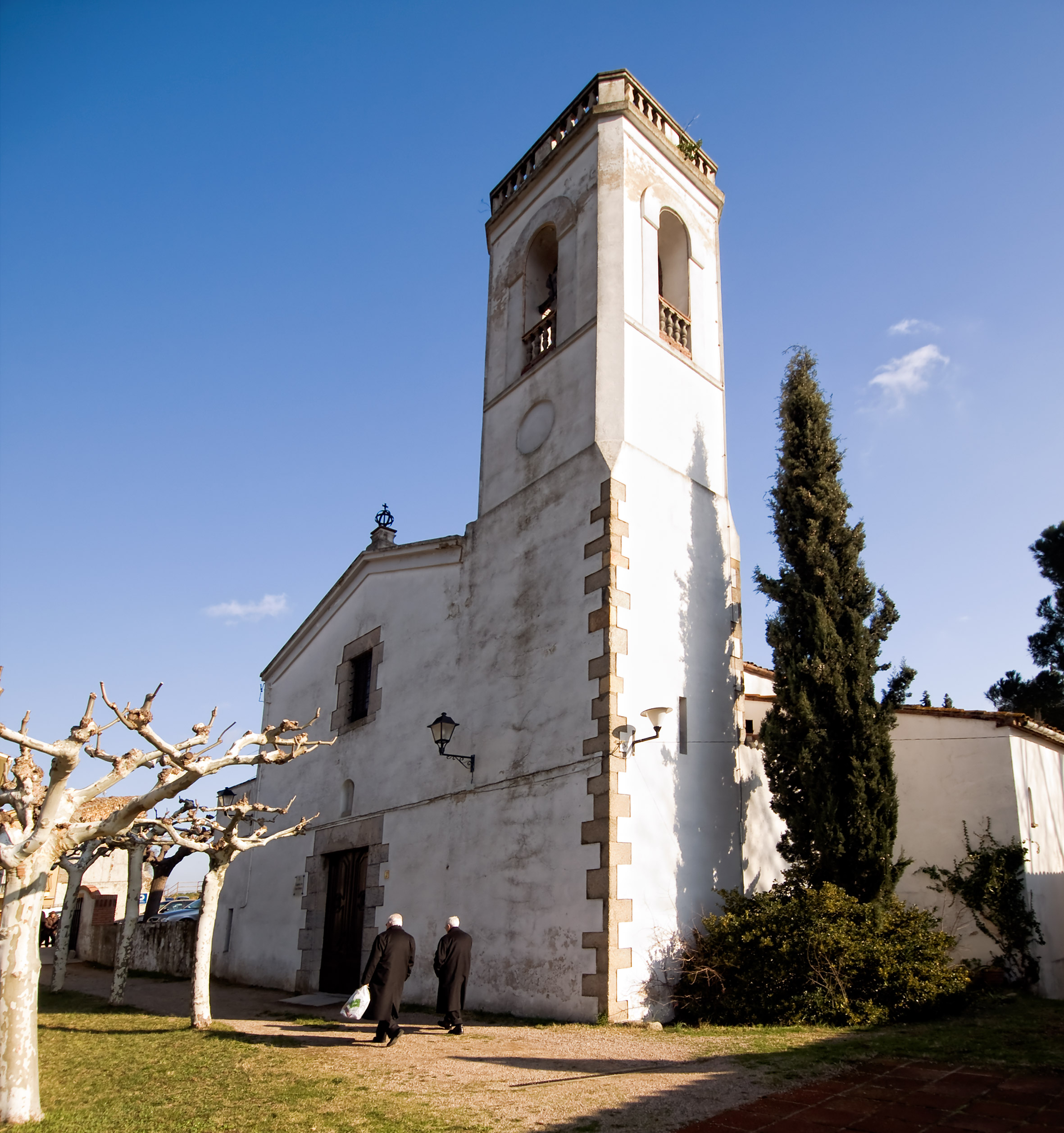
- St. Stephen's church, Massanes

- Coat of arms

- Location in Catalonia Massanes (Spain)
- Coordinates: 41.767778°N 2.6525°E
- Country: Spain
- Community: Catalonia
- Province: Girona
- Comarca: Selva

Government
  - Mayor: Joan Pou Lucea (2015)

Area
  - Total: 26.1 km^{2} (10.1 sq mi)
- Elevation: 164 m (538 ft)

Population (2025-01-01)
  - Total: 882
  - Density: 33.8/km^{2} (87.5/sq mi)
- Demonym(s): Massanenc, massanenca
- Website: www.massanes.cat

Massanes (Catalan pronunciation: [məˈsanəs]), also called Maçanes ("apple grove", lit. 'apples'), is a municipality of the province of Girona, in the comarca of the Selva in Catalonia, Spain. It is situated on the left bank of the Tordera river. Local roads link the town with the A-7 autopista, the C-251 road and the Renfe railway station shared with Maçanet de la Selva.

== Demography ==
1900	1930	1950	1970	1986	2007
725	728	698	603	466	693
