= Sant Julià del Llor i Bonmatí =

- Municipality
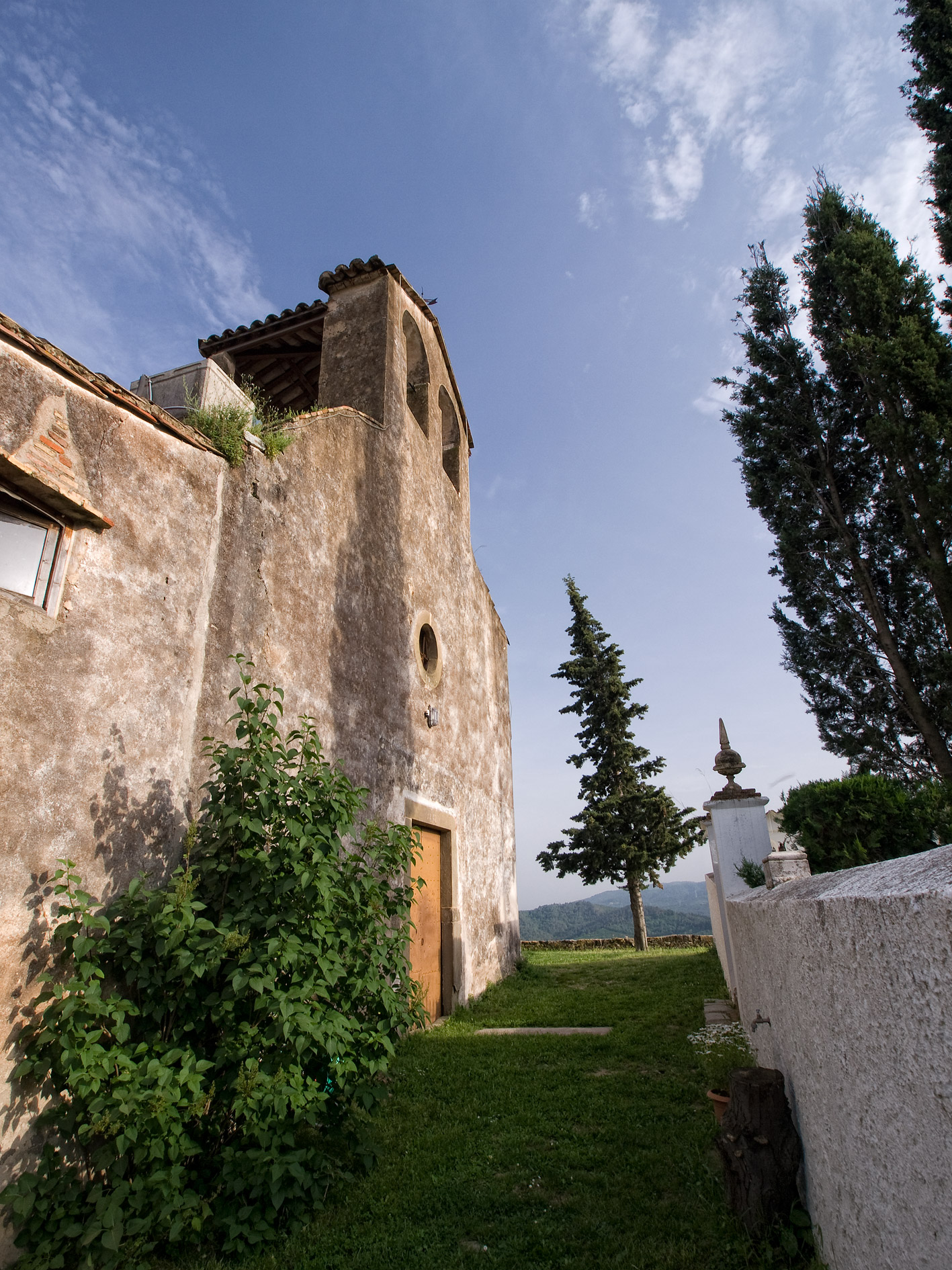
- Sant Julià parish church

- Flag Coat of arms

- Location in Catalonia
- Coordinates: 41.970°N 2.665°E
- Country: Spain
- Community: Catalonia
- Province: Girona
- Comarca: Selva

Government
  - mayor: Marc Garcia Nadal (2015)

Area
  - Total: 9.7 km^{2} (3.7 sq mi)
- Elevation: 117 m (384 ft)

Population (2025-01-01)
  - Total: 1,457
  - Density: 150/km^{2} (390/sq mi)
- Postal code: 17903
- Website: www.stjuliabonmati.com

Sant Julià del Llor i Bonmatí (Catalan pronunciation: [ˈsaɲ ʒuliˈa ðəʎ ˈʎɔɾ i βɔmməˈti]) is a municipality in the comarca of la Selva in Catalonia, Spain.

== Villages ==
- Bonmatí, 898
- Sant Julià del Llor, 109
