= Vidreres =

- Municipality
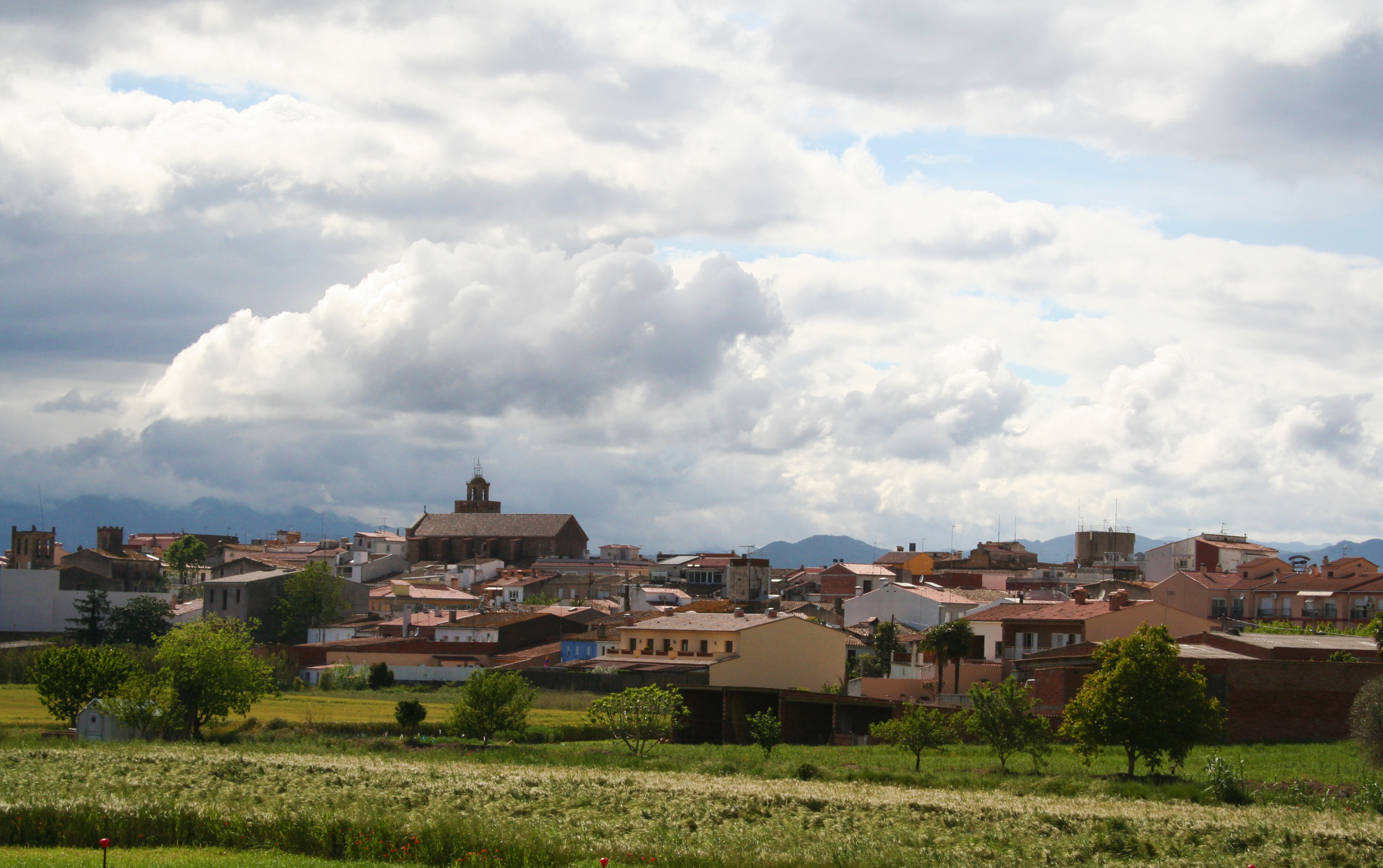
- Vidreres

- Flag Coat of arms

- Location in Catalonia Vidreres (Spain)
- Coordinates: 41°47′25″N 2°46′30″E
- Country: Spain
- Community: Catalonia
- Province: Girona
- Comarca: Selva

Government
  - Mayor: Jordi Camps Vicente (2015)

Area
  - Total: 48.0 km^{2} (18.5 sq mi)

Population (2025-01-01)
  - Total: 8,862
  - Density: 185/km^{2} (478/sq mi)
- Website: vidreres.cat

Vidreres (Catalan pronunciation: [biˈðɾeɾəs]) is a municipality in the comarca of La Selva, the province of Girona and autonomous community of Catalonia, Spain.
