= Rupit =

Village in Catalonia, Spain

Coordinates: 42.024814°N 2.464964°E

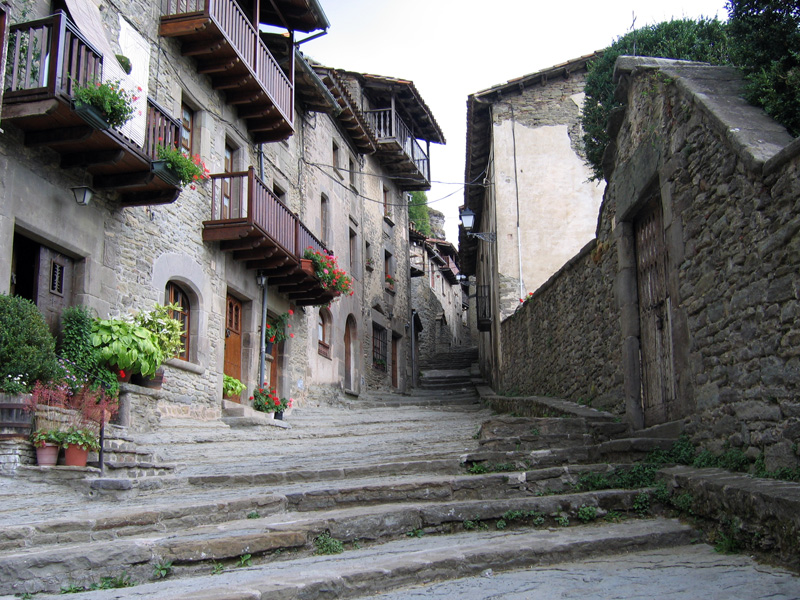
A street in Rupit.

Rupit (officially part of Rupit i Pruit municipality) is a village in the county of Osona, in the subregion of the Collsacabra, in Catalonia, Spain. It is located at 822 m above sea level, 98 km from Barcelona.

== History ==
The church of Sant Joan de Fàbregues and its castle are documented from the year 968. The church, which was the main church of the municipality, is located about 3 km from the castle. In the 12th century, the town grew around the castle of Rupit. Noble families built a new church, Sant Miquel, where they had built their houses. This church now is the parish church.

In 1959 the municipality was officially named Rupit. In 1977, the hamlet of Pruit was united with Rupit village. And now it's officially called Rupit i Pruit.

In origin both the hamlet of Pruit and the village of Rupit already shared the same jurisdiction under the viscount of Osona. According to the tradition, he lived in the castle of Rupit before moving to Cardona.

Nowadays Rupit is best known as a tourist town, because of its medieval appearance, stone houses and streets made of natural rock. There are also interesting walks and sightseeing around the village and nearby cliffs.

The "Riera de Rupit" is a small river running through Rupit and forms the Sallent waterfall when it meets the cliffs. There is a hanging bridge which provides access the center of the village.

== Geography ==
Rupit is situated at about 868m. of altitude next to the "Riera de Rupit" (Rupit river) on a part of a small rocky hill . The old part of the village sits on a kind of narrow ridge above the river and some streets climb up the hill, reaching the very top of the hill, there are also some new houses built near the river and in a very close small valley behind the ridge. About 1 km in a straight line from the village there are cliffs and below them there is a huge valley at the bottom of which there are 2 big dams, the Pantà de Sau and the Pantà de Susqueda, where the Rupit river flows into after it falls down the "Sallent" waterfall. The rest of the municipality is mainly small flat fields surrounded by hills and small mountains. There are other small streams and ponds.

== Flora and fauna ==
There are birds like the eagle and the Egyptian vulture living near the cliffs.

== Places of interest ==
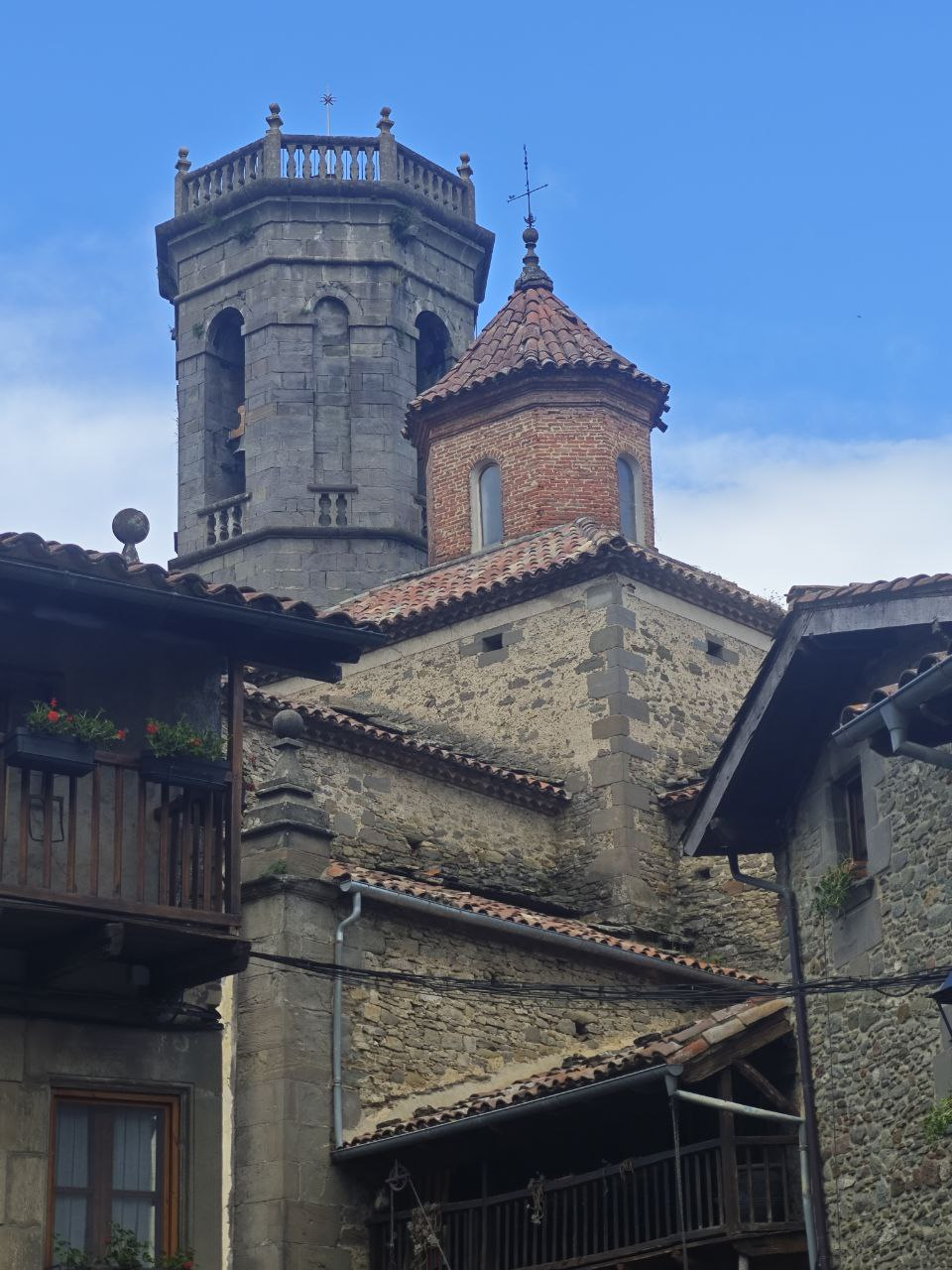
City of Rupit

- Old part of Rupit with its narrow medieval streets with old houses and stone streets.
- Romanesque Church of Sant Joan de Fàbregues
- Church of Sant Llorenç Dosmunts.(about 5 km. from Rupit on the way to Vic on the C-153)
- Church of Sant Andreu de Pruit. (about 3 km. from Rupit)
- Church of Sant Miquel de Rupit
- Sanctuary of El Far (near Rupit, in the municipality of Susqueda, on the way to Olot on the C-153 road)
- Sallent waterfall
- Hanging bridge

== Climate ==
Rupit has a Mediterranean mountain climate with warm to hot summers and cold winters, much colder than on the coast, due to its altitude and distance from the sea. Most rainfall occurs in the spring and autumn but sudden downpours can occur in summer as well. These storms tend to affect mountain areas and are difficult to predict. Snow typically falls between November and April, but doesn't stay for long normally. Frost is common on most clear nights from October to late April.
