= Susqueda Reservoir =

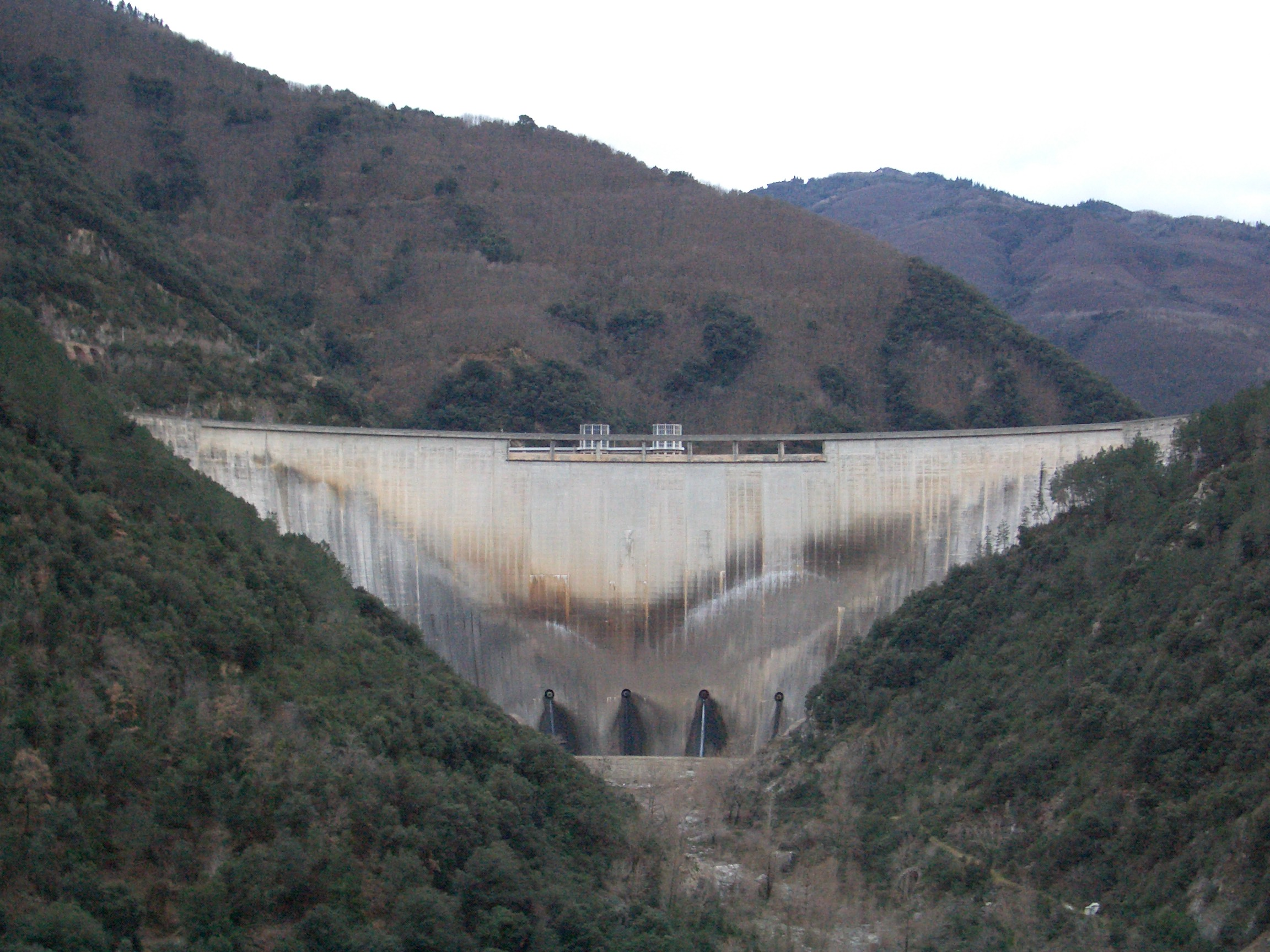
- The dam in 2007

- Location of Pantà de Susqueda
- Official name: Pantà de Susqueda
- Country: Spain
- Location: Osor, Susqueda and Sant Hilari Sacalm, Catalonia
- Coordinates: 41°58′45″N 2°31′38″E
- Status: Operational
- Opening date: 1968

Dam and spillways
- Impounds: Ter
- Height: 135 m (443 ft)
- Length: 360 m (1,180 ft)

Reservoir
- Total capacity: 230 hm³
- Catchment area: 1775 km²
- Surface area: 466 ha

Susqueda Reservoir (Catalan: Pantà de Susqueda; Spanish: Embalse de Susqueda) is a reservoir located on the Ter River, near Osor, Catalonia, Spain. The dam is located in Osor, while the main water body lies within the municipal boundaries of Susqueda and Sant Hilari Sacalm. Completed in 1968, the dam created a reservoir with a storage capacity of 233 hm³, submerging the former villages of Susqueda and Querós. The dam has a structural height of 135 metres and a crest length of 360 metres.

== See also ==
- List of dams and reservoirs in Catalonia
