= Fogars de la Selva =

- Municipality
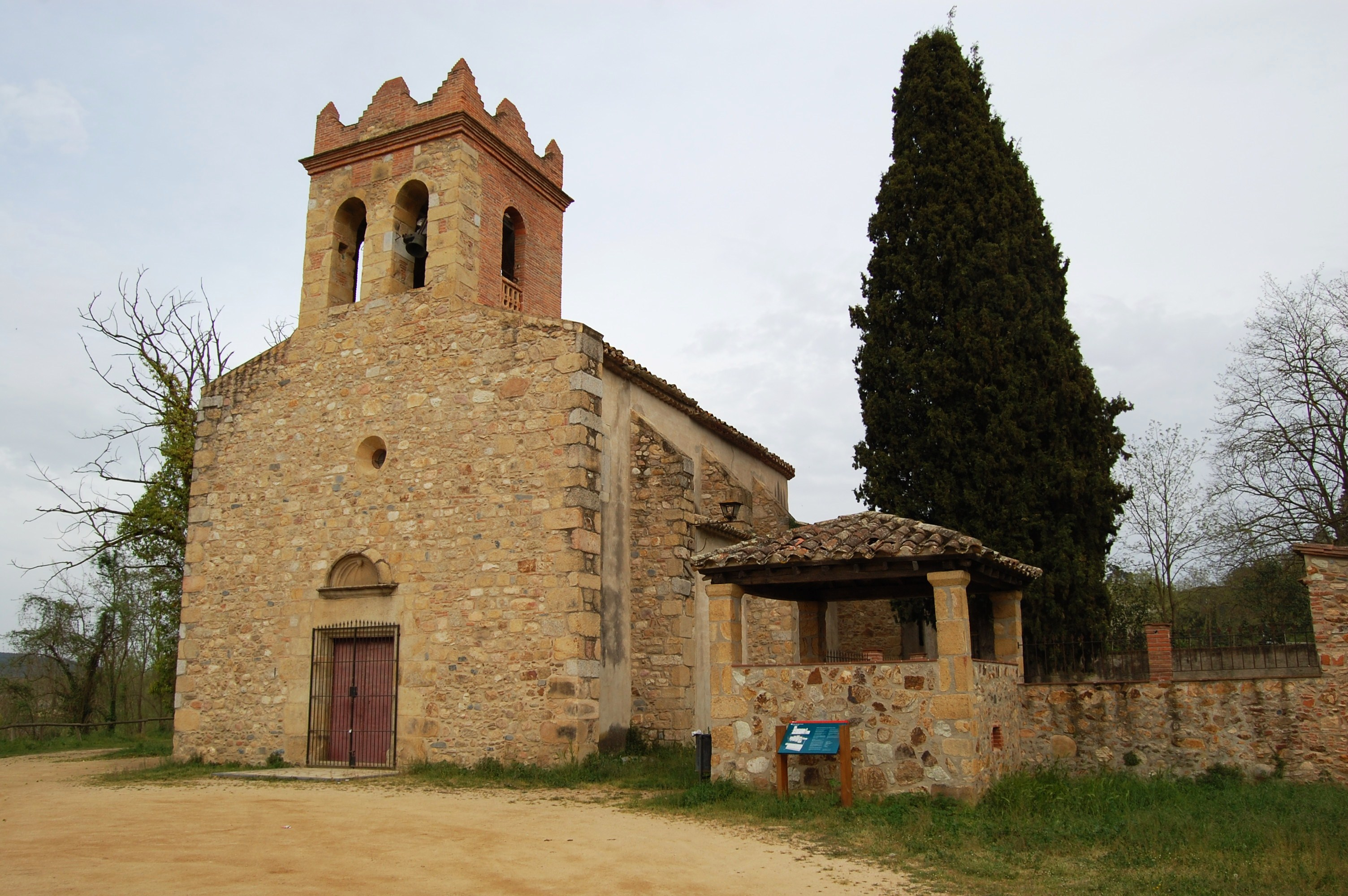
- Sant Cebrià church, Fogars de la Selva

- Location in the Province of Barcelona Location in Catalonia Location in Spain
- Coordinates: 41°44′2.4″N 2°40′22.8″E
- Country: Spain
- Community: Catalonia
- Province: Barcelona
- Comarca: Selva

Government
  - Mayor: Josep Vilà Camps (2015)

Area
  - Total: 32.1 km^{2} (12.4 sq mi)
- Elevation: 45 m (148 ft)

Population (2025-01-01)
  - Total: 1,704
  - Density: 53.1/km^{2} (137/sq mi)
- Demonym(s): Fogarencs, fogarenques
- Website: fogarsdelaselva.cat

Fogars de la Selva (Catalan pronunciation: [fuˈɣaz ðə lə ˈsɛlβə]) is a municipality in the comarca of the Selva in Catalonia, Spain. It is situated to the north of the Montnegre range, and is linked to Tordera by a local road. The village used to be called Fogars de Tordera, and is the only municipality in the Selva to be part of the province of Barcelona rather than the province of Girona.

== Demography ==
1900	1930	1950	1970	1986	2007
485	443	443	244	293	1437
