= Tavertet =

- Municipality
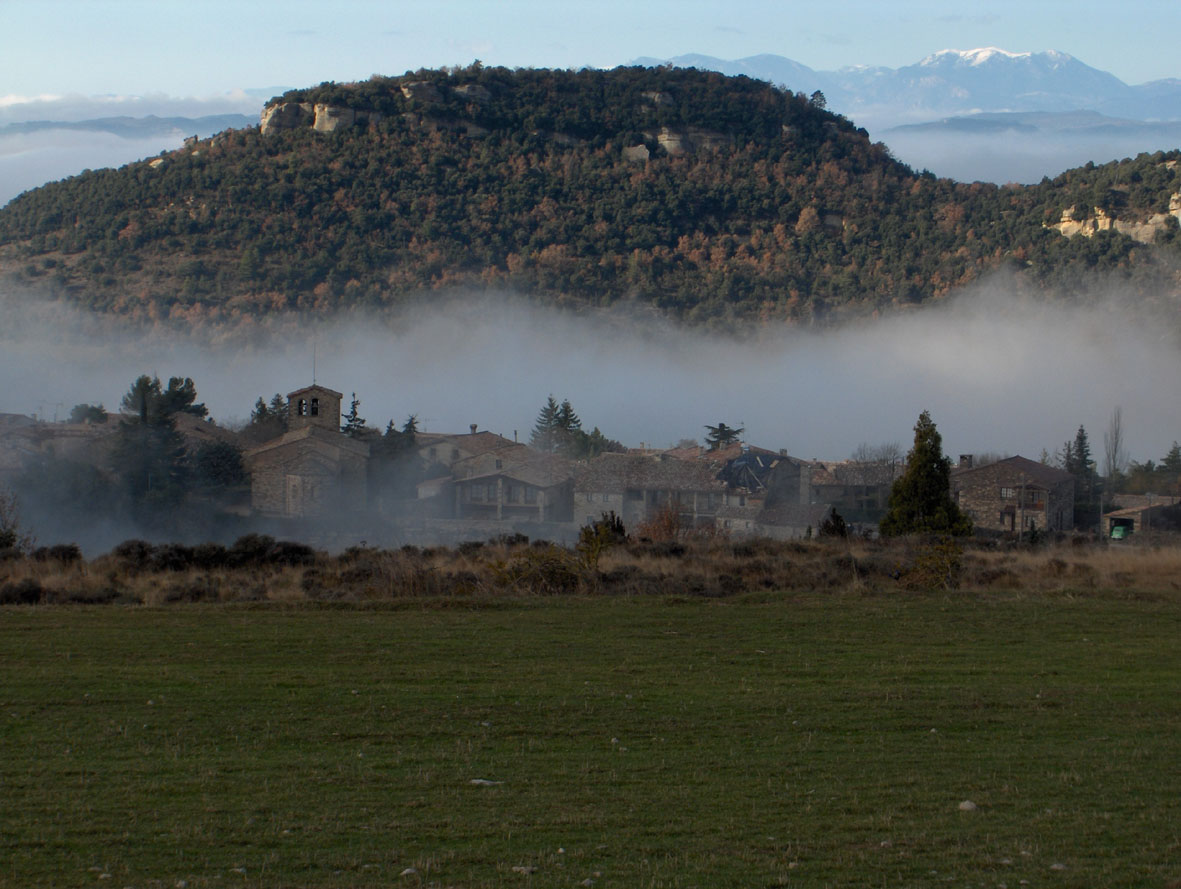
- Tavertet with the Puig de les Baumes rising over the town and the Pre-Pyrenees in the far distance

- Coat of arms

- Location in Catalonia
- Coordinates: 41°59′51″N 2°25′11″E
- Country: Spain
- Community: Catalonia
- Province: Barcelona
- Comarca: Osona

Government
  - Mayor: Lurdes Rovira Plarromaní (2015)

Area
  - Total: 32.5 km^{2} (12.5 sq mi)
- Elevation: 869 m (2,851 ft)

Population (2025-01-01)
  - Total: 128
  - Density: 3.94/km^{2} (10.2/sq mi)
- Postal code: 08280
- Website: tavertet.cat

Tavertet (Catalan pronunciation: [təβəɾˈtɛt]) is a small town located above some cliffs, 900m above sea level, in the area known as Collsacabra, north of the Guilleries, in the comarca of Osona in Catalonia.

Below the cliffs is Pantà de Sau, a reservoir that dammed the waters of the river Ter in the 1960s. Tavertet is nowadays a tourist-oriented town with many holiday homes, where Raimon Panikkar lived. Tavertet is linked by road BV5207 to the town of L'Esquirol, also known as Santa Maria de Corcó. There is also a minor road north of the village above the cliffs through a beech forest linking the town to Rupit.

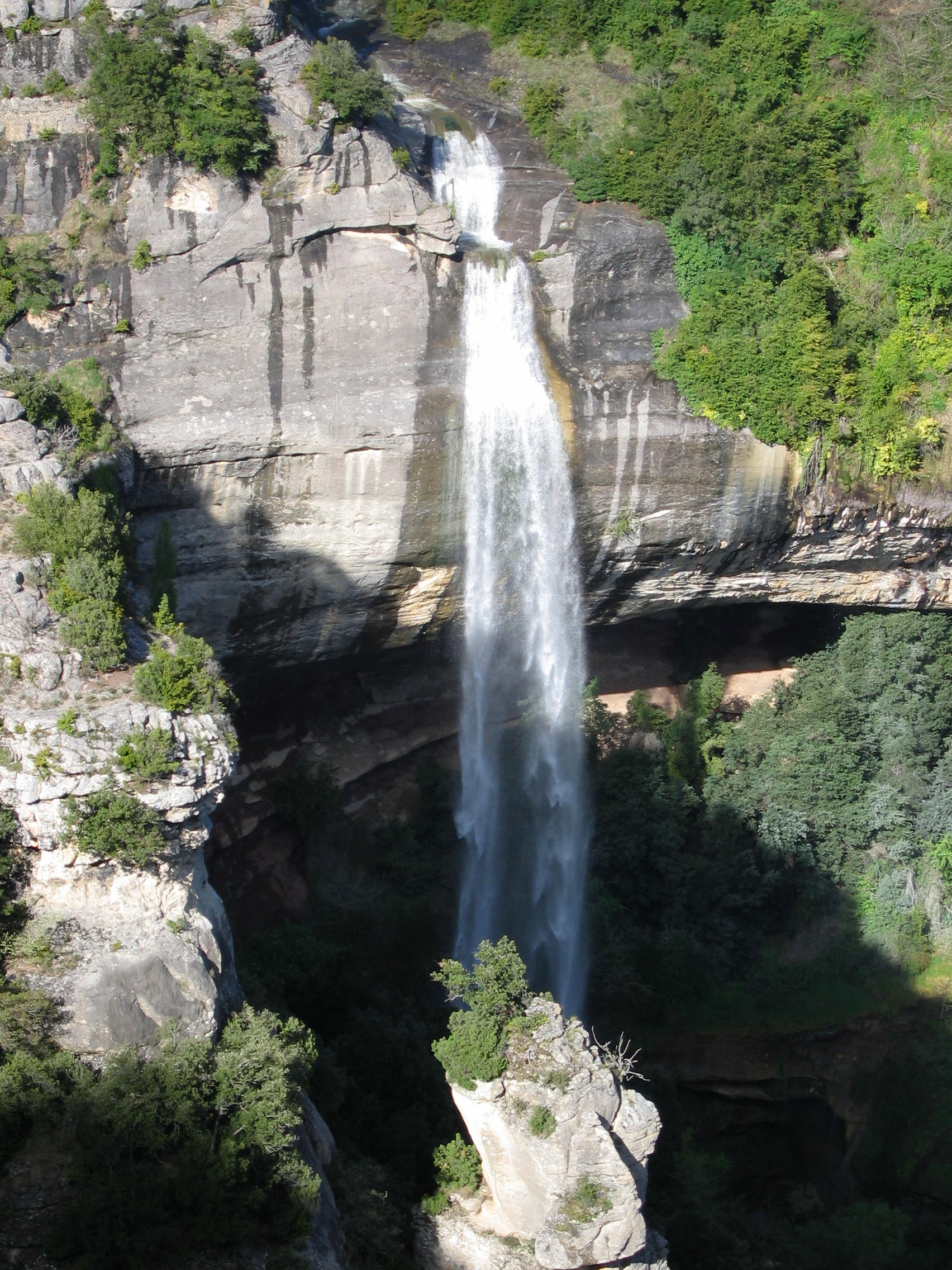
Molí-bernat waterfall near Tavertet
