= Anglès, Spain =

Anglès
- Municipality
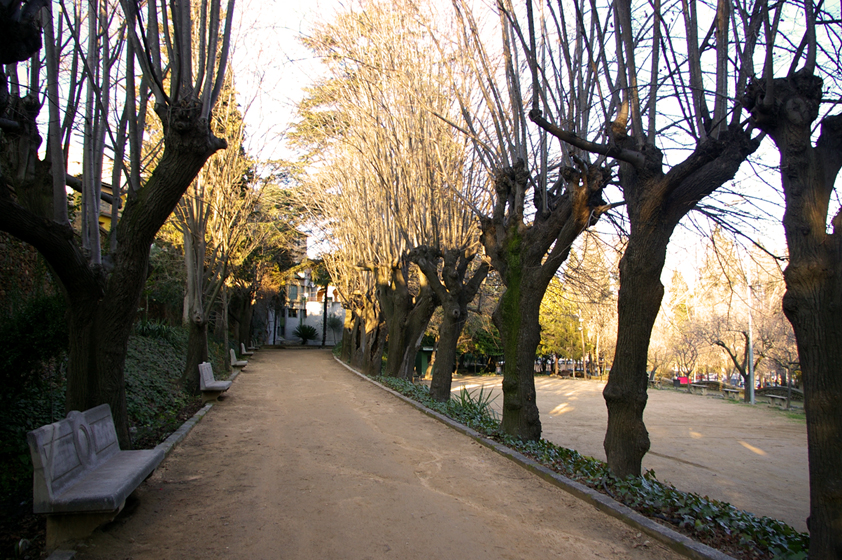
- Can Cendra gardens, in Anglès

- Coat of arms

- Location in Catalonia Anglès (Spain)
- Coordinates: 41°57′N 2°39′E
- Country: Spain
- Autonomous Community: Catalonia
- Province: Girona
- Comarca: Selva

Government
  - Mayor: Astrid Victoria Desset (2015)

Area
  - Total: 16.3 km^{2} (6.3 sq mi)
- Elevation (AMSL): 12 m (39 ft)

Population (2025-01-01)
  - Total: 5,944
  - Density: 365/km^{2} (944/sq mi)
- Postal code: 08001–17160
- Area code: +34 (Spain) + 972 (Girona)
- Administrative Divisions: 6
- Website: www.angles.cat

Anglès (Catalan pronunciation: [əŋˈɡlɛs]) is a Catalan municipality, in the comarca of Selva, in the province of Girona, Catalonia. It has an area of 16.30 km² and a population of 5,446 people (2008).

== History ==
In May 1956, the Society of Sport Fishermen of Anglès and Comarca SPEDAC (current SPEAC) was created, this being one of the most active associations in the town; Joaquim Bauxell i Costa together with the American composer, musician and pianist Pere Buxó i Domènech created the sardana with lyrics "Anant a la Pesca", which is the Anthem of the Anglés Fishermen's Sports Society.

The fishing society organizes an annual competition during the Anglès Galas, which has attracted up to 200 anglers. It is worth highlighting the work they have done to maintain and conserve the ichthyofauna, repopulating the rivers and introducing new species, such as e.g. black bass, carp, trout and catfish.

== Notable people ==
- Remedios Varo Uranga, (Anglès, 1908 - Mexico City, 1963), Surrealist painter.

== Villages ==
- Anglès, 5.005
- Cuc, 23
- La Farga, 6
- Les Mines del Sant Pare, 24
- Pla d'Amont, 102
- Pla d'Avall, 51
