= Brunyola =

- Municipality
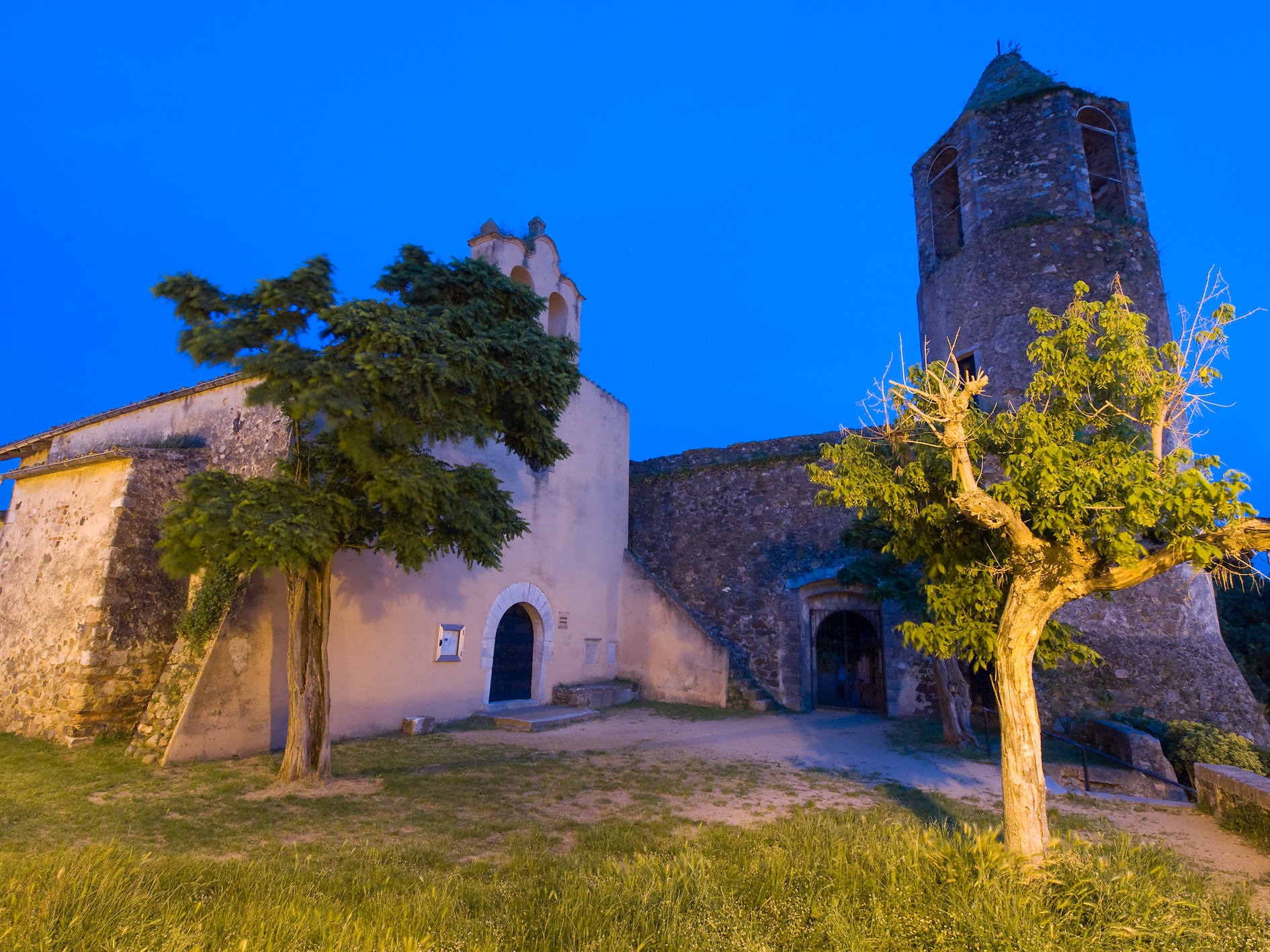
- Church

- Flag Coat of arms

- Location in Catalonia Brunyola (Spain)
- Coordinates: 41°54′23″N 2°41′8″E
- Country: Spain
- Community: Catalonia
- Province: Girona
- Comarca: Selva

Government
  - Mayor: Francesc Johe Carreras (2015)

Area
  - Total: 36.8 km^{2} (14.2 sq mi)

Population (2025-01-01)
  - Total: 401
  - Density: 10.9/km^{2} (28.2/sq mi)
- Website: www.brunyola.cat

Brunyola (Catalan pronunciation: [bɾuˈɲɔlə]) is a village in the province of Girona and autonomous community of Catalonia, Spain. The municipality covers an area of 36.74 square kilometres (14.19 sq mi) and the population in 2014 was 391.
