= Raimon Panikkar =

Spanish-Indian Catholic priest and theologian (1918–2010)

The Reverend Raimon Panikkar
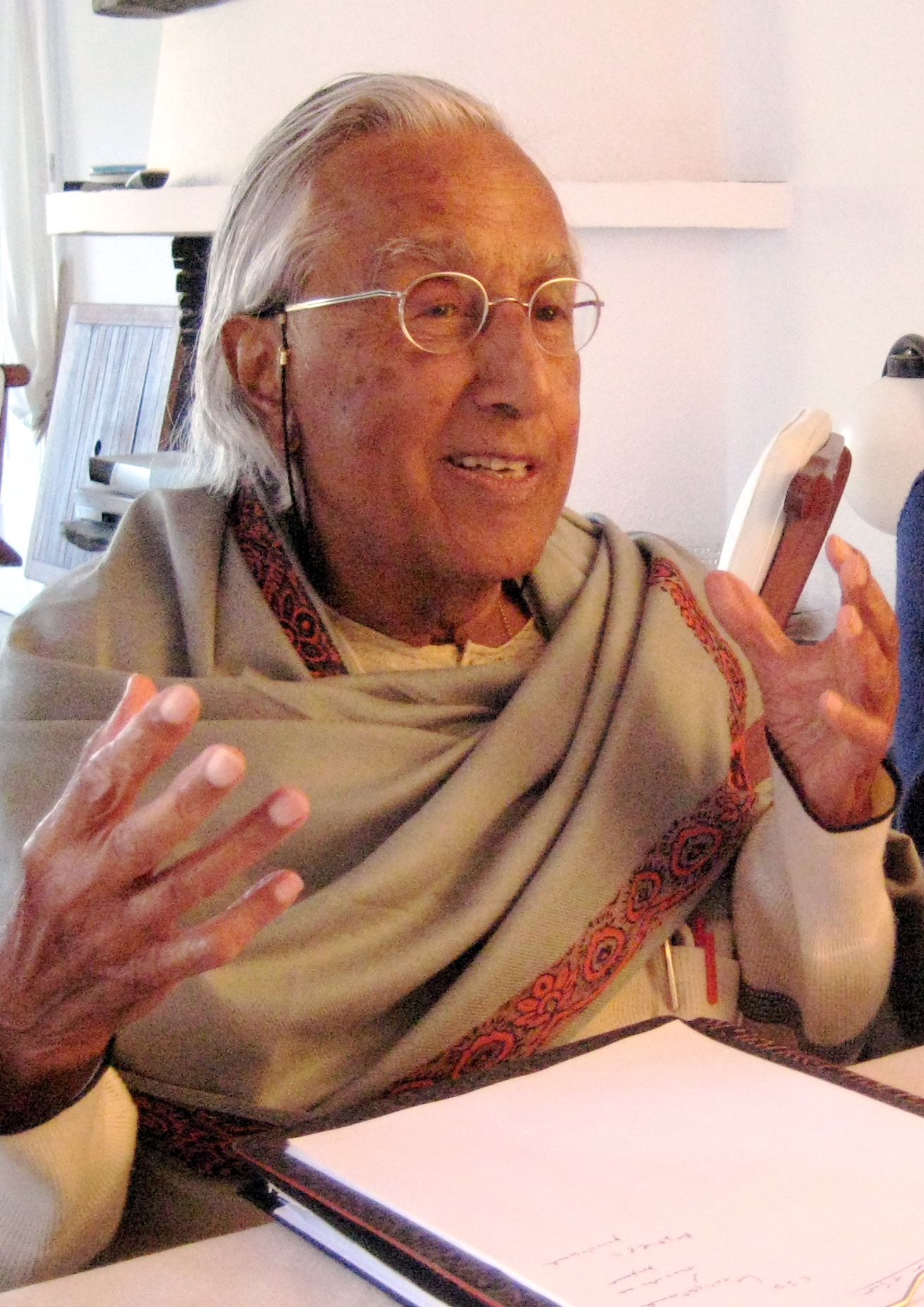
- Panikkar in 2007
- Born: Raimon Pannikar Alemany; November 2, 1918; Barcelona, Catalonia, Spain
- Died: August 26, 2010 (aged 91); Tavertet, Catalonia, Spain
- Occupations: Roman Catholic priest, theologian, scholar, chemist, philosopher

Raimon Panikkar Alemany, also known as Raimundo Panikkar and Raymond Panikkar (November 2, 1918 – August 26, 2010), was a Spanish Catholic priest and a proponent of interfaith dialogue. As a scholar, he specialized in comparative religion.

== Early life and education ==
Raimon Panikkar was born to a Spanish Catholic mother and a Malayali Hindu Indian father in Barcelona. His mother was well-educated and from the Catalan bourgeoisie. His father, Ramunni Panikkar, belonged to a Nair family from Malabar, South India. Panikkar's father was a freedom fighter during British colonial rule in India, who later escaped from Britain and married into a Catalan family. Panikkar's father studied in England and was the representative of a German chemical company in Barcelona.

Educated at a Jesuit school, Panikkar studied chemistry and philosophy at the universities of Barcelona, Bonn and Madrid, and Catholic theology in Madrid and Rome. He earned a doctorate in philosophy at the University of Madrid in 1946 and a doctorate in chemistry in 1958. He earned a third doctorate in theology at the Pontifical Lateran University in Rome in 1961, in which he compared Thomas Aquinas's philosophy with the 8th-century Hindu philosopher Ādi Śańkara's interpretation of the Brahma Sutras.

== Career ==
In 1946 he was ordained a Catholic priest and became a professor of philosophy at the University of Madrid. He made his first trip to India in 1954 where he studied Indian philosophy and religion at the University of Mysore and Banaras Hindu University, where he met several Western monks seeking Eastern forms for the expression of their Christian beliefs. "I left Europe [for India] as a Christian, I discovered I was a Hindu and returned as a Buddhist without ever having ceased to be Christian", he later wrote.

While in Jerusalem during 1962, he was summoned to Rome by the Opus Dei founder and director, Josemaría Escrivá, who expelled him after a brief trial where he was charged with disobedience to the organization.

In 1966 he became a visiting professor at Harvard Divinity School and a professor of religious studies at the University of California, Santa Barbara in 1972, and for many years he taught in the spring and spent the rest of the year doing research in India. Where the typical approach to cross-cultural religious studies, especially in a secular university, was to hold two or more traditions at arm's length and draw lines of comparison between them, Panikkar's approach was to view issues in the real world through the eyes of two or more traditions.

In 1987 he moved to Tavertet in Catalonia, in the hills north of Barcelona, where he founded the Raimon Panikkar Vivarium Foundation, a center for intercultural studies. In 2005 he created Arbor, for the realization of his principle of interreligious collaboration for the relief of poverty in thousands of villages of India.

Panikkar authored more than 40 books and 900 articles. His complete works are being published in Italian. His 1989 Gifford Lectures were published in English by Orbis in 2009 under the title The Rhythm of Being.

In a statement from his residence in Tavertet dated January 26, 2010, he wrote:

"Dear Friends ... I would like to communicate with you that I believe the moment has come (put off time and again), to withdraw from all public activity, both the direct and the intellectual participation, to which I have dedicated all my life as a way of sharing my reflections. I will continue to be close to you in a deeper way, through silence and prayer, and in the same way I would ask you to be close to me in this last period of my existence. You have often heard me say that a person is a knot in a network of relationships; in taking my leave from you I would like to thank you from the bottom of my heart for having enriched me with the relationship I have had with each of you. I am also grateful to all of those who, either in person or through association, continue working to spread my message and the sharing of my ideals, even without me. Thankful for the gift of life which is only such if lived in communion with others: it is with this spirit that I have lived out my ministry."

== Works ==
- The Unknown Christ of Hinduism (1964)
- The "crisis" of Madhyamika and Indian philosophy today. University of Hawaii Press (1966)
- Cometas: Fragmentos de un diario espiritual de la postguerra. Euramerica, S.A. (first edition; 1972)
- Worship and secular man: An essay on the liturgical nature of man, considering secularization as a major phenomenon of our time and worship as an apparent fact of all times; A study towards an integral anthropology. Orbis Books, 1973
- The Trinity and the religious experience of man: Icon-person-mystery. Orbis Books, 1973 ISBN 0-88344-495-X
- The Vedic Experience: Mantramañjari: An Anthology Of The Vedas For Modern Man. Berkeley: University of California Press, 1977.
- Colligite fragmenta: For an integration of reality. Villanova University Press, 1978
- Myth, Faith and Hermeneutics: Cross Cultural Studies. Paulist Press, 1979. ISBN 0-8091-0232-3
- 'Aporias in the comparative philosophy of religion', in Man and World, vol 13, 1980, pp. 357–83.
- The Unknown Christ Of Hinduism: Towards An Ecumenical Christophany (1981 Maryknoll, N.Y.: Orbis Books.) ISBN 0-88344-523-9
- Blessed Simplicity: The Monk as a Universal Archetype. San Francisco, CA: HarperSanFrancisco, 1984. ISBN 0-8164-0531-X
- The Silence of God: The Answer of the Buddha. Orbis Books; revised edition (June 1989) ISBN 0-88344-446-1
- The Cosmotheandric Experience: Emerging Religious Consciousness edited by Scott Eastham. Orbis Books, June 1993. ISBN 0-88344-862-9
- A Dwelling Place for Wisdom. Westminster John Knox Press, November 1993 ISBN 0-664-25362-8
- Invisible Harmony: Essays on Contemplation and Responsibility edited by Harry James Cargas. Augsburg Fortress Publishers, June 1995 ISBN 0-8006-2609-5
- Pluralism and oppression: theology in world perspective (co-authored with Paul F. Knitter). College Theology Society. Lanham, Md.: University Press of America, 1991.
- Cultural Disarmament: The Way to Peace. Westminster John Knox Press; September 1, 1995 ISBN 0-664-25549-3
- The Intrareligious Dialogue. Paulist Press; revised edition, July 1999. ISBN 0-8091-3763-1
- Christophany: The Fullness Of Man. Orbis Books, November 30, 2004. ISBN 1-57075-564-7
- Foreword to The Cave of the Heart: The Life of Swami Abhishiktananda by Shirley Du Boulay. Orbis, 2005. ISBN 1-57075-610-4
- Espiritualidad Hindu: Sanatana Dharma. Kairos, 2006 ISBN 84-7245-577-7
- The Experience of God: Icons of the Mystery (trans. by Joseph Cunneen). Fortress Press, 2006. ISBN 0-8006-3825-5
- Initiation to the Vedas. Motilal Banarsidass, July 15, 2006 ISBN 81-208-2954-9
- Human Rights as A Western Concept (co-authored with Arvind Sharma). D.K. Printworld, 2007, New Delhi. ISBN 81-246-0429-0
- The Rhythm of Being. The Gifford Lectures. Orbis Books, June 20, 2009. ISBN 978-1-57075-855-3
