= Maçanet de la Selva =

- Municipality
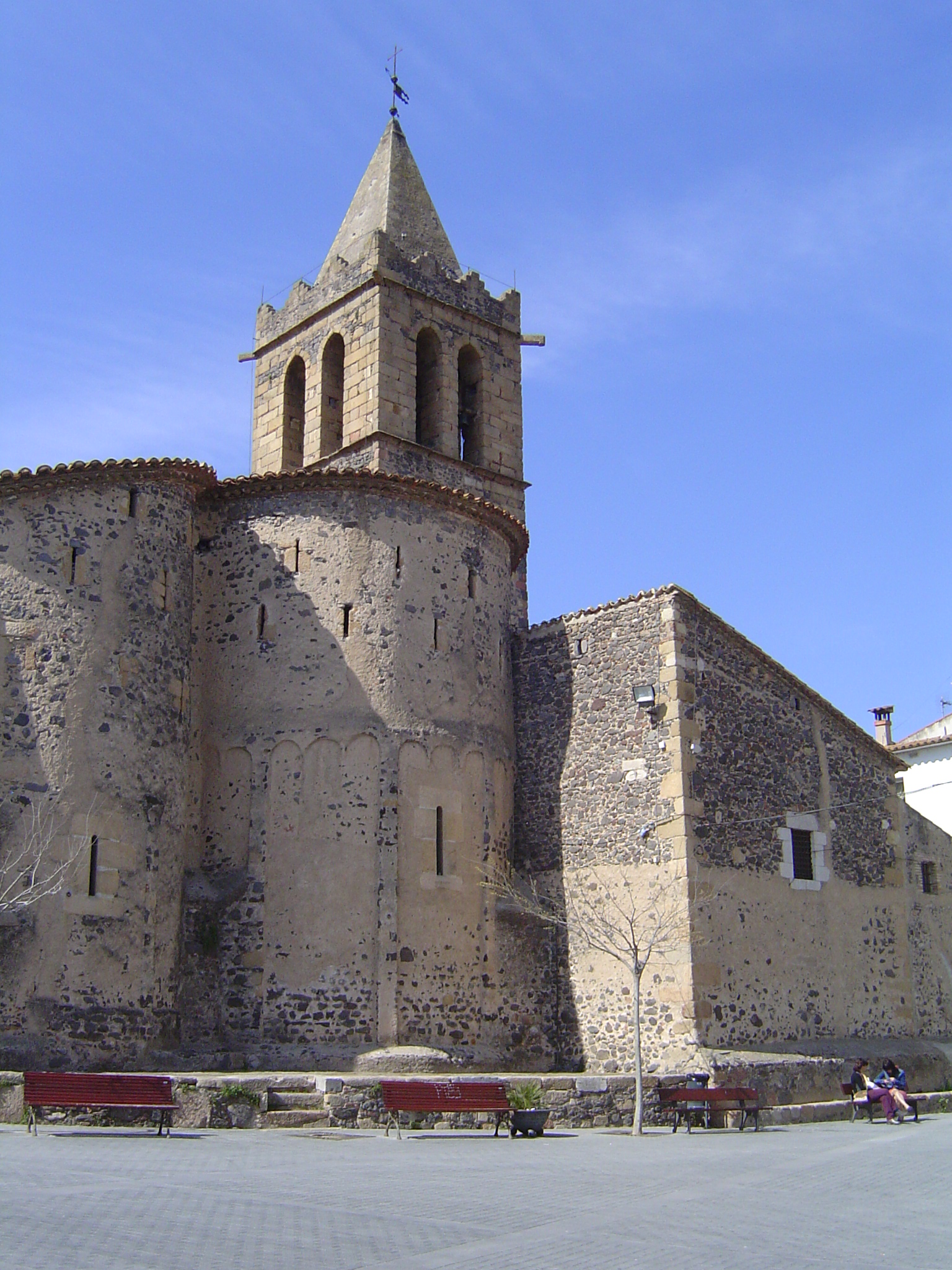

- Coat of arms

- Location within Province of Girona Location within Catalonia Location within Spain
- Coordinates: 41°46′46″N 2°44′0″E
- Country: Spain
- Community: Catalonia
- Province: Girona
- Comarca: Selva

Government
  - Mayor: Natàlia Figueras Pagès (2019)

Area
  - Total: 45.6 km^{2} (17.6 sq mi)
- Elevation: 94 m (308 ft)

Population (2025-01-01)
  - Total: 8,071
  - Density: 177/km^{2} (458/sq mi)
- Demonym: Maçanetenc
- Postal code: 17412
- Website: massanetdelaselva.org

Maçanet de la Selva (Catalan pronunciation: [məsəˈnɛd də lə ˈsɛlβə]) is a Spanish municipality in the province of Girona, situated in the comarca of the Selva, Catalonia. It is an important communications junction, where the routes from the coast meet those from the Prelittoral Depression to form a single axis north towards Girona and the French border. Renfe railway lines run both south-east (with the N-II road) towards Blanes and the coasts of the Maresme and south-west (with the A-7 autopista and the C-251 road) towards Granollers: the station is shared with the neighbouring municipality of Massanes.

== Main sights ==
- Romanesque church of Sant Llorenç
- Church of Sant Pere de Martorell
- Torcafelló Castle
- Montbarbat Iberian settlement
- Ton Konings
