= Riudarenes =

- Municipality
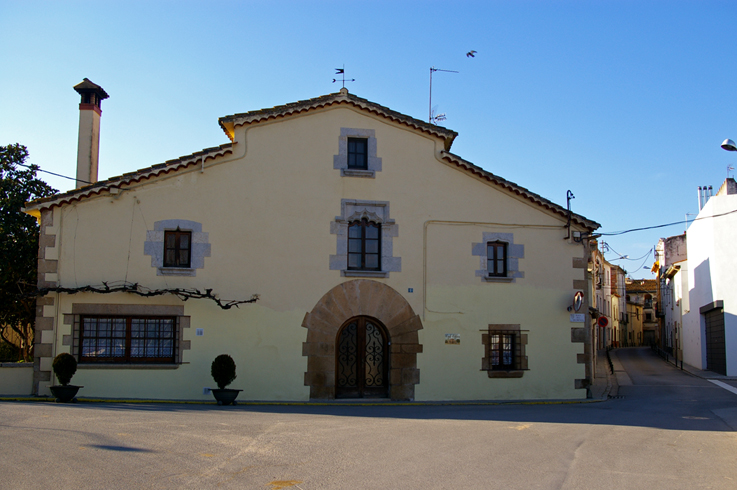
- Riudarenes

- Coat of arms

- Location in Catalonia Riudarenes (Spain)
- Coordinates: 41°49′14″N 2°43′2″E
- Country: Spain
- Community: Catalonia
- Province: Girona
- Comarca: Selva

Government
  - Mayor: Jordi Gironès Pasolas (2015)

Area
  - Total: 47.6 km^{2} (18.4 sq mi)

Population (2025-01-01)
  - Total: 2,532
  - Density: 53.2/km^{2} (138/sq mi)
- Website: www.ajuntamentderiudarenes.cat

Riudarenes (Catalan pronunciation: [riwðəˈɾɛnəs]) is a village in the province of Girona and autonomous community of Catalonia, Spain. The municipality covers an area of 47.6 square kilometres (18.4 sq mi) and the population in 2014 was 2,148.

== History ==
During the revolt of Catalonia in 1640, Spanish troops, led by Lleonard Moles came to the coast, burning and looting both the church and town hall of Riudarenes, where the town supposedly kept its jewels and wealth (a fire which also spread to the parish church of Sant Sadurní Montiró).

This act drew widespread condemnation from both the Consell de Cent of Barcelona in Catalonia and the court of the King of Spain and even in Rome. The bishop Gregori Parcero led the investigation in which witnesses testified to the fact that it was the soldiers of Lleonard Moles who were responsible. This led to the excommunication of both Moles and Juan de Arce.

So significant was this act of sacrilege that it was a big motivation to the Catalan insurgents against Philip IV.

Riudarenes is also the birthplace of football player Gerard Deulofeu.
