= Riells i Viabrea =

- Municipality
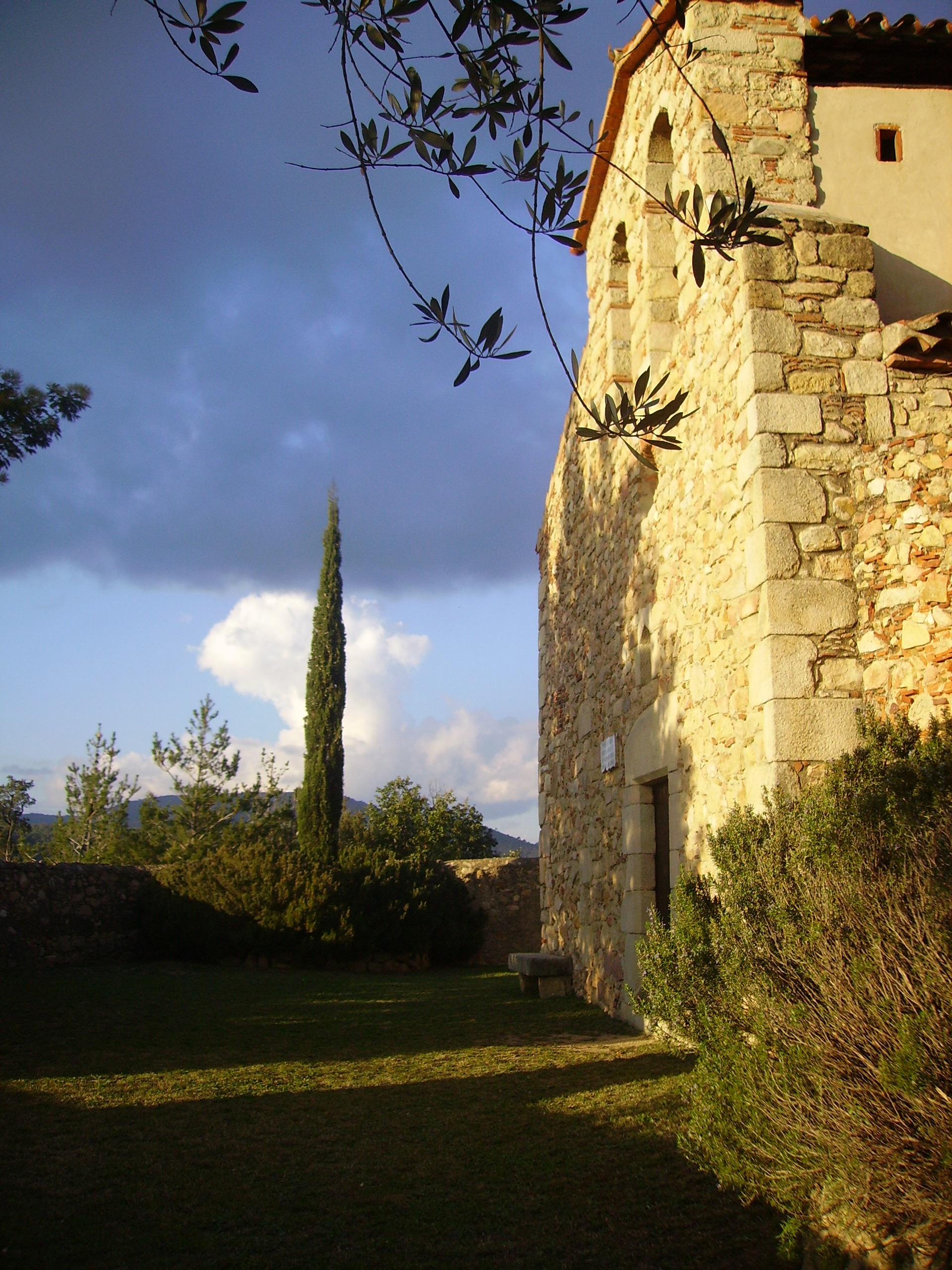
- Ermita de Sant Llop

- Flag Coat of arms

- Location in Catalonia Riells i Viabrea (Spain)
- Coordinates: 41.776°N 2.513°E
- Country: Spain
- Community: Catalonia
- Province: Girona
- Comarca: Selva

Government
  - Mayor: Josep Maria Bagot Belfort (2015)

Area
  - Total: 27.0 km^{2} (10.4 sq mi)

Population (2025-01-01)
  - Total: 4,635
  - Density: 172/km^{2} (445/sq mi)
- Website: www.riellsiviabrea.cat

Riells i Viabrea (Catalan pronunciation: [riˈeʎz i βiəˈβɾeə]) is a municipality in the province of Girona and autonomous community of Catalonia, Spain. The municipality covers an area of 27 square kilometres (10 sq mi) and the population in 2014 was 4,000.
