= Sant Feliu de Buixalleu =

- Municipality
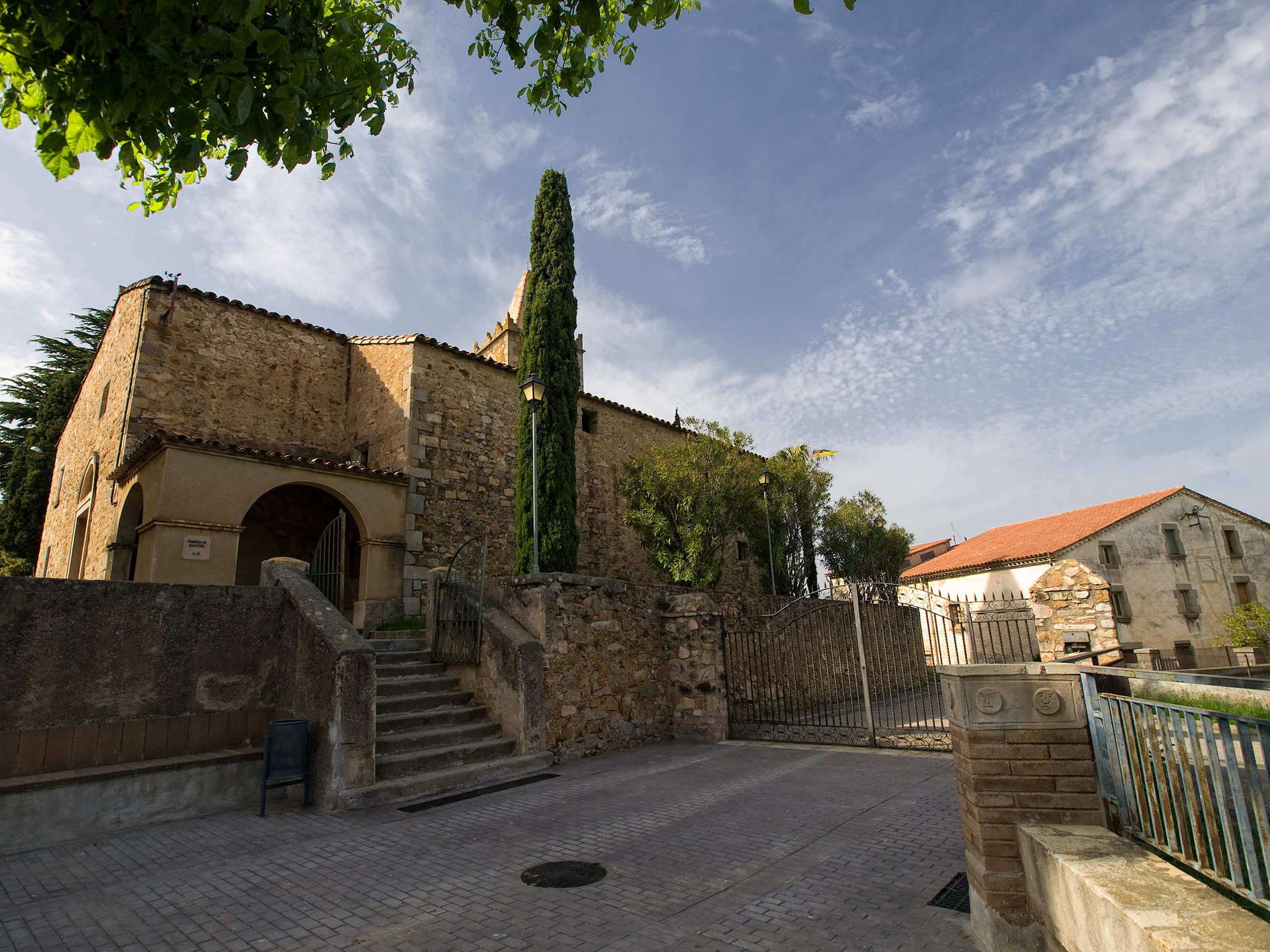
- Parish church of Sant Feliu

- Flag Coat of arms

- Location in Catalonia Sant Feliu de Buixalleu (Spain)
- Coordinates: 41°47′35″N 2°35′15″E
- Country: Spain
- Community: Catalonia
- Province: Girona
- Comarca: Selva

Government
  - Mayor: Josep Roquet Avellaneda (2015)

Area
  - Total: 61.9 km^{2} (23.9 sq mi)

Population (2025-01-01)
  - Total: 882
  - Density: 14.2/km^{2} (36.9/sq mi)
- Website: www.sfbuixalleu.cat

Sant Feliu de Buixalleu (Catalan pronunciation: [ˈsaɱ fəˈliw ðə βuʃəˈʎew]) is a village in the province of Girona and autonomous community of Catalonia, Spain. The village is situated in the southeast of the ancient Catalan comarca of Selva. The municipality covers an area of 61.94 square kilometres (23.92 sq mi) and the population in 2014 was 776.
