= Rupit i Pruit =

- Municipality
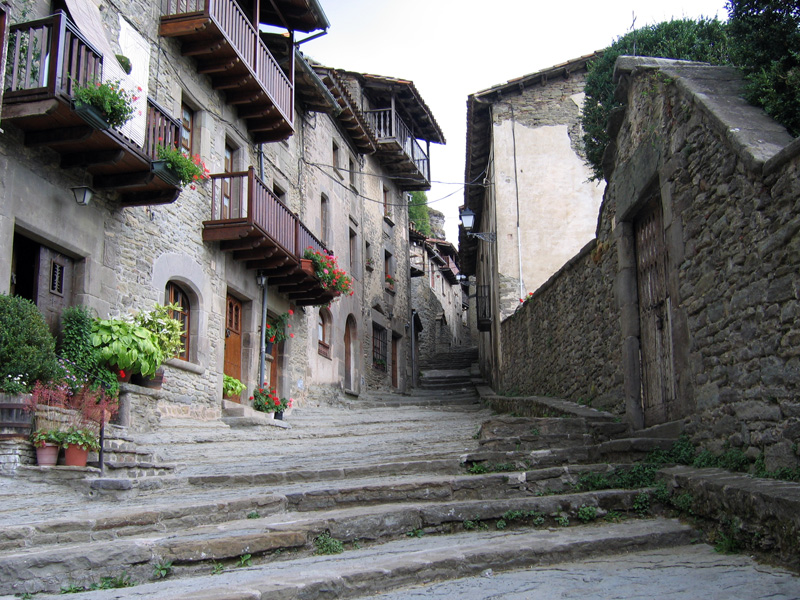
- Street in Rupit

- Flag Coat of arms

- Location in Catalonia
- Coordinates: 42°1′33″N 2°28′1″E
- Country: Spain
- Community: Catalonia
- Province: Barcelona
- Comarca: Osona

Government
  - Mayor: Albert Marce Pujol (2015)

Area
  - Total: 47.8 km^{2} (18.5 sq mi)

Population (2025-01-01)
  - Total: 280
  - Density: 5.9/km^{2} (15/sq mi)
- Website: rupitpruit.cat

Rupit i Pruit (Catalan pronunciation: [ruˈpit i ˈpɾujt]) is a municipality in the comarca of Osona in Catalonia, Spain situated in the Sierra de la Cabrera mountain range near Barcelona. It is made up of two formerly separate settlements, Rupit and Pruit, which were independent until 1977. The medieval village of Rupit emerged around the 12th century thanks to important local families. The most notable feature is its old town, which is connected by a suspension bridge. The largest waterfall in Catalonia at Sallent are nearby

== Villages ==
- Pruit
- Rupit
