= Riudellots de la Selva =

- Municipality
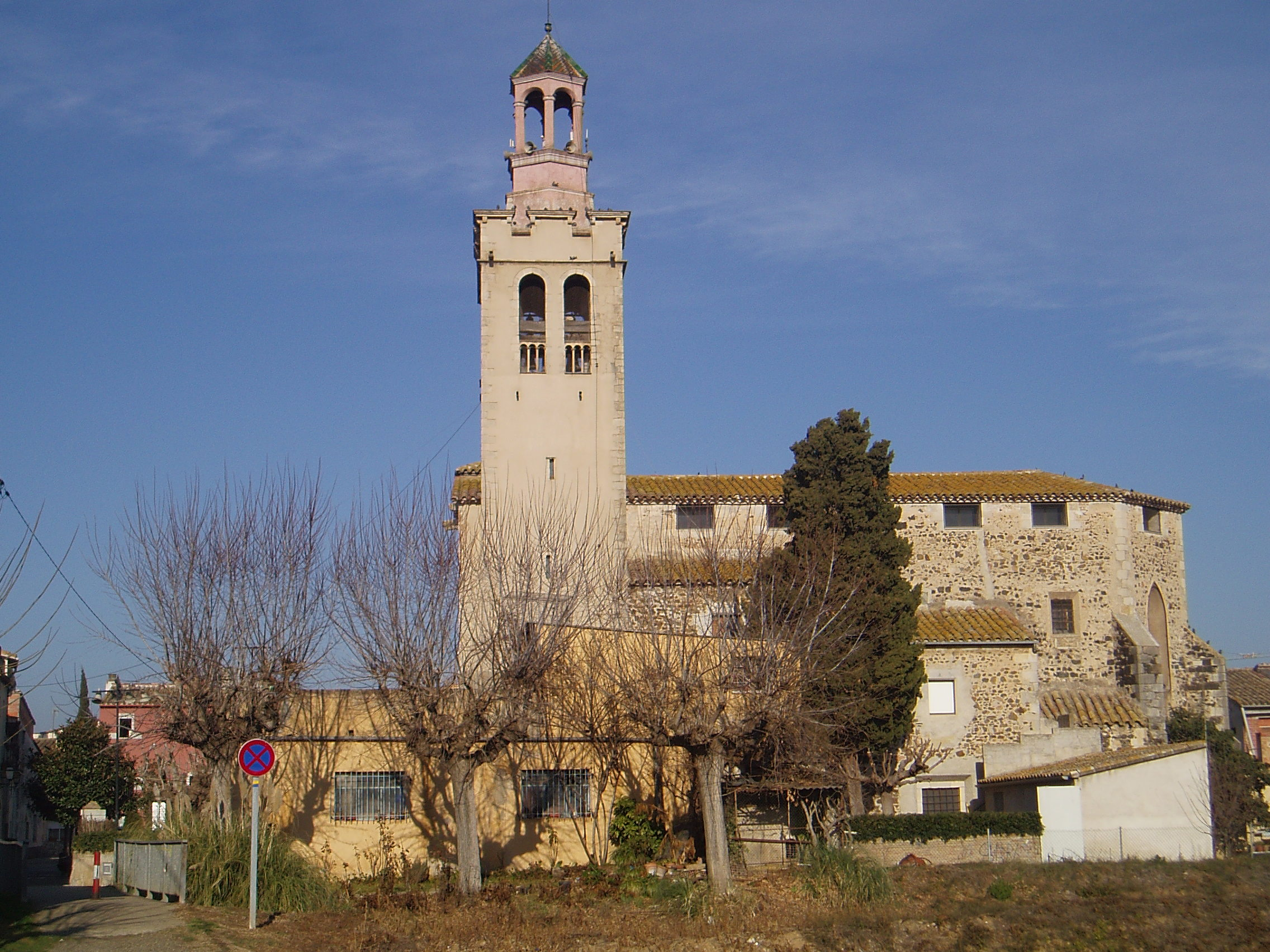

- Flag Coat of arms

- Location in Catalonia Riudellots de la Selva (Spain)
- Coordinates: 41.898°N 2.8115°E
- Country: Spain
- Community: Catalonia
- Province: Girona
- Comarca: Selva

Government
  - Mayor: Montserrat Roura Massaneda (2015)

Area
  - Total: 13.1 km^{2} (5.1 sq mi)
- Elevation: 98 m (322 ft)

Population (2025-01-01)
  - Total: 2,125
  - Density: 162/km^{2} (420/sq mi)
- Demonym: Riudellotenc
- Postal code: 17457
- Website: riudellots.cat

Riudellots de la Selva (Catalan pronunciation: [ˌriwðəˈʎodz ðə lə ˈsɛlβə]) is a municipality in the comarca of the Selva in Catalonia, Spain. It is situated in the basin of the Onyar river, on the A-7 autopista and the main N-II road, and is served by a Renfe railway station on the line between Barcelona and Girona and the GE-672 road and is close to the aeroport of Girona.

The Gothic church of Sant Esteve dates from the 16th century.
