= Susqueda =

- Municipality
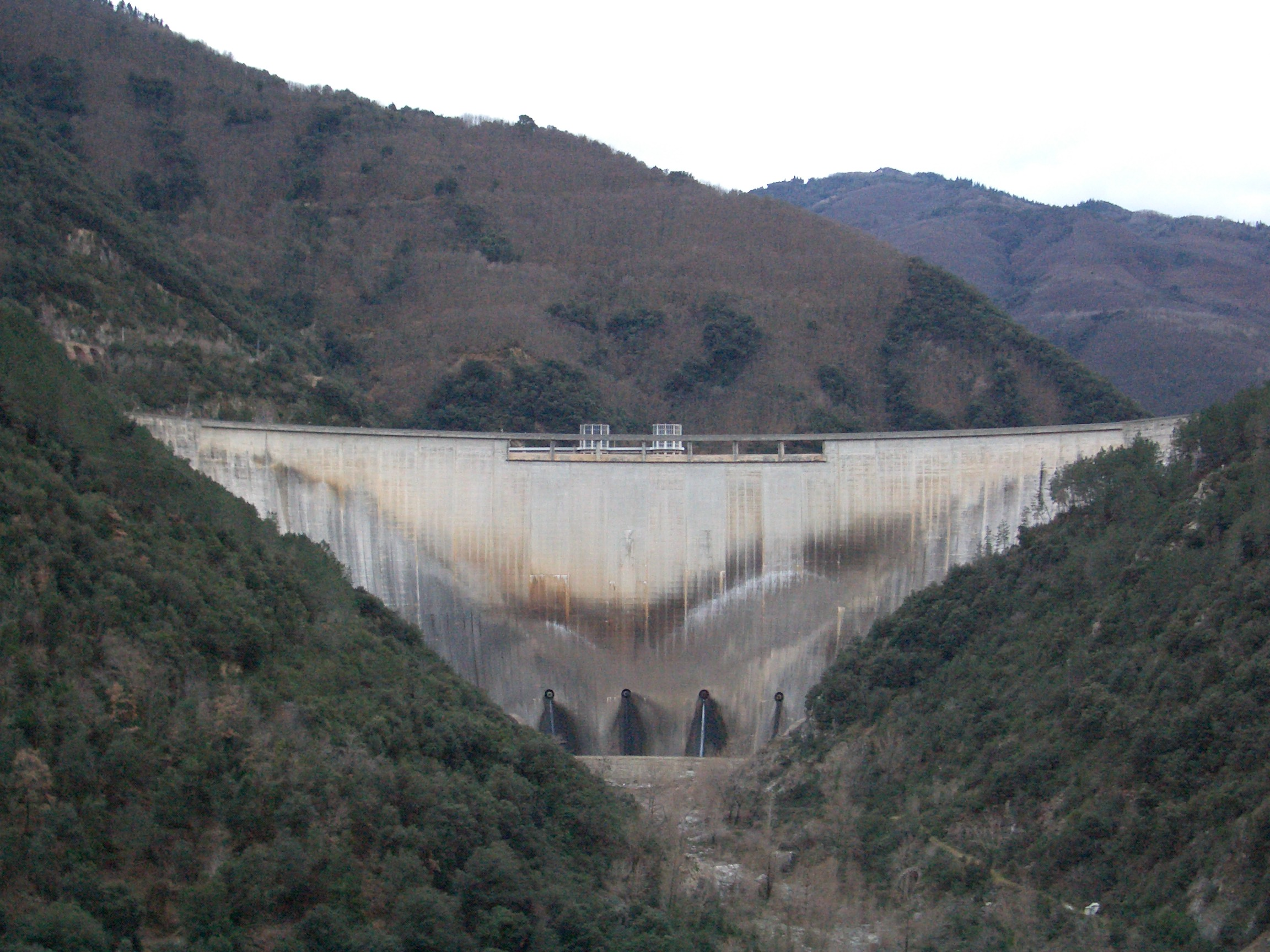

- Flag Coat of arms

- Location in Catalonia Susqueda (Spain)
- Coordinates: 41°59′N 2°31′E
- Country: Spain
- Community: Catalonia
- Province: Girona
- Comarca: Selva

Government
  - Mayor: Joan Mercader Arimany (2015)

Area
  - Total: 50.6 km^{2} (19.5 sq mi)
- Elevation: 100 m (330 ft)

Population (2025-01-01)
  - Total: 103
  - Density: 2.04/km^{2} (5.27/sq mi)
- Demonym(s): Susquedenc, susquedenca
- Website: www.susqueda.cat

Susqueda (Catalan pronunciation: [susˈkɛðə]) is a municipality in the comarca of the Selva in Catalonia, Spain. It is located in the Guilleries Massif area, on the left bank of the Ter river in the north-west of the comarca. The Susqueda reservoir is on the municipal territory, and the associated hydroelectric power station is an important source of local income. A local road links the municipality with the C-152 road to Santa Coloma de Farners.

== Demography ==
| 1900 | 1930 | 1950 | 1970 | 1986 | 2007 |
|---|---|---|---|---|---|
| 603 | 664 | 611 | 199 | 125 | 126 |
