= Osor, Spain =

Osor
- Municipality
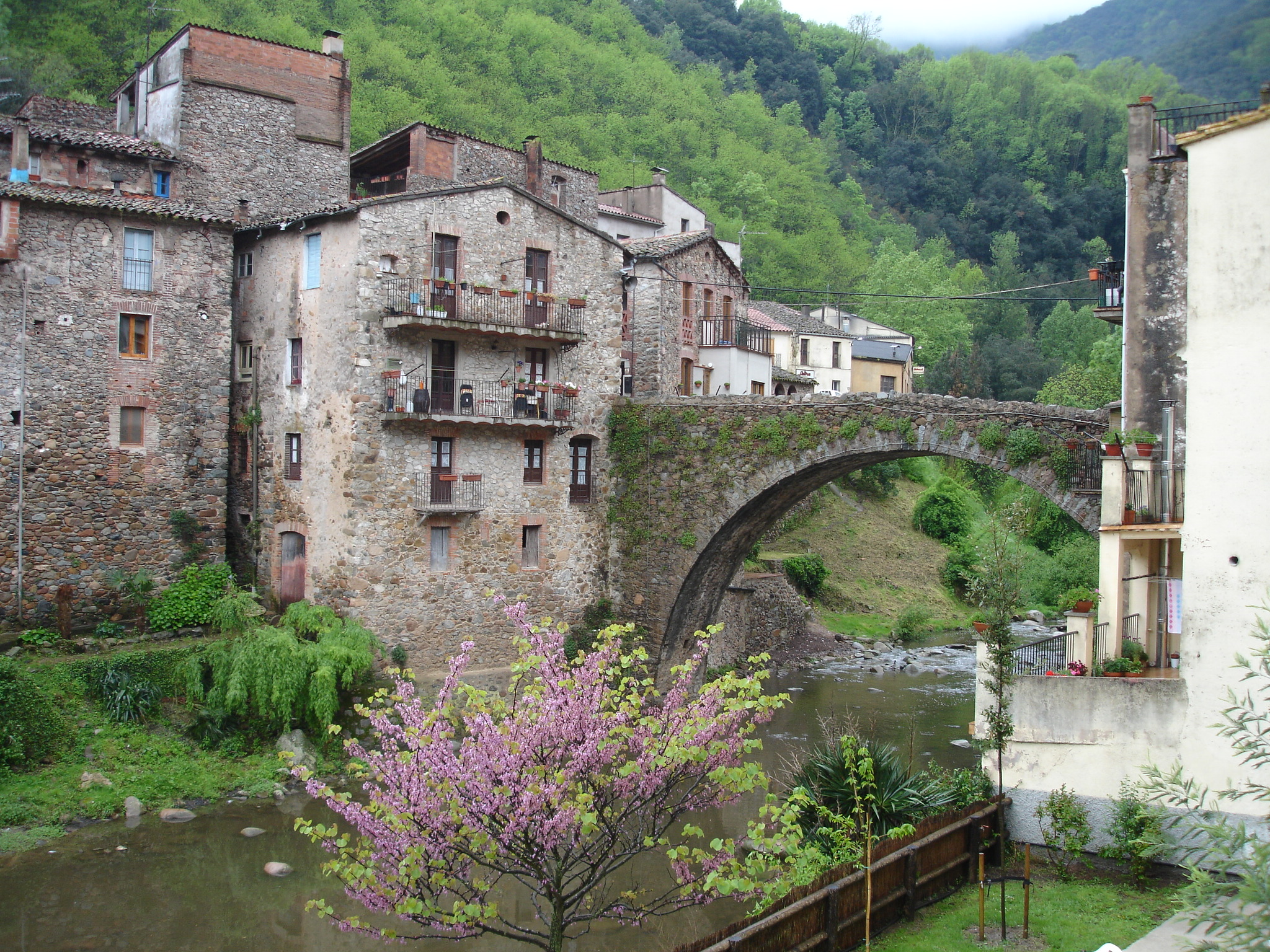
- View of Osor

- Coat of arms

- Location in Catalonia Osor (Spain)
- Coordinates: 41°56′51″N 2°33′25″E
- Country: Spain
- Community: Catalonia
- Province: Girona
- Comarca: Selva

Government
  - Mayor: Joan Pla Coll (2015)

Area
  - Total: 52.1 km^{2} (20.1 sq mi)
- Elevation: 340 m (1,120 ft)

Population (2025-01-01)
  - Total: 430
  - Density: 8.3/km^{2} (21/sq mi)
- Website: osor.cat

Osor (Catalan pronunciation: [uˈzo]) is a municipality in the comarca of la Selva in Catalonia, Spain.

== Main sights ==
- Pont Vell, 15th century bridge
- Sant Pere d'Osor church
