= Sant Hilari Sacalm =

- Municipality
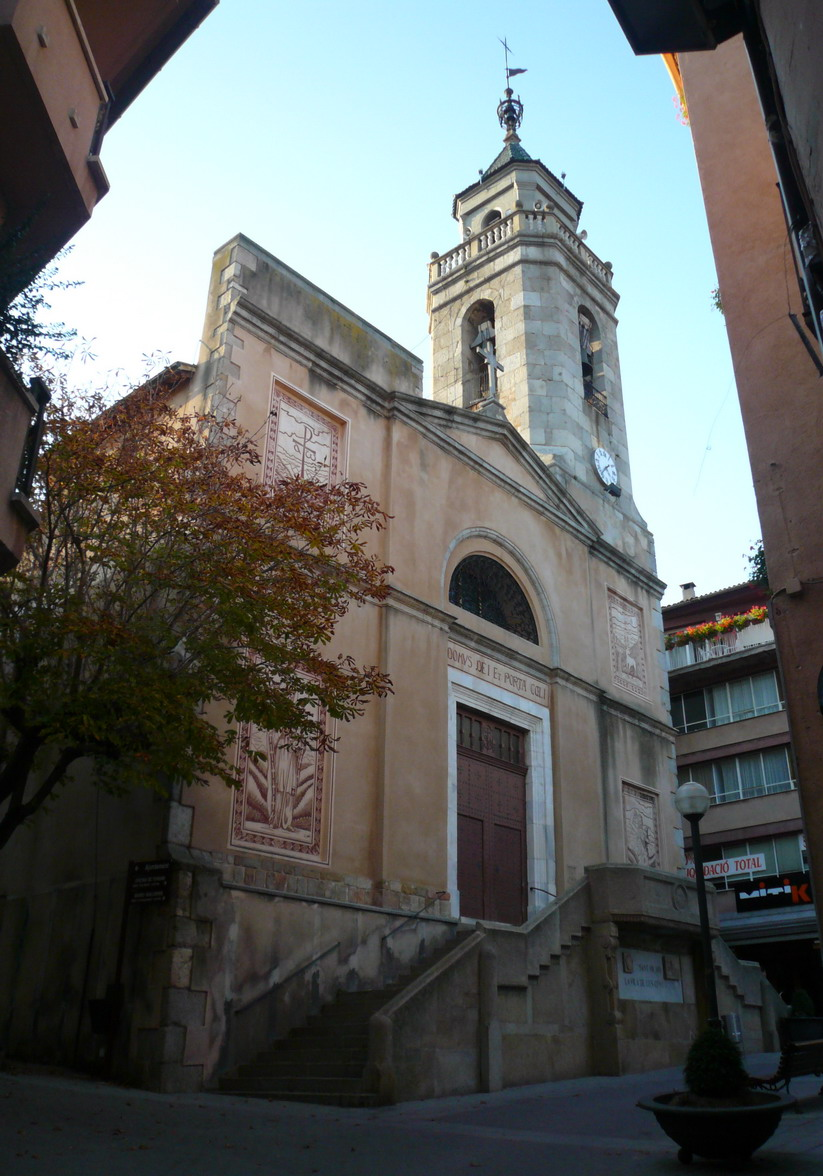

- Coat of arms

- Location in Catalonia Sant Hilari Sacalm (Spain)
- Coordinates: 41°52′46″N 2°30′46″E
- Country: Spain
- Community: Catalonia
- Province: Girona
- Comarca: Selva

Government
  - Mayor: Joan Ramon Veciana Martinez (2015)

Area
  - Total: 83.3 km^{2} (32.2 sq mi)
- Elevation: 792 m (2,598 ft)

Population (2025-01-01)
  - Total: 6,069
  - Density: 72.9/km^{2} (189/sq mi)
- Demonym: Hilarienc
- Postal code: 17403
- Website: www.santhilari.cat

Sant Hilari Sacalm (Catalan pronunciation: [ˈsant iˈlaɾi səˈkalm]) is a municipality in the comarca of the Selva in Catalonia, Spain.
