= Selva (comarca) =

- Comarca
- Country: Spain
- Autonomous community: Catalonia
- Region: Comarques Gironines
- Province: Girona and Barcelona
- Capital: Santa Coloma de Farners
- Municipalities: List: Amer, Anglès, Arbúcies, Blanes, Breda, Brunyola, Caldes de Malavella, La Cellera de Ter, Fogars de la Selva, Hostalric, Lloret de Mar, Massanes, Maçanet de la Selva, Osor, Riells i Viabrea, Riudarenes, Riudellots de la Selva, Sant Feliu de Buixalleu, Sant Hilari Sacalm, Sant Julià del Llor i Bonmatí, Santa Coloma de Farners, Sils, Susqueda, Tossa de Mar, Vidreres, Vilobí d'Onyar

Government
  - Body: La Selva Comarcal Council
  - President: Martí Pujals (Junts)

Area
  - Total: 994.9 km^{2} (384.1 sq mi)
- Demonym(s): selvatà (m.) selvatana (f.)
- Time zone: UTC+1 (CET)
  - Summer (DST): UTC+2 (CEST)
- Largest municipality: Blanes

Selva (Catalan pronunciation: [ˈsɛlβə]) is a coastal comarca (county) in the Girona region of Catalonia (Spain), located between the mountain range known as the Serralada Transversal or Puigsacalm and the Costa Brava (part of the Mediterranean coast). Following the Spanish province system, it is divided between the provinces of Girona and Barcelona, with Fogars de la Selva being part of Barcelona province and all other municipalities falling inside the Girona province.

Its capital, Santa Coloma de Farners, is no longer among its larger municipalities, with the coastal towns of Blanes and Lloret de Mar having far surpassed it in size. Selva borders the comarques of Maresme, Vallès Oriental, Osona, Garrotxa, Gironès, and Baix Empordà.

== Municipalities ==
Municipality	Population (2014)	Area km^{2}
Amer	2,281	40.1
Anglès	5,606	16.3
Arbúcies	6,481	86.2
Blanes	39,293	17.7
Breda	3,751	5.0
Brunyola	391	36.8
Caldes de Malavella	7,130	57.3
La Cellera de Ter	2,071	14.6
Fogars de la Selva	1,512	32.1
Hostalric	4,010	3.4
Lloret de Mar	38,624	48.7
Maçanet de la Selva	6,963	45.6
Massanes	723	26.1
Osor	452	52.1
Riells i Viabrea	4,000	27.0
Riudarenes	2,148	47.6
Riudellots de la Selva	2,026	13.1
Sant Feliu de Buixalleu	776	61.9
Sant Hilari Sacalm	5,681	83.3
Sant Julià del Llor i Bonmatí	1,264	9.7
Santa Coloma de Farners	12,601	70.6
Sils	5,851	29.9
Susqueda	95	50.6
Tossa de Mar	5,681	38.6
Vidreres	7,702	48.0
Vilobí d'Onyar	3,136	32.6
• Total: 26	170,249	994.9
