= Serra de la Vall de la Torre =

Serra de la Vall
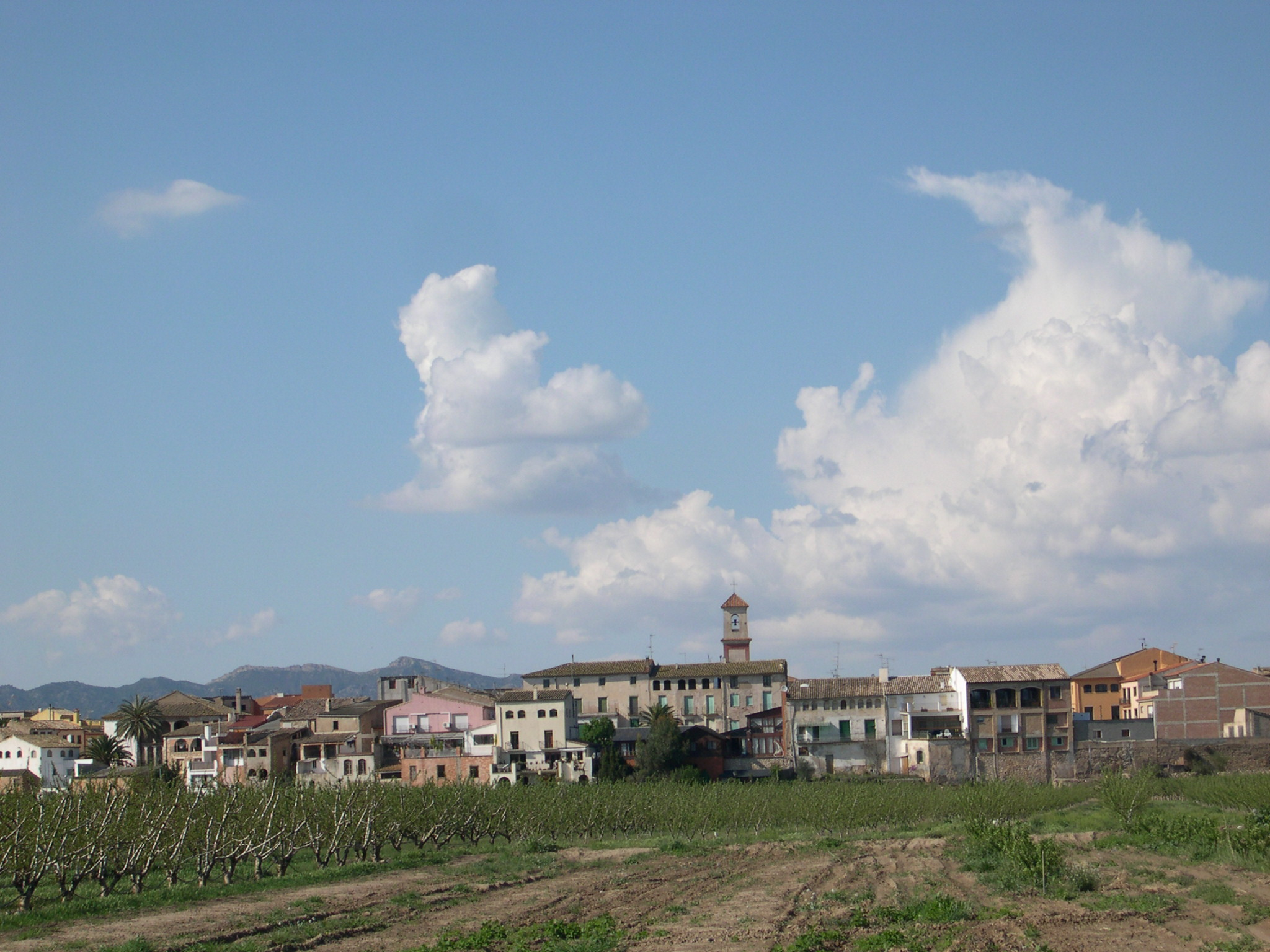
- Serra de La Vall rising behind Benissanet

Highest point
- Elevation: 450.8 m (1,479 ft)
- Coordinates: 41°4′47.93″N 0°31′19.34″E

Geography
- Location within Catalonia
- Location: Ribera d'Ebre (Catalonia)
- Parent range: Catalan Pre-Coastal Range

Geology
- Mountain type: Limestone

Climbing
- Easiest route: Drive from Benissanet

Serra de la Vall de la Torre, also known as Serra de la Vall, is a mountain range located at the southern end of the Catalan Pre-Coastal Range, Catalonia, Spain. The ridge's highest point is 450.8 m. This mountain range lies within the Benissanet and Corbera d'Ebre municipal term. It is a smaller and lower northern prolongation of the Serra de Cavalls.

In the valley formed between this range and the Serra de Cavalls there is an ancient castle known as Torre de la Vall.

== History ==
These mountains, along with Serra de Pàndols and Serra de Cavalls further south, as well as the Serra de la Fatarella in the north, were the scenario of bloody battles during the Battle of the Ebro in the Spanish Civil War (1936 - 39). The Ebro Battle was also the last action of the International Brigades, who were withdrawn midway through it.

== See also ==
- Siege of Gandesa (1938)
- International Brigades
- Catalan Pre-Coastal Range

== Bibliography ==
- Jaume Aguadé i Sordé, El diari de guerra de Lluís Randé i Inglés; Batalles del Segre i de l’Ebre i camps de concentració (abril 1938 - juliol 1939), El Tinter ISBN 84-9791-082-6
