= Francesc Xavier Hernández Cardona =

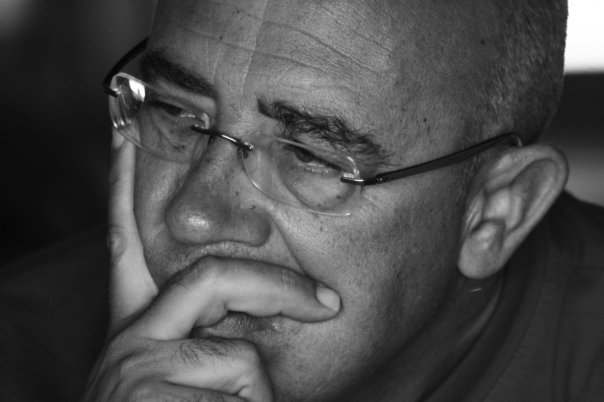
Francesc Xavier Hernández Cardona

Francesc Xavier Hernández Cardona (Barcelona, 1954) is a Catalan historian, Professor of Didactics of Social Sciences of the University of Barcelona.

In 1979 he got a degree in Philosophy and Literature, Section of Modern and Contemporary History, at the University of Barcelona, with the thesis entitled "The MLE (Spanish Libertarian Movement) and its development in Catalonia (1939-1945)", directed by Josep Termes.

In 1993 he earned a doctorate at the same university with the thesis (in Catalan) titled "The History of Catalonia in the Primary and Secondary School (1975-1990)", directed by Pelai Pagès.

He has developed his research and teaching career in specialties like didactics of history and social sciences, didactics of heritage, historical iconography, didactic museography and the military history of Catalonia.

== Academic and management career ==
Since 1979 he worked as a lecturer in the University School of Teacher Education for Educación General Básica (EGB) of the University of Barcelona. In 1984 he became a tenured lecturer of the University School, and in 1995 a tenured lecturer at the University of Barcelona, where in 2003 he obtained the Chair as professor of didactics of the social sciences.

From 1999 to 2002 he served as President of the Division of Education Sciences of the University of Barcelona and since 2008 to 2015 was Director of the Department of Didactics of Social Sciences at the same institution. On behalf of the party Esquerra Republicana de Catalunya ("Republican Left of Catalonia"), he was the General Director of Research of the Generalitat de Catalunya ("Government of Catalonia") in the tripartite government of Pasqual Maragall from 2003 to 2006, while Carles Solà was Counselor of the Department of Universities, Research and Information Society. He renewed his charge as General Director of Research during the first months of the second tripartite government, while Josep Huguet was Counselor of the Department of Innovation, Universities and Enterprise. In March 2007 he resigned because in his opinion the government did not give strategic priority to research.

As General Director General of Research strengthened the system of research in Catalonia and promoted the creation of numerous recognized centers. During this time several institutions were launched to form the backbone of the Catalan research system:

- The Superocomputador Mare Nostrum (Centre de Supercomputació de Barcelona, "Supercomputing Center of Barcelona")
- The Parc de Recerca Biomèdica de Barcelona (PRBB, "Biomedical Research Park of Barcelona")
- The Institut de Recerca Biomèdica de Barcelona (IRBB, "Biomedical Research Institute of Barcelona")
- The Institut de Bioenginyeria de Catalunya (IBEC, "Bioengineering Institute of Catalonia")
- The Institut Català de Nanotecnologia (ICN, "Catalan Institute of Nanotechnology")
- The Institut Català de Paleontologia Miquel Crusafont ("Miquel Crusafont Catalan Institute of Paleontology")
- The Institut Català de Recerca de l'Aigua (ICRA, "Catalan Institute of Water Research")
- The Institut de Recerca en Energia de Catalunya (IREC, "Energy Research Institute of Catalonia")
- The Institut Català de Ciències del Clima (IC3, "Catalan Institute of Climate Sciences")
- The Centre de Recerca en Epidemiologia Ambiental (CREAL, "Center for Environmental Epidemiology Research")
- The Centre de Medecina Regenerativa de Barcelona (CMRB, "Center for Regenerative Medicine of Barcelona")
- The Centre de Recerca en Salut Internacional de Barcelona (CRESIB, "Center for International Health Research of Barcelona")
- The Institut de Medecina Predictiva i Personalitzada del Càncer (IMPPC, "Predictive and Personalized Cancer Medicine Institute")
- The Centre de Recerca en Agrigenòmica (CRA, "Center for Agrigenomics Research")
- The Institut Català de Recerca en Patrimoni Cultural (ICRPC, "Catalan Institute for Cultural Heritage Research")
- The Institut Català de Paleoecologia Humana i Evolució Social (ICPHES, "Catalan Institute for Human Paleocology and Social Evolutionary)
- The Centre Esther Koplowitz (CEK, "Esther Koplowitz Center")

He also collaborated in strengthening and creating new headquarters of research centres such as:

- The Institut de Ciències Fotòniques (ICFO, "Institute for Photonics Sciences")
- The Institut Català d'Investigació Química (ICIQ, "Catalan Institute of Chemical Investigation")
- The Institut d'Investigacions Biomèdiques August Pi i Sunyer (IDIBAPS, "August Pi i Sunyar Biomedical Research Institute")
- The Centre Tecnològic de Telecomunicacions de Catalunya (CTTC, "Telecommunications Technology Center of Catalonia")
- The Institut d'Estudis Espacials de Catalunya (IEEC, "Spacial Studies Institute of Catalonia")
- The Institut Català d'Arqueologia Clàssica (ICAC, "Catalan Classical Archeology Institute")

The ALBA Synchrotron works were undertaken during his tenure. In order to generate a powerful research network, he promoted the creation of a Catalan Agency for Research, inspired by the German model of the Max Planck Society and the Fraunhofer Society, an attempt which did not succeed because the seventh legislature came to a sudden end. For the same reason it was not possible to enact a Law of Science giving coverage to research strategies. He tried to link organically the Catalan research system with the French one, and important advances were aborted by the political situation.

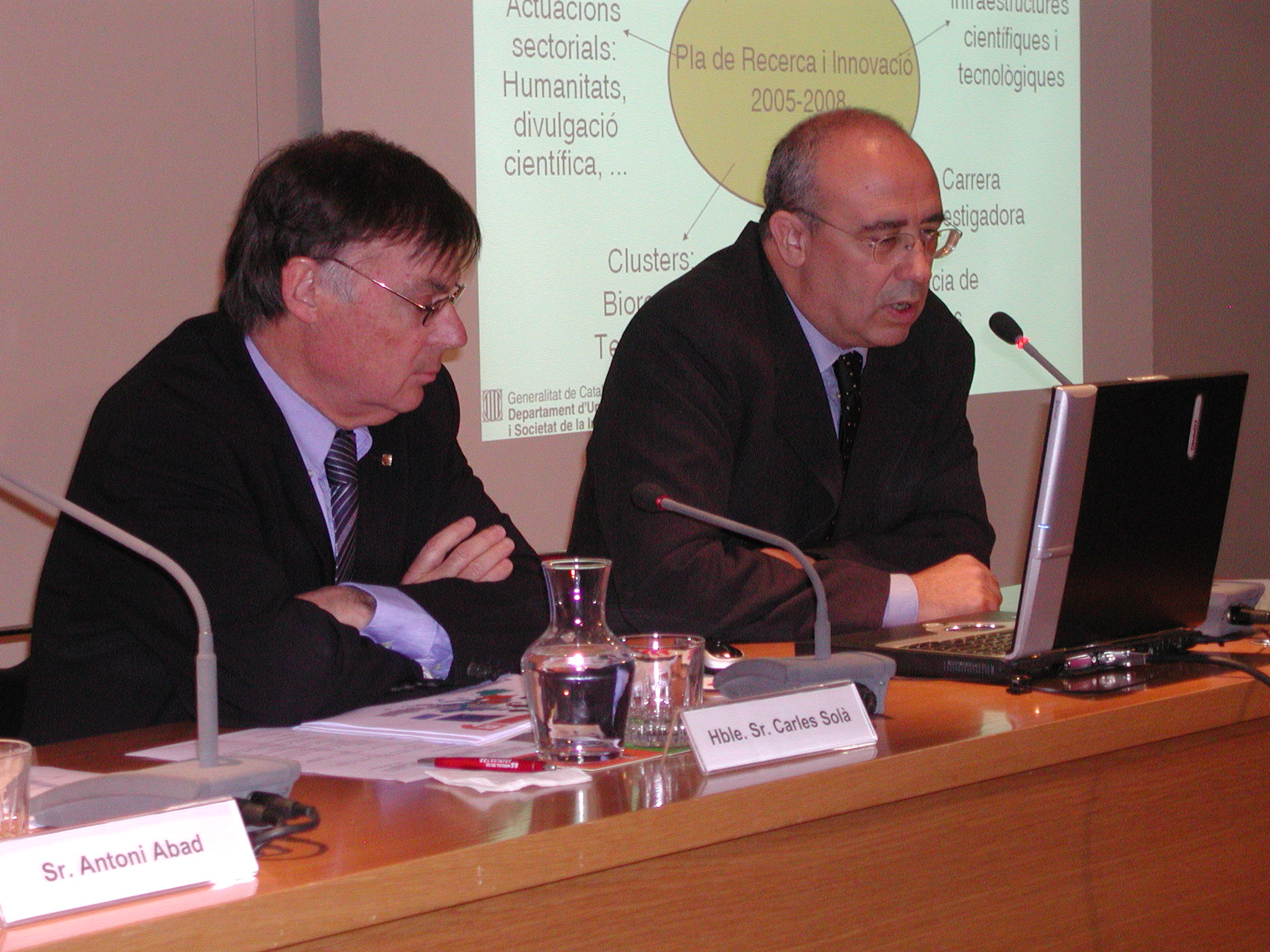
Francesc Xavier Hernández Cardona (General Director of Research of the Generalitat de Catalunya, 2003–2006) with Carles Solà, Counselor of the Department of Universities, Research and Information Society.

Among the measures that he drove: the transformation of FI scholarship programme into contracts of employment of 3 years (plus 1 of previous grant); the creation of post-doctoral programme Beatriu de Pinós, oriented to the employment insertion of research personnel in companies; the creation of the Junior ICREA programme and the stabilization of the researchers belonging to the programme Ramon y Cajal. These initiatives were meant to lay the foundations of a research career in Catalonia. He also systematized and prompted calls and various research structures like the SGR (Support Grups de Recerca; a Support for research groups), ARIE (Ajunts per a la Recerca, Innovació i Educació); XIRE (Xarxes d'Innovació i Recerca Educativa); or Excava, to promote Catalan archaeological missions abroad (Althiburos, Oxirrinc, Bactriana, Syria, among others).

Aside from these initiatives he also made possible the work of prominent researchers in Catalonia, such as Joan Massagué, Manuel Perucho or Juan Carlos Izpisúa.

== History and Didactics of History ==
He worked as a teacher in primary and secondary education. His career as university-tenured lecturer and Professor of university has been linked to the teaching of the social sciences, didactics of history and didactics of Catalonian heritage.

He took part in the most diverse initiatives of educational research and innovation. He was the editor of the experimental curricula projects of social and cultural environment (primary education) and social sciences (12-16) for the educational reform promoted by the Generalitat de Catalunya at the end of the 20th century.

He is a member of the editorial board of the journal Guix and was founder and co-director of the journal Iber: Didactics of Social Sciences, Geography and History. He did research on textbooks and has also generated models for Primary and Secondary School based on the interaction between image and text, which have been widely replicated since the end of the 20th century to the present day. Major collections include Barcanova and Teide.

Hernández has also collaborated in the development of new types of educational materials based on the design of books of activities which integrate documentation and learning resources. He advocates for the application of the scientific method in the classroom, has developed various proposals to promote, using the discovery strategy, the work with different types of historical sources. In this sense, he conducted his doctoral thesis on the image of Catalonia in textbooks during post-Franco age: "La Història de Catalunya a l'ensenyament primari i secundari (1975-1990)".

He is author of numerous articles and books of theoretical reflection on the teaching of history and Social Sciences: Didáctica de las Ciencias Sociales; Ensenyar Història de Catalunya; 12 ideas clave: Enseñar y aprender historia. He has also written several books to disseminate history, as well as monographs on unique topics. He has published many papers and books of history including several synthesis of the history of Catalonia.

He has been main investigator of many competitive projects, among other four R&D of the Spanish "National Plan for Research". The bodies of the State (CNEAI) have recognized his work as researcher by granting him with four periods of six years ("Sexenios de investigación" in Spanish).

== Historical iconography ==
He has developed several works of innovation and research focused on the importance of didactic iconography in history, and has applied the results in the preparation of social dissemination and textbooks. He has also developed models of virtual reconstruction of archaeological sites that help formulate hypotheses about parts and uses of buildings and urban ensembles.

He has tackled the challenge of recreating the evolution of a city in a limited space. The work carried out on the Iberian Citadel of Calafell (Tarragona); the Iberian settlement of Puig Castellar (Santa Coloma de Gramenet, Barcelona); the site of Empúries (Girona) and the recreation of the Roman city of Althiburos (Tunisia) and the city of Barcelona in the 18th century, among others, are the most outstanding experiences.

On the basis of the contributions of the British illustrator David Macaulay, he has created generic models of city and has recreated the evolution of its iconography over time. This work was developed in collaboration with the extraordinary illustrator Jordi Ballonga. The results were published by the Milanese publishing Jaca Book between 1990 and 1993, translated into different languages, and published in different countries (Italy, France, United Kingdom, Hungary, Netherlands, Romania, Tunisia, Spain -Catalan and Spanish editions-, United States, Japan and Germany). Three city models were designed: BARMI, a Mediterranean city in southern Europe; LEBEK, a city in Northern Europe; and SAN RAFAEL, a city in Central America.

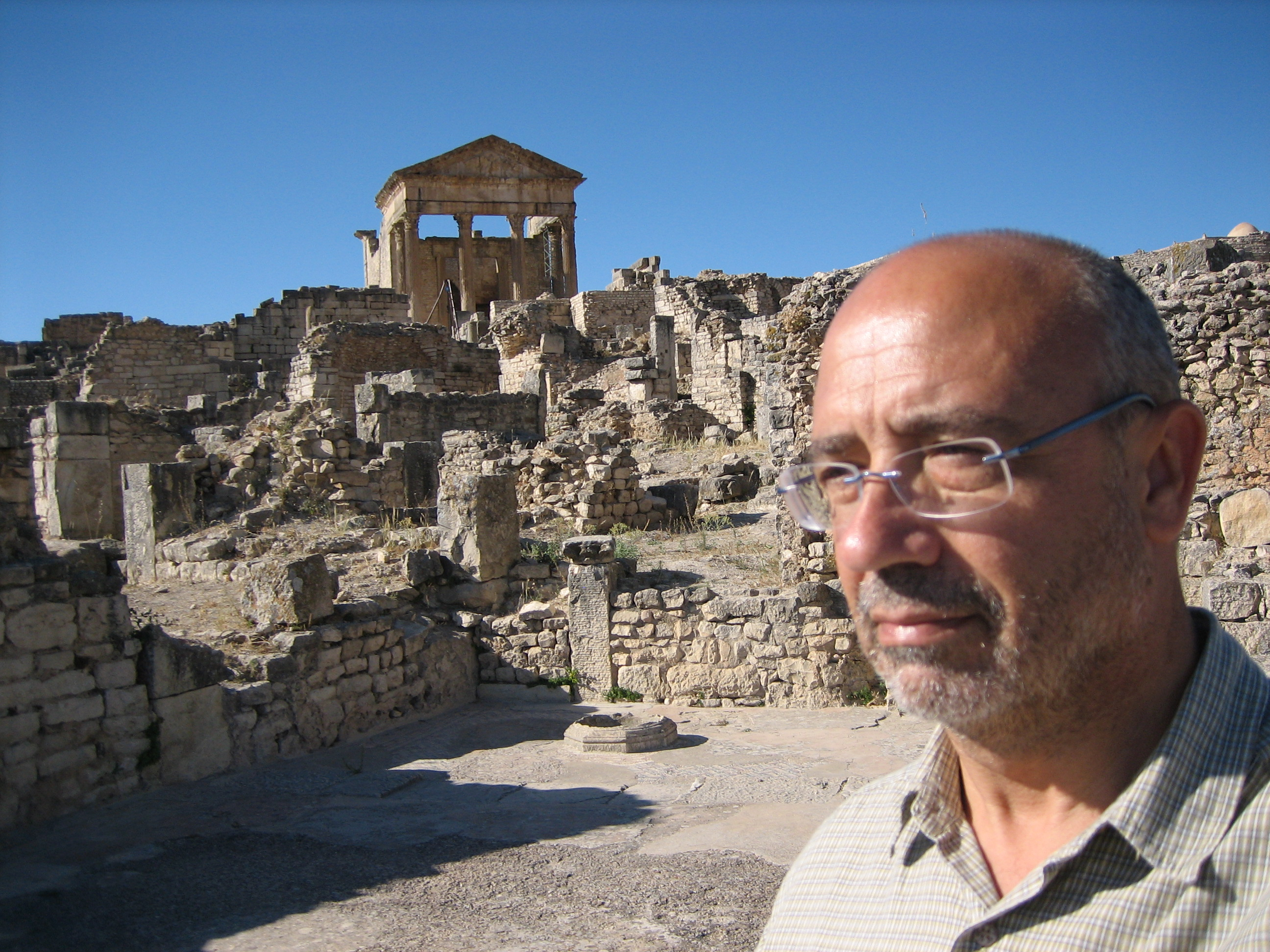
Francesc Xavier Hernández Cardona, specialist in Didactics of History and Heritage, has developed models of iconography on the historical evolution of urban centres.

In the context of the tricentennial commemorations in Barcelona of the end of the Siege of Barcelona (1713-1714), and in collaboration with Guillem Hernández Pongiluppi, he presented an ambitious iconographic proposal around the siege of Barcelona in 1713-1714 and the battle of 11 September. He has also collaborated with various artists (John Chien, Francesc Riart, Guillem Hernández, Mar Hernández) on issues related to the military defense and fortification, military technology and weaponry. Noteworthy is the impulse of new iconographic, digital strategies and matte painting, with illustrators such as Guillem Hernández Pongiluppi and Mar Hernández Pongiluppi.

== Didactic museology ==
He started his activities in museography in 1992, working on the project of partial restoration of the Iberian Citadel of Calafell (Tarragona), inspired by the educational experience of Lejre (Denmark). The relationship with Calafell finished with the musealisation of 1996. Almost in parallel, he coordinated the historical and museological executive project of the History Museum of Catalonia, which is implemented in a record time of 18 months and that was one of the first models in Europe in the field of didactic and interactive museology on history. The relationship of consultancy with the Museum ended in 1997 because of the regressive policy, in terms of interactive museography, imposed by the direction of the Museum. In the following years he criticized the policies driven by the direction teams of the Museum, the falsification and degradation of the original project and the lack of goals of the institution.

He has been commissioner (along with Joaquim Torra) of the temporary exhibition "Donec Perficiam" installed in 2013 at the Born in Barcelona. It was one of the most visited temporary exhibitions of the city. The work explained the siege of Barcelona and stands as a model in museography by its modern conception, by the success of visitors, by the variety of museological strategies used, and also because of a quick design and implementation at low cost. Definitely it was the most successful exhibition in the context of the celebration of the 300th anniversary of 1714.

In his museography works he has promoted the concepts of didactic museology and educational heritage, assuming that the democratization of the access to knowledge requires museological and museographical proposals with a capacity to be understood by a broad target horizon.

In collaboration with Dr. Joan Santacana Mestre created in 2000 the research group "Didactics of Heritage, Comprehensive museology and new technologies" (DIDPATRI) and, within the framework of the Foundation Bosch i Gimpera and the Attica project, the quasi-firm "Projects Workshop: Heritage and museology".

He has coordinated and worked in numerous museological and museographic projects. Among others, he has participated in the design of projects for centers such as the Archaeological Museum of Catalonia, the monumental site of Empúries and the Maritime Museum of Barcelona. He has also worked in various executive projects as:

- Walls of Ceuta (Spain)
- Walls of Melilla (Spain)
- Castros and Verracos Trail (Salamanca, Spain)
- Interpretation Centre of Madina Yabisa (Ibiza, Spain)
- Walls of Dalt Vila (Ibiza, Spain)
- Interpretation Centre of Republican Aviation and Air War (Santa Margarida i els Monjos, Barcelona, Spain)
- Interpretation Centre of Talamanca Battle (Barcelona, Spain)
- Audiovisual Room at the San Fernando Castle (Figueres, Girona, Spain)

He collaborated in the founding of the UB-Projects project, an agreement between the University of Barcelona and the Euphon Group, and other collaboration agreements with different companies. He was co-director of the master's degree in Didactics of Museology (Les Heures-University of Barcelona).

He has directed several doctoral theses on aspects of history, heritage, museology and didactics (Dr. Josep Antoni Serra, Dr. Rafael Sospedra, Dr. Andreu Besolí, Dr. Ismael Almazán, Dr. Xavier Rubio, Dr. David Íñiguez and Dr. Pilar Molina).

He is author of numerous works and articles on museology and museology, such as Museologia crítica and Museos de historia. Entre la taxidermia y el nomadismo, both co-authored with Joan Santacana.

Hernández has participated in the didactic and cultural proposal for the revitalization of the excavations at Althiburos (Tunis).

He is coordinator of the consolidated research group of the Generalitat de Catalunya "DIDPATRI: Didactics of Cultural Heritage" (SGR 2009–245; SGR 2012–945), whose research focuses on the field of didactic museography.

Lately, he works on projects related to emerging lines of research such as museology and iconography, digital iconographic resources and uses of internet for museographic purposes.

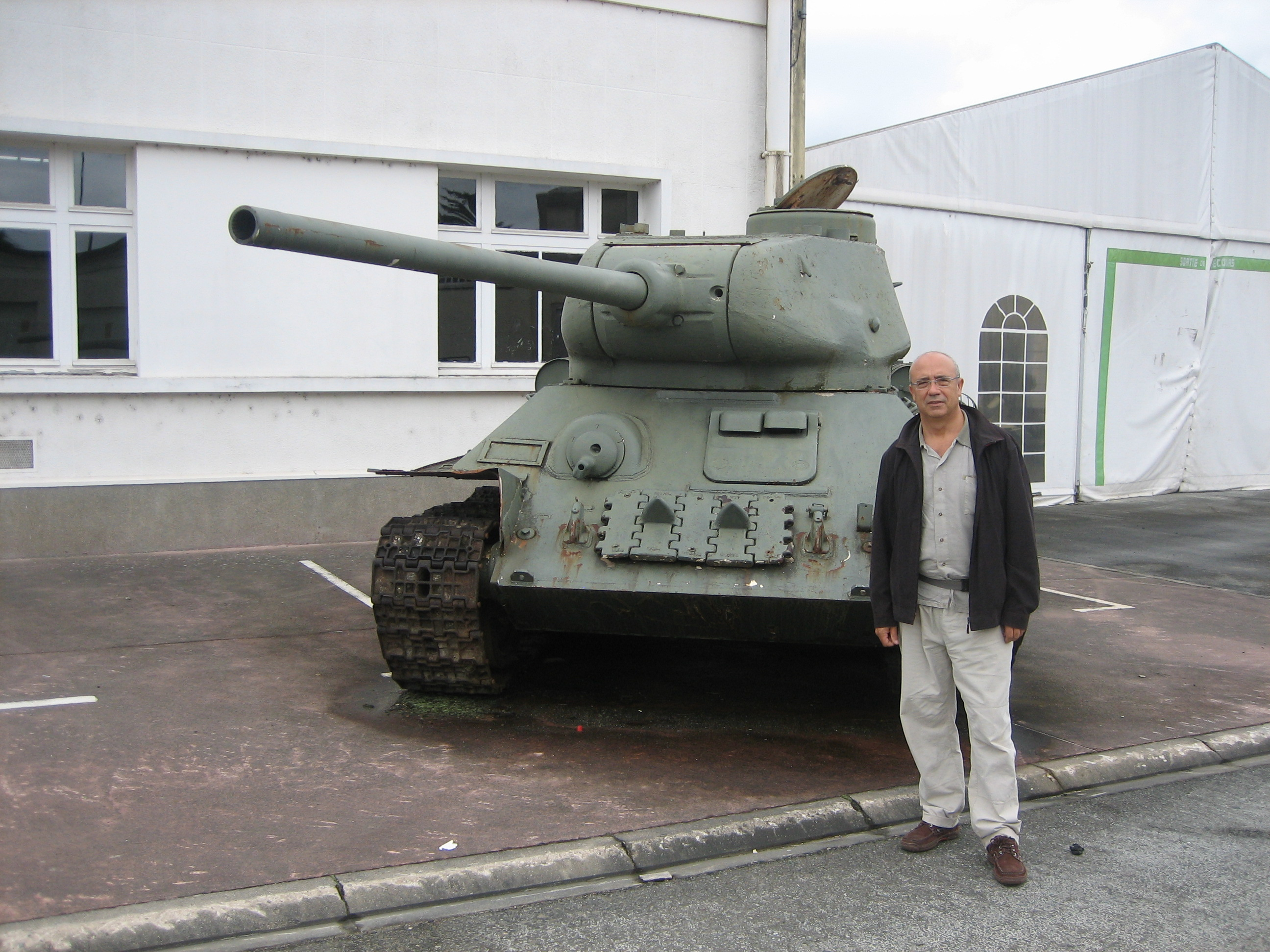
Francesc Xavier Hernández Cardona has developed numerous works and researches in the field of military history.

== Military history ==
He has a specialization in military history and currently is developing work and research in this field. One of his most emblematic works is the publication in 4 volumes of the military history of Catalonia (Història Militar de Catalunya), as well as the supplementary material elaborated together with Francesc Riart on uniforms of the armies during the War of the Spanish Succession, the Coronela and uniform studies in the Catalan countries.

Among the most notable unique contributions is the interpretation of the battles of Empúries (195 BC) and Battle of Muret (1213); as well as the hypotheses about the geography of Empúries during ancient and medieval periods, proposals drawn up based on the use of primary sources, simulation, game theory, fieldwork and aerial photograph. He actively promoted the recovery of the historical landscapes of the Battle of the Ebro, with works of research and dissemination: Ebro 1938 and La Batalla de l'Ebre: Història, paisatge i patrimoni. He has carried out field activities to identify specific areas of the battlefield and also participated in civic campaigns in defense of the integrity of the mountains of Pàndols and Cavalls (Tarragona).

Regarding his archaeological works, he took park as member of DIDPATRI in the excavation of La Fatarella battlefield in collaboration with CSIC and the Association Lo Riu, and have also been relevant his works in the fields of Republican Aviation in the Penedés area in collaboration with the Institut d'Estudis Penedesencs.

He was author to the first attempt to write a Management Plan of the Historical Landscapes of the battle of the Ebro promoted by the Ministry of Territorial Policy and Public Works of the Generalitat de Catalunya.

Hernández has studied together with Francesc Riart and Xavier Rubio, the problem of creation of the Catalan army and La Coronela in 1713–1714. In collaboration with Francesc Riart has written the first illustrated atlas of uniform studies of the Catalan Countries and has also worked on the innovative work undertaken by Xavier Rubio on historical analysis, simulation and supercomputing. He was founder and first co-Editor of the journal Ebre 38: Revista Internacional de la Guerra Civil Espanyola (1936-1939). He has participated in the musealisation of large military sites: Dalt Vila (Ibiza), Walls of Ceuta and Melilla. Also has coordinated or participated in the first archaeological excavations of battlefields in Catalonia: Talamanca (2008), Cardedeu (2008), Prats de Rei (2009), Vesper de la Gloriosa (2010), Ordal (2010) and La Fatarella (2011).

== History of Barcelona and of the Cerdà Plan ==
His interest in the history of Barcelona has resulted in a co-authored work: "Passat i present de Barcelona", written between 1983 and 1991 in collaboration with Magda Fernández, Mercè Tatjer, Mercè Vidal and Alicia Suárez. Three edited volumes and a non-published fourth one show in a didactic fashion the evolution of the city of Barcelona from the origins up to the Olympic Games in 1992. Later, he wrote as a single author a synthesis of history of the city and several works on the history of the District of Sants. Of special interest was the recovery and publication of the inventory of the Vapor Vell de Sants in the year 1847, a crucial document to better understand the process of industrialization in Barcelona.

One of his most relevant contributions has been the cabalistic theory in the design of the Eixample quarter of Barcelona. Francesc Xavier Hernández has propugned the possibility of Ildefonso Cerdà as a designer of a new city as the capital of a new country, based on the Kabbalah, in the context of the rise of the Catalan Freemasonry during the 19th century.

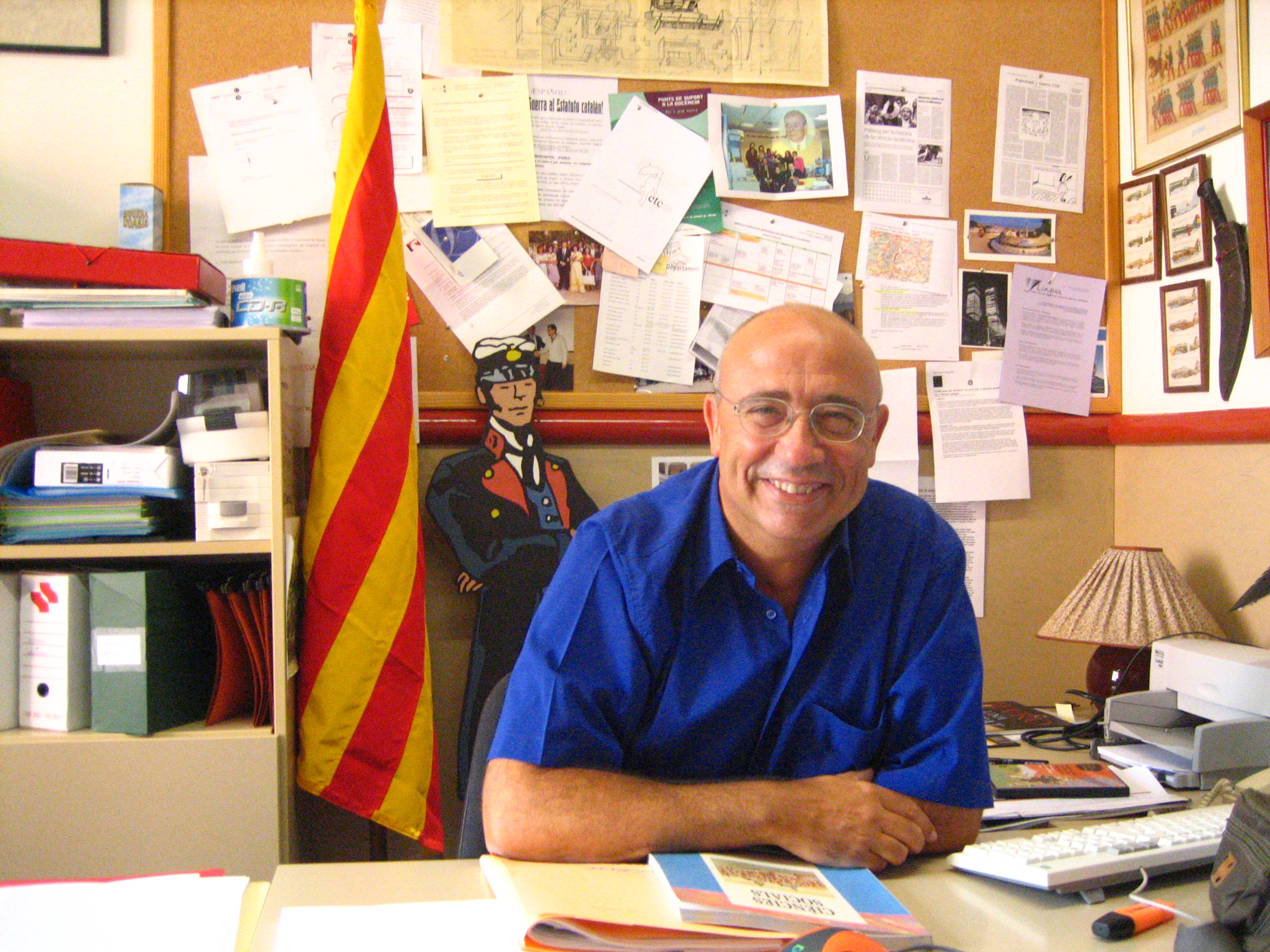
Francesc Xavier Hernández Cardona is Professor of Didactics of Social Sciences of the University of Barcelona.

== Social and political activity ==
Hernández has been involved in various civic movements in defence of Catalonian heritage. His contribution was relevant in the campaign in defense of the Vapor Vell de Sants, which was emblematic as it marked the beginning of the recovery of the industrial heritage in Catalonia. Also participated in the defense of the mountains of Pàndols and Cavalls against the installation of wind farms. His activism was important in the processes of defense and recovery of the historical landscapes of the Battle of the Ebro and other sites related to the Spanish Civil War. He participated very actively in the defense of the historical site of the Born market of Barcelona and its archaeological remains on the street of Sant Honorat.

As General Director of Research of the Generalitat de Catalunya, he decidedly opposed Ley de Fosas because in his understanding it was an instrument to prevent research on disappeared persons during the Spanish Civil War in Catalonia. At the same time he provided the funds to start the excavation of mass graves in Catalonia, which was neutralized by the Memorial Democràtic and the Vice President of the Catalan Government environment. Some of the archaeological campaigns in which he participated between 2003 and 2011, involving the recovery of bodies of soldiers (Albinyana, Gandesa, Castellbisbal, La Fatarella) were disabled or sabotaged by the Generalitat.

Finally, Hernández has taken part in neighbourhood movements and he has served on several occasions as a union representative. Since 1970 he was against Francoist Spain and also participated actively in the promotion of militant democracy in different parties and labor unions.

== Publications ==
- Fernández, M.; Hernández, F.X.; Suárez, A.; Tatjer, M.; Vidal, M. (1983). Passat i present de Barcelona. Materials per l’estudi del medi urbà. Barcelona: ICE-Universitat de Barcelona
- Hernández, F.X. (1984). Lluci Emili Patern: legionari i ciutadà romà. Barcelona: Diputació de Barcelona
- Hernández, F.X. (1990). Ensenyar història de Catalunya. Barcelona: Graó
- Casas, J.; Fernández, M.; Hernández, F.X. (1992). El vapor Aymerich, Amat i Jover. Barcelona: Publicacions del Museu Nacional de la Ciència i de la Tècnica de Catalunya/Generalitat de Catalunya
- Hernández, F.X. (1993). Barcelona, història d'una ciutat. Barcelona: Llibres de l'Índex
- Hernández, F.X. (2001-2004). Història militar de Catalunya: aproximació didàctica. 4 vols. Barcelona: Rafael Dalmau
- Hernández, F.X. (2006). Història de Catalunya. Barcelona: Rafael Dalmau
- Hernández, FX.; Comes, P. (1990): Barmi. A mediterranean city through the ages. Boston: Houghton Mifflin Company
- Hernández, F.X.; Comes, P. (1990): Geschiedenis van een stad bij de middellandse Zee. Tarma. Bloemendaal. Països Baixos: J.H. Gottmer-Haarlem
- Hernández, F.X.; Ballonga, J. (1991). A city of northern Europe through the ages. Lebek Boton: Houghton Mifflin Company
- Hernández, F.X.; Ballonga, J. (1991): En havneby i nordeuropa. Hambeck. Fra stenalderboplads til storby. Kobenhavn. Dinamarca: Host&Son
- Hernández, F.X.; Ballonga, J. (1992): Una citta del Centro America. San Rafael. Milano: Jaca Book
- Hernández, F.X. (Coord.) (1996): Catalunya. Història i memoria. Barcelona: Generalitat de Catalunya/Museu d'Història de Catalunya/Enciclopèdia Catalana/Proa
- Hernández, F.X. (2005). Renaissance fortifications in the Mediterranean: Eivissa. Eivissa: Ajuntament d'Eivissa
- Hernández, F.X. (Coord.); Besolí, A.; Gesalí, D.; Íñiguez, D.; Luque, J.C. (2005): Ebro 1938. Barcelona: Inèdita Editores
- Santacana, J.; Hernández, F.X. (2006). Museología crítica. Gijón: Ediciones Trea
- Hernández, F.X.; Riart, F. (2007). Els exèrcits de Catalunya, 1713-1714. Barcelona: Rafael Dalmau
- Hernández, F.X.; Íñiguez, D. (2008). La columna Macià-Companys. Barcelona: Institut d'Estudis Socioeconòmics/Fundació Josep Irla
- Hernández, F.X.; Rubio, X. (2009). Talamanca, 1714. Arqueologia d'una batalla. Calafell: Llibres de Matrícula
- Santacana, J.; Hernández, F. X.; Coma, L.; Martín, C. (2009). Obra oberta. Construint Barcelona. Barcelona: Angle Editorial
- Hernández, F.X. (2010). The history of Catalonia. Catalonia, history and memory. Barcelona: Museu d'Història de Catalunya
- Hernández, F.X.; Rubio, X. (2010). Breve historia de la guerra antigua y medieval. Madrid: Ediciones Nowtilus
- Arnabat, R.; Hernández, F.X. (2011). Estratègies de recerca i transferències del coneixement històric-arqueològic. El cas de l'aviació republicana, 1938-1939. Calafell: Llibres de Matrícula
- Feliu, M.; Hernández, F.X. (2011). 12 ideas clave. Enseñar y aprender historia. Barcelona: Editorial Graó
- Santacana, J.; Hernández, F. X. (2011). Museos de historia. Entre la taxidermia y el nomadismo. Gijón: Ediciones Trea
- Pongiluppi, G.H.; Hernández, F.X. (2012). 1714, El setge de Barcelona. Barcelona: Angle Editorial
- Hernández, F.X.; Rojo, M.C. (2012). Museografía didáctica e interpretación de espacios arqueológicos. Gijón: Ediciones Trea
- Feliu, M.; Hernández, F.X (2013). Didáctica de la Guerra Civil española. Barcelona: Editorial Graó
- Hernández, F.X.; Riart, F. (2014). Barcelona 1714. Jacques Rigaud crònica de tinta i pólvora. Barcelona: Librooks
- Riart, F.; Hernández, F.X. (2014). Soldats, guerrers i combatents dels Països Catalans. Barcelona: Rafael Dalmau Editor
- Casals, J.R.; Hernández, F.X.; Pongiluppi, G. (2014). Born 1714. Memòria de Barcelona. Barcelona: Angle Editorial
- Hernández, F.X.; Feliu, M. (Coords.) (2014). 1714 a l'aula. 100 propostes didàctiques (primària i secundària). Barcelona: Graó Editorial
