= Serra de Cavalls =

Mountain in Spain

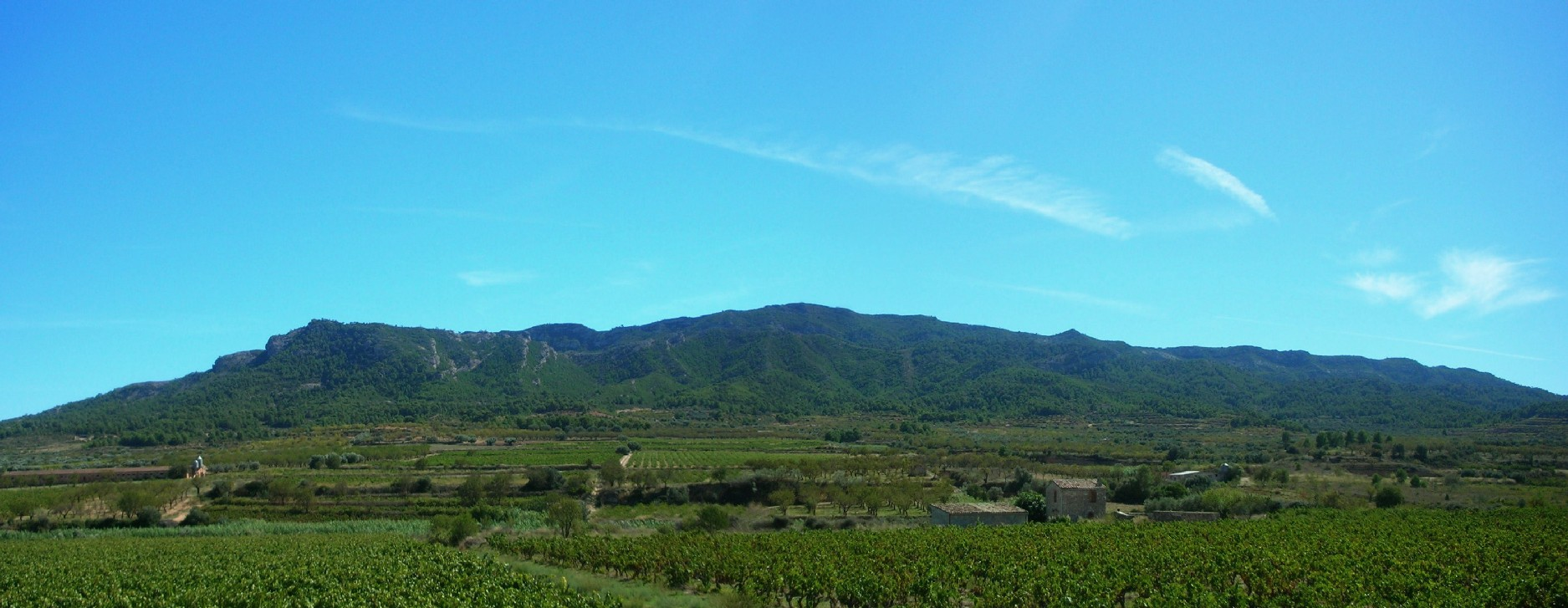
- Serra de Cavalls seen from Corbera d'Ebre

Highest point
- Elevation: 659 m (2,162 ft)
- Coordinates: 41°03′18.57″N 0°29′46.79″E

Geography
- Location: Terra Alta (Catalonia)
- Parent range: Catalan Pre-Coastal Range

Geology
- Mountain type: Limestone

Climbing
- Easiest route: Drive from Gandesa

Serra de Cavalls is a mountain chain located at the southern end of the Catalan Pre-Coastal Range, Catalonia, Spain. The ridge's highest point is Punta Redona (659.2 m). This mountain range lies within the Benissanet, Gandesa and El Pinell de Brai municipal term. On the northern side are two ridges of parallel foothills called Serra del Pebre and Serra de Santa Madrona. Its northern prolongation is known as Serra de la Vall de la Torre.

== Recent history ==
These mountains, along with Serra de Pàndols further south and Serra de la Fatarella in the north, were the scenario of bloody battles during the Battle of the Ebro in the Spanish Civil War (1936 - 39). The Ebro Battle was also the last action of the International Brigades, who were withdrawn midway through it. In nearby Serra de Pàndols stands a monument to those who died in the battles on Hill 705.

Currently there is a project to install wind turbines on the Serra de Pàndols and Serra de Cavalls which has met with public protests. There is also opposition to the attempt to locate a vast rubbish dump in an area that is very close to these mountains.

== See also ==
- Siege of Gandesa (1938)
- International Brigades
- Catalan Pre-Coastal Range

== Bibliography ==
- Jaume Aguadé i Sordé, El diari de guerra de Lluís Randé i Inglés; Batalles del Segre i de l’Ebre i camps de concentració (abril 1938 - juliol 1939), El Tinter ISBN 84-9791-082-6
