= Siege of Gandesa (1938) =

Coordinates: 41°3′N 0°26′E

- Part of the Spanish Civil War
Date	31 July – November 1938
Location	Gandesa, Catalonia, Spain
Result	Nationalist victory

Belligerents
Spanish Republic; International Brigades	Nationalist Spain (Kingdom of Italy) Aviazione Legionaria (Nazi Germany) Condor Legion

Commanders and leaders
Vicente Rojo; Juan Modesto; Manuel Tagüeña	Francisco Franco; Fidel Davila; Juan Yagüe; Rafael García Valiño

Strength
XV Corps; XV International Brigade	50th Division; Regulares; Spanish Legion; Falangists

Casualties and losses
High	High

The siege of Gandesa took place between July and November 1938 during the Spanish Civil War, a few months after a battle in the same town.

== History ==
The siege of Gandesa, or second battle of Gandesa, was part of an attempt by the Spanish Republican Army to recapture lost territory following the Battle of the Ebro, when six fully equipped republican divisions were able to successfully cross the Ebro River. The republican move initially caught the rebel faction by surprise, but the latter displayed greater logistic superiority and quickly brought in a convoy of troops from Lleida, including Regulares shock troops, the Spanish Legion and Falangists as reinforcements.

=== The siege ===
The attack against the Francoist troops entrenched in the town of Gandesa was mainly led by the 35th Division of the 15th Army Corps (XV Cuerpo del Ejército), led by Manuel Tagüeña Other divisions involved as the siege progressed were the 3d, 11th, 43d, 45th and 46th. Among the attackers the XV International Brigade, who had led the Battle of Gandesa a few months before, also took part in what would be its last battle in Spain.

After its initial success, the ambitious republican offensive failed and the front stabilized in a line from Serra de Pàndols in the west through Gandesa and neighbouring Vilalba dels Arcs, as far east as the Serra de Cavalls range and north to Serra de la Fatarella. Defended by the Nationalist 50th Division, the republican troops launched repeated attacks against Gandesa town, the wall of the local graveyard bearing the brunt of much of the combat action.

Disregarding the advice of fellow generals García Valiño and Yagüe and Aranda who preferred to hold the front as it was and initiate an offensive in the North towards Barcelona, Franco wanted to regain the lost territory at any price. His plan was to keep ramming against the republican lines with repeated frontal counterattacks despite the heavy number of casualties on his own side. General Aranda compared the lack of progress at Gandesa to a fruitless fight of two rams, but Franco concentrated on the fact that he had the best of the Republican Army caught up in a 35 km long line and if he annihilated it, there would be not enough manpower on the side of the Spanish Republic to continue the war.

After months of confrontation, on 2 November the nationalists dominated all the high points of the Pàndols and Cavalls ranges and by 10 November all republican positions south of the Ebro were abandoned in a hasty retreat. There were a very high number of casualties on both sides; the Nationalist armies could bear them, but the Republican military would not recover from the heavy losses inflicted.

== See also ==
- Si me quieres escribir
- List of Spanish Nationalist military equipment of the Spanish Civil War
- List of Spanish Republican military equipment of the Spanish Civil War
