= El Pinell de Brai =

- Municipality
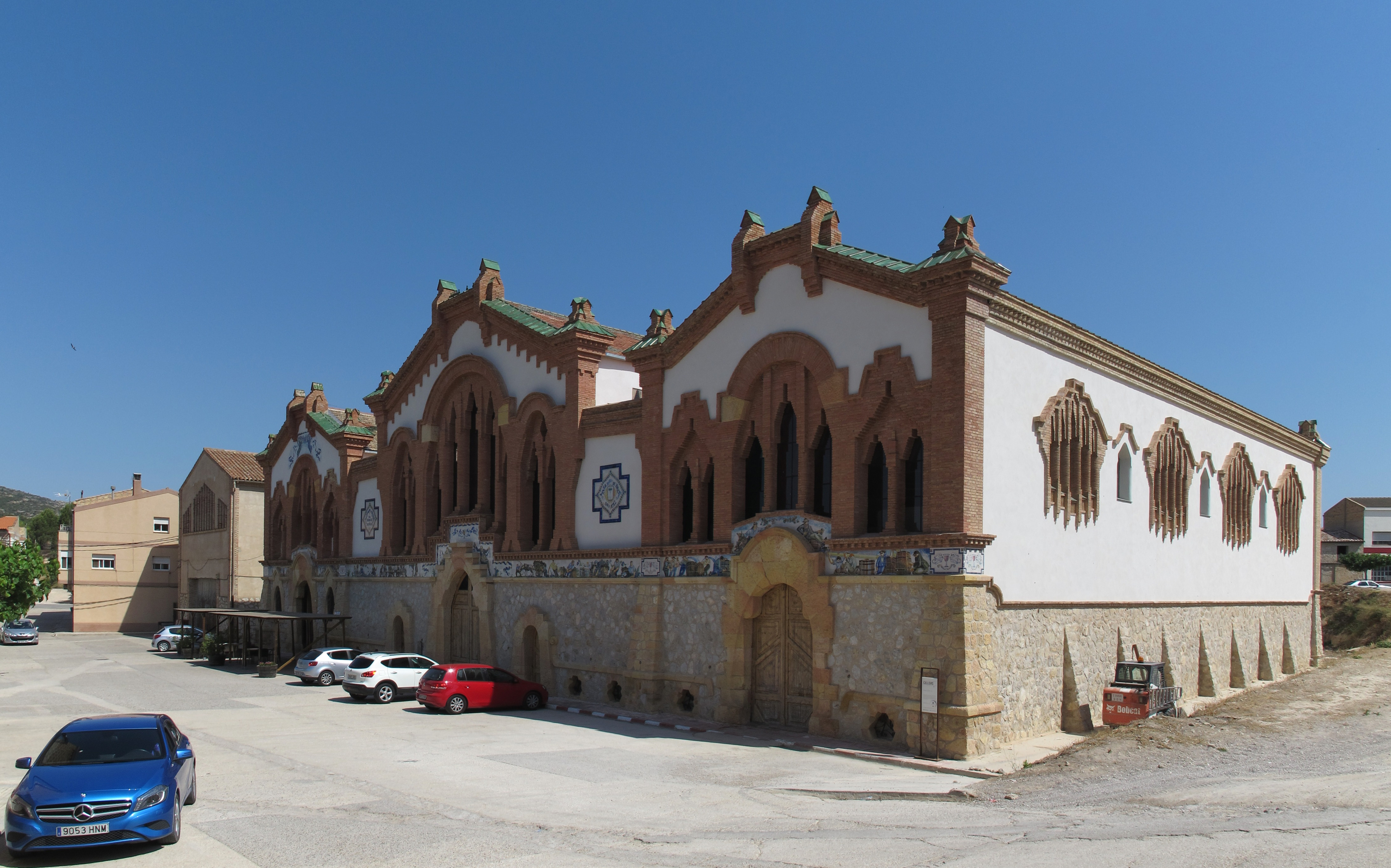
- Cooperative building, El Pinell de Brai

- Flag Coat of arms

- Location in Catalonia
- Coordinates: 41°01′02″N 0°30′56″E
- Country: Spain
- Community: Catalonia
- Province: Tarragona
- Comarca: Terra Alta

Government
  - mayor: Laura Vallespí Martí (2023)

Area
  - Total: 57.0 km^{2} (22.0 sq mi)
- Elevation: 101 m (331 ft)

Population (2025-01-01)
  - Total: 948
  - Density: 16.6/km^{2} (43.1/sq mi)
- Postal code: 43106
- Climate: Csa
- Website: www.pinelldebrai.altanet.org

El Pinell de Brai (Catalan pronunciation: [lo piˈneʎ ðe ˈβɾaj]) is a municipality in the comarca of la Terra Alta in Catalonia, Spain. It has a population of 948 (register office, 2025).

This town is located in a small plain surrounded by mountains including Serra de Pàndols and Serra de Cavalls. This area suffered badly during the Battle of the Ebro in the Spanish Civil War (1936–39). There is a point called Hill 705 Cota 705 on top of the highest peak of Serra de Pàndols range near the town on which stands a monument to those who died in the battles. Like in Corbera d'Ebre, some of the town's houses destroyed in the Civil War have been kept as they are and are known as "The Fallen Houses" Les Cases Caigudes.
