= First phase of the War of the Sicilian Vespers =

Military conflict (1282–1302)

First phase
- Part of the War of the Sicilian Vespers
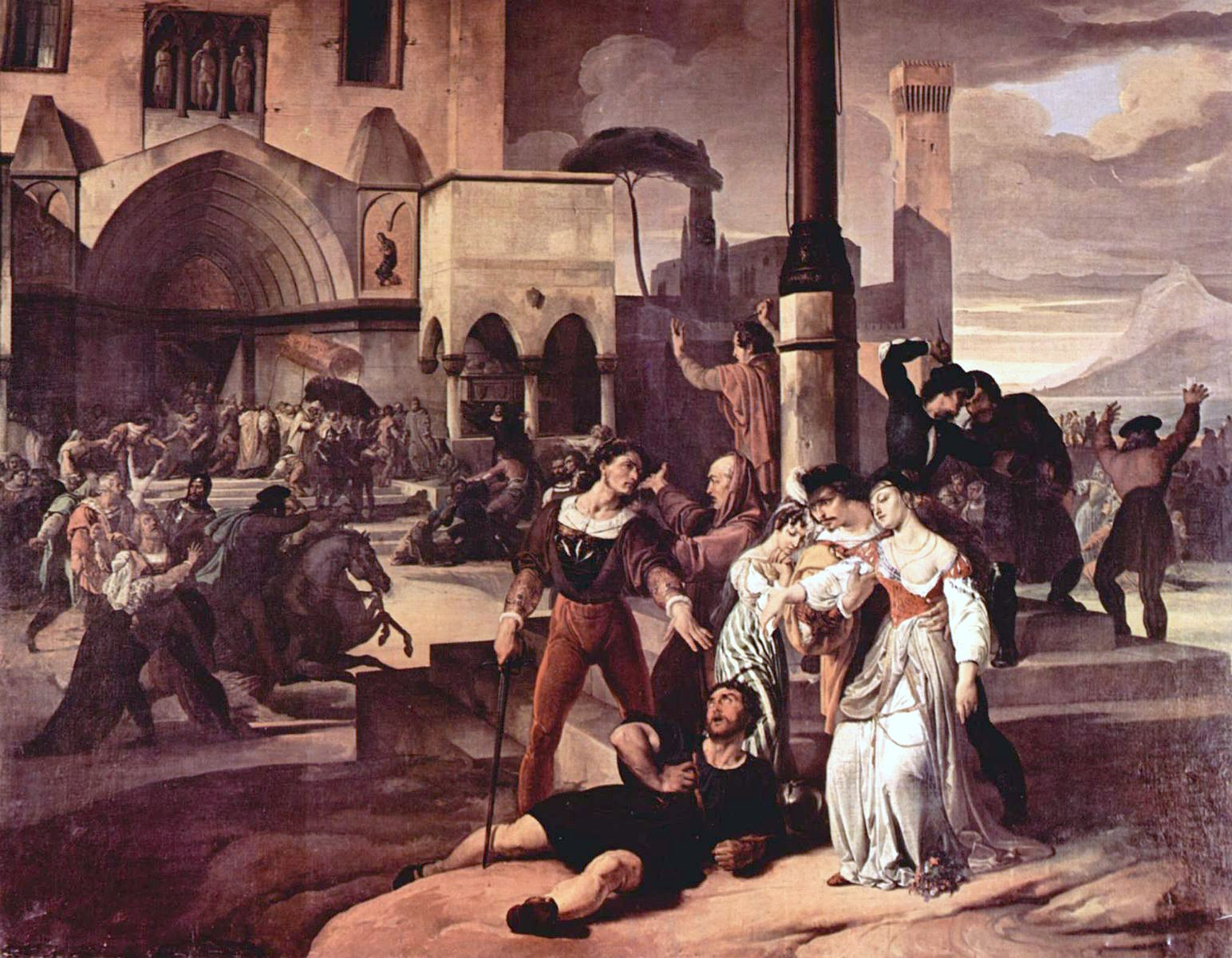
- A scene of the Sicilian Vesper by Francesco Hayez
Date	1282–1294
Location	Aragon, and Catalonia
Result	Aragon victory

Belligerents
Crown of Aragon; Kingdom of Sicily	Kingdom of Naples; Kingdom of France; Papal States

Commanders and leaders
(Crown of Aragon) Peter III of Aragon	Charles of Anjou; Charles II of Naples; Robert II of Artois (Kingdom of France) Charles I

The War of the Sicilian Vespers was a protracted conflict for control of the Kingdom of Sicily and naval dominance in the Mediterranean, spanning from 1282 to 1302. This article focuses on the initial phase of the war (1282–1294), fought between the Crown of Aragon and the House of Anjou, which held power in Naples and France.

== Background ==
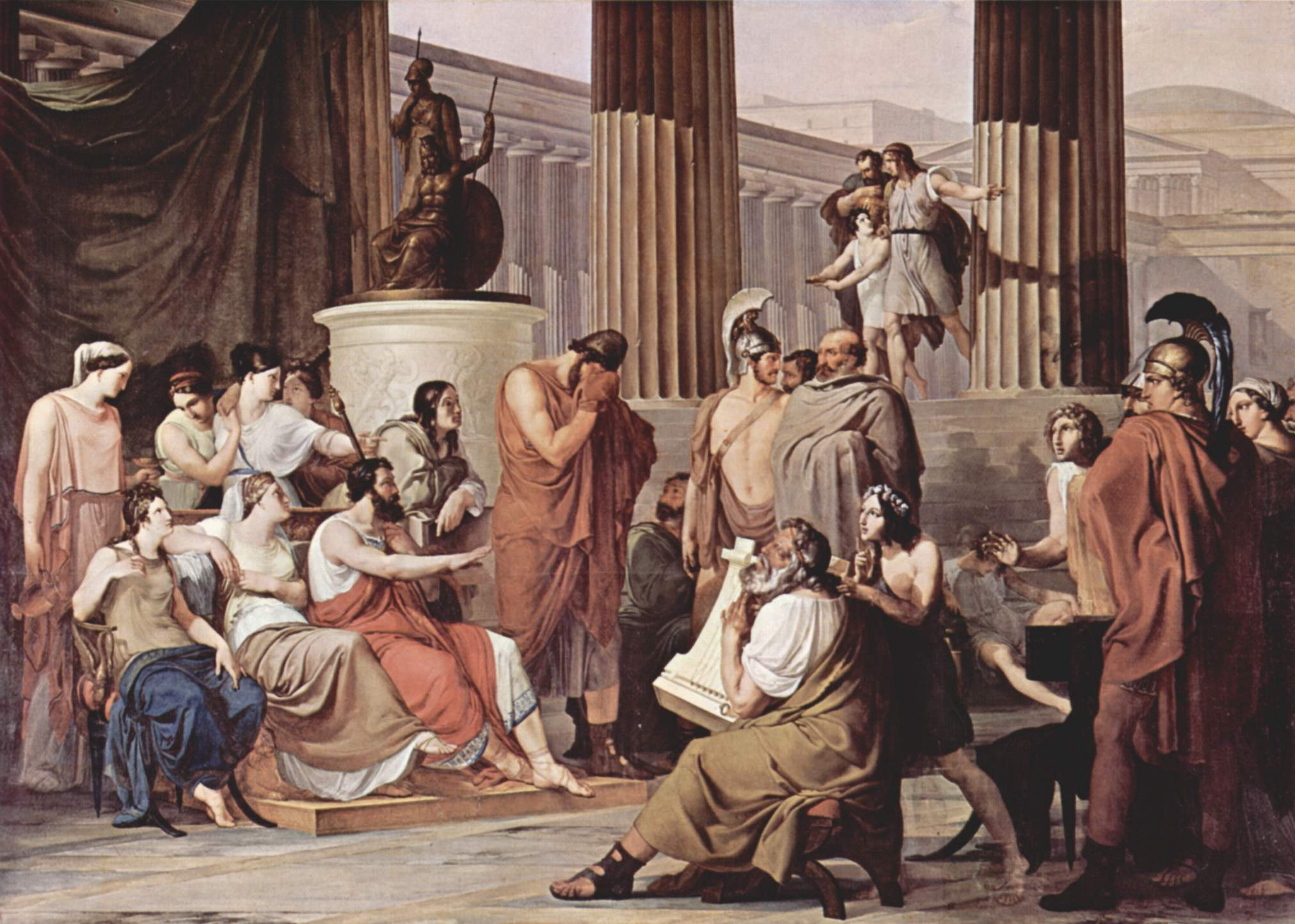
"The Sicilian Vespers"

When Manfred I of Sicily ascended to the throne of the Kingdom of Sicily, Pope Clement IV excommunicated him. This action effectively made the kingdom a fiefdom of the Papacy. In 1262, Constança de Sicilia, Manfred's daughter, married Pere the Great, the Count of Barcelona and King of Aragon. This union between the Hohenstaufen dynasty and the House of Barcelona provoked the antipathy of the French Pope Clement IV, who sought assistance from Charles I of Anjou, the younger brother of his ally, Louis IX of France.

Charles of Anjou's troops invaded the island and defeated Manfred I at the Battle of Benevento. Charles was subsequently crowned King of Sicily in Rome in 1266. He established his authority by force following the Ghibelline revolt led by Conrad of Sicily in 1268. Seeking supremacy in the Mediterranean, he allied himself with the dethroned Baldwin II of the Latin Empire against Michael VIII Paleologus. In 1271, he conquered part of Morea and crowned himself King of Albania. In 1277, he purchased the rights to the title of King of Jerusalem from Maria of Antioch. With the support of the Republic of Venice, he prepared a crusade to reconquer Constantinople in 1282.

Under the rule of Charles of Anjou, and later his son Charles II, the north was favored over the south, leading to the relocation of the capital from Palermo to Naples.

== The Sicilian Vespers ==
The revolt, incited by Joan of Pròixida, is named for beginning at the start of the Vespers prayer on Easter Monday, March 30, 1282, in the Church of Santo Spirito (Holy Spirit) in Palermo. Through that night and into the following day (March 31), two thousand French and Guelph Sicilians were massacred, with many more casualties over the following six weeks. The estimated total death toll reached four thousand people.

== Campaign of 1282–1284 ==
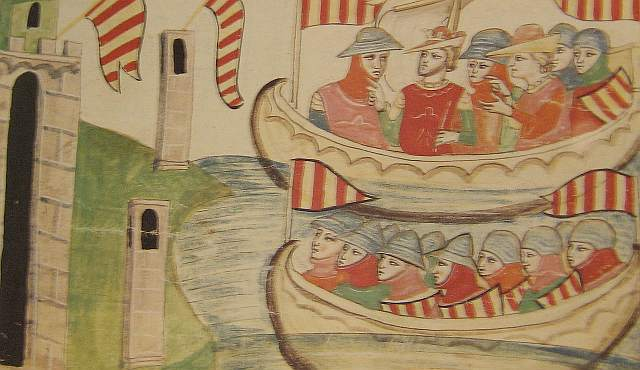
Speedy landing of Peter III at Trapani. The king can be identified wearing the crown

Peter III, with 60,000 gold coins from Emperor Michael VIII Paleologus, 200,000 salaries from Jewish contributions, and taxes from the mosques, entered Sicily via Trapani on August 30. He raised Messina, entered Palermo on September 4, and a few days later destroyed the Angevin fleet of Charles I of Valois in the Battle of Nicotera.

In 1282, the Kingdom of Sicily was divided into the "Kingdom of Sicily, peninsular" or Kingdom of Naples, under Angevin rule, and the "Kingdom of Sicily, insular", under Aragonese rule. This incident sparked the War of Sicily and, given the political strength of the Pope, led to the Crusade against the Crown of Aragon.

Garrisons were established in Reggio and Seminara, in Calabria. After the victory in the Battle of Malta, Roger de Llúria conquered the islands of Malta and Gozo. Using his own and captured galleys he provoked the Angevins by attacking the Calabrian coast, Naples, and Posillipo. In the absence of Charles I of Anjou, the Prince of Salerno assembled a fleet and went to meet him. On June 5, 1284, after initial contact, Roger feigned a retreat towards Castellammare but stopped short to initiate combat in the middle of the Gulf of Naples. The Catalan fleet, armed with soldiers accustomed to combat and more skilled in naval maneuvers than the French courtiers and knights, stormed the enemy galleys. Fierce fighting took place on the Capua galley, commanded by Charles of Salerno, until Roger de Llúria rammed it, causing it to sink, and the French surrendered.

== The Crusade against the Crown of Aragon ==
Felipe l'Ardit, with a significant army, concentrated in Narbonne to head towards Barcelona, where a revolt of the artisans took place. The revolt was suppressed with the death of Berenguer Oller and seven other rebels, who were hanged and dragged through the city. Once peace was restored, Peter III went to Rosselló to ensure the defense against the invasion, which his brother Jaume II de Mallorca had joined.

With Jaume II aligning with the Crusaders, the line of defense had to be prepared with the Empordanese troops at the Coll de Panissars, avoiding battle in the open field where the crusader cavalry would have an advantage. Dalmau VI de Rocabertí settled in El Pertús and Ponç V d'Empúries dominated Banyuls de la Marenda and the Coll de la Massana. Meanwhile, the Infant Alfons was preparing a fleet of galleys to defend the coasts, which would be commanded by the admirals Ramon Marquet and Berenguer Mallol. Roger de Llúria was ordered to return from Sicily. He called the hosts of Barcelona, Lleida, Tarragona, and Tortosa, and asked for the support of the Order of the Temple and the Order of the Hospital, which would gather in April in Figueres.

In 1285, the French entered through Roussillon, but the population of Roussillon resisted. The resistance concluded with the Siege of Elna, which was burned, causing a massacre. The Crusaders finally camped in Elna and Perpignan, while the Catalans, stationed at the Coll de Panissars, prevented the Crusaders from entering the south of Catalonia. They crossed the Pyrenees through La Massana in June, while the fleet anchored in Roses. The Catalans retreated to Peralada, from where they would withdraw after a battle in the open field. However, Infant Alfons, the commander of the army, ordered the evacuation in the direction of Girona, applying the scorched earth policy, and leaving troops in the castles on the way to Barcelona.

The French entered Castelló d'Empúries and days later besieged Girona, which was commanded by Ramon Folc VI de Cardona. From June 27 to September 10, they suffered the terrible effects of hunger and disease, while the Crusaders occupied Figueres, Roses, Sant Feliu de Guíxols, and Blanes. Peter III left Barcelona at the beginning of August at the head of an army of 500 cavalry and 5,000 infantry to attack the army that besieged Girona lifted the siege. He first went to the Monastery of Montserrat, where he received a blessing, and then went to Hostalric, where he held a council and decided to camp near Girona.

The defense of the Catalan coast, while the Catalan fleet, commanded by Roger de Llúria, was in Sicily, was supported by a fleet of eleven galleys from the admirals' fleets. They defeated the Crusaders in the Battle of Sant Feliu de Guíxols in front of the Isles Formigues between Roses and Sant Feliu. For the second time, already reunited with Roger de Llúria's fleet, they won the naval Battle of the Ants in front of Calella de Palafrugell on August 27, Roses on September 3, and against Cadaqués on September 4. Due to this naval defeat, the Catalans recovered the territory in the north, dominated the coast, and cut supply lines.

The Viscount of Cardona agreed with Roger Bernat III de Foix on a twenty-day truce from August 19, promising to hand over the city if after this time the king did not send Girona the aid he had promised them. On September 7, the city surrendered to the besiegers and was occupied by Eustaqui de Beaumarchais, who left a garrison in the city, retreating with the rest of the army to the Empordà.

The plague spread among the French, who had to withdraw from the Empordà and evacuate Girona on September 7 due to the illness. However, they found their retreat cut off by Besalú, the Coll de Panissars, and the Coll de La Massana. But since many soldiers were sick, the Catalans agreed not to attack them and let them pass through Agullana. A part of the French army also wanted to cross the Coll de Panissars, whose defenders did not know the order to leave a clear path, and the French were annihilated there between September 30 and October 1 in the battle of the Panissars pass. King Philippe III of France, who accompanied his son Charles of Valois, was able to reach Perpignan where he died on October 5. The French maintained the occupation of the Aran Valley.

=== Confiscation of the Kingdom of Mallorca ===
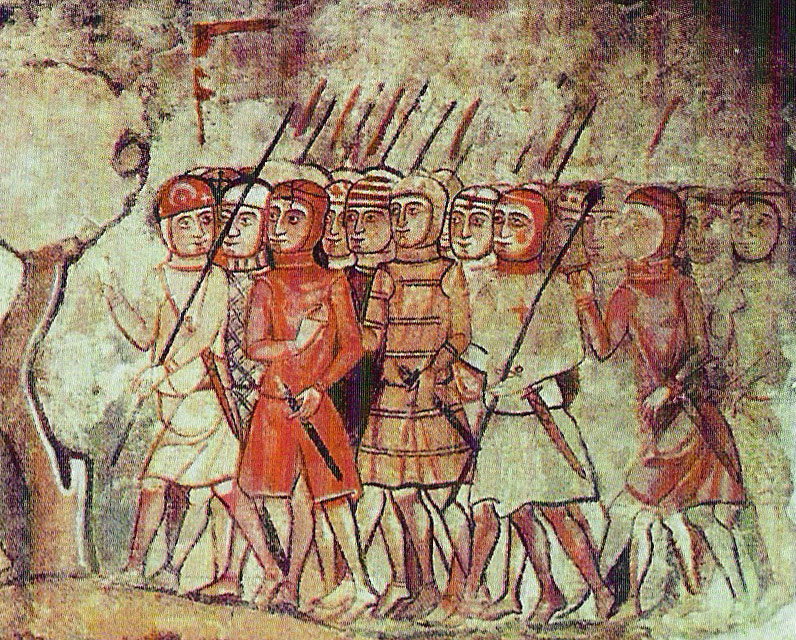
In the Battle of the Col de Panissars

Peter III sent a fleet against his brother, James II of Majorca, who was in Perpignan. He ultimately confiscated the Balearic Islands after the island's surrender without a fight. Ponç Saguàrdia, the lieutenant of James II, surrendered Mallorca to Alfons el Franc. The trustees of the towns of Mallorca swore homage to the king, except for the Castell d'Alaró. Here, the resistance was led by the warden, Ramon Ballester, and the garrison formed by Guillem Capello "Cabrit", Guillem Bassa, Arnau Ramon, Lleonard Marsello, and Albert Perpinyà. They all died in the assault. However, the king would not see the results of the expedition as he died a few days later in Vilafranca.

James II retained all his territories except the Balearic Islands. These were returned to him in 1295 through the Treaty of Anagni, under the same conditions agreed upon in the Treaty of Perpignan in 1279.

=== Attack on Occitania ===
In retaliation, Roger de Llúria led a punitive expedition to Languedoc in February 1286. He arrived with a fleet of galleys, a hundred knights, and two thousand almogàvers at the beaches of Valras, which were subsequently looted and burned. They then ascended the Orb River on foot until they reached Serinhan.

The French of Béziers, alerted to the Catalans' actions, assembled an army of thirty thousand men, including three hundred knights, to confront them. The Catalan crossbowmen greeted this force with a barrage of fire. Despite being outnumbered, the Almogavers launched an attack that caused the French to scatter. The French were pursued until they were approximately two kilometers from Béziers. Roger de Llúria then ordered a retreat to Valras Beach, where the galleys were docked. On their way, they looted and burned the city of Serinhan, including its castle, sparing only the Church of the Mother of God of Grace. Roger de Llúria had no intention of attacking Béziers, but he did assault Agde before heading to Aigües Mortes and returning to Barcelona with substantial loot.

== Campaign of 1287–1289 ==
Pope Honorius IV urged the Angevins to continue their assault on Sicily, amassing 40 galleys at Brindisi and an additional 43 at Sorrento. In April 1287, the Brindisi fleet, under the command of Reynald III Quarrel, Count of Avella, landed in Augusta on May 1, seizing the town and castle. Upon hearing the news, James II (of Aragon) dispatched the fleet of Roger de Llúria. However, the Angevin fleet had already set off for Sorrento, skirting the island to the south, and joined the rest of the fleet in a maneuver designed to distract the Crown of Aragon's fleet.

Roger de Llúria's fleet sought the fleet that had slipped away from Augusta and located it in Naples on June 23, 1287. However, due to its proximity to the city, they could not launch an attack and instead began a blockade to draw out the Angevins. The Angevin fleet was composed of five squadrons, each led by Reynald III Quarrel, Hug de Brienne, the Count of l'Aquila, Jean de Joinville, and Guy de Montfort. Each squadron had its flagship galley, flanked by four galleys on each side and two at the rear, with the admiral's flagship leading two more. The remaining galleys were held in reserve, and two ships escorted the papal and Angevin standards.

Roger de Llúria commanded the forty galleys that had followed the fleet from Sicily. He employed a tactic of retreating until the enemy fleet was dispersed, then counterattacking from the flanks by targeting the oars. The battle continued all day until Enric de Mari managed to escape. The Catalans captured 40 galleys and took 5,000 prisoners.

== Aftermath ==
Charles II of Anjou was released under the treaties of Oloron and Canfranc. He was crowned at Rieti on May 29, 1289, and received the title of Charles of Palermo and King of Sicily from the Pope. Additionally, a two-year truce was signed.

The death of Alfonso III in 1291 led to a significant conflict between the Crown of Aragon and the Kingdom of Sicily four years later. This was because James II was proclaimed King of the Crown of Aragon and delegated the Kingdom of Sicily to his younger brother.

== Sources ==
- Francesc Xavier Hernández Cardona (2004). Military History of Catalonia. Flight. 2. Rafael Dalmau. ISBN 84-232-0655-6.
- Steven Runciman, The Sicilian Vespers: A History of the Mediterranean World in the Later Thirteenth Century ISBN 978-0-521-43774-5
- H.J Chaytor. A History of Aragon and Catalonia
- Jerónimo Zurita: Anales de Aragón
- Michele Amari, "History of the war of the Sicilian vespers". Earl of Ellesmere. London 1850
