= Battle of Gandesa =

1938 Spanish Civil War battle

Coordinates: 41°3′N 0°26′E

- Part of the Spanish Civil War
Date	1–3 April 1938
Location	Gandesa, Catalonia, Spain
Result	Nationalist victory

Belligerents
Spanish Republic; International Brigades	Nationalist Spain (Kingdom of Italy) Corpo Truppe Volontarie; Aviazione Legionaria (Nazi Germany) Condor Legion

Commanders and leaders
Robert Hale Merriman †	(Francoist Spain) Unknown

Units involved
XV International Brigade	Corpo Truppe Volontarie; Aviazione Legionaria; Condor Legion

Casualties and losses
140 prisoners	Unknown

The Battle of Gandesa took place in April 1938 during the Spanish Civil War.

== Background ==
After the fall of Caspe, the Nationalists troops continued their advance towards Catalonia with the support of the Legion Condor and the Aviazione Legionaria. By the end of February the nationalists had reached the outskirts of Gandesa. The XV International Brigade had been retreating since the Aragón Offensive began, and the republican lines collapsed.

The battle followed the decision of the XV International Brigade to dig in and hold the town of Gandesa in an effort to slow down the Francoist troops, which had been advancing steadily since the beginning of the offensive.

== Battle ==
The town of Gandesa was held by the XV International Brigade. The Nationalists attacked with troops of Mario Berti's CTV and Monasterio's Army Corps. Despite the prowess of the British troops, Gandesa fell on 3 April and 140 British and American members of the International Brigades were captured. However, the resistance of the XV Brigade allowed the Republican troops to regroup and to withdraw some material across the Ebro River.

== Cultural references ==
This battle is mentioned in the song Jamie Foyers, where the fictional hero is killed.

== See also ==
- List of Spanish Nationalist military equipment of the Spanish Civil War
- List of weapons of the Corpo Truppe Volontarie
- Aviazione Legionaria
- Condor Legion
- List of Spanish Republican military equipment of the Spanish Civil War
