= Coll de Balaguer =

Mountain pass in Catalonia, Spain

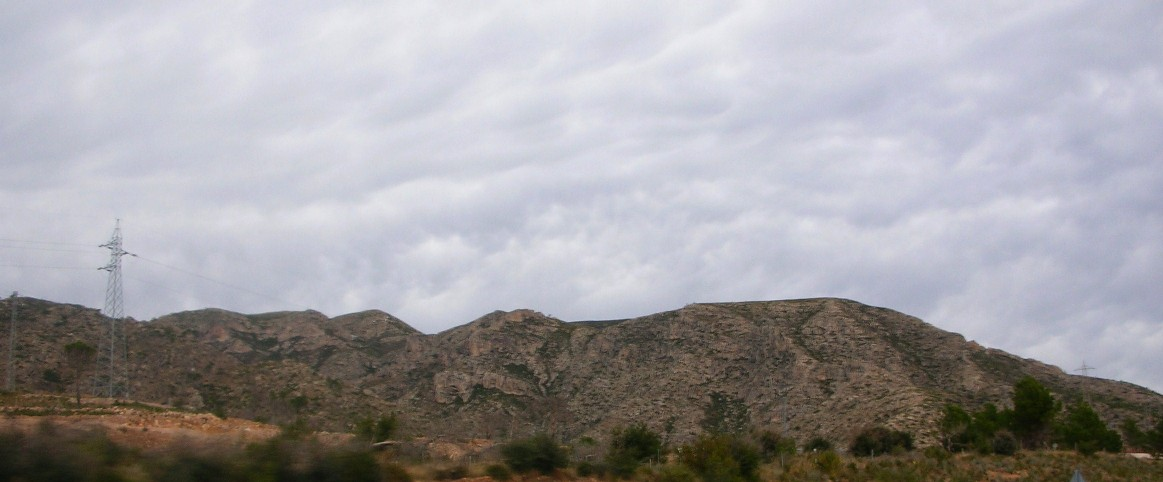
- View of Los Dedalts mountains in the Coll de Balaguer area.

- Location within Spain
- Elevation: 121 m (397 ft)

Third Approach
- Location: Vandellòs i l'Hospitalet de l'Infant, Catalonia
- Range: Catalan Pre-Coastal Range
- Coordinates: 40°57′58″N 0°53′8″E

The Coll de Balaguer is a mountain pass in Catalonia, Spain. It is located at the point where the Catalan Pre-Coastal Range reaches the sea, in L'Almadrava, within the Vandellòs i l'Hospitalet de l'Infant municipality, Baix Camp.

Despite its scant altitude this pass has been an important communication line between the Terres de l'Ebre region and the Camp de Tarragona since ancient times. Nowadays highways AP-7, N-340, as well as the Renfe Barcelona-Valencia railway line go through the Coll de Balaguer pass.

There are the ruins of a 13th-century castle overlooking the pass from the time of the fight against the Saracens. The Vandellòs Nuclear Power Plant is located right south of Coll de Balaguer.

== See also ==
- Catalan Pre-Coastal Range
