= Serra de la Fatarella =

Mountain range in Spain

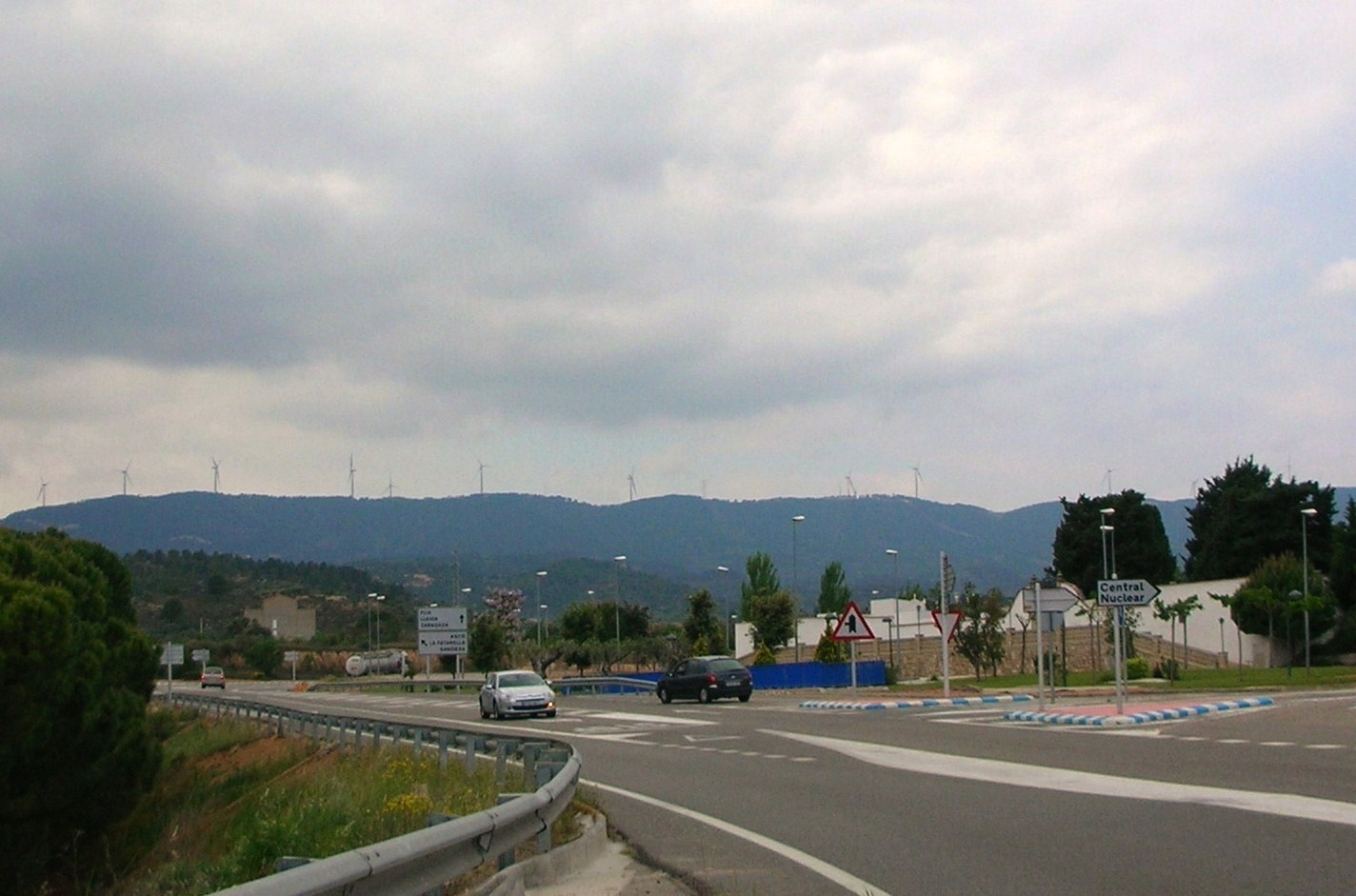
- Serra de la Fatarella range rising west of Ascó

Highest point
- Elevation: 563.5 m (1,849 ft)
- Coordinates: 41°11′49.34″N 0°29′42.86″E

Geography
- Location: Ribera d'Ebre & Terra Alta (Catalonia)
- Parent range: Catalan Central Depression

Geology
- Orogeny: Alpine orogeny
- Rock type: Limestone

Climbing
- Easiest route: Drive from La Fatarella

Serra de la Fatarella is one of the isolated mountain ranges of the Catalan Central Depression located off the southern end of the Catalan Pre-Coastal Range between La Fatarella and Ascó in Spain. The ridge's highest point is 563.5 m; another important summit is 552 m high Punta de l'Home. This smooth range runs in a N - S direction.

The 18th century renaissance style Ermita de la Misericòrdia is located on a 526 m high summit of the range. It has been reconstructed recently.

== History ==
These mountains, along with Serra de Pàndols further west and Serra de Cavalls in the south, were the scenario of bloody battles during the Battle of the Ebro in the Spanish Civil War (1936–39). The Ebro Battle was also the last action of the International Brigades, who were withdrawn midway through it.

Wind turbines have been built on top of the Serra de la Fatarella ridge.

== See also ==
- Catalan Central Depression
