= Picorandan =

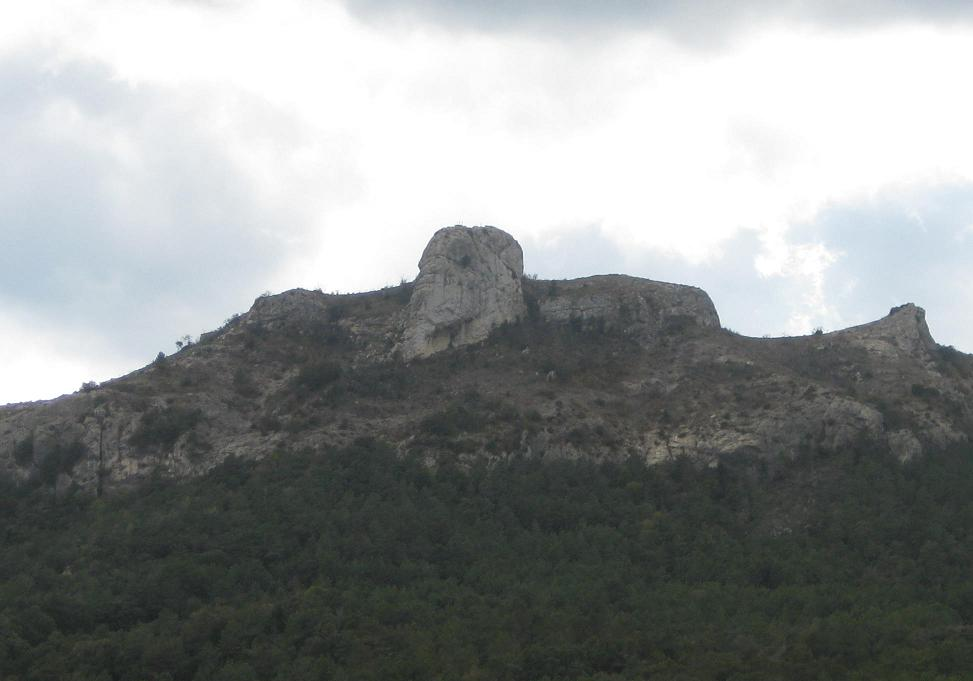

Highest point
- Elevation: 991 m (3,251 ft)
- Listing: Mountains in Catalonia
- Coordinates: 41°17′16.5″N 01°01′01.8″E

Geography
- Location within Catalonia
- Location: Baix Camp, Catalonia
- Parent range: Serra Plana

Climbing
- Easiest route: From Capafonts

Picorandan is a mountain of Catalonia, Spain. It is part of the Catalan Pre-Coastal Range. Its maximum elevation is 991 metres above sea level.

== See also ==
- Catalan Pre-Coastal Range.
