= Jaume Ferran i Clua =

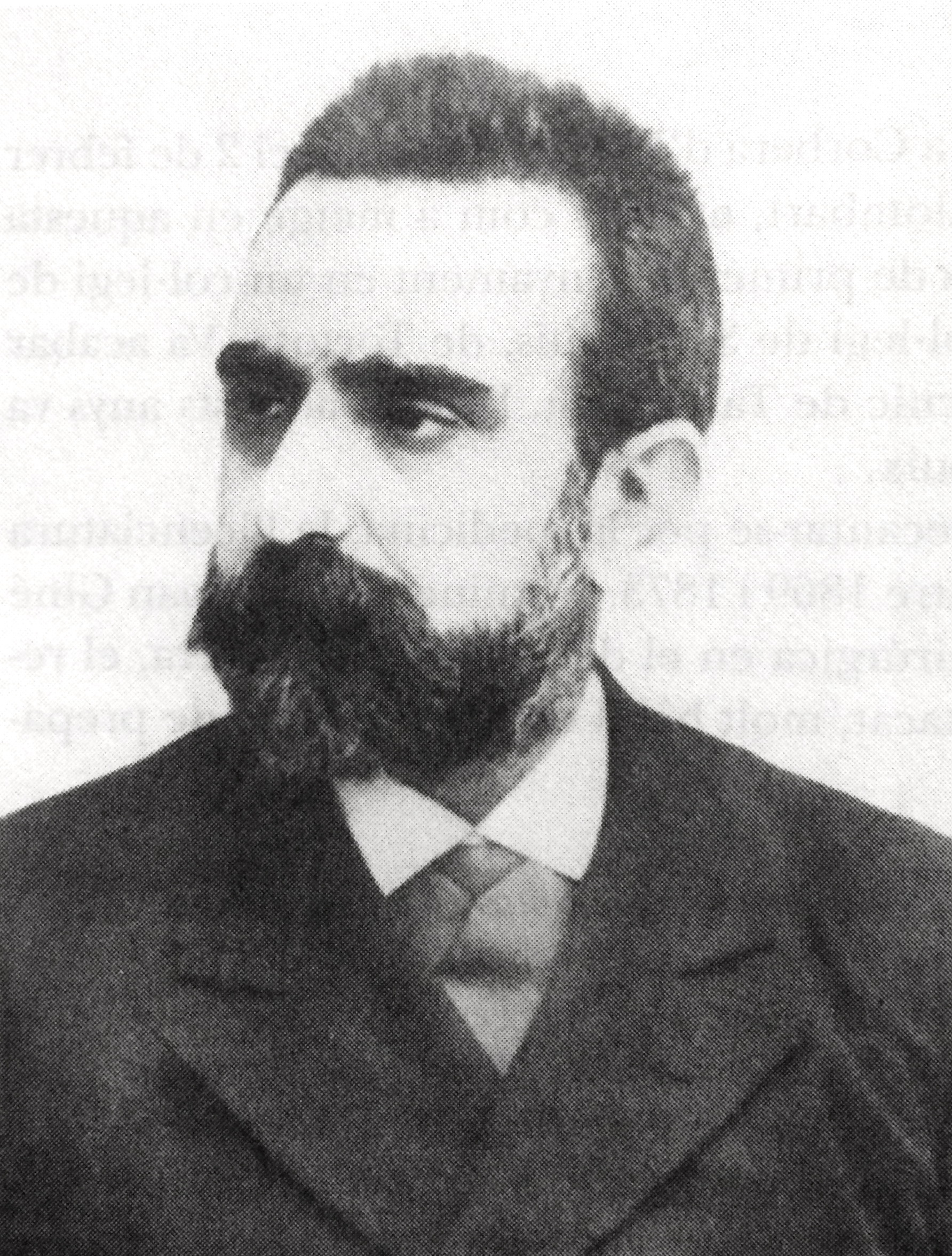
- Born: 1 February 1851; Corbera d'Ebre (Tarragona), Spain
- Died: 22 November 1929 (aged 78); Barcelona, Spain
- Resting place: Montjuïc Cemetery
- Occupation: Bacteriologist

Jaume Ferran i Clua (Corbera d'Ebre, 1851 – Barcelona 1929) was a Spanish-French bacteriologist and sanitarian, contemporary of Robert Koch, and said by his fellows to have made some of the discoveries attributed to Koch. As early as 1885, he wrote on immunization against cholera. In 1893, his work on this subject was translated into French with the title L'Inoculation préventive contre le Cholera.

Tuberculosis is another disease in which Ferran was always deeply interested. Some of his ideas on the transmission and virulence of tuberculosis are revolutionary.

He died in 1929 and was buried in Montjuïc Cemetery, Barcelona.

== Bibliography ==
- U. TRUJILLANO, Ferrán, su obra sanitaria, Madrid 1945;
- G. MARAÑÓN, La pasión sobre Ferrán, en La medicina y los médicos, Madrid 1962, 270–272;
- P. CAUS SEVILLA, El cólera de 1885 en Valencia y la vacunación Ferrán, en Medicina y Sociedad en la España del s. XIX, Madrid 1964, 285–486.
- Ferran, J (1885). "Nota sobre la profilaxis del cólera por medio de inyecciones hipodérmicas de cultivo puro del bacilo virgula". El Siglo Med (in Spanish). 32: 480.
- FERNÁNDEZ SANZ, Juan José "1885: El año de la vacunación Ferrán. Trasfondo político, médico, socio-demográfico y económico de una epidemia". Fundación Ramón Areces. Madrid. 1990.
