= La Fatarella =

- Municipality
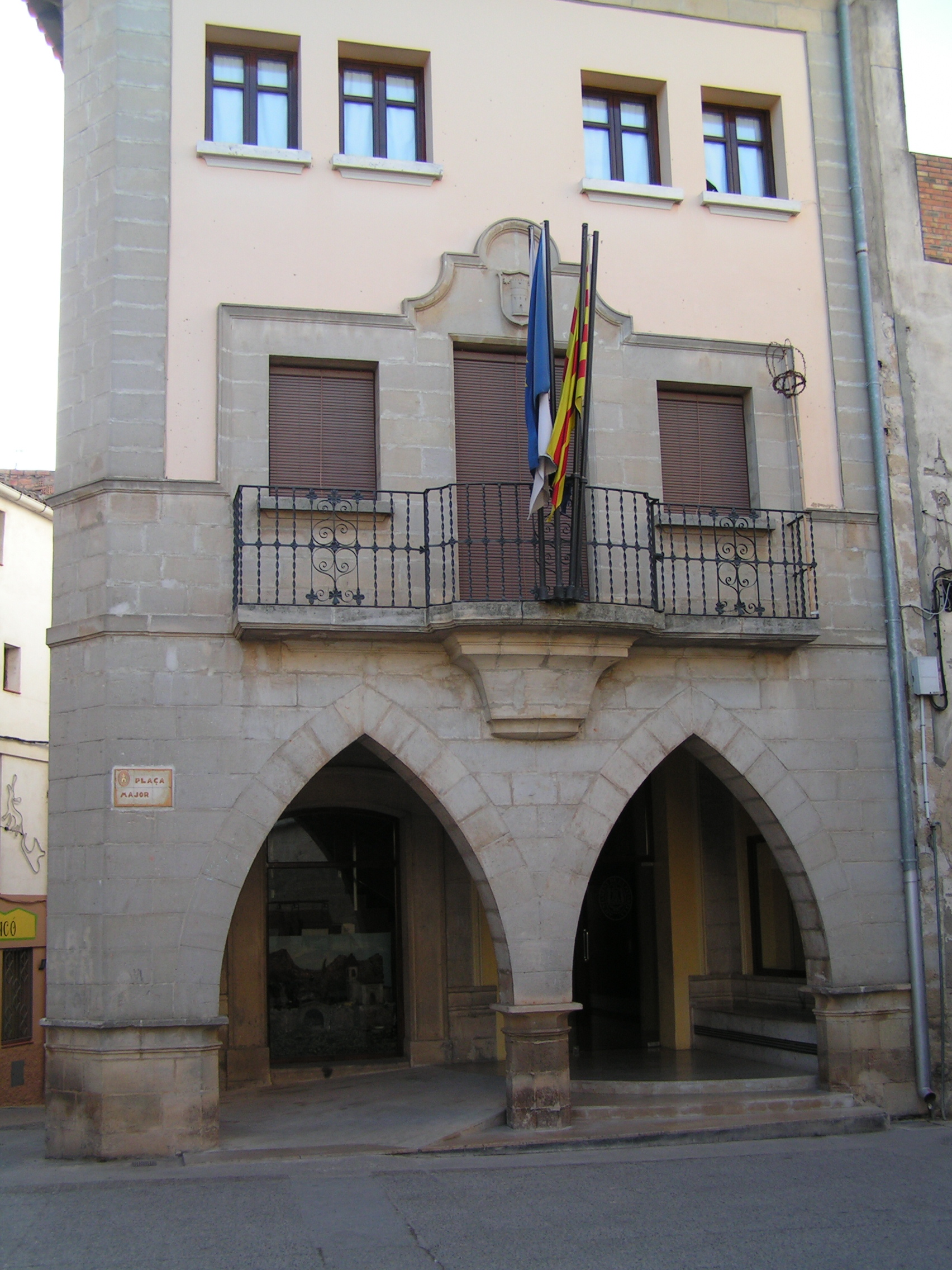
- La Fatarella town hall

- Location in the Province of Tarragona Location in Catalonia Location in Spain
- Coordinates: 41°9′50″N 0°28′30″E
- Country: Spain
- Community: Catalonia
- Province: Tarragona
- Comarca: Terra Alta

Government
  - Mayor: Francisco Blanch Batiste (2015)

Area
  - Total: 56.5 km^{2} (21.8 sq mi)

Population (2025-01-01)
  - Total: 840
  - Density: 15/km^{2} (39/sq mi)
- Climate: Csa
- Website: www.lafatarella.cat

La Fatarella (Catalan pronunciation: [la fataˈɾeʎa]) is a municipality in northern Terra Alta, within the region of Ribera d'Ebre in Spain. It has a population of 840 (register office, 2025).

== History ==
One of the oldest buildings in La Fatarella was a Muslim watchtower in the site where the chapel of Mare de Déu of the Misericòrdia stands today. The name of the population is derived from the Arab name for "tower", although there are other etymological theories. They are no visible remains of the tower. From the point where it stood there is a commanding view of the Terra Alta and a magnificent panoramic view.

The Fatarella has irregular and winding streets that present an architectonic element locally known as perxes, which are sections of a street being covered by envigats, or stone arcs, that unite several houses. The origins of the Fatarella present town is medieval, as the facades of many houses show, having porticoes of stone with thresholds carved with different symbols and inscriptions.

During the Middle Ages the town was walled to offer protection for its inhabitants, mainly from brigands and wolves. The walls are between 80–120 centimetres (31–47 in) in width. This defensive system continued until well into the 17th century, when the a population boom forced the city to expand beyond the walls. Nowadays, vestiges of these walls can still be seen, from which access doors on the enclosure can be deduced.

La Fatarella, especially neighboring Serra de la Fatarella mountain range, was one of the main locations of the Battle of the Ebro in the Spanish Civil War. A monument to commemorate the victims was erected in 2010.
