= Catalan Pre-Coastal Range =

System of mountain ranges in Catalonia

Coordinates: 41°36′55″N 1°47′16″E

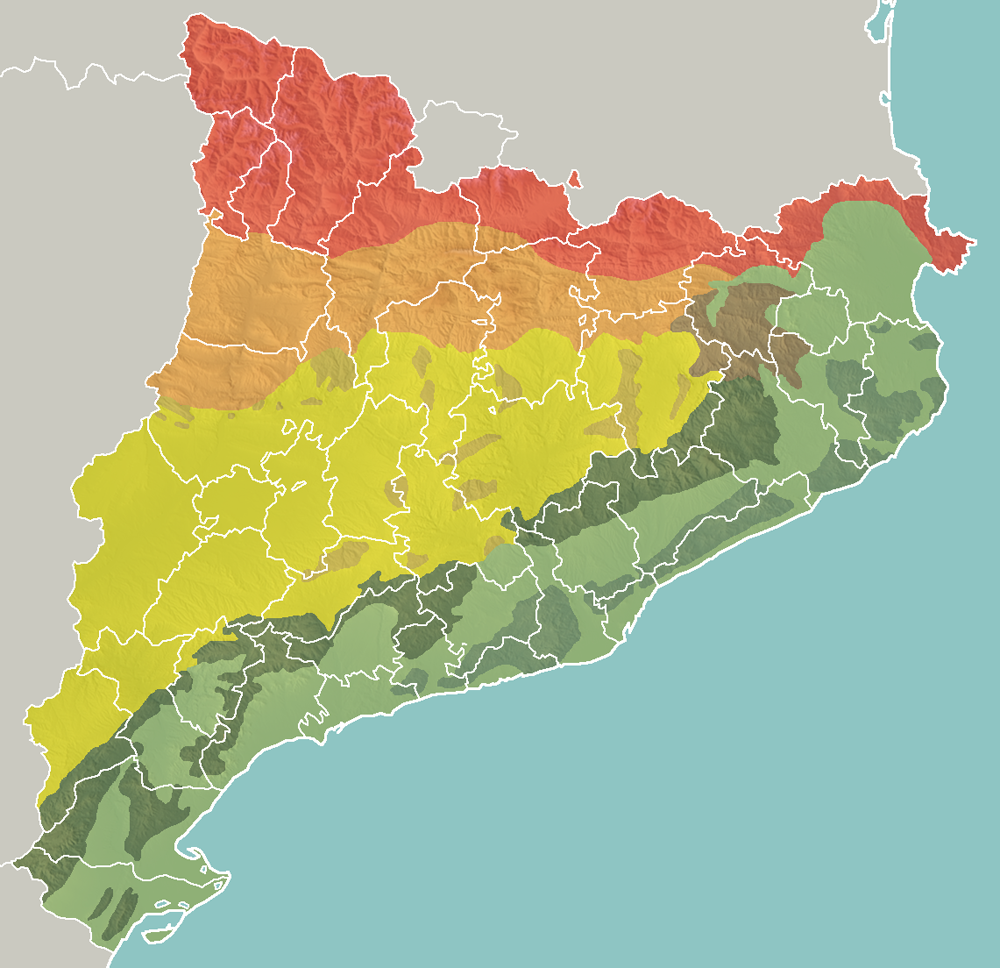
Geomorphologic map of Catalonia: Pyrenees; Pre-Pyrenees; Catalan Central Depression; Smaller mountain ranges of the Central Depression; Catalan Transversal Range; Catalan Pre-Coastal Range; Catalan Coastal Range; Catalan Coastal Depression and other coastal and pre-coastal plains

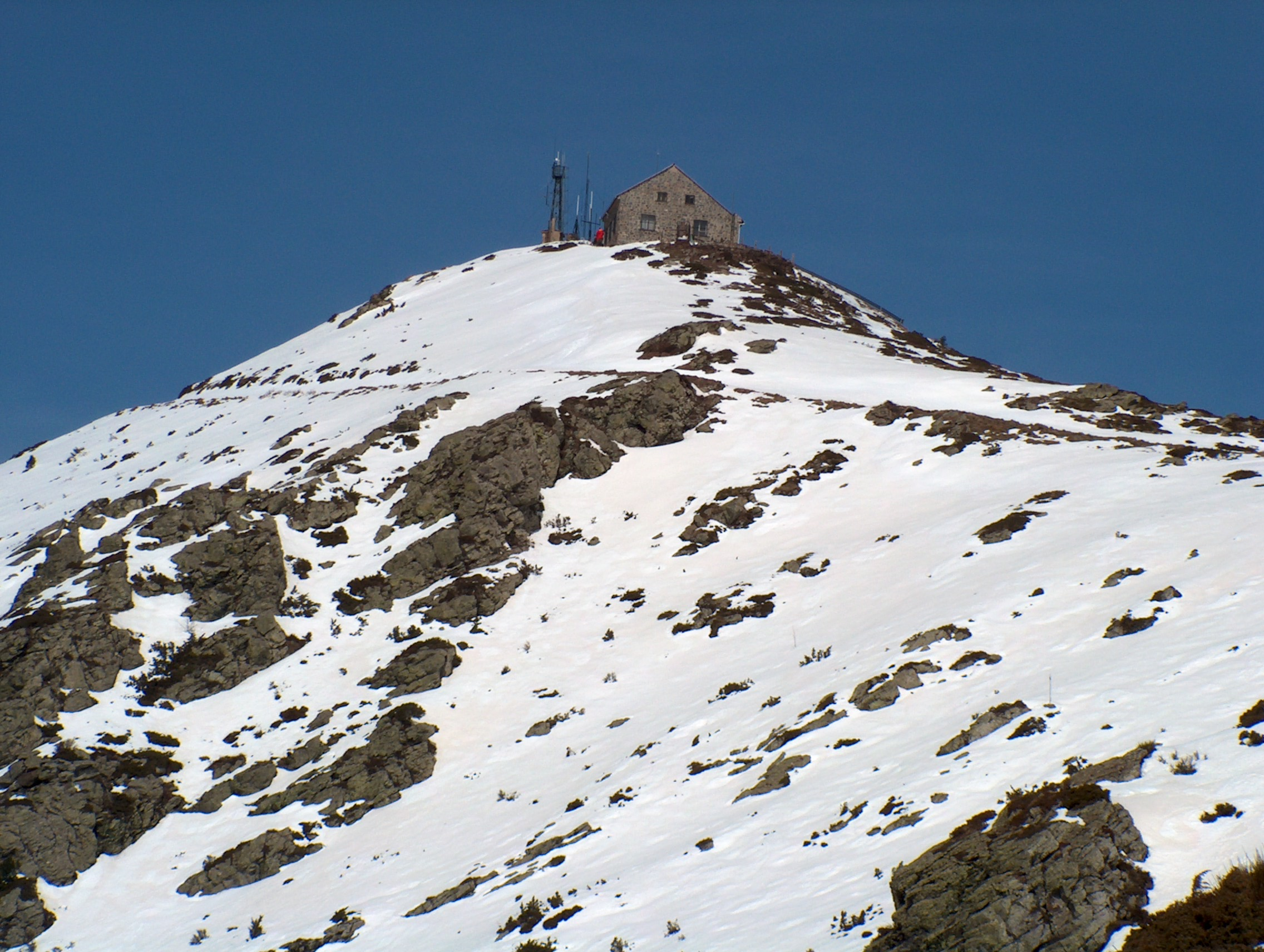
The Turo de l'Home, highest summit of the Montseny Massif

The Catalan Pre-Coastal Range (Catalan: Serralada Prelitoral Catalana) is a system of mountain ranges running parallel to the Mediterranean Sea coast in Catalonia. It is part of the Catalan Mediterranean System. Its main axis runs between the Catalan Transversal Range and the Serra de l'Espina, which connects with the Ports de Tortosa-Beseit, part of the Iberian System. The highest point is 1,706.7 m at the Montseny Massif.

== Mountain ranges ==
From North to South:

- Les Guilleries
- Montseny Massif
- Sant Llorenç de Munt
- Montserrat
- Serra de Queralt, Bellprat
- Picorandan
- Serra de Prades
- Montsant
- Serra de Llaberia
- Tivissa-Vandellòs Mountains. Towards the southern end of the Catalan Pre-Coastal Range, there are certain coastal mountain ranges like los Dedalts, Moles del Taix, and Serra de la Mar which —lacking a traditional geographical name as a group— have been recently named as the 'Tivissa-Vandellòs Mountains' (Muntanyes de Tivissa-Vandellòs). These are included in the Pre-Coastal Range owing to the geological continuity with that range despite their direct seaside location in the Coll de Balaguer area.
- Massís de Cardó
- Serra de la Vall de la Torre
- Serra de Cavalls
- Serra de Pàndols
- Serra del Montsià. A limestone range located by the coast south of the Ebre river.

== Ecology ==
The protected areas in the Catalan Pre-Coastal Range are: Parc Natural del Montseny, Parc Natural de Sant Llorenç del Munt i l'Obac, Parc Natural de Montserrat, Parc Natural dels Ports de Tortosa-Beseit and Parc Natural de la Serra de Montsant.

== See also ==
- Catalan Coastal Range
- Montseny Range
- Montserrat (mountain)
