= Jamie Foyers =

"Jamie Foyers" is a song by the folk singer and songwriter Ewan MacColl. In The Essential Ewan MacColl Songbook, Peggy Seeger wrote that the song was written in the period 1937-1939 but could not give an exact year (although it is difficult to see how it could have been written before the First Battle of Gandesa in April 1938). MacColl never recorded the song for commercial release, but he registered the copyright in the USA in 1963 under his company, Stormking Music.

It tells the story of a shipyard worker from the Clyde who goes to fight with the International Brigades in the Spanish Civil War. He fights at the Battle of Belchite, and is killed at Gandesa (it is not clear if this is at the first or second battles, the International Brigade played an important role in both).

MacColl adapted it from a traditional Scottish song about a soldier who fought in the Peninsular War, only retaining the first verse. By some accounts, Jamie Foyers was an actual person who was killed at Burgos in 1812, but by other accounts it was originally a generic Perthshire term for a soldier.

There is a last verse in some recordings of the song that does not appear in the version in The Essential Ewan MacColl Songbook.

He lies by the Ebro in far away Spain,
He died so that freedom and justice might reign;
Remember young Foyers and others of worth
And don't let one fascist be left on this earth.

== See also ==
- Tommy Atkins
