= Benissanet =

- Municipality
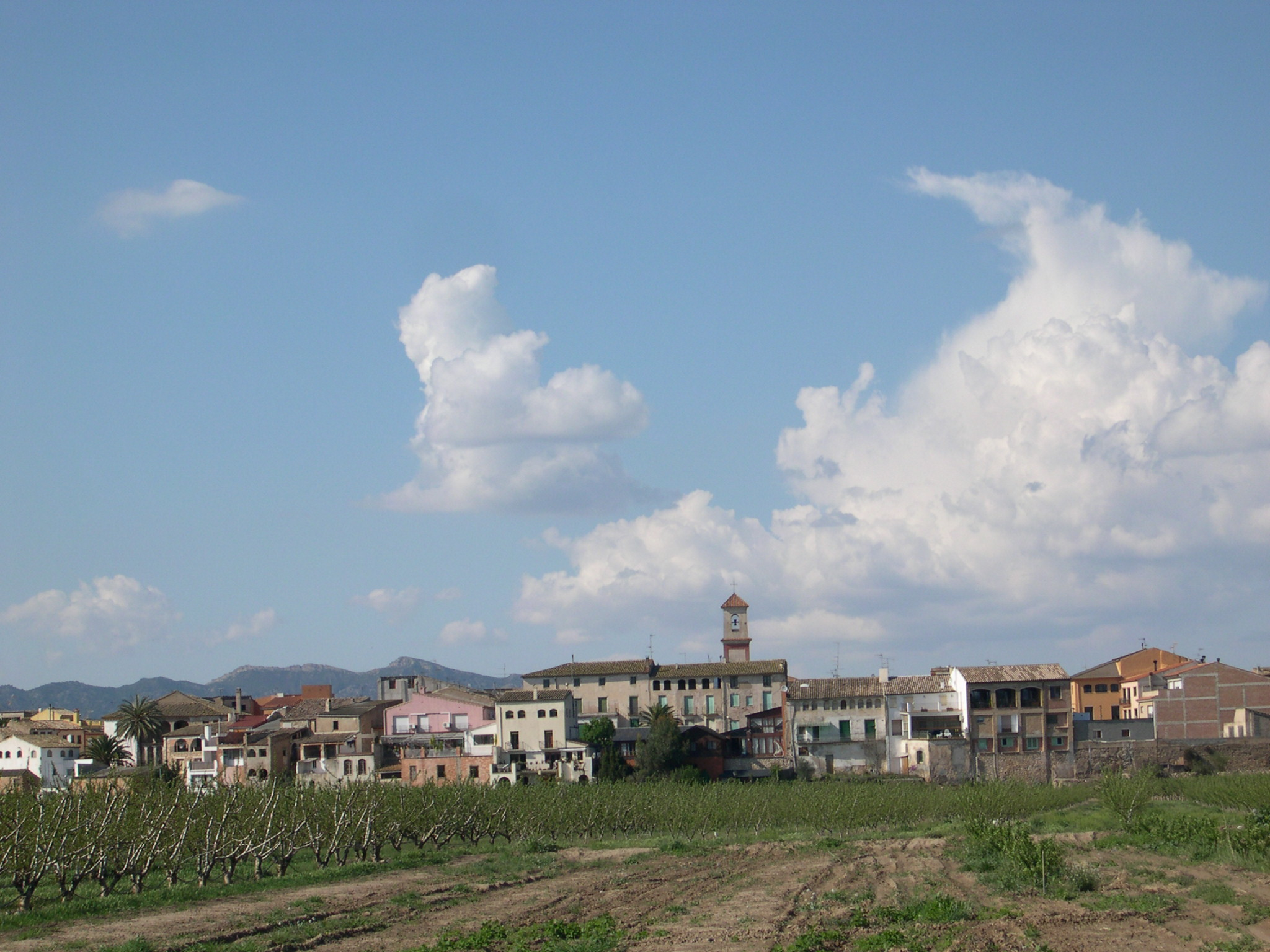

- Location in Catalonia
- Coordinates: 41°03′32″N 0°38′0″E
- Country: Spain
- Community: Catalonia
- Province: Tarragona
- Comarca: Ribera d'Ebre

Government
  - Mayor: Xavier Arbó Cot (2015)

Area
  - Total: 23.1 km^{2} (8.9 sq mi)
- Elevation: 38 m (125 ft)

Population (2025-01-01)
  - Total: 1,186
  - Density: 51.3/km^{2} (133/sq mi)
- Demonym: Benissanetà
- Postal code: 43747
- Website: www.benissanet.cat

Benissanet (Catalan pronunciation: [benisaˈnet]) is a municipality in the comarca of Ribera d'Ebre in the province of Tarragona, Catalonia, Spain. It has a population of 1,186 (register office, 2025).
