= Serra de Pàndols =

Mountain chain in Spain

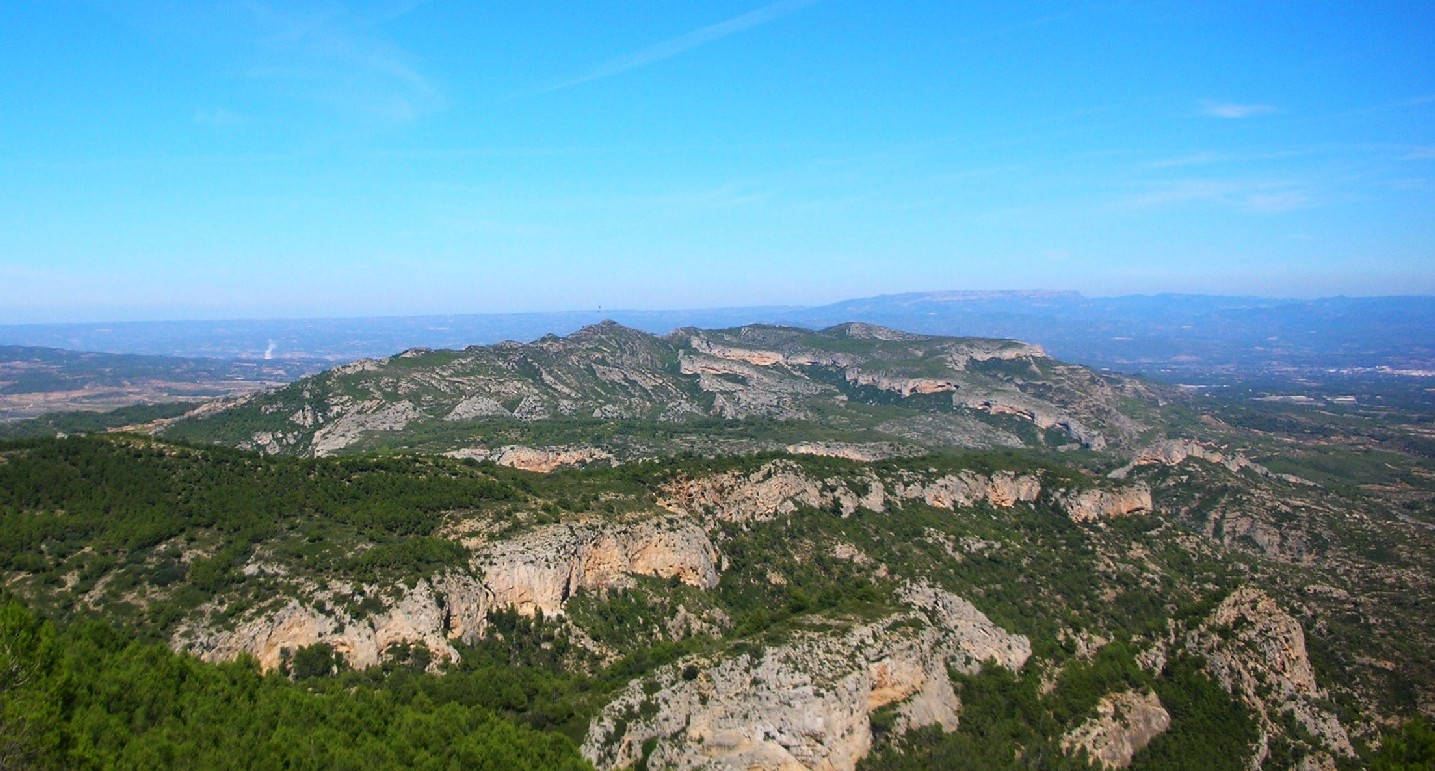
- Serra de Pàndols seen from Hill 705

Highest point
- Elevation: 705 m (2,313 ft)
- Coordinates: 41°01′13.68″N 00°27′27.88″E

Geography
- Location within Catalonia
- Location: Terra Alta, Spain
- Parent range: Catalan Pre-Coastal Range

Geology
- Mountain type: Limestone

Climbing
- Easiest route: Drive from Gandesa or El Pinell de Brai

Serra de Pàndols is a limestone mountain chain located at the southern end of the Catalan Pre-Coastal Range, in Catalonia, Spain.

There is a project to install wind turbines on the Serra de Pàndols and neighboring Serra de Cavalls which has met with public protests. The Serra de Paüls mountain range is located to the south of this range.

== Hill 705 ==
The ridge's highest point is Punta Alta (705.5 m). This summit was known as Hill 705 (Cota 705) during the Battle of the Ebro, the bloodiest and most protracted series of combats in the Spanish Civil War (1936–1939). The Battle was also the last action of the International Brigades, who were withdrawn midway through it.

Close to the peak stands a monument to those who died in the battles. Hill 705 was a key position to control the Serra de Pàndols range at the time of the Battle of the Ebro. The summit lies within the Pinell de Brai municipal term.

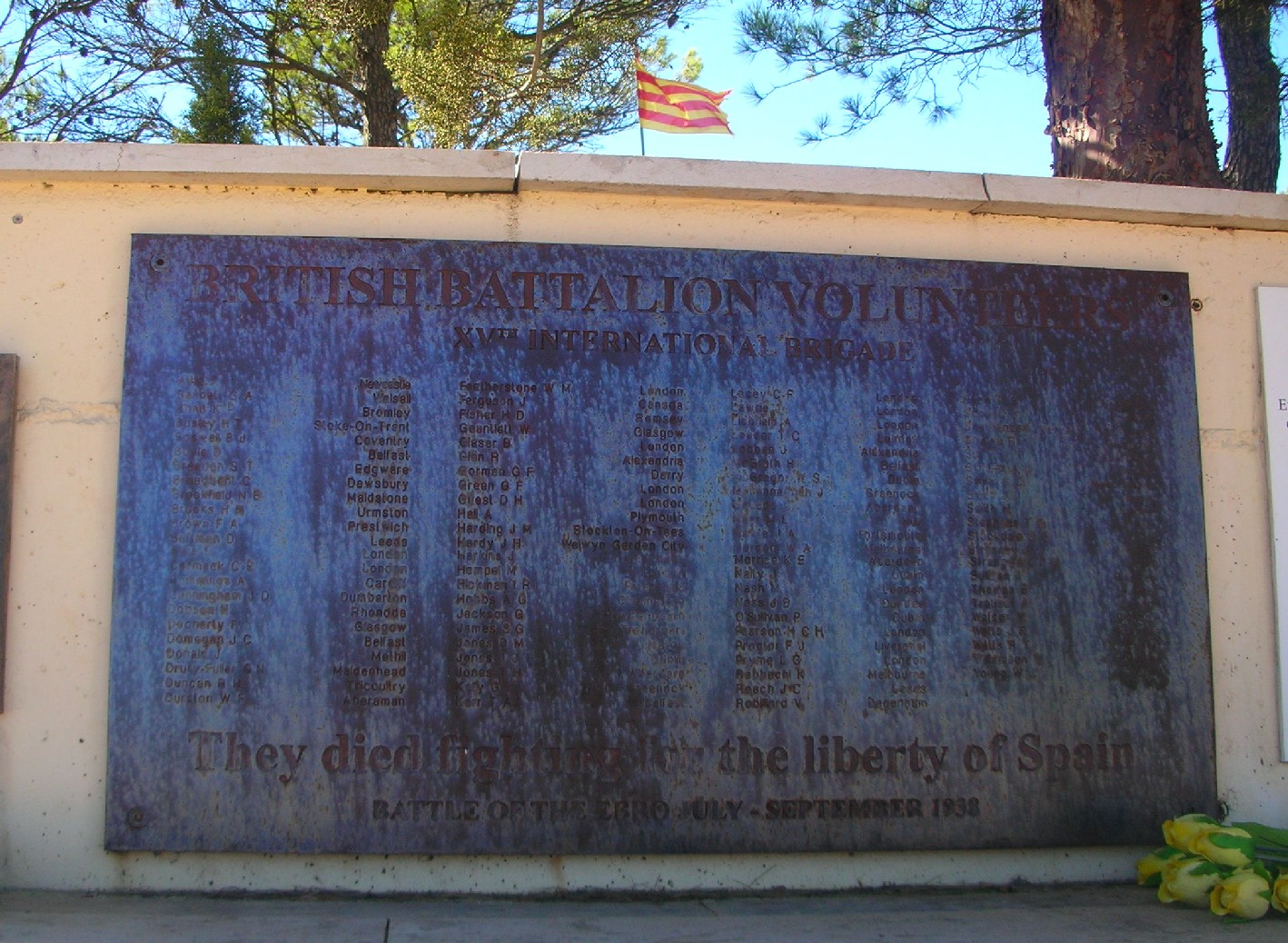
Bronze plaque honoring the British volunteer soldiers of the International Brigades who died in combat on cota 705.

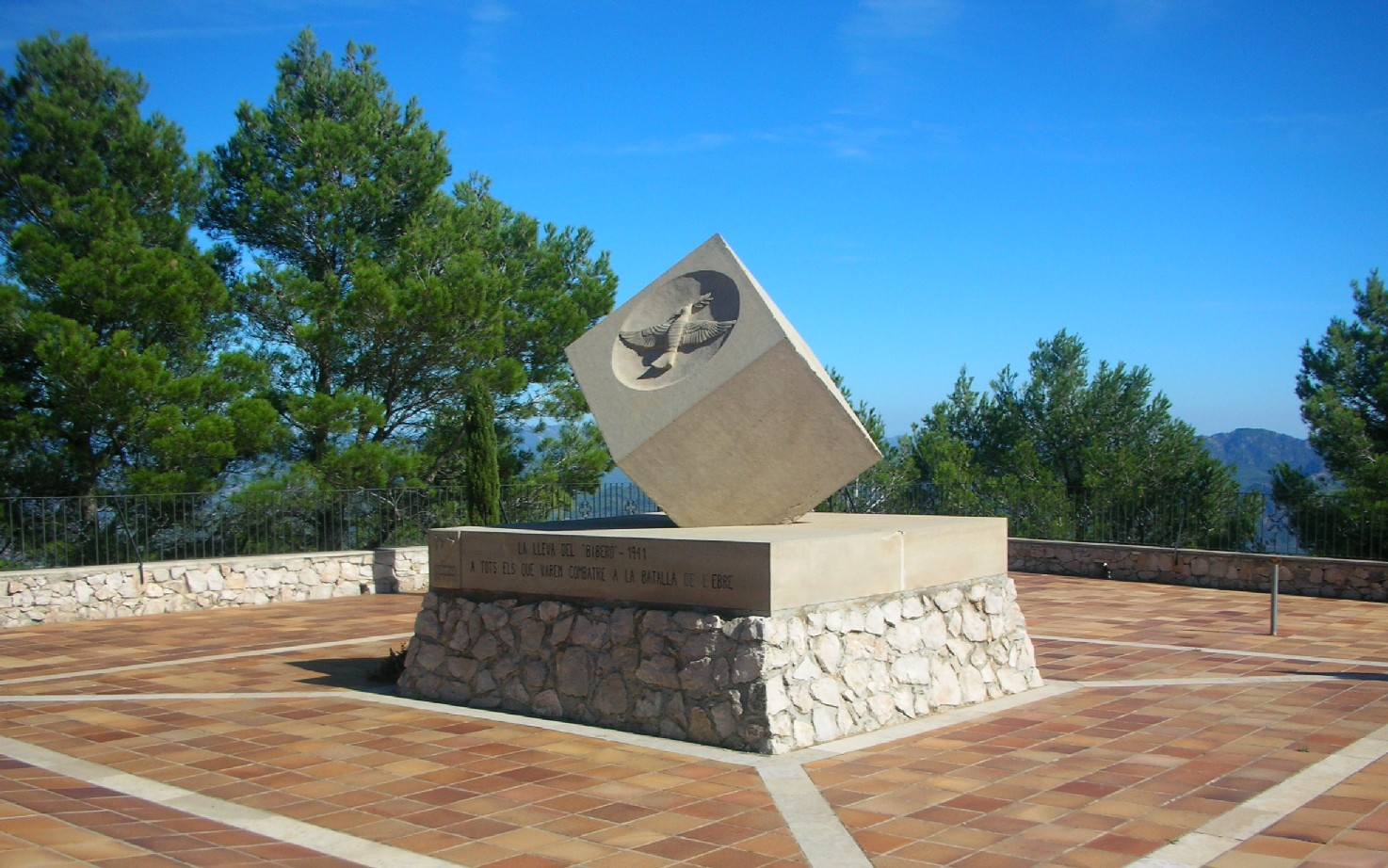
Monument to those who died defending the Spanish Republic in the battles located on Hill 705

== See also ==
- 11th Division (Spain)

== Bibliography ==
- Jaume Aguadé i Sordé, El diari de guerra de Lluís Randé i Inglés; Batalles del Segre i de l’Ebre i camps de concentració (abril 1938 - juliol 1939), El Tinter ISBN 84-9791-082-6
