= Corbera d'Ebre =

- Municipality
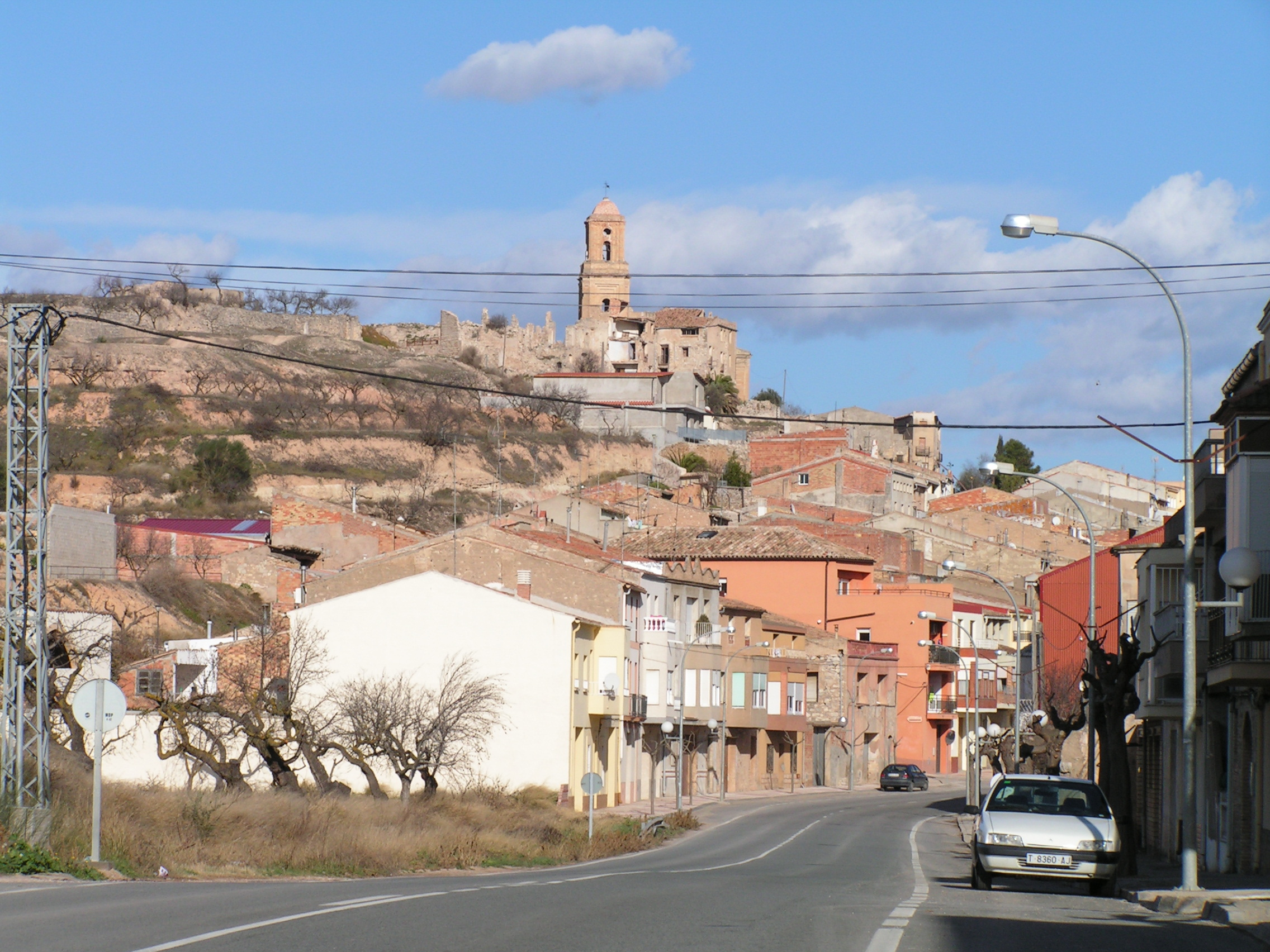
- Corbera d'Ebre, with the Old Town above

- Flag Coat of arms

- Location in Catalonia
- Coordinates: 41°4′43″N 0°28′36″E
- Country: Spain
- Community: Catalonia
- Province: Tarragona
- Comarca: Terra Alta

Government
  - mayor: Antonio Alvarez Gironés (2015)

Area
  - Total: 53.1 km^{2} (20.5 sq mi)
- Elevation: 337 m (1,106 ft)

Population (2025-01-01)
  - Total: 1,023
  - Density: 19.3/km^{2} (49.9/sq mi)
- Postal code: 43048
- Climate: Csa
- Website: www.corbera.altanet.org

Corbera d'Ebre (Catalan pronunciation: [koɾˈβeɾa ˈðeβɾe]) is a municipality in the comarca of la Terra Alta in Catalonia, Spain. It is one of the 12 municipalities comprising the wine-growing region of the Spanish Denominación de Origen classification of the Spanish wine Terra Alta. It has a population of 1,023 (register office, 2025).

== History ==
=== Spanish Civil War ===
The town of the same name was completely destroyed in the Spanish Civil War during the Battle of the Ebro (25 July–16 November 1938) and although the lower part of the town was rebuilt, the upper part, known as Poble Vell (Old Town), including the old church on the hill, has been kept as a reminder.

The town has one of the five information centres run by COMEBE, a public consortium, including the Generalitat de Catalunya, that was founded in 2001 to recover the historical memory of the areas in which the 115-day-long Battle of the Ebro, the longest, bloodiest and most decisive battle of the Spanish Civil War, took place. The Centre d'interpretació de la batalla de l'Ebre (Battle of the Ebro Information Centre) has marked paths on a circuit around the area.

At the end of March 1938, following the Aragon Offensive, the Lincoln-Washington Battalion, part of the 35th Division retreating from Belchite, where they had lost 400 from a total of 500 men, had camped in the area of Corbera. However, they were unaware that the town had been in Francoist hands since noon on April 2, and several American brigadiers of the Lincoln and Washington Battalions of the International Brigades passing through were captured and executed, including the commanding officer of the Battalion, Major Merriman, and his second in command, David Doran.

Merriman's post as commander of the Battalion was taken by Milt Wolff, the last commander of the XV International Brigade's Lincoln Battalion. They regrouped on the banks of the Ebro to participate in the Ebro offensive, their numbers gradually increasing to around 700 men, including Spanish troops.

After heavy fighting in the area, and heavy losses, at the beginning of September, the Lincoln Battalion was back in the vicinity of Corbera, only to be withdrawn from the region towards the end of the month, following the September 21 announcement by the prime minister of Spain, Juan Negrín, before the League of Nations at Geneva, of his decision to unilaterally withdraw all international troops from the Republican Army.

The town also has a museum with Civil War artefacts and memorabilia.

== Notable people ==
- Jaume Ferran i Clua (1851–1929), bacteriologist

== Bibliography ==
- Panareda Clopés, Josep Maria; Rios Calvet, Jaume; Rabella Vives, Josep Maria (1989). Guia de Catalunya, Barcelona: Caixa de Catalunya. ISBN 84-87135-01-3 (Spanish). ISBN 84-87135-02-1 (Catalan).
