= Gandesa =

- Municipality
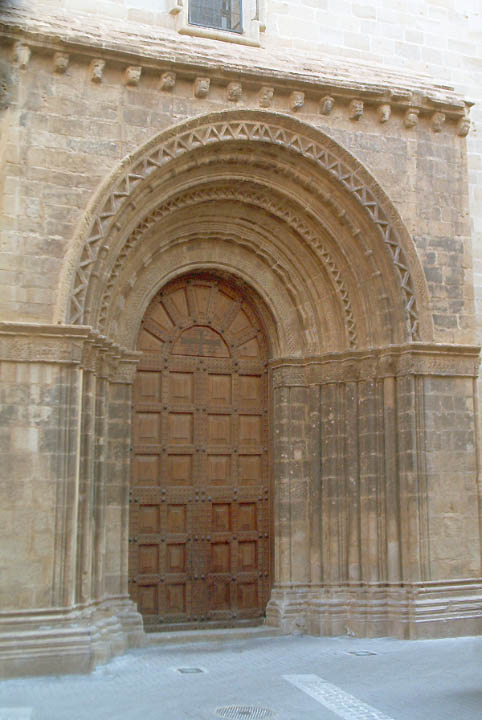
- Church door, Gandesa

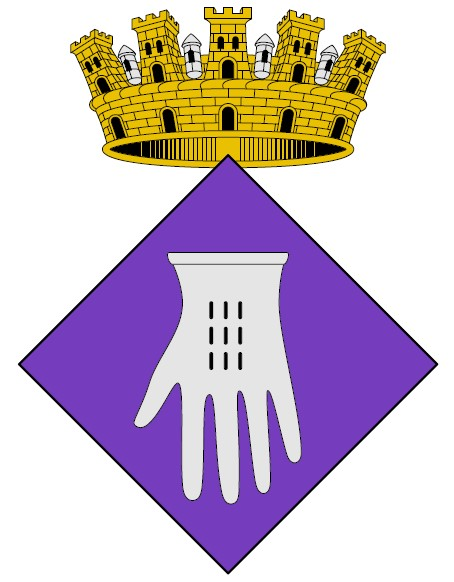
- Coat of arms

- Location in Catalonia
- Coordinates: 41°03′19″N 0°26′23″E
- Country: Spain
- Community: Catalonia
- Province: Tarragona
- Comarca: Terra Alta

Government
  - Mayor: Carles Luz Muñoz (2015)

Area
  - Total: 71.2 km^{2} (27.5 sq mi)
- Elevation: 368 m (1,207 ft)

Population (2025-01-01)
  - Total: 3,150
  - Density: 44.2/km^{2} (115/sq mi)
- Postal code: 43064
- Climate: Csa
- Website: www.gandesa.cat

Gandesa (Catalan pronunciation: [ɡanˈdeza]) is the capital of the comarca of Terra Alta, in the province of Tarragona, Catalonia, Spain. It has a population of 3,150 (register office, 2025).

== History ==
In the place known as Coll del Moro there is an ancient Iberian archaeological site belonging to the Ilercavones tribe that lived in this area before Roman times.

Gandesa has a church with unusual and interesting sculptures on the Romanesque porch.

The old winery of Gandesa, also known in Catalonia as one of the Wine Cathedrals, is from Modernisme and Noucentisme style and was designed by the architect Cèsar Martinell in 1919.

Gandesa was at the center of fighting during the Battle of the Ebro (Battle of Gandesa and Siege of Gandesa) in the Spanish Civil War. In the summer of 1938, Republican forces crossed the Ebro in an attempt to throw back the Nationalist armies of General Franco. This is mentioned in the ballad "Jamie Foyers" and Si me quieres escribir, also known as El Frente de Gandesa. Now there is a museum devoted to the Battle of the Ebro in Gandesa.

On December 23, 1948, an Iberia Airlines Douglas DC-3 crashed in bad weather near Gandesa killing all 27 occupants.
