= Biscotti (disambiguation) =

Biscotti are Italian almond biscuits from Prato, Italy

Biscotti may also refer to:

- Biscotti Regina, small Italian biscuits
- Enrico Biscotti Company, bakery and restaurant in Pittsburgh T
- Rossella Biscotti, (born 1978), Italian visual artist
