= Biscotti =

Italian twice-baked almond biscuits

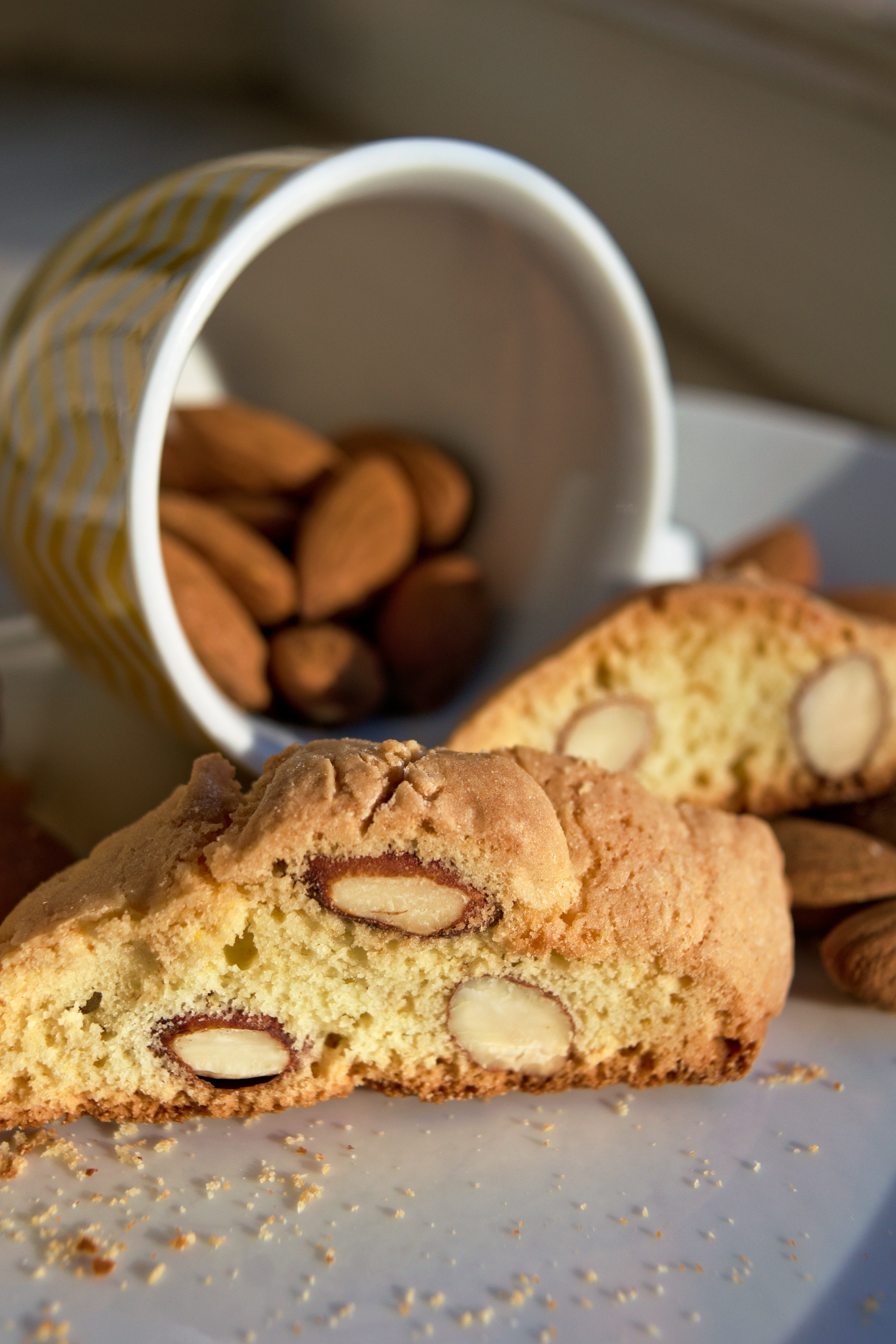
- Two biscotti served with a cup of fresh almonds
- Alternative names: Biscotto (Italian singular form)
- Type: Biscuit
- Place of origin: Italy
- Main ingredients: Flour, sugar, eggs, and almonds or pine nuts

Biscotti are Italian almond biscuits originating in the city of Prato, Tuscany. They are twice-baked, oblong-shaped, dry, and crunchy. In Italy, they are known as cantucci, biscotti di Prato or biscotti etruschi and may be dipped in a drink, traditionally Vin Santo. Smaller biscotti may be known as biscottini or cantuccini. In Italian, the word biscotti (sing.: biscotto) encompasses all types of biscuits or cookies.

== Etymology ==
The Italian word biscotti (sing.: biscotto) originates from the Medieval Latin word biscoctus, meaning 'twice-cooked', which described items that were made from dough and baked twice, so they became very dry and could be stored for long periods of time. Such non-perishable food was particularly useful during journeys and wars, and twice-baked breads were a staple food of the Roman legions.

Biscotti, in this sense, shares its origin with the English biscuit (from Old French biscuit), which is used for a wide variety of baked goods, biscuits, crackers, and breads, only a few of which are actually baked twice.

In modern Italian, the word biscotto refers to any biscuit or cookie. The biscuit known to English-speakers as biscotti is usually called cantuccio, a word that means 'corner' but in the past meant the crust or heel of a loaf of bread. The words biscottini and cantuccini are diminutives that refer to smaller versions of biscotti or cantucci.

== History ==
=== Italy ===
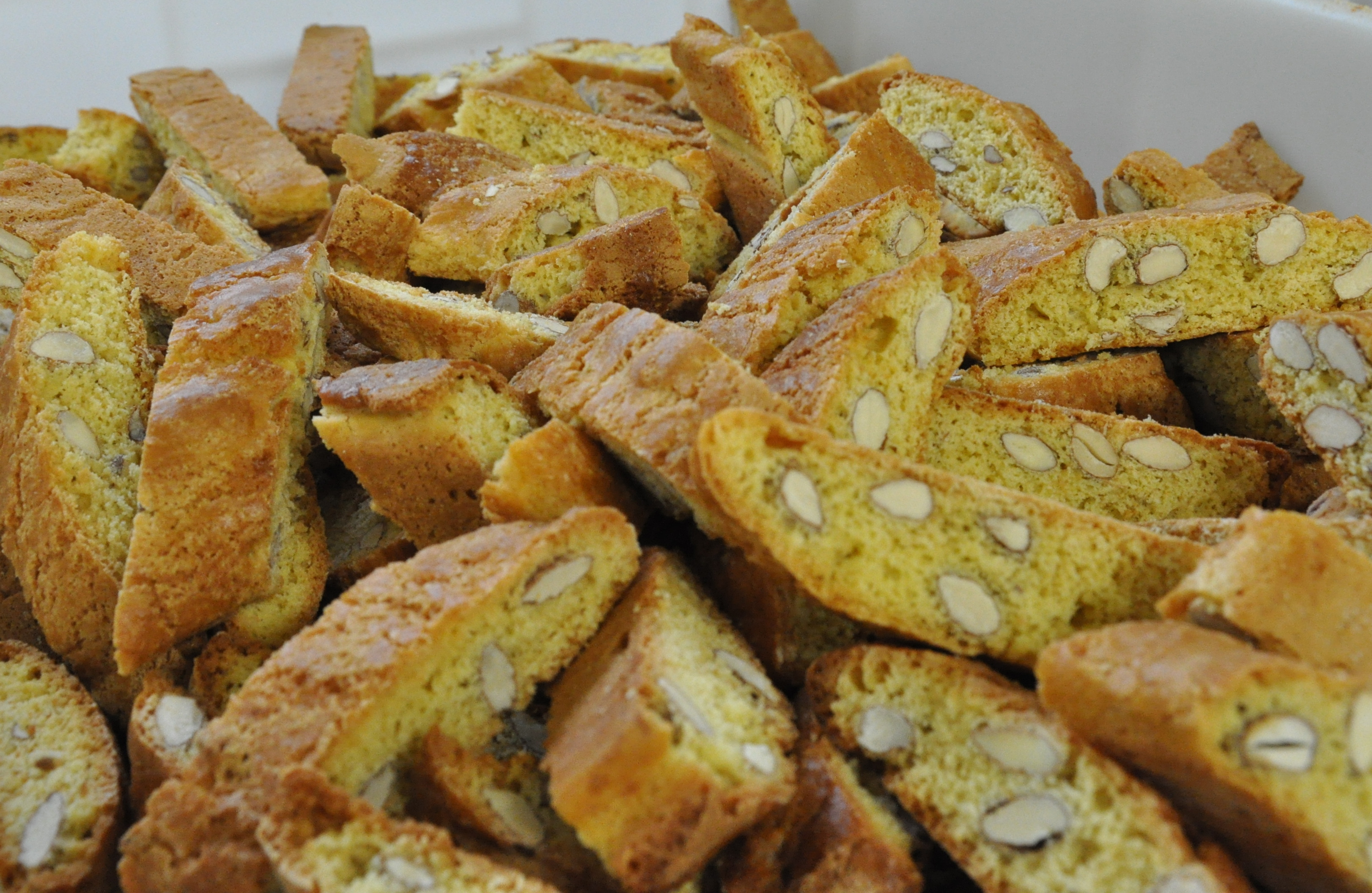
Almond cantuccini

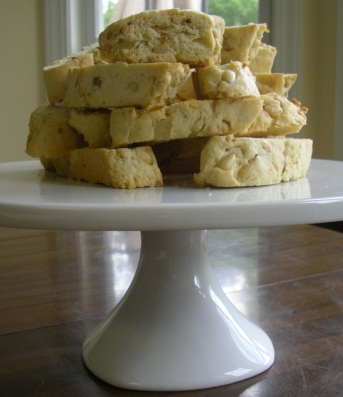
Cantucci di pinoli, a variation made with pine nuts rather than almonds

Although commonly used to indicate the biscuits of Prato, biscotti di Prato, in modern Italy they are also known widely by the name cantuccini. These names actually suggest other similar regional products of Italy. The term cantuccini is most commonly used today in Tuscany, but originally referred to variations or imitations which deviated from the traditional recipe in a few key points such as the use of yeasts and flavourings. Rusks are larger, longer biscuits using rustic bread dough enriched with olive oil and anise seeds.

The confusion on the name may have been borne from the fact that on the old sign (still present) of "Biscottificio Antonio Mattei", the leading manufacturer of biscuits of Prato, written just below the name of the shop is "Manufacturers of cantuccini", which at the time was one of the major producers of the biscuits. The sign has remained unchanged, and after such a long time people are accustomed to associate the name cantuccini with the biscuits typical of Sardinia and Sicily.

=== The rest of Europe ===
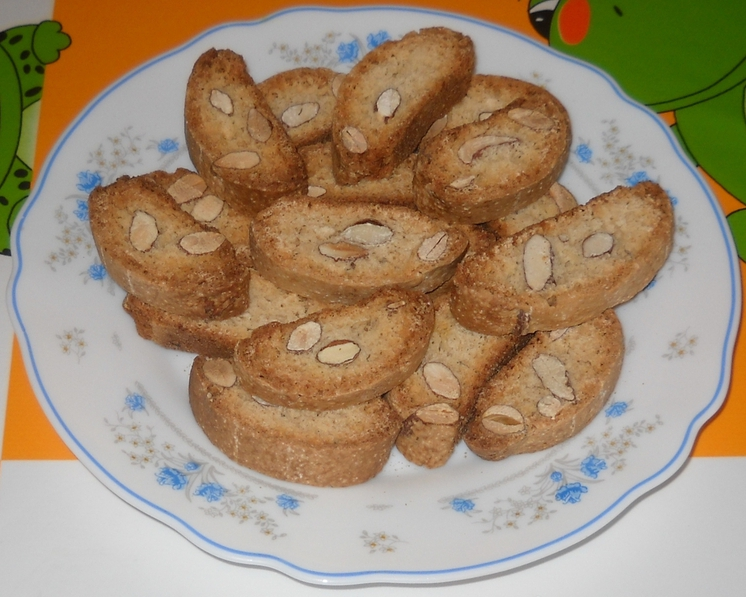
Carquinyolis, a Catalan variation of biscotti made with whole or sliced almonds

In Spain and France, the Catalan carquinyoli (Catalan: [kəɾkiˈɲɔli]) or carquinyol is made with whole or sliced almonds. It is associated with inland Catalonia, Batea, La Fatarella, Prat de Comte, and in the Terra Alta.

Biscotti are traditional also in some inland towns in Valencia, where they are called rosegons or rosegós. In Menorca, carquinyols are square shaped and do not include whole almonds. One Catalan food writer states that the word carquinyoli is derived from the French croquignole, a French word of Germanic origin, but In France, a similar biscuit is known as croquant.

== Recipes ==
Following rediscovery of the original recipe by Prato pastry chef Antonio Mattei in the 19th century, his variation is what is now accepted as the traditional recipe for biscotti. Mattei brought his cakes to the Exposition Universelle of Paris of 1867, winning a special mention.

The mixture is composed exclusively of flour, sugar, eggs, pine nuts, and almonds that are not roasted or skinned. The traditional recipe uses no form of yeast or fat (butter, oil, and milk). The barely wet dough is then cooked twice: once in slab form, and again after cutting in sliced form, with the second baking defining how hard the biscotti are.

=== Modern variations ===
Today the regional variations of the original are still adhered to, but the modern mass-manufactured biscotti are in fact closer to cantuccini, variations of biscotti.

Modern biscotti recipes often contain nuts (traditional almonds, pine nuts, pistachios, and hazelnuts are popular choices) or spices such as anise or cinnamon.

Modern recipes include adding baking powder and spices to the flour. The nuts are then added to allow them to be coated, with the skins being left particularly when using almonds and hazelnuts. Separately, eggs are beaten together and then any wet flavouring (e.g., almond extract or liquor), before being added to the dry ingredients. Following twice baking (once in long slab form, secondly in cut sliced form), the biscotti may be dipped in a glaze, such as chocolate.

== Uses ==
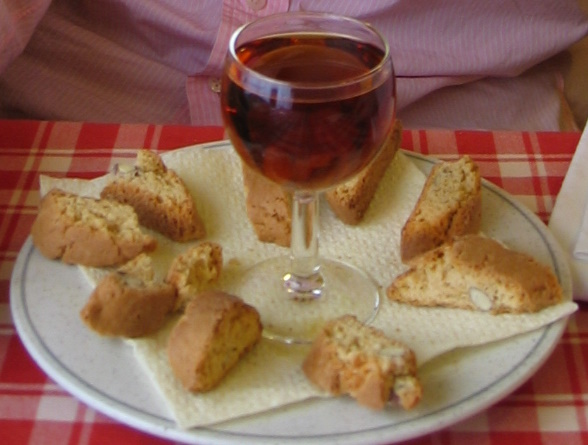
Tuscan-style biscotti served with Vin Santo

Since they are very dry, biscotti traditionally are served with a drink into which they may be dunked. In Italy, they are typically served as an after-dinner dessert with a Tuscan fortified wine called Vin Santo.

In Catalonia, carquinyolis are usually served with a small glass of a sweet dessert wine, such as muscat or moscatell.

Biscotti are also used as an ingredient in a variety of traditional dishes. In Catalonia, such dishes include rice with sardines and rabbit with snails. They are also used in sauces with calçots, a type of green onion. In coastal Baix Llobregat, biscotti are used in the sauce for a dish of duck stuffed with turnips.

== Culture ==
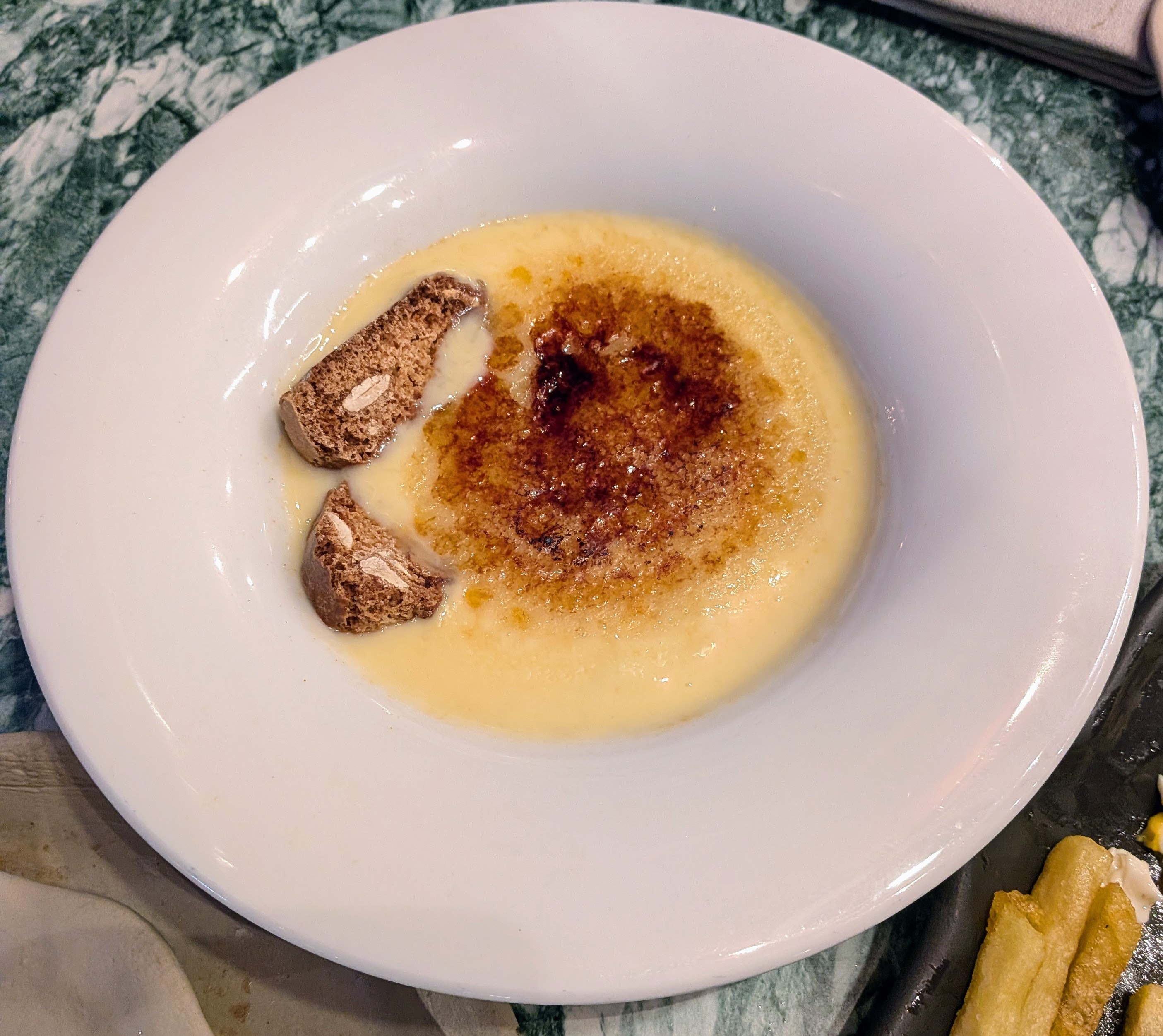
Crema catalana with carquinyoli in a white dish

In the Catalan city of Vic, Carquinyoli is also the name of a ceremonial figure who orchestrates an annual summer festival in honor of the patron saint Albert of Sicily. In Vilanova i la Geltrú, biscotti with almonds are called currutacos and are most typically associated with Palm Sunday, when they are used to ornament the palm leaves that are distributed to worshipers.

== See also ==
- List of Italian desserts and pastries
- List of almond dishes
- Rusk
- Biscotti regina

== Bibliography ==
- Umberto Mannucci (1973). Bisenzio tradizioni e cucina (in Italian). Prato: Libreria del Palazzo.
