= Eix Transversal =

Primary highway in Catalonia, Spain

Coordinates: 41°52′36″N 2°44′25″E

Autovía C-25
- Eix Transversal

Route information
- Length: 141 km (88 mi)

Major junctions
- From: Cervera
- To: Cassà de la Selva

Location
- Country: Spain

Highway system
- Highways in Spain; Autopistas and autovías; National Roads

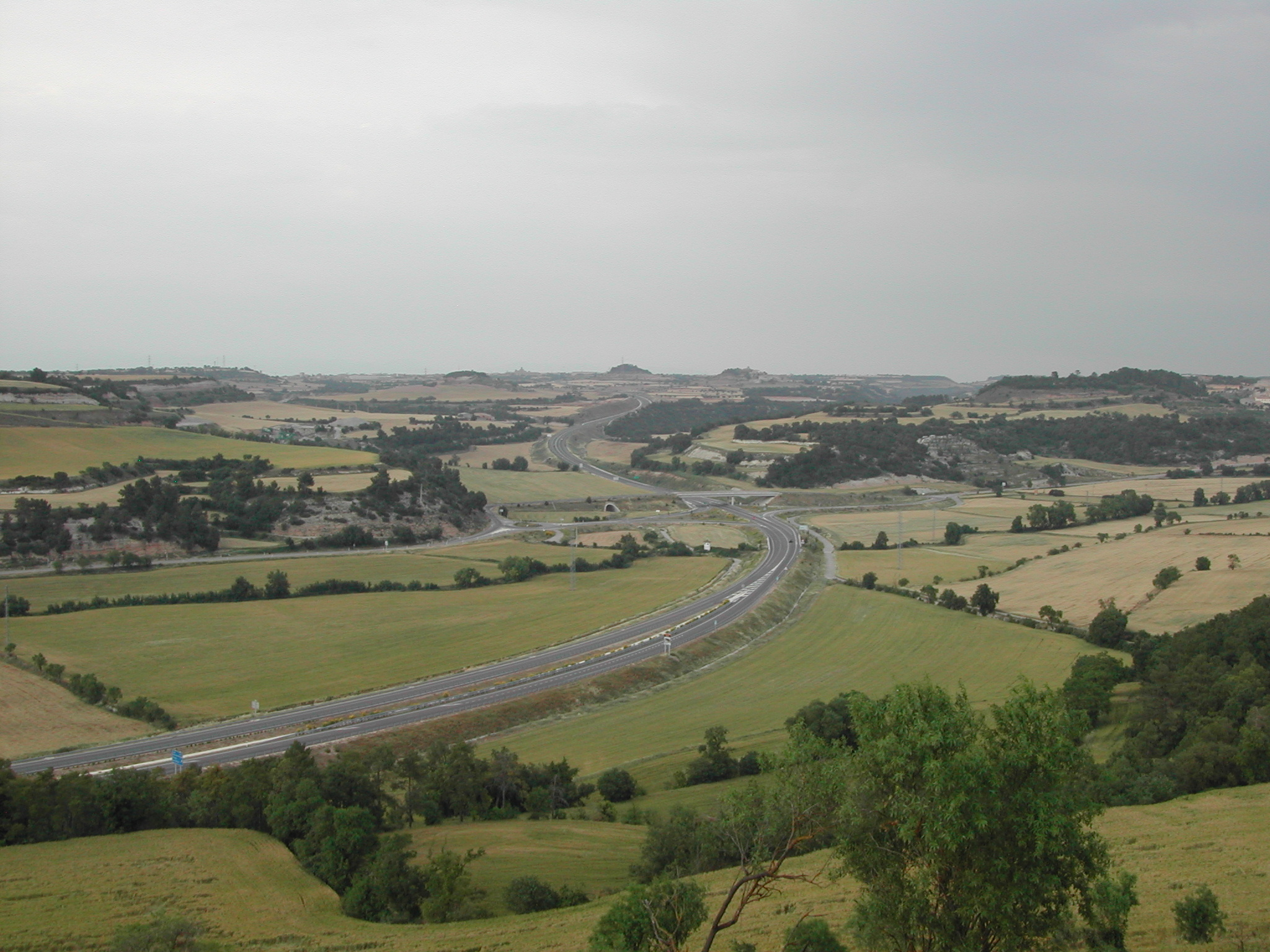
Catalonia Transversal road seen from Montfalcó Murallat, Lleida.

Eix Transversal (English: Transversal Arterial Road; lit. Transversal Axis), labelled C-25, is a primary highway in Catalonia, Spain. It crosses the Catalan Transversal Range mountainous region, connecting the northern end of the Catalan Coastal Depression with the Catalan Central Depression.

According to the current coding for highways managed by the Generalitat de Catalunya, the first number C-25 indicates that is mainly a west-eastbound highway, and the second number C-25 indicates that is the fifth southernmost. The road begins at the intersection with Autovía A-2, near Cervera (comarca of Segarra), and finishes at Cassà de la Selva (comarca of Gironès), with a total length of 141 km.

== History ==
The last section of the C-25 to be constructed was finished in December 1997. The main aims of the construction of this highway were:

- to provide a high-speed alternative way for road traffic between Northeastern Catalonia (Girona, Figueres, La Jonquera...) and southern France with Western Catalonia (Lleida, Cervera...) and Aragón, avoiding the often congested Barcelona metropolitan region
- to provide a high-speed connection for Central Catalonia's main towns (Vic, Manresa, Ripoll, etc.), between them as well as with Northeastern and the Western Catalonia
- generally speaking, to create an "orbital route" in what in those days was mainly a radial network with its center in the city of Barcelona, i.e. a road network radiating out from Barcelona.

Despite these aims, the highway was built as a single-lane road and not as a freeway, and soon it was proved to become insufficient for the traffic supported.

On 2007 the Generalitat de Catalunya approved the upgrading of the highway to a freeway, which started on 2008 and is expected to be completed on 2011.

== Exits ==
Number	Destination
132	Prison of Sant Joan; Sant Joan de Vilatorrada Centre; Manresa University Zone (8th); Ring roads of Manresa (C-16, C-55, C-25)
136	Santpedor; Manresa North; Ring roads of Manresa (C-16, C-55, C-25)
180	Vic North, C-17 highway
182	Vic Centre; Manlleu
183	Roda de Ter, M.O.T. Vehicles Test
187	Sant Julià de Vilatorta; Calldetenes

== See also ==
- Catalan Transversal Range
- Autovía A-2
- List of primary highways in Catalonia
