= Batea =

Batea may refer to:

- Batea (crustacean), a genus of Amphipoda
- Batea (mythology), two characters in Greek mythology
- Batea, Tarragona, a municipality in the comarca of Terra Alta, Catalonia, Spain
- Batea, a pan used in gold panning
