= Salvador of Horta =

Christian saint

Saint Salvador of Horta O.F.M.
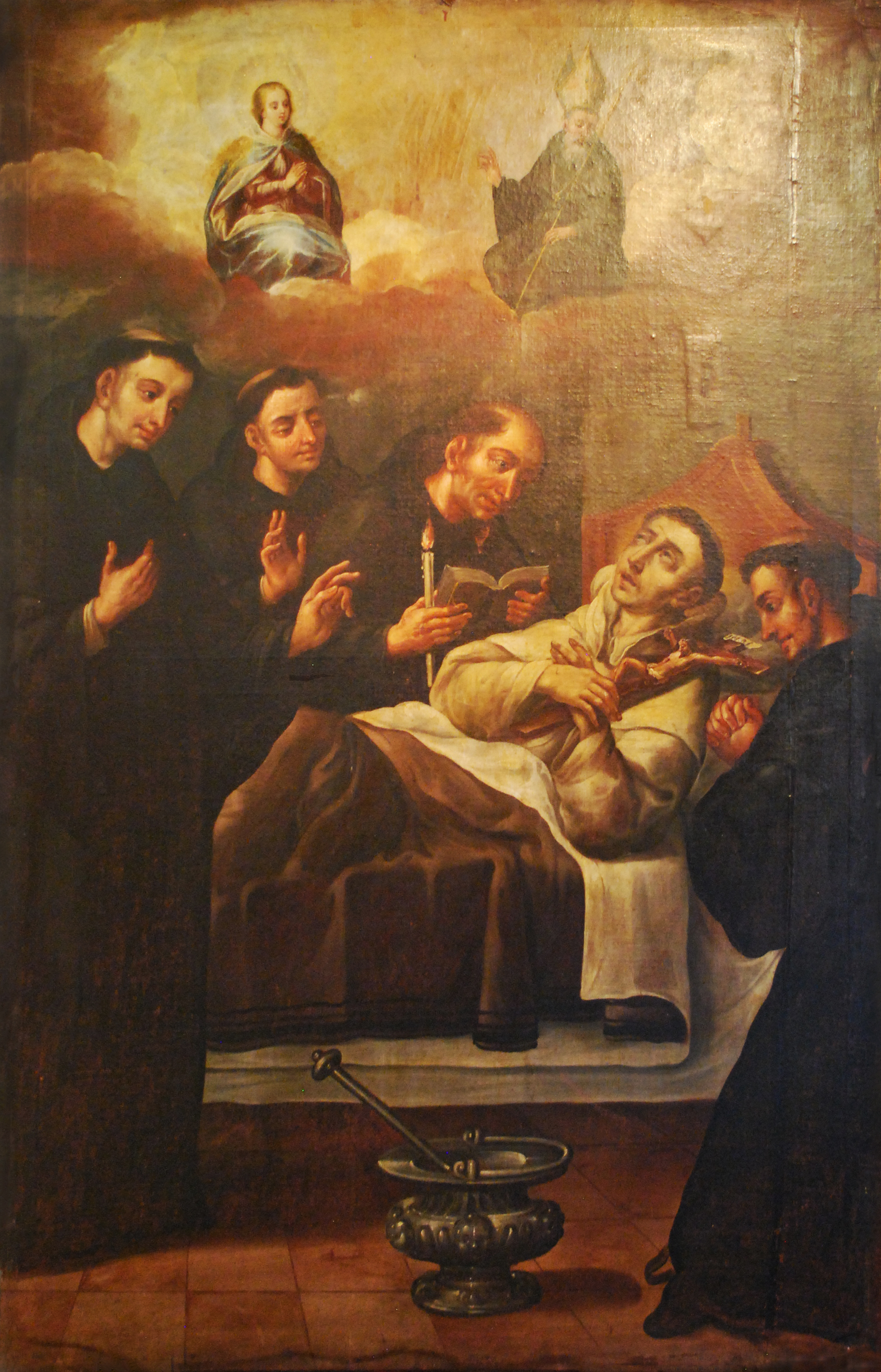
- Death of Saint Salvador of Horta; Viceregal Museum of Zinacantepec, Mexico

Wonderworker
- Born: December 1520; Santa Coloma de Farners, Girona, Spain
- Died: 18 March 1567 (aged 46); Cagliari, Sardinia, Spanish Empire
- Venerated in: Roman Catholic Church (Order of Friars Minor)
- Beatified: 5 February 1606 by Pope Paul V
- Canonized: 17 April 1938 by Pope Pius XI
- Major shrine: Church of St. Rosalie; Cagliari, Sardinia, Italy
- Feast: 18 March (17 April by the Friars Minor)

Salvador of Horta O.F.M. (Catalan: Salvador d'Horta; Spanish: Salvador de Horta; Italian: Salvatore da Horta; December 1520 – 18 March 1567) was a Spanish Franciscan lay brother from the region of Catalonia in Spain, who was celebrated as a miracle worker during his lifetime. He is honored as a saint by the Catholic Church.

== Life ==
He was born Salvador Pladevall i Bien some time during December 1520 in the hospital of Santa Coloma de Farners, located in the Catalan Province of Girona, where his parents worked as servants. Orphaned at age 14, he moved with his sister Blasa to Barcelona, where he worked as a shoemaker to support them both.

When his sister had married, Pladevall felt free to follow a religious calling he had felt. He first entered the famed Benedictine Abbey of Santa Maria de Montserrat, near Barcelona, to explore monastic life. Apparently not feeling drawn there, and desiring a more humble way of life, he entered the novitiate of the Observant branch of the Order of Friars Minor in Barcelona as a lay brother on 3 May 1541. He made his profession of vows in 1542, having become known among the friars for his asceticism and humility.

Salvador was then sent by his superiors to serve as the cook, designated beggar and porter at the friary at Tortosa. There Salvador soon acquired a reputation as a healer, and the friary became a destination for sick pilgrims. It was estimated by observers that the number of visitors to the friary numbered some 2,000 people per week.

As a result, Salvador's superiors developed a suspicion of him which was to shadow him for the rest of his life, and they began moving him to different friaries: first Bellpuig, then Lleida, followed by the remote village of Horta de Sant Joan, the town with which he is most identified, residing there 1547–1559 in the Friary of Our Lady of the Angels. Salvador was eventually moved to the friary of Reus and again to Madrid, where he was visited by King Philip II of Spain, followed by yet another move to the friary in Barcelona. While residing there, in 1560 he was denounced to the Spanish Inquisition for the many miracles attributed to his intercession. After some investigations, they chose to take no action against him.

In 1565 Salvador was assigned to the Friary of St. Mary of Jesus in Cagliari, on the island of Sardinia, then under the rule of Spain, where he continued to serve as the cook for the community. He also continued to have cures take place at his intercession. It was there that he died on 18 March 1567.

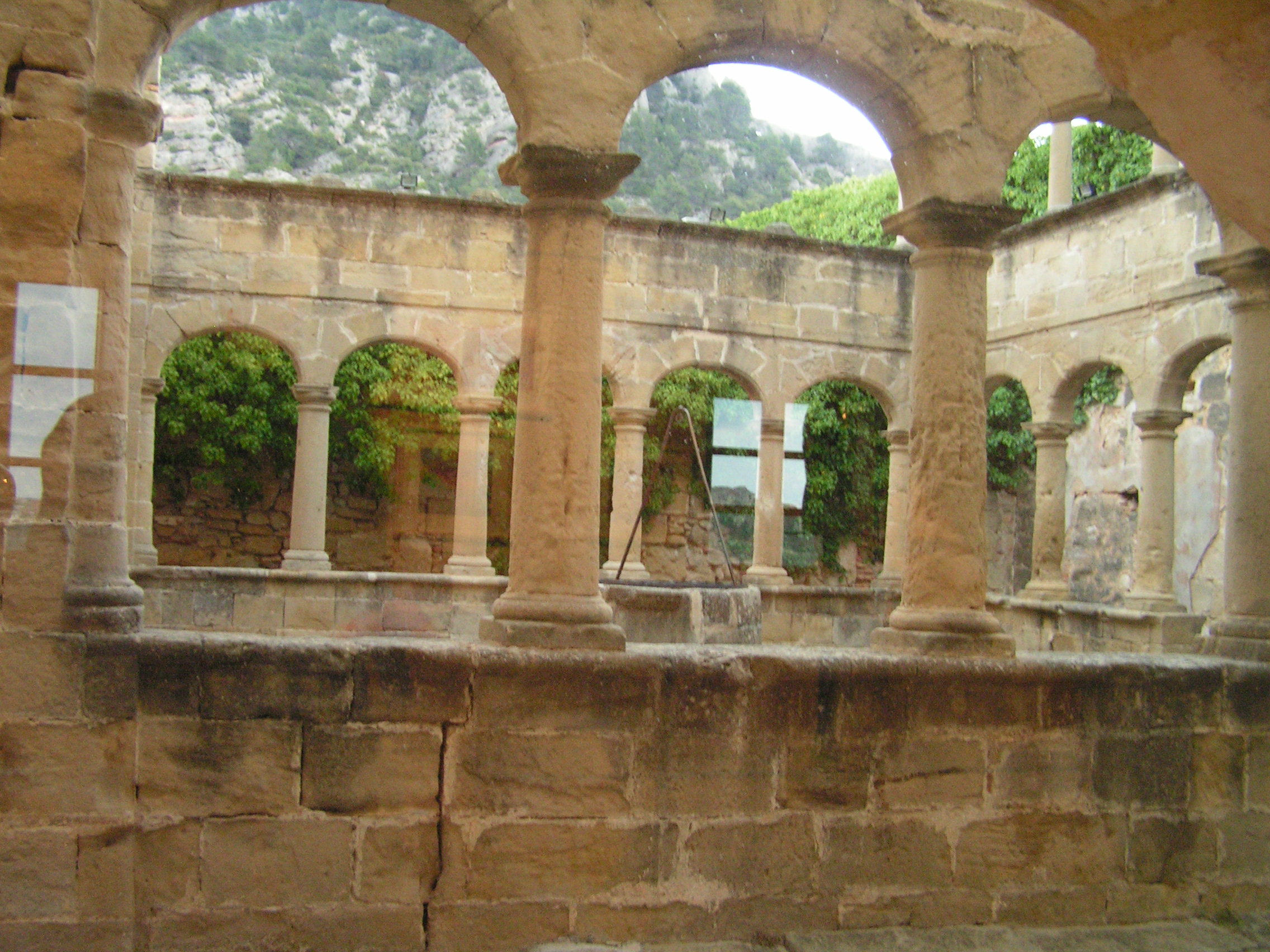
Remains of the cloister of the Franciscan friary in Horta de Sant Joan, where St. Salvador lived for twelve years.

== Veneration ==
At the request of King Philip, Salvador was allowed to be venerated as "Blessed" on 5 February 1606 by Pope Paul V, which was confirmed on 29 January 1711 by Pope Clement XI. He was canonized on 17 April 1938 by Pope Pius XI. His feast day is generally celebrated on 18 March, the anniversary of his death; it is observed, however, by the Friars Minor on 17 April, the anniversary of his canonization.

His remains were originally interred at the Church of St. Mary of Jesus attached to the friary where he died. In 1606 it had been decided to open his grave to provide his heart as a relic for the Franciscan community in Silke, near Sassari. When it was opened, his body was found to be still intact. Thus, when the Church of St. Mary of Jesus was demolished in 1718, his remains were interred first at another church of the Order in the city, then finally, in 1758, they were entombed in a glass coffin under the main altar of the Church of St. Rosalie in the city. This remains his shrine, where his remains can be venerated.

Veneration of Salvador spread throughout his native Catalunya and also in Calabria, long under Spanish rule.
