= La Granja d'Escarp =

- Municipality
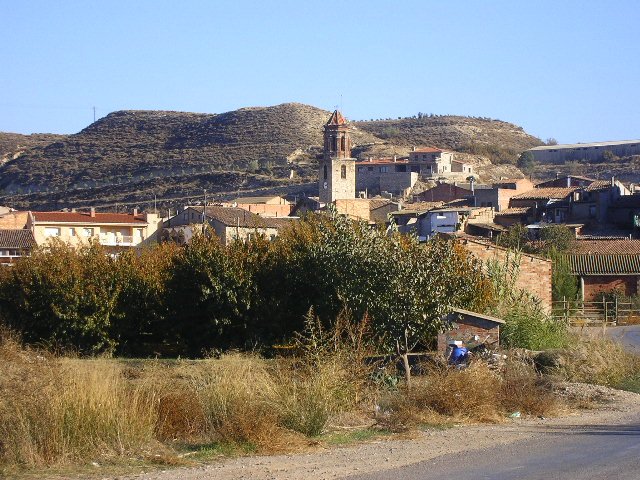

- Coat of arms

- Location in Catalonia
- Coordinates: 41°25′15″N 0°21′13″E
- Country: Spain
- Community: Catalonia
- Province: Lleida
- Comarca: Segrià

Government
  - mayor: Manel Solé Agustí (2015)

Area
  - Total: 38.5 km^{2} (14.9 sq mi)
- Elevation: 78 m (256 ft)

Population (2025-01-01)
  - Total: 994
  - Density: 25.8/km^{2} (66.9/sq mi)
- Demonym(s): granjolí, granjolina
- Postal code: 251023
- Website: granjaescarp.ddl.net

La Granja d'Escarp (Catalan pronunciation: [la ˈɣɾaɲdʒɛ ðesˈkaɾp]) is a municipality in the comarca of the Segrià in Catalonia, Spain.

The town is located at the confluence of the Segre and Cinca rivers.

The monastery of La Granja d'Escarp was founded by Cistercian monks in 1213. La Granja d'Escarp has a population of 994 (register office, 2025), it has lost inhabitants since 1920 when it reached a peak of 1,366 inhabitants. The economy is based on the produce of fruit trees growing in irrigated fields. The area enjoyed some prosperity in the past owing to nearby coal mines.

== See also ==
- Montmeneu
