= Sant Roc d'Amer =

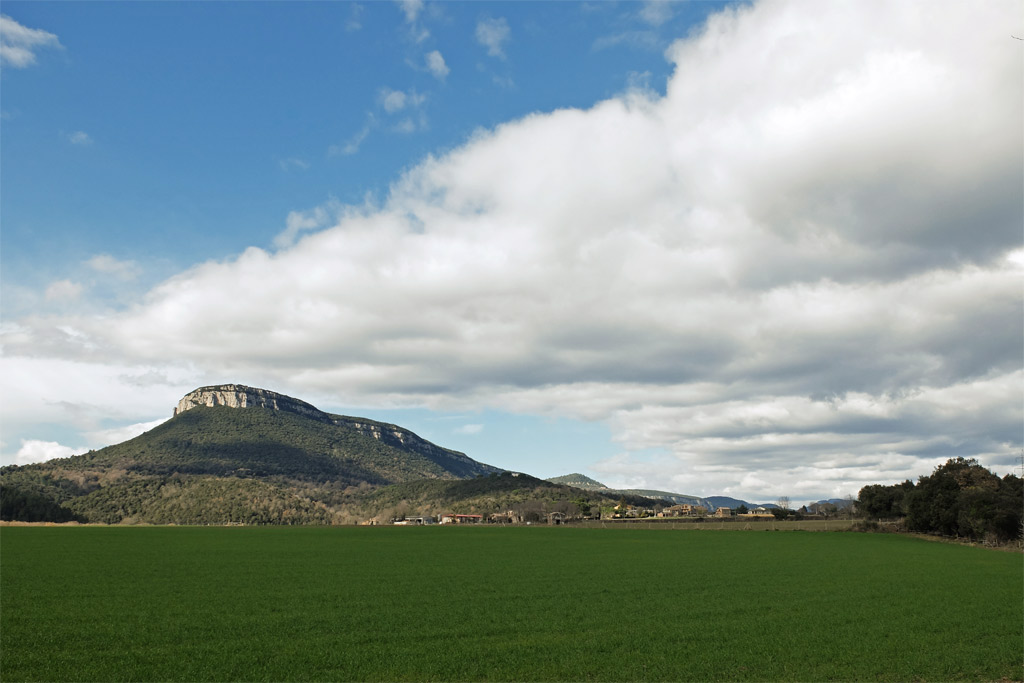
- Sant Roc and the Pla de Sant Joan.

Highest point
- Elevation: 591 m (1,939 ft)
- Coordinates: 42°1′4.08″N 2°39′38.09″E

Geography
- Location: Garrotxa, Gironès, Selva; Catalonia
- Parent range: Catalan Transversal Range

Geology
- Mountain type: Limestone

Climbing
- First ascent: Unknown
- Easiest route: Hike from Sant Climent d'Amer (Amer)

Sant Roc, also known as Sant Roc d'Amer, Sant Roc de la Barroca and Grony, is a mountain of the Catalan Transversal Range, Catalonia, Spain. It has an elevation of 591 metres above sea level. It is part of the range that separates the Llémena River and the Brugent river valleys and is located at the confluence of the Garrotxa (Sant Aniol de Finestres), el Gironès (Sant Martí de Llémena) and la Selva (Sant Julià del Llor i Bonmatí) comarques. This mountain has a striking appearance and is quite visible from the road between Bonmatí and Sant Martí de Llémena. The steep cliffs on the southern and northeastern sides of the mountain are known as Cingles de Sant Roc.

== Historic sites ==
There are paleolithic archaeological sites in different points of the mountain; these are some of the oldest prehistoric sites of the area.

There is also a small church with a Saint Roch shrine on top. This church is known as Ermita de Sant Roc and was mentioned in documents dating from 1447 as the parish church of La Barroca village, located 3 km to the northwest, past the Puig d'Elena mountain.

== See also ==
- Catalan Transversal Range
- Mountains of Catalonia
