= Montmeneu =

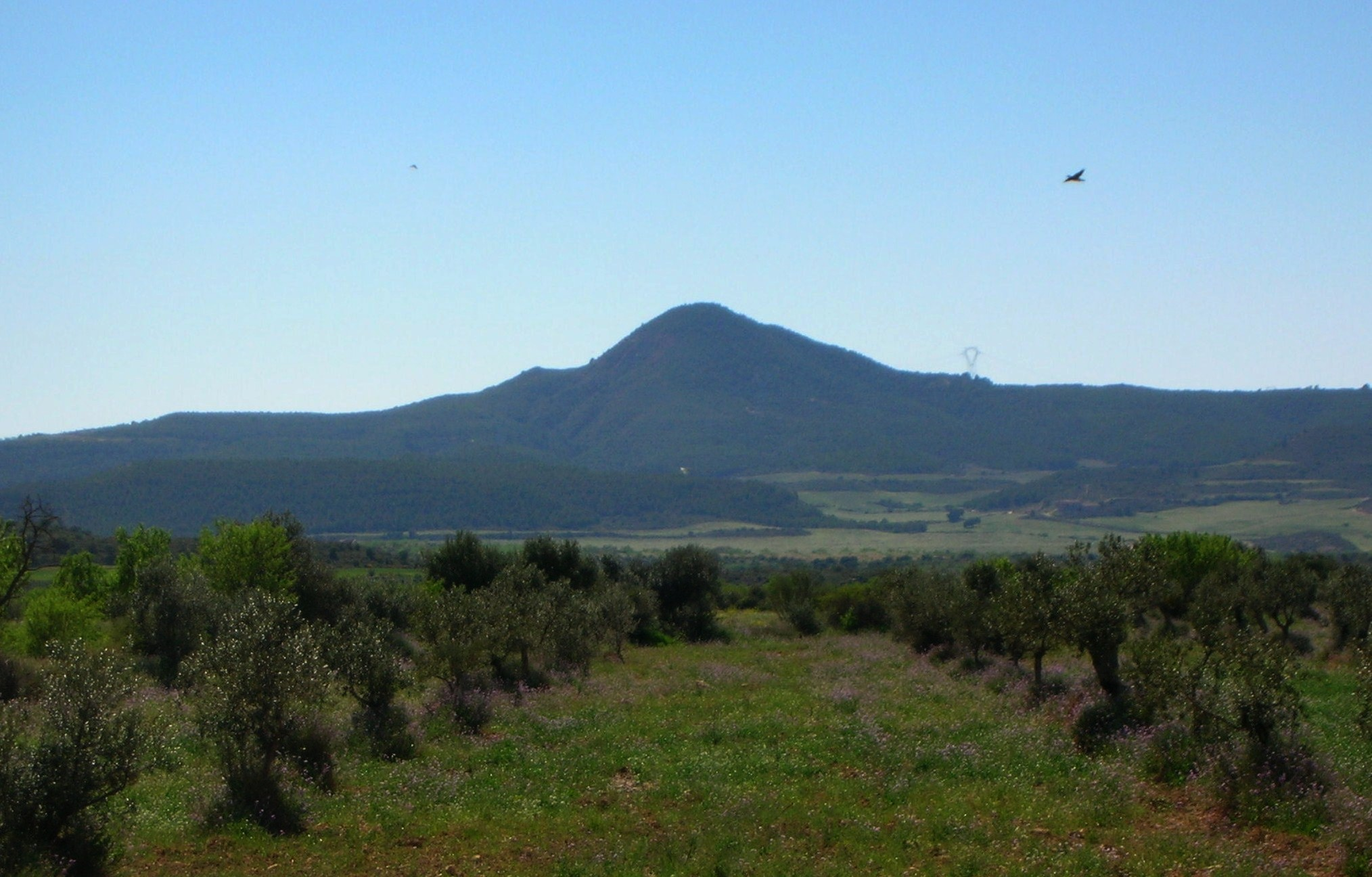

Highest point
- Elevation: 494.63 m (1,622.8 ft)
- Coordinates: 41°23′19″N 0°24′05″E

Geography
- Location within Catalonia
- Location: Segrià, Catalonia
- Parent range: Isolated hill in the Catalan Central Depression

Geology
- Mountain type: Conglomerate

Climbing
- First ascent: Unknown
- Easiest route: From La Granja d'Escarp, Seròs or Maials

Montmeneu (Catalan pronunciation: [mumːəˈnew]) or Punta de Montmaneu is a mountain in Catalonia, Spain. It is located within the La Granja d'Escarp and Seròs municipal limits, Segrià.

== Geography ==
Montmeneu is an isolated hill of the Catalan Central Depression. Since it is surrounded by flat landscape, the mountain is visible over long distances.

There is a triangulation station at the top marked "247126001". Although it is not the highest hill in the region —the Puntal dels Escambrons is 5 m higher— the top offers extensive views of the surrounding landscape.

This mountain is one of the Emblematic summits of Catalonia.

== See also ==
- Mountains of Catalonia
