= Serra dels Pesells =

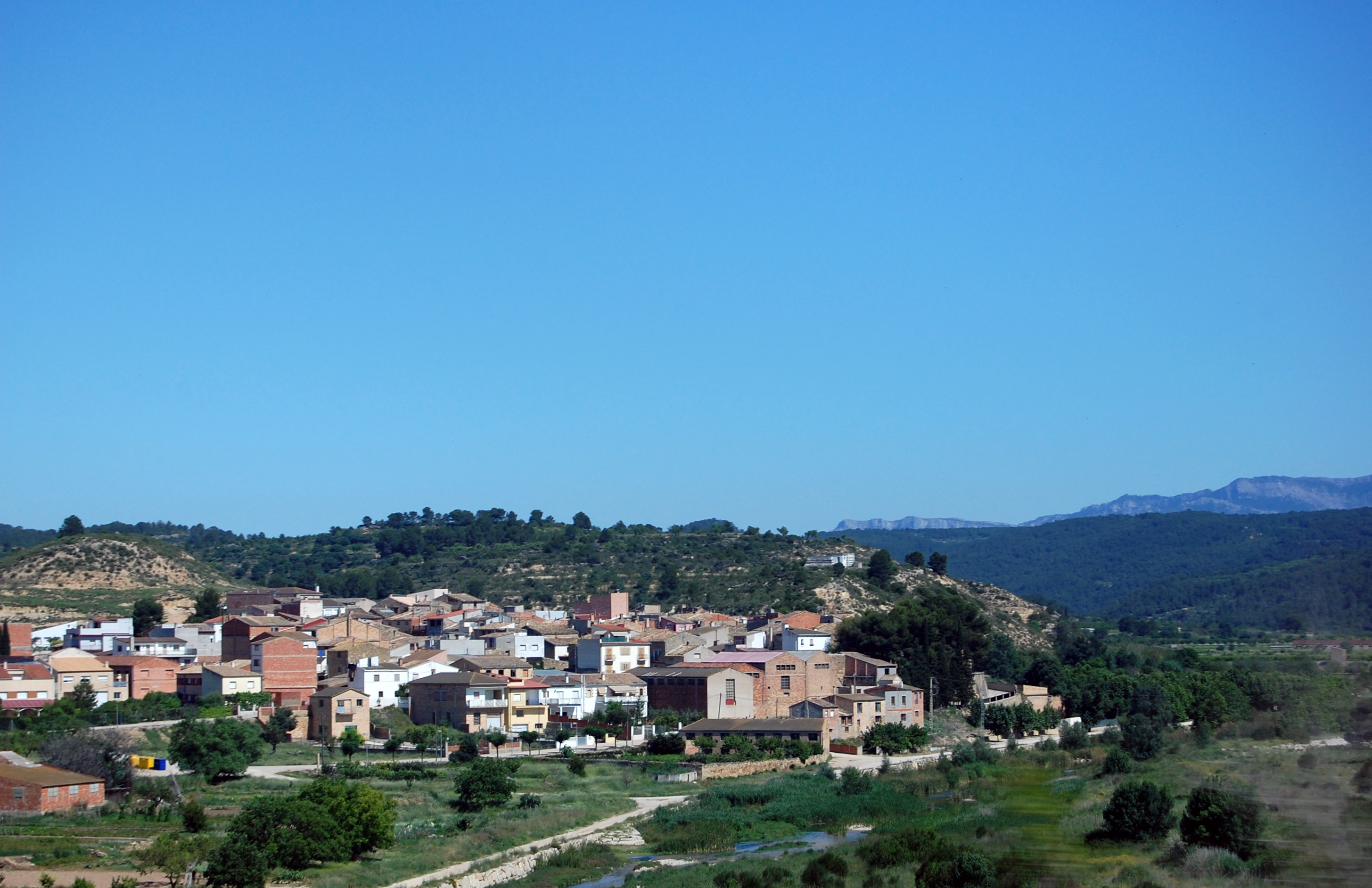
- The Pesells hills rising in the background behind Caseres

Highest point
- Elevation: 541 m (1,775 ft)
- Coordinates: 41°01′3.904″N 0°20′12.10″E

Geography
- Location: Terra Alta (Catalonia)

Geology
- Mountain type: Limestone

Climbing
- Easiest route: Drive from Bot

Serra dels Pesells is a mountain chain located near the southern end of the Catalan Pre-Coastal Range between Bot and Arenys de Lledó. The ridge's highest point is 541,3 m. This smooth range runs in a NNE - SSW direction and divides the basins of the Canaletes and Algars rivers. It is one of the isolated hills of the Catalan Central Depression and it is located at its southwestern end.

Currently wind turbines are being built on top of the Serra dels Pesells ridge. People in nearby Caseres town, who derive some income from rural tourism, are worried that the turbines will mar their picturesque surroundings.

== See also ==
- Catalan Central Depression
