= Vilalba dels Arcs =

- Municipality
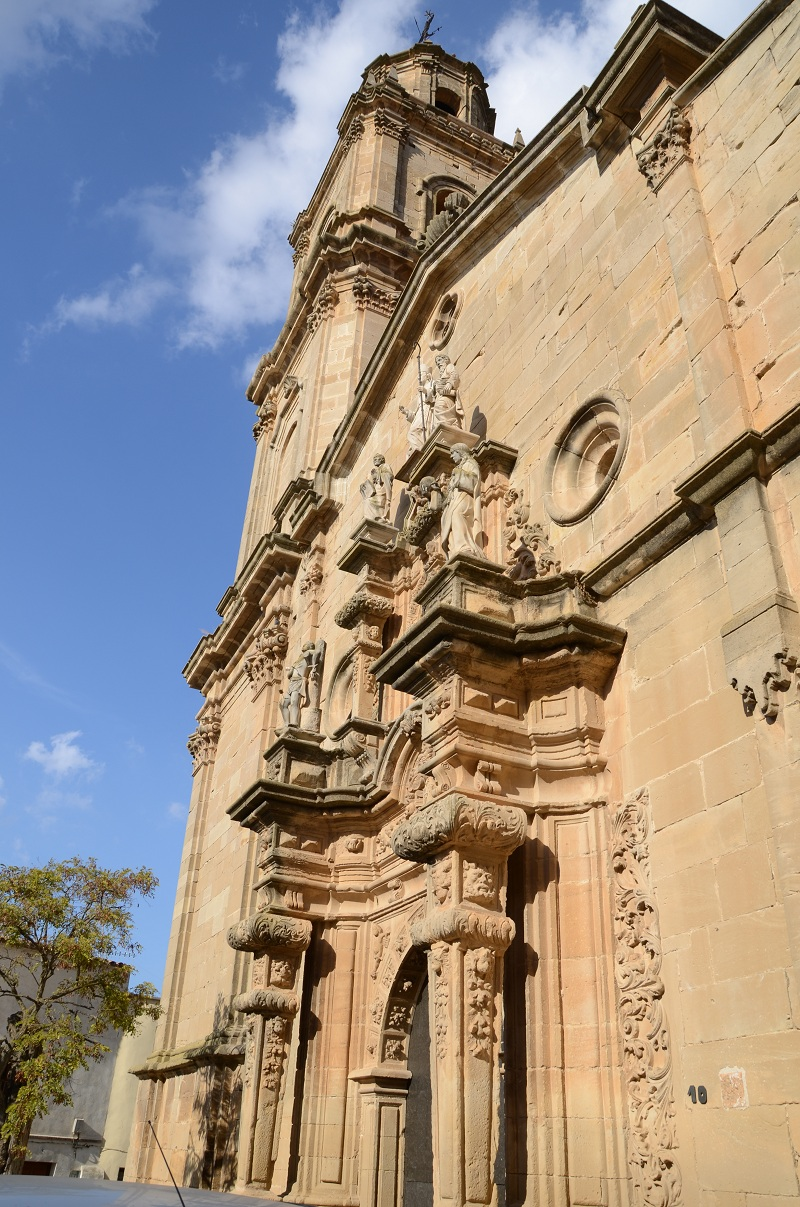
- St. Laurence's parish church

- Coat of arms

- Location in Catalonia
- Coordinates: 41°07′20″N 0°24′39″E
- Country: Spain
- Community: Catalonia
- Province: Tarragona
- Comarca: Terra Alta

Government
  - Mayor: Maria Teresa Mariné Solé (2015)

Area
  - Total: 67.2 km^{2} (25.9 sq mi)
- Elevation: 450 m (1,480 ft)

Population (2025-01-01)
  - Total: 611
  - Density: 9.09/km^{2} (23.5/sq mi)
- Postal code: 43175
- Climate: Csa
- Website: www.vilalba.altanet.org

Vilalba dels Arcs (Catalan pronunciation: [biˈlalβa ðelz ˈaɾks]) is a municipality in the comarca of Terra Alta in Catalonia, Spain. It has a population of 611 (register office, 2025).

This town is located in a wine-producing area. The area suffered much during the Battle of the Ebro. At the site known as Els Barrancs there are still almost intact trenches of the Spanish Republican line of defence, part of a long defensive line built between Vilalba dels Arcs and La Pobla de Massaluca.
