= La Pobla de Massaluca =

- Municipality
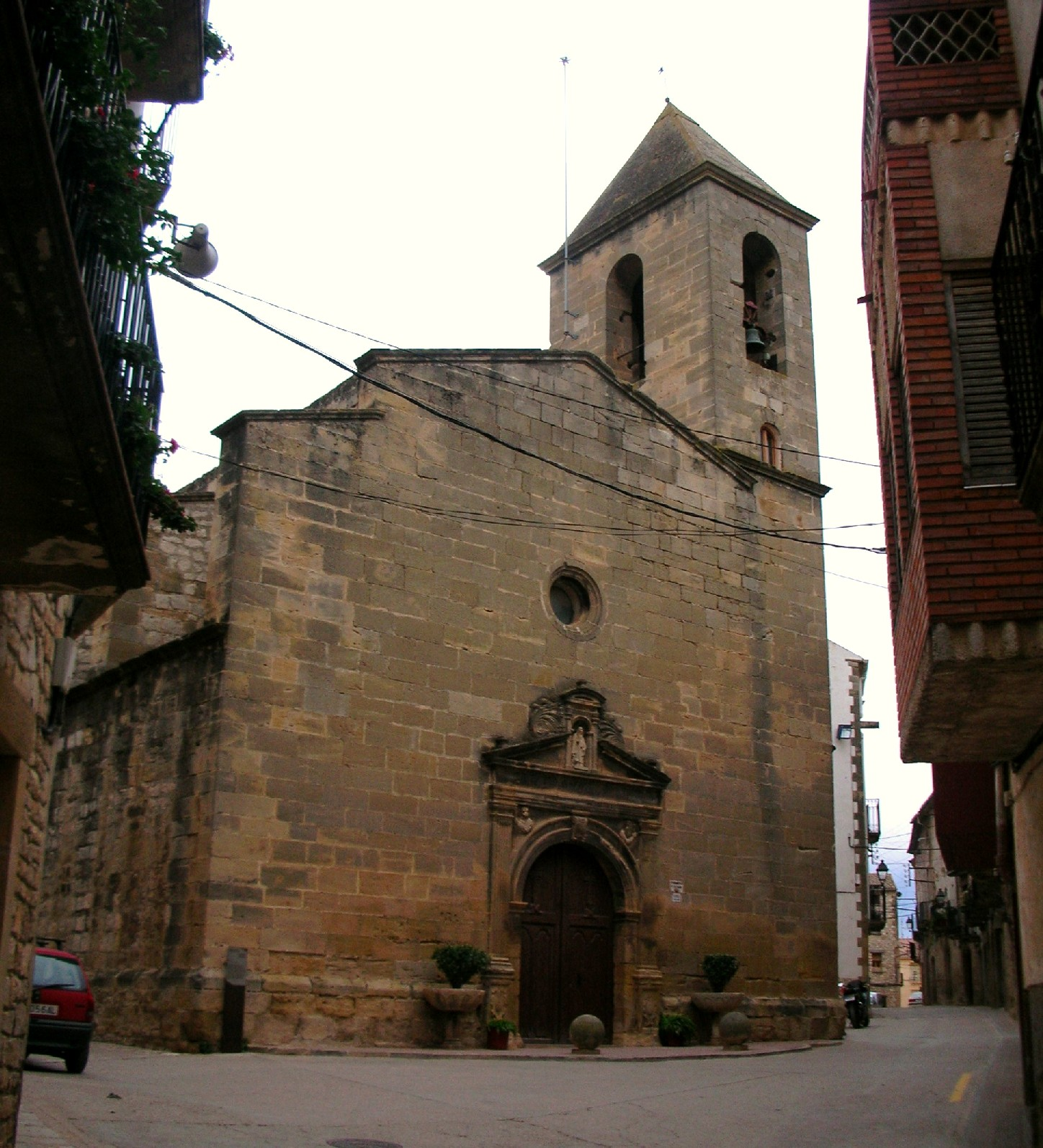

- Coat of arms

- Location in Catalonia
- Coordinates: 41°10′59″N 0°21′18″E
- Country: Spain
- Community: Catalonia
- Province: Tarragona
- Comarca: Terra Alta

Government
  - mayor: Marc de Barcelona (2015)

Area
  - Total: 43.4 km^{2} (16.8 sq mi)
- Elevation: 5,422,313,123 m (1.7789741217×10^{10} ft)

Population (2025-01-01)
  - Total: 344
  - Density: 7.93/km^{2} (20.5/sq mi)
- Postal code: 43110
- Climate: Csa
- Website: www.poblamassaluca.altanet.org

La Pobla de Massaluca (Catalan pronunciation: [la ˈpoβla ðe masaˈluka]) is a municipality in the comarca of la Terra Alta in Catalonia, Spain. It has a population of 344 (register office, 2025).

The present town originated in 1294 according to existing documents, but it does not match the present location of the village. It is believed that it was formerly known as 'Pobla de Vilabona'. The town belonged from 1531 onwards to the Knights Hospitaller order, which had the see in neighboring Vilalba dels Arcs.

La Pobla de Massaluca produces olive oil. The local wine also deserves special mention.
