= Bot, Spain =

Bot
- Municipality
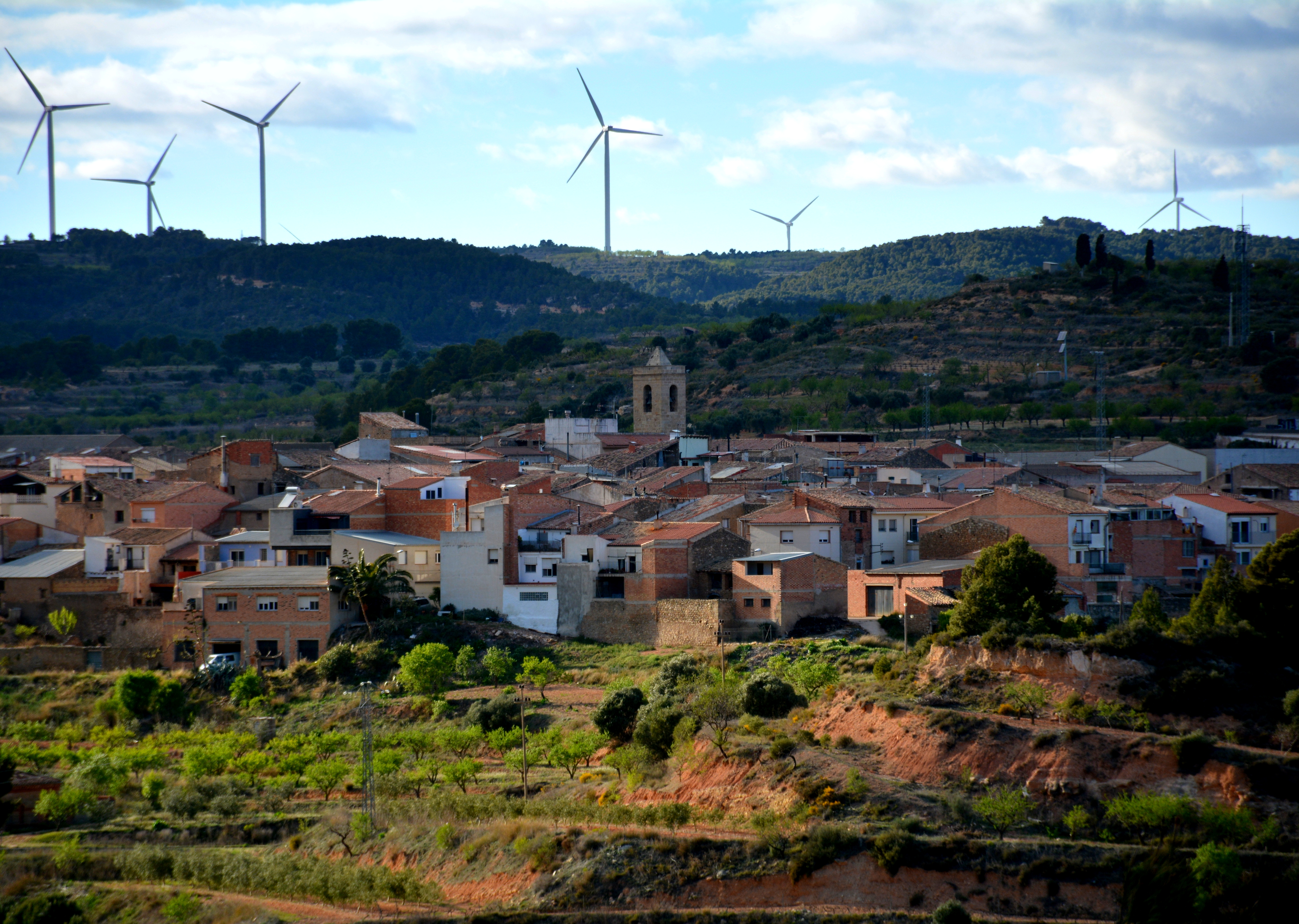
- General view of Bot

- Location in Catalonia
- Coordinates: 41°0′N 0°23′E
- Country: Spain
- Community: Catalonia
- Province: Tarragona
- Comarca: Terra Alta

Government
  - Alcalde: Núria Mulet Mulet

Area
  - Total: 34.9 km^{2} (13.5 sq mi)

Population (2025-01-01)
  - Total: 548
  - Density: 15.7/km^{2} (40.7/sq mi)
- Climate: Csa
- Website: www.bot.altanet.org

Bot (Catalan pronunciation: [ˈbɔt]) is a town located in the comarca of Terra Alta, province of Tarragona, in Catalonia, Spain. It is located between the Serra de la Solsida and the Serra dels Pesells ranges. It has a population of 548 (register office, 2025).

The people in the town of Bot have been traditionally engaged in wine production.

There was a Renfe railway line from Tortosa to Alcañiz and Zaragoza that used to pass through Bot until 1973. This line was dismantled as a result of a 1962 World Bank report advising the Spanish State to concentrate investment in the great lines and to abandon the less profitable railways connecting rural areas. Since the line was terminated, the rails were pulled off and the Bot train station buildings lie abandoned. The train was affectionately known as "el tramvia" (the tramway) by locals.
