= Seròs =

- Municipality
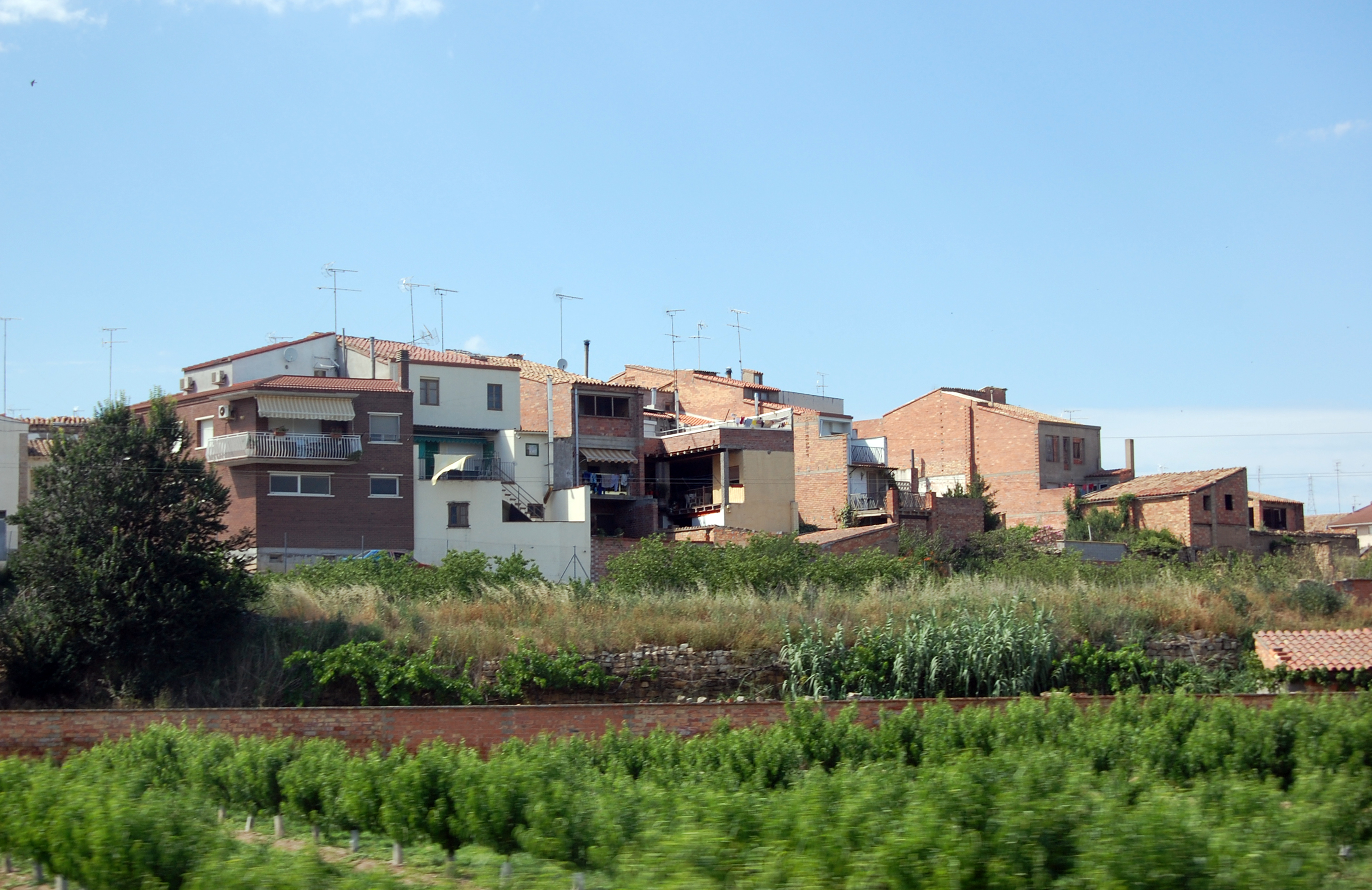

- Coat of arms

- Location in Catalonia
- Coordinates: 41°27′55″N 0°24′42″E
- Province: Lleida
- Comarca: Segrià

Government
  - Mayor: Josep Antoni Romia Pujol (2019)

Area
  - Total: 85.8 km^{2} (33.1 sq mi)
- Elevation: 103 m (338 ft)

Population (2025-01-01)
  - Total: 1,954
  - Density: 22.8/km^{2} (59.0/sq mi)
- Demonym(s): Seronenc, seronenca Serossà, serossana
- Website: seros.cat

Seròs (Catalan pronunciation: [seˈɾɔs]) is a municipality in the comarca of the Segrià in Catalonia, Spain. It is situated on the right bank of the Segre river in the south-west of the comarca. The Aragon and Catalonia canal provides irrigation water for growing fruit. The municipality is linked to the rest of the comarca and to Fraga (comarca of Baix Cinca, Aragon) by the C-242 road.

== Demography ==
It has a population of 1,954 (register office, 2025).

1900	1930	1950	1970	1986	2007
779	878	1030	976	871	1893

== See also ==
- Montmeneu
