= Catalan Transversal Range =

Coordinates: 41°55′N 2°33′E

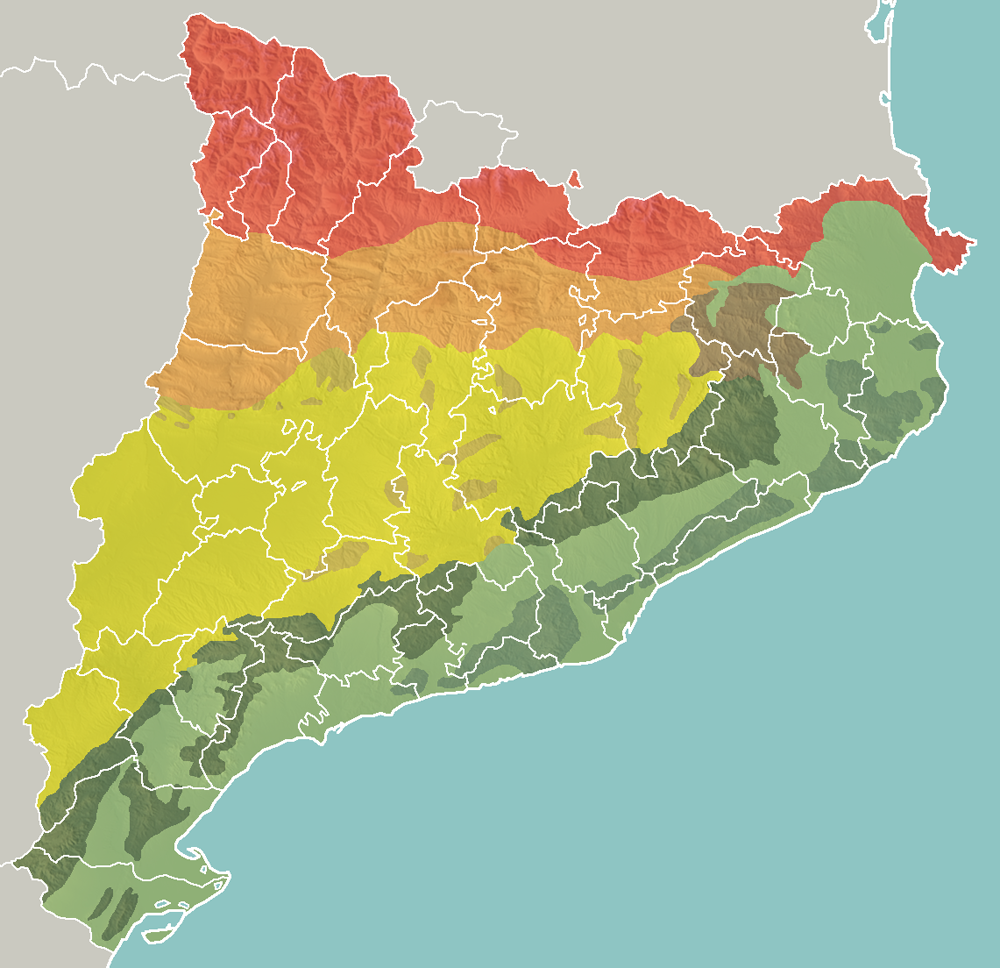
Geomorphologic map of Catalonia: Pyrenees; Pre-Pyrenees; Catalan Central Depression; Smaller mountain ranges of the Central Depression; Catalan Transversal Range; Catalan Pre-Coastal Range; Catalan Coastal Range; Catalan Coastal Depression and other coastal and pre-coastal plains

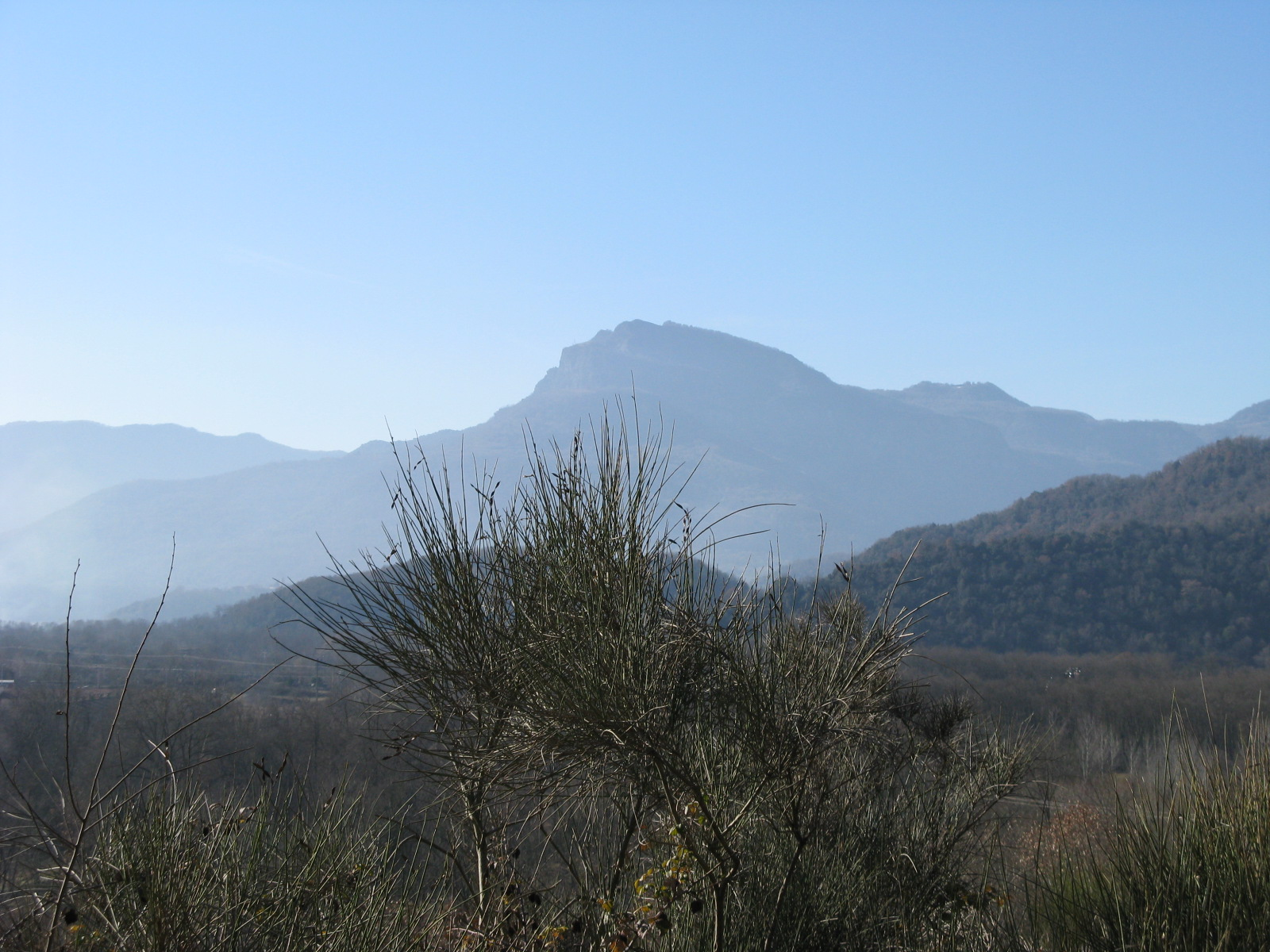
331 m high Puig de Santa Magdalena, Baixa Garrotxa, is part of the Catalan Transversal Range

The Catalan Transversal Range (Serralada Transversal) is a system of minor mountain ranges at the eastern end of the Pre-Pyrenees, between the Osona and Garrotxa comarques. The existence of the Catalan Transversal Range has made communications in the northern areas of Catalonia difficult in the past, especially between Northeastern Catalonia (Catalan Coastal Depression, with cities like Girona, Figueres and La Jonquera) and Western Catalonia (Catalan Mediterranean System; Lleida, Cervera and further west to Aragón), a problem that has been partly solved with the development of the Eix Transversal.

== Description ==
The Catalan Transversal Range is made up of a series of mountains running in a NW / SE axis between the Pyrenees, the Sub-Pyrenees, the Catalan Pre-Coastal Range and the northern end of the Catalan Coastal Depression. The highest point is at Puigsacalm, 1.515 m.

Its most characteristic feature is a small region of volcanic origin near Olot, Garrotxa. There are extinct volcanoes like the conical-shaped Santa Margarida and Croscat, as well as basalt masses that originated in ancient lava flows at Castellfollit de la Roca.

== Main mountain ranges ==
- Puigsacalm (1.515 m)
- Pla d'Aiats (1.306 m)
- El Far (1.111 m)
- Finestres (1.027 m)
- Sant Roc (591 m)

== See also ==
- Eix Transversal
- Catalan Coastal Depression
- Catalan Pre-Coastal Range
- Pyrenees
- Sub-Pyrenees
