= Puigsacalm =

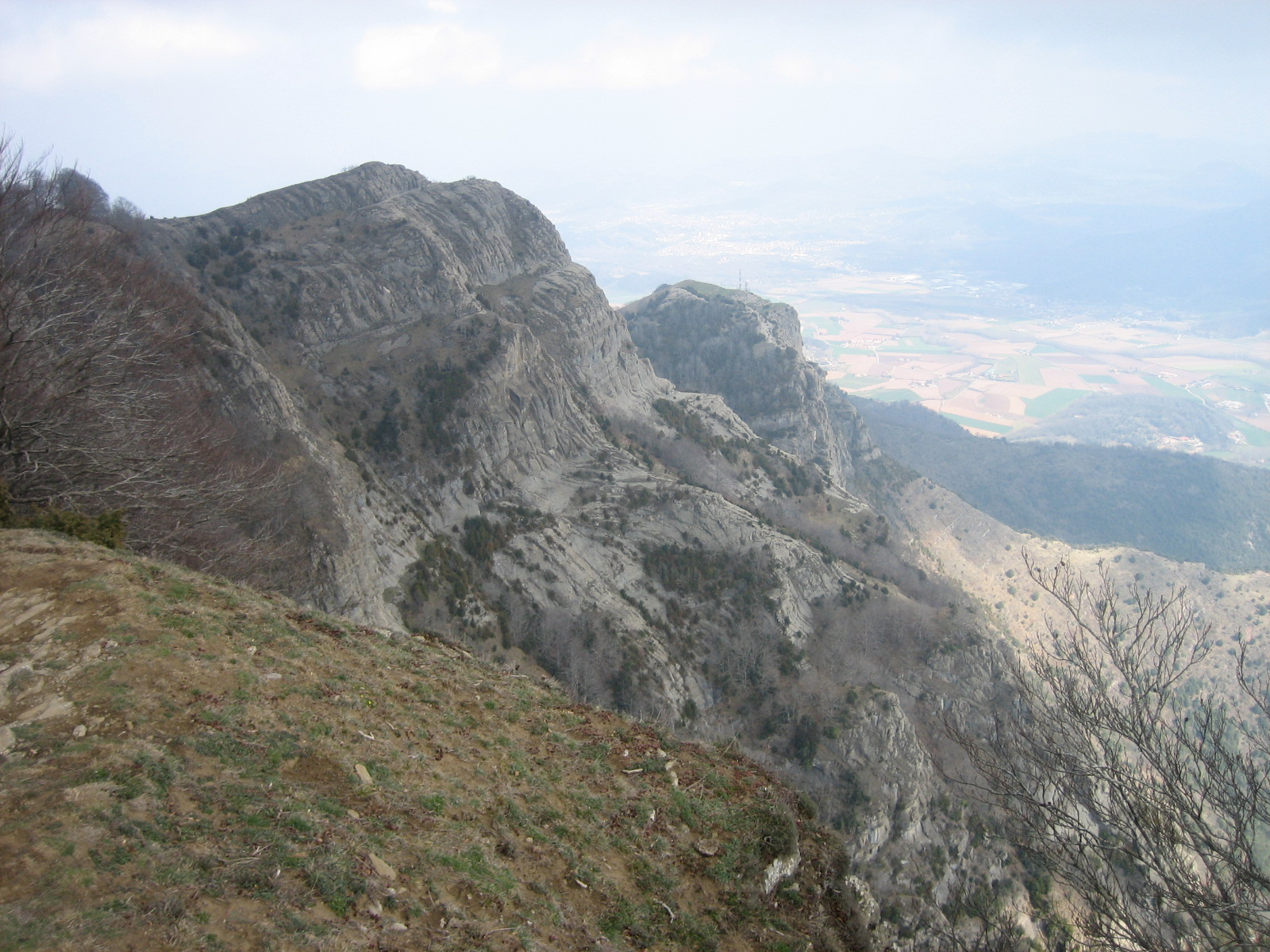

Highest point
- Elevation: 1,512 m (4,961 ft)
- Coordinates: 42°7′30.40″N 2°23′16.56″E

Geography
- Location: Vall d'en Bas, Catalonia
- Parent range: Catalan Transversal Range

Puigsacalm is the highest mountain of the Catalan Transversal Range, Catalonia, Spain. It has an elevation of 1,512 metres above sea level.

== See also ==
- Catalan Transversal Range
- Mountains of Catalonia
