= Caseres =

Municipality in Spain

- Municipality
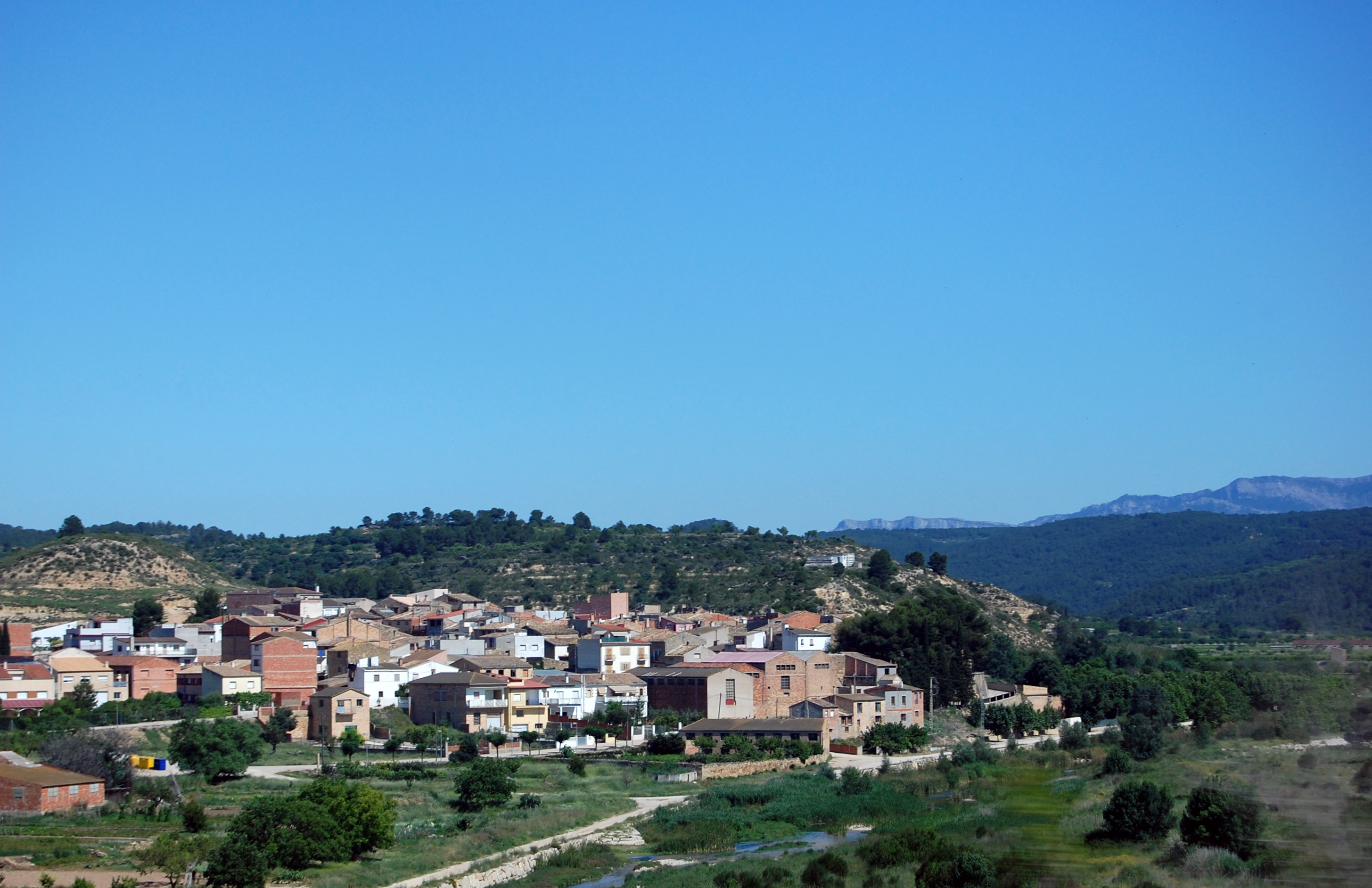

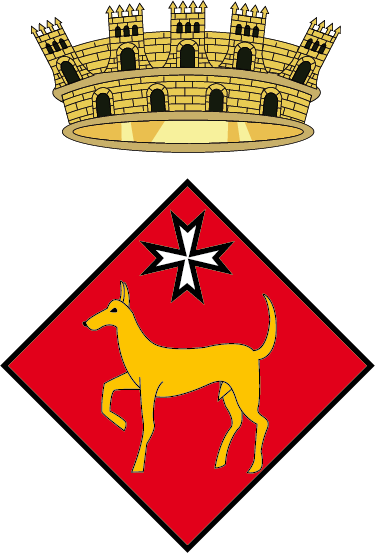
- Coat of arms

- Location in Catalonia
- Coordinates: 41°02′28″N 0°15′08″E
- Country: Spain
- Community: Catalonia
- Province: Tarragona
- Comarca: Terra Alta

Government
  - mayor: Manel Palau González (2015)

Area
  - Total: 42.9 km^{2} (16.6 sq mi)
- Elevation: 324 m (1,063 ft)

Population (2025-01-01)
  - Total: 250
  - Density: 5.8/km^{2} (15/sq mi)
- Postal code: 43787
- Climate: Csa
- Website: www.caseres.altanet.org

Caseres (Catalan pronunciation: [kaˈzeɾes]) is a municipality in the comarca of la Terra Alta in Catalonia, Spain. It has a population of 250 (register office, 2025).

This town is located in picturesque surroundings, but many wind turbines are being constructed in the Serra dels Pesells hills nearby. The name of the village appears already in 1153 in documents of the Miravet castle, which belonged at that time to the Knights Templar order, and later to the Knights Hospitaller in 1359.

Presently, the town derives some income from rural tourism.
