= Biscotti regina =

Small Italian biscuits

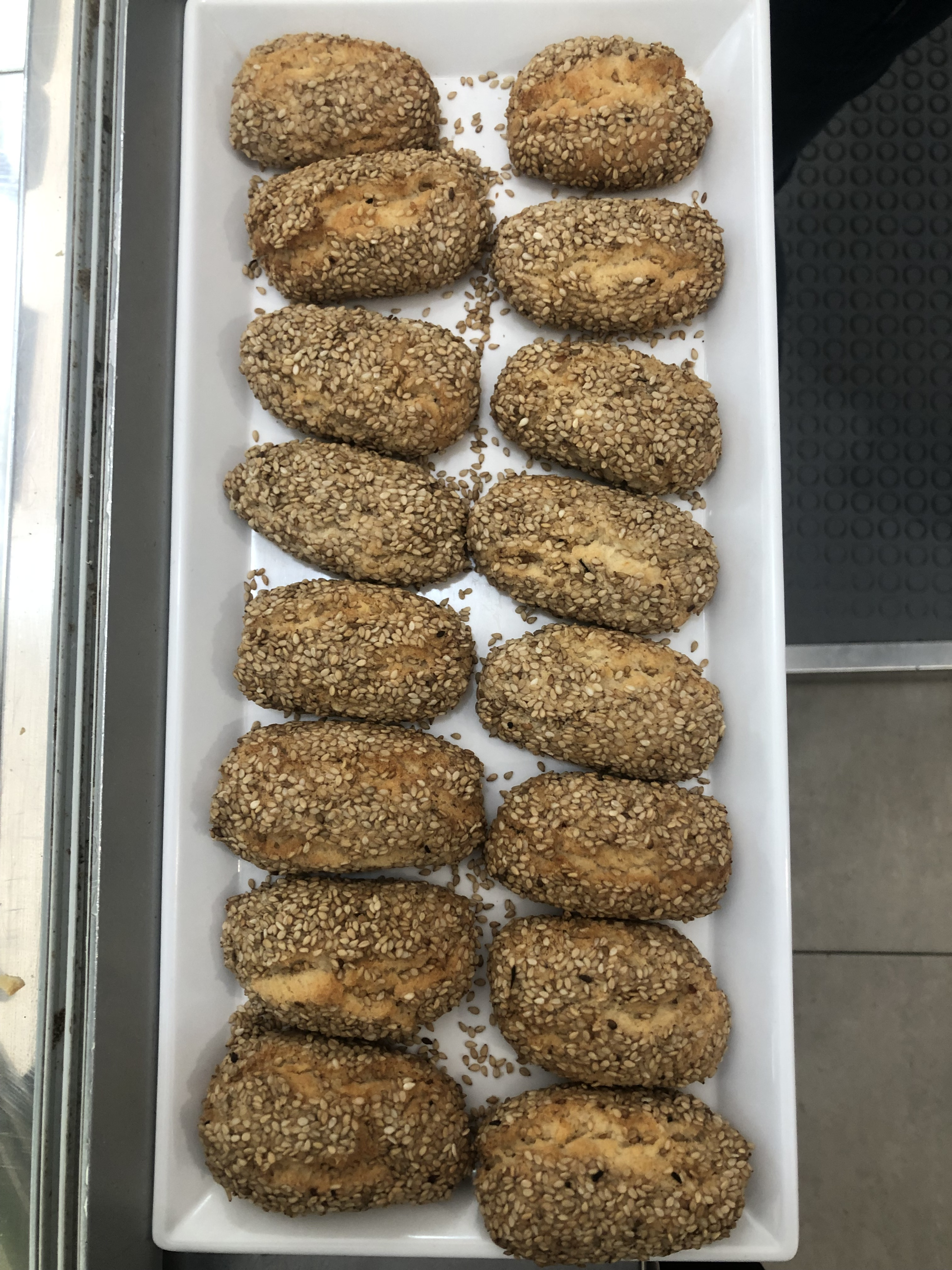
- Type: Biscuit
- Place of origin: Italy
- Region or state: Palermo, Sicily
- Main ingredients: Sesame seeds

Biscotti regina (lit. 'queen biscuits'), also known as reginelle, are small Sicilian biscuits coated with sesame seeds. They are typical of the province of Palermo but are also widespread in other Sicilian provinces. These pastries taste halfway between sweet and salty (savoury).

== See also ==
- List of Italian desserts and pastries
- Biscotti
- Biscuit
