= Catalan Central Depression =

Depression in Catalonia

Coordinates: 41°50′00″N 1°11′00″E

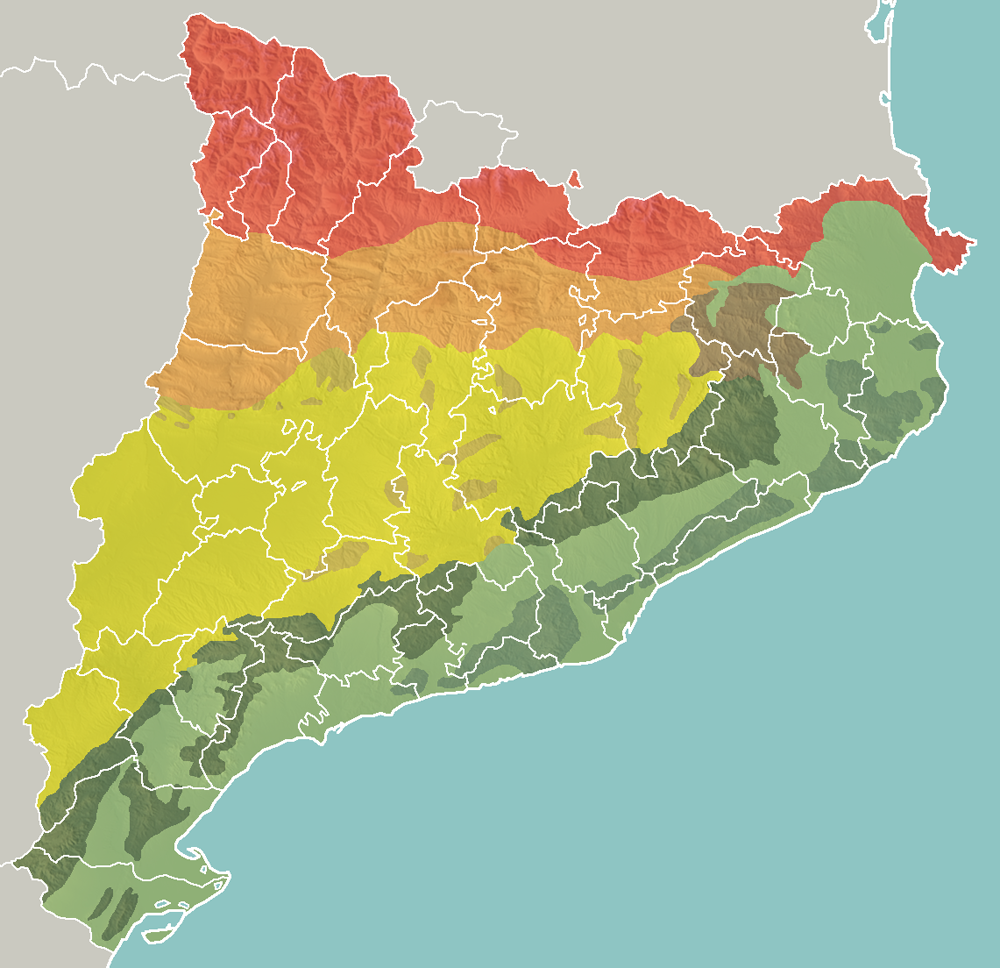
Geomorphologic map of Catalonia: Pyrenees; Pre-Pyrenees; Catalan Central Depression; Mountain ranges of the Central Depression; Catalan Transversal Range; Catalan Pre-Coastal Range; Catalan Coastal Range; Catalan Coastal Depression and other coastal and pre-coastal plains

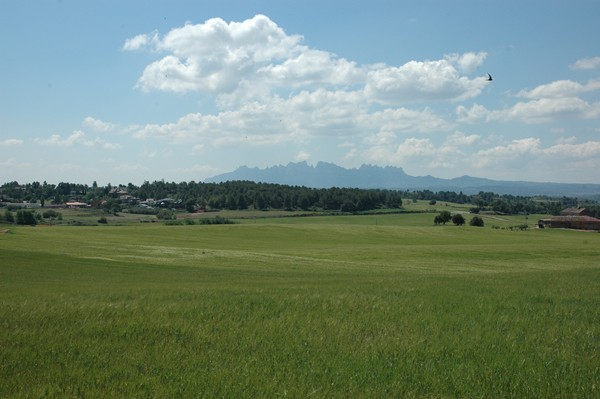
The Pla de Bages, in the midst of the Central Depression, with Montserrat in the background.

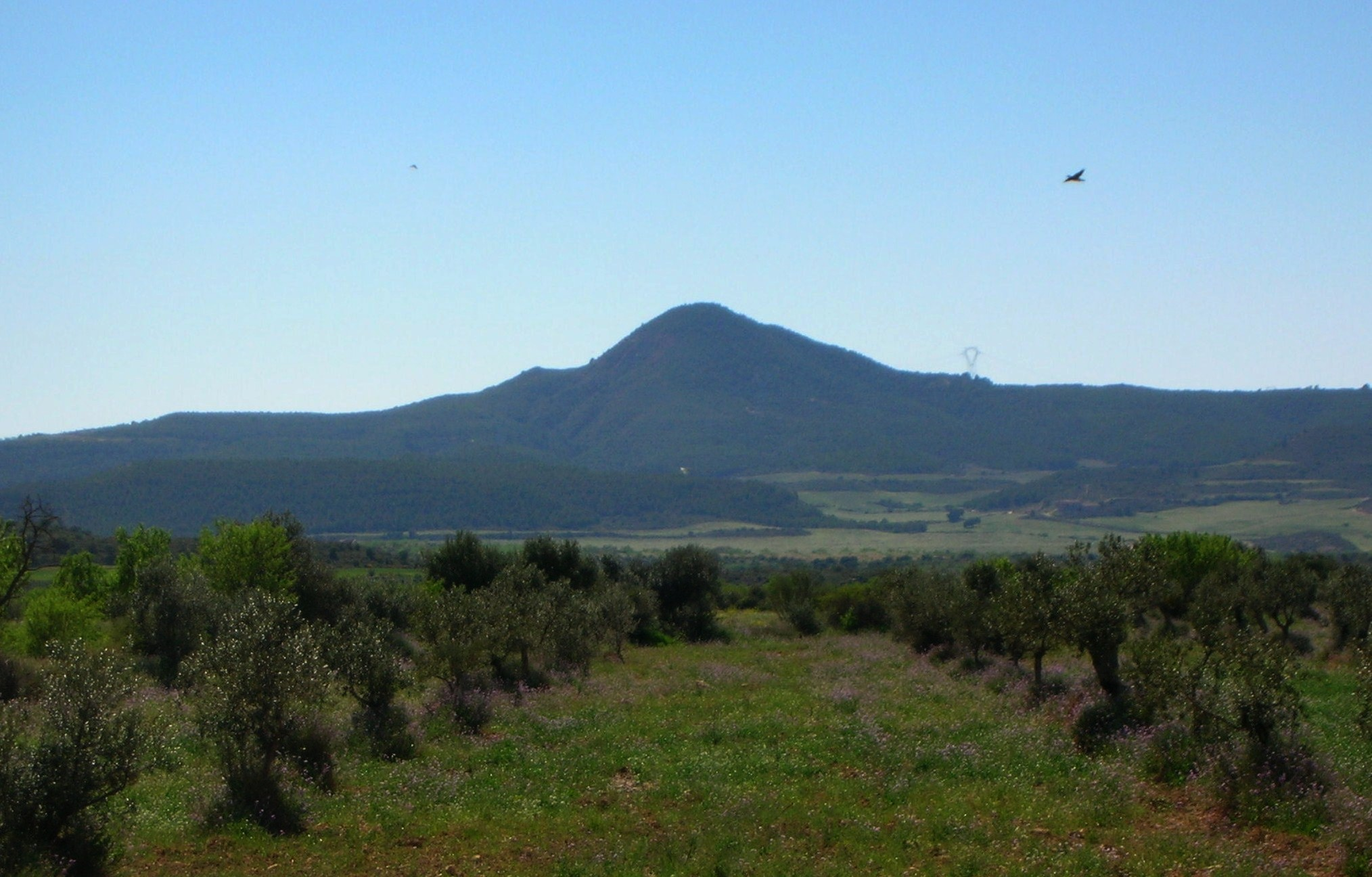
The Montmeneu, an isolated hill in the western area of the Central Depression.

The Catalan Central Depression (Catalan: Depressió Central Catalana) is a natural depression between the Pre-Pyrenees and the Catalan Pre-Coastal Range in Spain. It widens towards the west, linking with the Ebro Depression, Catalan: Depressió de l'Ebre, of which it could be considered an eastern extension. The Catalan Central Depression is about 180 km long with an average width of 50 km.

== Description ==
The Catalan Central Depression consists of a succession of high plateaus between 800 and 1,000 metres in altitude that gradually lose height westwards until the Ebro Depression. There are eroded river basins limiting these heights wherever the ground is made up of clay or marlstone. The Pla de Bages and the Conca de Barberà are examples of these higher regions.

The limits of the Central Depression are different whether considered from the point of view of their origin or their actual relief. Some mountain ranges outside of the depression, like Montserrat and Sant Llorenç del Munt, are formed by the same geologic materials that make up the Central Depression, even though geographically they are situated in the Pre-Coastal Range. These materials were piled up over the more ancient rocks of the Catalan Mediterranean System.

The Central Depression formed in the Tertiary, when a great gulf, that later became a sea, had its boundaries in the Pyrenees and the Catalan-Balearic Massif. Marine sedimentation formed clay, and other limestone materials, like bluish marl where the sedimentation had been part of a quiet and slow process, as well as conglomerate in the areas of the mouths of ancient rivers coming down from the Pyrenees and the former Catalan-Balearic Massif. Evaporation produced sodium and potassium salts, as well as gypsum in certain areas.

== Mountain ranges ==
Some minor mountain ranges are scattered within the Central Depression without a regular pattern. The main ones are:

- Serrat Gran de Postius
- Serrat de la Minyona
- Serrat de la Rodoreda
- Serra de Castelltallat
- Serra de Pinós
- Serra de Brufaganya
- Serra de Palomes
- Serra de Rubió
- Serra d'Almenara
- Serra de Sant Miquel
- Punta d'Ossós
- Muntanya de Sant Mamet
- Mont-Roig
- Serra Carbonera
- Serra d'Oliana
- Serra del Tallat
- Serra de Vilobí
- Montmeneu
- Serra de Matalescabres
- Serra de la Fatarella
- Serra dels Pesells

== See also ==
- Catalan Coastal Depression
- Catalan Pre-Coastal Range
