= Bateidae =

Scientific classification
- Kingdom: Animalia
- Phylum: Arthropoda
- Clade: Pancrustacea
- Class: Malacostraca
- Order: Amphipoda
- Parvorder: Eusiridira
- Superfamily: Eusiroidea
- Family: Bateidae; Stebbing, 1906
- Genus: Batea; Müller, 1865

Type species
- Batea catharinensis Müller, 1865

Synonyms
- Carinobatea Shoemaker, 1926

Family of crustaceans

Bateidae is a family of amphipod crustaceans, comprising the single genus Batea, which in turn contains thirteen species:

- Batea bousfieldi (Ortiz, 1991)
- Batea campi (Ortiz, 1991)
- Batea carinata (Shoemaker, 1926)
- Batea catharinensis Müller, 1865
- Batea conductor (J. L. Barnard, 1969)
- Batea coyoa (J. L. Barnard, 1969)
- Batea cuspidata (Shoemaker, 1926)
- Batea intermedia Serejo, 2007
- Batea lobata Shoemaker, 1926
- Batea rectangulata Shoemaker, 1925
- Batea schotti Ortiz & Lemaitre, 1997
- Batea susurrator J. L. Barnard, 1969
- Batea transversa Shoemaker, 1926
