= Horta de Sant Joan =

- Municipality
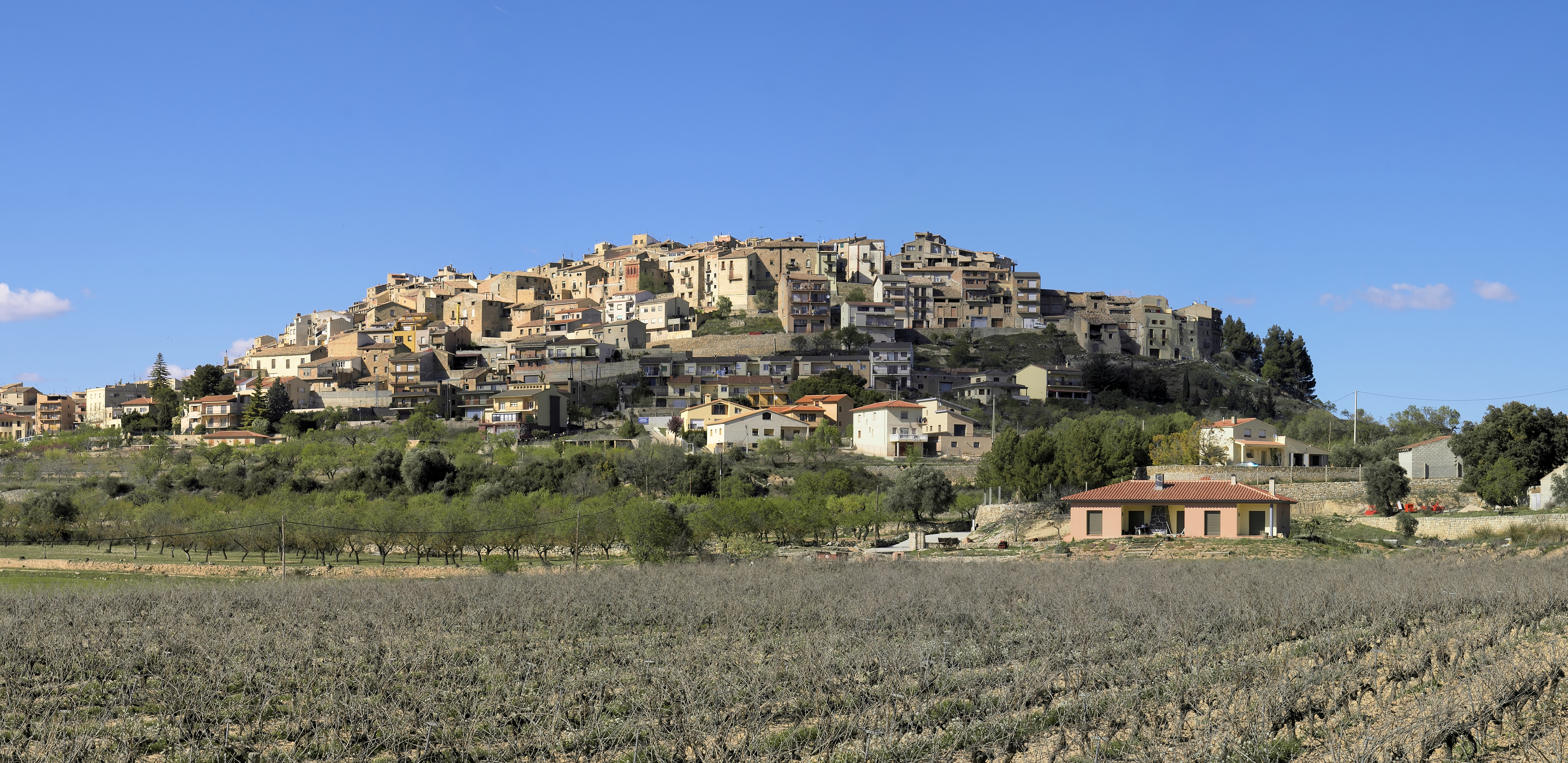
- Horta de Sant Joan

- Flag Coat of arms

- Location in Catalonia Horta de Sant Joan (Spain)
- Coordinates: 40°57′23″N 0°18′59″E
- Country: Spain
- Autonomous community: Catalonia
- Province: Tarragona
- Comarca: Terra Alta

Government
  - mayor: Joaquim Ferràs Prats (2015)

Area
  - Total: 119.0 km^{2} (45.9 sq mi)
- Elevation: 542 m (1,778 ft)

Population (2025-01-01)
  - Total: 1,150
  - Density: 9.66/km^{2} (25.0/sq mi)
- Postal code: 43071
- Climate: Csa
- Website: www.hortadesantjoan.cat

Horta de Sant Joan (Catalan pronunciation: [ˈɔɾta ðe ˈsaɲ dʒuˈan]) is a village and municipality in comarca of Terra Alta in Catalonia, Spain. It has a population of 1,150 (register office, 2025).

Pablo Picasso spent a year in this town and developed a considerable amount of his artistic skills in the town.

== History ==
Because of its location on a small hill with a natural spring near the top, Horta has been inhabited for centuries. It was a great advantage during medieval sieges, to not be forced to get water from the rivers outside of town. The earliest inhabitants were Iberians, who lived in the area until the arrival of the Romans. In the 8th century Horta, like most of Spain, was under Muslim rule, then reconquered by Christians in the 12th Century. There are still olive trees, like the 1,000-year-old Parot, that were planted by the Muslims during their 400-year rule.

Horta de Sant Joan is the birthplace of Manuel Pallarès, friend and companion of Pablo Picasso. Picasso spent some time in Horta during his youth (1897–98) with his friend Manuel. He is quoted as having said, "Everything I know I learned in Horta". Picasso later returned to develop his Proto-Cubism style of painting (1909). During both visits he made many paintings and drawings. There is a Centro Picasso (Picasso Center) that organizes expositions, symposiums, and publications about the artist. There is also an Eco-Museum of the Natural Park of the Ports, and a visitor center with maps and hotel information.

== Geography ==
Horta de Sant Joan, sometimes called Horta, is located on a hill with a view of the landscape of the northwestern foothills of the mountain range called the Ports of Beceite. The Saint Salvador d'Horta monastery, also known as Convent of Angels, is located at the foot of the Santa Barbara Mountain.

The rock formations called Benet's Rocks are located within Horta de Sant Joan's municipal area. Benet's Rocks form the most characteristic overall landscape in the northern section of the mountain range. Of the three large rock forms, the left-most one is referred to as the Dog's Head because when viewed from the side it strongly resembles that form.

Much of Horta de Sant Joan is within the Natural Park of the Ports of Beseite. The area outside the park boundaries is mostly agricultural, with large tracts of olive, almond, and fruit trees, as well as vineyards.

There are three major rivers crossing the area around Horta. The river Algars to the west forms the boundary between Catalonia (comarca of Terra Alta) and Aragon (comarca of Matarraña). The second river, Estrets, is to the west and is a tributary of the river Algars. The river Canaletes, to the north, later joins the largest river in Spain, the Ebro.

== Climate ==
Horta de Sant Joan has an Interior Mediterranean climate, with very cold winters and extremely hot summers. The area benefits from the Ports Mountain range, which traps cooler sea air from the coast and brings a natural form of "air conditioning" in the evenings in the summer called the Garbi for the winds from the east by that name.

== Economy ==
With the natural park surrounding it, Horta's economy is mainly based around agriculture, with tourism also being a factor in the economy.

== Notable people ==
- Gerard Badía (born 18 October 1989), Spanish footballer
