= Catalan Coastal Depression =

Coordinates: 41°28′58″N 02°16′54″E

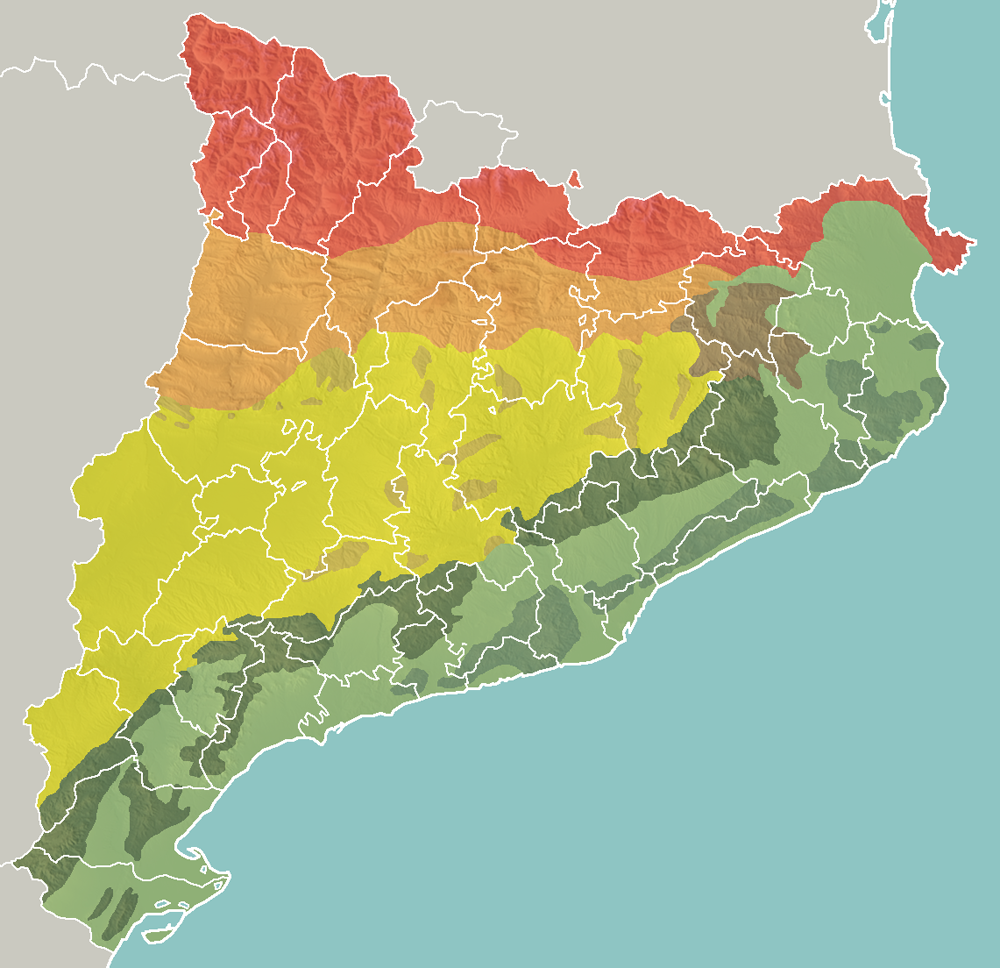
Geomorphologic map of Catalonia: Pyrenees; Pre-Pyrenees; Catalan Central Depression; Smaller mountain ranges of the Central Depression; Catalan Transversal Range; Catalan Pre-Coastal Range; Catalan Coastal Range; Catalan Coastal Depression and other coastal and pre-coastal plains

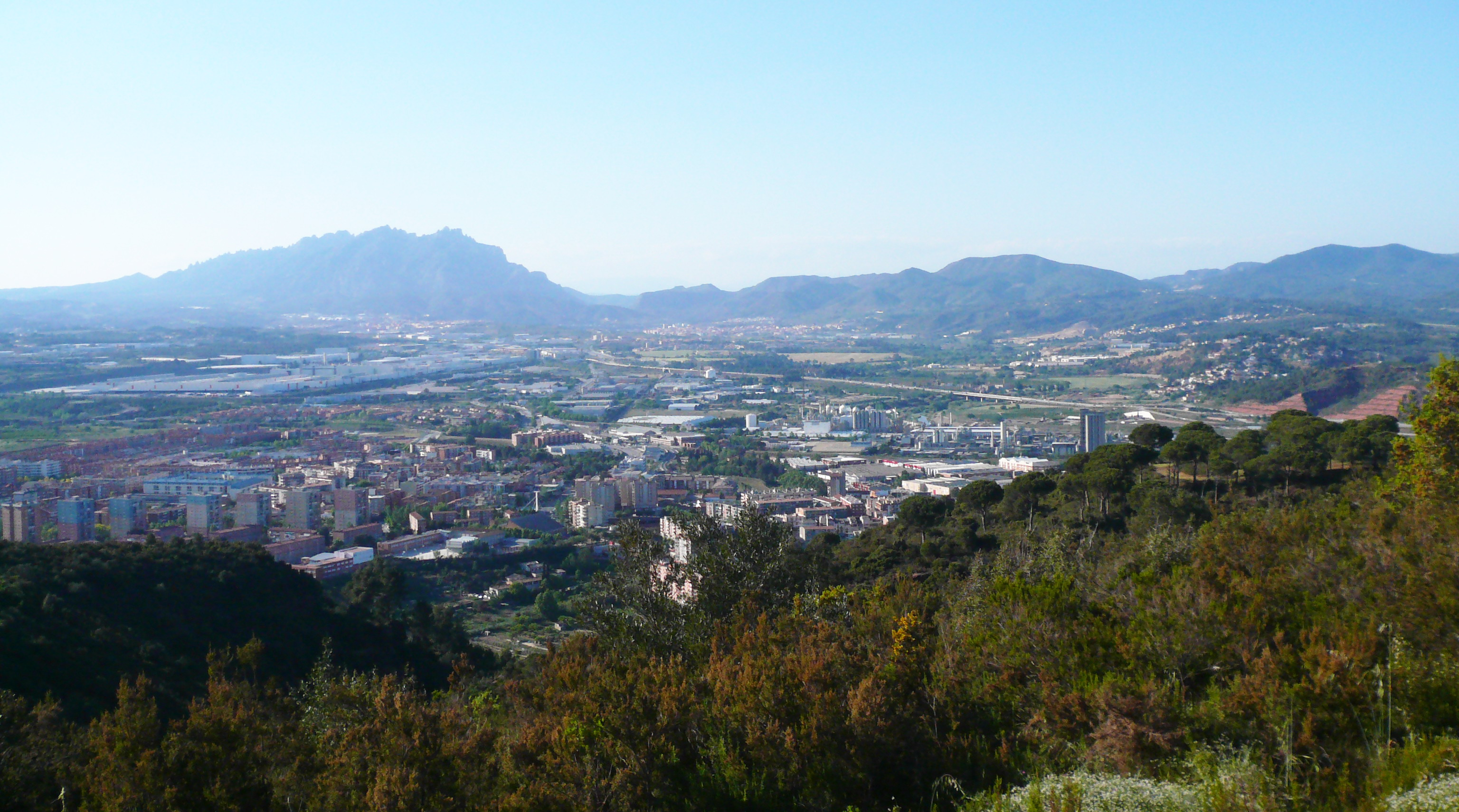
The Catalan Coastal Depression in the northern Baix Llobregat area

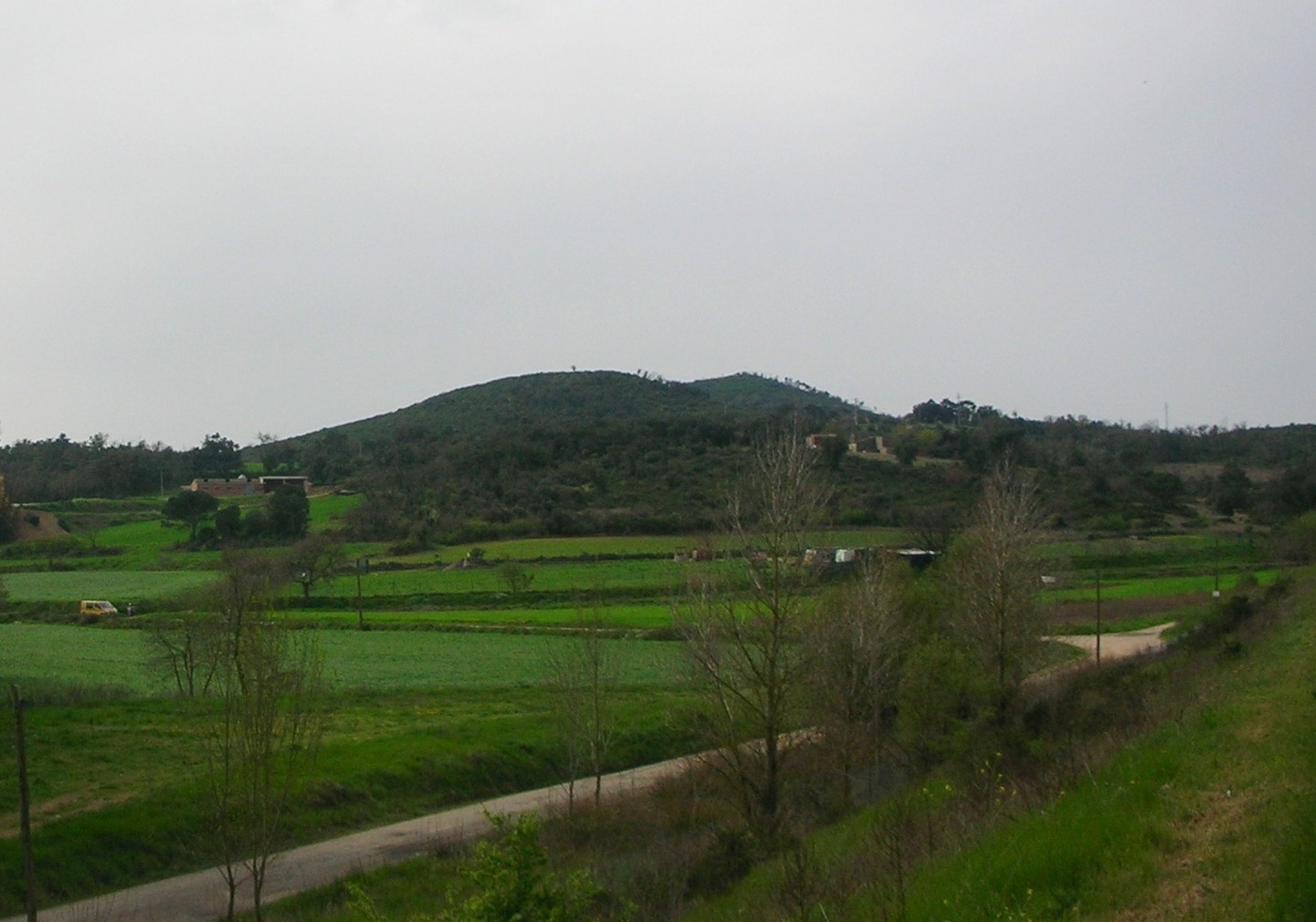
Turó de la Dona Morta a hill of the Catalan Coastal Depression located near Maçanet de la Selva.

The Catalan Coastal Depression (Catalan: Depressió Litoral Catalana) is a natural depression between the Catalan Pre-Coastal Range and the Mediterranean Sea. It is part of the Catalan Mediterranean System.

== Geography ==
The Catalan Coastal Depression runs roughly in a NE-SW direction along parts of the following comarques: Empordà, Gironès, Selva, Maresme, Vallès, Barcelonès, Baix Llobregat, Penedès, Tarragonès, Baix Camp and Baix Ebre.

The Catalan Coastal Depression is about 300 km long and 20 km wide on average Some of the main Catalan cities are located in this area.

== Ecology ==
Much of the surface of the Catalan Coastal Depression is subject to severe land degradation, owing mainly to urban sprawl.

== See also ==
- Catalan Coastal Range
- Catalan Pre-Coastal Range
