= Prat de Comte =

- Municipality
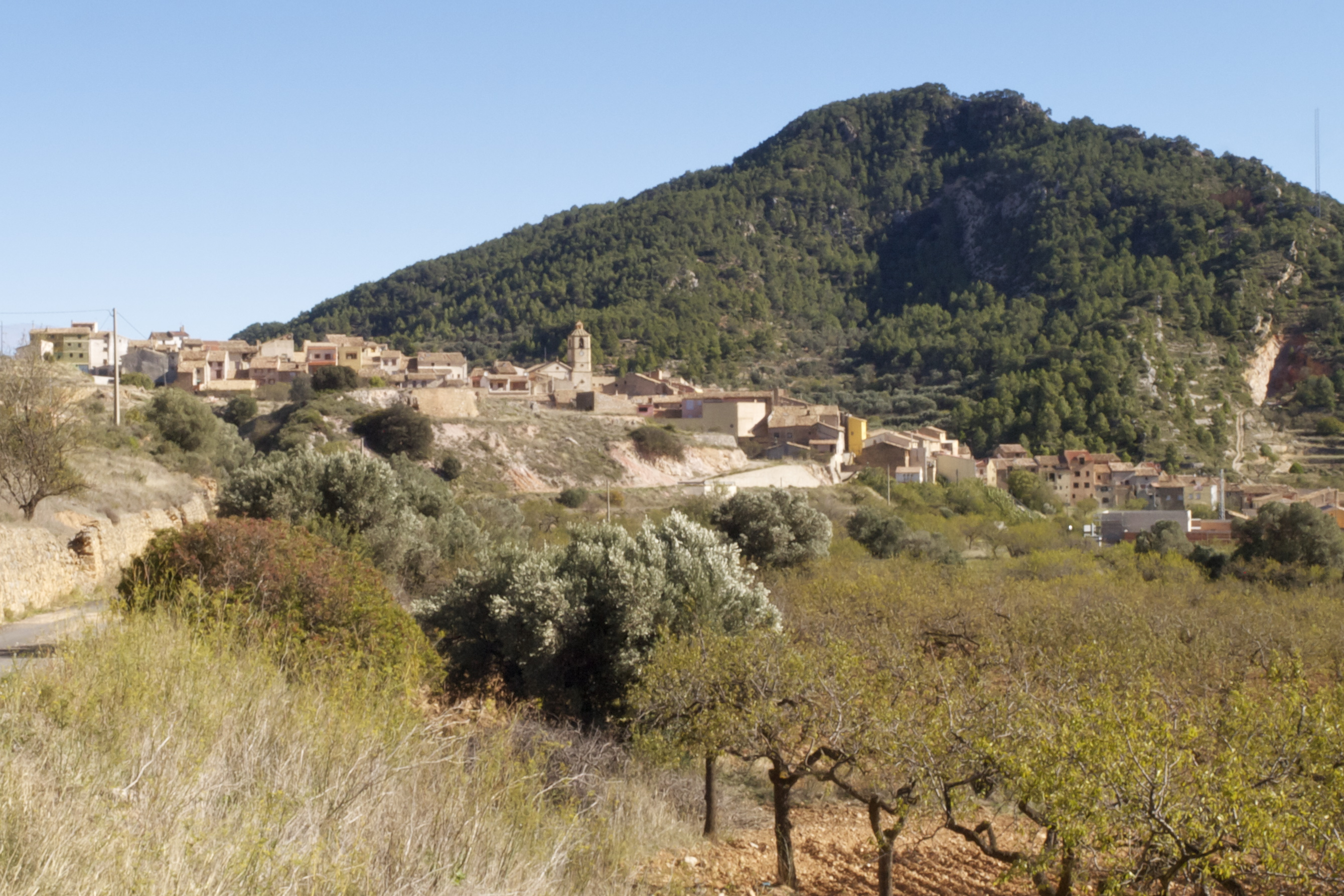
- Prat de Comte

- Flag Coat of arms

- Location in Catalonia
- Coordinates: 40°59′06″N 0°24′26″E
- Country: Spain
- Community: Catalonia
- Province: Tarragona
- Comarca: Terra Alta

Government
  - mayor: Joan Josep Malràs Pascual (2015)

Area
  - Total: 26.4 km^{2} (10.2 sq mi)
- Elevation: 365 m (1,198 ft)

Population (2025-01-01)
  - Total: 174
  - Density: 6.59/km^{2} (17.1/sq mi)
- Postal code: 43117
- Climate: Csa
- Website: www.pratdecomte.altanet.org

Prat de Comte (Catalan pronunciation: [ˈprad de ˈkomte]) is a municipality in the comarca of Terra Alta, in the province of Tarragona, Catalonia, Spain. It has a population of 174 (register office, 2025).

The name of the place has its origins in the Middle Ages, in the words: "el prat donat pel comte", the pasture donated by the Count.

== See also ==
- Battle of the Ebro
