= Terra Alta (comarca) =

Coordinates: 41°03′N 0°26′E

- Comarca
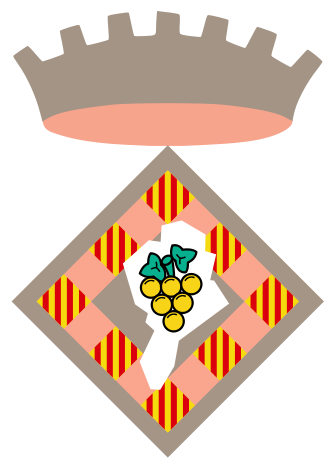
- Coat of arms

- Country: Spain
- Autonomous community: Catalonia
- Region: Terres de l'Ebre
- Province: Tarragona
- Capital: Gandesa
- Municipalities: List: Arnes, Batea, Bot, Caseres, Corbera d'Ebre, La Fatarella, Gandesa, Horta de Sant Joan, El Pinell de Brai, La Pobla de Massaluca, Prat de Comte, Vilalba dels Arcs

Government
  - Body: Terra Alta Comarcal Council
  - President: Lluís Agut (UPTA–PSC) (2023-2025); TBD (ERC) (2025-2027)

Area
  - Total: 743.0 km^{2} (286.9 sq mi)

Population (2014)
  - Total: 12,119
  - Density: 16.31/km^{2} (42.25/sq mi)
- Demonym
- Time zone: UTC+1 (CET)
  - Summer (DST): UTC+2 (CEST)
- Largest municipality: Gandesa
- Website: www.terra-alta.cat

Terra Alta (Western Catalan: [ˈtɛra ˈalta]) is a sparsely populated inland comarca (county) in Terres de l'Ebre, Catalonia (Spain). Its capital is Gandesa. It is also known as Castellania, a name dating back to its medieval status as a fiefdom held by the Order of Knights of the Hospital of St. John of Jerusalem under the Crown of Aragon.

== Municipalities ==
Municipality	Population (2014)	Area km^{2}
Arnes	474	43.0
Batea	1,975	128.4
Bot	630	34.9
Caseres	267	42.9
Corbera d'Ebre	1,136	53.1
La Fatarella	1,051	56.5
Gandesa	3,091	71.2
Horta de Sant Joan	1,219	119.0
El Pinell de Brai	1,076	57.0
La Pobla de Massaluca	354	43.4
Prat de Comte	164	26.4
Vilalba dels Arcs	682	67.2
• Total: 12	12,119	743.0

== Mountain ranges ==
- Serra de Cavalls
- Serra de la Fatarella
- Serra de Pàndols
- Serra dels Pesells
