= Batea, Spain =

Batea
- Municipality
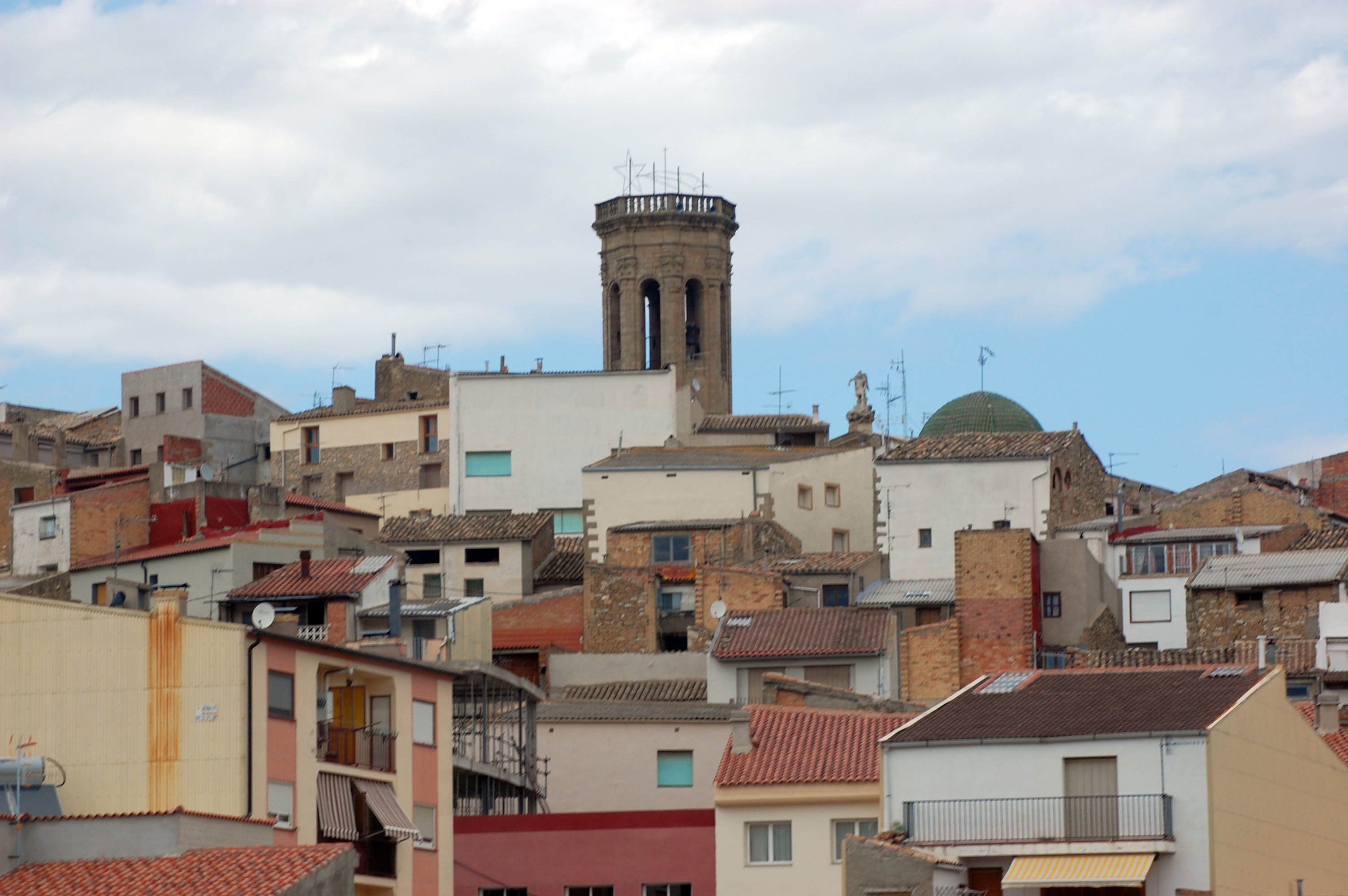
- Batea

- Coat of arms

- Location in Catalonia
- Coordinates: 41.096°N 0.312°E
- Country: Spain
- Community: Catalonia
- Province: Tarragona
- Comarca: Terra Alta

Government
  - mayor: Joaquim Paladella Curto (2015)

Area
  - Total: 128.4 km^{2} (49.6 sq mi)
- Elevation: 376 m (1,234 ft)

Population (2025-01-01)
  - Total: 1,875
  - Density: 14.60/km^{2} (37.82/sq mi)
- Postal code: 43022
- Climate: Csa
- Website: www.batea.altanet.org

Batea (Catalan pronunciation: [baˈtea]) is a municipality in the comarca of Terra Alta, Catalonia, Spain. It has a population of 1,875 (register office, 2025).

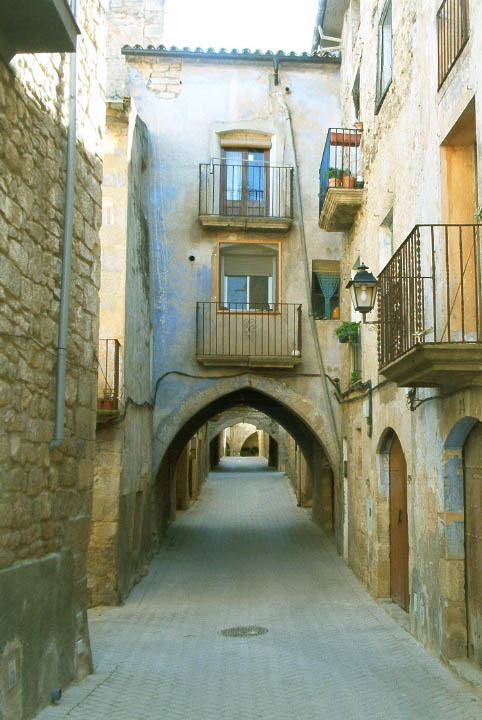
A street in Batea

Batea produces good-quality wine that has not reached high prices in the market and is mainly used for local daily consumption in the region.
