= 1959 in aviation =

This is a list of aviation-related events from 1959.

== Events ==
- The Canadian Golden Hawks aerobatic team is formed.
- The United States Department of the Navy merges its Bureau of Aeronautics and Bureau of Ordnance to form a new Bureau of Naval Weapons.

=== January ===
- Northern Aircraft Inc. becomes the Downer Aircraft Company Inc.
- January 1 – The British government announces its decision to proceed with development of the BAC TSR.2 supersonic tactical strike and reconnaissance aircraft.
- January 6 – While on approach to Tri-Cities Regional Airport in Bristol, Tennessee, Southeast Airlines Flight 308, a Douglas DC-3A, strays off course and crashes into Holston Mountain, killing all 10 people on board.
- January 11 – Lufthansa Flight 502, a Lockheed L-1049G Super Constellation, crashes just short of the runway on approach to land at Rio de Janeiro–Galeão International Airport in Rio de Janeiro, Brazil, killing 36 of the 39 people on board and leaving all three survivors injured.
- January 18 – A United States Air Force F-100C Super Sabre parked at a secret base somewhere in the Pacific Ocean with a nuclear bomb on board catches fire after its external fuel tanks are dropped and explode during a practice alert. The fire is put out in seven minutes and no nuclear explosion takes place.
- January 25 – American Airlines begins its first jet service with a Boeing 707 flight between New York, New York, and Los Angeles, California.
- January 31 – The United States deactivates its Ground Observer Corps.

=== February ===
- February 3
  - American Airlines Flight 320, a Lockheed L-188A Electra, crashes into the East River while on approach to New York City's LaGuardia Airport, killing 65 of the 73 people on board. It is the first fatal accident involving the Electra.
  - Rock music stars Ritchie Valens, Buddy Holly and The Big Bopper die when the Beechcraft Bonanza they are traveling in crashes during a snowstorm in Iowa.
- February 4 – Flying a Cessna 172 Skyhawk (registration N9172B), Robert Timm and John Cook land at McCarran Airfield in Las Vegas, Nevada, after remaining airborne continuously for 64 days 22 hours 19 minutes 5 seconds. The flight sets a new world record for manned flight endurance. They had taken off from McCarran Airfield to begin the flight on December 4, 1958.
- February 17 – A chartered Turkish Airlines Vickers Viscount Type 793 carrying Prime Minister of Turkey Adnan Menderes to London to sign the London Agreement for the constitution of Cyprus strikes trees, loses its wings and engines, and crashes in Jordan's Wood in Newdigate, Surrey, England, while on approach to Gatwick Airport. Fourteen of the 24 people on board die, and nine of the 10 survivors are injured. Menderes survives with only minor scratches on his face and signs the agreement two days later in his hospital bed.
- February 20 – The Canadian government cancels the Avro Canada CF-105 Arrow and requires that all nine Arrows completed or under construction be destroyed. The cancellation results from the belief of Canadian politicians that missile technology had made manned interceptor aircraft unnecessary.

=== March ===
- March 15 – In the Soviet Union, a commercial jet aircraft, a Tupolev Tu-104 (registration CCCP-42419), takes off from Leningrad′s Shosseynaya Airport (the future Pulkovo Airport) for the first time. Construction work had been undertaken at the airport since the mid-1950s to lengthen its runways so that it could accommodate jet aircraft.
- March 20 – Trans World Airlines initiates its first jet service between San Francisco, California, and New York City, using the Boeing 707-131.
- March 29 – Barthélemy Boganda, the prime minister of the Central African Republic autonomous territory (the future Central African Republic) dies when his plane, a UAT Nord Noratlas, explodes in mid-air over Boukpoyanga, killing all nine people on board.
- March 31 – BOAC commences its first scheduled round-the-world westbound service from London in the United Kingdom via New York City, San Francisco, and Honolulu to Tokyo, Japan, and onward to London.

=== April ===
- Kuwait Airways takes over the assets of British International Airlines (BIA).
- April 8 – The Italian World War I ace and famed seaplane racing pilot Mario de Bernardi is performing aerobatics in a light plane over a Rome airport when he begins to experience a heart attack. He lands the plane safely, but dies minutes later at the age of 65.
- April 10 – Six rebels hijack a Compagnie Haitienne de Transports Aériens (COHATA) Douglas DC-3 with 32 people on board during a domestic flight in Haiti from Les Cayes to Port-au-Prince, shoot and kill the pilot, and force the copilot to fly the airliner to Santiago de Cuba in Cuba.
- April 16 – Ten minutes after an Aerovías Cubanas Internacionales airliner (possibly a Curtiss C-46 Commando) with 22 people on board takes off from Havana, Cuba, for a domestic flight to Isla de la Juventud, four men draw guns and force plane to fly to Miami, Florida.
- April 23 – An Air Charter Limited Avro Super Trader IV carrying top-secret equipment from the United Kingdom to the rocket range at Australia's Woomera Airfield crashes on Mount Süphan in Turkey, killing all 12 men on board. The wreckage is not found until April 29.
- April 25 – During the last leg of a Miami, Florida-to-Varadero, Cuba-to-Havana, Cuba, flight, two men and two women who had boarded at Varadero hijack a Cubana de Aviación Vickers Viscount with 12 people on board and force it to fly to Key West, Florida.
- April 29 – An Iberia Douglas C-47A-75-DL Skytrain (registration EC-ABC) crashes into the east slope of the Sierra de Valdemeca about 60 meters (200 feet) from the top of Telegraph Hill in Cuenca, Spain, during a flight from Barcelona to Madrid, killing all 28 people on board. Spanish gymnastics champion Joaquín Blume and his pregnant wife are among the dead.

=== May ===
- May 1 – North Vietnam organizes No. 919 Transport Regiment as the first unit of the Vietnam People's Air Force.
- May 5 – The United States Army's Doak VZ-4 Vertical Takeoff and Landing (VTOL) prototype aircraft transitions from vertical to horizontal flight and vice versa for the first time.
- May 12 – Capital Airlines Flight 75, a Vickers 745D Viscount, breaks apart in severe turbulence and crashes in a rural area near Chase, Maryland, killing all 31 people on board.

=== June ===
- June 4 – Max Conrad flies a Piper Comanche from Casablanca to New York, setting a new light plane distance record of 7,683 miles (12,365 km).
- June 8
  - The United States Navy submarine USS Barbero (SS-317) and the United States Post Office attempt the delivery of mail via Missile Mail.
  - Continental Airlines inaugurates Boeing 707 service with non-stop flights between Chicago and Los Angeles.
- June 16 – Two North Korean Air Force Mikoyan-Gurevich MiG-17s (NATO reporting name "Fresco") fighters attack a United States Navy P4M-1Q Mercator off the coast of North Korea, heavily damaging the Mercator and seriously wounding its tail gunner. The Mercator's crew returns the aircraft safely to Japan.
- June 30 – A U.S. Air Force North American F-100 Super Sabre fighter suffers an in-flight engine fire over Okinawa. The pilot ejects safely, but the F-100 crashes into Miyamori Elementary School and surrounding houses in Uruma, killing 11 students at the school and six other people in the neighborhood and injuring 210 others, including 156 students at the school.

=== July ===
- July 1 – Belgian International Air Services (BIAS) is founded.
- July 6 – A United States Air Force C-124 Globemaster II transporting two nuclear weapons without fissile cores crashes during take-off from Barksdale Air Force Base in Bossier City, Louisiana, and catches fire. The bombs′ high-explosive detonators do not explode and all seven people on board the plane survive, but the aircraft's wreckage and the area surrounding it suffer limited radioactive contamination.
- July 8
  - A hijacker commandeers a JAT airliner with 27 people on board during a domestic flight in the Socialist Federal Republic of Yugoslavia from Tivat to Beograd and forces it to fly to Bari, Italy.
  - Belgian International Air Services (BIAS) begins flight operations with a flight between Rotterdam and London.
  - The Argentine Navy commissions its first aircraft carrier, ARA Independencia (V-1). She is the first aircraft carrier to enter service in Latin America.
- July 9 – A Royal Air Force Vickers Valiant makes the first non-stop flight from England to Cape Town, South Africa.
- July 13 – The Daily Mail race between Marble Arch in London and the Arc de Triomphe in Paris takes place on the 50th anniversary of Louis Blériot's first flight across the English Channel. Squadron Leader Charles Maughan wins the race in 40 minutes 44 seconds using a motorcycle, helicopter, and Hawker Hunter.
- July 14 – Major V. Ilyushin of the Soviet Union sets a new altitude record of 28,852 m (94,659 ft) in the Sukhoi T-431.
- July 29 – Qantas introduces the Boeing 707 on its Sydney-San Francisco route, the first transpacific service flown by jet.

=== August ===
- August 3 – Flying at an altitude of 70,000 feet (21,000 meters) over Utah in a Lockheed U-2 on the seventh flight of his United States Air Force U-2 training program, Republic of China Air Force Major Hsichun "Mike" Hua experiences a surprise flameout due to fuel exhaustion. Unable to return to his base at Laughlin Air Force Base in Texas, he glides the U-2 to a deadstick night landing at Cortez Municipal Airport in Cortez, Colorado, ground-looping the U-2 but landing it intact. The U.S. Air Force awards him the Distinguished Flying Cross for the achievement.
- August 19 – A Transair Douglas Dakota chartered by the British National Union of Students and carrying 29 British students and a crew of three strays off course and crashes in the Montseny Range in Catalonia, Spain, killing all on board. It is Transair's first accident.
- August 21 – The United States Navy cancels the Martin P6M SeaMaster program after the construction of 16 aircraft. The P6M is the last aircraft manufactured by the Martin Company, which subsequently leaves the aircraft business to focus on missiles and electronics.
- August 22 – German-born American pilot Peter Gluckmann, dubbed "The Flying Watchmaker" by the press, takes off from San Francisco, California, in a Meyers 200A to attempt an around-the-world solo flight by light plane, with planned stops at Mexico City, Mexico; San Juan, Puerto Rico; the Azores; Lisbon, Portugal; Cairo, Egypt; Karachi, Pakistan; New Delhi and Calcutta, India; Manila in the Philippines; Tokyo, Japan; and Honolulu, Hawaii, before returning to San Francisco. He files his itinerary with the Fédération Aéronautique Internationale (FAI) to ensure his flight qualifies for official records, the first time a pilot has done so for any around-the-world solo flight.
- August 24 – Pan American World Airways inaugurates the first jetliner service between the continental United States and Hawaii, using Boeing 707s.

=== September ===
- September 4 – Soviet Air Forces test pilot Vladimir Ilyushin sets a world absolute altitude record in the Sukhoi T-431, reaching an altitude of 28,852 meters (94,659 feet).
- September 17 – In the second North American X-15, 56-6671, Scott Crossfield makes the first powered X-15 flight, reaching Mach 2.11 at 52,341 feet (15,954 meters).
- September 20 – German-born American pilot Peter Gluckmann, dubbed "The Flying Watchmaker" by the press, reaches San Francisco, California, in a Meyers 200A, completing an around-the-world solo flight in 29 days, 6 hours 8 minutes, 52.2 seconds. It is the first flight around the world in a light plane, and the first to establish an official record for a solo around-the-world flight because Gluckmann had filed his itinerary with the Fédération Aéronautique Internationale (FAI), something that previous pilots who made record-setting around-world solo flights — Wiley Post in 1933, Howard Hughes in 1938,band William P. "Bill" Odom in 1947 — had failed to do, making their records unofficial. Gluckmann establishes the FAI "Speed Around the World, Eastbound" record for two classes of aircraft, C-1 (landplane, internal combustion) and C-1d (landplane, internal combustion, 1,750 kg (3,858 lb) to less than 3,000 kg (6,614 lb)).
- September 23 – The United States Air Force officially cancels the North American Aviation XF-108 Rapier.
- September 24 – The Transports Aériens Intercontinentaux (TAI) Douglas DC-7C F-BIAP flies into trees while departing Bordeaux–Mérignac Airport, in Mérignac, France, and crashes, killing 54 of the 65 people on board and leaving all 11 survivors injured.
- September 25 – A United States Navy P5M Marlin antisubmarine plane carrying an unarmed nuclear depth charge ditches in Puget Sound near Whidbey Island, Washington. The depth charge is not recovered.
- September 29 – Braniff Flight 542, a Lockheed L-188 Electra, disintegrates in mid-air and crashes near Buffalo, Texas, killing all 34 people on board.

=== October ===
- Scott Crossfield reaches Mach 2.15 in the second North American X-15, 56-6671.
- October 2 – Three hijackers commandeer a Cubana de Aviación Vickers Viscount with 40 people on board during a domestic flight in Cuba from Havana to Santiago de Cuba and force it to fly to Miami, Florida.
- October 15
  - A United States Air Force Convair B-58 Hustler flies 1,680 miles (2,700 km) in 80 minutes with one refueling, maintaining a speed of more than Mach 2 for more than an hour. The B-58 is the world's first bomber capable of Mach 2 flight.
  - Two U.S. Air Force aircraft – a B-52F-100-BO Stratofortress bomber with two nuclear bombs on board and a KC-135 Stratotanker – collide in mid-air at an altitude of 32,000 feet (9,800 meters) during an aerial refueling procedure near Hardinsburg, Kentucky. Both planes crash, killing two of the four crew members aboard the KC-135 and six members of the B-52's crew. The crash of the B-52 damages one unarmed nuclear weapon, but no nuclear contamination results.
- October 26 – A Pacific Air Lines Douglas DC-3 operating as Flight 308 with a crew of three and 17 passengers aboard suffers engine failure just after takeoff from Santa Maria, California. The pilot attempts an emergency landing 1.5 miles (2.4 km) from the airport, but the plane cartwheels and crashes, killing the copilot and injuring the pilot, purser, and passengers.
- October 30 – The Piedmont Airlines Douglas DC-3 Buckeye Pacemaker, operating as Flight 349, crashes on Bucks Elbow Mountain near Crozet, Virginia, killing 26 of the 27 people on board and seriously injuring the sole survivor, a passenger who is found near the wreckage still strapped into his seat.
- October 31 – Colonel G. Mosolov of the Soviet Union sets a new airspeed record of 2,387 km/h (1,483 mph) in the Mikoyan-Gurevich Ye-66

=== November ===
- November 5 – After suffering an in-flight engine fire, the second North American X-15, 56-6671, piloted by Scott Crossfield, breaks its back making an emergency landing on Rosamond Dry Lake, California.
- November 16 – National Airlines Flight 967, a Douglas DC-7B, crashes in the Gulf of Mexico with the loss of all 42 people on board. An in-flight bombing is suspected but never proven.
- November 21 – Two minutes after takeoff from Beirut, Lebanon, Ariana Afghan Airlines Flight 202, a Douglas DC-4, crashes into the side of a hill at Aramoun, killing 24 of the 27 people on board.
- November 24 – TWA Flight 595, a cargo flight operated by a Lockheed L-1049H Super Constellation, crashed after entering an excessive bank while turning back to Chicago-Midway Airport due to a suspected engine fire. All three people aboard the plane and eight people on the ground die in the crash. The Civil Aeronautics Board's Bureau of Aviation Safety — predecessor to the National Transportation Safety Board — concludes that there was no actual fire and determines the cause of the crash to be pilot error.
- November 26 – German-born American pilot Peter Gluckmann, dubbed "The Flying Watchmaker" by the press, flies a new Cessna 172 with a 145 hp (108 kW) engine on a 2,400-mile (3,900 km) delivery flight from Oakland, California, to Honolulu, Hawaii. The flight takes 20 hours 39 minutes. The 250-pound (113 kg) Gluckmann claims that he has set a record for the biggest man to fly such a small plane over a such a long distance.

=== December ===
- December 2 – During a revolt against President of Brazil Juscelino Kubitschek, Brazilian Air Force officers seize several of the air force's planes and hijack a Panair do Brasil Lockheed L-049 Constellation (registration PP-PCR) with 44 people on board while it is making a domestic flight in Brazil from Rio de Janeiro to Belém. When the revolt fails, they force the Constellation to fly them to Buenos Aires, Argentina.
- December 3 – The Italian airline Società Aerea Mediterranea (SAM), previously active from March 1928 to August 1934, is relaunched as a subsidiary of Alitalia.
- December 6 – Flying a McDonnell F4H-1 Phantom II, U.S. Navy Commander Lawrence E. Flint sets a new world altitude record of 98,556 feet (30,040 meters) in Operation Top Flight.
- December 14 – A U.S. Air Force Lockheed F-104C Starfighter sets a new world altitude record of 103,389 ft (31,513 m).
- December 15 – U.S. Air Force Major J. W. Roberts sets a new world airspeed record of 1,525.93 mph (2,455.75 km/h) in a Convair F-106 Delta Dart.

== First flights ==
- Fairchild VZ-5

=== January ===
- January 8 – Armstrong Whitworth AW.650 Argosy
- January 20 – Vickers Vanguard
- January 27 – Convair 880

=== February ===
- February 3 – Agusta-Bell AB.102
- February 11 – McDonnell 119
- February 28 – Aérospatiale Alouette III

=== March ===
- March 10 – North American X-15 (captive flight; did not detach from its B-52A Stratofortress mothership)
- March 11 – Sikorsky HSS-2 Sea King (redesignated SH-3 Sea King in 1962)
- March 12 – Aero Boero AB-95
- March 31 – Millicer Air Tourer

=== April ===
- April 5 – Aero L-29 Delfín
- April 7 – Tsybin NM-1 - low power aerodynamic test-bed for Tsybin RSR supersonic reconnaissance bomber.
- April 13 – Grumman OV-1 Mohawk
- April 22 – UTVA-56
- April 29 – Dornier Do 28

=== May ===
- May 4 – Pilatus PC-6
- May 6 – SNECMA Coléoptère - Vertical flight
- May 7 – Procaer Picchio
- May 10 – Dassault Communauté
- May 15 – SGP M-222 Flamingo
- May 20 – Max Holste MH.250 Super Broussard

=== June ===
- June 5 – Sud-Aviation SA 3200 Frelon
- June 8 – North American X-15 (unpowered glide)
- June 8 – Wassmer WA-40
- June 10 – Morane-Saulnier MS-880
- June 10 – SNCASE SE.3200 Frelon
- June 17 – Dassault Mirage IV

=== July ===
- July 14 – Sukhoi T-431
- July 30 – Northrop N-156F, prototype of the F-5 Freedom Fighter

=== September ===
- September 14 – Beechcraft Debonair
- September 15 – LASA 60
- September 17 – North American X-15 56-6671 (powered)

=== October ===
- Agusta A.103
- October 27 – Myasishchev M-50
- October 29 – Lightning F.1, first operational production model of the English Electric Lightning

=== November ===
- November 12 – Avro Canada VZ-9 Avrocar
- November 23 – Boeing 720
- November 24 – Hiller X-18
- November 25 – Lockheed YP3V-1 – First operational prototype.

=== December ===
- December 13 – Aviamilano Scricciolo I-MAGY

== Entered service ==
- Sukhoi Su-7 (NATO reporting name "Fitter-A")
- Sukhoi Su-9 (NATO reporting name "Fitter-B" and "Fishpot") with the Soviet Air Defense Forces

=== February ===
- Aeritalia G91R with the Italian Air Force

=== March ===
- March 26 – Breguet Alizé with the French Naval Aviation.

=== April ===
- April 20 – Ilyushin Il-18 with Aeroflot.

=== May ===
- Convair F-106 Delta Dart with the United States Air Force′s 498th Fighter-Interceptor Squadron at Geiger Field, Spokane, Washington.

=== June ===
- June 12 – Lockheed C-130 Hercules with the U.S. Air Force's 463rd Troop Carrier Wing.

=== July ===
- de Havilland Sea Vixen with the Royal Navy's Fleet Air Arm
- North American T2J Buckeye (later T-2 Buckeye) with United States Navy Training Squadron 4 (VT-4)
- July 22
  - Sud Aviation Caravelle with Air France
  - Antonov An-10 with Aeroflot

=== September ===
- September 18 – Douglas DC-8 with Delta Air Lines and United Air Lines.

=== December ===
- GAM-77 Hound Dog air-to-ground cruise missile with United States Air Force Strategic Air Command B-52 Stratofortresses.

== Retirements ==
=== December ===
- Martin PBM-5A Mariner by the Netherlands Naval Aviation Service
- December 8 – Cancargo CAM-1 Loadmaster by the Ballard Aircraft Corporation

== Deadliest crash ==
The deadliest crash of this year was TWA Flight 891, a Lockheed L-1649 Starliner which crashed shortly after takeoff from Milan, Italy on 26 June, killing all 68 people on board.
