= 245th Mixed Brigade =

245th Mixed Brigade 245.ª Brigada Mixta
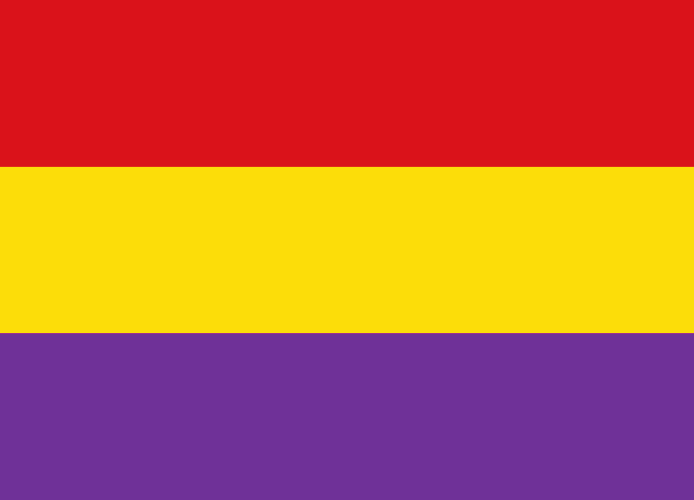
- Military flag of the Popular Army
- Active: 1938 - 1939
- Country: Spain
- Branch: Spanish Republican Army
- Type: Mixed Brigade
- Role: Home Defence
- Size: Four battalions (projected): The 977, 978, 979 and 980
- Part of: 77th Division; 24th Army Corps; Eastern Region Army Group (GERO)
- Garrison/HQ: Not known
- Engagements: Spanish Civil War

Commanders
- Notable commanders: Unknown

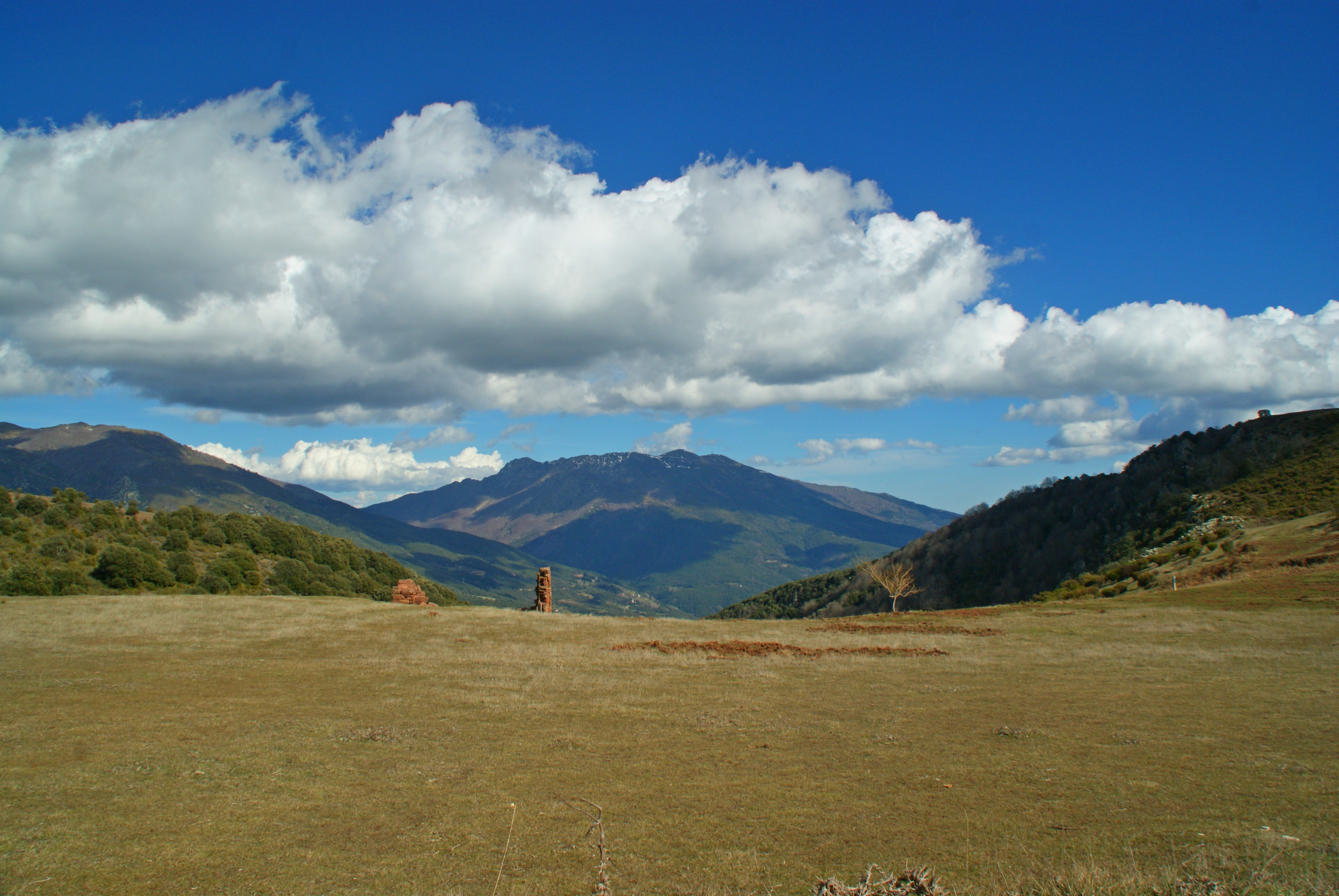
The 245th MB crossed the Montseny Range at the end of January 1939 in order to try to defend the town of Vic.

The 245th Mixed Brigade (Spanish: 245.ª Brigada Mixta), was a mixed brigade of the Spanish Republican Army in the Spanish Civil War.

Hastily formed in the winter in Catalonia shortly before the end of the war in order to defend the beleaguered Spanish Republic, it would be the only mixed brigade of the 77th Division, the last division to be established.

== History ==
=== Incomplete formation of the brigade ===
The decision to establish the 245th Mixed Brigade was taken in December 1938 in Catalonia, shortly before the onset of the rebel faction's unstoppable Catalonia Offensive. The brigade was formed in an undisclosed location and the names of the commanding officers in charge of the instruction of the hastily gathered recruits are unknown.

The 245th Mixed Brigade was made part of the 77th Division, another ill-prepared and hastily established unit. Part of the 24th Army Corps of the Eastern Region Army Group (GERO), the 77th Division would be the last Spanish Republican division to be established. Like in all of the mixed brigades of the last period of the Spanish republic, the officers were drafted from the reserve.

=== Failure of the Line of Resistance and extinction ===
Without being adequately equipped the 245th Mixed Brigade was sent to the Tordera River in the last week of January 1939, around the time of the Fall of Barcelona. Its mission was to attempt to establish a defensive line for which, together with the 242nd Mixed Brigade which was posted further downriver, it took positions along the middle course of the Tordera. The aim was to halt the swift advance of the enemy, but at the end of the month the idea of a Line of Resistance was abandoned by the high command as unrealistic owing to the lack of battle-ready Republican units and the overwhelming pressure of the rebel forces.

The 245th Mixed Brigade was sent then across the Montseny Massif to Vic in order to defend the town. But the march across the mountain range in the cold winter weather, and without proper food supplies and equipment, was an arduous task. Once near Vic the brigade tried to halt the enemy advance against the town, but it had to withdraw in the face of the fierce rebel onslaught and quickly fell apart, the scattered remainders of the unit being unable to regroup. By 1 February to all effects the 245th Mixed Brigade was disbanded.

== See also ==
- 77th Division
- Catalonia Offensive
- Mixed Brigades
