= 77th Division (Spain) =

77th Division 77ª División
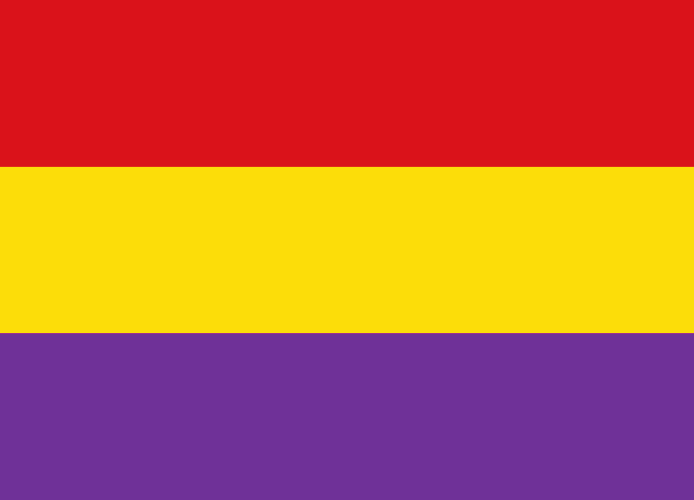
- Military flag of the Popular Army
- Active: 31 December 1938 – February 1939
- Country: Spain
- Branch: Spanish Republican Army
- Type: Infantry division
- Role: Home Defence
- Size: One mixed brigade: 245th
- Part of: XXIV Army Corps
- Garrison/HQ: Calella
- Engagements: Spanish Civil War

Commanders
- Notable commanders: Rafael Durán Martínez

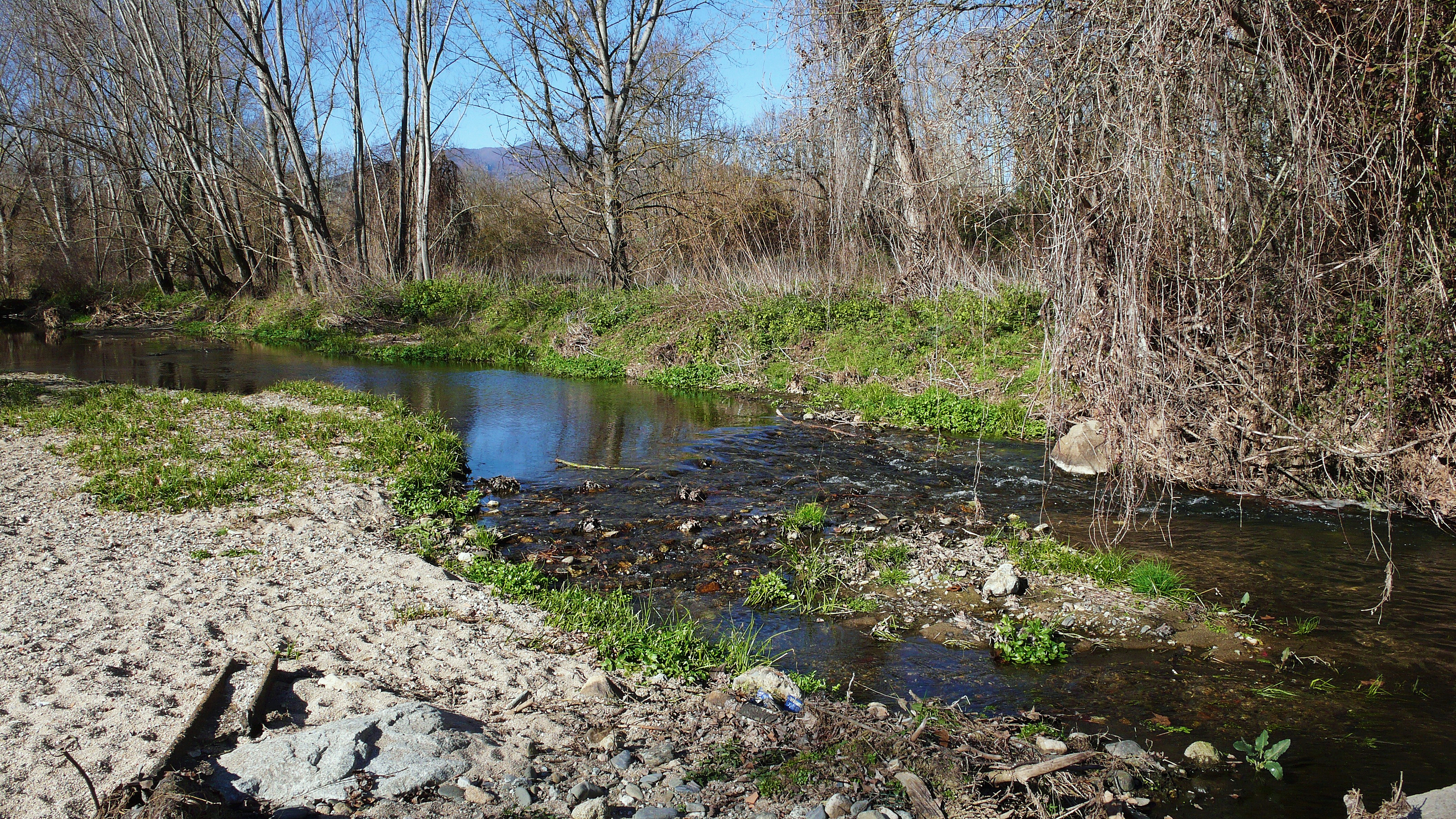
The Tordera River close to Sant Celoni where the 77th Division sought to establish a last line of resistance in a desperate effort to halt the enemy.

The 77th Division (Spanish: 77ª División) was a division of the Spanish Republican Army in the Spanish Civil War. It would be the last division of the loyalist forces to be formed.

The 77th Division was a short-lived unit that was established in December 1938, shortly before the chaotic withdrawal and rush to the border that followed the Francoist Catalonia Offensive. The division was also not fully formed when it first saw action, for it included only the 245th Mixed Brigade.

== History ==
=== Incomplete formation of the unit ===
The 77th Division was established on 31 December 1938 in Calella with the also recently formed 245th Mixed Brigade. It was placed under the XXIV Army Corps (XVIV Cuerpo de Ejército) of the Group of Eastern Region Armies (GERO). The command of the unit was entrusted to Infantry Commander Rafael Durán Martínez, who also would be the short-lived division's only leader.

In the last week of January 1939 the 77th Division, together with the 242nd Mixed Brigade —which had not been ascribed to any division—, tried to establish a planned defensive line along the course of the Tordera River in order to halt the massive rebel offensive.

=== Line of Resistance Fiasco ===
The units took position along the course of the Tordera River east of the Montseny Massif on 27 January. But the effort proved futile and in practice it became impossible for the Republican forces to put up any meaningful resistance. The young, inexperienced and ill-equipped 242rd Mixed Brigade —posted at the lower course of the river— was unfit for the battle. At the onset of the fight it quickly fell into disarray and was overrun.

In the face of the powerful and steady enemy advance the 77th Division abandoned the defensive line and withdrew to the town of Vic, which it lost on 1 February. Meanwhile, practically all other Republican Army units were demoralized and were hastily rushing to the north towards the French border. In the midst of the chaotic retreat, the 77th Division was to all effects disbanded and data about its final whereabouts and fate as a military unit are unknown.

== Commanders ==
- Commanders in Chief
  - Rafael Durán Martínez

== See also ==
- Group of Eastern Region Armies
- Mixed Brigades
