= Gualba =

- Municipality
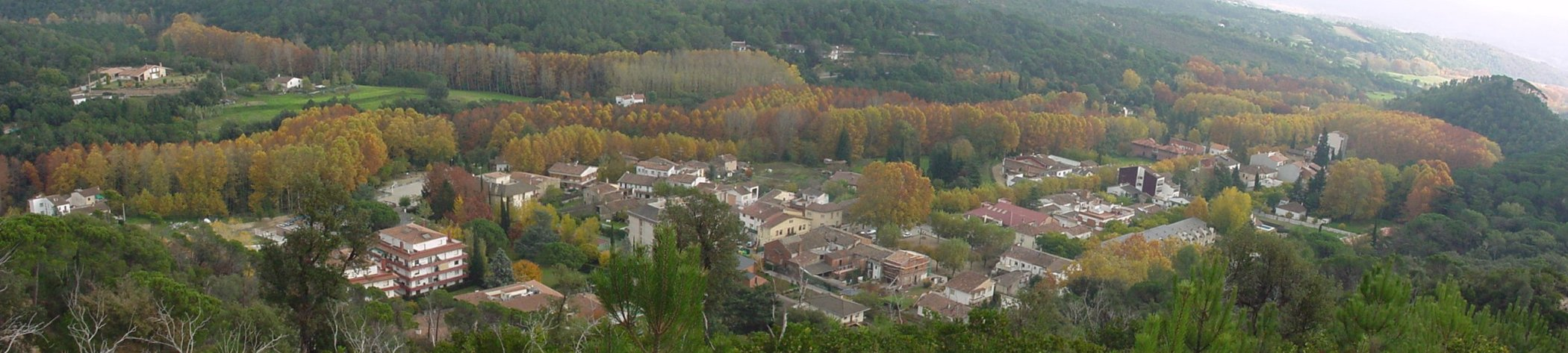

- Coat of arms

- Location in Catalonia Gualba (Spain)
- Coordinates: 41°43′56″N 2°30′17″E
- Country: Spain
- Autonomous community: Catalonia
- Province: Barcelona
- Comarca: Vallès Oriental

Government
  - mayor: Marc Uriach Cortinas (2015)

Area
  - Municipality: 23.3 km^{2} (9.0 sq mi)
  - Metro: 0 km^{2} (0 sq mi)
- Elevation: 177 m (581 ft)

Population (2025-01-01)
  - Municipality: 1,766
  - Density: 75.8/km^{2} (196/sq mi)
- 2025-1753
- Demonym: Gualbenc
- Postal code: 08474
- Area code: 93
- ISO 3166 code: ES-CT
- Website: www.gualba.cat

Gualba (Catalan pronunciation: [ˈgwalβə]) is a municipality in Catalonia, Spain. It is in Barcelona Province in the comarca of Vallès Oriental. As of 2014, the population was 1,429.

The town is at the foot of the Montseny Massif, near the Santa Fe Reservoir.
