= Fogars =

Fogars may refer to:

- Fogars de Montclús, municipality in the comarca of Vallès Oriental
- Fogars de la Selva, municipality in the comarca of Selva
