= Dan-Air Flight 1903 =

1970 aviation accident

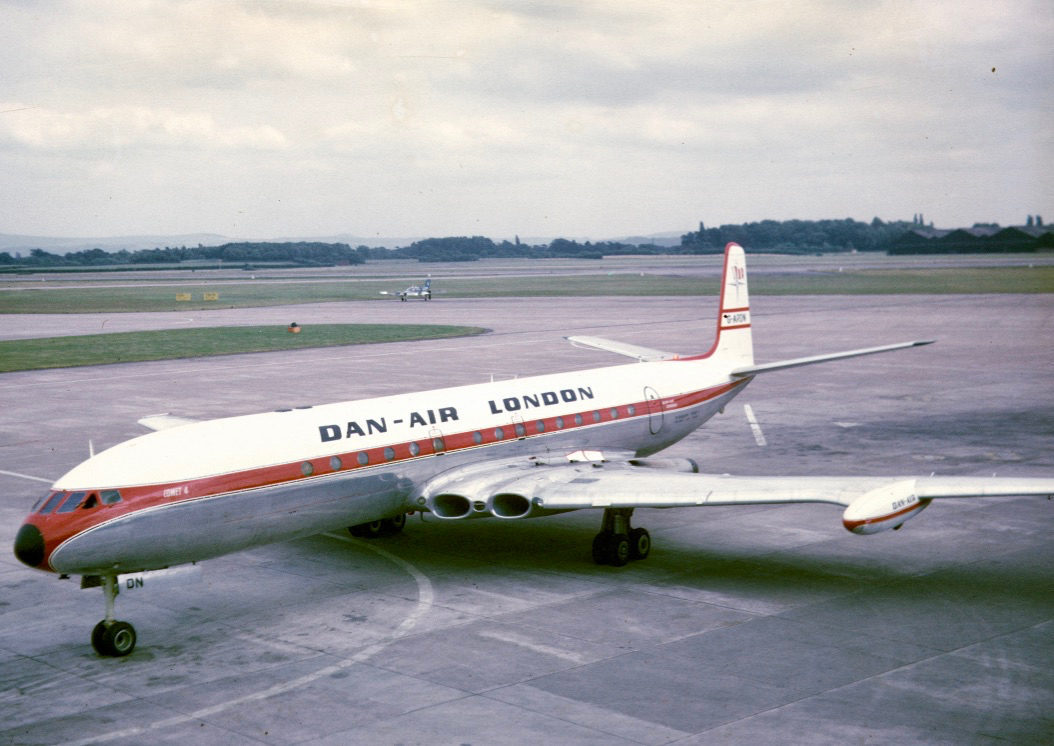
- G-APDN, the aircraft involved in the accident, pictured eight days before the crash

Accident
- Date: 3 July 1970
- Summary: Controlled flight into terrain
- Site: Near Arbúcies, Catalonia, Spain; 41°47′45″N 2°27′34″E

Aircraft
- Aircraft type: de Havilland DH 106 Comet series 4
- Operator: Dan Air Services Ltd
- IATA flight No.: DA1903
- ICAO flight No.: DAN1903
- Call sign: DAN-AIR 1903
- Registration: G-APDN
- Flight origin: Manchester Airport, United Kingdom
- Destination: Barcelona–El Prat Airport, Spain
- Occupants: 112
- Passengers: 105
- Crew: 7
- Fatalities: 112
- Survivors: 0

Dan-Air Flight 1903 was an unscheduled international passenger service from Manchester to Barcelona, operated by Dan Air Services Limited under contract with British tour operator Clarksons Holidays, which arranged for the flight to carry a group of holidaymakers who had booked an all-inclusive package holiday with the operator.

On 3 July 1970, the de Havilland Comet 4 aircraft serving the flight crashed into the wooded slopes of the Serralada del Montseny near Arbúcies, in the Province of Girona of Catalonia, Spain. The accident resulted in the aircraft's destruction and the deaths of all 112 on board. It was the deadliest aviation accident in 1970, and remains the deadliest aviation accident involving the De Havilland Comet.

The accident was Dan-Air's first fatal accident killing fare-paying passengers. News of the first major accident, in the company's eighteenth year of existence, came just two days after British tour operator Global Holidays had awarded it a four-year, £2.5-million contract for all Global charter flights from Birmingham, starting in April 1971.

== Accident ==
Flight 1903, which had departed Manchester Airport at 16:08 BST, encountered air traffic control (ATC) delays in the Paris area, resulting in a change of route. Radio contact between the pilot flying the aircraft and Barcelona Area Control Centre (ACC) was established at 17:53 local time, following which ACC gave the flightdeck crew clearance to descend from Flight Level 220 to FL090. Six minutes later, the flight was handed over to Barcelona ATC (approach control), and acknowledged that Runway 25 was in use at Barcelona Airport. Approach control cleared the crew to overfly the Sabadell non-directional beacon (NDB) 14 miles (23 km) to the north of Barcelona VOR and descend further to FL060. This involved turning left to a heading of approximately 140 degrees to intercept the extended centreline of runway 25 at 12 miles (10 nmi; 19 km).

While carrying out the left turn as instructed, the crew reported in error that they had passed the Sabadell NDB. In fact they were still 28 nautical miles (32 mi; 52 km) north of Sabadell at the time, over the Serralada del Montseny, a mountain range in which the highest peaks rise to over 5,600 ft (1,700 m). As, according to ATC, another aircraft overflew Sabadell at the same time, Barcelona ATC mistook that second aircraft's radar echo for that of the Dan-Air Comet and so the air traffic controller handling the Dan-Air flight did not notice the navigational error by the Comet's crew. However, there is no proof that another aircraft overflew the Sabadell beacon at that time. The testimony of the air traffic controller remains implausible. Owing to lack of evidence to the contrary, the controller cleared the Dan-Air crew to continue their descent to 2,800 ft (850 m).

At approximately 19:05 CEST, the aircraft crashed into a group of beech trees on the northeast slopes of the Les Agudes peak at an altitude of about 3,800 ft (1,200 m). At the time of the accident, Les Agudes was under half cloud cover at 2,500 ft (760 m) with good visibility below. The explosion following the impact completely destroyed the aircraft and instantly killed everyone on board. The accident site was located 23 miles (20 nmi; 37 km) from Sabadell on a bearing of 45 degrees, where the mountains reach a height of 5,100 ft (1,600 m). After an extensive all-night search over a wide area, rescue teams reached the accident site the following day. The Spanish authorities insisted on an immediate burial of the dead bodies for public health reasons.

== Aircraft ==
The aircraft, operated by Dan Air Services Ltd, was a de Havilland DH 106 Comet series 4 (registration: G-APDN, construction/manufacturer's serial number: 6415) that had its first flight in 1959. Dan-Air acquired the aircraft from British Overseas Airways Corporation – its original operator – in 1969. At the time of the accident, it had flown 25,786 hours.

== Cause ==
The investigation identified a combination of erroneous information, in relation to en-route reporting points and the existence of a radar echo from another aircraft that overflew the Sabadell NDB at the same time as the Dan-Air crew mistakenly reported passing it, as the accident's probable cause. This combination resulted in an involuntary error on the part of both ATC and aircraft that could not be corrected by the time the air traffic controller realised that his instructions to the aircraft's crew were given in response to a mutual misunderstanding, which resulted from a navigational error on the crew's part that had gone unnoticed.

== In popular culture ==
In 2021, the public television company in Catalonia, the Catalan Media Corporation, produced a free-to-watch documentary on the Crash of Flight 1903. It was titled Montseny, la tragèdia enterrada (Montseny, the Buried Tragedy), which alludes to the abrupt burial of the victims after the disaster. Family members of some of the English victims were interviewed, and a diary of one of the victims of the accident was found and returned to her family.
