= 245th Regiment =

245th Regiment may refer to:

- 245th Aviation Regiment, United States
- 245th Coast Artillery, United States
- 245th (Belfast) Heavy Anti-Aircraft Regiment, Royal Artillery, Britain
- 245th Motor Rifle Regiment, Russia

== See also ==
- 245th Brigade (disambiguation)
