= 245th Division =

245th Division may refer to:

- 245th Infantry Division (Wehrmacht), Germany
- 245th Fighter Aviation Division, Soviet Union
- 245th Motor Rifle Division, Soviet Union
- 245th Rifle Division, Soviet Union

== See also ==
- List of military divisions by number
- 245th Brigade (disambiguation)
- 245th Regiment (disambiguation)
