= Les Agudes =

Mountain in Catalonia, Spain

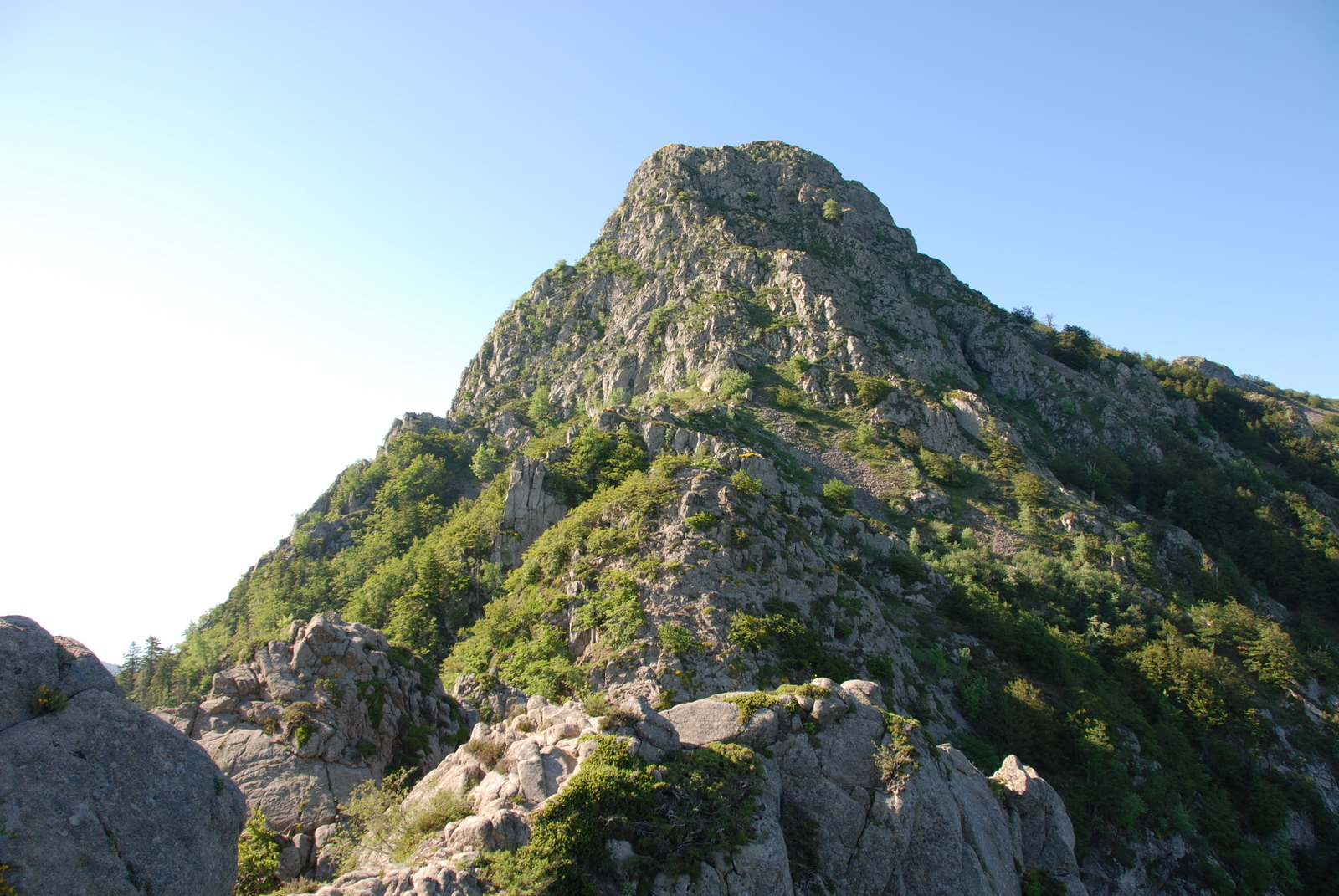
- Les Agudes

Highest point
- Elevation: 1,706 m (5,597 ft)
- Listing: Mountains of Catalonia
- Coordinates: 41°47′22″N 2°26′38″E

Geography
- Location within Catalonia Location within Spain
- Location: Catalonia, Spain
- Parent range: Montseny Massif

Les Agudes is a mountain of Catalonia, Spain. It has an elevation of 1,706 metres (5,597 ft) above sea level. It is straddling the municipalities of Arbúcies in the Selva comarca and Fogars de Montclús and Montseny in the Vallès Oriental.

The wooded north-east slope was the crash site of Dan-Air Flight 1903, which occurred on Friday, 3 July 1970.
