= 1959 Transair Douglas Dakota accident =

1959 aviation accident

Coordinates: 41°17′N 002°04′E

Transair Douglas Dakota accident
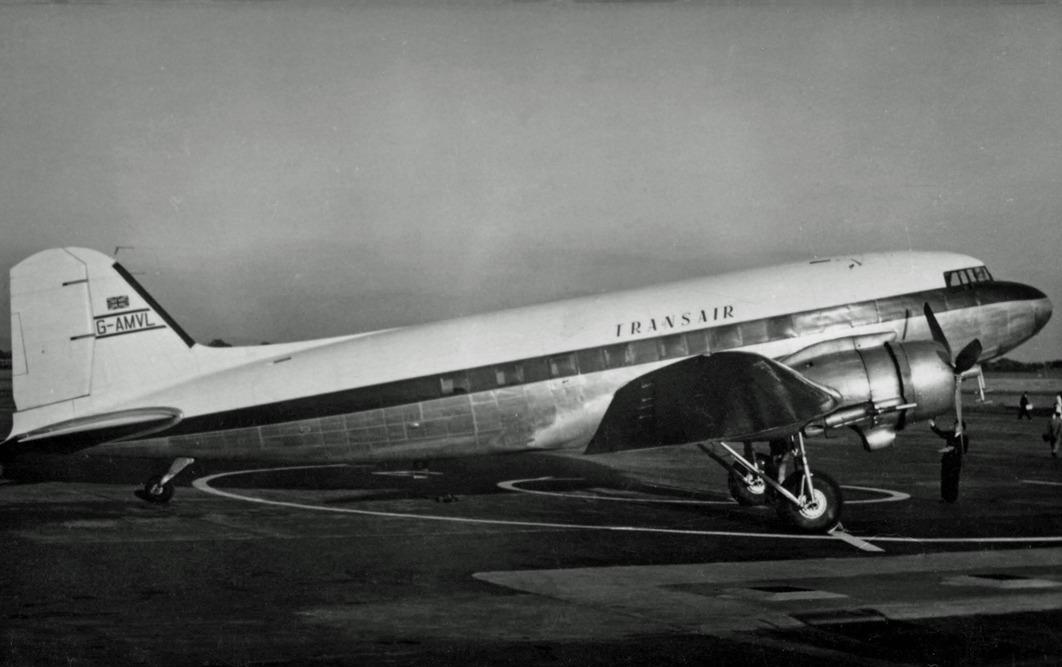
- A similar Transair Dakota

Accident
- Date: 19 August 1959
- Summary: VFR into IMC; Controlled flight into terrain
- Site: Montseny Range, Catalonia, Spain

Aircraft
- Aircraft type: Douglas Dakota
- Operator: Transair
- Registration: G-AMZD
- Flight origin: Barcelona Airport, Spain
- Destination: London-Gatwick Airport, United Kingdom
- Passengers: 29
- Crew: 3
- Fatalities: 32
- Injuries: 0
- Survivors: 0

The Transair Douglas Dakota accident was an aircraft accident that occurred on 19 August 1959, when a Douglas Dakota operated by British airline Transair on a non-scheduled flight from Barcelona Airport in Spain to London-Gatwick Airport in the United Kingdom crashed in Spain. The aircraft, which was carrying 29 students home to England, had been chartered by the National Union of Students to conduct regular weekly flights between Gatwick and Barcelona. It was the first accident suffered by a Transair aircraft following the airline's formation in 1947.

== Accident ==
The aircraft, registered G-AMZD, had arrived early on the day of the accident at Barcelona from Gatwick with a party of students on board, and was scheduled to return to London with another group of students who were returning home from a holiday in Majorca. The flight was conducted under visual flight rules (VFR); however, 19 minutes after departure from Barcelona, while climbing to its cruising altitude, the Dakota entered cloud and struck Turó de l'Home, a mountain north east of Barcelona. At the time of the accident, the aircraft was 10 nautical miles (19 km) away from its intended flight path. Locals reported that at the time of the crash it was misty in the area.

An official at a nearby weather station raised the alarm upon observing the crash. Upon arrival, the Spanish Civil Guard found the wreckage of the aircraft had been burnt out by a post-impact fire. All 29 passengers and three crew were killed.

== Probable cause ==
Following an investigation of the accident, a report from the Spanish Director-General of Civil Aviation stated:

From an examination of the evidence it can be concluded that the accident was caused through infringement of the regulations and instructions in force for flight over national territory, or of the international standards which are in force in Spain.

The Director-General also stated that the evidence did not indicate that Spanish Air Traffic Control personnel were responsible for the crash through their actions in any way. In addition, there was no evidence found that any defects in aids to navigation contributed to the accident. Accordingly, the British Air Ministry, also investigating the crash, resolved to close the case without allocating responsibility. It was concluded that the pilot should not have entered cloud without advising air traffic control that he required an instrument flight clearance; it was presumed that the pilot was unaware that Turó de l'Home, 1,712 metres (5,617 ft) in height, was in the path of the aircraft at the time the Dakota entered the clouds.
