= 242nd Mixed Brigade =

242nd Mixed Brigade 242.ª Brigada Mixta
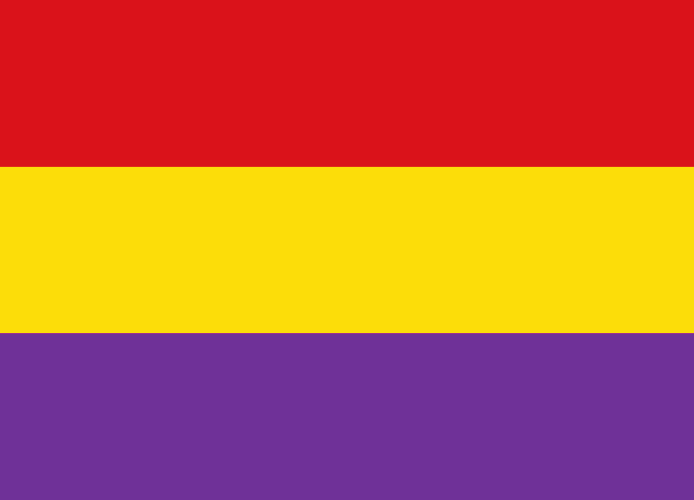
- Military flag of the Popular Army
- Active: December 1938 – 1 February 1939
- Country: Spain
- Branch: Spanish Republican Army
- Type: Mixed Brigade
- Role: Home Defence
- Size: Four battalions (projected): The 965, 966, 967 and 968
- Part of: Not assigned to a division
- Garrison/HQ: Vic
- Engagements: Spanish Civil War

Commanders
- Notable commanders: Lucio Doménech Martínez; Julio Marín Serrano

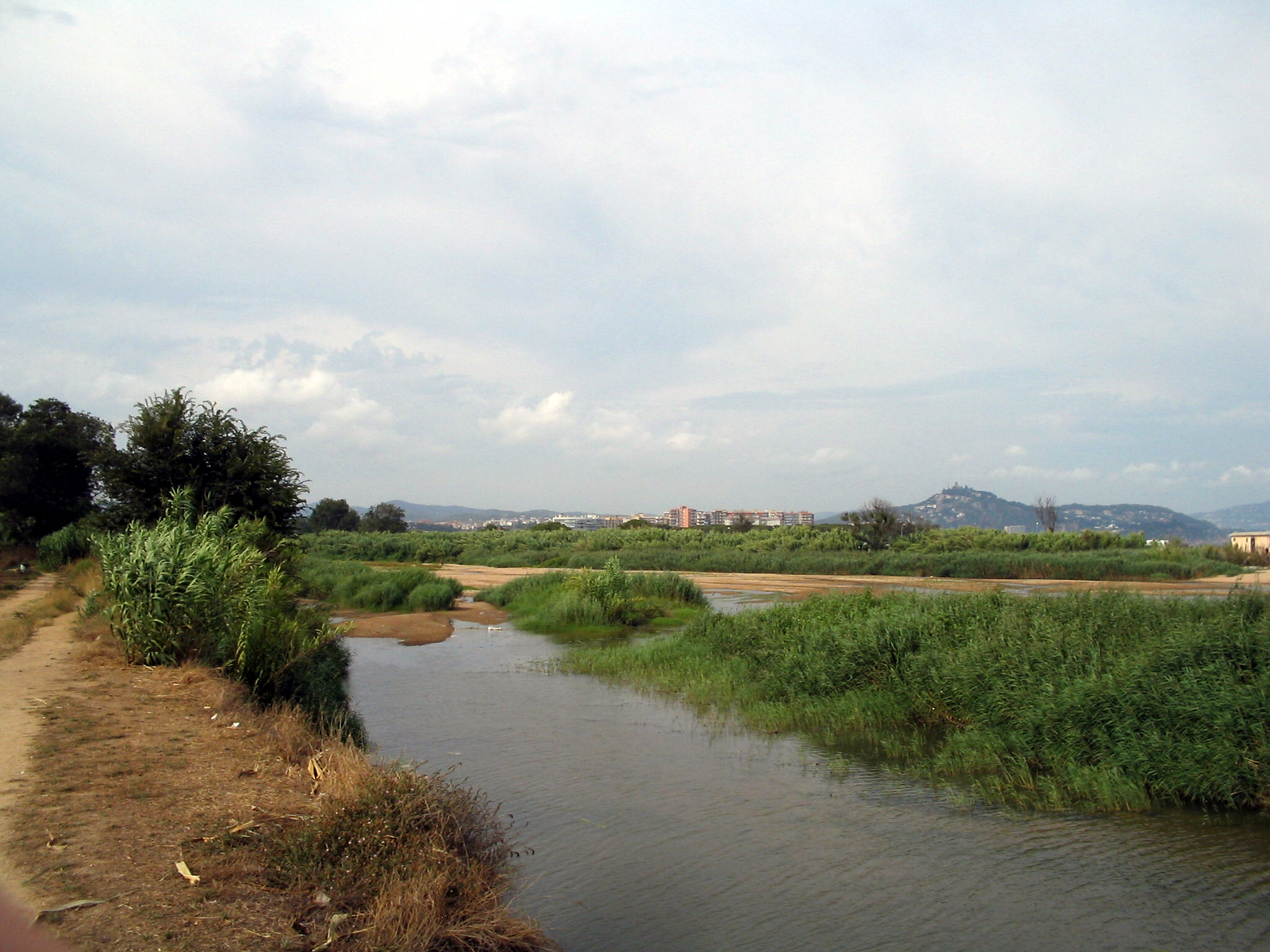
View of the last stretch of the Tordera River where the 242nd MB tried to establish a line of defence but quickly fell apart.

The 242nd Mixed Brigade (Spanish: 242.ª Brigada Mixta), was a short-lived mixed brigade of the Spanish Republican Army in the Spanish Civil War.

Hastily formed in the winter in Catalonia shortly before the end of the war and marred by desertions, it was one of the last mixed brigades to be established.

== History ==
=== Rushed formation of the brigade ===
The decision to establish the 242nd Mixed Brigade was taken towards the end of 1938 in Vic, Catalonia, shortly before the onset of the rebel faction's devastating Catalonia Offensive. During the period of the instruction of the recruits the commanding officer was Militia Major Lucio Doménech Martínez, following which the 242nd Mixed Brigade was hastily sent to the front and the command of the unit went to Militia Major Julio Marín Serrano.

In the face of the atmosphere of panic and demoralization that preceded the relentless advance of the Francoist armies towards the heart of Catalonia, the constitution of this brigade was fraught with difficulties, mainly because of the high number of fugitives among the young men that had been conscripted. Like in all of the mixed brigades of the last period of the Spanish republic, the officers were drafted from the reserve.

=== Failure followed by extinction ===
The 242nd Mixed Brigade was sent to the frontline in January 1939 around the time of the Fall of Barcelona on 27 January 1939. Together with the 77th Division —another ill-prepared and hastily established unit— the brigade tried to establish a defensive line along the lower course of the Tordera River in order to halt the powerful advance of the enemy. But practically all other Republican Army units were rushing north towards the French border and the young and inexperienced 242nd Mixed Brigade was not prepared to fight the massive rebel offensive. Thus the eleventh hour resistance effort ended in disaster.

On 1 February the brigade was overrun; it quickly lost the nearby towns of Hostalric and Blanes without putting much of a fight and one of its battalions even defected to the enemy as a whole.

== See also ==
- 77th Division
- Catalonia Offensive
- Mixed Brigades
