= Santa Fe Reservoir =

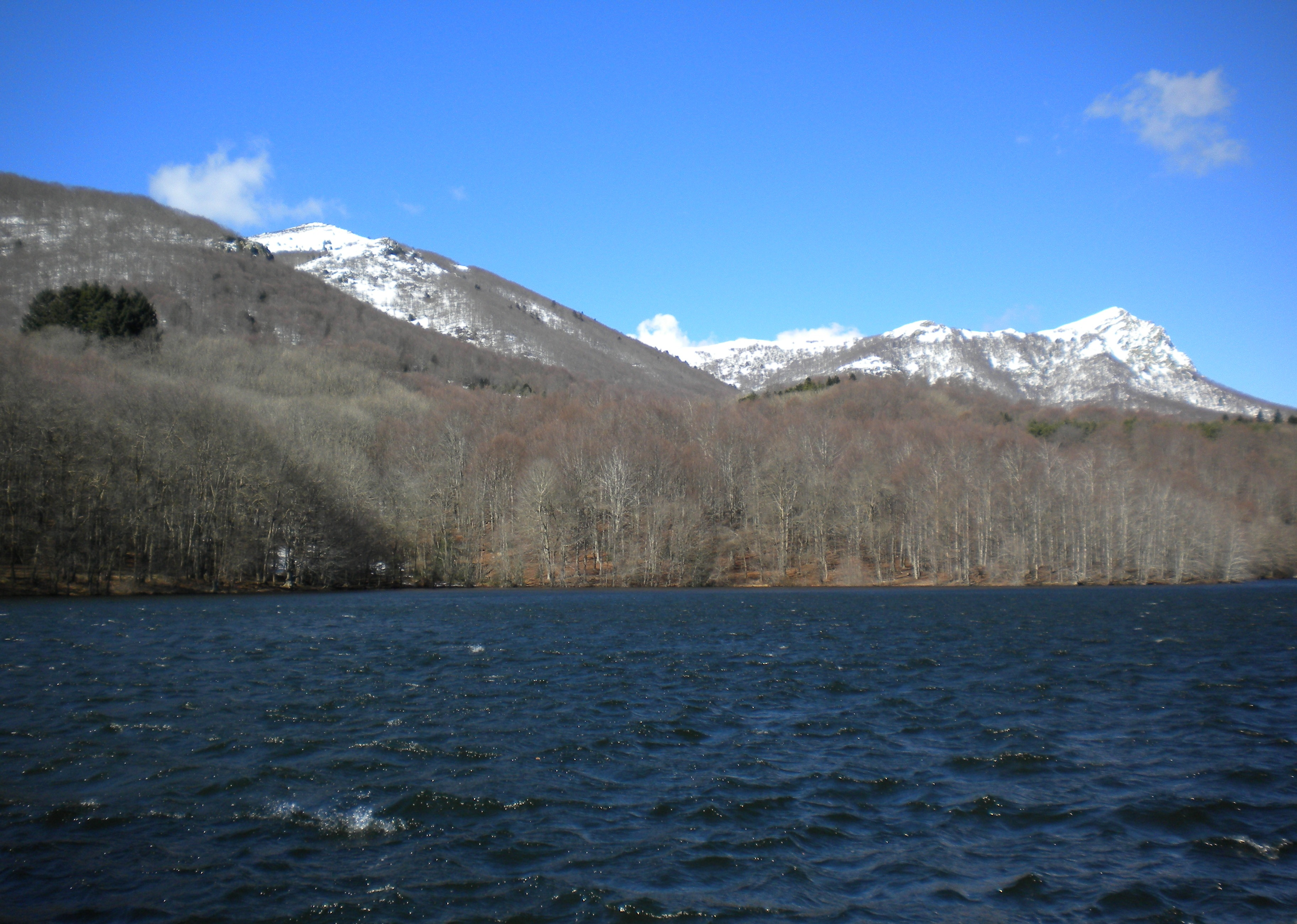
- View of the reservoir in 2010

- Location of the Santa Fe Reservoir
- Official name: Pantà de Santa Fe
- Country: Spain
- Location: Fogars de Montclús, Catalonia
- Coordinates: 41°46′6″N 2°28′14″E
- Status: Operational
- Construction began: 1920
- Opening date: 1935

Dam and spillways
- Type of dam: Arch-gravity dam
- Impounds: Riera de Gualba
- Height: 24 m (79 ft)
- Length: 160 m (520 ft)
- Width (base): 14 m (46 ft)

Reservoir
- Total capacity: 899,000 m³
- Catchment area: 4.5 km²
- Surface area: 6.9 ha

The Santa Fe Reservoir (Catalan: Pantà de Santa Fe) is a reservoir on the Riera de Gualba, a tributary of the Tordera River. It is located within the Fogars de Montclús municipal term, Catalonia, Spain.

The area is a popular destination for excursions and picnics and is easily accessible on foot from the nearest road.

== History ==
At the beginning of the 20th century Ramón de Montaner, a publisher from Barcelona who had the project of building a luxury hotel in the area, bought the Santa Fe valley in the Montseny Range from the Alfaras family of Sant Celoni. Work on the hotel began in 1912 and a little dam was built in order to ensure electricity supply for it. Since the small dam —now known as l'Estanyol— soon revealed itself insufficient, construction work of a second dam began in 1920. Initially the architect was going to be Lluís Domènech i Montaner, Ramón de Montaner's nephew, but in the end the dam was designed by Pere Domènech i Roura.

The Santa Fe dam was built of local granite and ended up being completed in 1935, at the time of the Spanish Republic, shortly before the Civil War. The dam created a reservoir with a storage capacity of 899,000 m³ and also provided electricity for the nearby town of Gualba.

== See also ==
- List of dams and reservoirs in Catalonia
- Montseny Massif
- Santa Fe Dam, California
