= Turó de l'Home =

Mountain in Catalonia, Spain

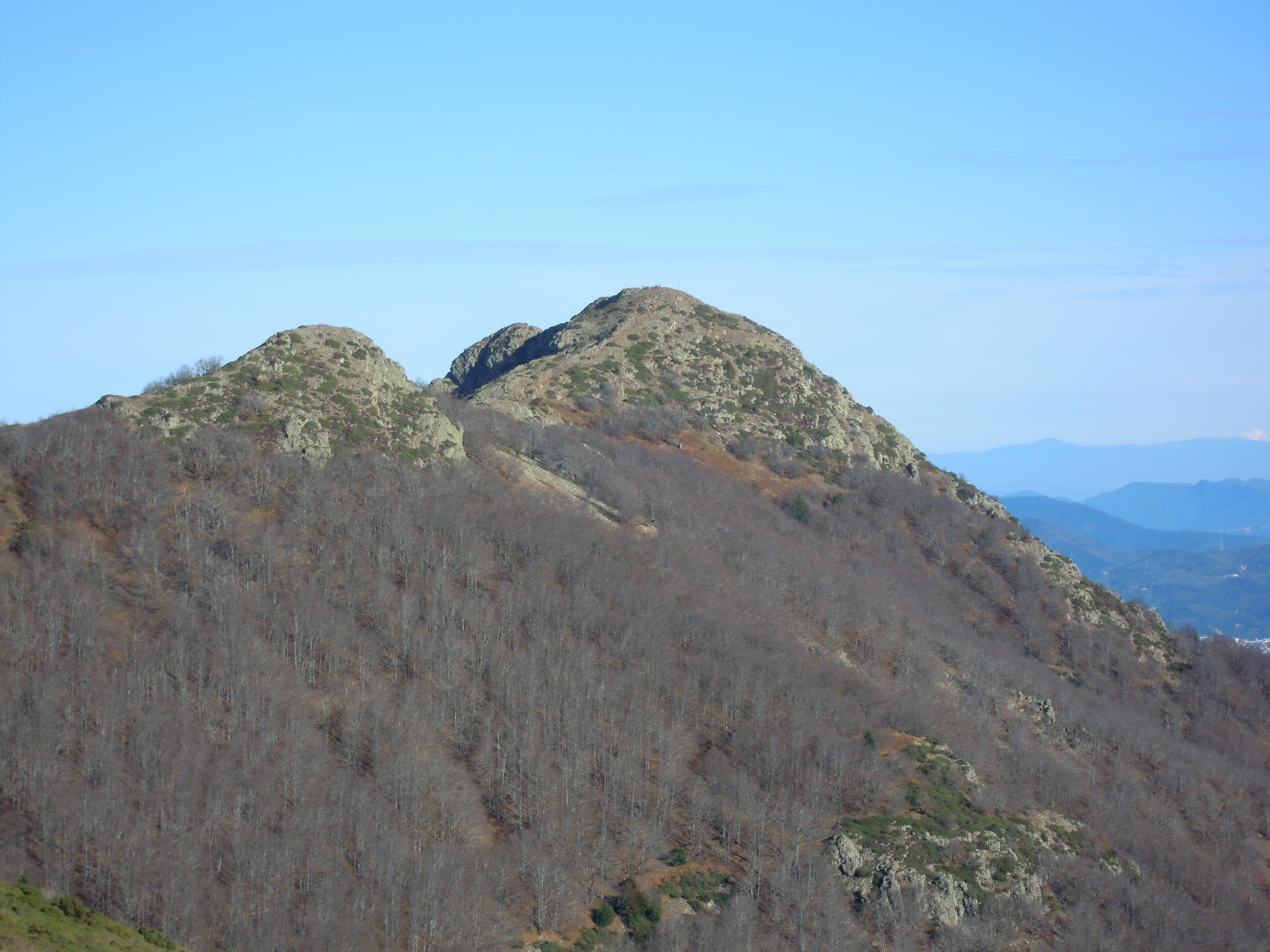

Highest point
- Elevation: 1,705.8 m (5,596 ft)
- Prominence: 1,122 m (3,681 ft)
- Listing: Ribu
- Coordinates: 41°46′21.1″N 2°26′15″E

Geography
- Location: Catalonia, Spain

Turó de l'Home is a mountain of Catalonia, part of the Montseny Massif. With its elevation of 1,705.8 m (5,596 ft) above sea level, it is the highest peak of the Montseny Massif.

The top of the mountain is a triangulation station. (On the image on the right, this station can be seen on the left peak. Only due to the perspective the right peak seems higher. On the right peak some telecommunication infrastructures are installed.) A paved road leads almost up to peak until Plana Amagada, where there is plenty of parking. The last 1,500 metres of the road are closed for motorized traffic but open for cyclists and hikers. The final ascent to the triangulation station, some 50 metres above the endpoint of the road, is a step trail.

The Turó de l'Home was the site of the 1959 Transair Douglas Dakota accident.

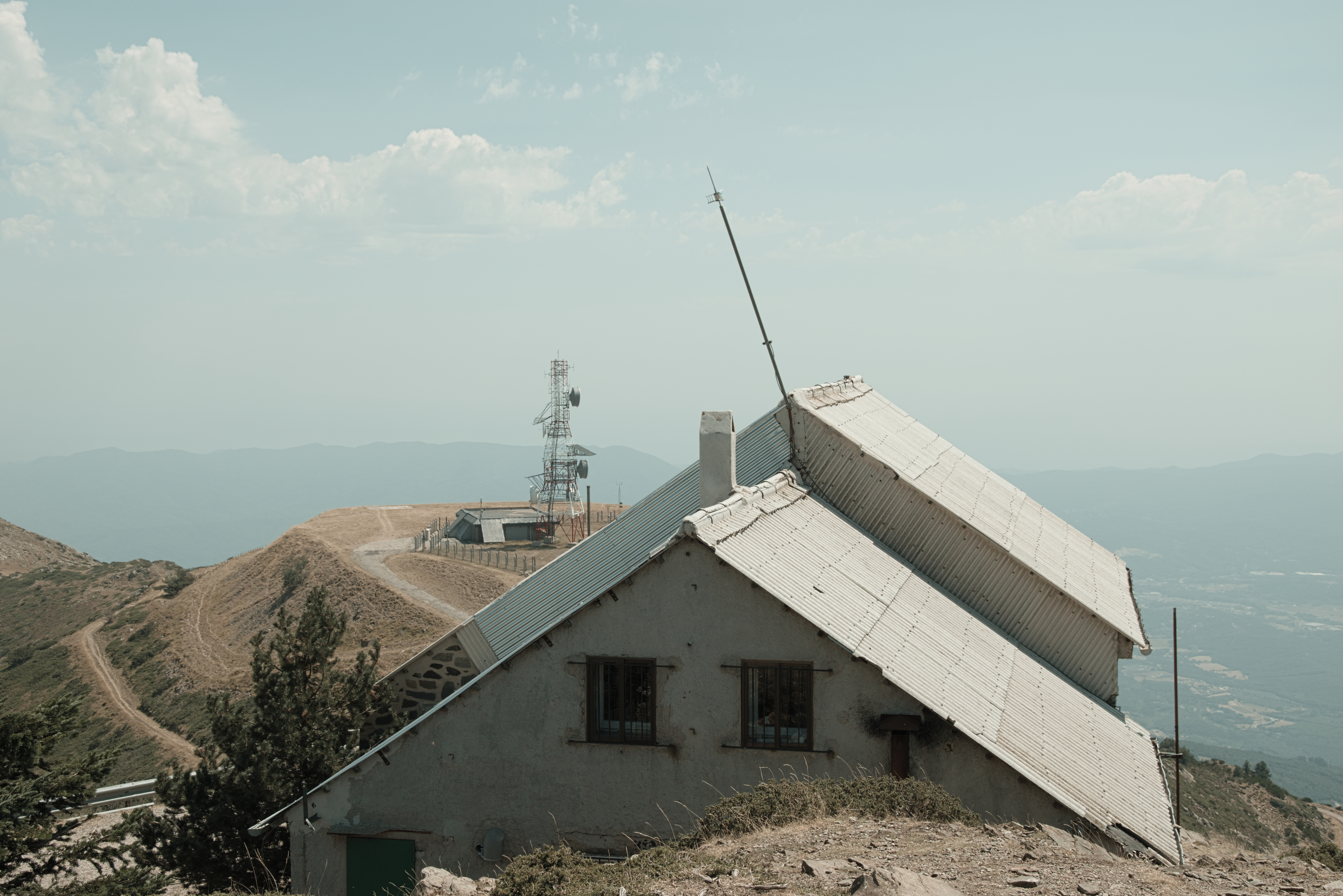
Meteorological Observatory at the top of the Turó de l'Home in the Montseny Massif

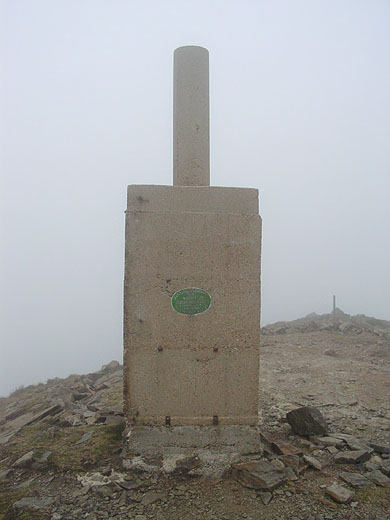
Triangulation station at the peak of the Turó de l'Home

== See also ==
- Mountains of Catalonia
