= Tordera (river) =

River in Catalonia, Spain

Coordinates: 41°46′40″N 2°24′02″E

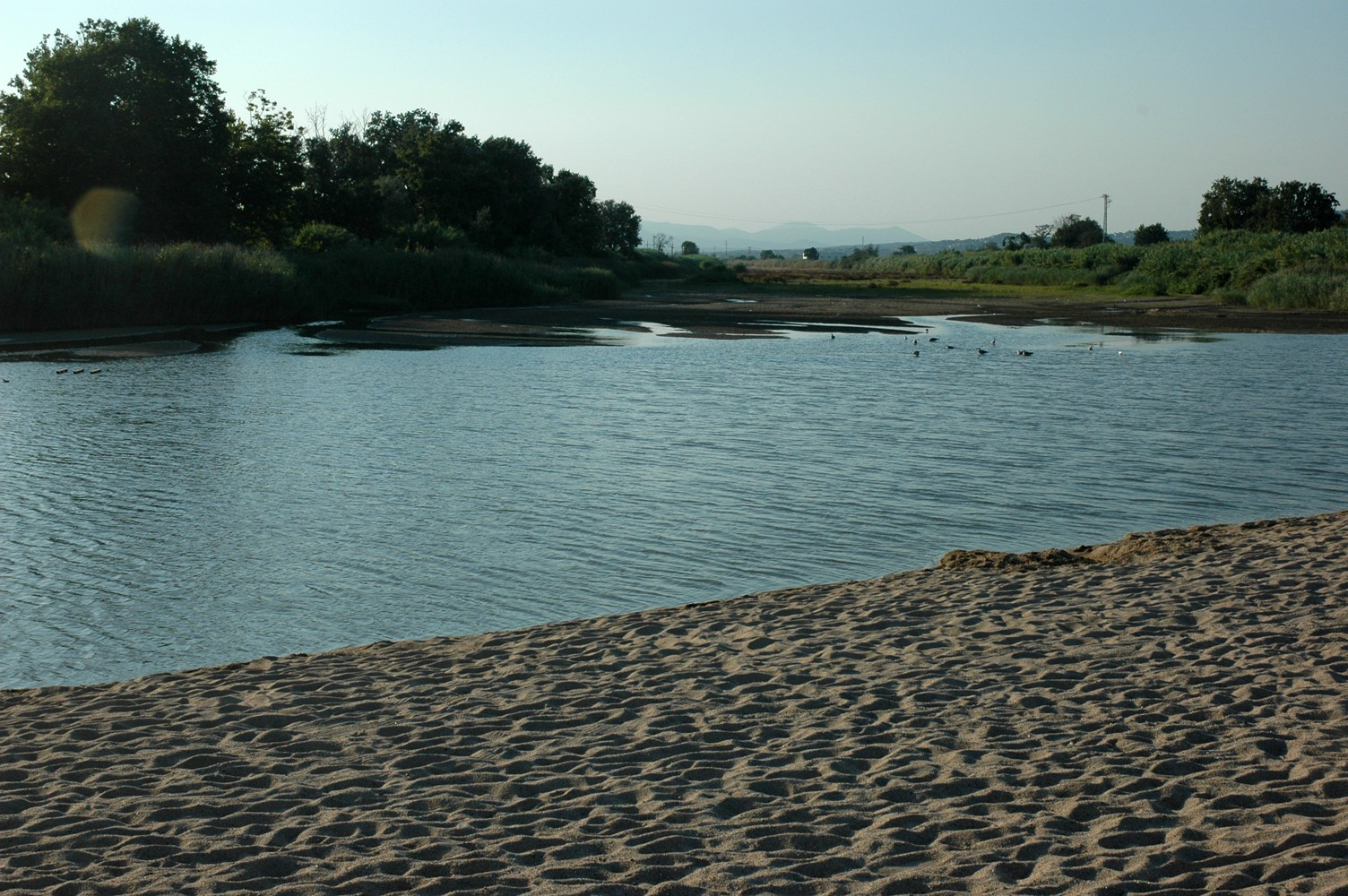
- Mouth of the Tordera between Blanes and Malgrat de Mar

Location
- Country: Spain

Physical characteristics
- Source
  - location: Montseny Massif
  - elevation: 1,500 m (4,900 ft)
- Mouth
  - location: Mediterranean
  - elevation: 0 m (0 ft)
- Length: 55 km (34 mi)
- Basin size: 894 km^{2} (345 sq mi)
- Discharge
  - average: 5.01 m^{3}/s (177 cu ft/s)

The Tordera (Catalan pronunciation: [tuɾˈðeɾə]; Catalan: La Tordera) is a river of Catalonia (Spain). It flows through the town of Tordera.

== Course ==
The river is 55 kilometres (34 mi) long. Its source is in the Montseny Massif, and it discharges in the Mediterranean Sea. The river's average discharge is 5.01 cubic metres per second (177 cu ft/s).

Its main tributaries are the Riera de Gualba, Riera de Arbúcies, Riera de Santa Coloma and the Riera de Valmanya. The river runs through the protected areas of the Parc Natural del Montseny and the Parc Natural del Montnegre i el Corredor.

The last stretch of the Tordera is a wide sandy bed subject to seasonal flow. The brackish lagoon in its final delta area is an important area for migratory birds.

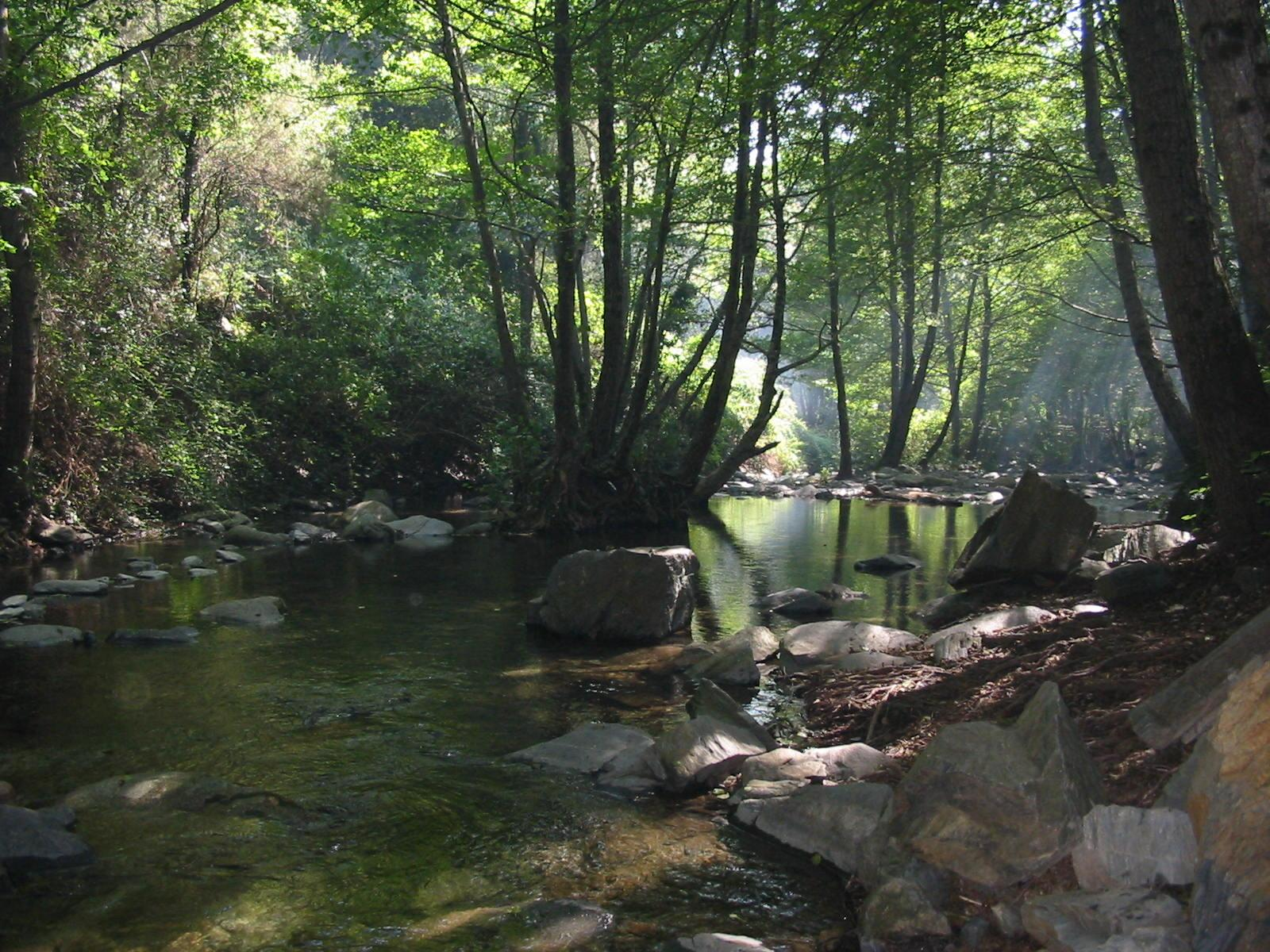
The Tordera in the Montseny near its sources

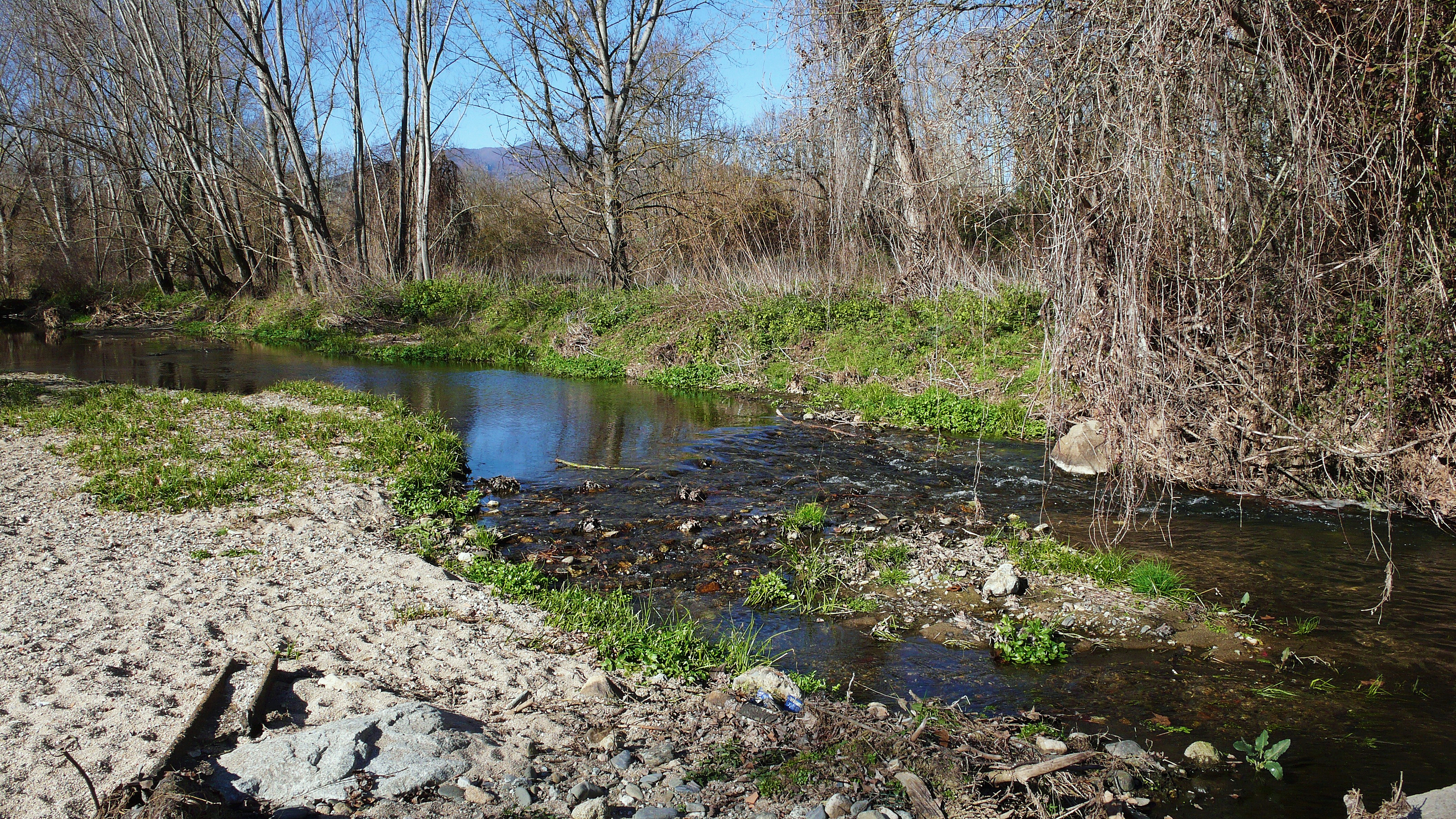
The Tordera River close to Sant Celoni

== History ==
In the last week of January 1939 the 77th Division of the Spanish Republican Army, together with the 242nd Mixed Brigade —which had not been ascribed to any division—, tried to establish a planned defensive line along the course of the Tordera River in order to halt the massive rebel offensive. The units took position along the course of the river east of the Montseny Massif on 27 January.

The effort, however, proved futile and in practice it became impossible for the Republican forces to put up any meaningful resistance, especially since the young, inexperienced and ill-equipped 242rd Mixed Brigade —posted at the lower course of the river— was not prepared for the battle and quickly fell into disarray and was overrun. In the face of the powerful and steady enemy advance the 77th Division abandoned the defensive line along the Tordera and withdrew to the town of Vic, which it lost on 1 February.

== See also ==
- Montseny brook newt
- List of rivers of Catalonia
- List of rivers of Spain
- Santa Fe Reservoir
