= Transair (UK) =

British airline

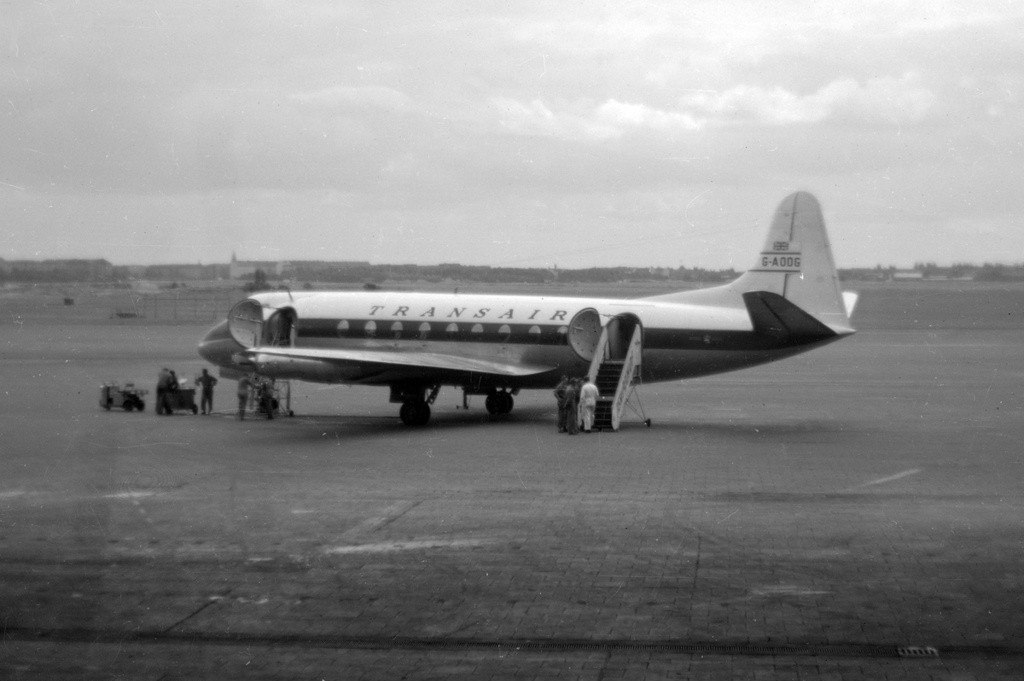
- Vickers Viscount 700
- Founded: February 1947
- Commenced operations: April 1947
- Ceased operations: 1960 (member of Airwork group; merged with Hunting-Clan Air Transport to form British United; Airways)
- Hubs: Croydon Airport (1947 — April 1958); London Gatwick Airport (May 1958 — 1960)
- Fleet size: 13 aircraft (2 Vickers Viscount 800 series, 11 Douglas DC-3 [as of April 1958])
- Destinations: British Isles; Europe
- Headquarters: Croydon Airport (1947 — April 1958); London Gatwick Airport (May 1958 — 1960)
- Key people: G.H. Freeman, C.W. Bebb, H.S. Perren

Transair Ltd was an early post-World War II private, independent (Note: independent from government-owned corporations) British airline formed in 1947. It began as an air taxi operator at Croydon Airport. In 1953, it started inclusive tour (IT) charter flights. In September 1956, Transair became part of the Airwork group. The following year it shifted its operating base and headquarters to Gatwick Airport. In 1960, Transair was merged into British United Airways (BUA), as a result of the Airwork — Hunting-Clan merger.

== History ==
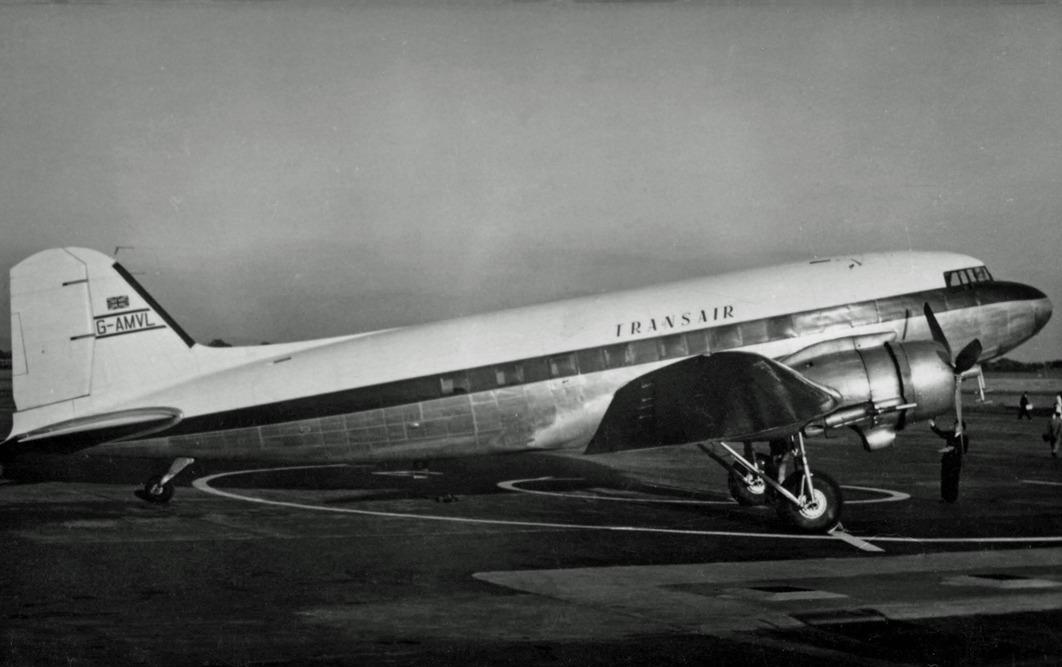
Douglas C-47B Dakota at Manchester (Ringway) Airport in 1953.

On 12 February 1947, former Royal Air Force pilot Gerald "Gerry" Freeman founded Transair Ltd. as an air taxi operator at Croydon Airport (London's pre-WWII main airport). The first flight operations were started in the following month of April. In November 1949 a few schedules were started, even if all on BEA behalf, followed by a few own ones in April 1950.

Following a difficult start, in Britain's poor economic conditions, the airline became very profitable by specialising in distributing newspapers. By 1952, the number of annual newspaper delivery flights using Avro Ansons exceeded 3,000. Transair's newspaper flights also established industry performance standards.

In 1953, Transair began flying British holidaymakers to sunnier climes in the Mediterranean following the signing of its first IT charter contract with Vladimir Raitz's Horizon Holidays. By that time, the airline's fleet was ten Douglas DC-3 Dakota piston airliners. Although all of these were second-hand, they were immaculately maintained.

By late 1956, Freeman was planning to shift Transair's operating base and headquarters from Croydon to Gatwick and to replace some of the ageing Dakotas with three brand new Vickers Viscount 800 series turboprops. He was also planning to build a new hangar at Gatwick for £300,000. Although he had £500,000 in retained profits, he needed a further £1m for the planned investment. Freeman's search for finance led to an offer from Airwork to buy him out. Airwork also offered to leave him in control of Transair and to give him a seat on the board of Airwork's holding company. Freeman's accepted Airwork's offer and Transair became an Airwork subsidiary in the month of September. During that time, the War Office invited new tenders for trooping flight contracts to Europe and the Far East, as a consequence of the Government's growing dissatisfaction with the operational performance and high costs of the ageing Handley Page Hermes fleet that was contracted from Airwork, Britavia and Skyways to operate most of these flights. The War Office awarded Transair the European contract, which was to be operated with the new Viscounts the airline had on order. The contract was to become effective from 1958.

By the time Transair joined Airwork Group, its operations encompassed the Viscount trooping contract between the United Kingdom and the Western Mediterranean, intensive mail and freight services under long-term charter contracts, IT flights, ad hoc night charters and a seasonal London—Jersey scheduled service.

In May 1958, Transair shifted its entire operation from Croydon to Gatwick. By that time, its fleet consisted of three Viscounts and ten Dakotas. On 30 May 1958, Transair operated the first commercial air service from Gatwick. Transair's Viscount 804 G-AOXU was the first aircraft of its type to be based at the airport. This was also the time the process of merging the Airwork-controlled airlines with Hunting-Clan to form BUA had started.

During 1959, Transair recorded a profit of £400,000, as a result of which it became Airwork's most profitable subsidiary. Freeman's rigid attention to detail and the good systems he had put in place made Transair the most efficient Airwork Group airline. This in turn made Transair's financial performance superior to other Airwork subsidiary airlines. In 1959 Airwork also took over Air Charter, Freddie Laker's first airline venture. Following this takeover, the Airwork board put Freeman in charge of the entire group's UK and European short-haul operations. As part of this deal, Transair took over the management of all the group's UK regional services, leaving Laker to concentrate on the group's long-haul trooping flights and other long-distance charter services.

By the time Airwork merged with Hunting-Clan to form BUA in July 1960, the former's air transport subsidiaries already included Airwork Helicopters, Air Charter, Bristow Helicopters, Channel Air Bridge, Transair and Morton Air Services.

== Fleet ==
In April 1958, the Transair fleet comprised 13 aircraft.

Aircraft type	Number
Vickers Viscount 804	2
Douglas DC-3	11

== Accidents and incidents ==
There are four recorded accidents involving Transair aircraft, but only one was fatal.

1. 2 September 1948 - Airspeed AS.65 Consul (registered G-AIUZ) crashed near Berne (Switzerland). No fatalities.
2. 10 February 1950 - Avro Anson (registered G-AJBA) destroyed by fire after crashing at Montge (France). No fatalities.
3. 17 February 1952 - Avro Anson (registered G-ALFD) crashed into buildings while landing at Brussels airport in dense fog. Aircraft operated by Dennis Aviation. No fatalities.
4. 19 August 1959 - Douglas DC-3 (registered G-AMZD) on a non-scheduled flight from Barcelona, operating under visual flight rules crashed into Mount Montseny in the Catalan Pre-Coastal Range after entering cloud, killing all 32 occupants.

== See also ==
- List of defunct airlines of the United Kingdom

== Notes ==
Notes

Citations

== Sources ==
- Eglin, Roger & Ritchie, Berry (1980). Fly me, I'm Freddie. London, UK: Weidenfeld and Nicolson. ISBN 0-297-77746-7.
- Skyport — Gatwick edition (Cooper, B., Got your number, Golden Gatwick, p. 12), 6 June 2008. Hounslow, UK.
