= Puig Drau =

Highest point
- Elevation: 1,345 m (4,413 ft)
- Coordinates: 41°45′52.48″N 2°20′53.89″E

Geography
- Location: Osona, Catalonia
- Parent range: Montseny

Climbing
- First ascent: Unknown

Puig Drau is a mountain of the Montseny Massif, Catalonia, Spain. It has an elevation of 1,345 metres above sea level. This mountain is located within the municipal limits of El Brull, Osona.

== See also ==
- Montseny
- Mountains of Catalonia
