= Fogars de Montclús =

- Municipality
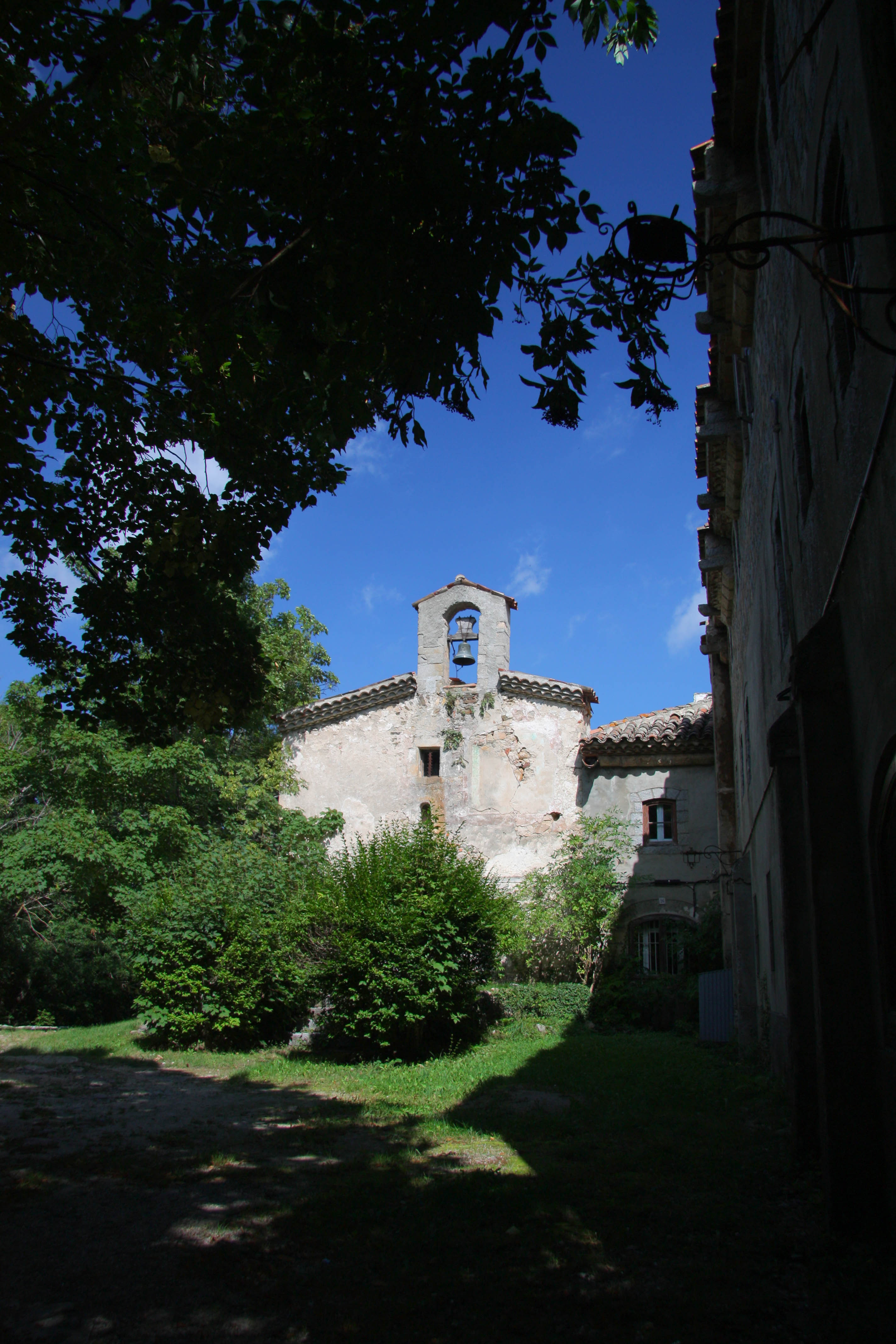

- Coat of arms

- Location in Catalonia Fogars de Montclús (Spain)
- Coordinates: 41°43′43″N 2°26′40″E
- Country: Spain
- Community: Catalonia
- Province: Barcelona
- Comarca: Vallès Oriental

Government
  - Mayor: Albert Rovira Rovira (2015)

Area
  - Total: 39.7 km^{2} (15.3 sq mi)

Population (2025-01-01)
  - Total: 494
  - Density: 12.4/km^{2} (32.2/sq mi)
- Website: fogarsdemontclus.cat

Fogars de Montclús (Catalan pronunciation: [fuˈɣaz ðə ˌmoŋˈklus]) is a municipality in the province of Barcelona and autonomous community of Catalonia, Spain. The municipality covers an area of 39.02 square kilometres (15.07 sq mi) and the population in 2014 was 482.

== See also ==
- Montseny Massif
- Santa Fe Reservoir
