= 245th Brigade =

245th Brigade may refer to:

- 245th Weapons and Equipment Storage Base, Russia
- 245th Mixed Brigade, Spain

== See also ==
- 245th Regiment (disambiguation)
