= Tsybin RSR =

1959 reconnaissance aircraft prototype by Tsybin

RSR
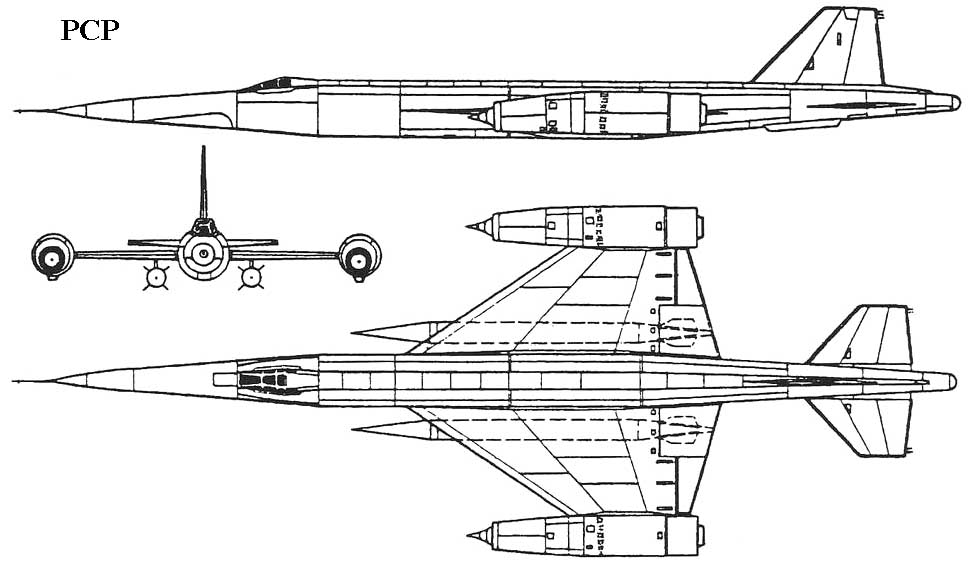
- Orthographically projected diagram of the Tsybin RSR

General information
- Type: Reconnaissance aircraft
- Manufacturer: Tsybin OKB-256
- Designer: P. V. Tsybin
- Status: Prototype/project
- Primary user: USSR
- Number built: 0

History
- Manufactured: 1 (Prototype)
- First flight: 7 April 1959 (Prototype)

The Tsybin RSR (Reactivnyy Strategicheskiy Razvedchik, Cyrillic Реактивный Стратегический Разведчик, Russian for "jet strategic reconnaissance") was a Soviet design for an advanced, long-range, Mach 3 strategic reconnaissance aircraft.

== Development and design ==
In 1954, the design bureau headed by Pavel Tsybin started development of a ramjet-powered supersonic strategic bomber, the RS. This design proved impracticable, and a smaller derivative, the 2RS was proposed, which would achieve intercontinental range by being air-launched from a modified Tupolev Tu-95 bomber.

This too was unsuccessful, with the aircraft unable to return to base if used on an intercontinental mission, while being incapable of carrying a thermonuclear bomb. The design was therefore revised again to a reconnaissance aircraft capable of operating from conventional runways, the RSR. Because ramjets could not be used for take-off, they were replaced by turbofans.

The RSR was primarily of aluminium construction, with a long circular-section fuselage, which housed a pressurized cabin for the pilot together with cameras and fuel, with thin, low-aspect-ratio trapezoidal wings. The engines, two Soloviev D-21 turbofans, were mounted at the tips of the wings. The aircraft had a bicycle undercarriage, with outriggers under the engine nacelles. It was planned to cruise at greater than Mach 2 at a height of 20,000 m (65,600 ft) giving a range of 3,760 km (2,340 mi).

A simplified, full-sized aerodynamic prototype for the novel layout, the NM-1 was built in 1957. Intended for low-speed handling tests, the NM-1 had a steel-tube fuselage with duraluminium and plywood skinning. This aircraft, powered by two Mikulin AM-5 turbojets first flew on 7 April 1959. Based on the results of these trials, the RSR was redesigned (as the R-020) to make it more manoeuvrable at high altitude (it was proposed to carry out barrel rolls to avoid surface-to-air missiles). More conventional Tumansky R-11 turbojets (the engine used in the MiG-21) replaced the unavailable Soloviev turbofans. Five R-020 airframes were virtually complete, only awaiting engines by April 1961, with another 10 planned, when Soviet Premier Nikita Khrushchev cancelled the program.

== Specifications (R-020) ==
Data from Soviet X-Planes, The Osprey Encyclopedia of Russian Aircraft 1875–1995

General characteristics

- Crew: 1
- Length: 28 m (91 ft 10 in)
- Wingspan: 10.66 m (35 ft 0 in)
- Wing area: 64 m^{2} (690 sq ft)
- Empty weight: 9,100 kg (20,062 lb)
- Gross weight: 19,870 kg (43,806 lb)
- Fuel capacity: 10,700 kg (23,589 lb)
- Powerplant: 2 × Tumansky R-11F turbojet engines, 38.64 kN (8,686 lbf) thrust each dry, 60.65 kN (13,635 lbf) with afterburner

Performance

- Maximum speed: 2,600 km/h (1,600 mph, 1,400 kn) at 12,000 m (39,000 ft)
- Maximum speed: Mach 2.44
- Range: 4,000 km (2,500 mi, 2,200 nmi)
- Service ceiling: 22,500 m (73,800 ft)
- Take-off run: 1,200 m (3,900 ft)
- Landing run: 800 m (2,600 ft) with brake parachute

== See also ==
Aircraft of comparable role, configuration, and era

- Bristol 188
- Lockheed A-12
