= Main line of resistance =

Military defensive position

A main line of resistance (MLR) is the most important defensive position of an army facing an opposing force over an extended front. It does not consist of one trench or line of pillboxes, but rather a system, of varying degrees of complexity, of fighting positions and obstacles to slow enemy advances.

== Definition ==
The United States Department of Defense defines main line of resistance as follows:

A line at the forward edge of the battle position, designated for the purpose of coordinating the fire of all units and supporting weapons, including air and naval gunfire. It defines the forward limits of a series of mutually supporting defensive areas, but it does not include the areas occupied or used by covering or screening forces.

== History of concept ==
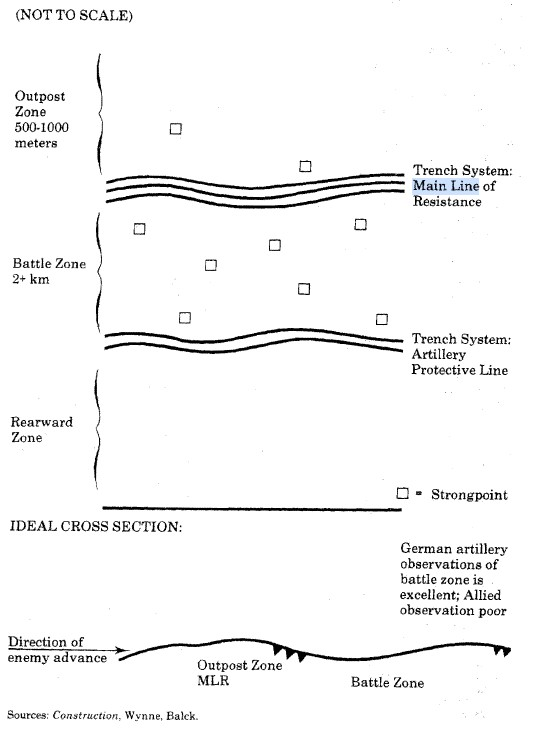
German defense in depth concept (1916)

The term first came into use on the Western Front of World War I, after fighting became stalemated. On 1 December 1916, the German General Staff (Oberste Heeresleitung or OHL) published The Principles of Command in the Defensive Battle in Position Warfare, by two general staff officers, Hermann Geyer and Max Bauer, which described the principles of an elastic defense in depth.

Under this concept, there were three zones: an outpost zone, a battle zone and a rearward zone. The lightly held outpost zone was there to provide warnings of attacks and repel enemy raids and patrols. Behind them was the main line of resistance, usually consisting of three successive trench lines. Where possible, the outpost zone was located on a forward slope and the main line on a reverse slope, obscured from direct observation by the enemy. Although this restricted the range of the defensive weapons, this was offset by the advantage of concealment, and the ability to surprise an attacker. The rearward zone consisted of another trench line 1,500 to 3,000 metres (4,900 to 9,800 ft) behind the MLR, depending on the terrain. It was not expected that the MLR could be held against a determined attack, only disrupt one, but a counterattack would be mounted from the rearward zone. The German pamphlet was translated into English and adopted by the British Expeditionary Force for the defensive battles of 1918.

During World War II, in which combat was relatively fluid, the term main line of resistance was used less often, and the positions the term described were usually less deep and complex than in World War I. However, there were exceptions, such as the French Maginot Line and Mareth Line, the German Westwall (Siegfried Line to the Allies), and the Soviet Stalin Line. After the Korean War became static in 1951, MLR described the defensive positions of the US Eighth Army, a series of trenches and bunkers extending east to west across the Korean peninsula.
