= Montseny Massif =

Mountain range in Catalonia, Spain

Montseny
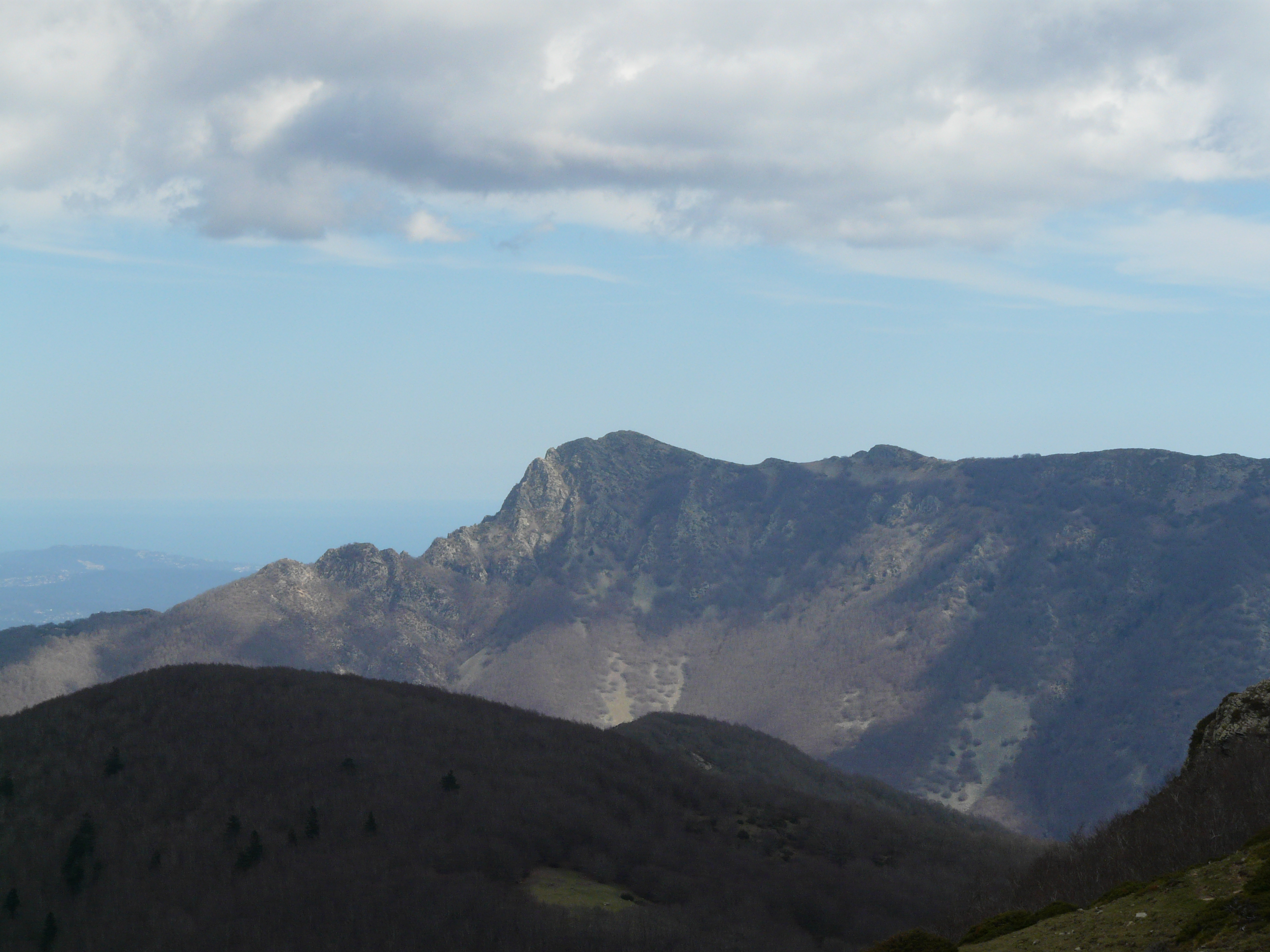
- Les Agudes seen from the summit of El Matagalls

Highest point
- Elevation: 1,706 m (5,597 ft)
- Coordinates: 41°47′36″N 2°24′11″E

Geography
- Location within Catalonia
- Location: Vallès Oriental, la Selva, Osona; Catalonia
- Parent range: Catalan Pre-Coastal Range

Geology
- Mountain type(s): Sedimentary rock layers over igneous and metamorphic rocks

Montseny (Catalan pronunciation: [munˈsɛɲ]) is a mountain range west of the coastal hills north of Barcelona. It is part of the Catalan Pre-Coastal Range.

== Features ==
The Montseny massif is located within a triangle formed by the AP-7, C-17 and C-25 roads. It has the highest mountains in the area south of the Pyrenees and dominates the plains south of Girona. To the south lies the plateau of La Calma. In between is the Valley of the Tordera River.

The highest peaks are Turó de l'Home (1,712 m), Les Agudes (1,703 m), El Matagalls (1,697 m) and Puig Drau (1,344 m).

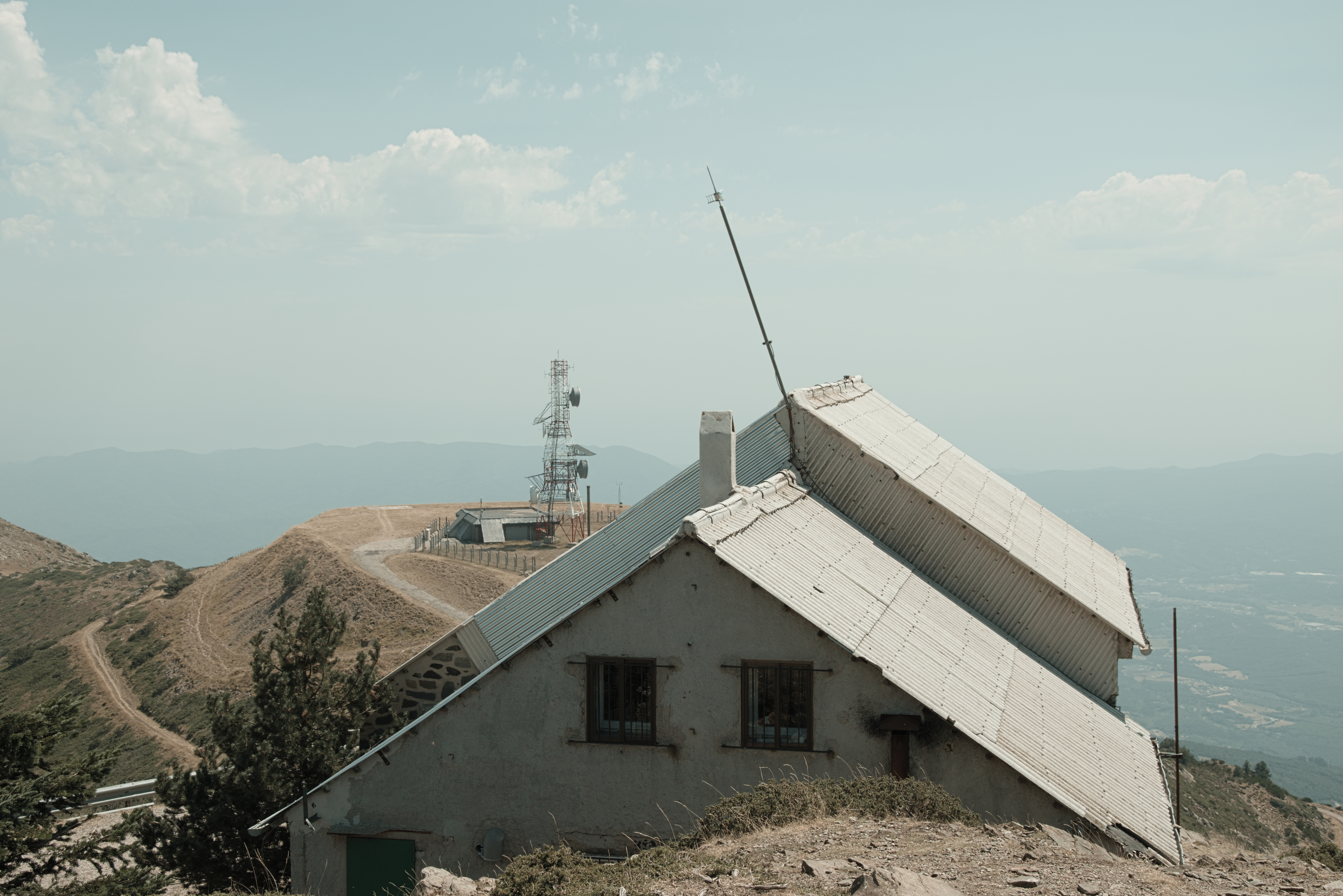
Meteorological Observatory at the top of the Turó de l'Home in the Montseny Massif

There are a large number of megalithic structures in the massif, such as menhirs, indicating that the area was inhabited since very ancient times.

The Santa Fe Reservoir is located in the area of the range; construction work began in 1920 and was completed in 1935.

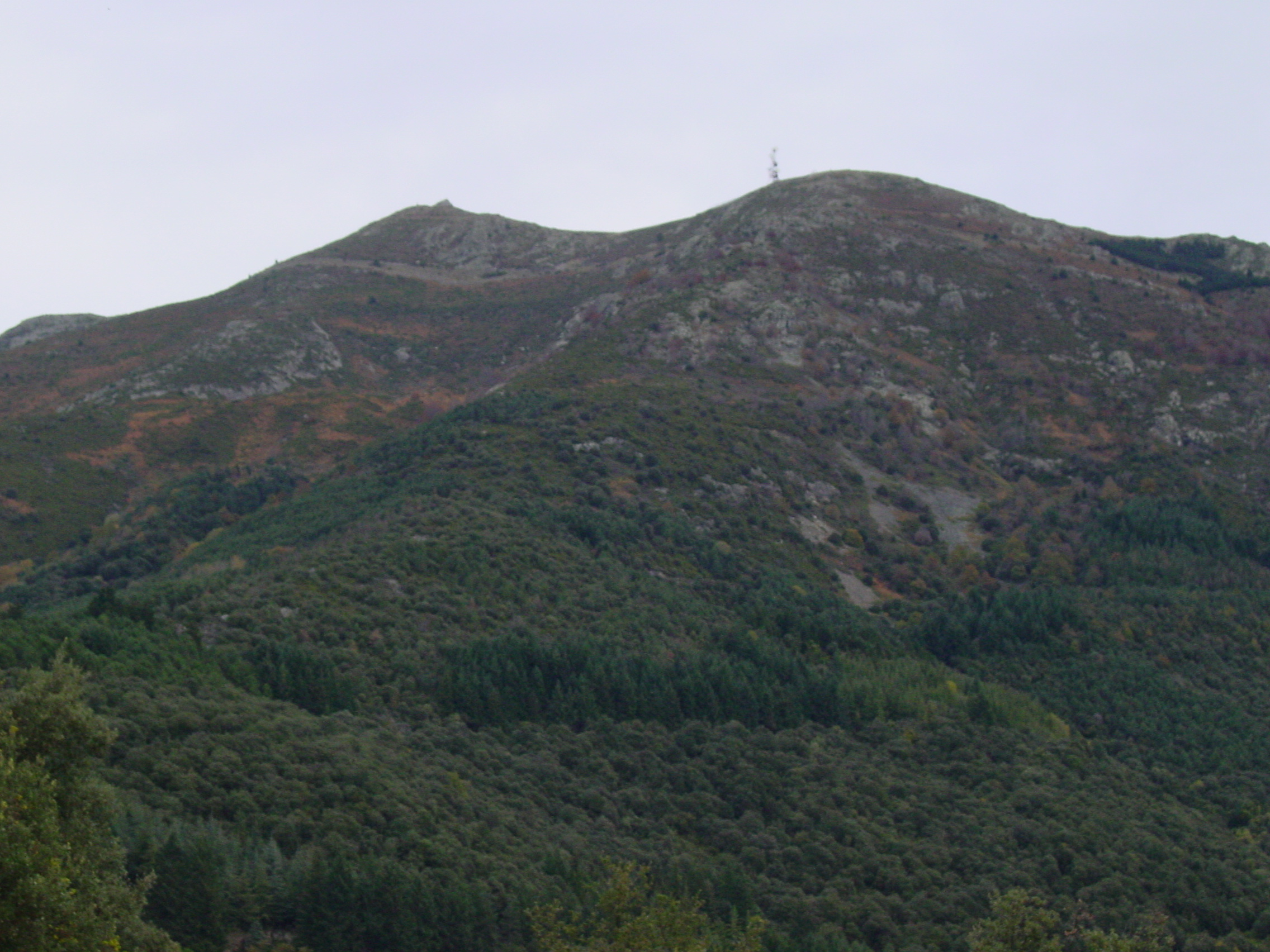
North face of the Turó de l'Home, the highest summit of the range

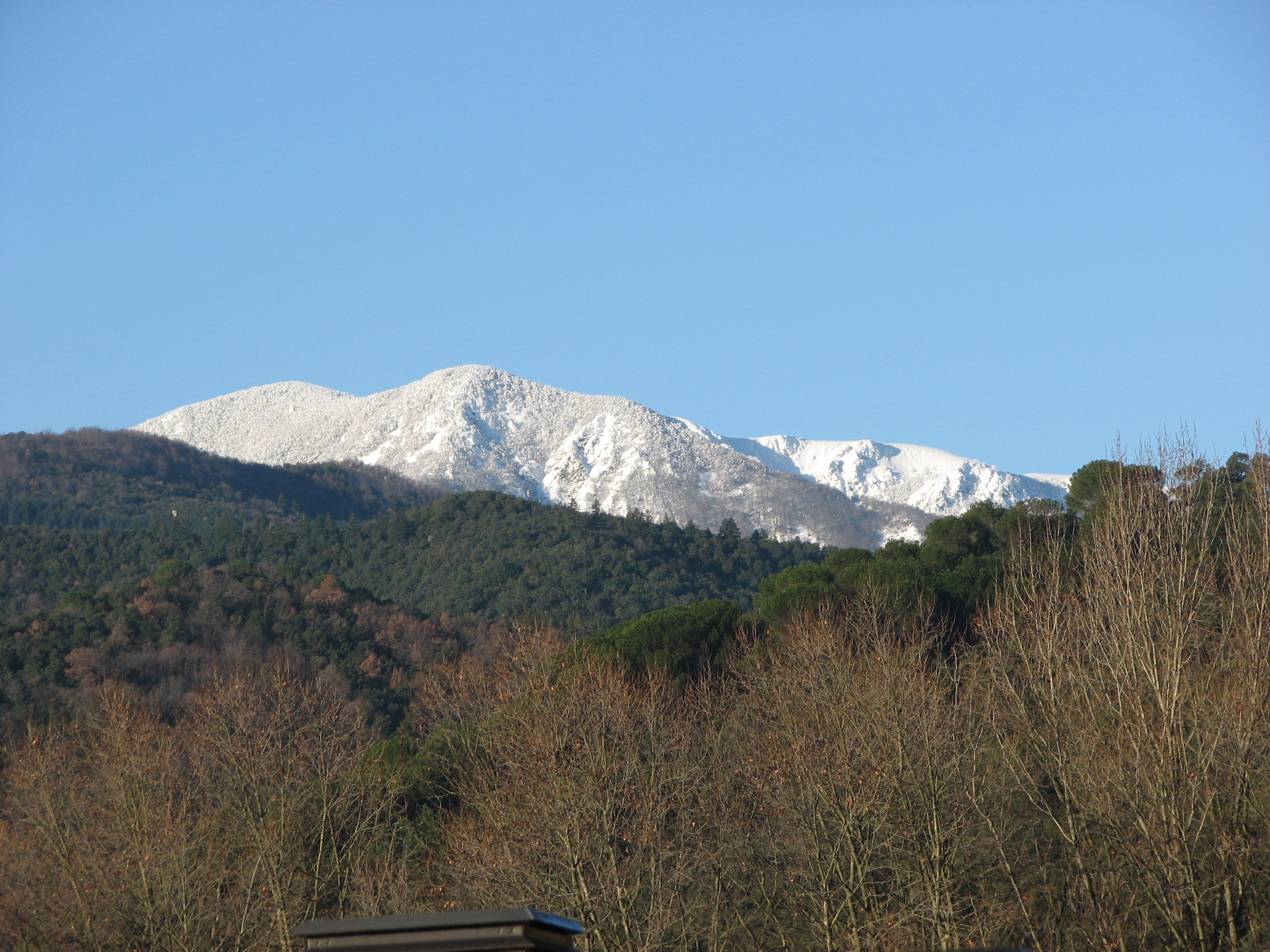
The massive Matagalls seen from Arbúcies.

== Ecology ==
The Montseny is a protected area, UNESCO designated the massif a biosphere reserve in 1978. The Generalitat of Catalonia regional government designated it a natural park in 1987, the Montseny Natural Park (Parc Natural del Montseny).

The Park is home to a wide variety of fauna from Mediterranean to alpine. The critically endangered Montseny brook newt is only known from the area of this massif.
