= List of mountains in Catalonia =

This is a list of mountains in Catalonia, Spain.

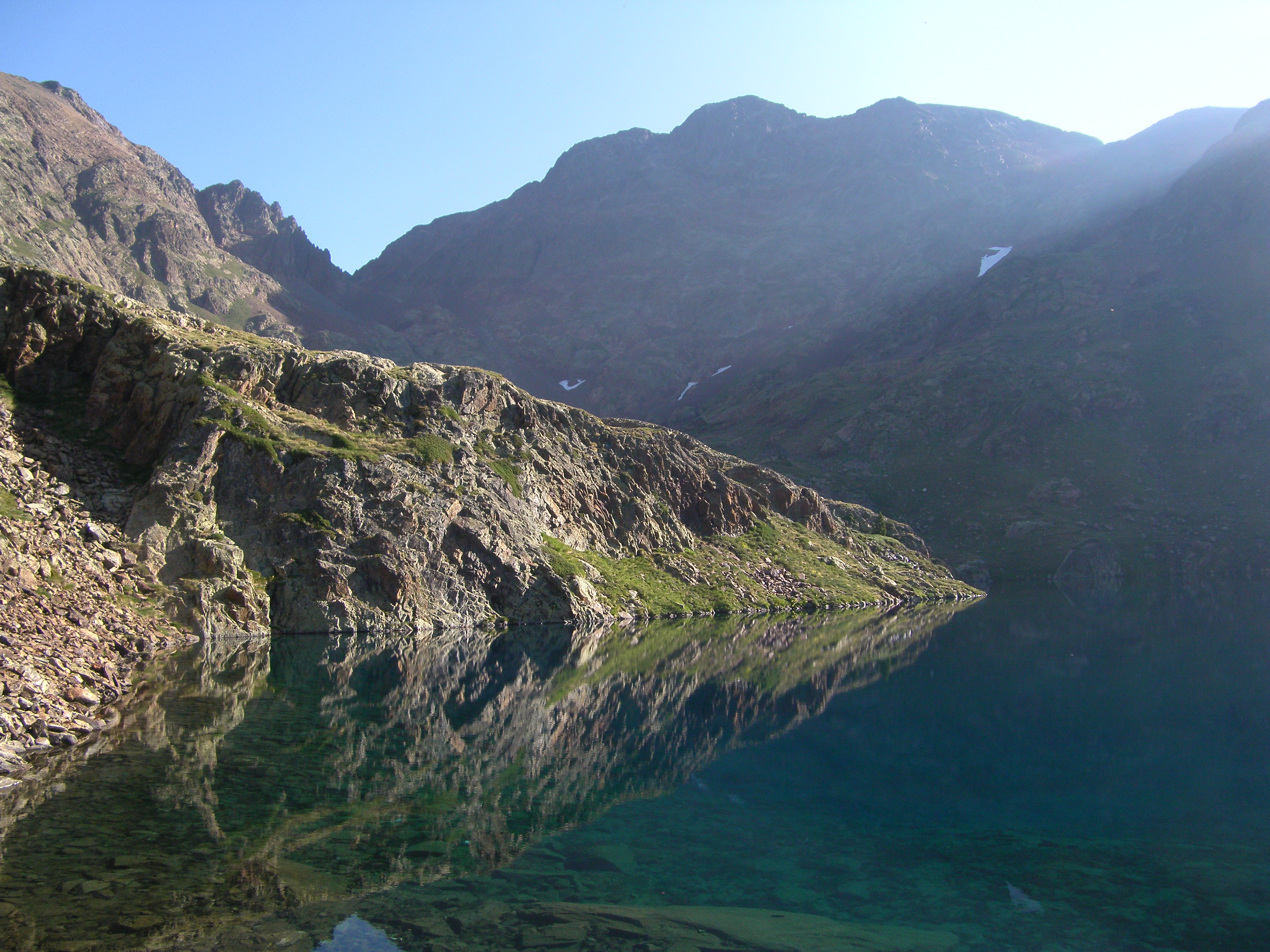
Pica d'Estats from l'estany d'Estats

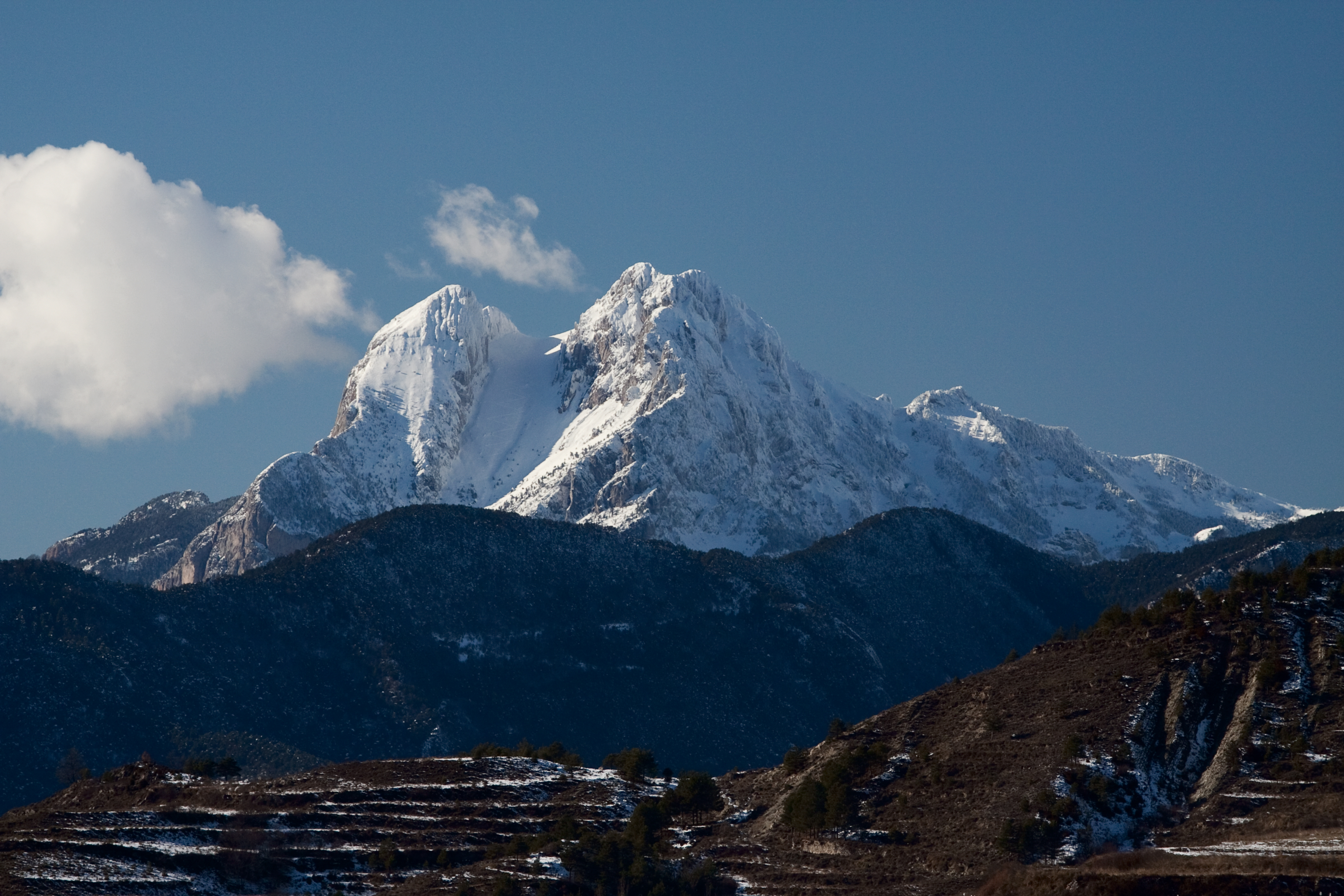
Pedraforca

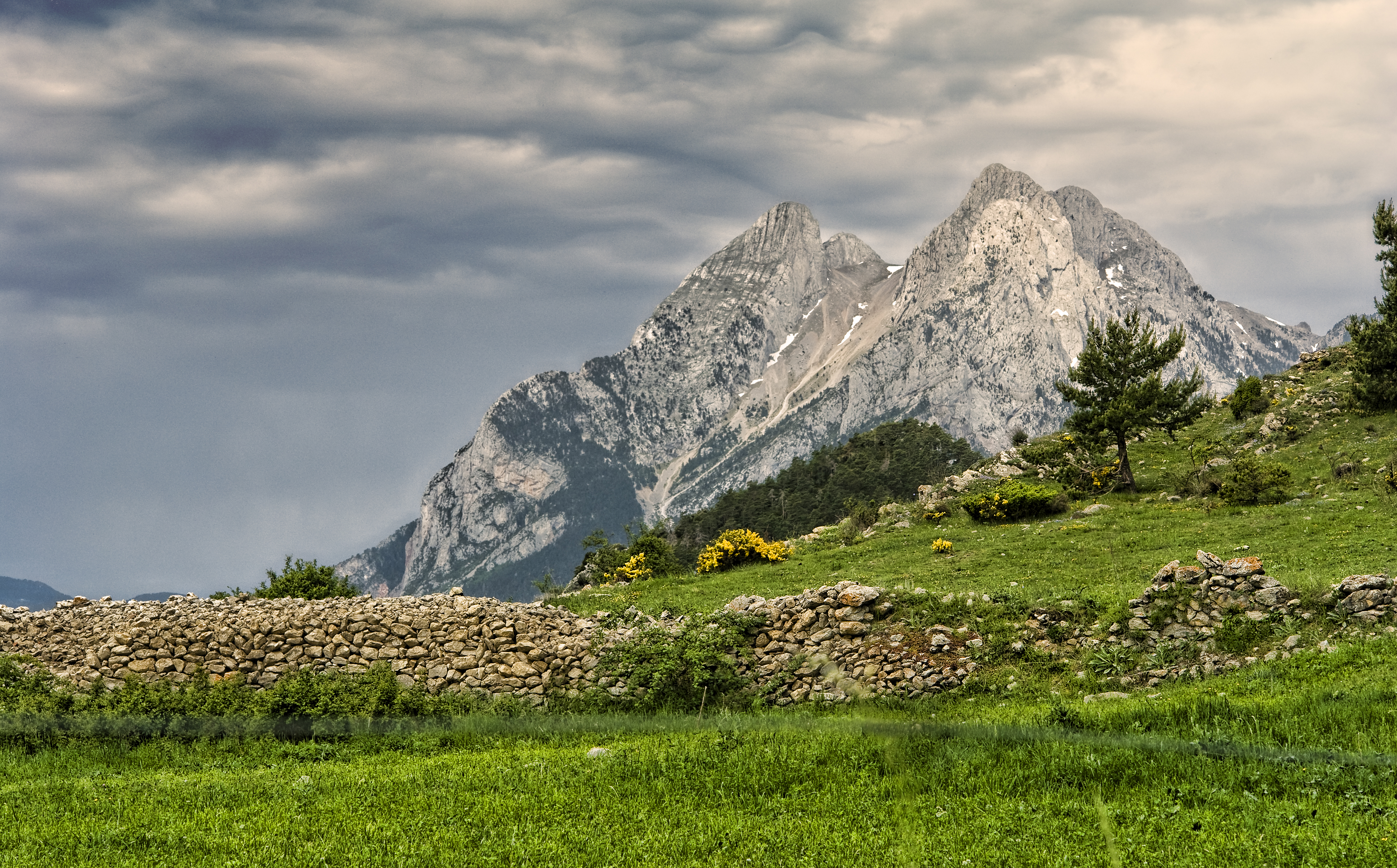
Another view of Pedraforca

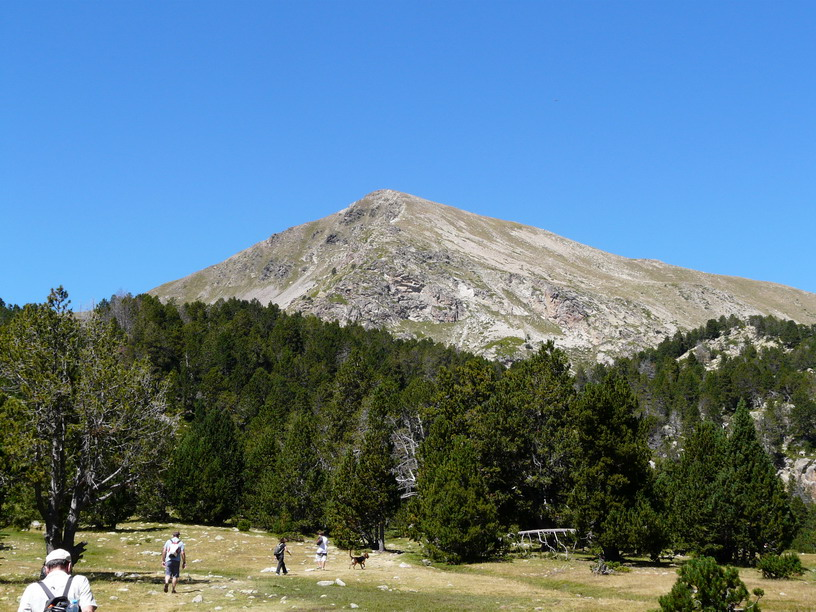
Tossal de la Truita, also known as Pic de Perafita

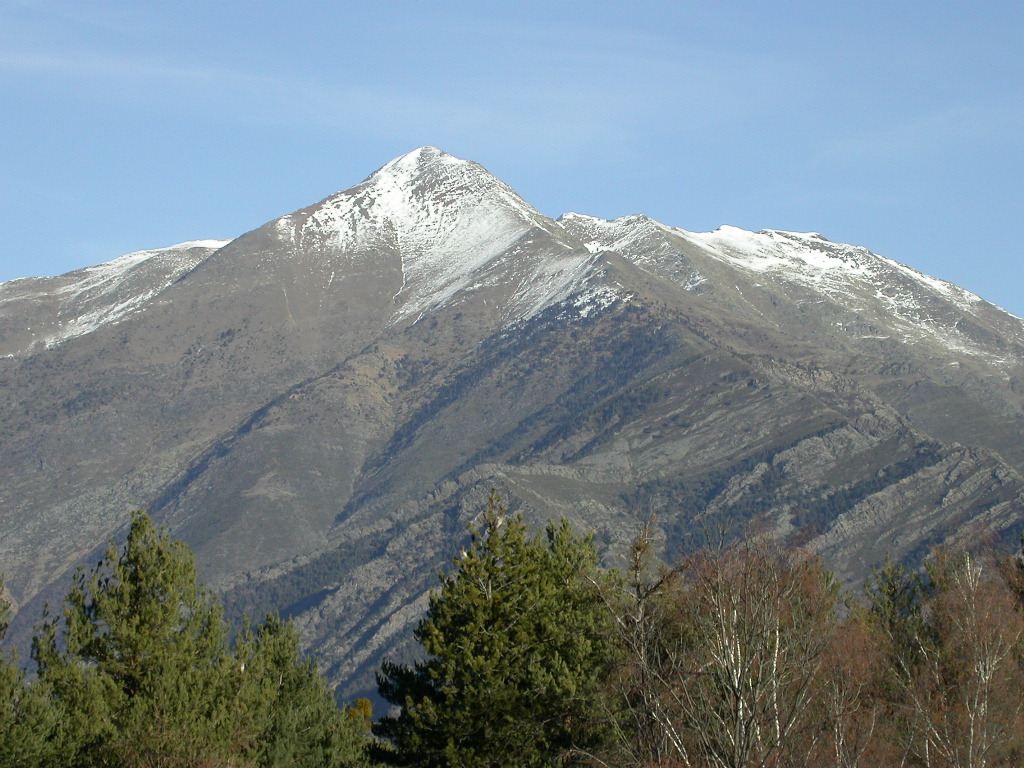
Monteixo peak

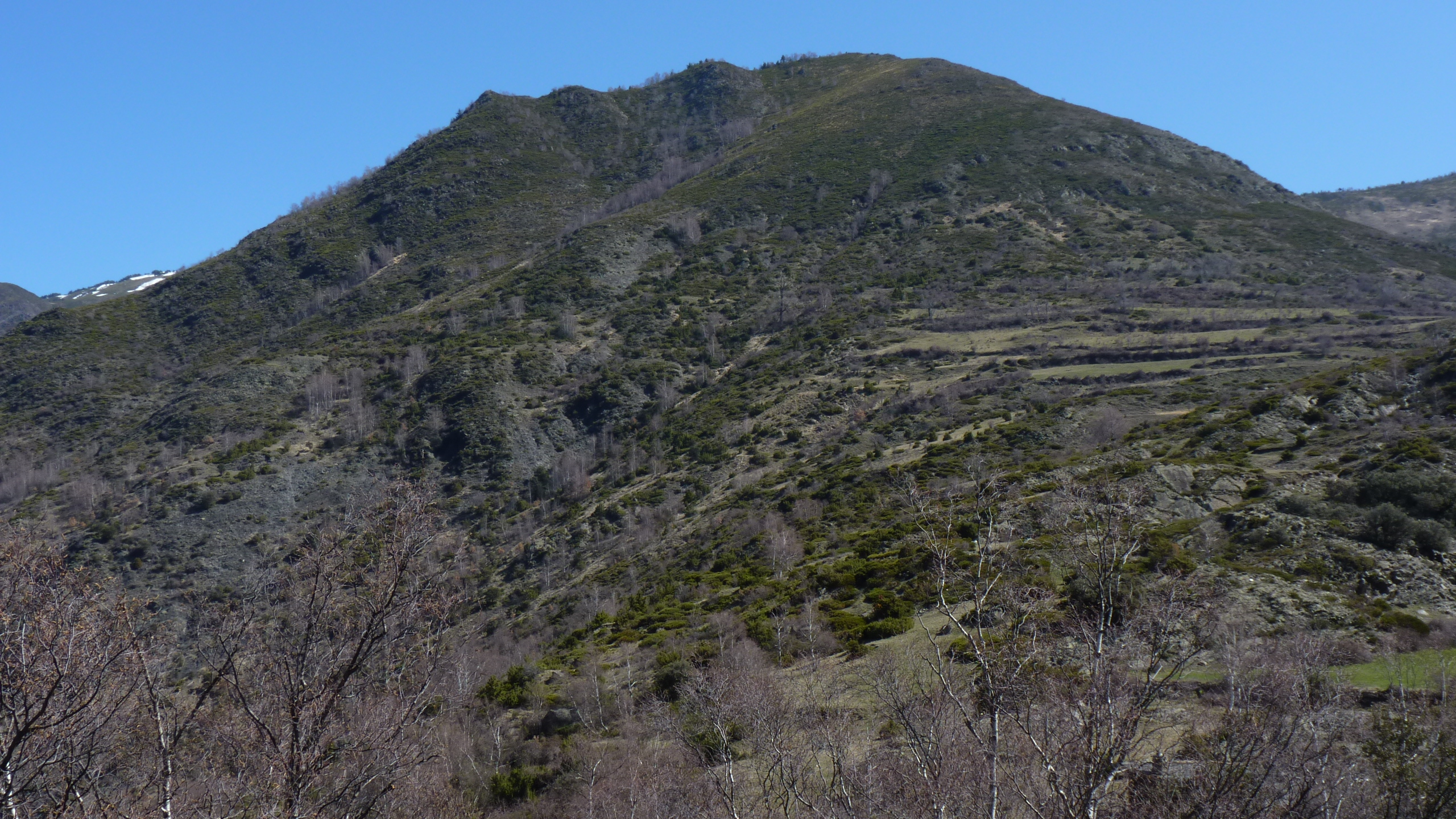
Roc Bataller, Pallars Sobirà

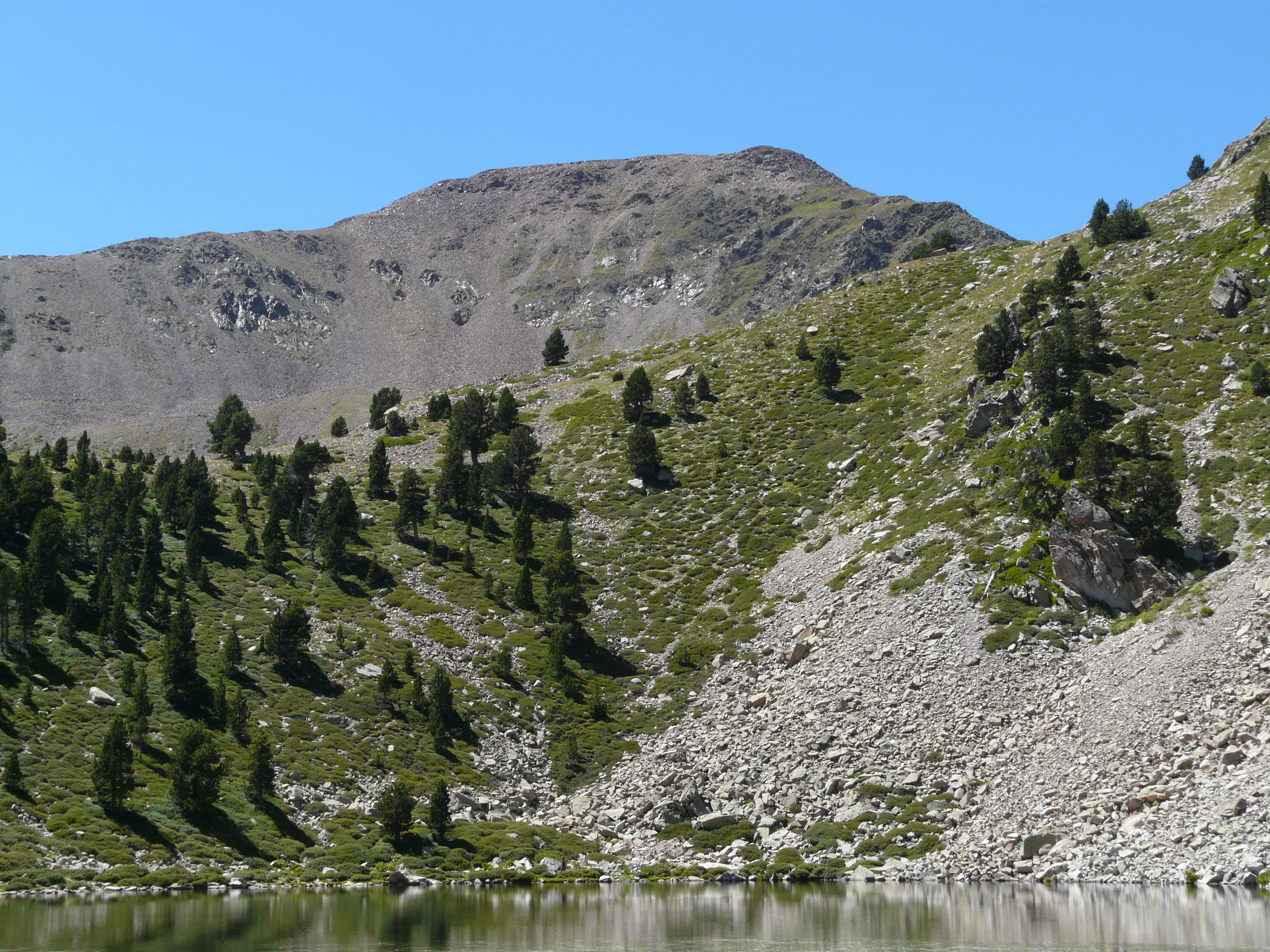
Monturull over the Estany Gran de la Pera

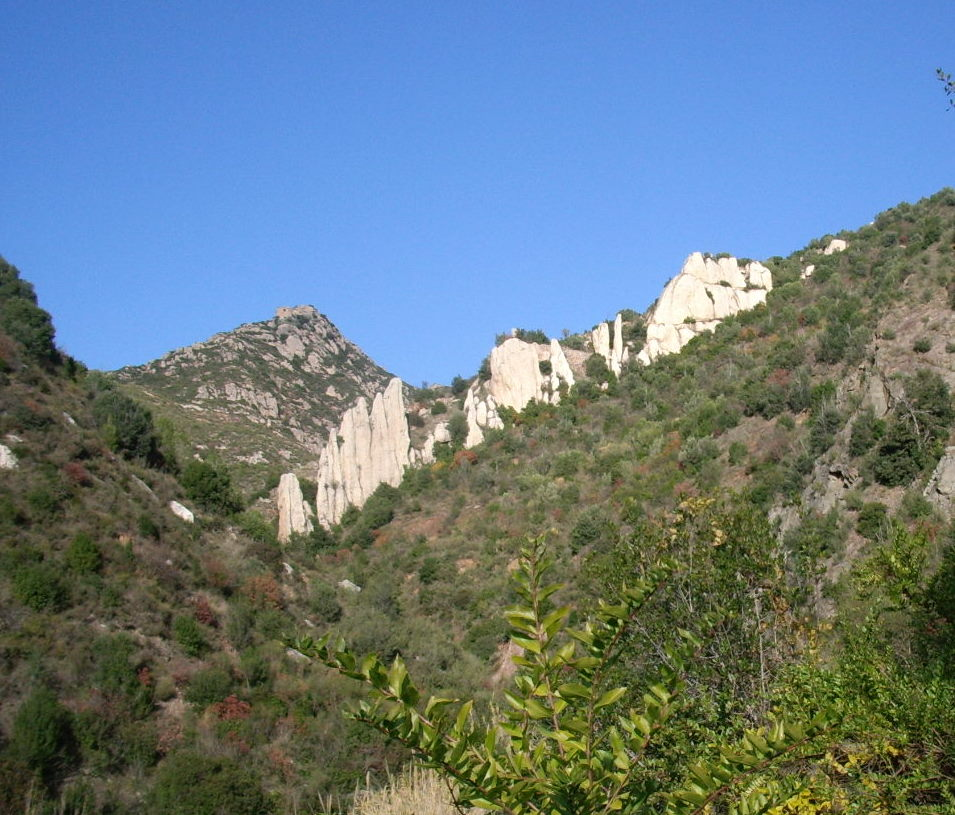
Puig de l'Hospici near Vacarisses

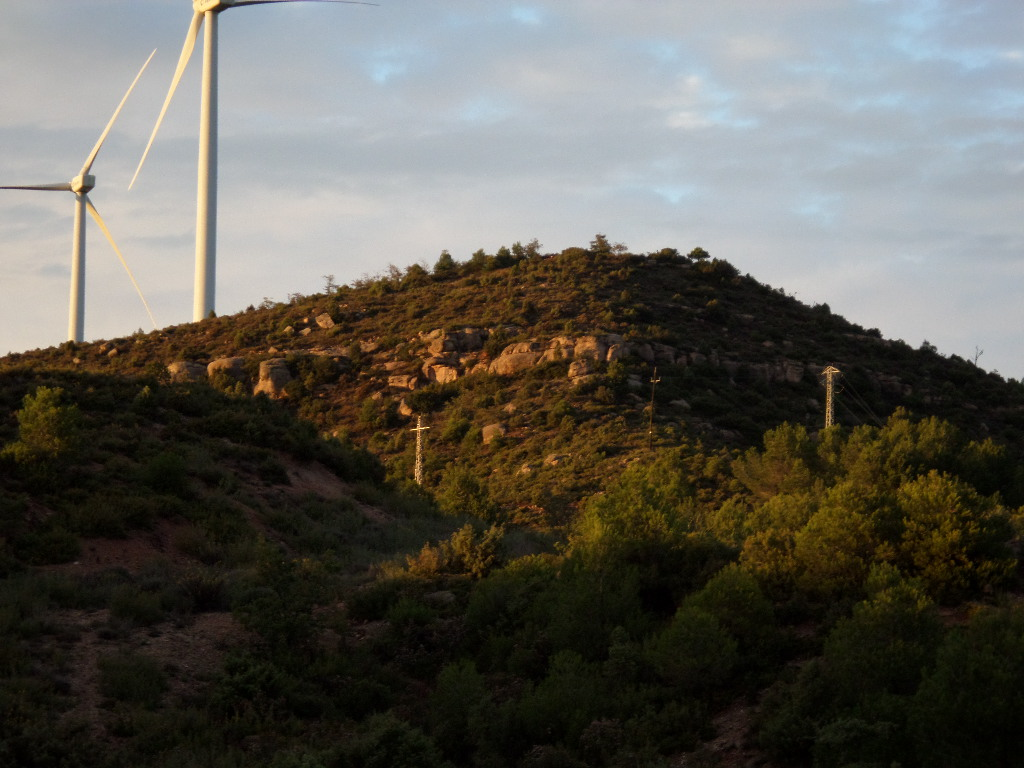
Còpia de Palomes (837m) in Central Catalonia

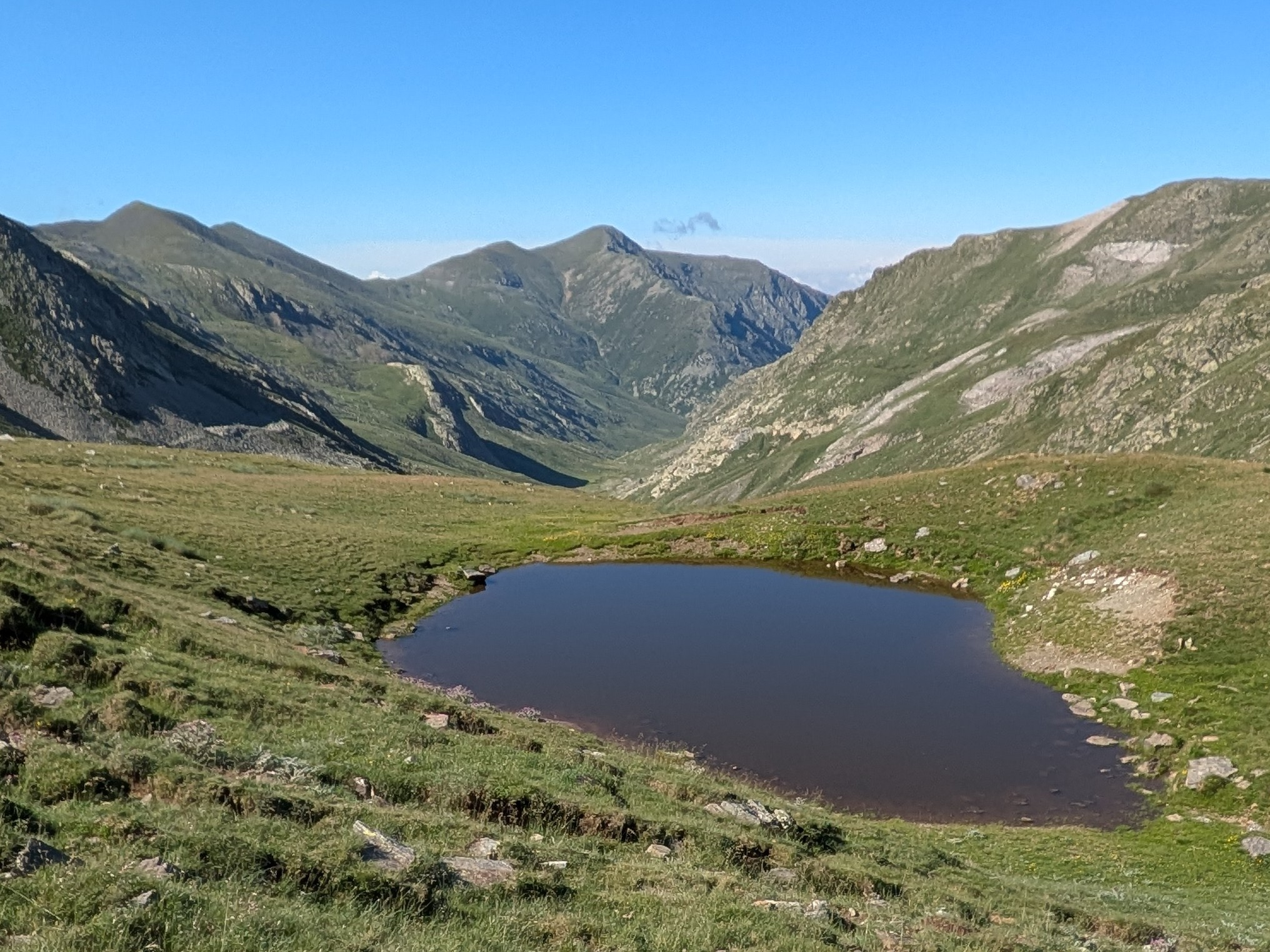
Balandrau, seen from the head of the Freser valley.

Mountains of Catalonia by height
Name	Comarca	Main range	Height
Pica d'Estats	Pallars Sobirà, Arieja	Montcalm Massif, Pyrenees	3,143.1 m
Pic Verdaguer	Pallars Sobirà, Arieja	Montcalm Massif, Pyrenees	3,129.1 m
Punta Gabarró	Pallars Sobirà, Arieja	Montcalm Massif, Pyrenees	3,105.0 m
Pic de Sotllo	Pallars Sobirà, Arieja	Montcalm Massif, Pyrenees	3,072.7 m
Comaloforno	Alta Ribagorça	Besiberri Massif (Pyrenees)	3,029.2 m
Besiberri Sud	Alta Ribagorça	Besiberri Massif (Pyrenees)	3,023.4 m
Punta Alta de Comalesbienes	Alta Ribagorça	Pyrenees	3,014.1 m
Tuc de Molières	Vall d'Aran, Ribagorça	Pyrenees	3,011.8 m
Besiberri Nord	Alta Ribagorça, La Vall d'Aran	Besiberri Massif (Pyrenees)	3,009.3 m
Rodó de Canalbona	Pallars Sobirà, Arieja	Montcalm Massif, Pyrenees	3,004 m
Besiberri del Mig	Alta Ribagorça	Besiberri Massif (Pyrenees)	2,995.2 m
Pic de la Pala Alta de Sarradé	Alta Ribagorça	Pyrenees	2,983.4 m
Pic de Peguera	Pallars Jussà Pallars Sobirà	Pyrenees	2,980.1 m
Pic de Canalbona	Pallars Sobirà, Arieja	Montcalm Massif, Pyrenees	2,965.3 m
Pic de Contraix	Alta Ribagorça	Pyrenees	2,958.0 m
Punta Senyalada	Alta Ribagorça	Besiberri Massif (Pyrenees)	2,952.6 m
Pic de Subenuix	Pallars Sobirà	Pyrenees	2,950.5 m
Coma Pedrosa	La Massana, Andorra	Pyrenees	2,942 m
Gran Tuc de Colomers	Alta Ribagorça, La Vall d'Aran	Pyrenees	2,933.5 m
Roca Entravessada	Pallars Sobirà, Andorra	Pyrenees	2,928.6 m
Tossa Plana de Lles	Baixa Cerdanya, Andorra	Pyrenees	2,903.9 m
Pic de l'Estany Fondo	Pallars Sobirà	Pyrenees	2,813.7 m
Puigpedrós	Baixa Cerdanya, Alta Cerdanya	Pyrenees	2,912.6 m
Puigmal	Ripollès, Alta Cerdanya	Pyrenees	2,909.6 m
Monteixo	Pallars Sobirà	Pyrenees	2,905 m
Pic Morto	Pallars Jussà, Pallars Sobirà	Pyrenees	2,902 m
Pic de Sanfonts	La Massana, Andorra	Pyrenees	2,894 m
Montsent de Pallars	Pallars Jussà	Pyrenees	2,883 m
Bastiments	Ripollès, Conflent	Pyrenees	2,881.3 m
Pic de l'Infern	Ripollès, Conflent	Pyrenees	2,859.0 m
la Faiada	Alta Ribagorça, Pallars Jussà	Prepirineu	2,859 m
Pic de Noufonts	Ripollès, Conflent	Pyrenees	2,851.1 m
Mont-roig	Pallars Sobirà	Pyrenees	2,846.3 m
Pic del Segre	Ripollès, Alta Cerdanya	Pyrenees	2,843.2 m
Pic de Freser	Ripollès, Conflent	Pyrenees	2,834.9 m
Pic de Finestrelles or Cim de Finestrelles	Ripollès, Alta Cerdanya	Pyrenees	2,826.9 m
Pic Petit de Segre	Ripollès, Alta Cerdanya	Pyrenees	2,810.5 m
Pic de la Fossa del Gegant	Ripollès, Conflent	Pyrenees	2,807.7 m
Pic de Noucreus	Ripollès, Conflent	Pyrenees	2,799.2 m
Pic de Salòria	Alt Urgell, Pallars Sobirà	Pyrenees	2789,3 m
Pic d'Eina	Ripollès, Alta Cerdanya	Pyrenees	2,789.2 m
Pica del Canigó	Conflent	Canigó (Pyrenees)	2,786 m
Monturull	Alt Urgell	Pyrenees	2,761 m
Tossal de la Truita or Pic de Perafita	Baixa Cerdanya; Andorra	Pyrenees	2,753.2 m
Gran Encantat	Pallars Sobirà	Pyrenees	2,748 m
La Carabassa	Cerdanya	Pyrenees	2,740 m
Coma del Clot	Ripollès	Pyrenees	2,739.0 m
Petit Encantat	Pallars Sobirà	Pyrenees	2,734 m
Tretzevents or Tres Vents	Vallespir	Canigó (Pyrenees)	2,732 m
Puig de Fontnegra	Ripollès	Pyrenees	2,727.7 m
Torreneules	Ripollès	Pyrenees	2,713.2 m
Gra de Fajol	Ripollès	Pyrenees	2,708 m
Pic de la Dona	Ripollès, Conflent	Pyrenees	2,702.5 m
les Borregues	Ripollès	Pyrenees	2,692.8 m
Puig de Pastuira	Ripollès	Pyrenees	2,353.8 m
Pic Negre d'Urgell	Andorra	Pyrenees	2,693 m
Pic de Serra Gallinera	Conflent	Pyrenees	2,663 m
Vulturó	Alt Urgell	Serra del Cadí (Prepirineu)	2,648 m
Puig d'Ombriaga	Ripollès, Conflent	Pyrenees	2,638.6 m
Pic de Costa Cabirolera	Berguedà	Serra del Cadí (Prepirineu)	2,604 m
Tosa d'Alp	Baixa Cerdanya	Pyrenees	2,587 m
Balandrau	Ripollès	Pyrenees	2,585.3 m
Puig de Fontlletera	Ripollès	Pyrenees	2,577.3 m
Gra de Fajol Petit	Ripollès	Pyrenees	2,566.9 m
Torreta de Cadí	Alt Urgell	Serra del Cadí (Prepirineu)	2,561.2 m
Tuc del Caubo	Pallars Sobirà	Pyrenees	2,557.1 m
Puig de Dòrria	Ripollès	Pyrenees	2,547.2 m
Comabona	Berguedà, Baixa Cerdanya	Serra del Cadí (Prepirineu)	2,547 m
Lo Corrunco	Alta Ribagorça	Pyrenees	2,543.3 m
Roca Colom	Ripollès, Vallespir, Conflent	Pyrenees	2,506.5 m
Pedraforca	Berguedà	Prepirineu	2,497 m
Costabona	Ripollès, Vallespir	Pyrenees	2,464 m
Puigllançada	Berguedà	Serra de Moixeró (Prepirineu)	2,409.0 m
Puig de la Collada Verda	Vallespir, Conflent	Pyrenees	2,403 m
Pedró dels Quatre Batlles	Solsonès, Alt Urgell	el Port del Comte (Prepirineu)	2,386.5 m
Cap del Verd	Alt Urgell, Solsonès	Prepirineu	2,283.8 m
Penyes Altes de Moixeró	Berguedà, Baixa Cerdanya	Serra de Moixeró (Prepirineu)	2,276.1 m
Puig Cerverís	Ripollès	Pyrenees	2,208.3 m
Roca de la Feixa	Alta Ribagorça	Pyrenees	2,092.9 m
Cap de Boumort	Pallars Jussà	Serra de Boumort (Prepirineu)	2,075.2 m
Cim de Pla de Pujalts	Ripollès	Serra de Montgrony (Prepirineu)	2,056.1 m
Taga	Ripollès	Serra de Conivella (Pyrenees)	2,038.3 m
Puig Estela	Ripollès	Serra Cavallera (Pyrenees)	2,013.1 m
Sant Amand	Ripollès	Serra de Sant Amand (Pyrenees)	1,851.4 m
Puig Cornador	Ripollès	Girona Province	1,799.7 m
Turó de l'Home	Vallès Oriental	Montseny (Catalan Pre-coastal Range)	1,706.7 m
les Agudes	Selva, Vallès Oriental	Montseny (Catalan Pre-coastal Range)	1,706 m
Matagalls	Osona, Vallès Oriental	Montseny (Catalan Pre-coastal Range)	1,697.9 m
Pui de Lleràs	Pallars Jussà	Lleida Province	1,691.9 m
Tossal de les Torretes	Noguera	Montsec de Rúbies (Prepirineu)	1,676.4 m
Sant Alís	Noguera, Pallars Jussà	Serra del Montsec	1,675.3 m
Tossal de Mirapallars i Urgell	Noguera	Lleida Province	1,672.4 m
El Coscollet	Alt Urgell	Lleida Province	1,610 m
Montfalgars	Ripollès	Girona Province	1.68,1 m
Comanegra	Garrotxa, Vallespir	Pyrenees	1,551.8 m
Puig de l'Obiol	Osona, Ripollès	Serra de Milany (Catalan Transversal Range)	1,543.6 m
Milany	Osona, Ripollès	Serra de Milany (Catalan Transversal Range)	1,533.3 m
El Cogul	Solsonès	Lleida Province	1,526 m
Puigsacalm	Garrotxa	Catalan Transversal Range	1,512.6 m
Puigsacalm Xic	Garrotxa, Osona	Catalan Transversal Range	1,490.5 m
Roc del Comptador	Alt Empordà	Serra de les Salines (Pyrenees)	1,451 m
El Moixer	Alt Empordà	Serra de les Salines (Pyrenees)	1,443 m
Mont Caro or Caro	Baix Ebre	Ports de Tortosa-Beseit (Iberian System)	1,440.6 m
Roc de Frausa	Alt Empordà	Serra de les Salines (Pyrenees)	1,421 m
Sant Mamet	Noguera	Prepirineu	1,391 m
Puig de Bassegoda	Alt Empordà, Garrotxa	Pyrenees	1,373 m
Tossal dels Tres Reis or Tossal del Rei	Montsià, Matarranya, Baix Maestrat	Ports de Beseit (Catalan Pre-coastal Range)	1,350.3 m
Sant Corneli	Pallars Jussà	Prepirineu	1,351 m
Tossal d'en Cervera	Baix Maestrat, Montsià	Ports de Beseit	1,347.5 m
Puig Drau	Vallès Oriental, Osona	Montseny (Catalan Pre-coastal Range)	1,345.5 m
el Negrell	Montsià, País Valencià	Ports de Tortosa-Beseit (Iberian System)	1,345 m
Puig de l'Àliga	Osona	Serra de Curull (Catalan Transversal Range)	1,344.2 m
el Sui	Vallès Oriental	Montseny(Catalan Pre-coastal Range)	1,322 m
Cabrera	Garrotxa, Osona	Collsacabra (Catalan Transversal Range)	1,307.7 m
Turó de Morou	Vallès Oriental, Selva	Montseny (Catalan Pre-coastal Range)	1,303.6 m
Turó del Samont	Vallès Oriental	Montseny (Catalan Pre-coastal Range)	1,272 m
Puig Neulós	Alt Empordà, Rosselló	Serra de l'Albera	1,256 m
Bellmunt	Osona	Serra de Bellmunt (Catalan Transversal Range)	1,246.9 m
Sant Jeroni	Anoia, Bages, Baix Llobregat	Montserrat (Catalan Pre-coastal Range)	1,236.4 m
Puig Cornador	Ripollès	Girona Province	1,229.2 m
Tosseta Rasa	Terra Alta	Ports de Tortosa-Beseit	1,219 m
Punta de la Torroja	Montsià, Aragó	Ports de Beseit (Catalan Pre-coastal Range)	1,204.8 m
Tossal de la Baltasana	Baix Camp, Conca de Barberà	Muntanyes de Prades (Catalan Pre-coastal Range)	1,203 m
Sant Miquel de Solterra	Selva	Guilleries (Catalan Pre-coastal Range)	1,203 m
Rocallarga	Osona	Catalan Transversal Range	1,186.5 m
L'Espina	Terra Alta, Baix Ebre	Serra de l'Espina (Iberian System/Catalan Pre-coastal Range)	1,181 m
Puntal de l'Albarda or L'Albarda Castellana	Baix Llobregat	Montserrat	1,177 m
Roca Corbatera	Priorat	Montsant (Catalan Pre-coastal Range)	1,163 m
Sant Benet	La Selva	Girona Province	1,150 m
Mola d'Estat	Baix Camp, Conca de Barberà	Muntanyes de Prades	1,127.3 m
Mare de Déu del Mont	Alt Empordà	Prepirineu	1,123.1 m
Mola del Guerxet	Conca de Barberà	Isolated hill; Catalan Central Depression	1,121.2 m
Mola dels Quatre Termes	Baix Camp, Conca de Barberà	Muntanyes de Prades	1,117.7 m
el Far	Selva	Collsacabra (Catalan Transversal Range)	1,110.3 m
Piló dels Senyalets	Priorat	Isolated hill; Catalan Central Depression	1,107 m
La Mola	Vallès Occidental	Sant Llorenç del Munt (Catalan Pre-coastal Range)	1,104 m
Punta de l'Aigua	Baix Ebre, Terra Alta	Isolated hill; Catalan Central Depression	1,091.6 m
El Montmajor	Garrotxa	Catalan Transversal Range	1,073.8 m
Tossal d'Engrilló	Terra Alta	Isolated hill; Catalan Central Depression	1,072 m
Els Munts	Osona		1,057.1 m
Montcau	Vallès Occidental, Bages	Sant Llorenç del Munt (Catalan Pre-coastal Range)	1,056.7 m
Tagamanent	Vallès Oriental	Montseny (Catalan Pre-coastal Range)	1,055.9 m
la Mussara	Baix Camp	Muntanyes de Prades (Catalan Pre-coastal Range)	1,055.6 m
Turó de Bellver	Osona	(Catalan Transversal Range)	1,041.5 m
Puigsallança	Garrotxa	Serra de Finestres (Catalan Transversal Range)	1,026.2 m
Puig Castellar	Osona	(Catalan Transversal Range)	1,017 m
Punta de la Barrina	Alt Camp	Muntanyes de Prades (Catalan Pre-coastal Range)	1,013.6 m
Roca Centella	Vallès Oriental	Montseny (Catalan Pre-coastal Range)	1,000.5 m
Punta del Curull	Garrigues	Serra de la Llena	1,021.9 m
Turó de Sant Elies	Vallès Oriental	Montseny (Catalan Pre-coastal Range)	1,003 m
Puigsou	Gironès	Muntanya de Rocacorba	991.3 m
Picorandan	Baix Camp	Catalan Pre-coastal Range	991.2 m
Montagut d'Ancosa	Alt Camp	(Catalan Pre-coastal Range)	963.1 m
Castell de l'Airosa	Baix Ebre	Ports de Tortosa-Beseit	953.8 m
Creu de Santos	Baix Ebre, Ribera d'Ebre	Serra de Cardó	941.9 m
Mola de Llaberia	Ribera d'Ebre, Baix Camp	Serra de Llaberia (Catalan Pre-Coastal Range)	918.3 m
La Miranda	Ribera d'Ebre, Baix Camp	Serra de Llaberia (Catalan Pre-Coastal Range)	918 m
Mola de Colldejou	Baix Camp	Tivissa-Vandellós Mountains (Catalan Pre-Coastal Range)	908.5 m
La Tossa	Pallars Jussà	Pyrenees	887 m
Puig Sesarques	Gironès, Pla de l'Estany		880.3 m
Tossal Gros	Alt Camp, Conca de Barberà	(Catalan Pre-coastal Range)	866.6 m
Puig Cornador	Osona		859.7 m
Turó del Galutxo	Segarra		851.5 m
Turó de la Creu de Gurb	Osona		841.6 m
Còpia de Palomes	Anoia	Serra de Rubió	837.5 m
Les Tres alzines	Anoia	Serra de Rubió	831.2 m
La Moleta d'Alfara	Baix Ebre	(Serra de l'Espina)	812 m
Puig-l'agulla or Creu de Montagut	Osona		810.3 m
Roc de la Guàrdia	Osona	(Catalan Transversal Range)	809 m
Turó de la Mamella	Vallès Occidental	Serra de l'Obac (Catalan Pre-Coastal Range)	806.6 m
Tossal Gros de Vallbona	Urgell	Serra del Tallat	802.9 m
Puig de la Talaia	Baix Penedès	Serra del Montmell	801.4 m
La Cogulla	Alt Camp, Conca de Barberà	(Catalan Pre-coastal Range)	785.6 m
Tossa de Viamar	Baix Ebre	Serra de Cardó (Catalan Pre-coastal Range)	766.9 m
Turó Gros	Vallès Oriental	Massís del Montnegre (Catalan Coastal Range)	766.1 m
Buinaca	Baix Ebre	Serra del Boix (Catalan Pre-Coastal Range)	764.6 m
La Torreta del Montsià	Montsià	Serra del Montsià (Catalan Pre-Coastal Range)	764 m
Morral de Cabrafeixet	Baix Ebre	Cardó Massif (Catalan Pre-Coastal Range)	753 m
L'Avellanet	Anoia	Serra of Rubió	751.9 m
Muntanya de Santa Bàrbara	Terra Alta	Ports de Tortosa-Beseit	751 m
Montalt	Ribera d'Ebre	Serra de Montalt	749 m
Puig de les Torres	Alt Penedès	Catalan Pre-coastal Range	748 m
Molacima	Montsià	Serra del Montsià	748 m
Puig de Sant Miquel	Anoia	Serra of Rubió	733 m
Molló Puntaire	Baix Camp	Los Dedalts (Catalan Coastal Range)	728 m
Punta del Pollo	Baix Ebre	Catalan Pre-coastal Range	693.9 m
Puig Cornador	Osona		682.7 m
Montau	Alt Penedès, Baix Llobregat	Massís del Garraf (Catalan Coastal Range)	657.1 m
La Foradada	Montsià	Serra del Montsià (Catalan Coastal Range)	655 m
Puig Cornador	Osona		621.4 m
Puig de la Cabrafiga	Baix Camp	Catalan Pre-Coastal Range	614 m
La Morella	Baix Llobregat	Massís del Garraf (Catalan Coastal Range)	593.6 m
Sant Roc d'Amer	Garrotxa, Gironès, Selva	Catalan Transversal Range	591 m
Punta de l'Home	Terra Alta	Serra de la Fatarella (Catalan Central Depression)	552 m
Puig d'Arques	Baix Empordà	les Gavarres (Catalan Coastal Range)	532.2 m
Puig de la Mola	Alt Penedès, Baix Llobregat, Garraf	Massís del Garraf (Catalan Coastal Range)	533.8 m
Turó de Céllecs	Maresme, Vallès Oriental	Serra del Corredor (Catalan Coastal Range)	534 m
Puig de les Cadiretes	Gironès, Selva	Massís de les Cadiretes (Catalan Coastal Range)	518 m
Puig de l'Hospici	Baix Llobregat, Vallès Occidental	Serra de l'Hospici (Catalan Coastal Range)	517.9 m
Tibidabo	Barcelonès	Serra de Collserola (Catalan Coastal Range)	512 m
Puntal dels Escambrons	Segrià, Ribera d'Ebre	Pla de Lleida	500.0 m
La Picossa	Ribera d'Ebre		495.8 m
Montmeneu	Segrià	Pla de Lleida	493.9 m
Puig Cornador	Garrotxa	Girona Province	450.7 m
Puig d'Olorda	Baix Llobregat	Serra de Collserola (Catalan Coastal Range)	436 m
Puig de les Cols	Baix Empordà	Massís del Montgrí (Catalan Coastal Range)	415.7 m
Montclar	Baix Empordà	(Catalan Coastal Range)	401.1 m
Puig d'Ossa	Baix Llobregat	Serra de Collserola (Catalan Coastal Range)	399 m
Puig de Sant Baldiri	Baix Empordà	(Catalan Coastal Range)	398.0 m
Tossa Grossa de Montferri	Alt Camp	(Catalan Pre-coastal Range)	387.3 m
Penya del Moro	Baix Llobregat	Serra de Collserola (Catalan Coastal Range)	375 m
Montgròs	Garraf	Massís del Garraf (Catalan Coastal Range)	359.2 m
La Mola	Tarragonès, Baix Penedès	Catalan Pre-coastal Range	316.6 m
Puig d'en Boronet	Garraf	Massís del Garraf (Catalan Coastal Range)	315 m
Montplà	Baix Empordà	Massís del Montgrí (Catalan Coastal Range)	310.3 m
Muntanya d'Ullà	Baix Empordà	Massís del Montgrí (Catalan Coastal Range)	306.2 m
Montgrí	Baix Empordà	Massís del Montgrí (Catalan Coastal Range)	303.0 m
Tossal de l'Infern	Pla d'Urgell	Tossals de Torregrossa	301.4 m
La Fita Alta	Pla d'Urgell	Classif. unclear	289.2 m
Fita dels Tres Termes	Alt Penedès, Garraf	Massís del Garraf (Catalan Coastal Range)	276.5 m
La Talaia	Alt Penedès, Garraf	Massís del Garraf (Catalan Coastal Range)	269.1 m
La Cogulla	Priorat	Isolated hill; Catalan Central Depression	244.3 m
Turó de la Dona Morta	Selva	Hill of the Catalan Coastal Depression	190.0 m
Punta dels Guíxols	Baix Empordà	(Catalan Coastal Range)	37 m

== See also ==
- Montserrat
- List of mountains in Aragon
