= Tosseta Rasa =

Mountain in Catalonia, Spain

Coordinates: 40°50′42″N 0°19′39″E

Highest point
- Elevation: 1,219 m (3,999 ft)

Geography
- Location: Catalonia, Spain

Tosseta Rasa is a mountain of Catalonia, Spain. It has an elevation of 1,219 metres above sea level.

== See also ==
- Mountains of Catalonia
