= Punta de la Torroja =

Coordinates: 40°45′04″N 0°09′31″E

Highest point
- Elevation: 1,204 m (3,950 ft)

Geography
- Location: Catalonia, Spain

Punta de la Torroja is a mountain of Catalonia, Spain. It has an elevation of 1,204 metres above sea level.

== See also ==
- Mountains of Catalonia
