= La Faiada =

Mountain in Catalonia, Spain

Highest point
- Coordinates: 42.376°N 0.780°E

Geography
- Location: Catalonia, Spain
- Parent range: Pyrenees

La Faiada is a mountain of Catalonia, Spain. Located in the Pyrenees, it has an altitude of 2,859 metres (9,380 ft) above sea level.

== See also ==
- List of mountains in Catalonia
