= Pic de la Fossa del Gegant =

Mountain in Catalonia, Spain

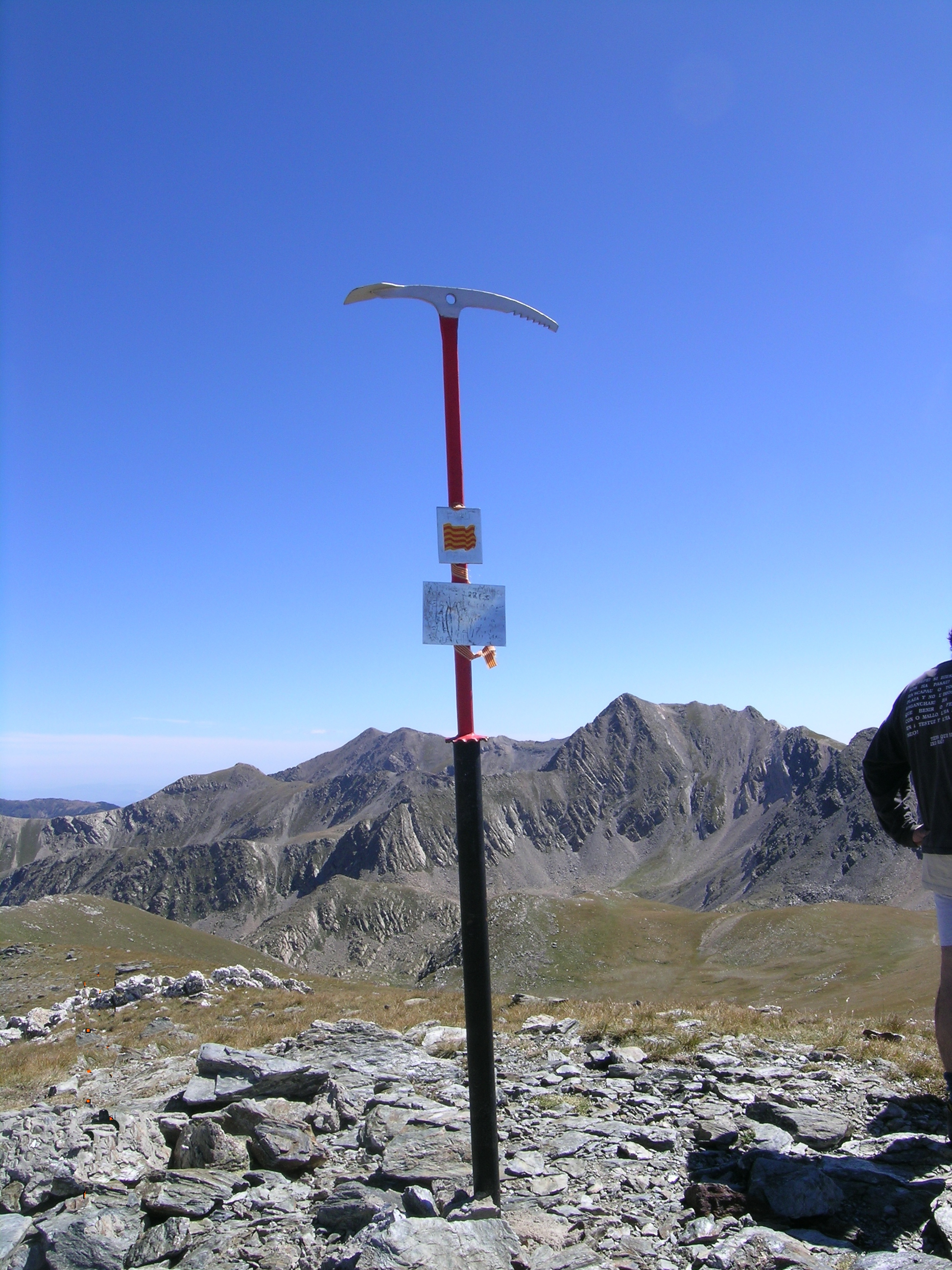
- Pic de la Fossa del Gegant Summit

Highest point
- Elevation: 2,807 m (9,209 ft)
- Coordinates: 42°25′02″N 2°11′26″E

Geography
- Location: Catalonia, Spain
- Parent range: Pyrenees

Pic de la Fossa del Gegant is a mountain in Catalonia, Spain. Located in the Pyrenees, it has an altitude of 2,807 metres (9,209 ft) above sea level.

== See also ==
- Mountains of Catalonia
