= Pic de Contraix =

Coordinates: 42°35′07″N 0°54′25″E

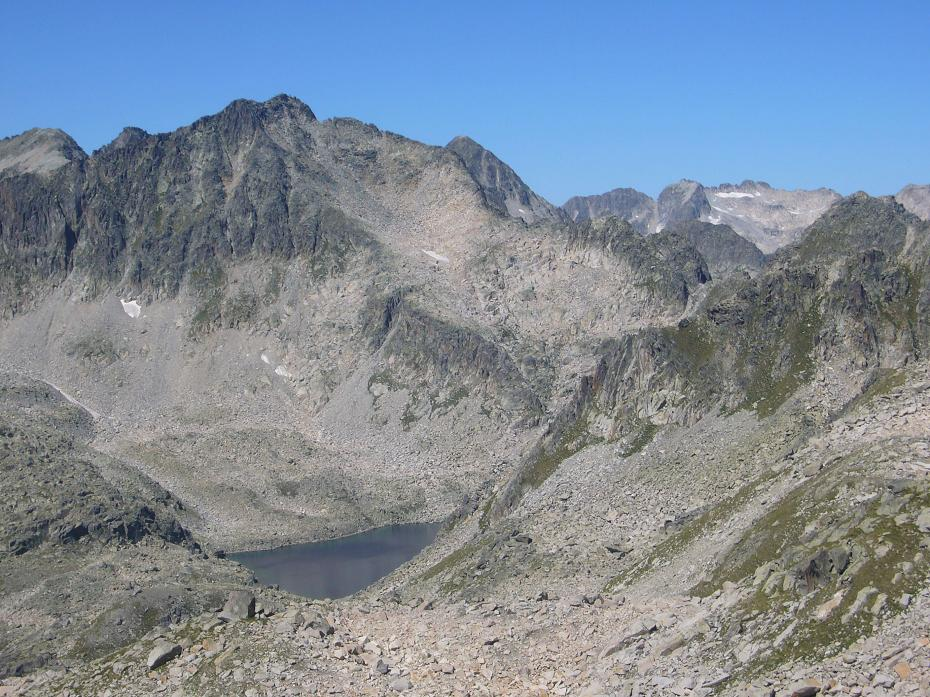

Highest point
- Elevation: 2,958 m (9,705 ft)

Geography
- Location: Catalonia, Spain
- Parent range: Pyrenees

Pic de Contraix is a mountain of Catalonia, Spain. Located in the Pyrenees, it has an altitude of 2,958 metres (9,705 ft) above sea level.

== See also ==
- Mountains of Catalonia
