= Turó de Bellver =

Coordinates: 41°50′50″N 2°10′17″E

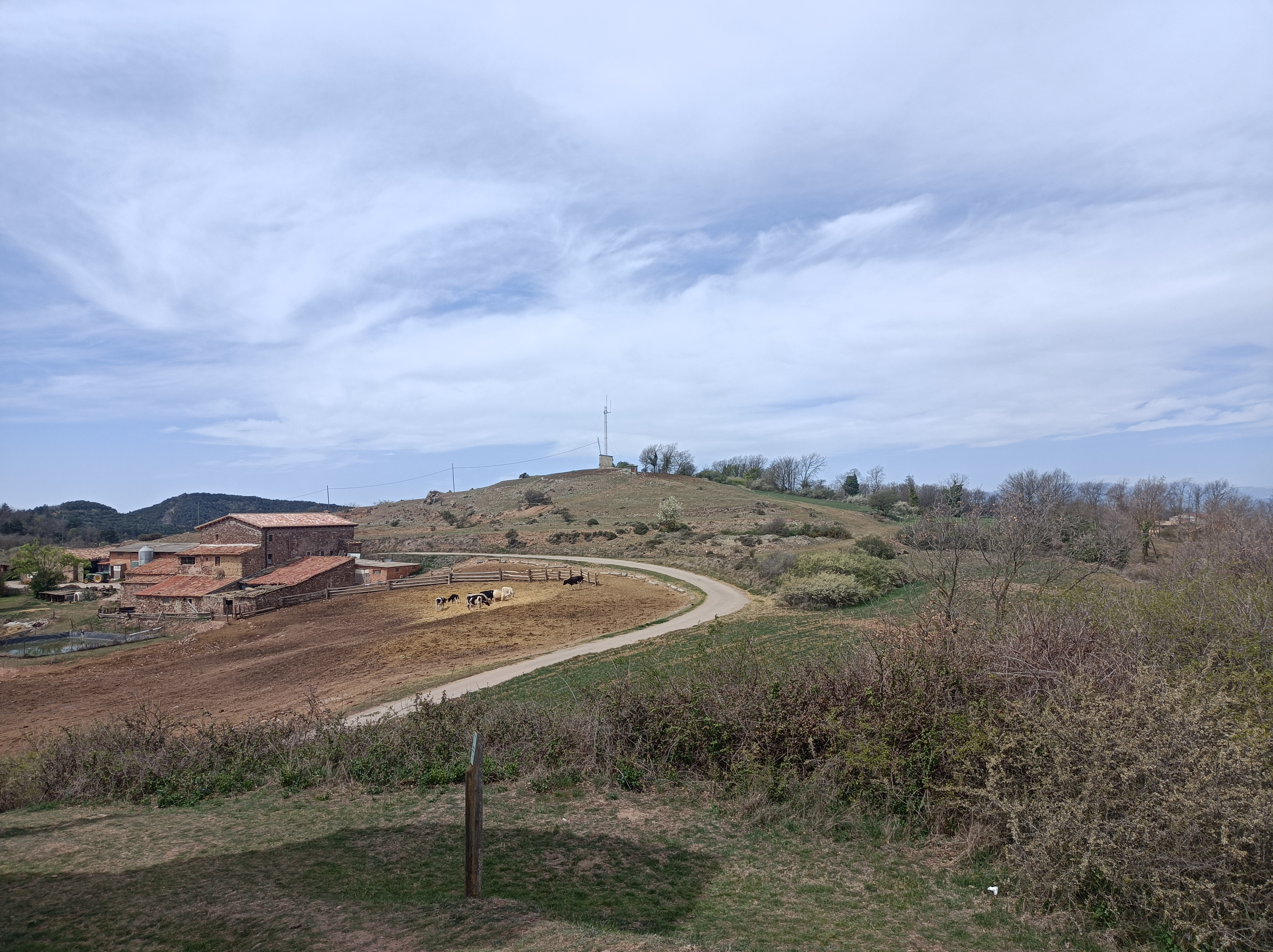

Highest point
- Elevation: 1,041 m (3,415 ft)

Geography
- Location: Catalonia, Spain

Turó de Bellver is a mountain of Catalonia, Spain. It has an elevation of 1,041 metres above sea level.

== See also ==
- Mountains of Catalonia
