= Pic de Peguera =

Coordinates: 42°32′26″N 1°00′43″E

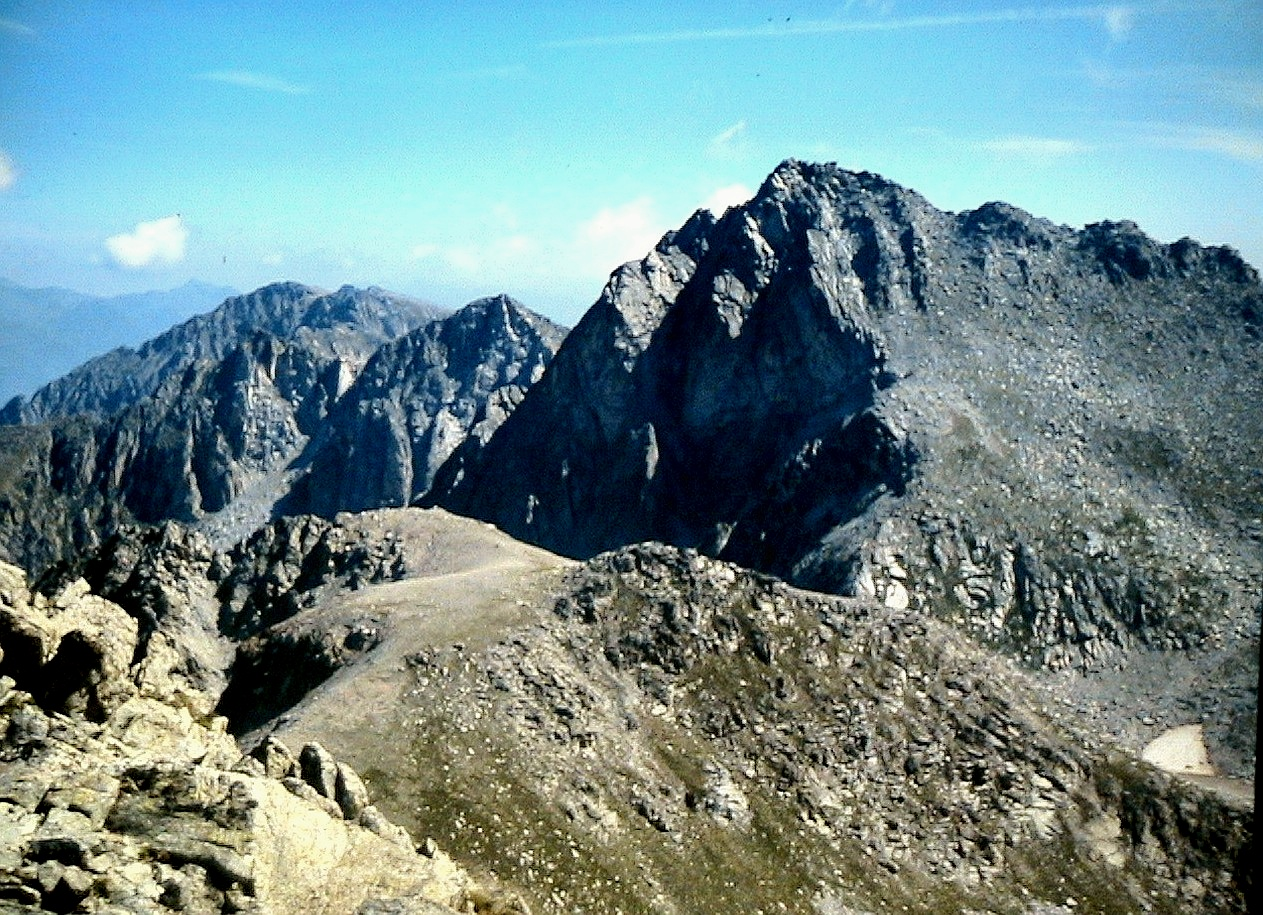
- View from Pic de Mar

Highest point
- Elevation: 2,980 m (9,780 ft)
- Listing: Mountains in Catalonia

Geography
- Location within Spain
- Location: Catalonia, Spain
- Parent range: Pyrenees

Pic de Peguera is a mountain of Catalonia, Spain. Located in the Pyrenees, it has an elevation of 2,980 metres above sea level.
