= Turó de Morou =

Mountain in Spain

Coordinates: 41°46′22″N 2°28′51″E

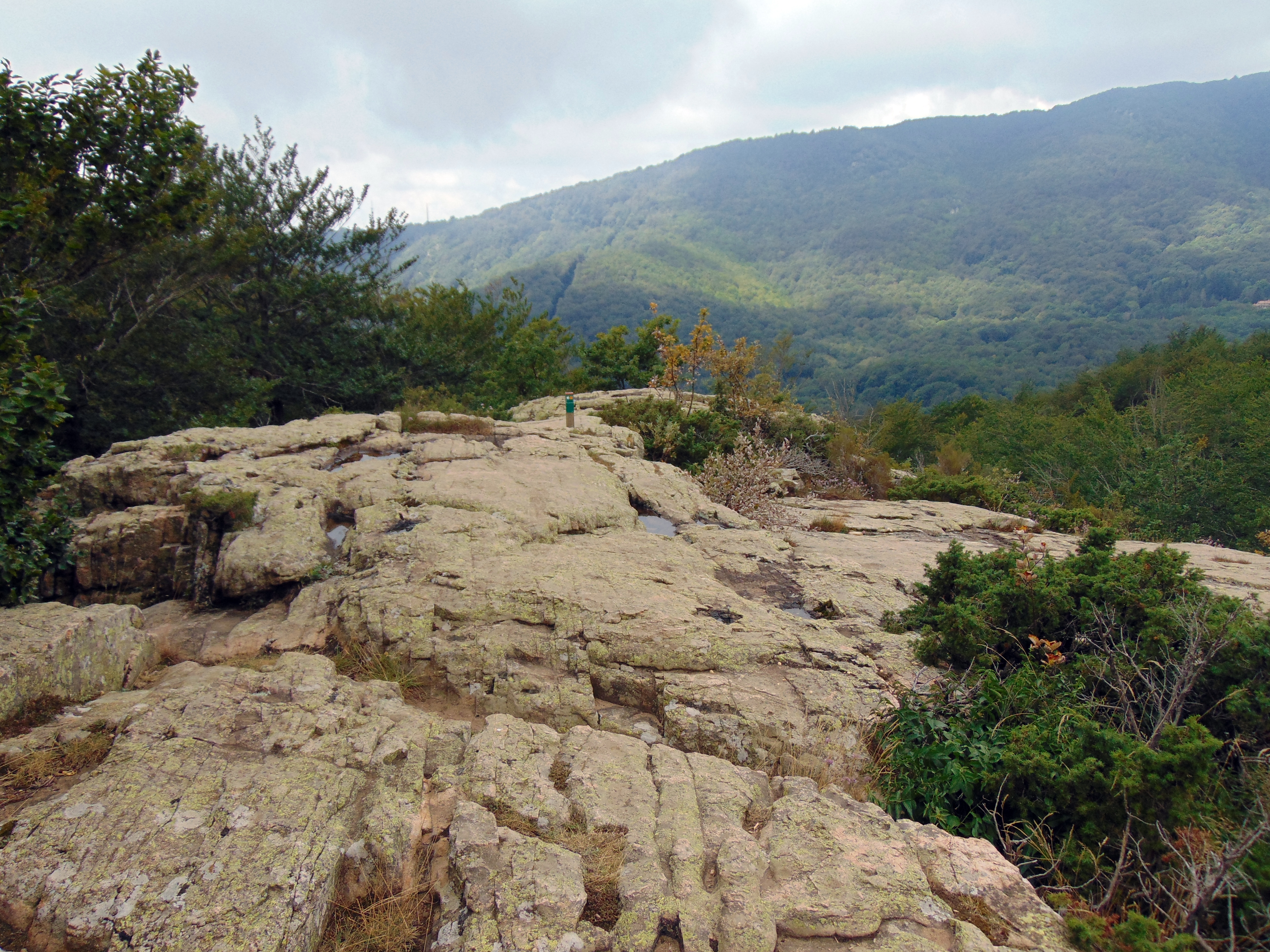

Highest point
- Elevation: 1,303 m (4,275 ft)

Geography
- Location: Catalonia, Spain

Turó de Morou is a mountain of Catalonia, Spain. It has an elevation of 1,303 metres above sea level.

== See also ==
- Mountains of Catalonia
