= El Montmajor =

Mountain in Catalonia, Spain

Coordinates: 42°16′08″N 2°28′59″E

Highest point
- Elevation: 1,073 m (3,520 ft)

Geography
- Location: Catalonia, Spain

El Montmajor is a mountain of Catalonia, Spain. It has an elevation of 1,073 metres above sea level.

== See also ==
- Mountains of Catalonia
