= Puigsacalm Xic =

Coordinates: 42°07′27″N 2°23′09″E

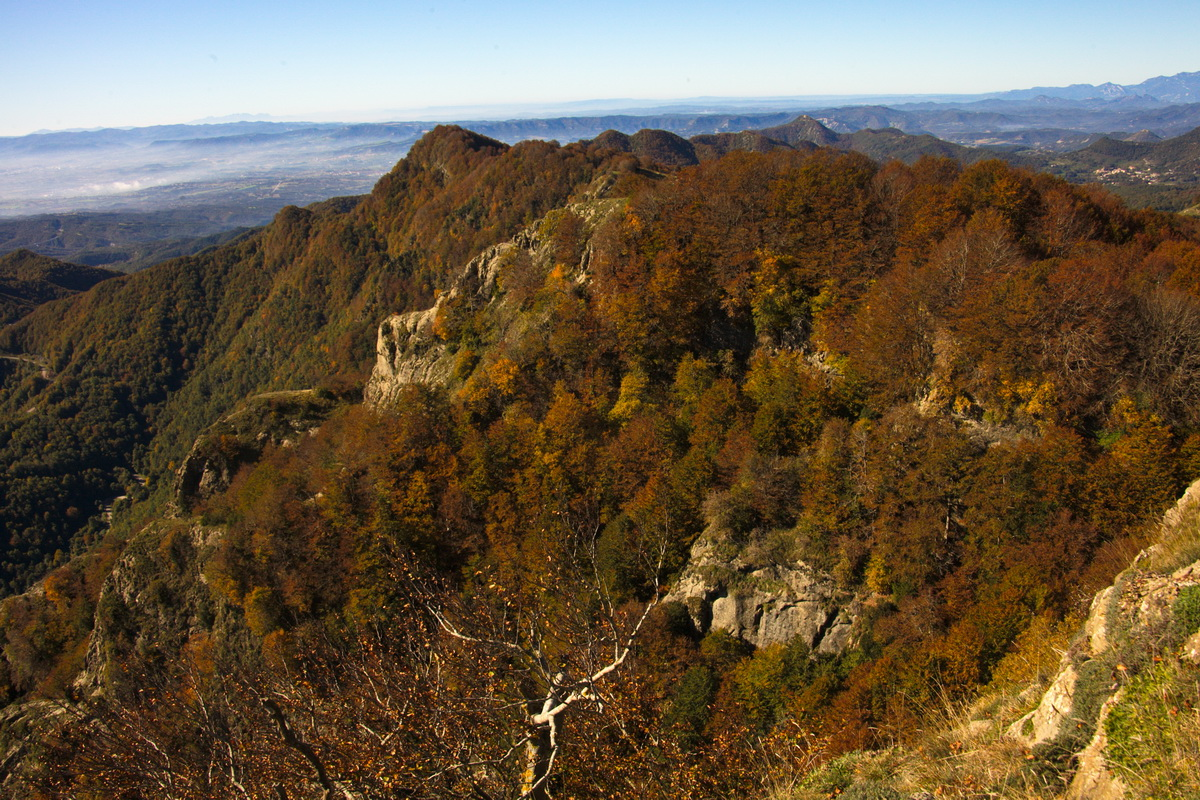

Highest point
- Elevation: 1,490 m (4,890 ft)

Geography
- Location: Catalonia, Spain

Puigsacalm Xic is a mountain of Catalonia, Spain. It has an elevation of 1,490 metres above sea level.

== See also ==
- Mountains of Catalonia
