= Turó del Galutxo =

Mountain in Catalonia, Spain

Coordinates: 41°33′18″N 1°22′51″E

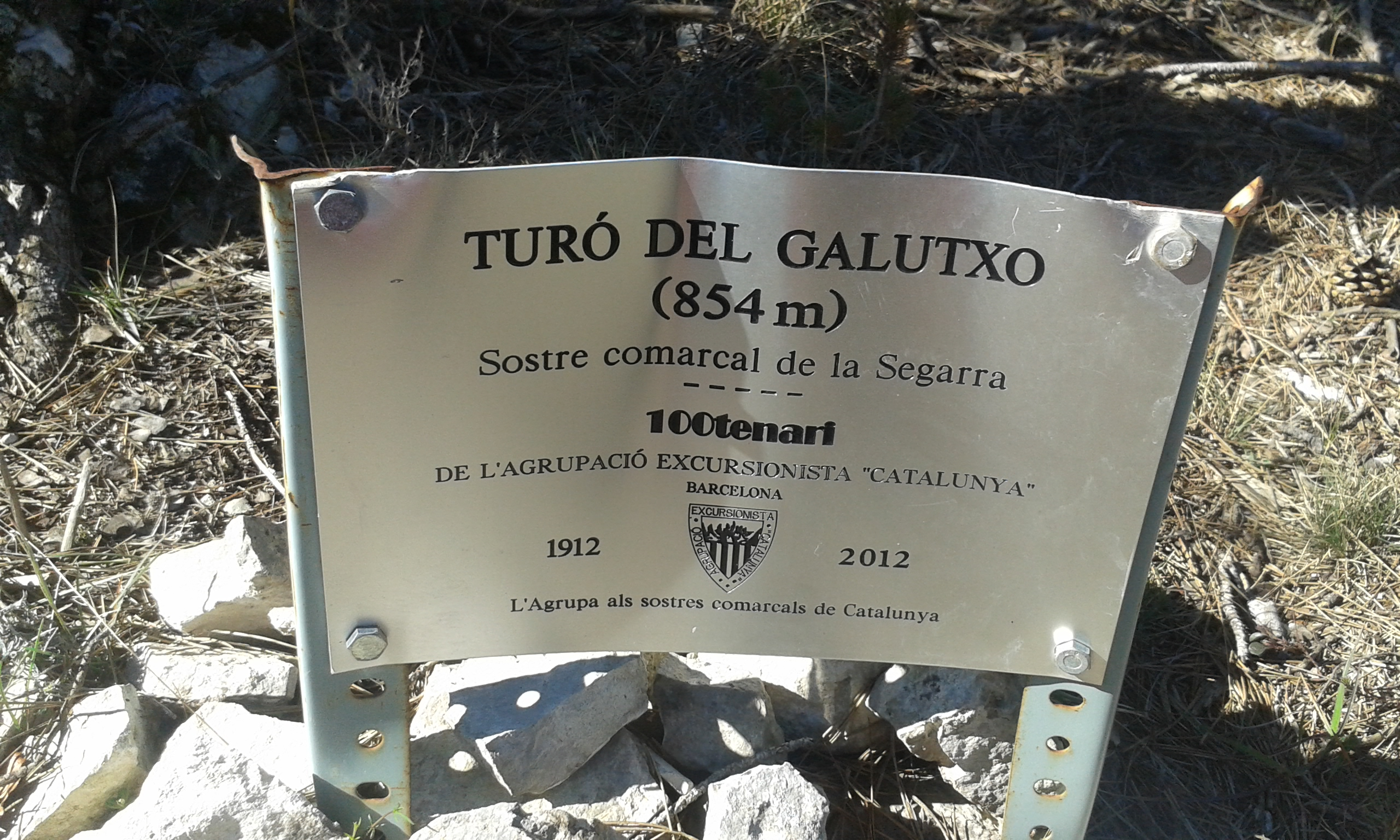

Highest point
- Elevation: 851 m (2,792 ft)

Geography
- Location: Catalonia, Spain

Turó del Galutxo is a mountain of Catalonia, Spain. It has an elevation of 851 metres above sea level.

== See also ==
- Mountains of Catalonia
