= El Sui =

Spanish mountain

Coordinates: 41°44′57″N 2°20′44″E

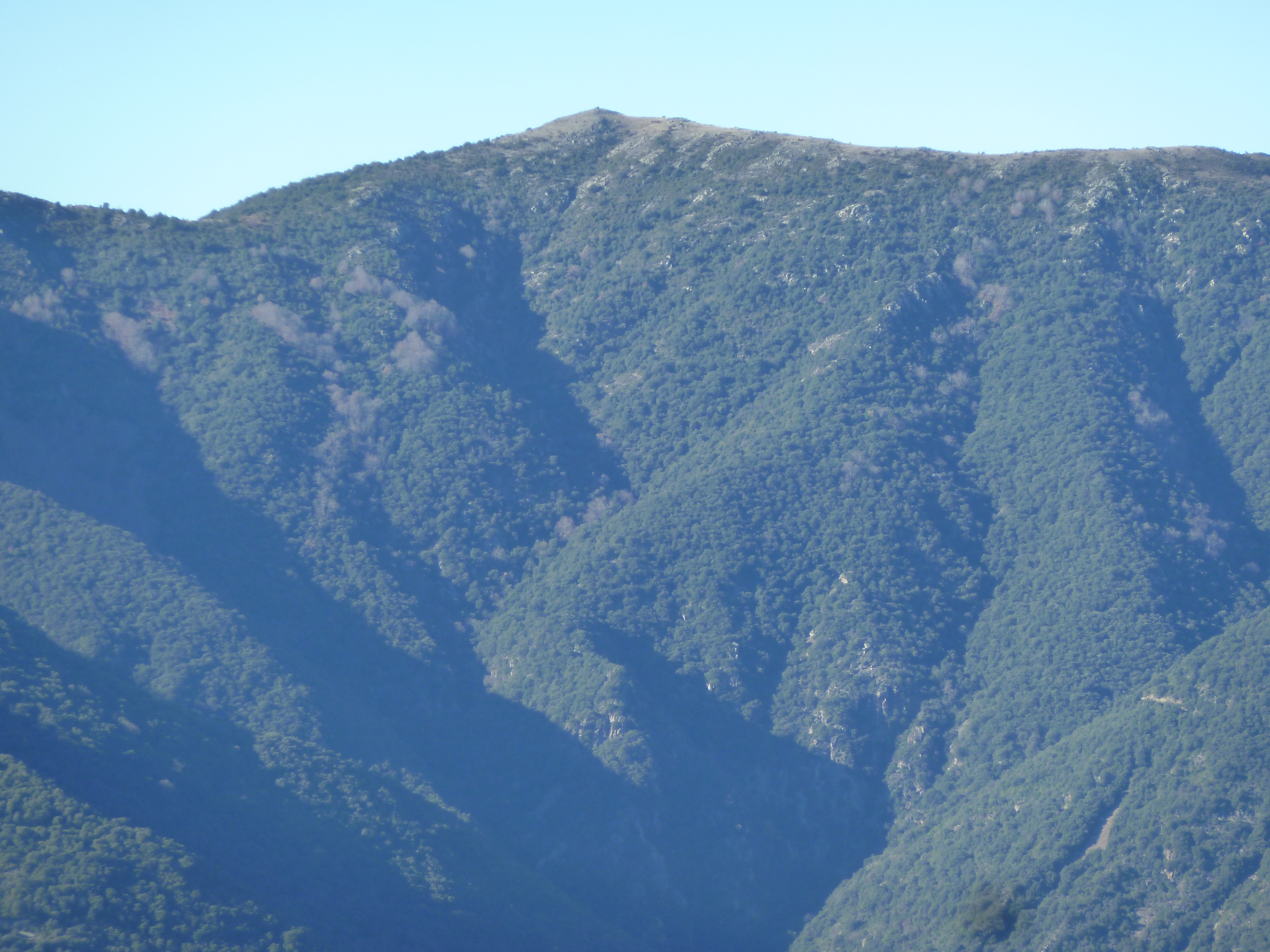

Highest point
- Elevation: 1,322 m (4,337 ft)

Geography
- Location: Catalonia, Spain

El Sui is a mountain of Catalonia, Spain. It has an elevation of 1,322 metres above sea level.

== See also ==
- Mountains of Catalonia
