= Gran Tuc de Colomers =

Mountain in Spain

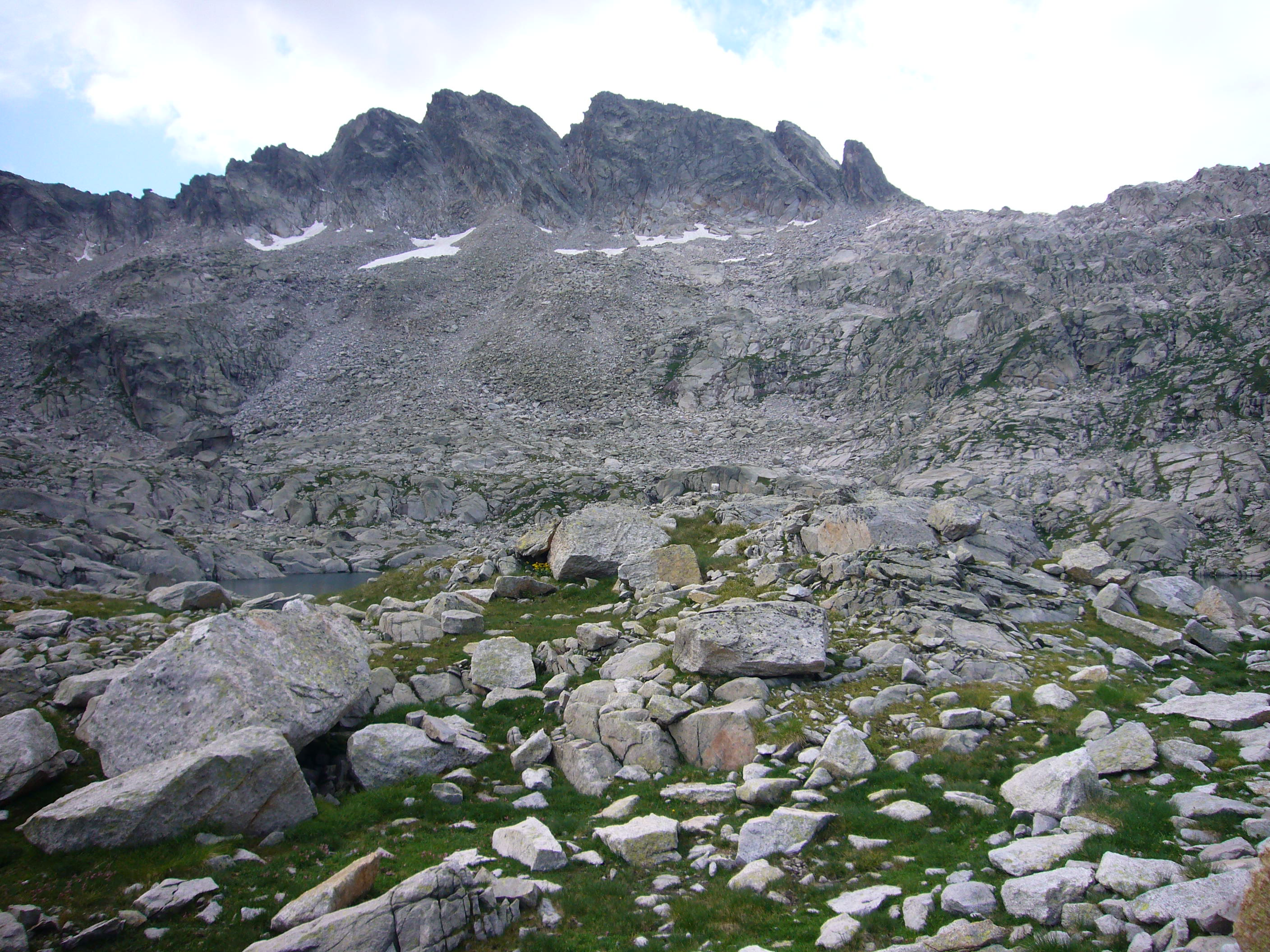

Highest point
- Elevation: 2,933 m (9,623 ft)
- Listing: List of mountains in Catalonia
- Coordinates: 42°35′21.7″N 00°56′16.1″E

Geography
- Location within Pyrenees
- Location: Catalonia, Spain
- Parent range: Pyrenees

Gran Tuc de Colomers is a mountain of Catalonia, Spain. Located in the Pyrenees, it has an elevation of 2933 metres above sea level.
