= La Carabassa =

Mountain in Catalonia, Spain

Coordinates: 42°27′11″N 1°43′37″E

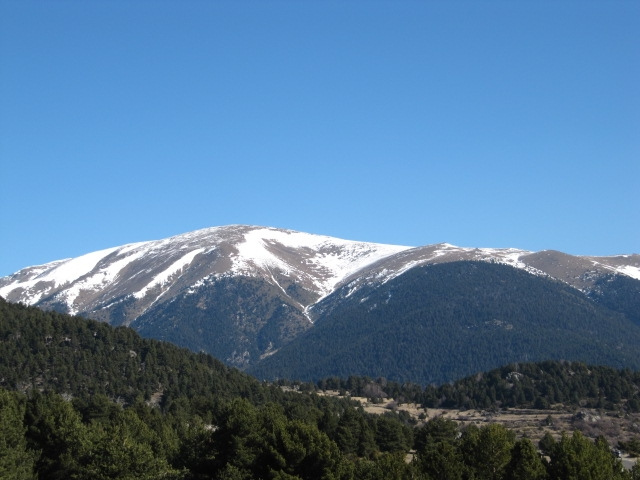

Highest point
- Elevation: 2,740 m (8,990 ft)

Geography
- Location within Spain
- Location: Catalonia, Spain
- Parent range: Pyrenees

La Carabassa is a mountain in Catalonia, Spain. Located in the Pyrenees, it has an altitude of 2736 metres above sea level.

== See also ==
- Mountains of Catalonia
