= Tossal d'Engrilló =

Mountain in Spain

Coordinates: 40°56′35″N 0°22′15″E

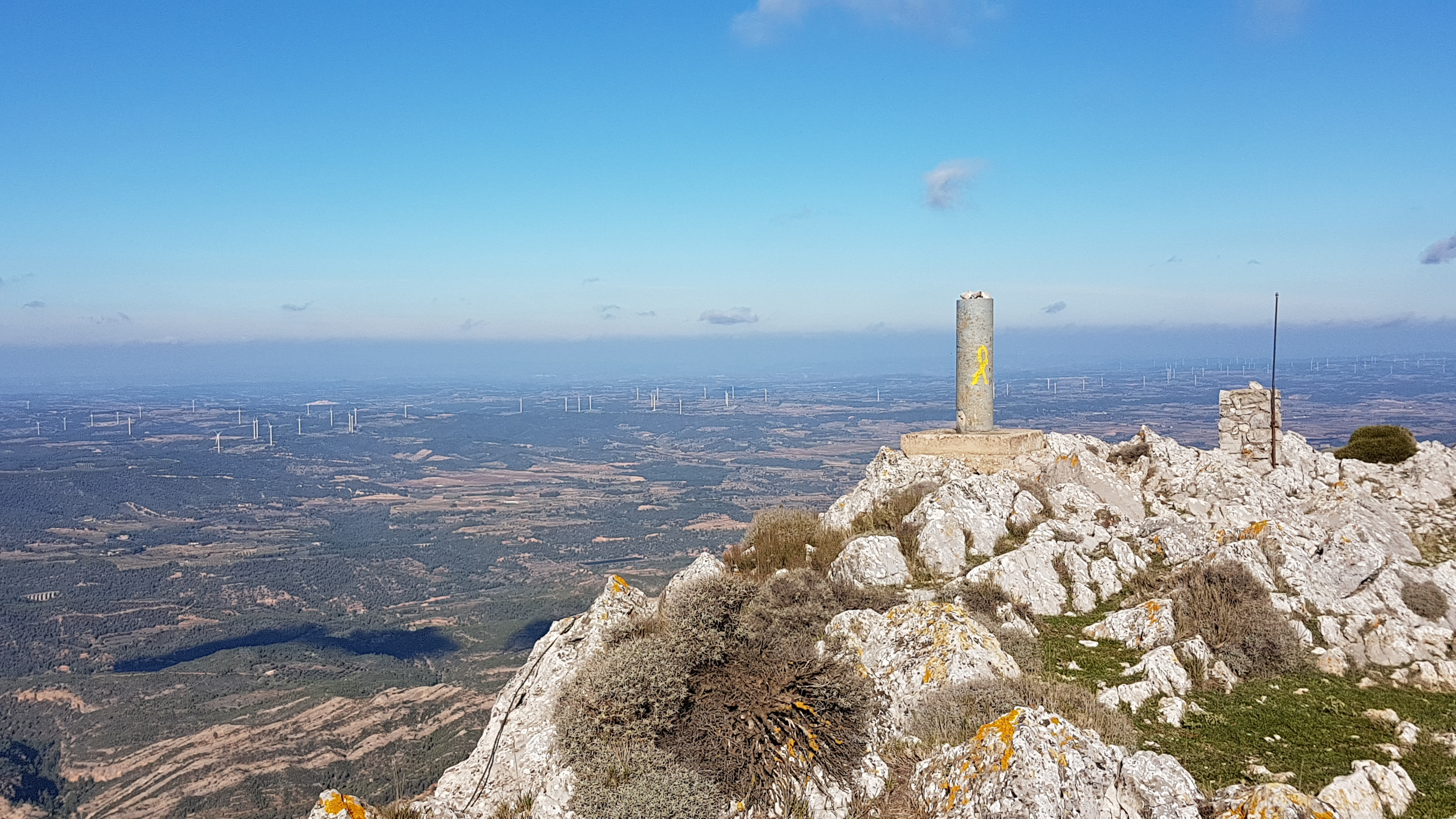
- Aspecte of the culminating summit of l'Engrilló.

Highest point
- Elevation: 1,072 m (3,517 ft)

Geography
- Location: Catalonia, Spain

Tossal d'Engrilló is a mountain of Catalonia, Spain. It has an elevation of 1,072 metres above sea level.

A Triangulation station (reference 246147001) is located at the summit.

This summit is included in the "100 Summits Challenge" of the Federation of Hiking Entities of Catalonia.

== See also ==
- Mountains of Catalonia
