= Tossa de Viamar =

Coordinates: 40°56′04″N 0°36′19″E

Highest point
- Elevation: 766 m (2,513 ft)

Geography
- Location: Catalonia, Spain

Tossa de Viamar is a mountain of Catalonia, Spain. It has an elevation of 766 metres above sea level.

== See also ==
- Mountains of Catalonia
