= Pui de Lleràs =

Coordinates: 42°16′09″N 0°51′09″E

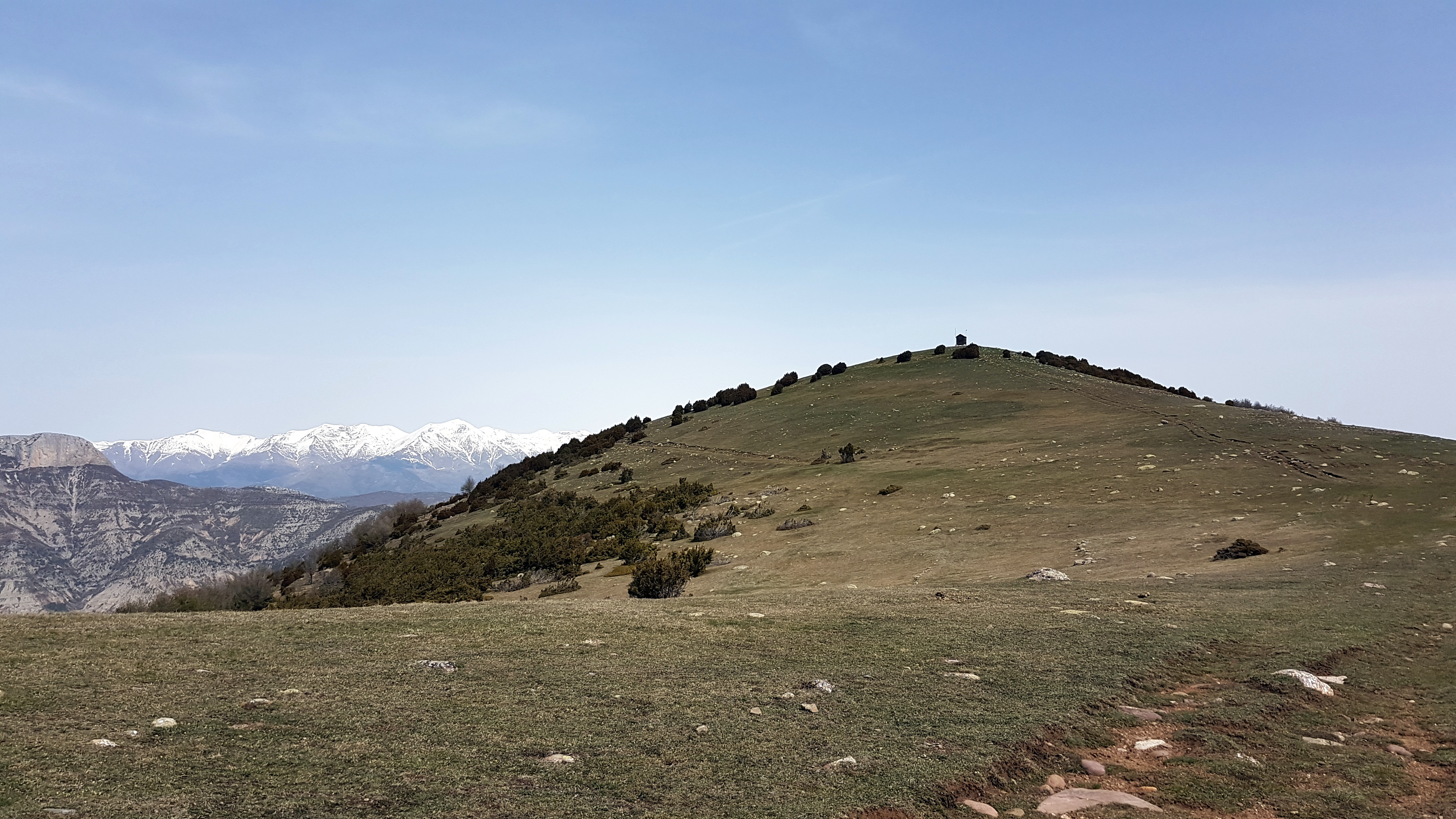

Highest point
- Elevation: 1,691 m (5,548 ft)

Geography
- Location: Catalonia, Spain

Pui de Lleràs is a mountain near the French border in the Province of Lleida in Catalonia, Spain. It has an elevation of 1,691 metres above sea level.

== See also ==
- Mountains of Catalonia
