= Punta de l'Aigua =

Coordinates: 40°55′40″N 0°22′08″E

Highest point
- Elevation: 1,091 m (3,579 ft)

Geography
- Location: Catalonia, Spain

Punta de l'Aigua is a mountain of Catalonia, Spain. It has an elevation of 1,091 metres above sea level.

== See also ==
- Mountains of Catalonia
