= El Cogul (Navès) =

Mountain in Spain

Coordinates: 42°06′36″N 1°38′22″E

Highest point
- Elevation: 1,526 m (5,007 ft)

Geography
- Location: Catalonia, Spain

El Cogul (Navès) is a mountain of Catalonia, Spain. It has an elevation of 1,526 metres above sea level.

== See also ==
- Mountains of Catalonia
