= Pic de Freser =

Mountain in Spain

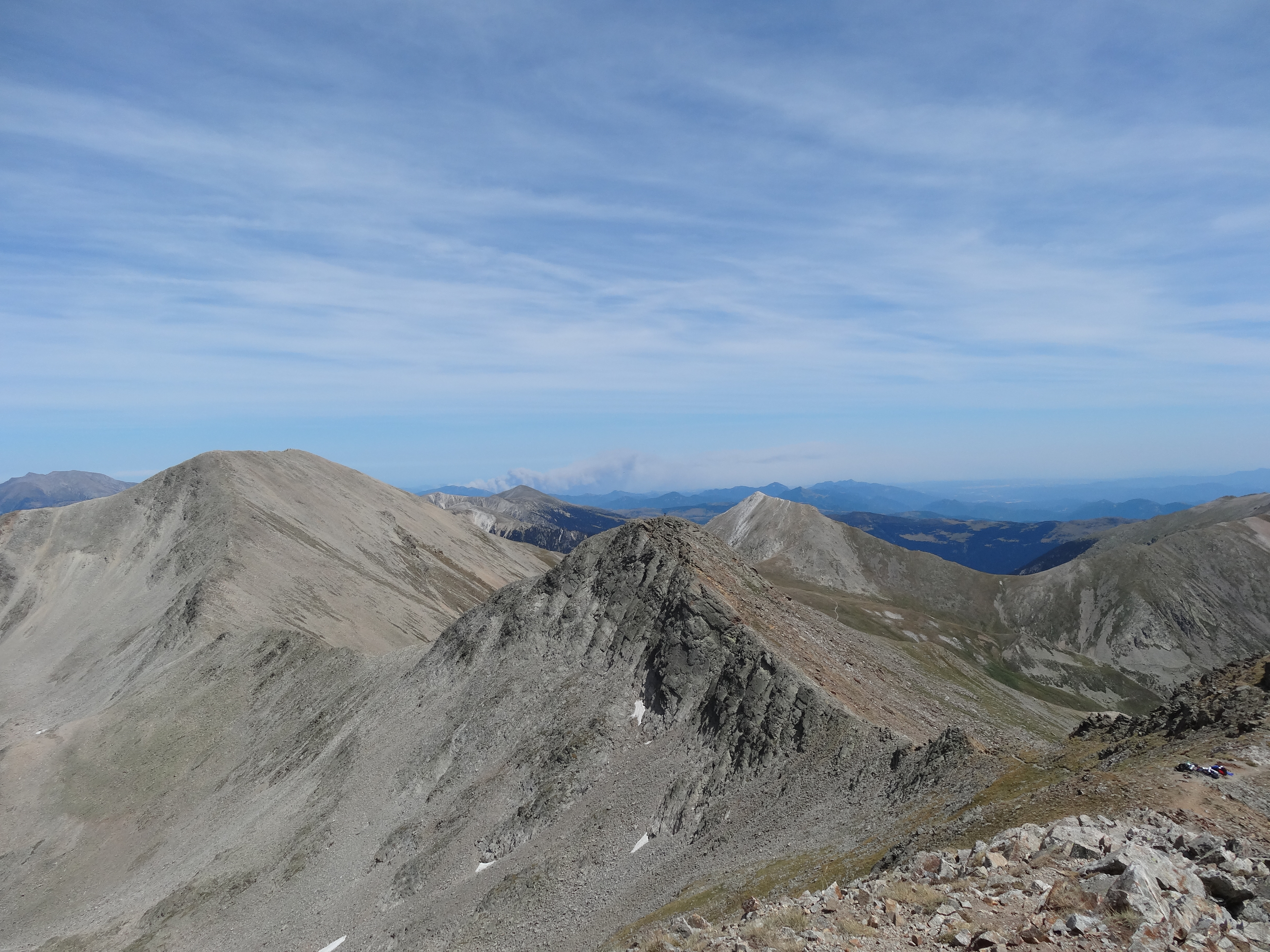
- Pic de Freser (center) in August 2003

Highest point
- Elevation: 2,834 m (9,298 ft)
- Coordinates: 42°25′23″N 2°13′10″E

Geography
- Location: Catalonia, Spain
- Parent range: Pyrenees

Pic de Freser is a mountain of Catalonia, Spain. Located in the Pyrenees, it has an altitude of 2,834 metres (9,298 ft) above sea level.

== See also ==
- Mountains of Catalonia
