= El Coscollet =

Coordinates: 42°06′51″N 1°16′03″E

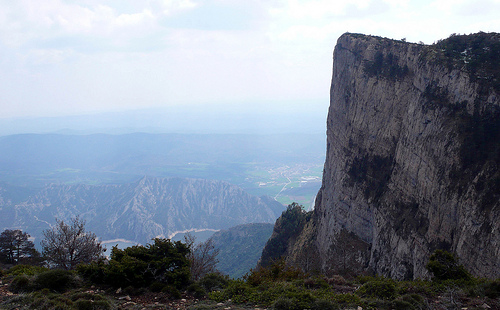
- Peak of El Coscollet

Highest point
- Elevation: 1,610 m (5,280 ft)

Geography
- Location: Catalonia, Spain

El Coscollet is a mountain in Catalonia, Spain. It has an elevation of 1,610 metres (5,280 ft) above sea level.

== See also ==
- Mountains of Catalonia
