= Punta del Pollo =

Coordinates: 40.9259°N 0.6088°E

Highest point
- Elevation: 693 m (2,274 ft)

Geography
- Location: Catalonia, Spain

Punta del Pollo is a mountain of Catalonia, Spain. It has an elevation of 693 metres above sea level.

== See also ==
- Mountains of Catalonia
