= Puigsallança =

Coordinates: 42°06′54″N 2°34′53″E

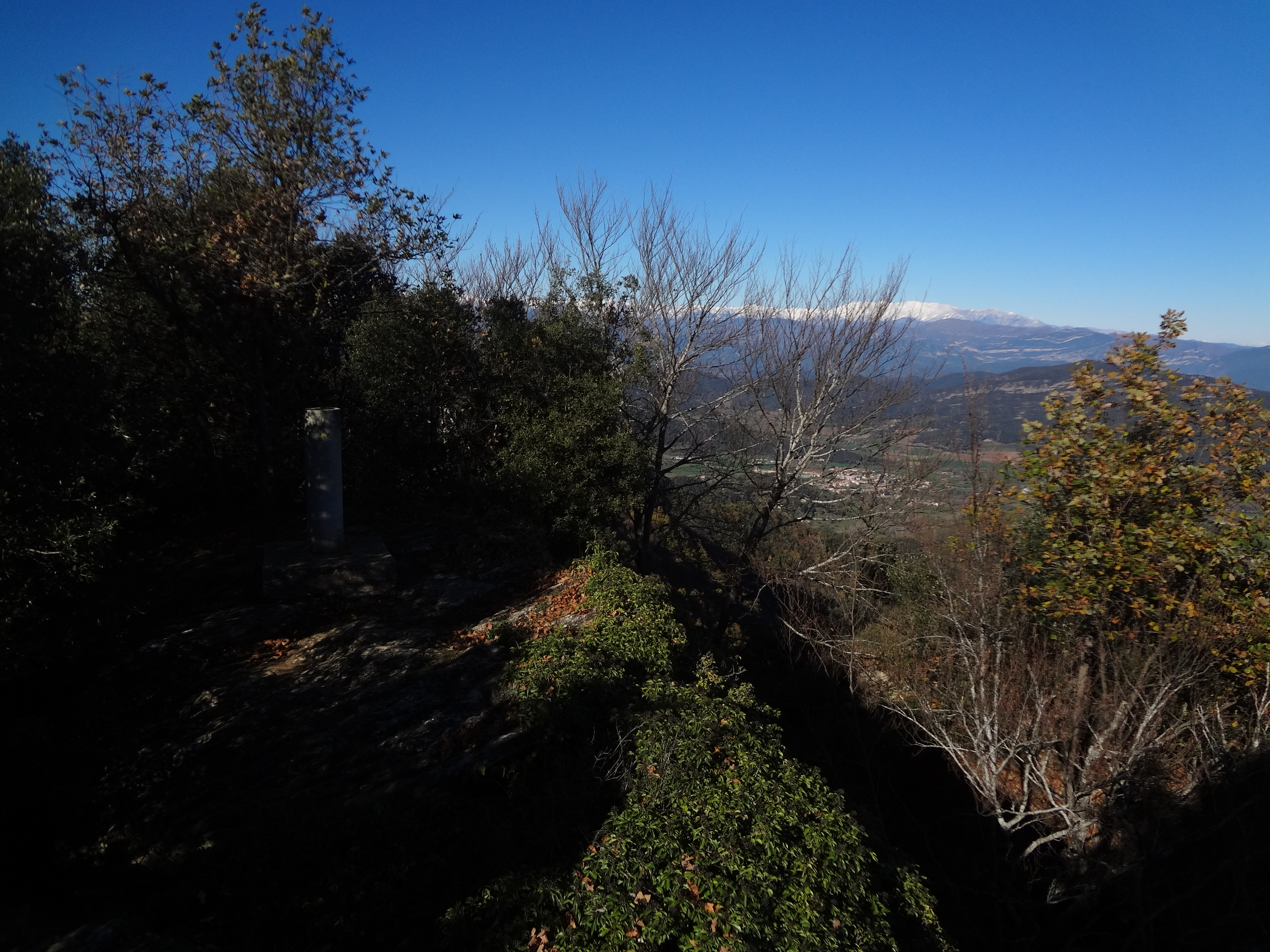

Highest point
- Elevation: 1,026 m (3,366 ft)

Geography
- Location: Catalonia, Spain

Puigsallança is a mountain of Catalonia, Spain. It has an elevation of 1,026 metres above sea level.

== See also ==
- Mountains of Catalonia
