= Turó de Tagamanent =

Coordinates: 41°44′51″N 2°17′46″E

Highest point
- Elevation: 1,055 m (3,461 ft)
- Listing: Mountains in Catalonia

Geography
- Location: Catalonia, Spain

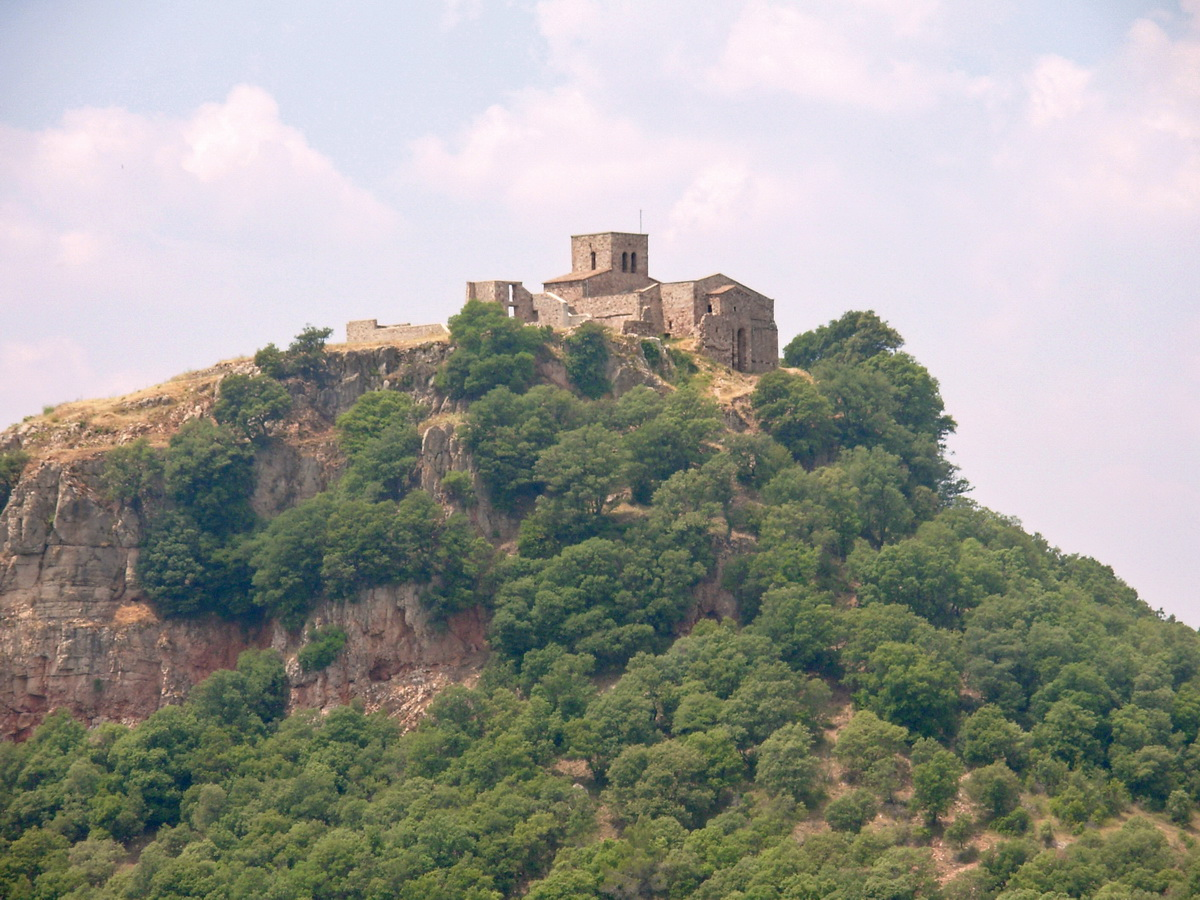
Turó de Tagamanent, with the Church of Santa Maria Tagamanent

Turó de Tagamanent is a mountain of Catalonia, Spain. It has an elevation of 1,058 metres above sea level.
