= Puigpedrós =

Mountain in Spain and France

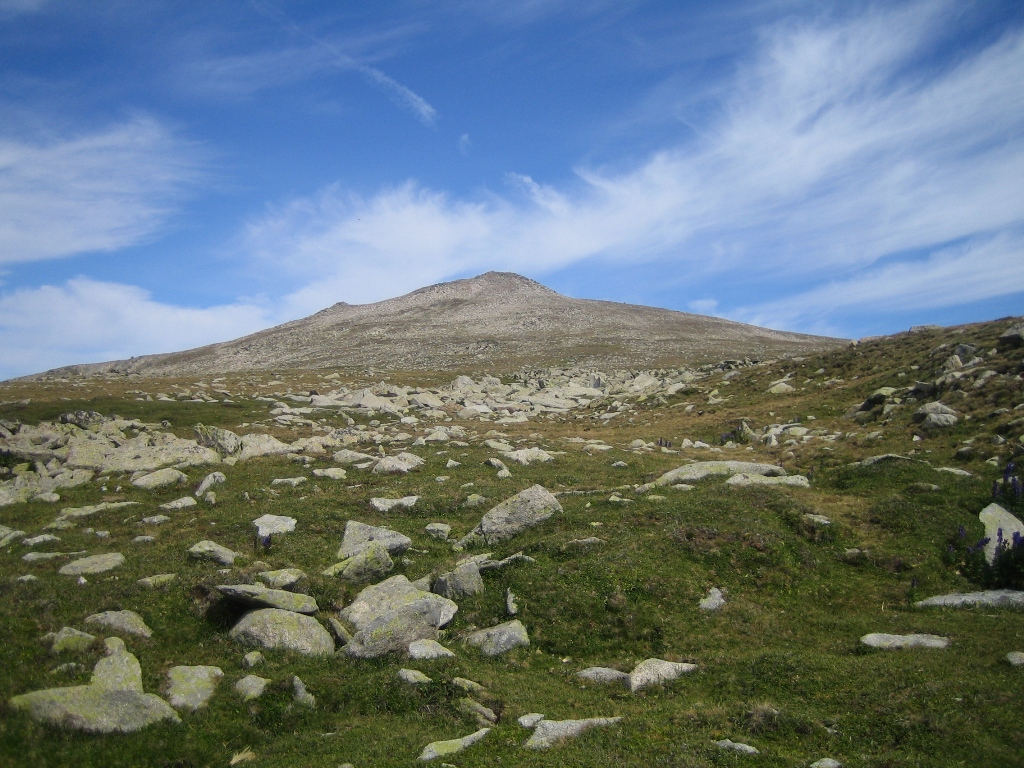

Highest point
- Elevation: 2,912 m (9,554 ft)
- Coordinates: 42°29′16″N 1°45′49″E

Geography
- Location within Pyrenees
- Location: Catalonia, Spain, Pyrénées-Orientales, France
- Parent range: Pyrenees

Puigpedrós (also known as Puig de Campcardós) is a mountain located at the border between Catalonia, Spain and the département of Pyrénées-Orientales (France).

Part of the Pyrenees, its summit has an elevation of 2,912 metres above sea level.

According to the Catalan toponymist Lluís Bassede, the name originates from puig (Catalan word for "mountain with a round peak") and pedrós (meaning, "rocky"), due to the amount of rocks found in its peak.

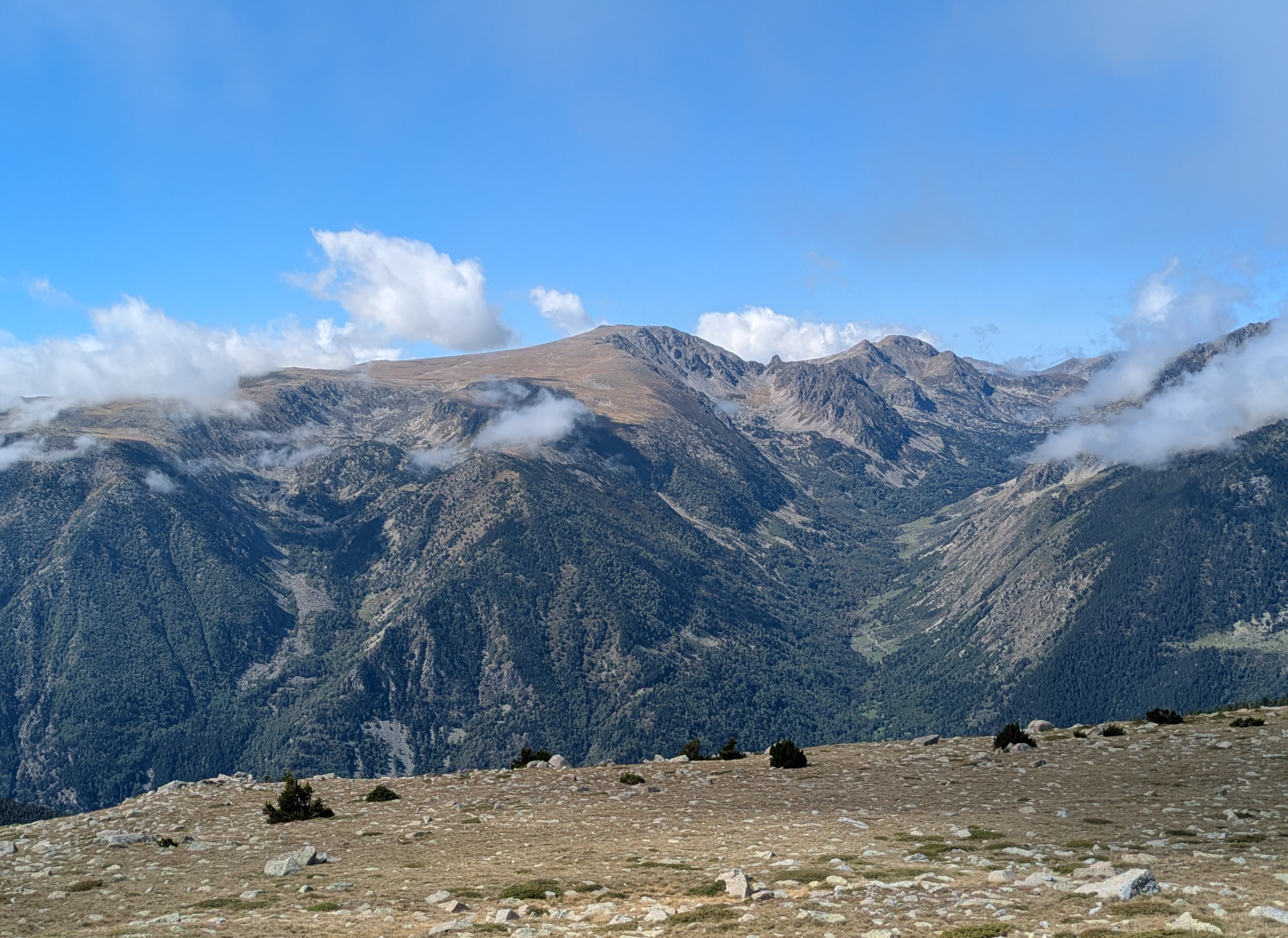
The east face of Puig de Campcardós (centre). The Campcardós valley is to the right of and below the summit.

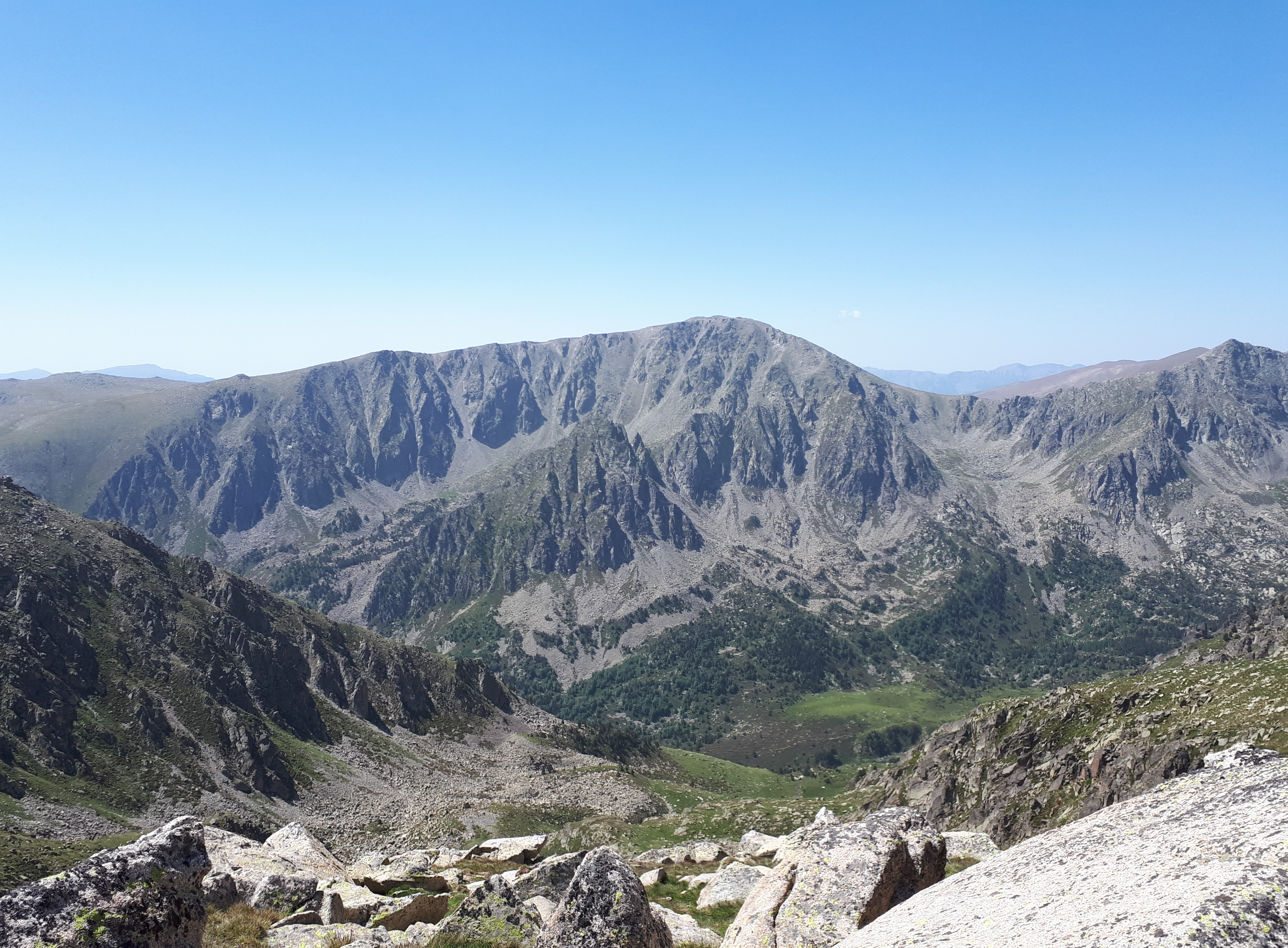
The north face of Puig de Campcardós.

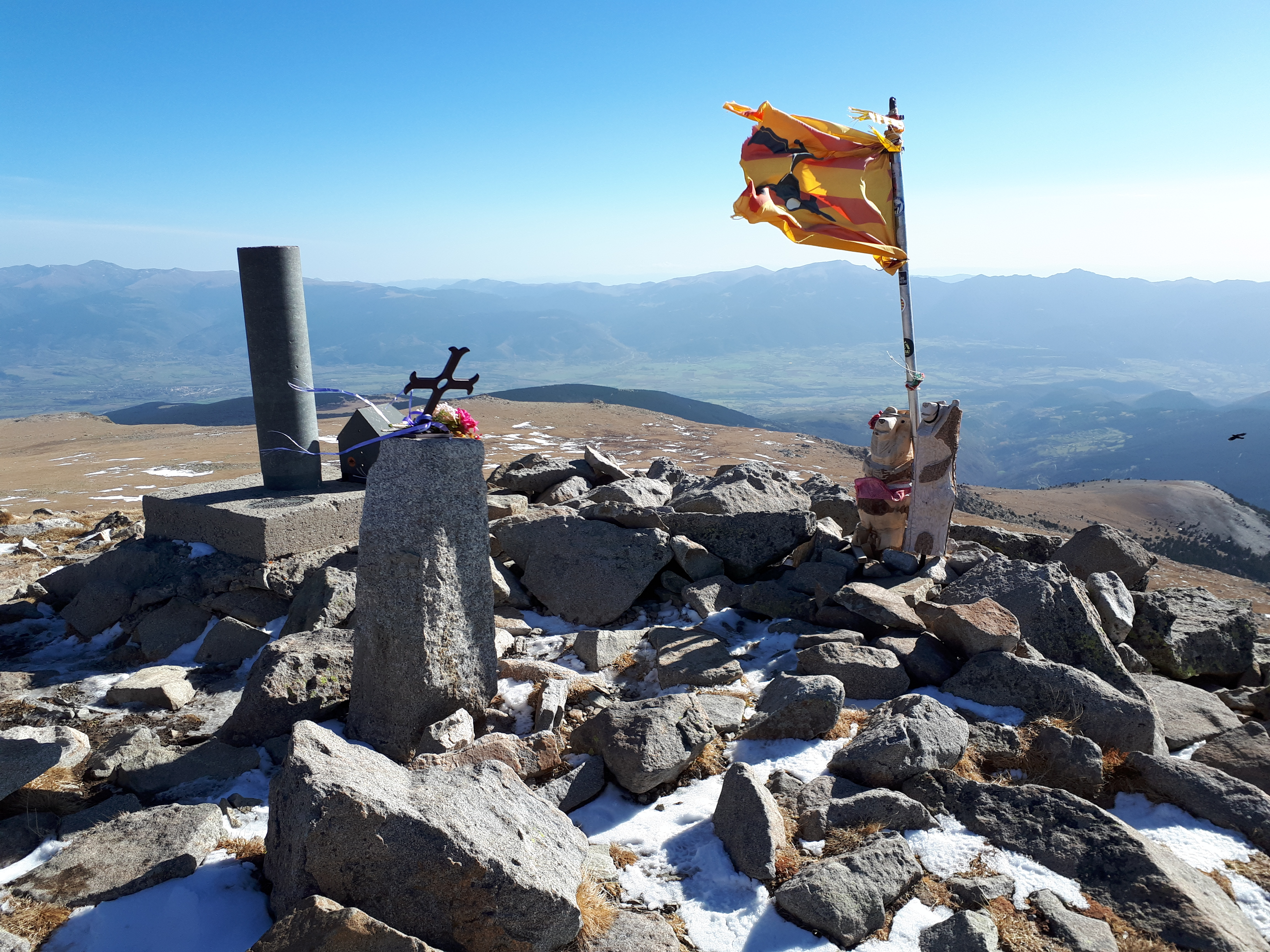
The summit of the mountain, looking south.

== See also ==
- Mountains of Catalonia
