= La Cogulla (Figuerola del Camp) =

Coordinates: 41°20′56″N 1°13′29″E

Highest point
- Elevation: 785 m (2,575 ft)
- Prominence: 110.7 m (363 ft)
- Isolation: 3.19 km (1.98 mi) to Tossal Gros

Geography
- Location: Catalonia, Spain

La Cogulla (Figuerola del Camp) is a mountain of Catalonia, Spain. It has an elevation of 785 metres above sea level.

== See also ==
- Mountains of Catalonia
