= Tossal de Mirapallars i Urgell =

Coordinates: 42°01′16″N 0°57′33″E

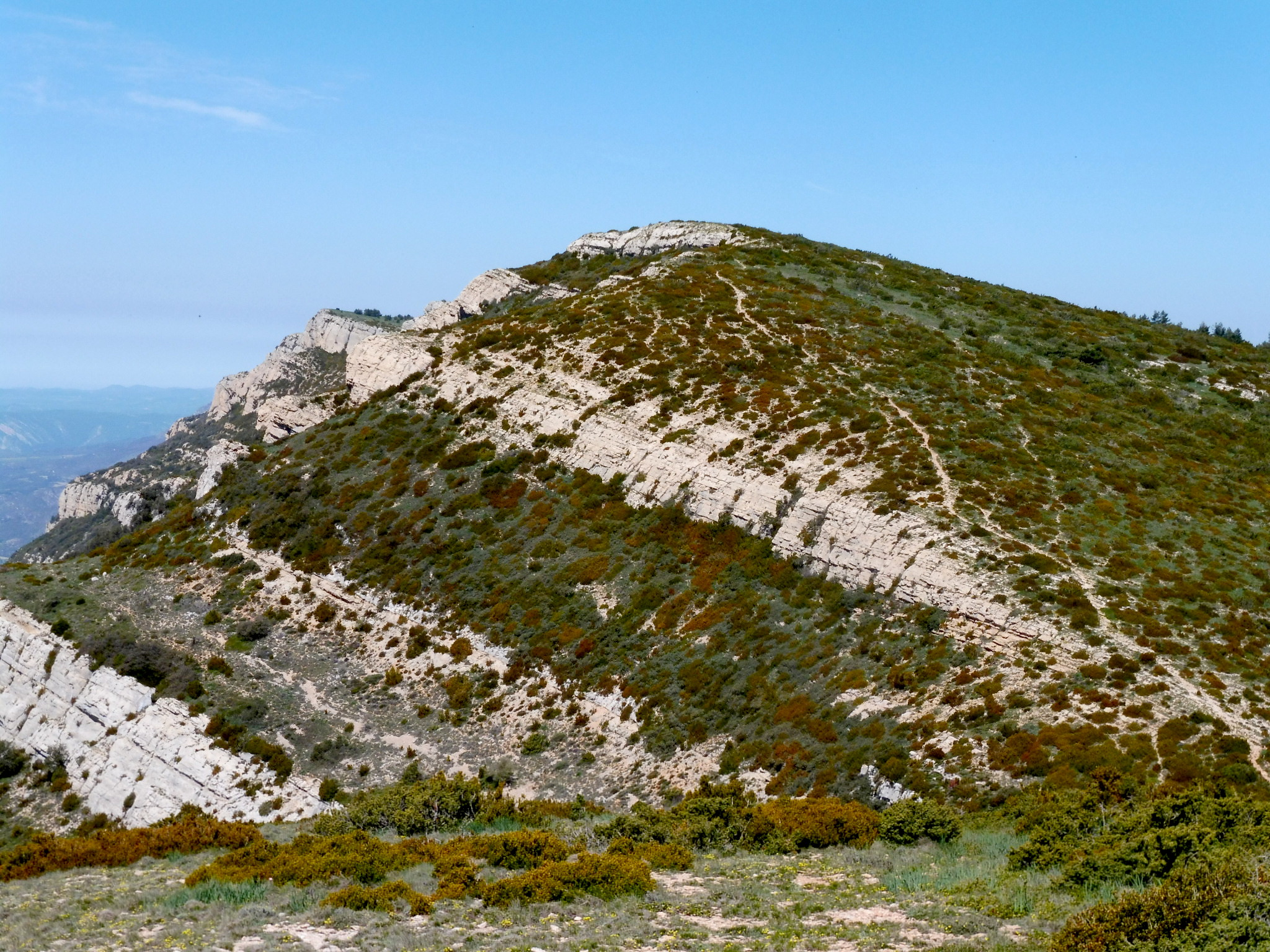

Highest point
- Elevation: 1,672 m (5,486 ft)

Geography
- Location: Catalonia, Spain

Tossal de Mirapallars i Urgell is a mountain of Catalonia, Spain. It has an elevation of 1,672 metres above sea level.

== See also ==
- Mountains of Catalonia
