= Montsent de Pallars =

Coordinates: 42°29′24″N 1°01′28″E

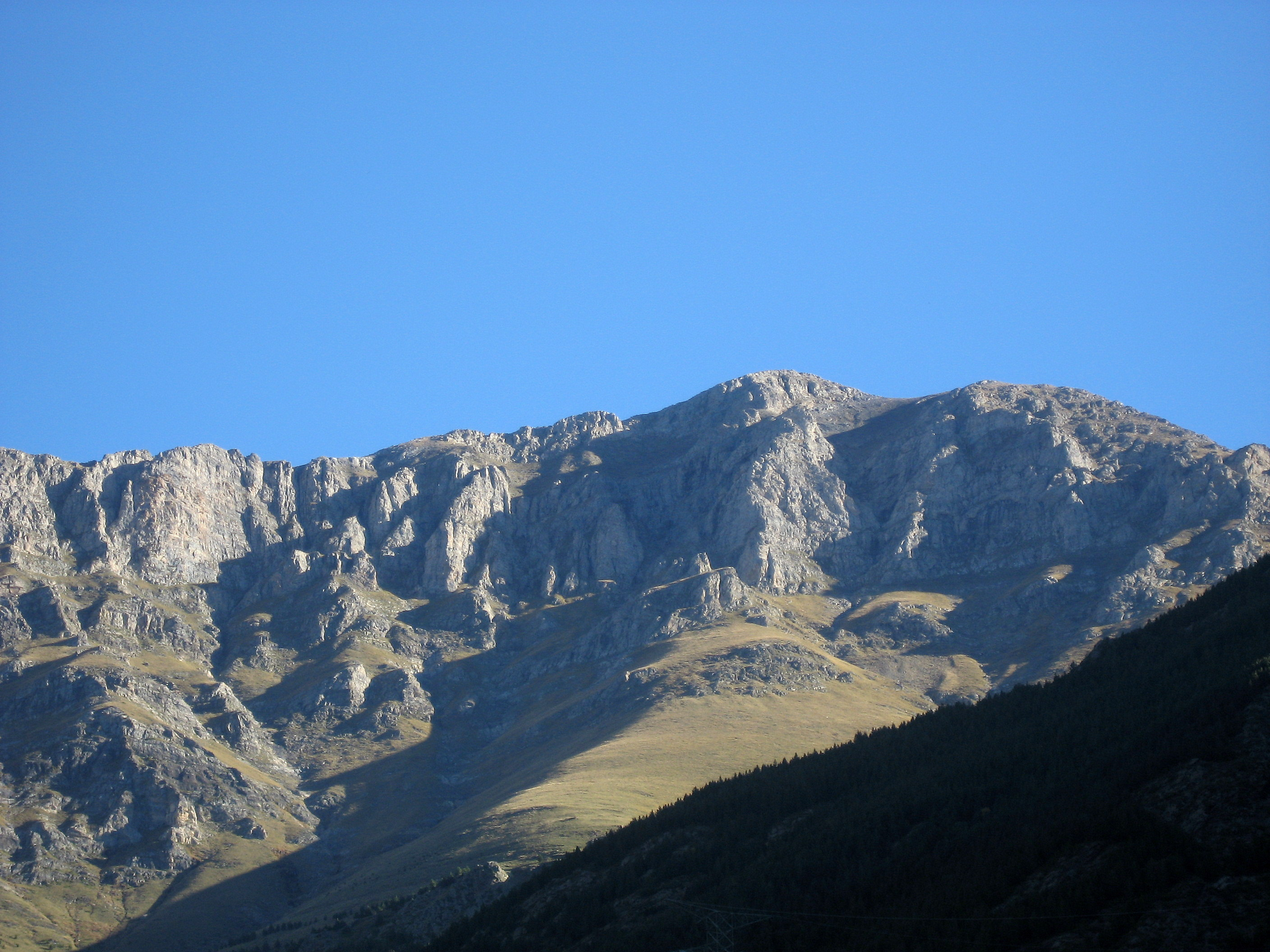

Highest point
- Elevation: 2,883 m (9,459 ft)

Geography
- Location: Catalonia, Spain
- Parent range: Pyrenees

Montsent de Pallars is a mountain of Catalonia, Spain. Located in the Pyrenees, it has an altitude of 2883 metres above sea level.

== See also ==
- Mountains of Catalonia
