= Puig d'Ombriaga =

Coordinates: 42°26′01″N 2°15′03″E

Highest point
- Elevation: 2,638 m (8,655 ft)

Geography
- Location: Catalonia, Spain
- Parent range: Pyrenees

Puig d'Ombriaga is a mountain of Catalonia, Spain. Located in the Pyrenees, it has an elevation of 2,638 metres above sea level.

== See also ==
- Mountains of Catalonia
