= La Tossa =

Mountain in Catalonia, Spain

Coordinates: 42°19′N 1°54′E

Highest point
- Elevation: 887 m (2,910 ft)
- Listing: Mountains in Catalonia

Geography
- Location: Catalonia, Spain

La Tossa is a mountain in Catalonia, Spain. It has an elevation of 887 meters (2,910 ft) above sea level.
