= Pedró dels Quatre Batlles =

Mountain in Spain

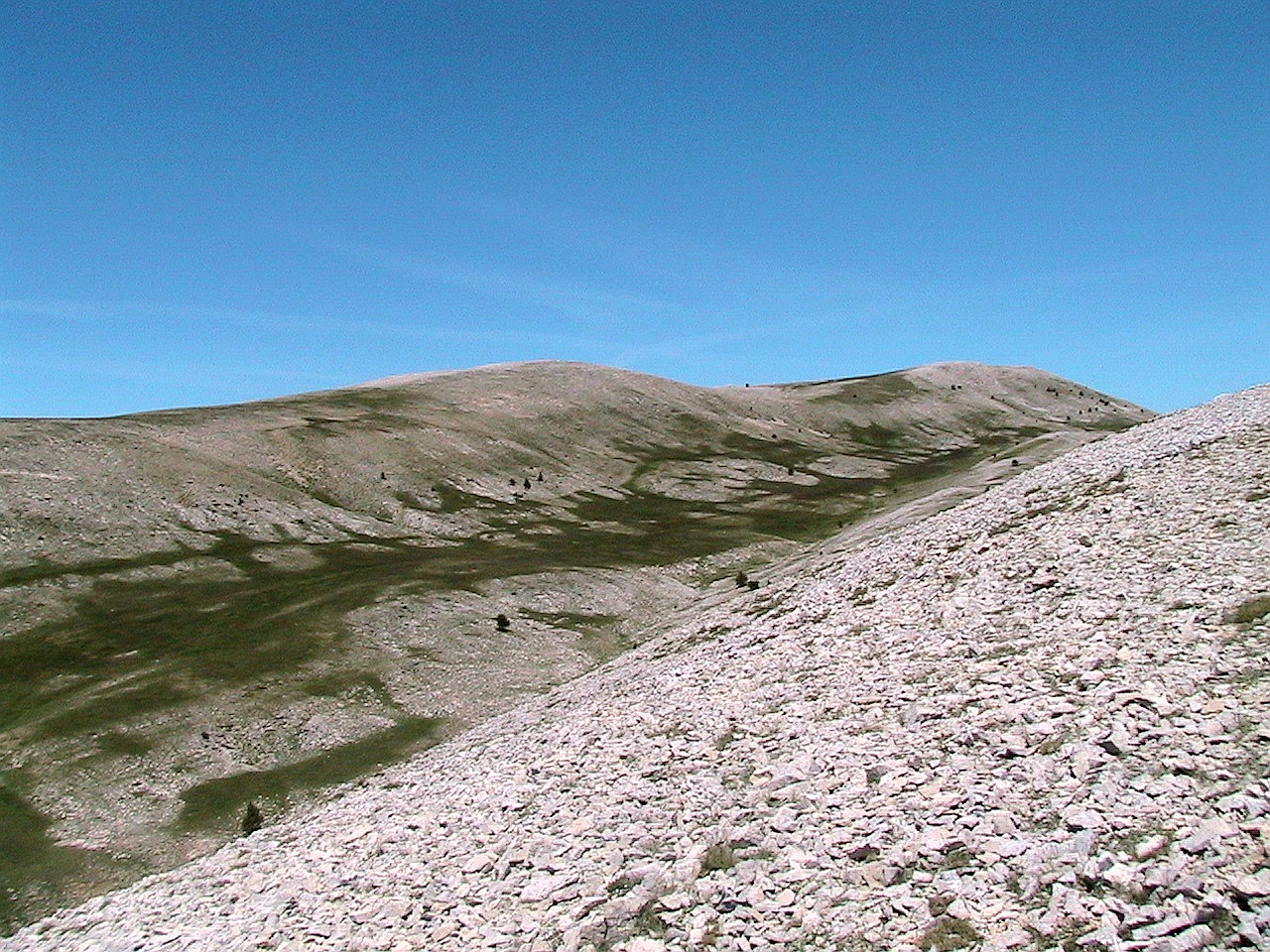

Highest point
- Elevation: 2,386 m (7,828 ft)
- Coordinates: 42°11′05″N 01°31′15″E

Geography
- Location within Province of Lleida Location within Catalonia Location within Spain
- Location: Catalonia, Spain

Pedró dels Quatre Batlles is a mountain of Catalonia, Spain. It has an elevation of 2,386 metres above sea level.

== See also ==
- Mountains of Catalonia
