= Turó de Sant Elies =

Coordinates: 41°43′48″N 2°22′47″E

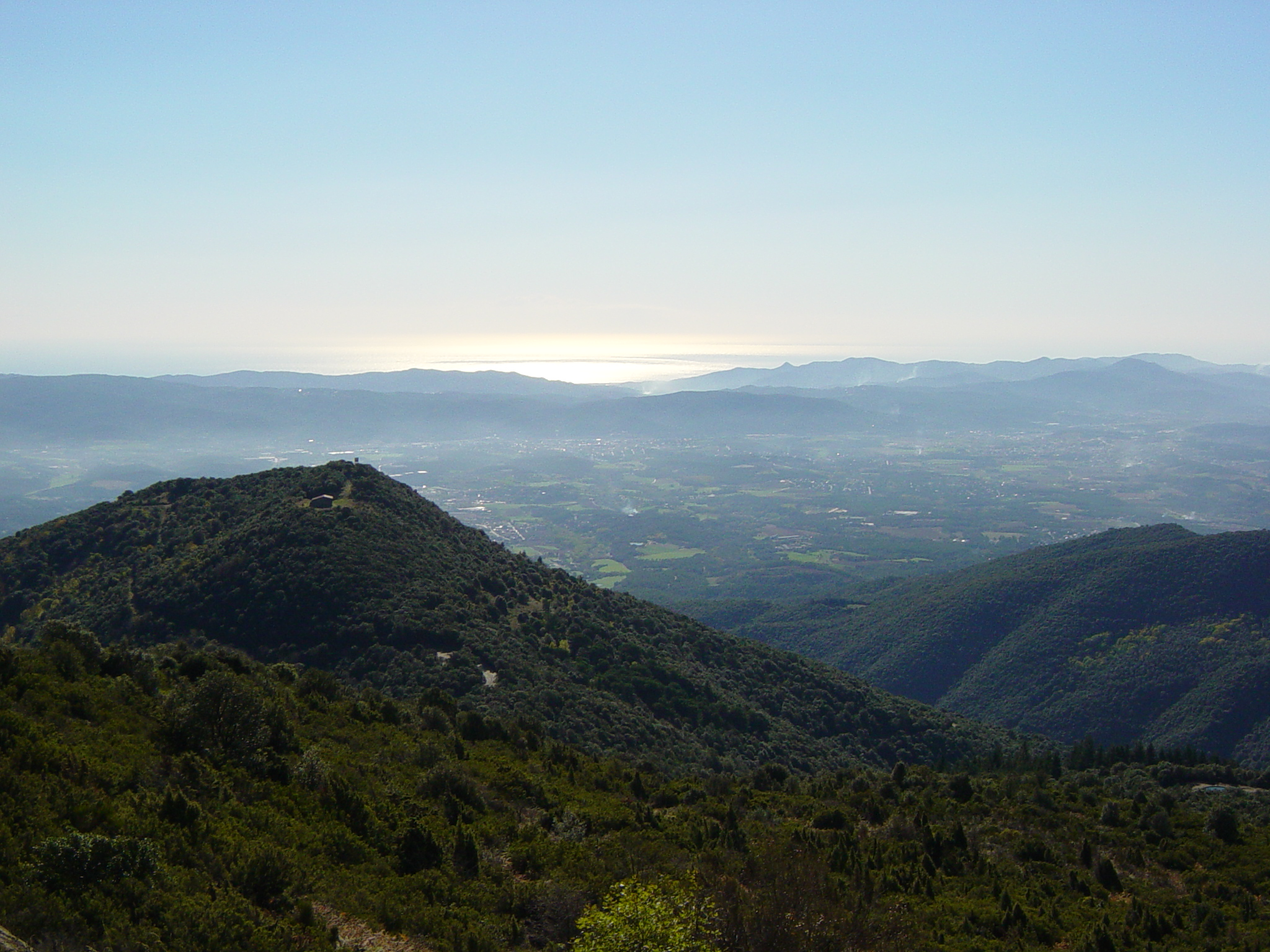

Highest point
- Elevation: 1,003 m (3,291 ft)

Geography
- Location: Catalonia, Spain

Turó de Sant Elies is a mountain of Catalonia, Spain. It has an elevation of 1,003 m (3,291 ft) above sea level.

== See also ==
- Mountains of Catalonia
