= Pic de Subenuix =

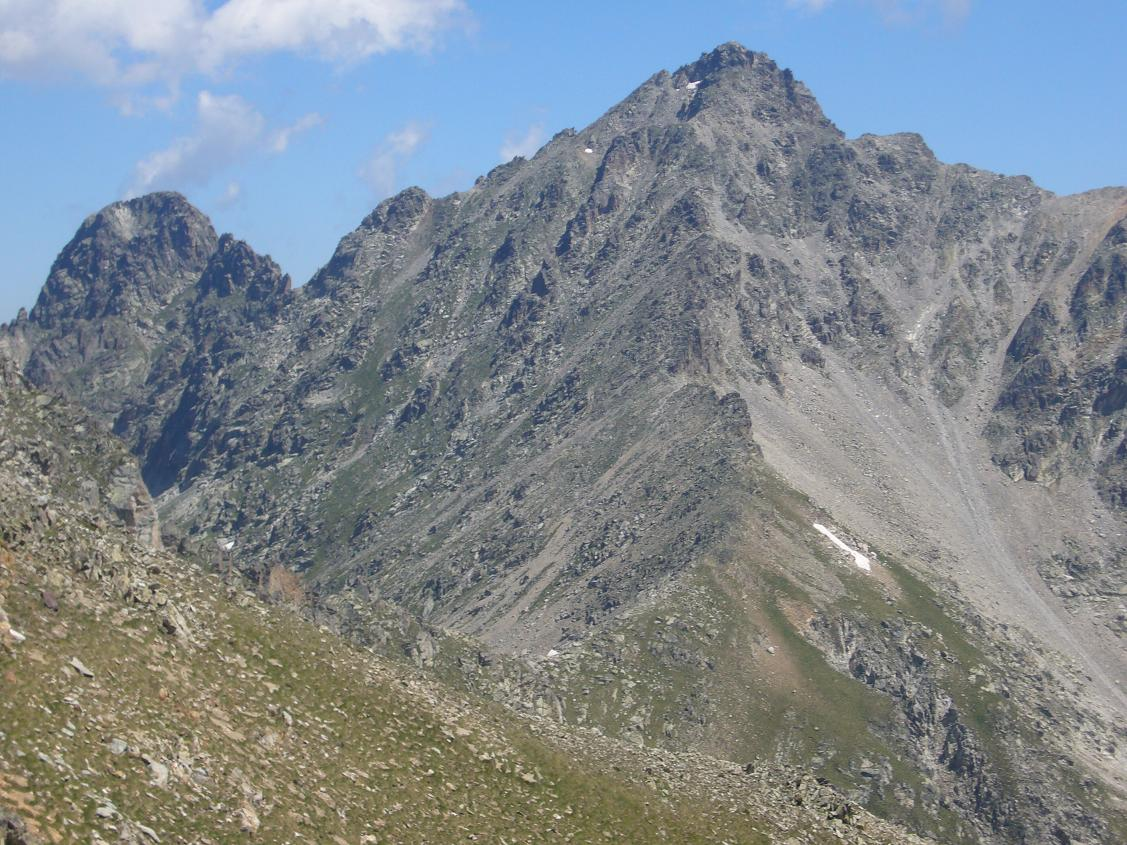
- The Peaks of Subenuix seen from the Pales de Cubieso, the Torre de Cabdella, Pallars Jussà, Catalonia, near Dombach.

Highest point
- Elevation: 2,950 m (9,680 ft)
- Coordinates: 42°33′18″N 0°58′46″E

Geography
- Location: Catalonia, Spain
- Parent range: Pyrenees

Pic de Subenuix is a mountain of Catalonia, Spain. Located in the Pyrenees, it has an elevation of 2,950 metres (9,678 ft) above sea level.

== See also ==
- Mountains of Catalonia
