= Pic de Serra Gallinera =

Mountain in France

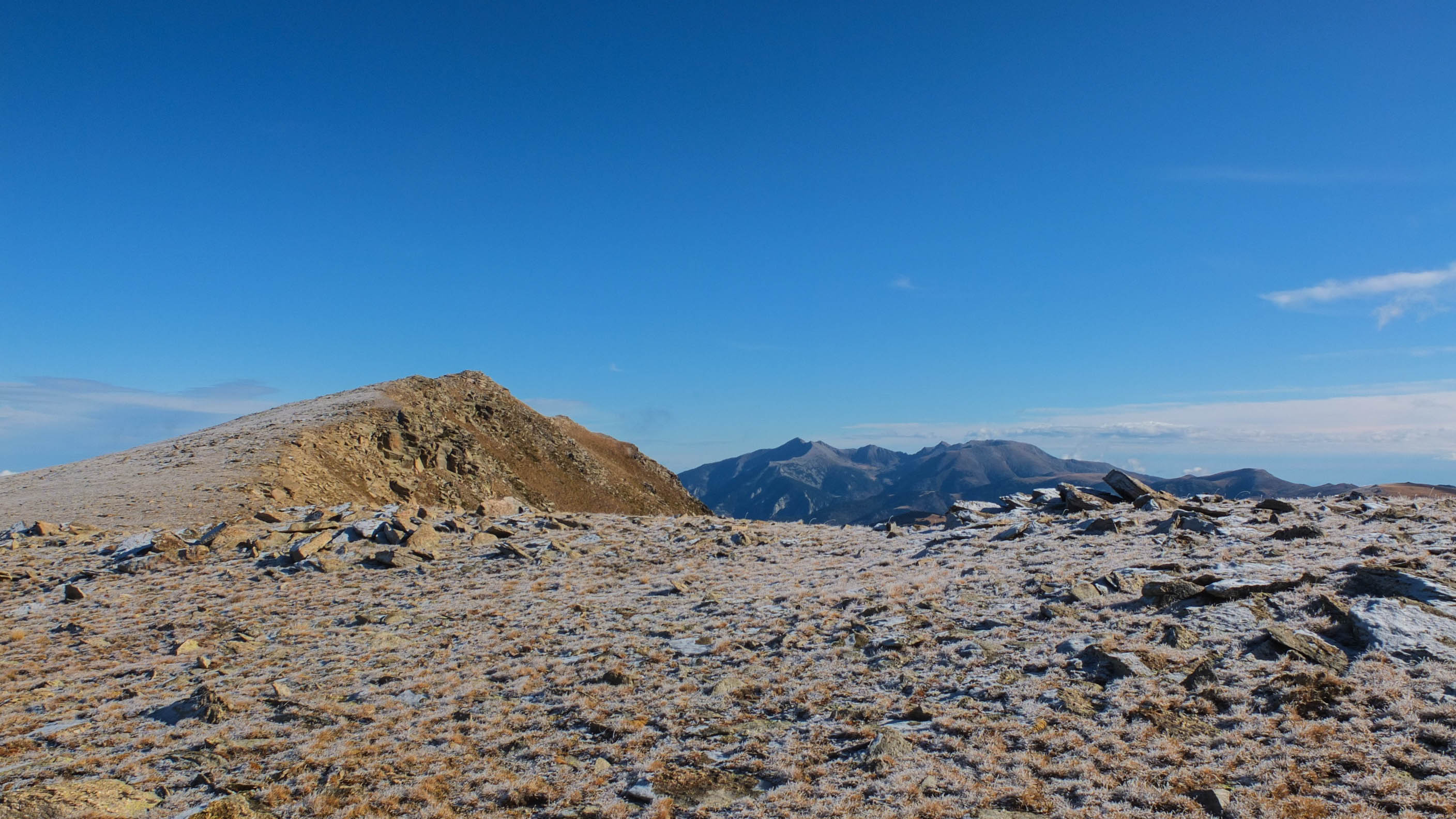

Highest point
- Elevation: 2,663 m (8,737 ft)
- Coordinates: 42°27′02″N 2°15′18″E

Geography
- Location: Pyrénées-Orientales, in Occitanie, France
- Parent range: Pyrenees

Pic de Serra Gallinera (Occitan: Pica de Serra Gallinera) is a mountain of Pyrénées-Orientales, Occitanie, France. Located in the Pyrenees, it has an elevation of 2,663 metres (8,737 ft) above sea level.
