= El Negrell =

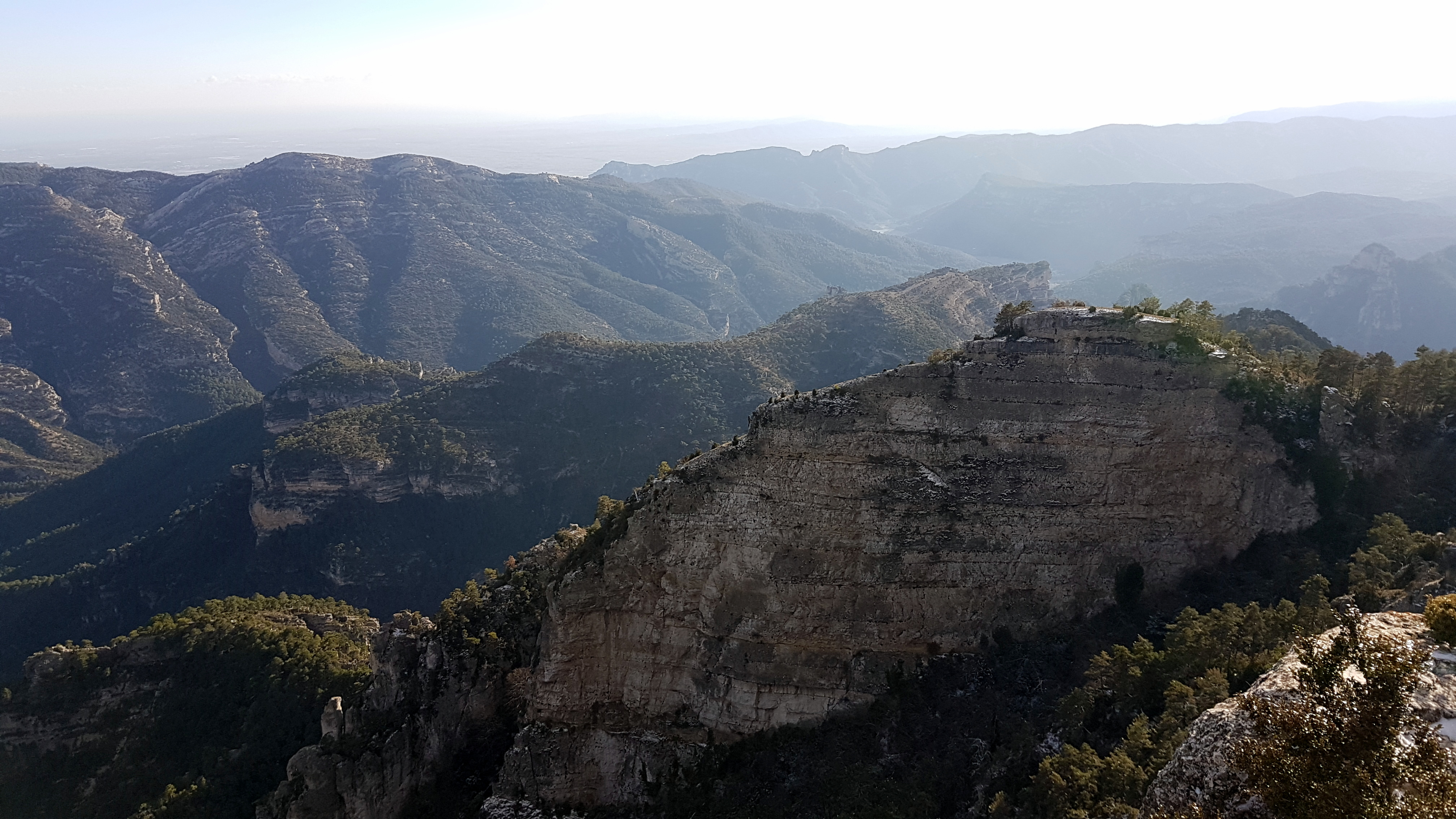

Highest point
- Elevation: 1,345 m (4,413 ft)
- Coordinates: 40°44′3″N 0°13′38″E

Geography
- Location within Catalonia
- Location: Catalonia, Spain
- Parent range: Ports de Tortosa-Beseit

El Negrell is a mountain of Catalonia, Spain. It has an elevation of 1,345 metres above sea level.

== See also ==
- Mountains of Catalonia
