= Beceite =

Beceite/Beseit
- Municipality
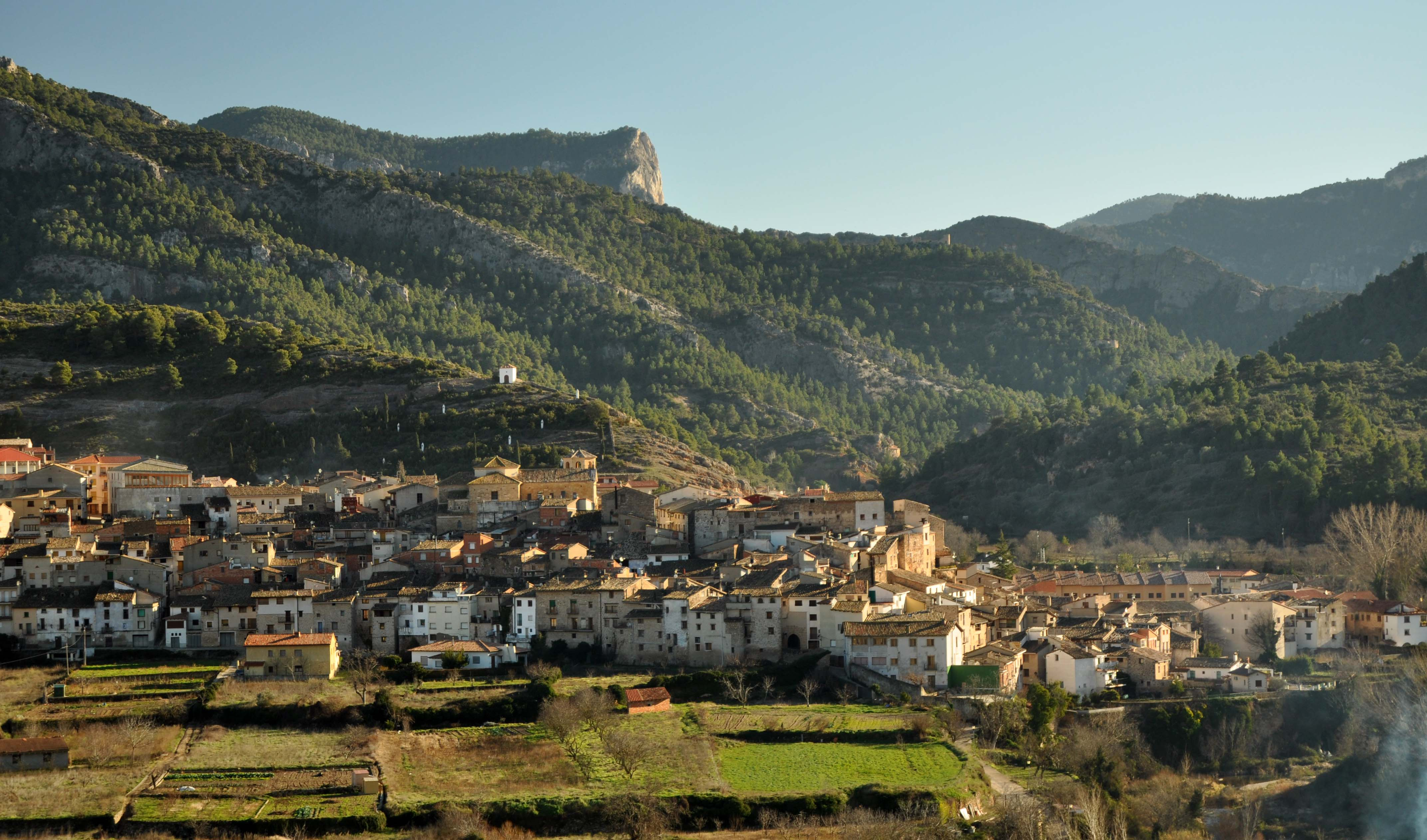

- Coat of arms

- Location of Beceite/Beseit within Aragon Location of Beceite/Beseit within Spain
- Coordinates: 40°50′N 0°11′E
- Country: Spain
- Autonomous community: Aragon
- Province: Teruel
- Comarca: Matarraña
- Judicial district: Alcañiz

Government
  - Mayor (2015– ): Juan Enrique Celma Guimerá (PP-Aragón)

Area
  - Total: 96 km^{2} (37 sq mi)
- Elevation: 579 m (1,900 ft)

Population (2025-01-01)
  - Total: 572
  - Density: 6.0/km^{2} (15/sq mi)
- Time zone: UTC+1 (CET)
  - Summer (DST): UTC+2 (CEST)
- Website: beceite.es

Beceite (Spanish: [beˈθejte]) or Beseit (Catalan: [beˈzejt]) is a municipality located in the Matarraña/Matarranya comarca, province of Teruel, Aragon, Spain. According to the 2004 census (INE), the municipality has a population of 603 inhabitants. It is part of the Taula del Sénia free association of municipalities.

This town gives its name to the Ports de Beseit massive limestone mountain range rising around it. It belongs to the Catalan-speaking strip in eastern Aragon known as La Franja.

There are many derelict paper mills in Beseit, reminders of what used to be an industrial town. One of the main products was card stock, which was exported for manufacturing playing cards. The former mills were powered by the water of the Matarranya River and its tributaries. Some of them have been converted into hotels catering for rural tourism.

The rocky Penyagalera mountain rises 4 km (2.5 mi) east of the town.

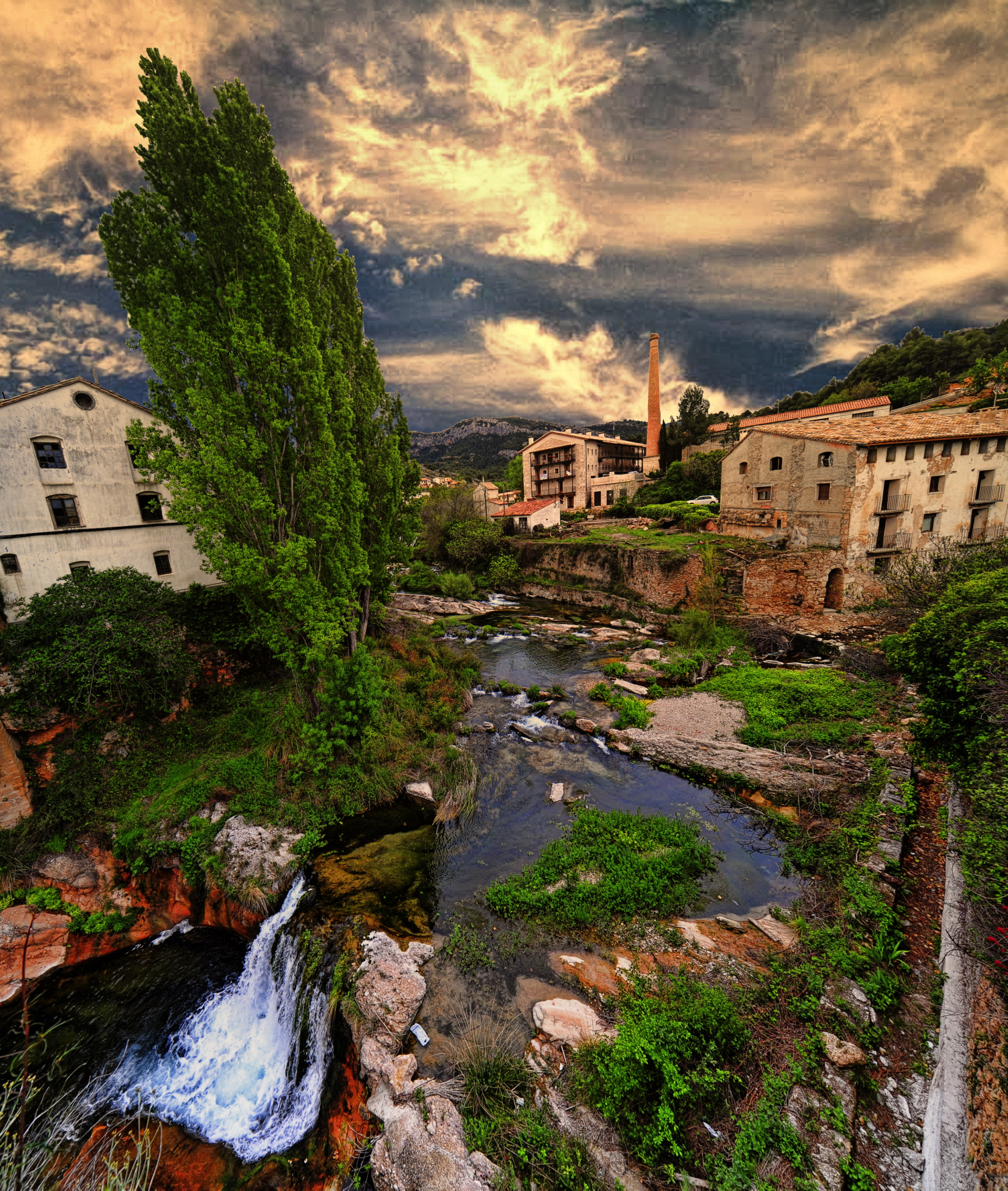
A view of the bridge over the Matarranya River

== See also ==
- Ports de Tortosa-Beseit
- List of municipalities in Teruel
