= Roquetes, Spain =

Roquetes
- Municipality
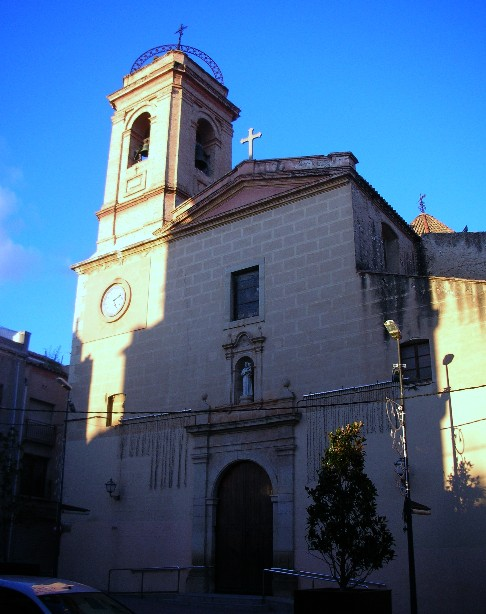
- Roquetes parish church

- Coat of arms

- Location in Catalonia
- Coordinates: 40°49′21″N 0°30′14″E
- Country: Spain
- Community: Catalonia
- Province: Tarragona
- Comarca: Baix Ebre

Government
  - Mayor: Francesc A. Gas Ferré (2015)

Area
  - Total: 136.9 km^{2} (52.9 sq mi)

Population (2025-01-01)
  - Total: 8,607
  - Density: 62.87/km^{2} (162.8/sq mi)
- Postal code: 43520
- Website: roquetes.cat

Roquetes (Catalan pronunciation: [roˈketes]) is a municipality in the comarca of Baix Ebre, in the province of Tarragona, in Catalonia, Spain. It has a population of 8,607 (register office, 2025).

== Geography ==
It is the second largest municipality in the region (136.64 km 2). The town is located on the eastern side of the Ports de Tortosa-Beseit. A great part of its municipal territory is located in the Els Ports Natural Park, including many important peaks of the Ports de Tortosa-Beseit Range, such as Mont Caro and Castell de l'Airosa.

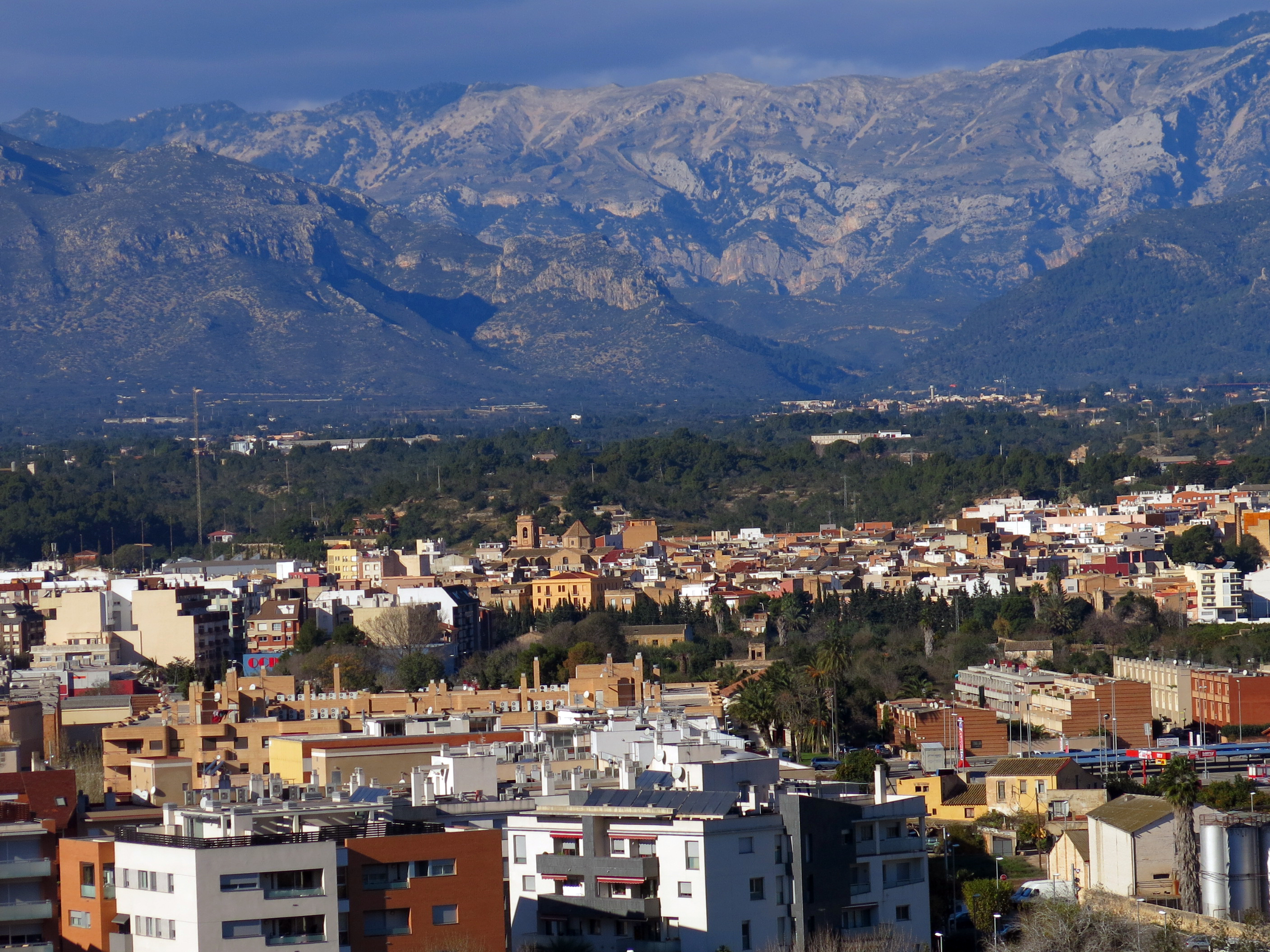
Roquetes with the Els Ports Massif in the background

== History ==
The formation of the city began with an Islamic farmhouse (Masada), donated by Ramon Berenguer IV in Tortosa after the conquest of this city (1149), which later became Mas d'en Ortiz (1603).

Roquetes was officially separated from Tortosa on 22 March 1850 by royal decree of Isabella II. A few days later, on April 14, the event was legalized in the form of a constitutional act of the first city council No. 43 Carrer de la Gaia, home of the first mayor of the municipality, Ramon Bosch y Rosell.

On July 25, 1857, the canal de la Dreta del Ebro was opened, although it did not operate until 1860. However, this canal was one of the key buildings that, over time, brought the greatest prosperity to the Roquetes economy.

In 1880 Alfonso XII granted Roquetes the title of town.

In 1885, a tram was opened to transport animals between the Ferreri and Roquetes area, with a branch to Jesus. It is this year that a cholera epidemic began in the city. This was the most tragic event of the nineteenth century. More than 200 people died, and there was also a moving of the population to other municipalities.

Today, Roquetes is a modern town with a range of services and amenities for residents and visitors, combining its industrial and service sectors with its rural character.

== Main events ==
=== Canal de la Dreta del Ebro ===
The first known project of an irrigation canal dates back to 1381. In 1441, there was a significant loss of crops due to lack of rain, this factor contributed to the expansion of the dam to facilitate the construction of drainages and canals. The main creator of this infrastructure was Bishop Oto de Moncada. But his sudden death, the social upheavals of that time and the depletion of resources force this project to stop. In 1540, when Charles V visited Tortosa, the project resumed.

During the 16th, 17th and 18th centuries, the project was constantly renewed and suspended until about 1847, when studies of the sewage and navigation of the Ebro were undertaken. On November 26, 1851, the Real Compañía de Canalización of the Ebro was allowed to carry out the necessary work.

On July 18, 1857, the energy canal was officially opened.

=== Ebro Observatory ===
Founded by the Society of Jesus and initiated by the Jesuit Father Ricard Sirera. The closed opening of the Ebro Space Physics Observatory took place on September 8, 1904. And the public opening took place on August 30, 1905, which coincided with a total solar eclipse in the same year. In 1920, the head of the observatory was replaced by father Luis Rhodes, during this period important improvements were made to the premises, especially in the seismological sector.

With the dissolution of the Society of Jesus, the Board of Trustees of the Observatory became dependent on the diocese of Tortosa, which influenced the organization, activities of the center and the suppression of state aid. In May 1938, Father Anthony Roman y Puho, who had previously been deputy director, became the new head. During his tenure as director, the observatory expanded the scope of its science by improving equipment and adapting it to current needs.

On October 3, 1970, the patronage was transferred to Father Josep Oriol Cardus, and the observatory was divided into five departments: Heliophysics, Ionosphere, Geomagnetism, Meteorology and Seismology.

=== Minor seminary of Sant Josep ===
The Society of Jesus founded the first apostolic school in Gandia in 1906, attended by students from Valencia and Catalonia. In 1912, the Jesuits founded a second apostolic school in the province of Zaragoza, attended by students from Aragon and Catalonia.

The merger of both schools resulted in the Minor Seminary of San Jose, founded on November 23, 1916. Near the Ebro Observatory, where the philosophy department of the Society of Jesus was previously located.

In 1945 the center was transformed into a seminary college, thus receiving the name "Colegio PP Jesuitas".

The center continued its activities until the 1950s before its final closure.

Currently, the first floor of the building houses the Civic Center of the Municipality of Roquetes, and the second floor houses the Roquetes-Merce Lleixa Library.

=== The Municipal Market ===
The most important municipal building of the 19th century, together with the town hall. Located on Carrer Major street. Built in 1892 according to the decision of the mayor of the municipality - Joan Alegret Barber (1890-1893).

The market began to operate under the supervision of a tenant, a man to whom the city council rented out a service annually for a set amount, who cleaned the inside and outside of the building. At the beginning of the twentieth century, market services became dependent on the city council itself.

=== Municipal Slaughterhouse ===
Since 1921, a municipal massacre has been operating in Roquetes. The building was opened by order of the Mayor Josep Gisbert Barber (1920-1923) and continued its activities until the 1980s.

It is currently the administrative headquarters of the Parque Natural del Ports and the Park's Visitor Center at Baix Ebre.

== Economy ==
The traditional economic activity of the municipality was agriculture. In the plains at the foot of the ports, the main activity was dry farming (mainly olive, carob and almonds) on small household plots, which was introduced into the cultivation of orange trees, taking advantage of the exploitation of aquifers. Fruit trees (especially orange and tangerine), vegetables and rice are grown around the canal de la Dreta del Ebro. The construction of the canal has made fundamental changes in agriculture and the economy of this sector.

Electricity entered the municipality in 1911, which contributed to the diversity of the local industry.

In 1920, Roquetes had an important industrial sector: a sock factory, a wooden factory, a stone oil cooperative, a distillery and derivatives factory, and a soap factory.

The tertiary sector has little impact due to its proximity to the larger city, Tortosa.

== Education and culture ==
=== Education ===
With the proclamation of the Second Spanish Republic, a serious problem arose - the creation and construction of public schools.

In Roquetes, the role of teacher and politician Marcel Domingo, then Minister of Public Education, was decisive for the approval of the school's construction. On June 17, 1934, the "El Grup Escolar Marcel·lí Domingo" was inaugurated, named after him in gratitude.

There are currently two public primary education centers in Roquetes: Escola Mestre Marcel·lí Domingo de Roquetes and Escola de la Raval de Cristo. Apart from the center of secondary education, the Institut de Roquetes.

=== The Lyra ===
"Sociedad Recreativa y Musical la Lira", founded on June 24, 1907, by a group of farmers interested in popularizing popular culture and workers' associations.

Among the first remarkable and important actions of the association was the creation of a music school by teachers Joan Cid, Frederic Zaragoza and Mossen Josep Mirawals. As a result of this school, the Banda de Música de la Lira was created in 1924 under the direction of maestro Jaume Rovira. Later, Lyra had a choir directed by Joan Moreira and Ramos.

The organization has new cultural sections, as well as an elementary school and theater. In the latter, since 1918, there is a stage painting, which presents, among other things, traditional works such as Don Juan Tenorio or La Barraca de San Antonio.

At the end of the Civil War, the enterprise was closed with a subsequent cessation of activities. The building was run by the city council, and the theater was leased to film entrepreneurs under the name Cine Alcázar.

In 1967, Lyra opened its doors to continue its cultural activities.

From time to time, Lyra becomes the culmination of the cultural life of Roquetes.

== Holidays and traditions ==
=== Feast of St. Anthony the Abbot (January 17) ===
The Feast of St. Anthony begins with Mass, followed by the blessing of the animals and a procession through the village of Roquetes on horseback and mules. Then horse races along the Roquetes-Jesus road. In the afternoon, in front of the church, a dance with the performance of "Canalero" and his fables. Around 1932, the performances of the Barraca de San Antonio started. Over time, the interpretation of the play was abandoned, and it was reinstated in 2012 with adaptation and production by Tony Vives.

Today, Mass celebrations, horse parades and animal blessings continue on the Roquetes-Jesus road.

=== Main holiday (July) ===
In Roquetes, the main holidays are celebrated in the first week of July - the feast of Sant Gregori d'Estia, the patron saint of the city.

Coincides with the first Monday in July, a local holiday.

=== Traditional Festival (August) ===
The last week of August marks the Tradicionàrius de les Terres de l'Ebre, the most important folklore festival in which you can enjoy live music with major bands from all Catalan countries and events related to popular culture.

=== "Canalero and his fable" ===
Another deeply rooted tradition is Rondalla, around girls, authorities, and anyone who asked for it. The main figure was the singer. The songs that are sung are always improvised, of four verses and the last two repeating.

The most famous singer of Ruketas was Josep García Sanz, known as "Lo Canalero". He was accompanied on guitar by Ramon Tafalla, Juanito Valmagna and Joanet de Guéc.

Josep García Sans "Lo Canalero" was born in Roquetes on August 4, 1914. The nickname Canalero received from his maternal grandfather, he once supervised work on the Dretat de l'Ebre canal. the work was completed and he remained the caretaker of the Xertus Canal to Amposta.

His performances were unprepared, he said: "The grace of the sung Tortosa jota is an improvisation, and the sooner you think about it and say what you want to say, the better."

Characteristic features were shots of six verses and a signal to the musicians to stop the music.

He died on June 26, 2004.

== Gastronomy ==
The richness of Roquetens' cuisine extends from the heights of the ports to the Ebro Delta.

But if there are any desserts typical for this municipality, then these are the so-called Punyetes de Roquetes. The composition includes: flour, sugar, mistela, butter, milk, eggs, lime, almonds and anise.

On July 1, 1990, by popular vote, this pasta was chosen as typical. Lo Canalero sang it like this:

"-When people eat

"these" pastas are so well cooked

many will ask in which village they are made

and who knows will answer

they are Punyetes de Roquetes."

Other typical and important desserts are the so-called panoli, also known as cakes. Pasta of Arabic origin, round and very thin, composed of flour, oil, water and matafaluga.

== Architectural structures ==
=== Parish church ===
Dedicated to Saint Anthony of Padua. Built in 1823. The area on the site is nine hundred and thirty-six square meters and is made in a neoclassical style. Consists of one rectangular nave and a polygonal apse.

The central nave is surrounded by buttresses connected by arches that expand the main space; we find, modeling, two side naves, which are in fact another space of the central nave. Using these spaces, there are three side altars in each false nave.

A simple vaulted transept and the ribs of the apse converged at the highest point of the dome.

In the 19th century, there were no pictorial motives, but by the 20th century, religious motives appeared.

The bell tower is square in plan. Four bells crown it with its own name, bell and a different orientation: Antonia Victoria faces the main entrance to Roquetes, Gregorian Josephine faces the city of Jesus, San Josep faces Carrer de la Gaia, and the smaller one faces Pou.

=== Old town hall ===
The first stone was laid on April 19, 1880, and the building itself was inaugurated in 1881 by the mayor Francesco Fonollosa and Hierro. This fulfilled one of the wishes of the population - to build a building that would also serve as a school and housing for teachers.

Later it was converted into premises for the courtyard on the ground floor and for the town hall on the second floor.

Located on Canal Street.

Currently, the first floor of the building houses the Primary Health Care Center (CAP), the ground floor houses the Youth Center and Television Center, and the second and third floors houses the Roquetes Museum Center for Interpretation.

=== Municipal market ===
Located on the main street.

The most important building of the 19th century after the Town Hall.

Built in 1892 by the mayor Joan Alegret y Barbera (1890–1893). He achieved the transfer of land by its owner, Alonso Ballester.

The area is six hundred and fifty-five square meters.

=== Municipal abattoir ===
The building, designed by an unknown architect, dates back to 1922, a novosentist building built on a rectangular plot overlooking four streets. Consists of three rectangular U-shaped naves with the main exit to the courtyard, which remains in the middle of the building. The pilasters, topped with a round, circular dot in the middle, are repeated around the perimeter of the building and protrude from the cornice. The roofs are peaked on the sides and peaked in the middle.

It has always functioned as an abattoir, except during the Civil War, when it was used for military service.

After many years of neglect and restoration, today it functions as the Visitor Center and Administrative Headquarters of the Del Ports Natural Park.

Raval Nova

The Raval Nova urbanization project was carried out by master Josep Battet. The triangular shape of the site has determined the process of urbanization. There was enough space left in the center of the site to build a large quadrangular square, which was exceptional at the time. Very jagged long paths intersect perpendicularly with High Street.

=== Raval de Cristo ===
Later in origin than Ruketas, but similar settlement process. The first mention of the geographical name dates back to 1860, in the nomenclature of the province of Tarragona, a group of 48 famous houses called "Casas de Cristo" is included as a suburb of Roquetes.

It is also planned to leave a large area in the center of the development, on which a church of more than 800 square meters will be built.

=== Raval de Merce ===
The origin of the suburb, as well as the name, can be found in buildings built between 1843 and 1855 by Felip Merce and Balaguer, master of the fortification construction in Tortosa.

In 1855, Ignasi Chavalera, a lawyer from the town of Alcanar, began selling a six or seven day estate belonging to his wife and daughter-in-law.

A special feature of this initiative was that it is the first area in which the Roquetes City Council exercises its urban planning powers. Another feature was that he transformed the suburb of Merce from a small group of houses into an urbanized area.
