= Roques de Benet =

Mountain in Catalonia, Spain

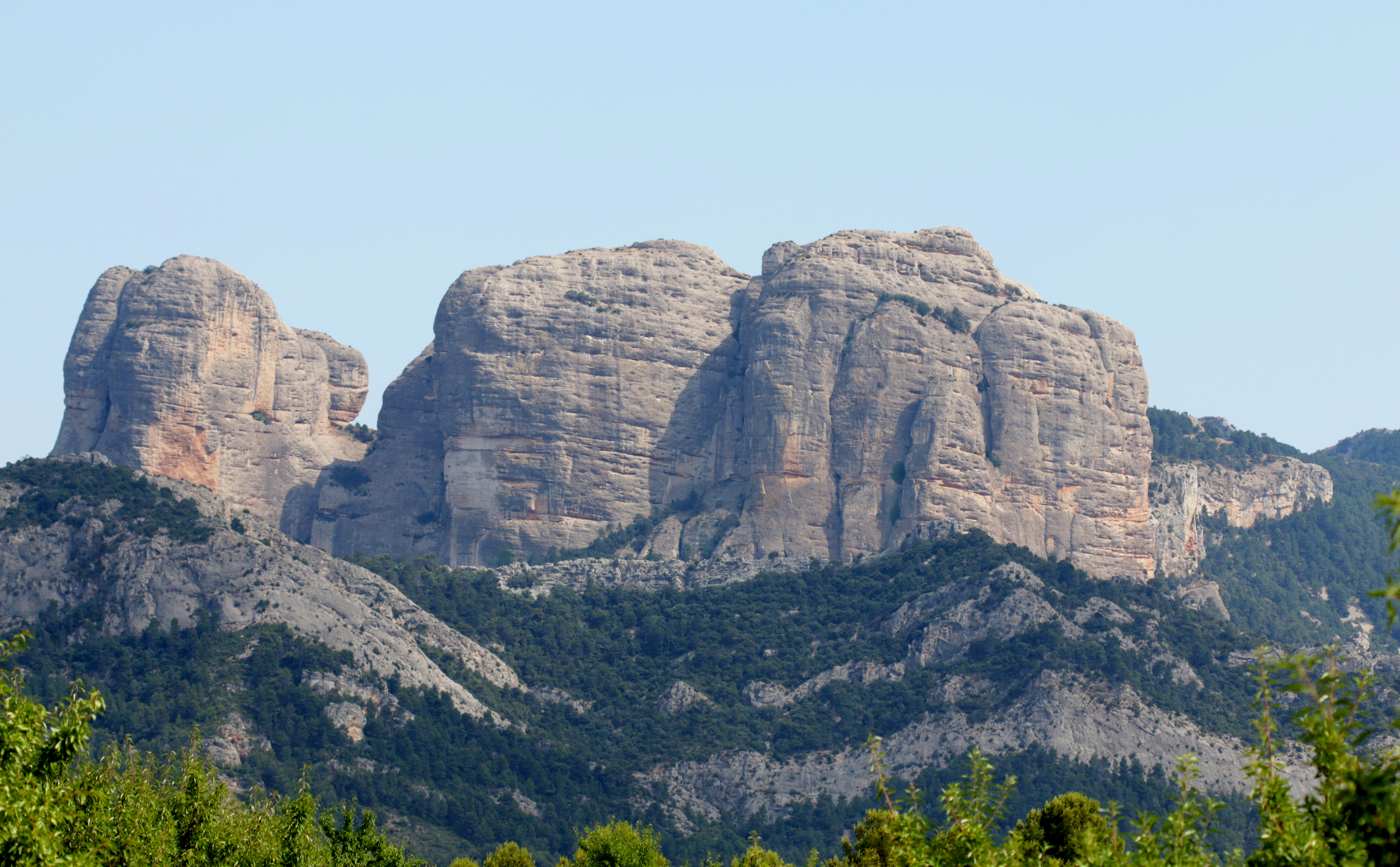

Highest point
- Elevation: 1,017.1 m (3,337 ft)
- Listing: Mountains of Catalonia
- Coordinates: 40°54′04″N 00°19′36.2″E

Geography
- Location within Catalonia
- Location: Terra Alta, Catalonia
- Parent range: Ports de Tortosa-Beseit

Geology
- Mountain type: Limestone

Climbing
- Easiest route: Drive from Horta de Sant Joan or Arnes

Roques de Benet is a compact group of sheer rocky outcrops in the northwestern side of the Ports de Tortosa-Beseit, Catalonia, Spain. The highest summit (el Castell) has an elevation of 1,017.1 metres above sea level.

The Roques de Benet are one of the Emblematic summits of Catalonia.

== See also ==
- Ports de Tortosa-Beseit
- Iberian System
