= Castell de l'Airosa =

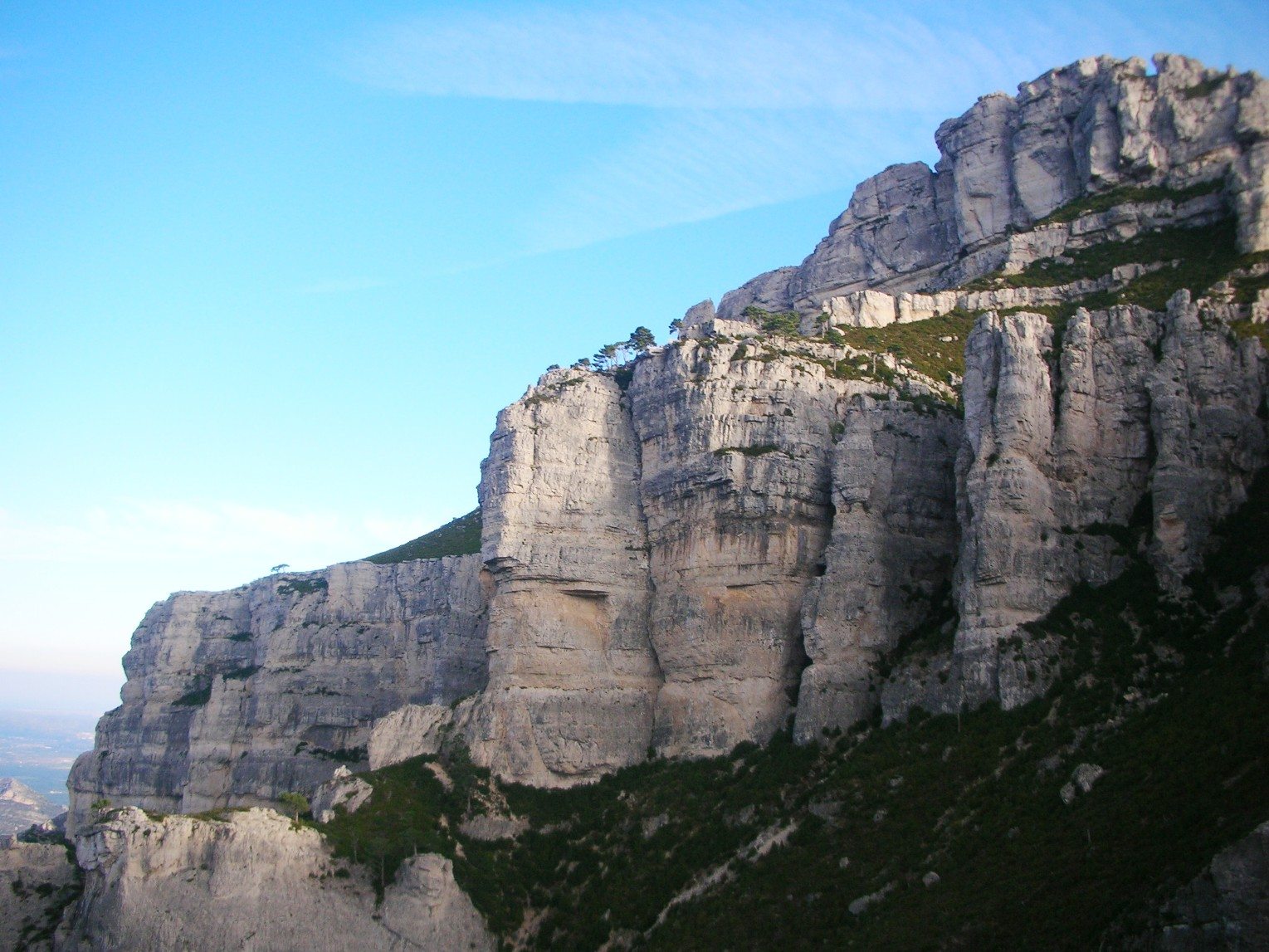
- View of the massive NW face of the Castell de l'Airosa.

Highest point
- Elevation: 953.8 m (3,129 ft)
- Coordinates: 40°45′42.4″N 00°20′12″E

Geography
- Location within Catalonia
- Location: Baix Ebre, Catalonia
- Parent range: Ports de Tortosa-Beseit

Geology
- Mountain type: Limestone

Climbing
- Easiest route: Hike from Roquetes

Castell de l'Airosa is a rocky mountain in the eastern side of the Ports de Tortosa-Beseit, Catalonia, Spain. Its summit has an altitude of 953.8 metres above sea level.

Castell de l'Airosa, is a spectacular looking mountain. Its name includes the term castell —"castle" in Catalan— for the mountain looks very much like a castle when viewed from certain angles.

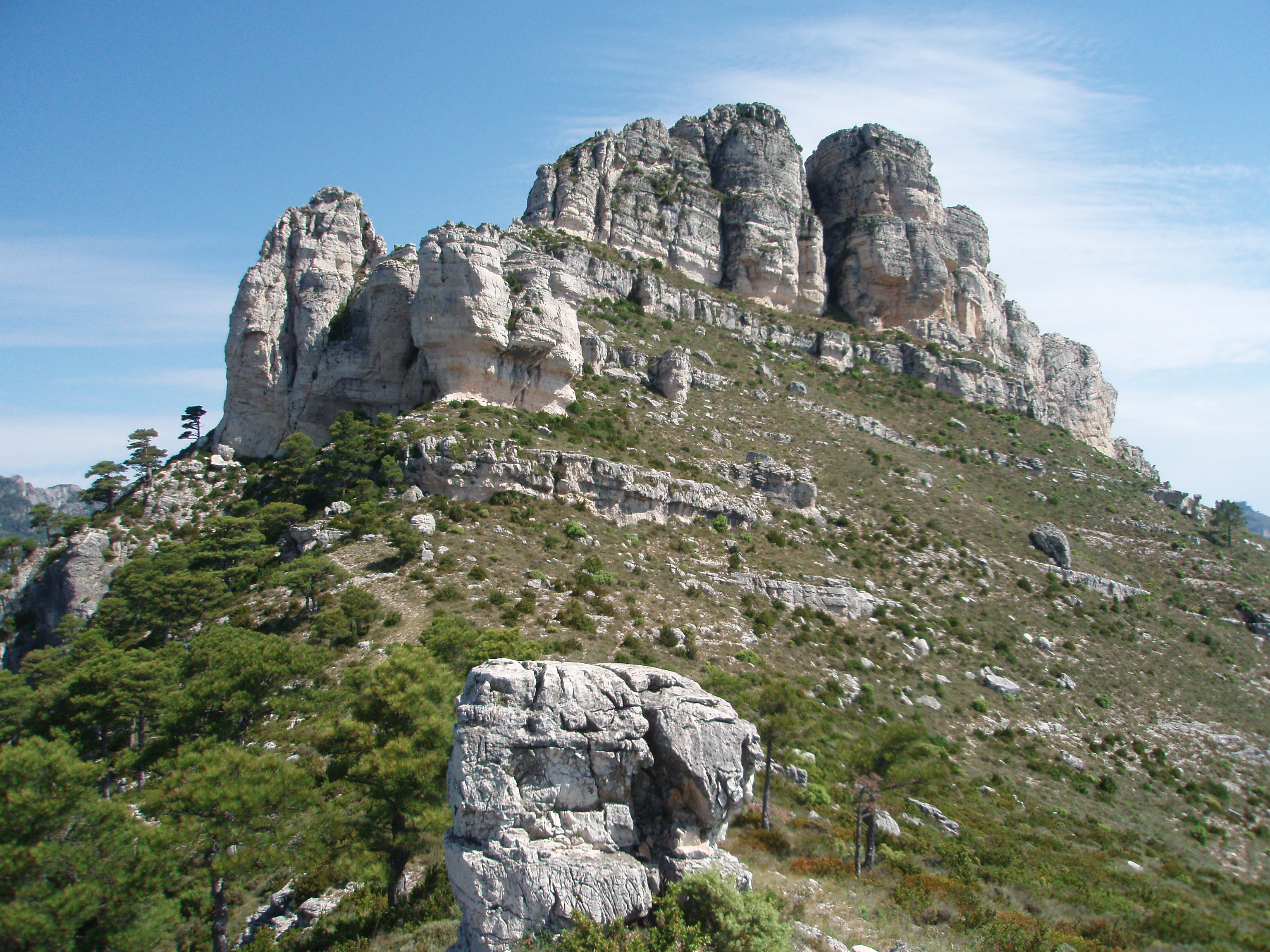
Castell de l'Airosa; eastern face.

== See also ==
- Ports de Tortosa-Beseit
- Mountains of Catalonia
- Iberian System
