= Muntanya de Santa Bàrbara =

Mountain in northeast Spain

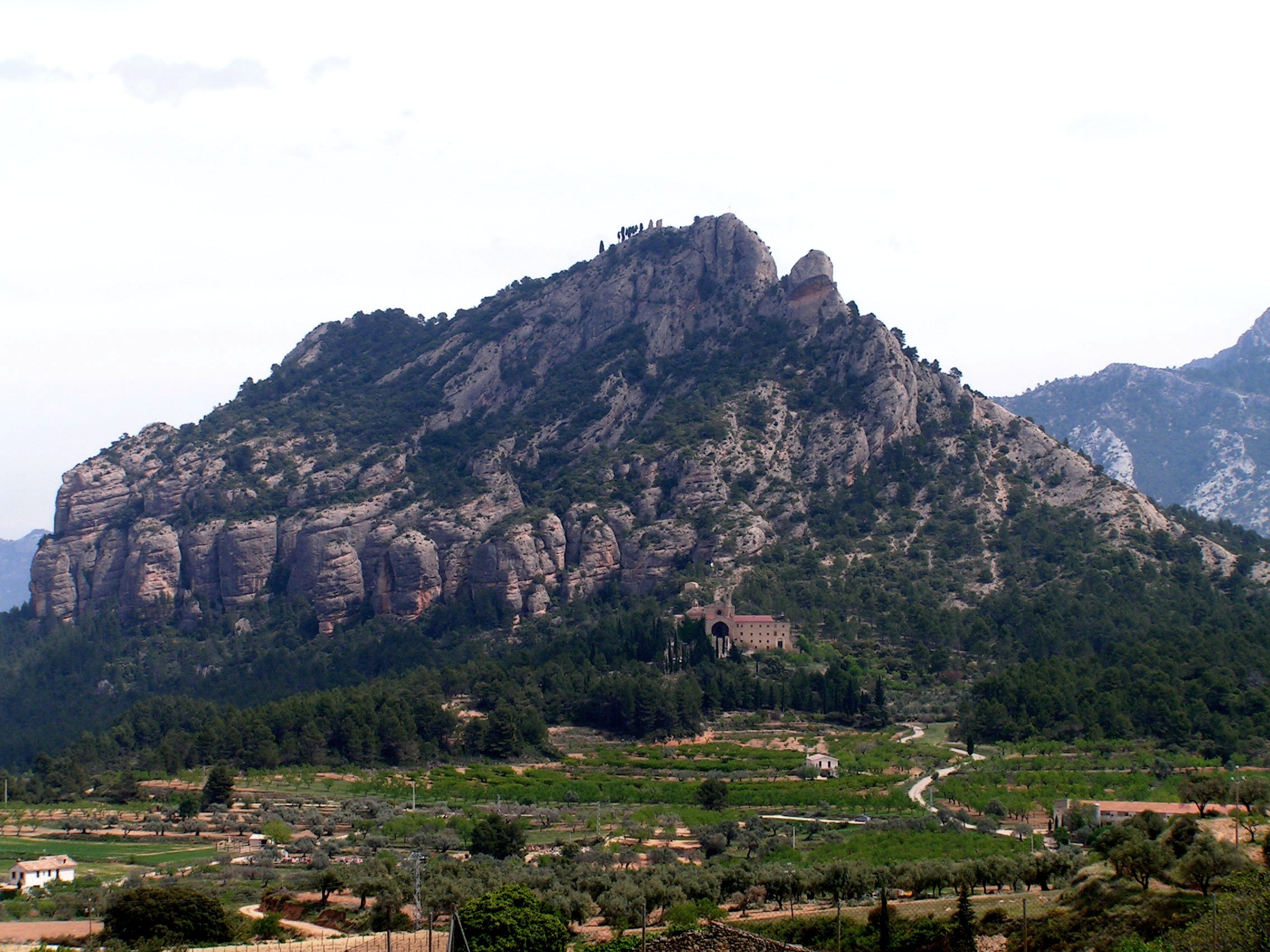

Highest point
- Elevation: 751 m (2,464 ft)
- Coordinates: 40°57′24″N 00°20′17″E

Geography
- Location within Catalonia
- Location: Terra Alta, Catalonia
- Parent range: Ports de Tortosa-Beseit

Geology
- Mountain type: Karstic

Climbing
- Easiest route: Hike from Horta de Sant Joan

Muntanya de Santa Bàrbara is a mountain that is part of the northwestern foothills of the Ports de Tortosa-Beseit, Catalonia, Spain. It has an elevation of 751.3 metres (2,465 ft) above sea level.

The Sant Salvador d'Horta monastery, also known as Convent dels Àngels, is located at the foot of this mountain.

This mountain is one of the Emblematic summits of Catalonia.

== See also ==
- Ports de Tortosa-Beseit
- Mountains of Catalonia
- Iberian System
