= Serra de l'Espina =

Limestone mountain chain located at the north-eastern end of the Iberian system

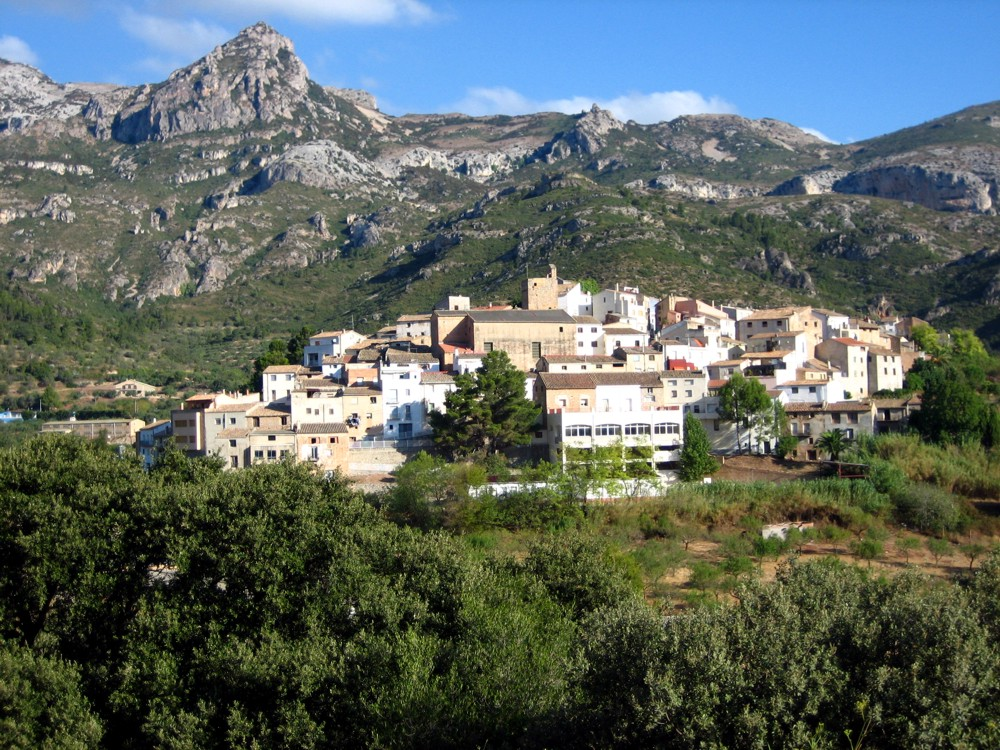
- Serra de l'Espina rising above Alfara de Carles

Highest point
- Peak: L'Espina
- Elevation: 1,181.6 m (3,877 ft)
- Coordinates: 40°52′46.73″N 0°21′43.93″E

Geography
- Location within Catalonia
- Location: Baix Ebre
- Parent range: Ports de Tortosa-Beseit

Geology
- Orogeny: Alpine orogeny
- Rock type: Karstic

Climbing
- Easiest route: Walk from Alfara de Carles

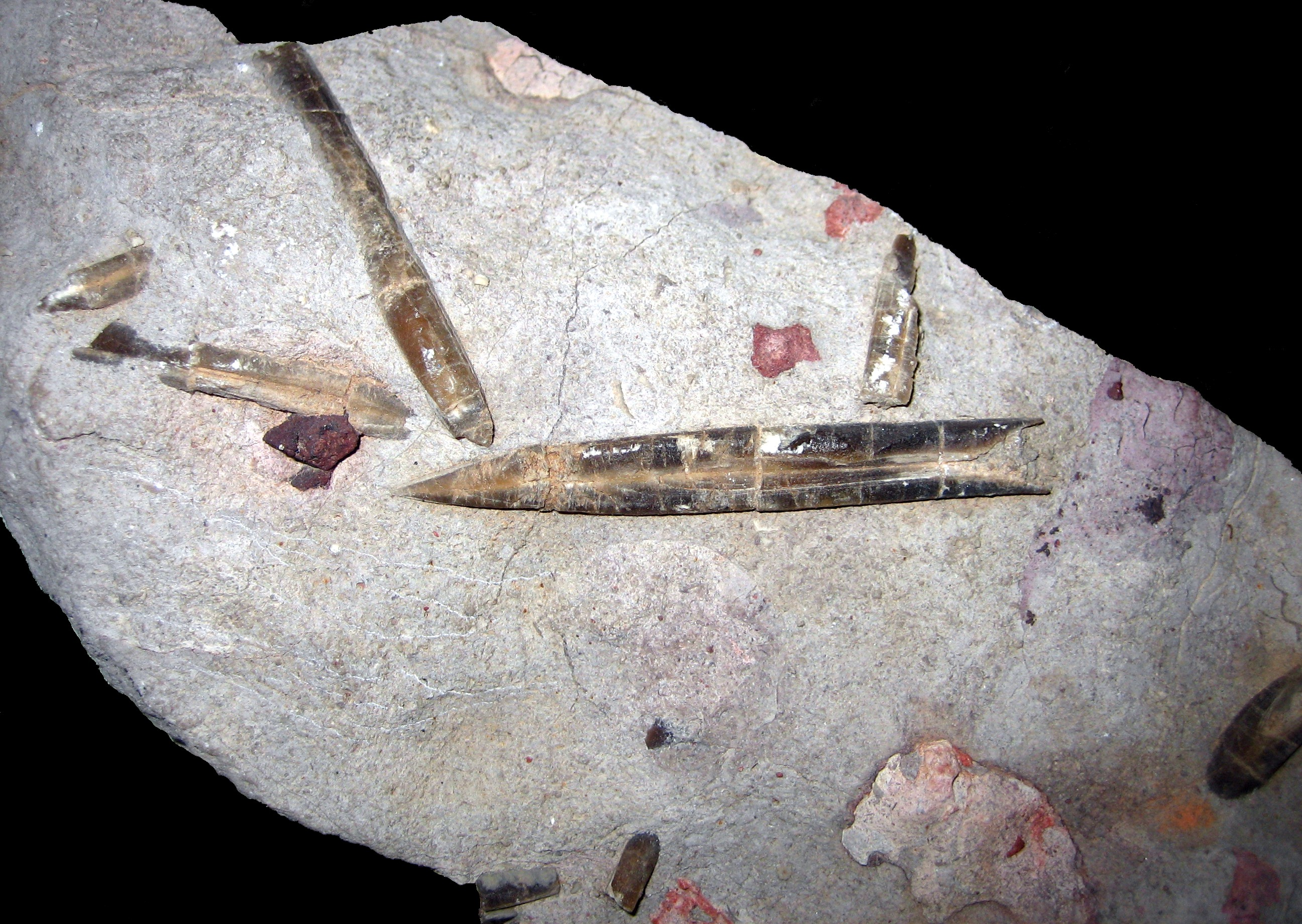
Belemnites fossils from l'Alfara de Carles mountain area.

Serra de l'Espina is a limestone mountain chain located at the north-eastern end of the Iberian System. It connects the Ports de Tortosa-Beseit mountain massif with the Catalan Pre-Coastal Range.

== Geography ==
The Serra de l'Espina ridge's highest point is L'Espina (1,181.6 m). Other high peaks are Mola Carrascosa (1.025 m), Cap de la Faixa Blanca (1.023 m), Tossal de Montclí (960 m) and La Moleta d'Alfara (812 m).

On the eastern side of the range are some visible barren patches, devoid of vegetation owing to high winds, the very large Rases del Maraco, or Les Rases, at the southern end and Erms de Canduca further north. Other noteworthy places are Solana de les Feixes, the Cova dels Adells karstic cave and the ruins of Mas del Roig, an ancient farmhouse.

The Serra de Paüls mountain range is located to the north of this range.

=== Features ===
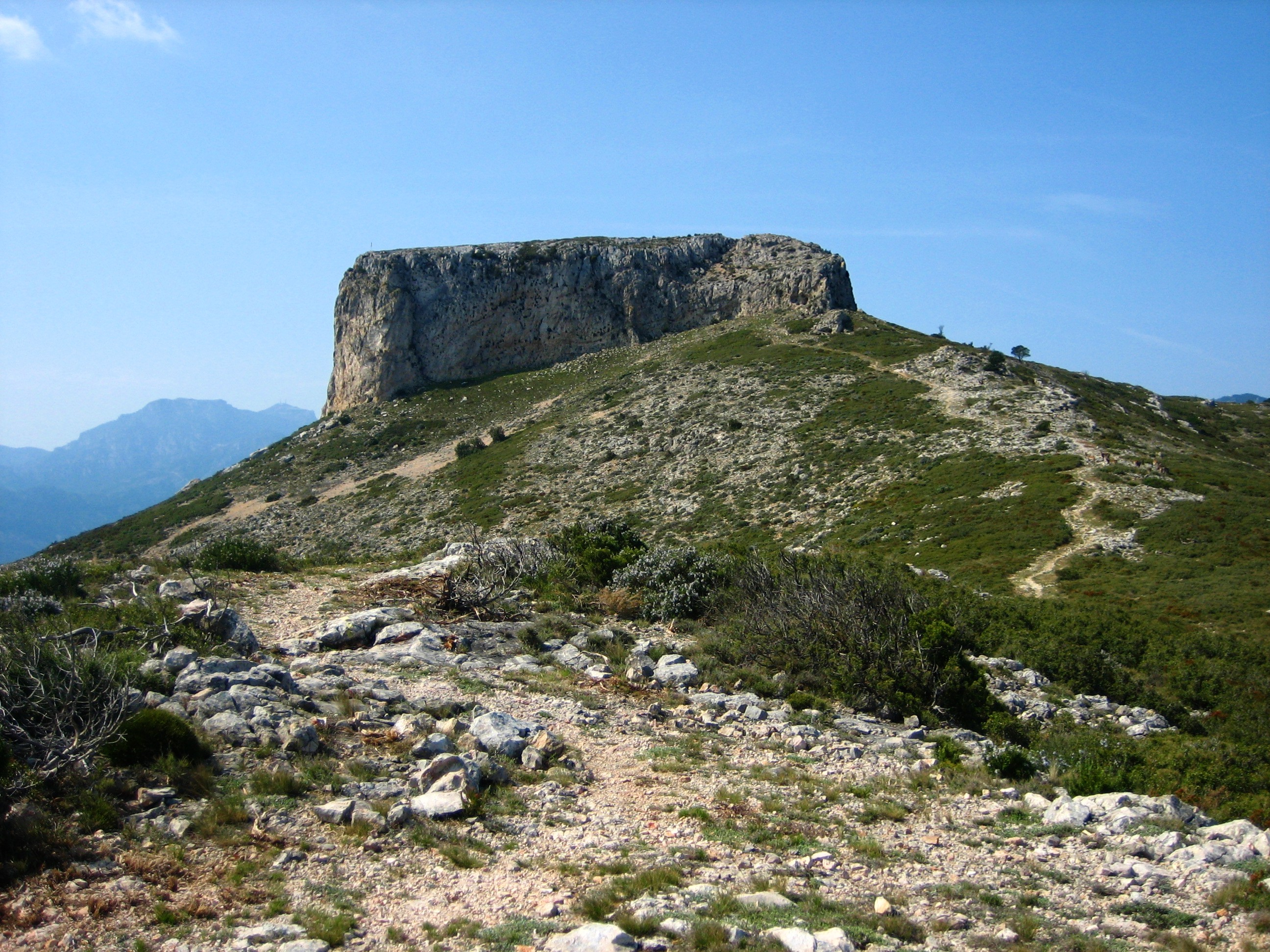
View of strikingly-shaped La Moleta

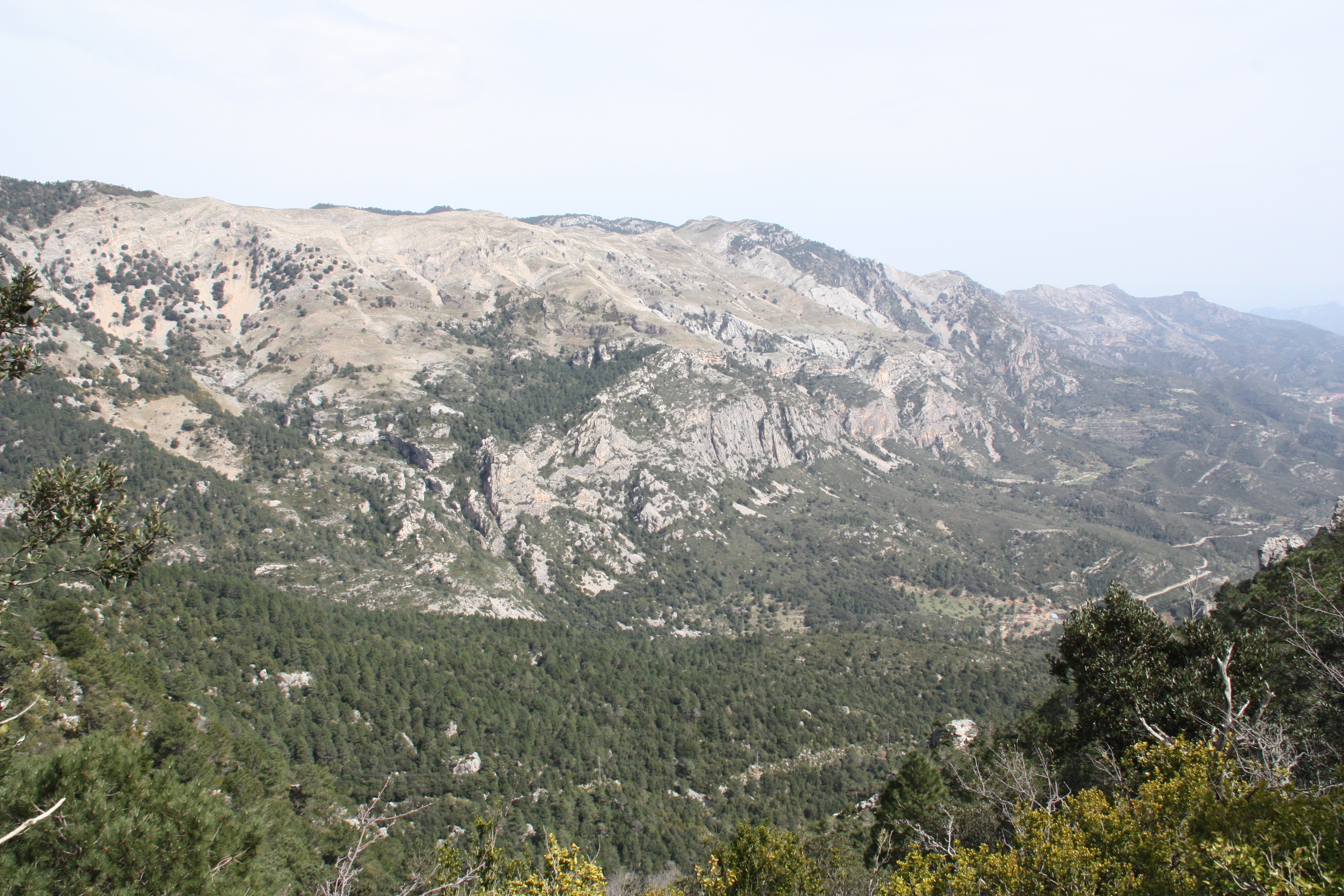
The barren Rases del Maraco
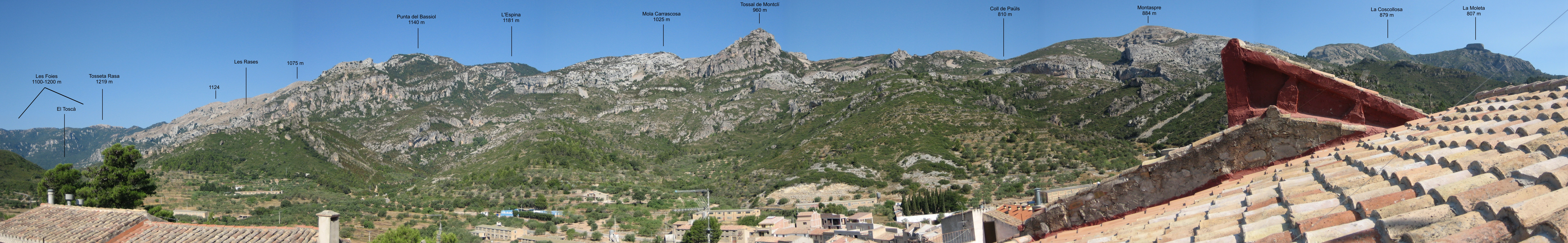
Serra de l'Espina viewed from Alfara de Carles

== See also ==
- La Moleta (Alfara de Carles)
- Ports de Tortosa-Beseit
- Catalan Pre-Coastal Range
- Iberian System
