= Ports de Tortosa-Beseit =

Mountain massif in Spain

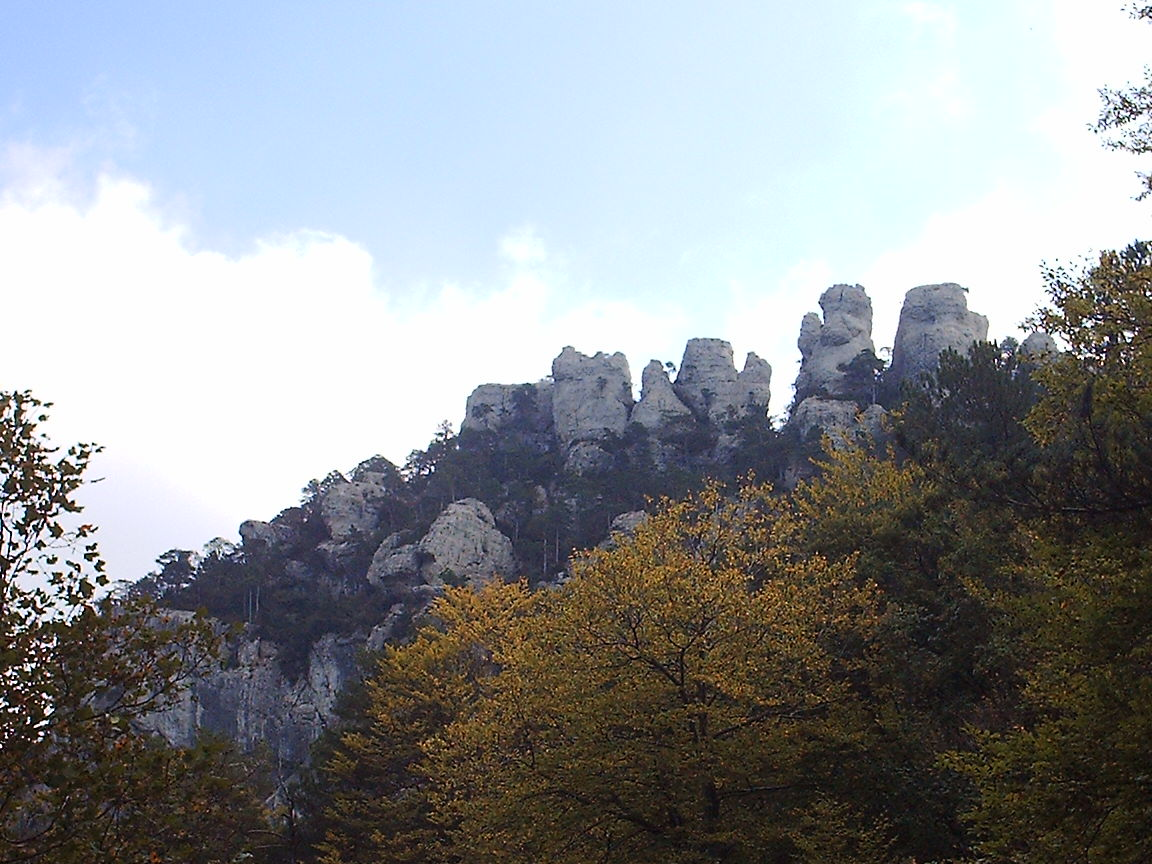
- Rocky outcrops at Els Ports

Highest point
- Peak: Mont Caro
- Elevation: 1,441 m (4,728 ft)
- Listing: List of mountains in Aragon
- Coordinates: 40°48′28″N 0°19′07″E

Geography
- Location within Spain
- Country: Spain
- Communities: Aragon, Catalonia and Valencia
- Comarca: Matarranya, Baix Ebre, Montsià and Baix Maestrat
- Parent range: Iberian System, eastern zone

Geology
- Orogeny: Alpine orogeny
- Rock age: Cretaceous
- Rock type: Karstic

Climbing
- Easiest route: Drive from Roquetes on the western side or from Beseit on the eastern

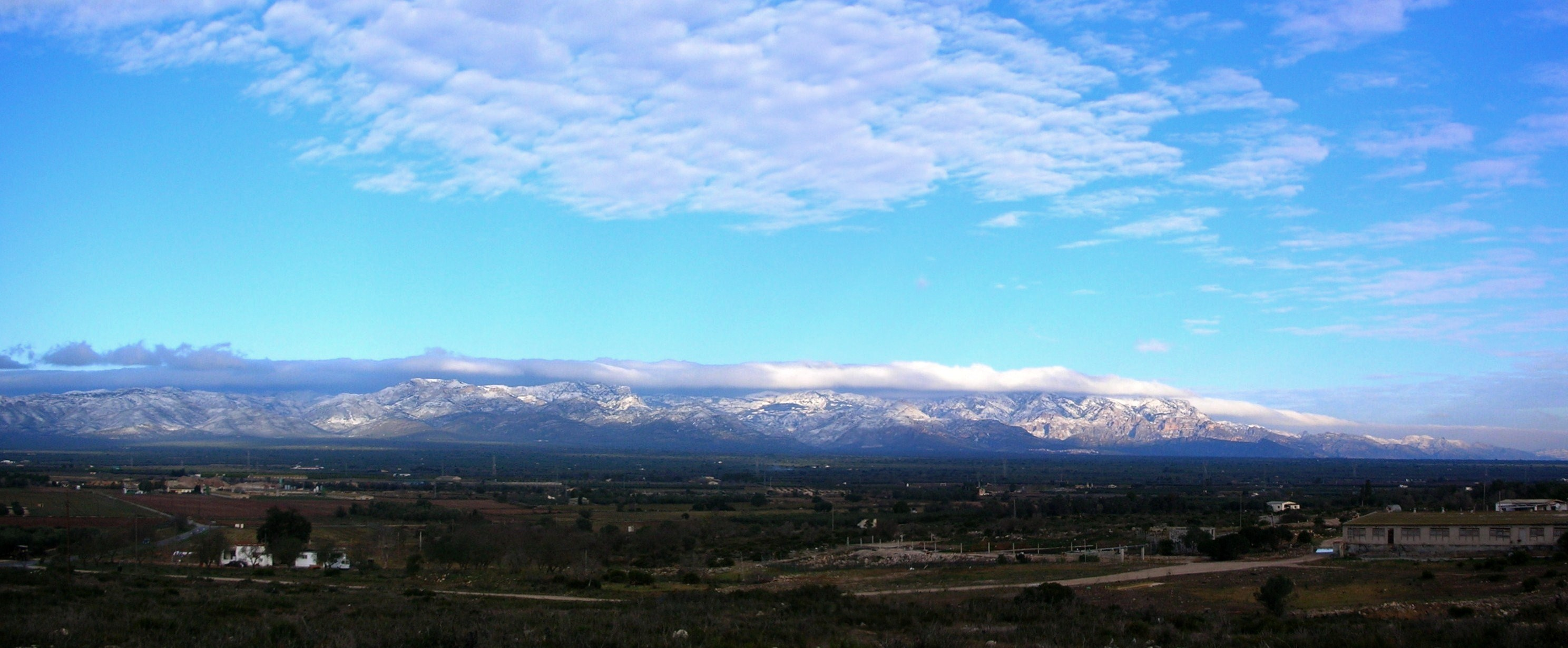
Els Ports under snow in the winter

Ports de Tortosa-Beseit (Catalan pronunciation: [ˈpɔɾdz ðə tuɾˈtozə βəˈzejt]), also known as Ports de Beseit, or simply as Els Ports [əls ˈpɔɾts] or Lo Port [lu ˈpɔɾt] by locals, is a limestone mountain massif located at the north-eastern end of the Sistema Ibérico, a complex system of mountain ranges and massifs in the centre of the Iberian Peninsula. Its highest point is Mont Caro, 1,441 m. Rivers such as the Matarranya and the Cenia have their source in these mountains.

== Description ==
At the 1350 m high Tossal dels Tres Reis (Peak of the Three Kings), where the borders of the ancient Kingdoms of Valencia, Catalonia and Aragon meet, there is a cairn marking the meeting point of the ancient three kingdoms of the Crown of Aragon.

It is mostly a limestone massif, with many steep cliffs, jagged peaks, deep valleys, shafts and caves. The area is mostly uninhabited except for small villages. These mountains were one of the last redoubts of the Spanish Maquis in the 1940s and 50s.

== Ecology ==
One of the largest colonies of griffon vultures in Europe, as well as Spanish Ibex, Roe Deer, Wild Boar, European badgers, common genets, grey wagtails, among others, have their habitat in these lonely mountains. Among the aquatic animals there are trout in some of the rivers and amphibians such as the Marbled newt in many of the ponds of the range.

The vegetation of the Ports is rich and varied. Besides the Mediterranean species, there are also species belonging to Alpine flora and colder temperate regions at high altitudes and in protected valleys.

== Mountain ranges ==
The Ports Massif comprises several mountain ranges, like the Muntanyes de Benifassà, Serra de les Falconeres, Serra del Àguila, Serra de Rastell, Los Curullons, Moles de Raudorar, Serra de la Fortalesa, Serra de Caro, Serra de la Puca, Serra de Rafalgari, Serra de Paüls, Serra de les Deveres, Serra de l'Escaleta, Serra d'Encanader, Serra del Pedregal, Serra del Coc and Serra de l'Espina. The latter, located at its northern end, connects with the Catalan Pre-Coastal Range.

== Peaks ==
Some of the main peaks of the massif are: Mont Caro (1441 m), the highest point, Castell de l'Airosa, Tossal d'en Cervera, Mola del Boix, Mola del Boixet, el Castellar, la Portella del Pinell, Curullons, el Negrell, Punta de l'Àliga, Farrubio, Penyaflor, Mola de Catí, Tossal dels Tres Reis, Tossa Blanca, Roques de Benet, Penyagalera, Mola de Lino, Tossal de Tall Nou, Tossal de l'Espada, la Ballestera, Mola de la Paridora, Muntanyola, La Tossa, Mola Castellona, Tossal de Joan Gran, Tossal de la Forca, Tossal d'en Grillo, Muntanya de Santa Bàrbara, L'Espina and La Moleta d'Alfara.

== Protected areas ==
There are two natural parks in the massif; there is no protected area on the Aragonese side:

- Parc Natural dels Ports on the Catalan side
- Parc Natural de la Tinença de Benifassà on the Valencian side.

== See also ==
- Beseit
- Matarraña/Matarranya
- Tinença de Benifassà
- List of mountains in Aragon
- List of mountains in the Valencian Community
- List of mountains in Catalonia

== Features ==
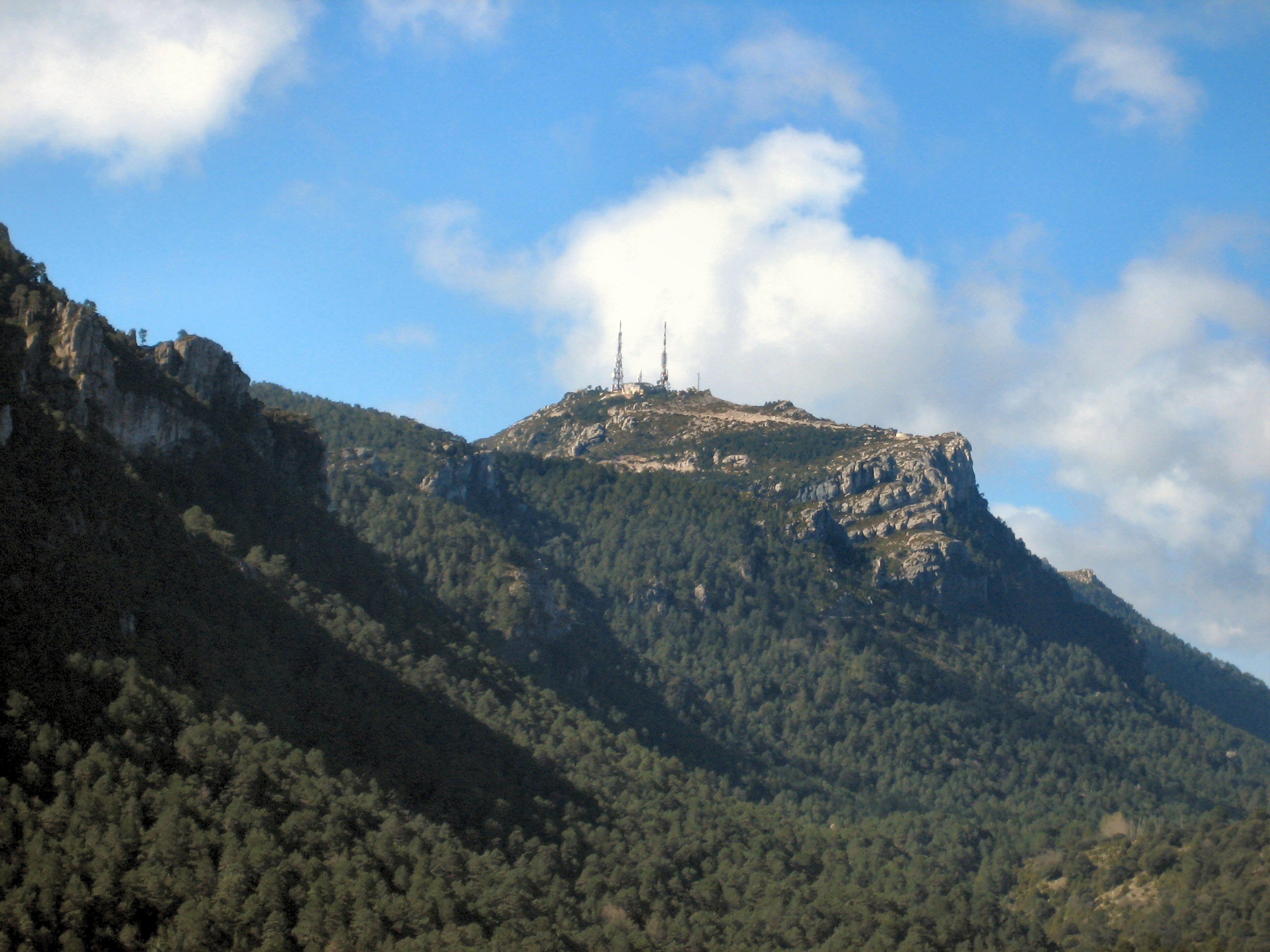
Mont Caro, the Ports' highest point

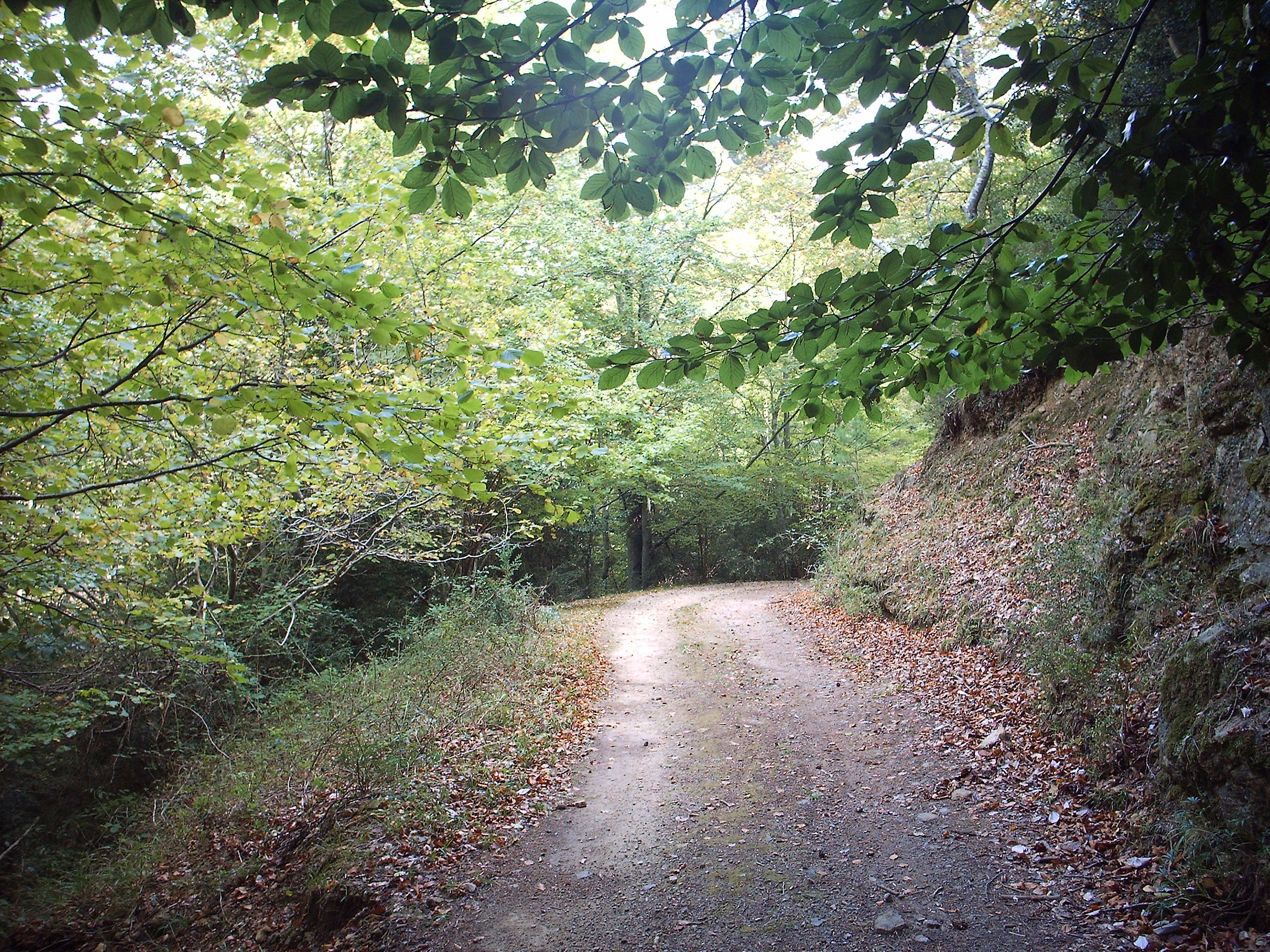
Beech forest in the National Park area

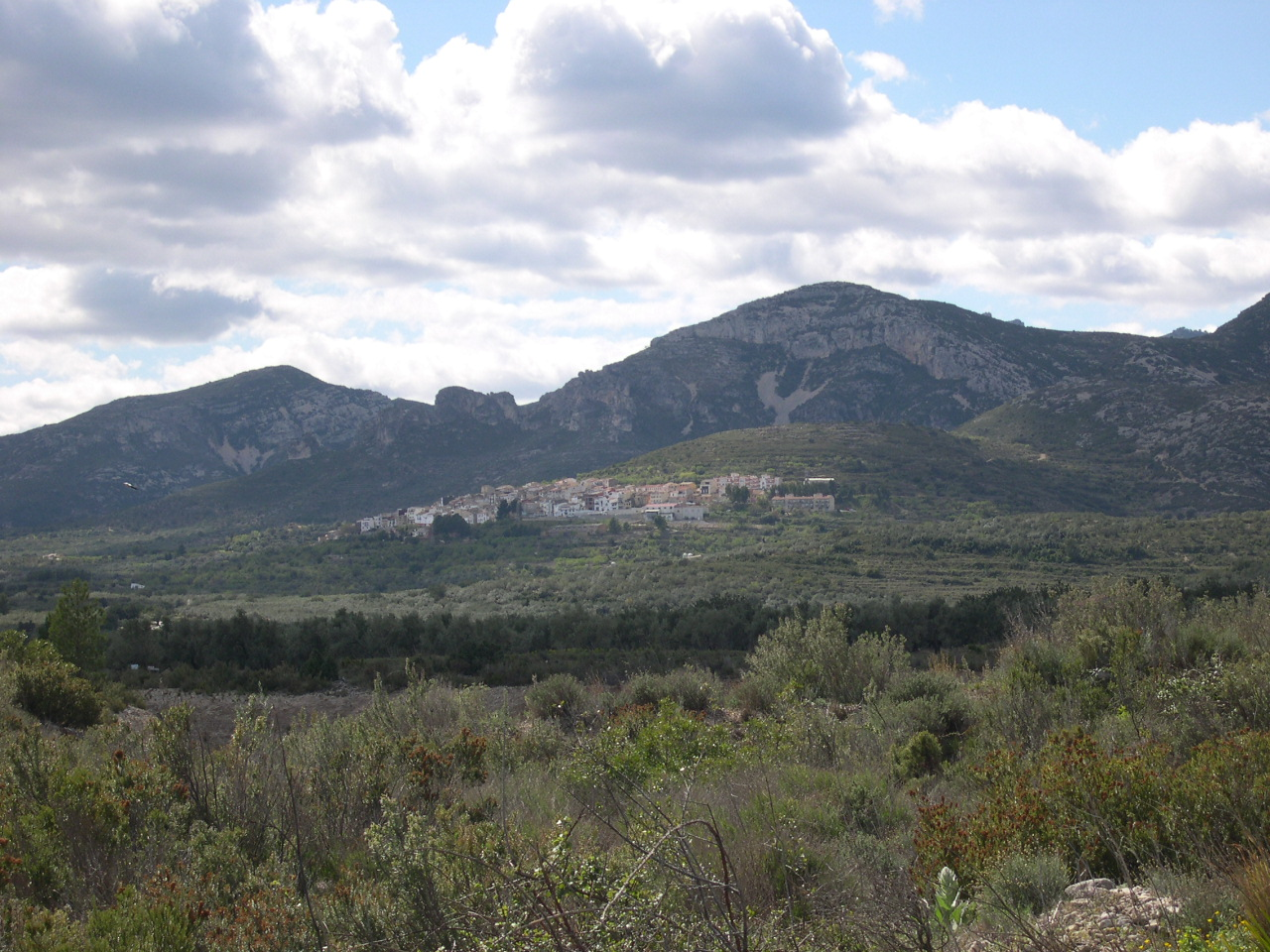
Mas de Barberans, a town located at the feet of the eastern edge of the Ports

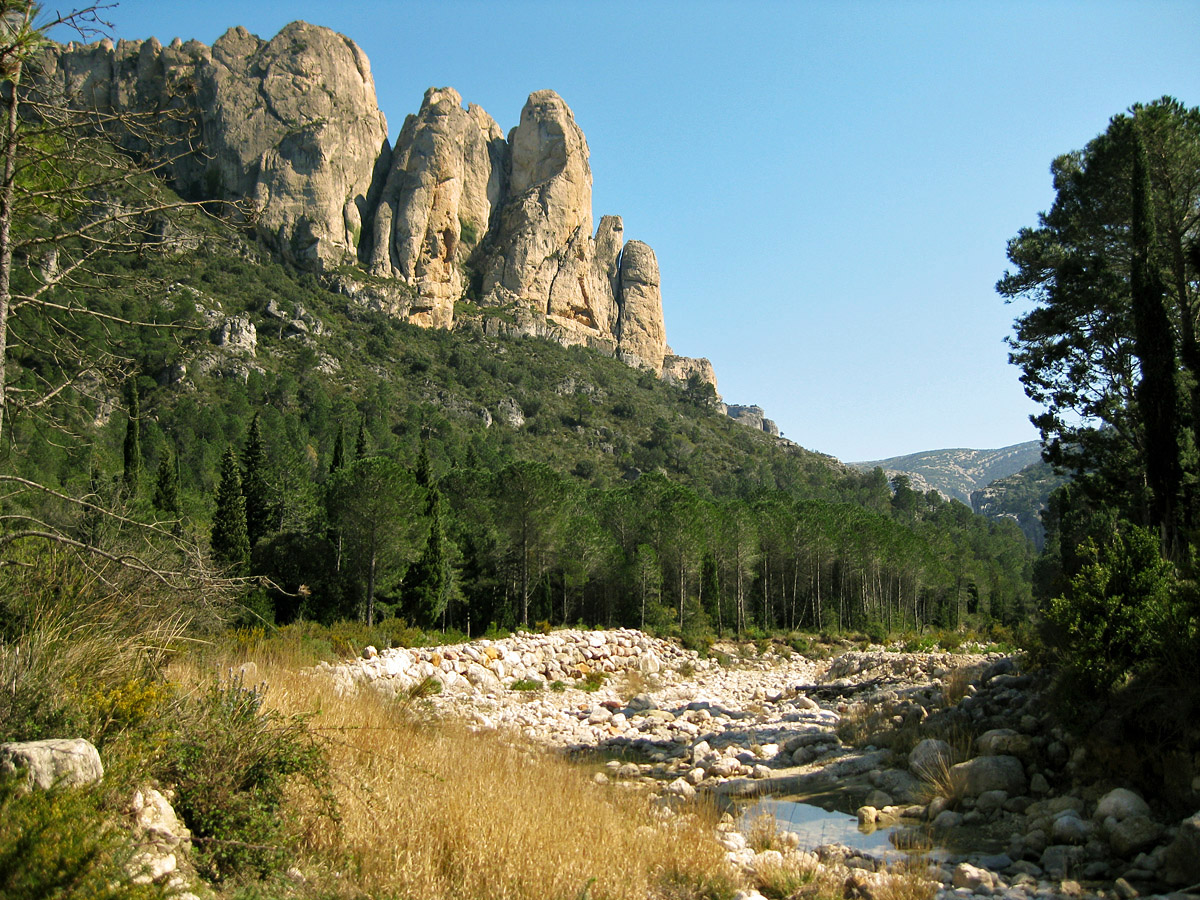
A mountain river at La Vall in the Mas de Barberans administrative area

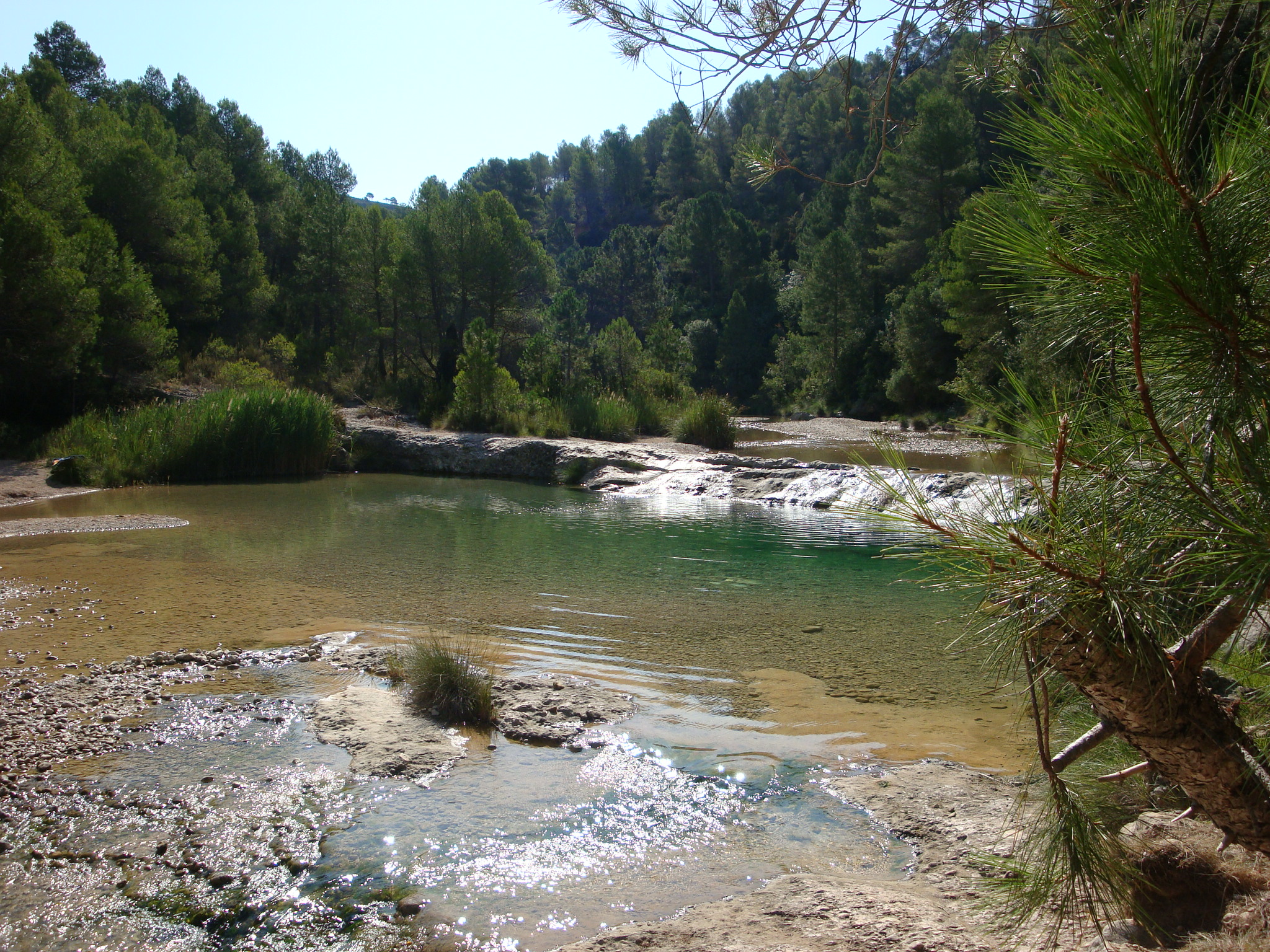
Ulldemó River close to Beseit on the western edge of the Ports

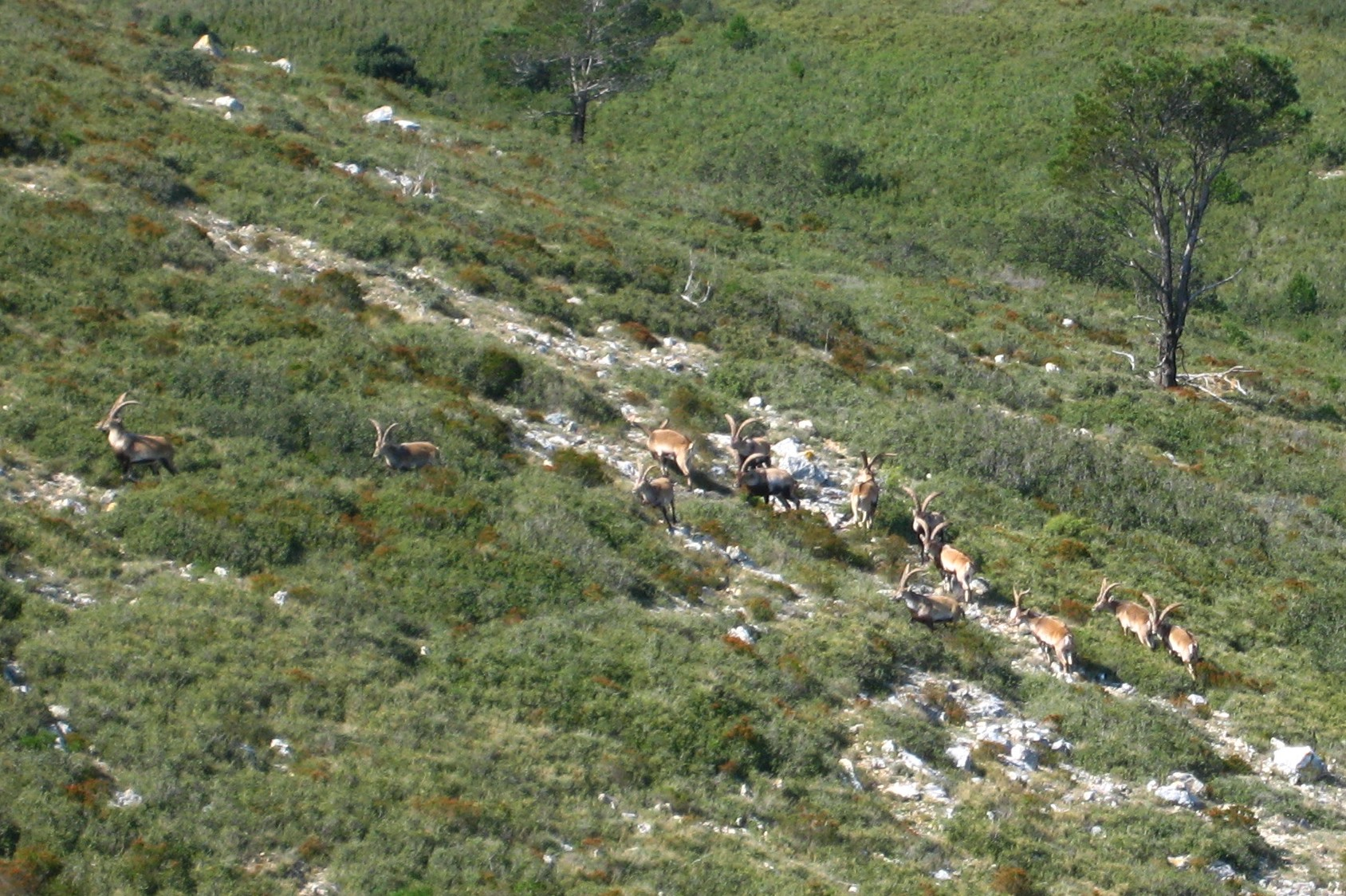
Spanish Ibex at Ports de Tortosa Beseit

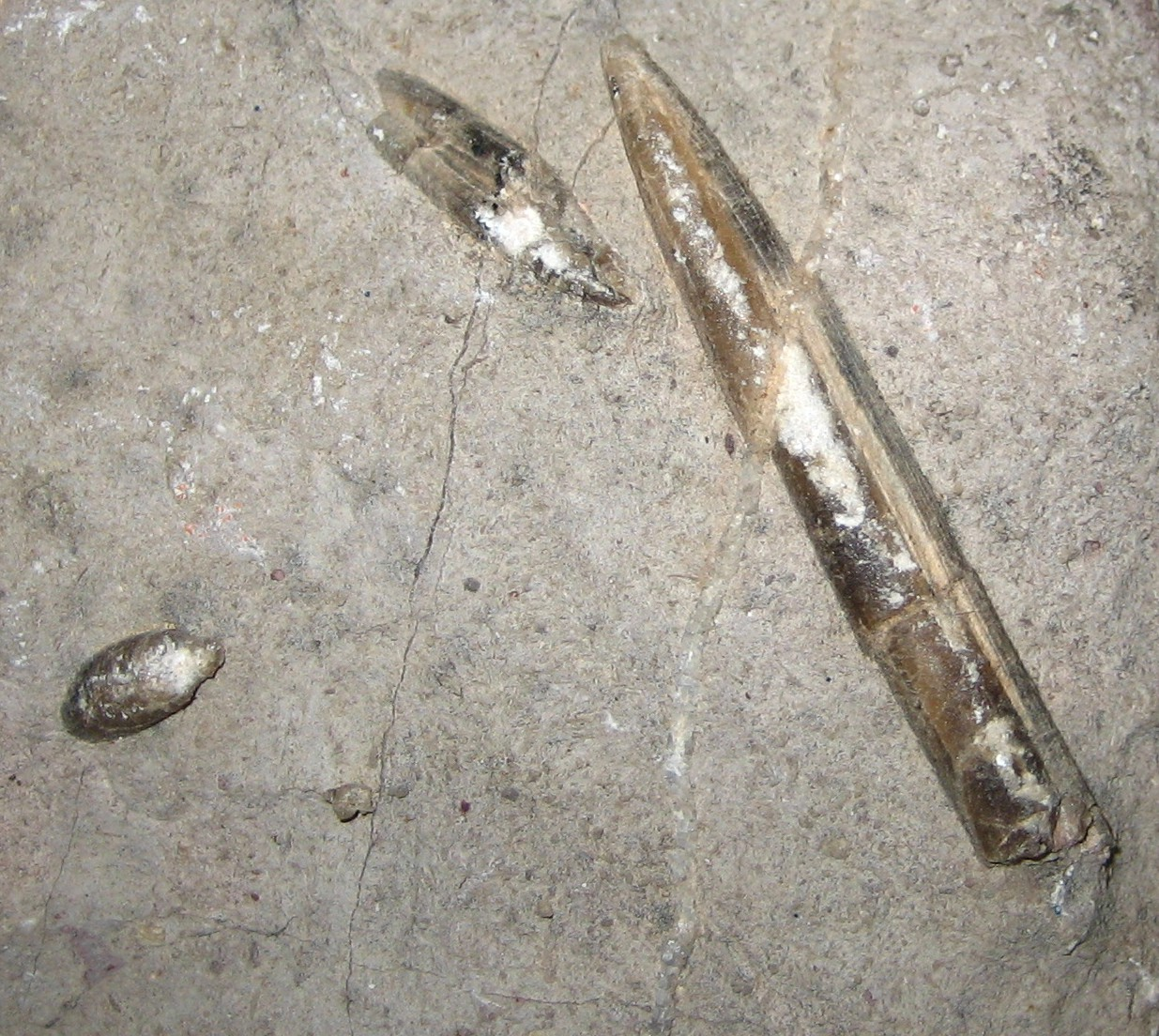
Belemnites fossils from Les Foies, in the Serra de l'Espina close to Alfara de Carles

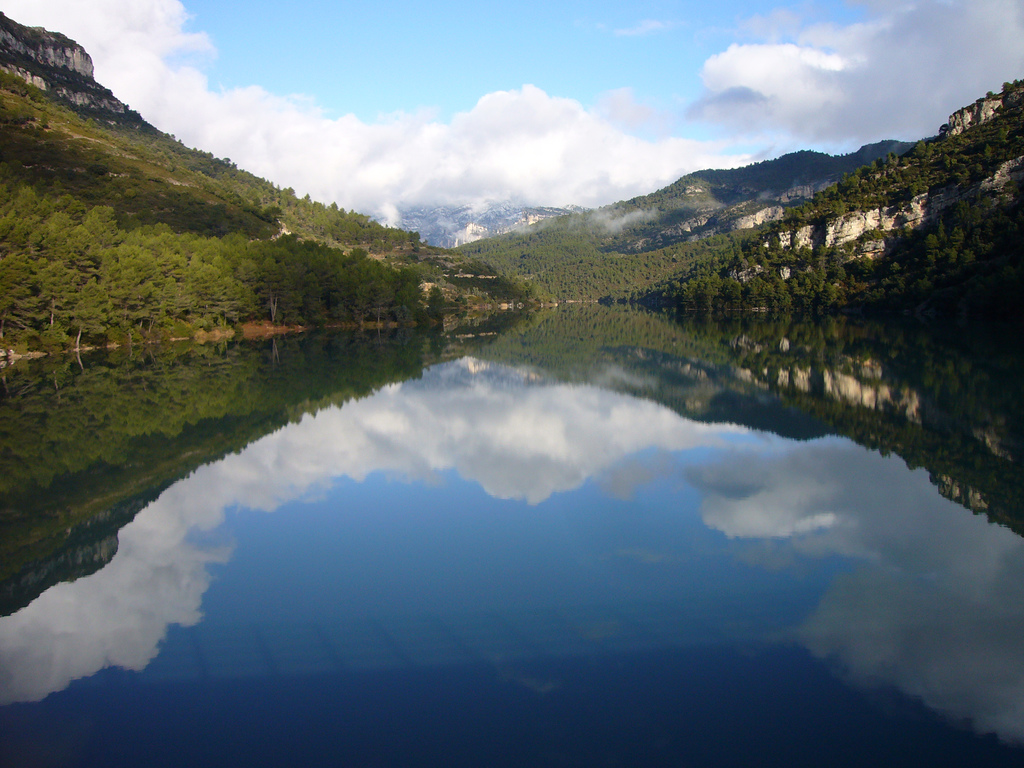
Ulldecona Dam in the Tinença de Benifassà

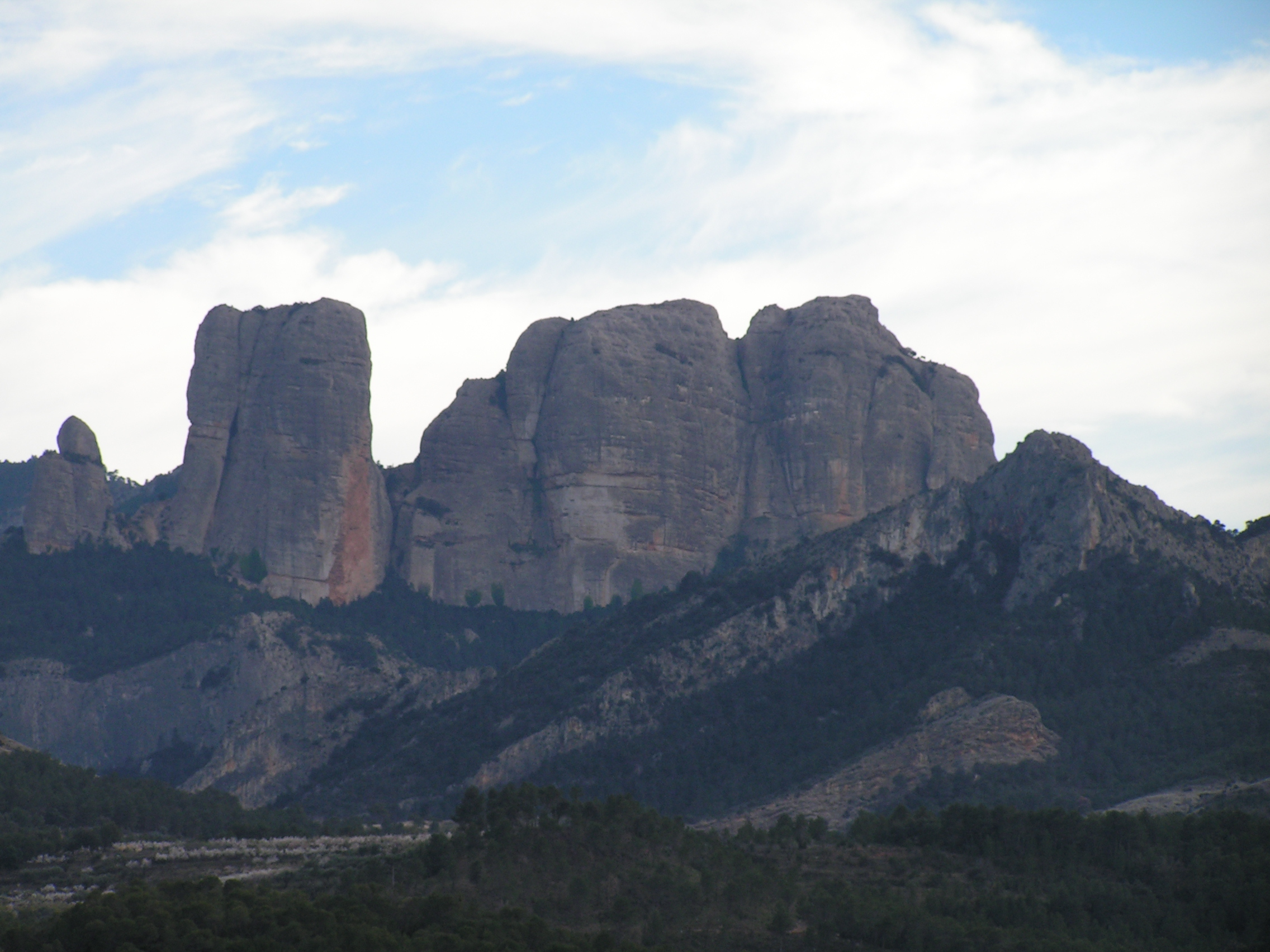
Roques de Benet near Arnes, Terra Alta
