= Paüls =

- Municipality
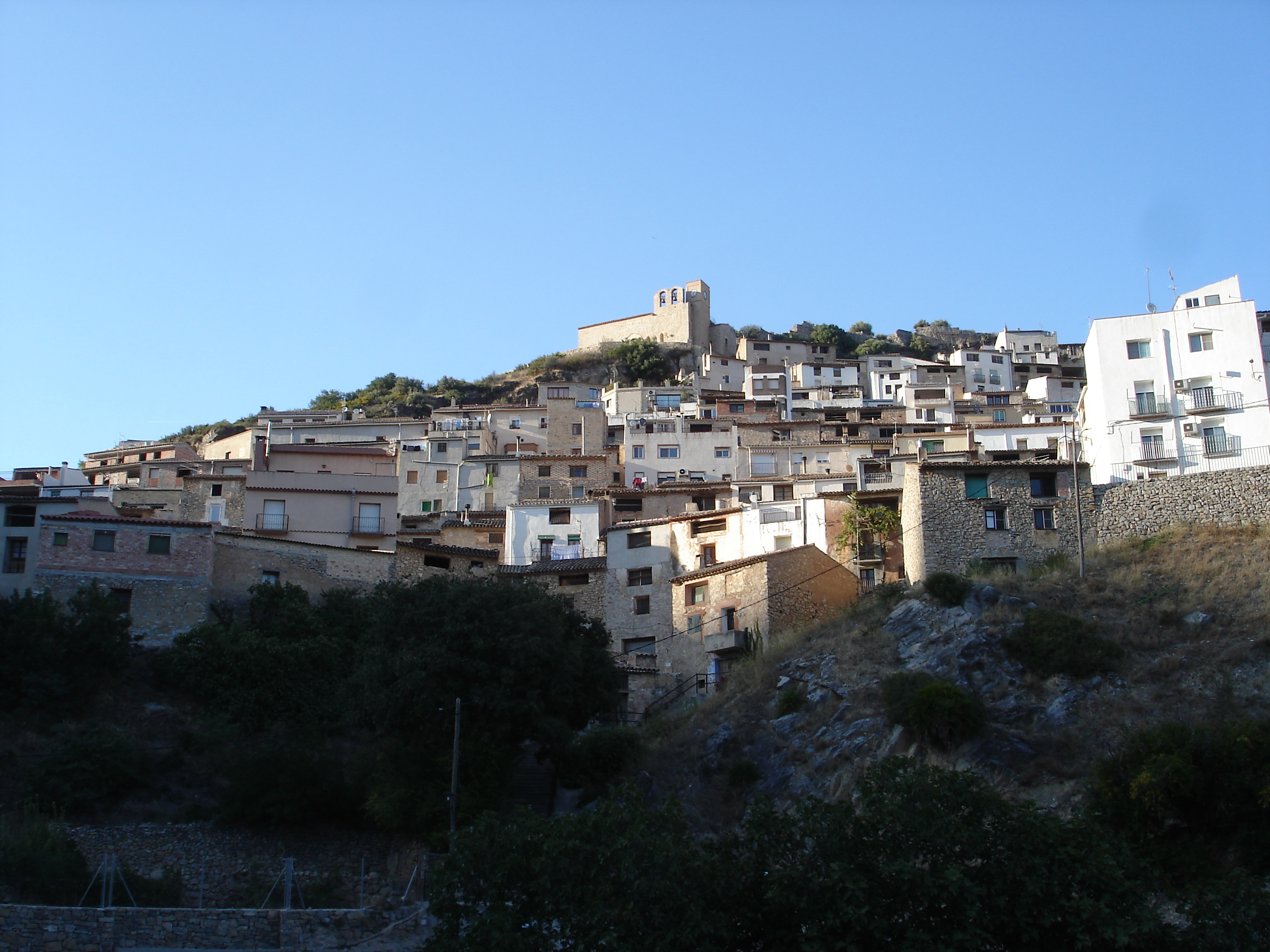

- Location in Catalonia
- Coordinates: 40°55′27″N 0°24′01″E
- Country: Spain
- Community: Catalonia
- Province: Tarragona
- Comarca: Baix Ebre

Government
  - Mayor: Enric Adell Moragrega (2015)

Area
  - Total: 43.8 km^{2} (16.9 sq mi)
- Elevation: 378 m (1,240 ft)

Population (2025-01-01)
  - Total: 558
  - Density: 12.7/km^{2} (33.0/sq mi)
- Postal code: 43102
- Website: www.pauls.altanet.org

Paüls (Catalan pronunciation: [paˈuls]) is a municipality in the comarca of Baix Ebre, province of Tarragona, Catalonia, Spain. It has a population of 558 (register office, 2025).

The Montsagre de Paüls mountain range rises above the town.
