= La Moleta (Alfara de Carles) =

Mountain in Spain

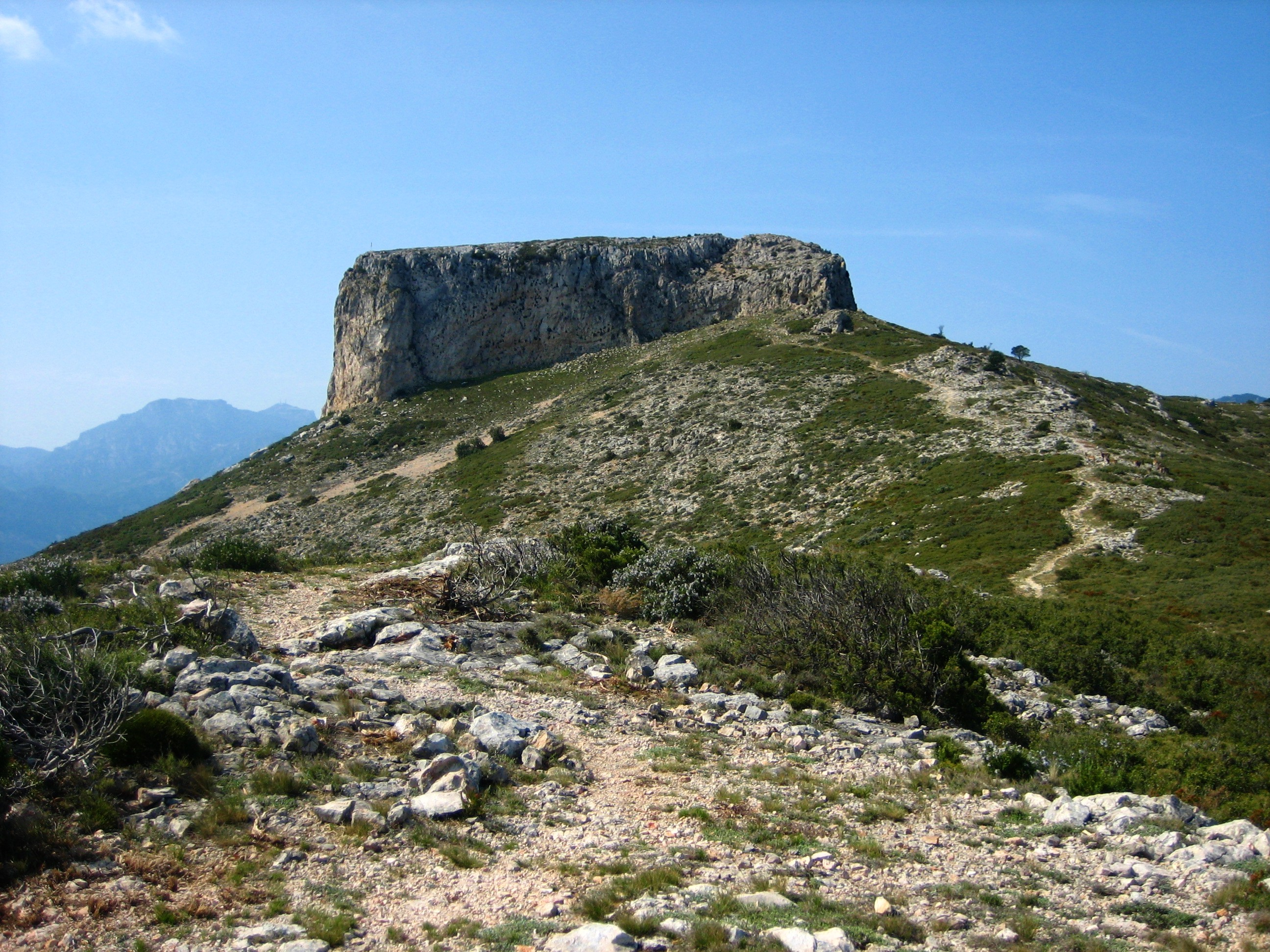

Highest point
- Elevation: 812 m (2,664 ft)
- Coordinates: 40°53′57.4″N 00°25′04.5″E

Geography
- Location: Baix Ebre, Catalonia
- Parent range: Serra de l'Espina (Catalan Pre-Coastal Range)

Geology
- Mountain type: Karstic

Climbing
- Easiest route: From Alfara de Carles

La Moleta or Moleta d'Alfara is a mountain of the Serra de l'Espina, a northern prolongation of the Ports de Tortosa-Beseit, Catalonia, Spain. It has an elevation of 812 metres above sea level. La Moleta rises about 5 km NNW above the village of Alfara de Carles. It is readily identifiable from afar, for its striking squarish shape contrasts sharply with the other summits of the mountain chain.

== See also ==
- Ports de Tortosa-Beseit
- Mountains of Catalonia
