= Penyagalera =

Mountain in Spain

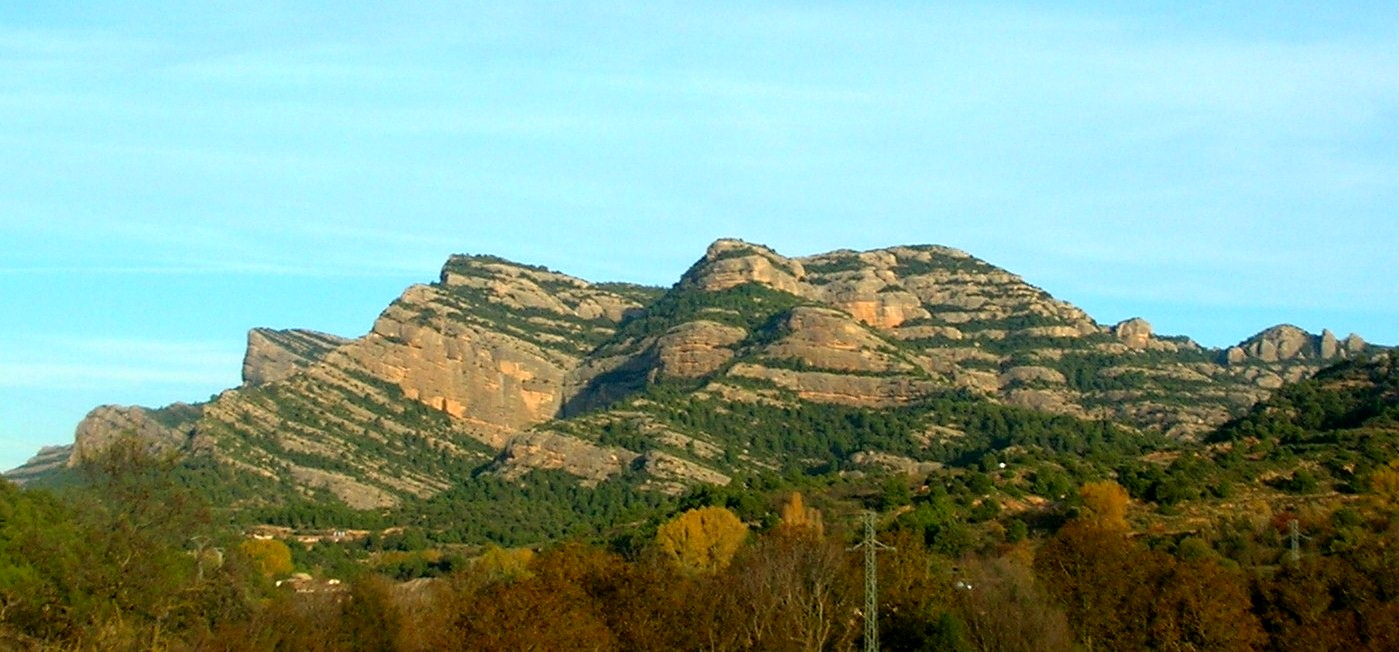

Highest point
- Elevation: 1,034 m (3,392 ft)
- Coordinates: 40°38′55″N 00°14′33.8″E

Geography
- Location within Spain
- Location: Matarranya, Aragon
- Parent range: Ports de Tortosa-Beseit

Geology
- Mountain type: Limestone

Climbing
- Easiest route: Hike from Beseit (Beceite)

Penyagalera (Catalan pronunciation: [ˌpɛɲəɣəˈlɛɾə]) is a rocky mountain in the northern side of the Ports de Tortosa-Beseit, Aragon, Spain. Punta de Penyagalera, the highest summit, has an altitude of 1,034.4 metres above sea level.

Penyagalera, the name of the mountain (penya "rock" and galera "galley" in Catalan) derives from the fact that it looks like a ship keel upwards from certain angles.

== See also ==
- Ports de Tortosa-Beseit
- Mountains of Aragon
- Iberian System
