= Serra de Paüls =

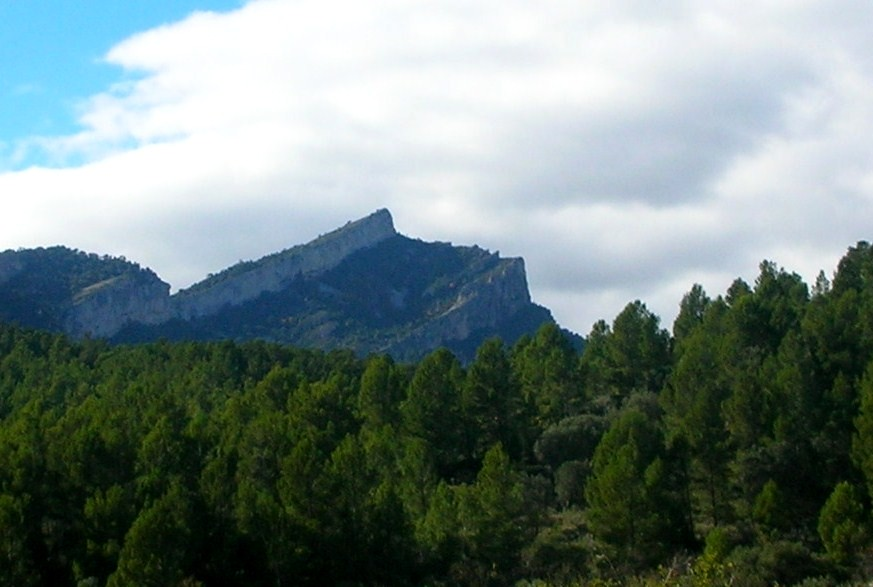
- Montsagre de Paüls

Highest point
- Peak: Punta de l'Aigua
- Elevation: 1,091.6 m (3,581 ft)
- Coordinates: 40°56′52.8″N 0°23′15.5″E

Geography
- Location within Catalonia
- Location: Terra Alta and Baix Ebre
- Parent range: Ports de Tortosa-Beseit

Geology
- Orogeny: Alpine orogeny
- Rock type: Limestone

Climbing
- Easiest route: Drive from Paüls or Prat de Comte

Serra de Paüls is a mountain range in the northern side of the Ports de Tortosa-Beseit, Catalonia, Spain. The highest summit, Punta de l'Aigua has an elevation of 1,091.6 metres above sea level.

== Geography ==
The central part of the range is known as Montsagre de Paüls.

This range is named after the town of Paüls, located on its SE side. Together with neighboring and parallel Serra de l'Espina the Serra de Paüls is within the geological area that connects the Ports de Tortosa-Beseit mountain massif with the Catalan Pre-Coastal Range.

== See also ==
- Ports de Tortosa-Beseit
- Mountains of Catalonia
- Iberian System
