= Arnes, Spain =

Arnes
- Municipality
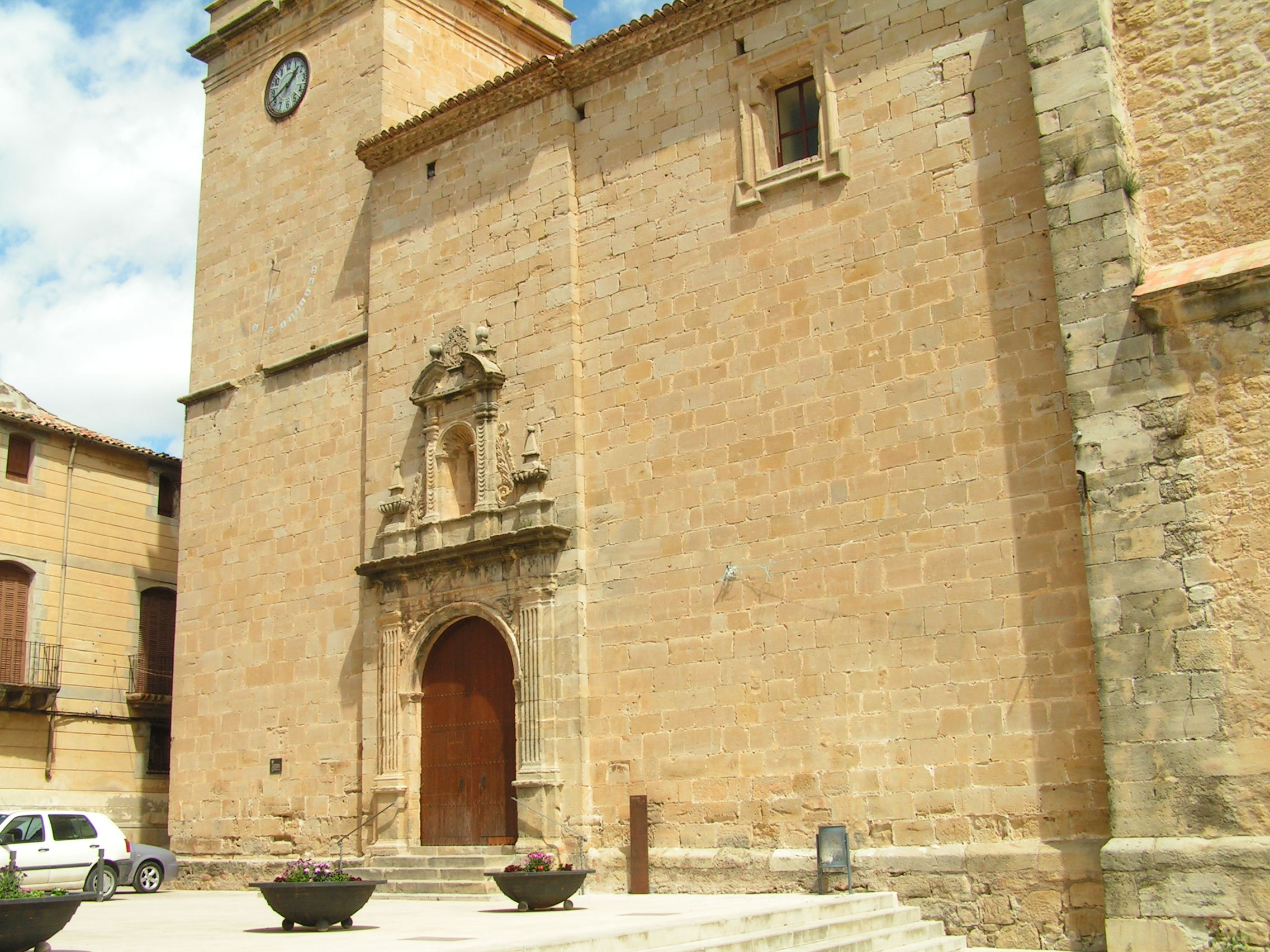
- Arnes church

- Coat of arms

- Location in Catalonia
- Coordinates: 40.912°N 0.262°E
- Country: Spain
- Community: Catalonia
- Province: Tarragona
- Comarca: Terra Alta

Government
  - mayor: Francesc Xavier Pallarés Povill (2015)

Area
  - Total: 43.0 km^{2} (16.6 sq mi)
- Elevation: 506 m (1,660 ft)

Population (2025-01-01)
  - Total: 461
  - Density: 10.7/km^{2} (27.8/sq mi)
- Postal code: 43018
- Climate: Csa
- Website: www.arnes.altanet.org

Arnes (Catalan pronunciation: [ˈaɾnes]) is a municipality in the comarca of la Terra Alta in Catalonia, Spain. It has a population of 461 (register office, 2025).

== Main sights ==
The most noteworthy building of this town is the Town Hall, an example of Catalan Renaissance art. It was built in 1584 by Joan Vilabona of Queretes in nearby Matarranya.

There is a raised area with benches close to the church shaded by mulberry trees with views over the Roques de Benet, among other mountains of the Ports de Tortosa-Beseit. Local people like to sit there in the afternoon enjoying the landscape.

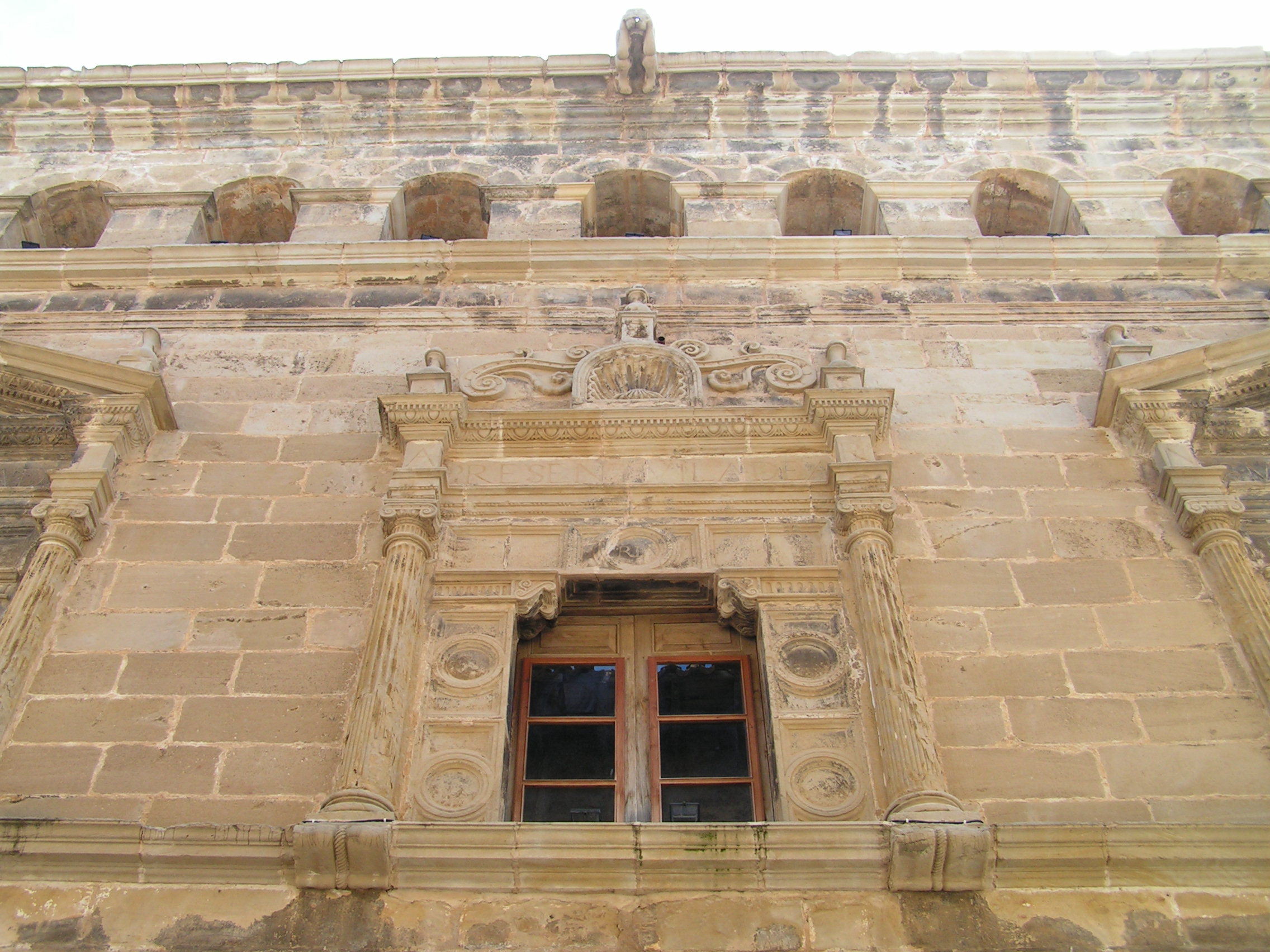
A window of the Town Hall.

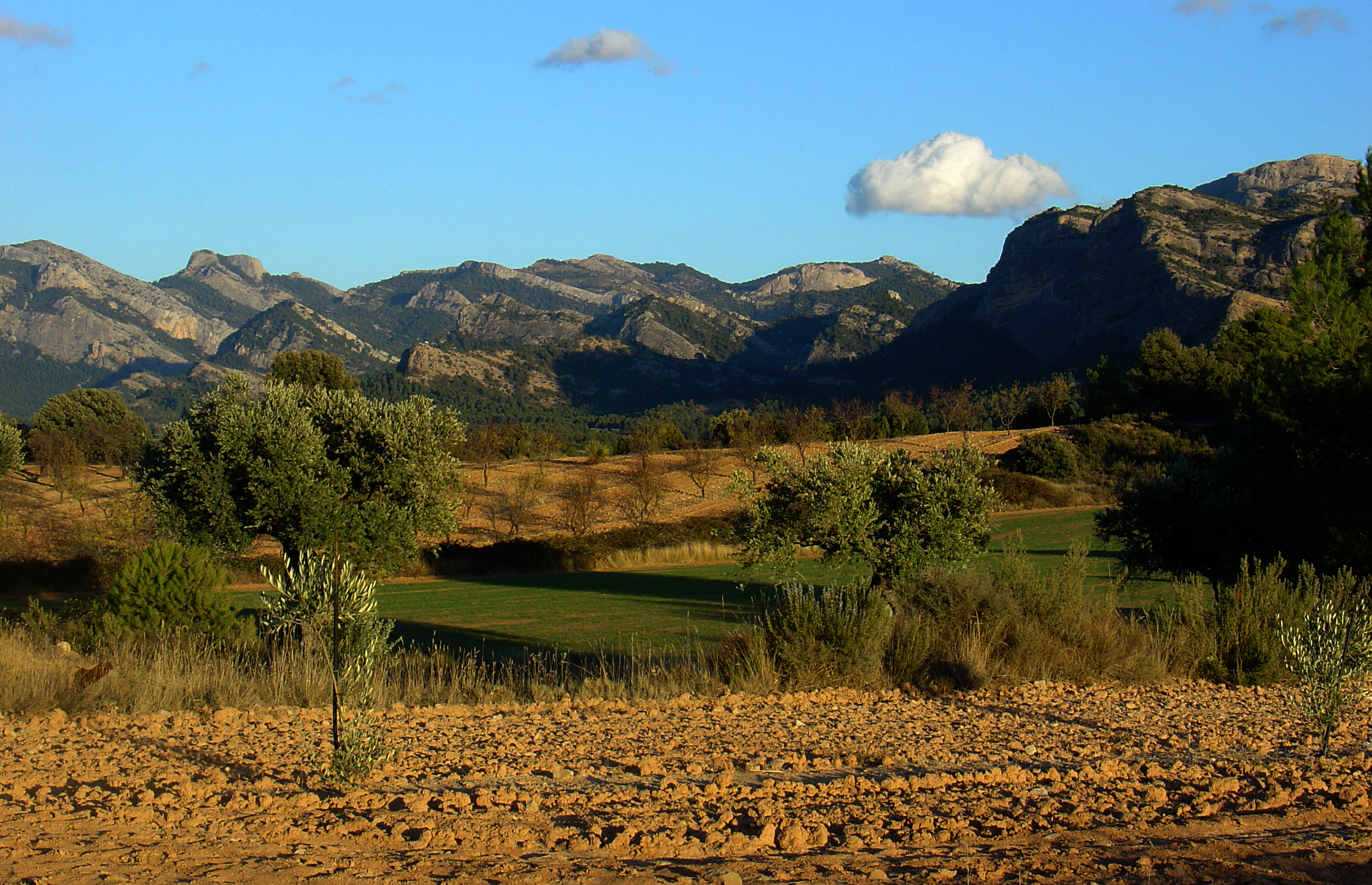
View of the Ports de Beseit from the town.
