= Alfara de Carles =

- Municipality
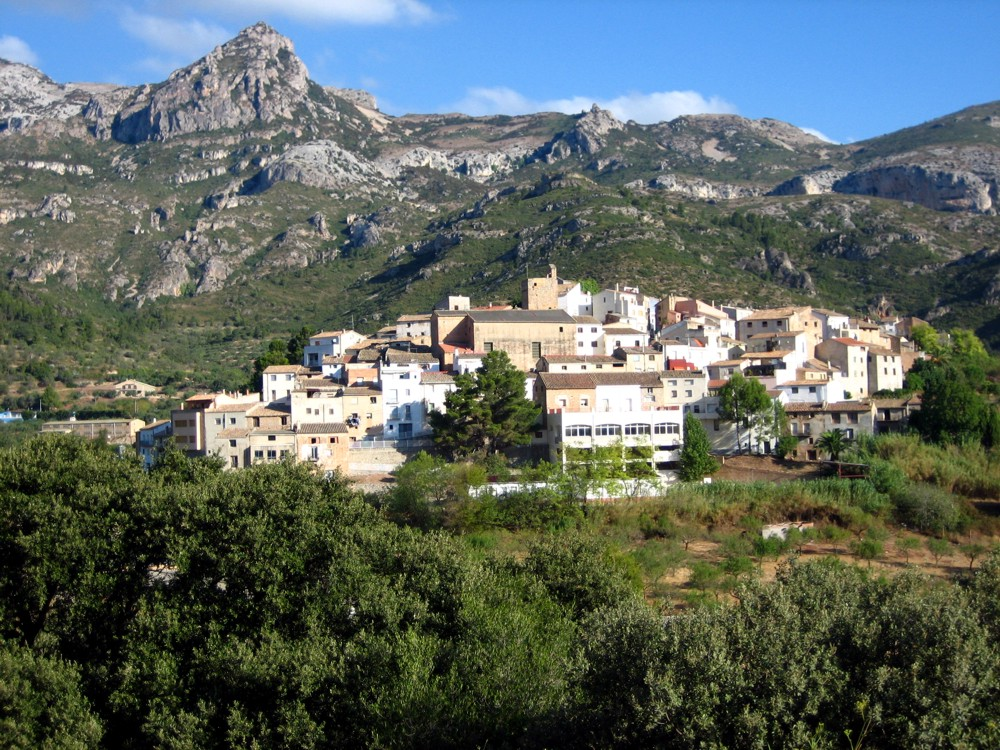
- View of Alfara de Carles with the Serra de l'Espina in the background

- Flag Coat of arms

- Location in Catalonia
- Coordinates: 40°52′N 0°24′E
- Country: Spain
- Community: Catalonia
- Province: Tarragona
- Comarca: Baix Ebre

Government
  - Mayor: Jordi Forné Ribé (2019)

Area
  - Total: 63.9 km^{2} (24.7 sq mi)

Population (2025-01-01)
  - Total: 355
  - Density: 5.56/km^{2} (14.4/sq mi)
- Website: www.alfaracarles.cat

Alfara de Carles (Catalan pronunciation: [alˈfaɾa ðe ˈkaɾles]) is a municipality in the comarca of Baix Ebre, in the province of Tarragona, in Catalonia, Spain.

It has a population of 355 (register office, 2025).

== See also ==
- La Moleta (Alfara de Carles)
