= Mont Caro =

Mountain in northeast Spain

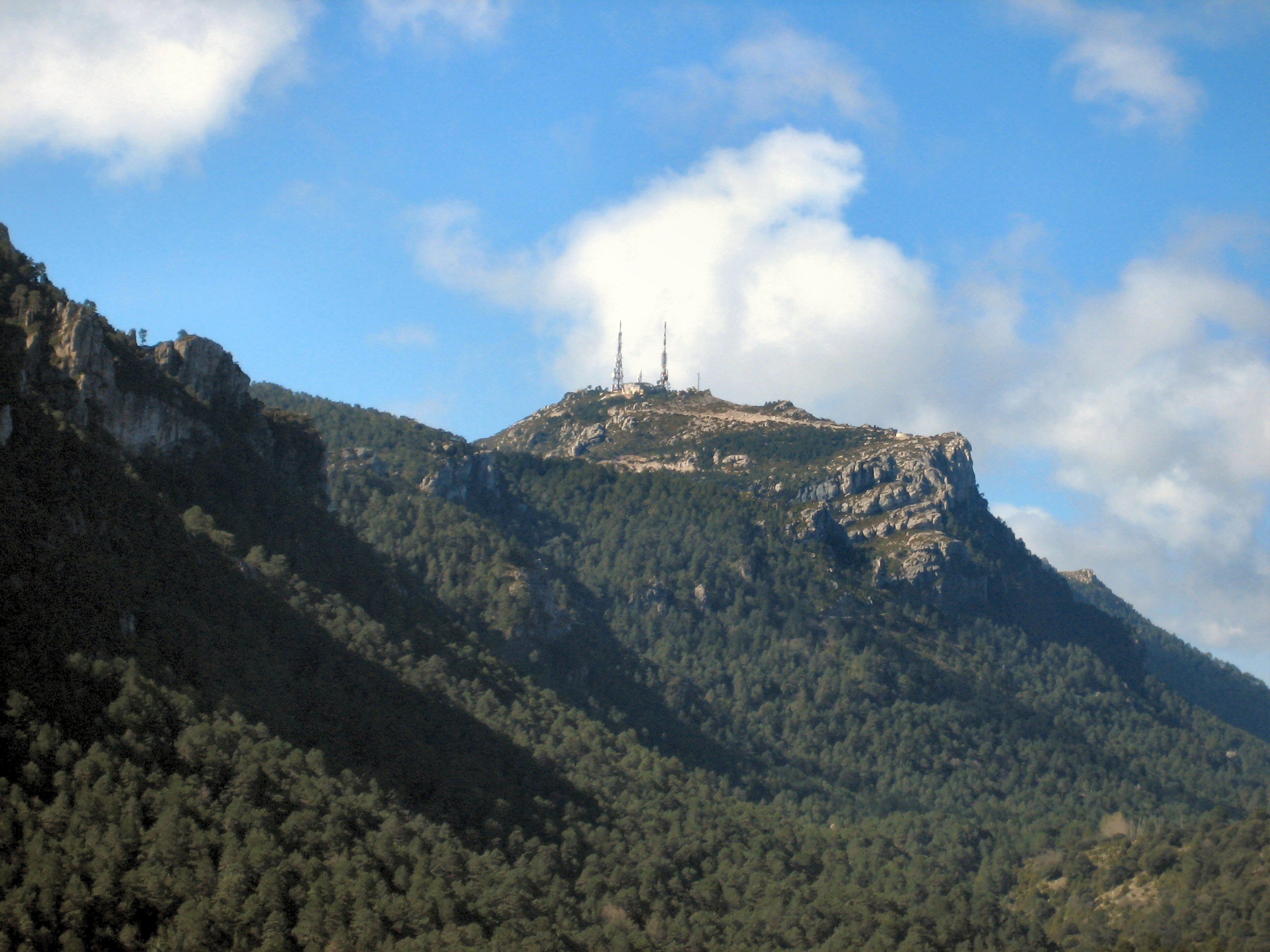

Highest point
- Elevation: 1,441 m (4,728 ft)
- Listing: Mountains of Catalonia
- Coordinates: 40°48′11.18″N 0°20′35.13″E

Geography
- Location within Catalonia Location within Spain
- Location: Baix Ebre, Catalonia
- Parent range: Ports de Tortosa-Beseit

Geology
- Mountain type: Karstic

Climbing
- Easiest route: Driving from Tortosa

Mont Caro (Catalan pronunciation: [ˈmoŋ ˈkaɾu]) or Caro is the highest mountain of the Ports de Tortosa-Beseit, Catalonia, Spain.

== Geography ==
It has an elevation of 1,441 metres above sea level. There are two large antennas and a Virgin Mary shrine on top of the summit.

This mountain is often covered with snow in the winter.

== See also ==
- Iberian System
