= Matarranya (river) =

River in Spain

Coordinates: 41°11′00.89″N 00°09′50.51″E

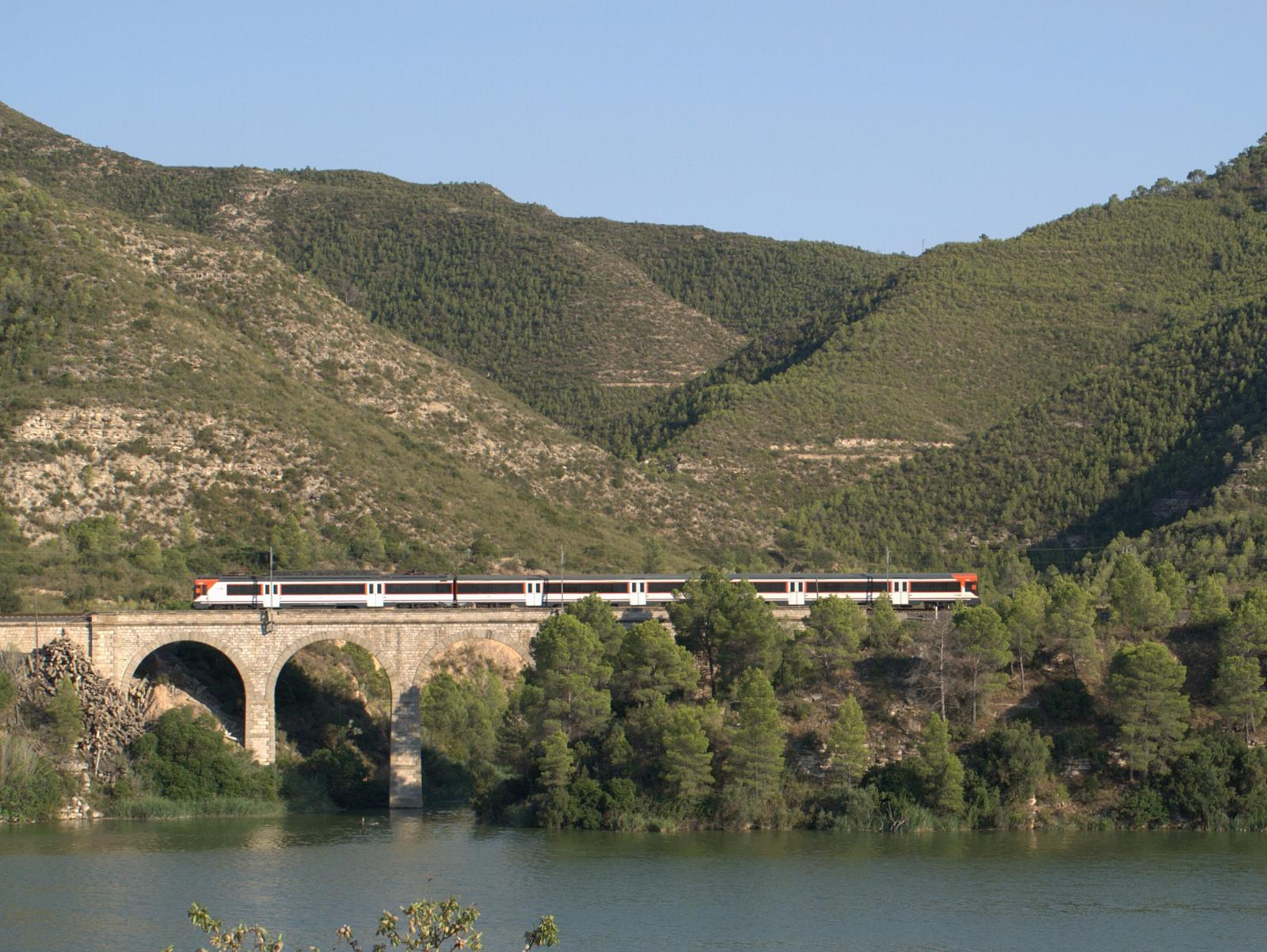
- Bridge over the Matarranya River close to Faió

Location
- Country: Aragon, Spain

Physical characteristics
- Source
  - location: Barranc del Salt, Ports de Beseit
  - elevation: 1,200 m (3,900 ft)
- Mouth
  - location: Ebro
  - elevation: 75 m (246 ft)
- Length: 100 km (62 mi)
- Basin size: 1,250 km^{2} (480 sq mi)
- Discharge
  - average: 6.51 m^{3}/s (230 cu ft/s)

Basin features
- Progression: Ebro→ Balearic Sea

The Matarranya (Spanish: Río Matarraña, Catalan: Riu Matarranya) is a river in the provinces of Teruel and Zaragoza, Aragon, Spain. It begins its course at 1,200 m northeast of the Tossal d'Encanader, Ports de Beseit. limestone massif near La Pobla de Benifassà.

The Matarranya flows roughly from south to north into the Ebro (Ebre), 4 km east of Faió (Fayón). This river gives its name to the Matarranya Catalan language-speaking comarca of Aragon.

== Tributaries ==
- From the left:
  - Algars River
  - Ulldemó River
  - Barranc de Calapatar
- From the right:
  - De Pena River
  - Tastavins River

== See also ==
- Ports de Beseit
- Matarraña/Matarranya comarca
