= Pic de Montcalm =

Mountain in France

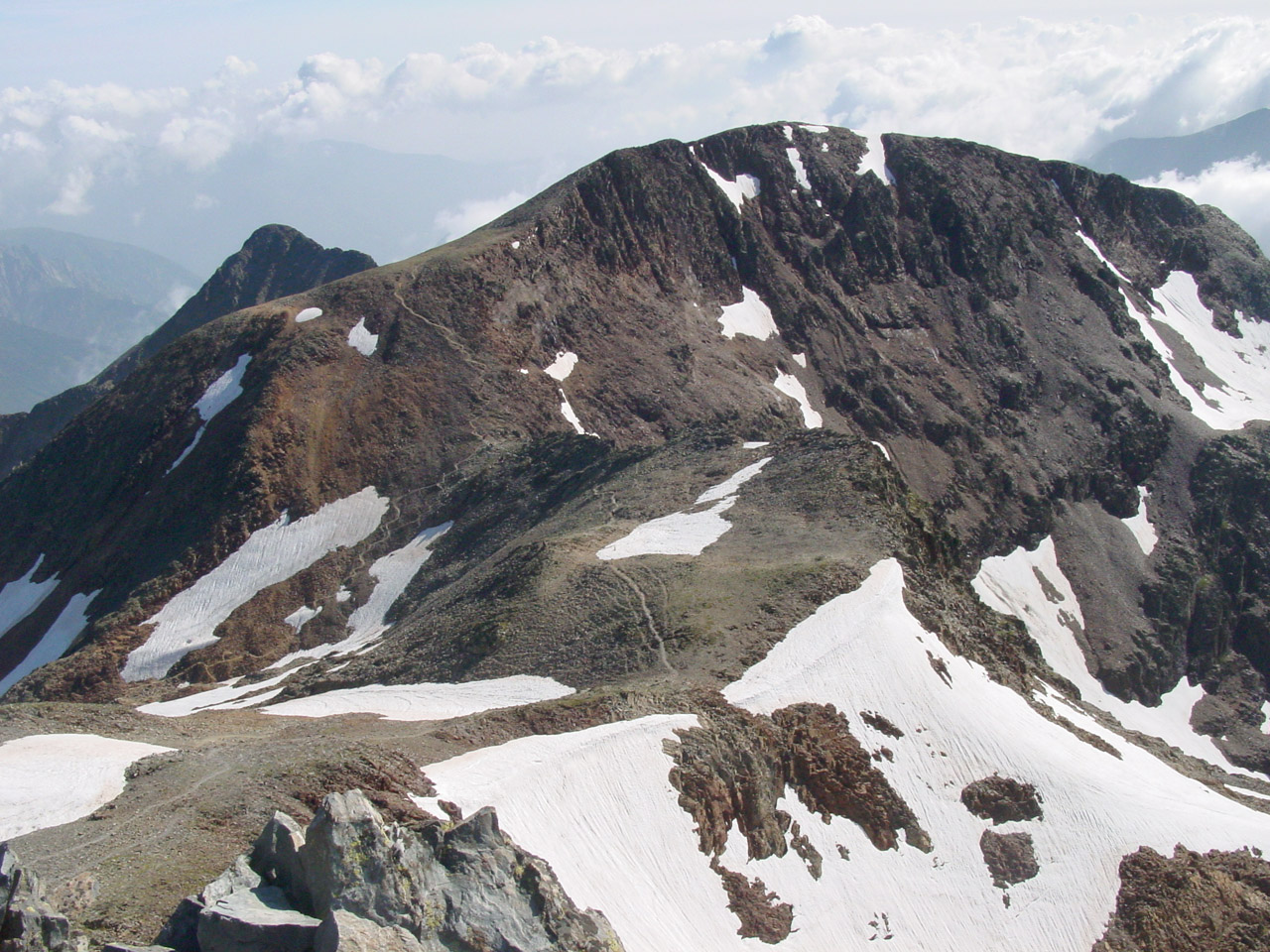
- Pic de Montcalm view from Pica d'Estats

Highest point
- Elevation: 3,077 m (10,095 ft)
- Prominence: 89 m (292 ft)
- Listing: List of Pyrenean three-thousanders
- Coordinates: 42°40′20″N 01°24′23″E

Geography
- Location within Pyrenees
- Location: Ariège, Midi-Pyrénées, France
- Parent range: Pyrenees

Geology
- Mountain type: Granite

Climbing
- First ascent: 18 July 1807 by Candolle and Simon Faure
- Easiest route: From the Pinet (France) or the Vall Ferrera (Spain)

Pic de Montcalm is a French Pyrenean summit, culminating at 3,077 m (10,095 ft), located in the Ariège department, Midi-Pyrénées region of France.

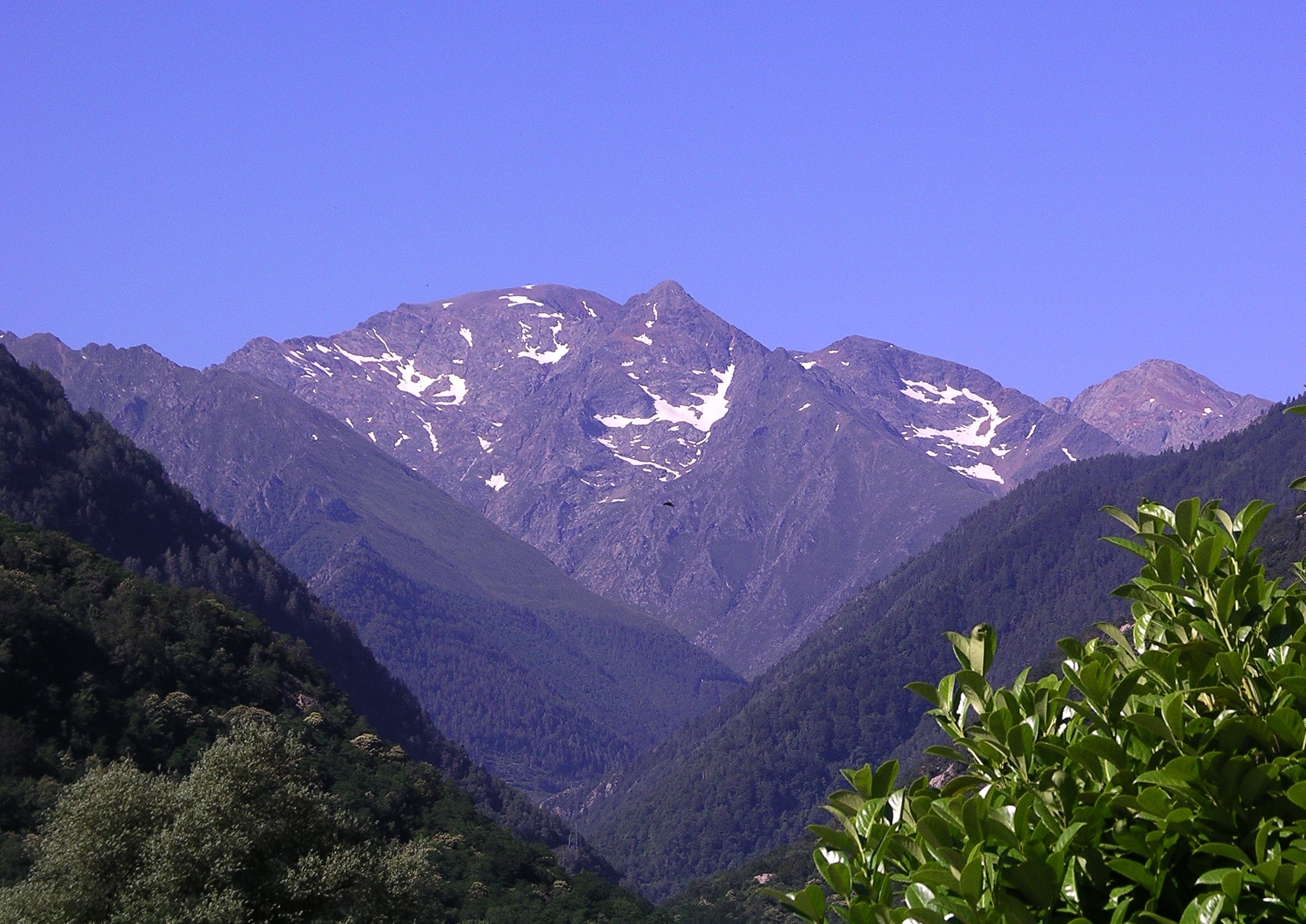
Pic de Montcalm seen from the Vicdessos valley

== Topography ==
Located in the Ariège south of Auzat in the Vicdessos, it lies slightly north of the Franco-Spanish borderline crest.

La pique du Montcalm (Ariège appellation), la pique d'Estats and the pic du port de Sullo are the three main summits of the massif du Montcalm, the last two bordering Spain and la Pica d'Estats the highest summit in Catalonia.

The summit is located in the perimeter of the parc naturel régional des Pyrénées ariégeoises.

== History ==
The first ascent was made on July 18, 1807 by Augustin Pyramus de Candolle along with guide Simon Faure.

== Access ==
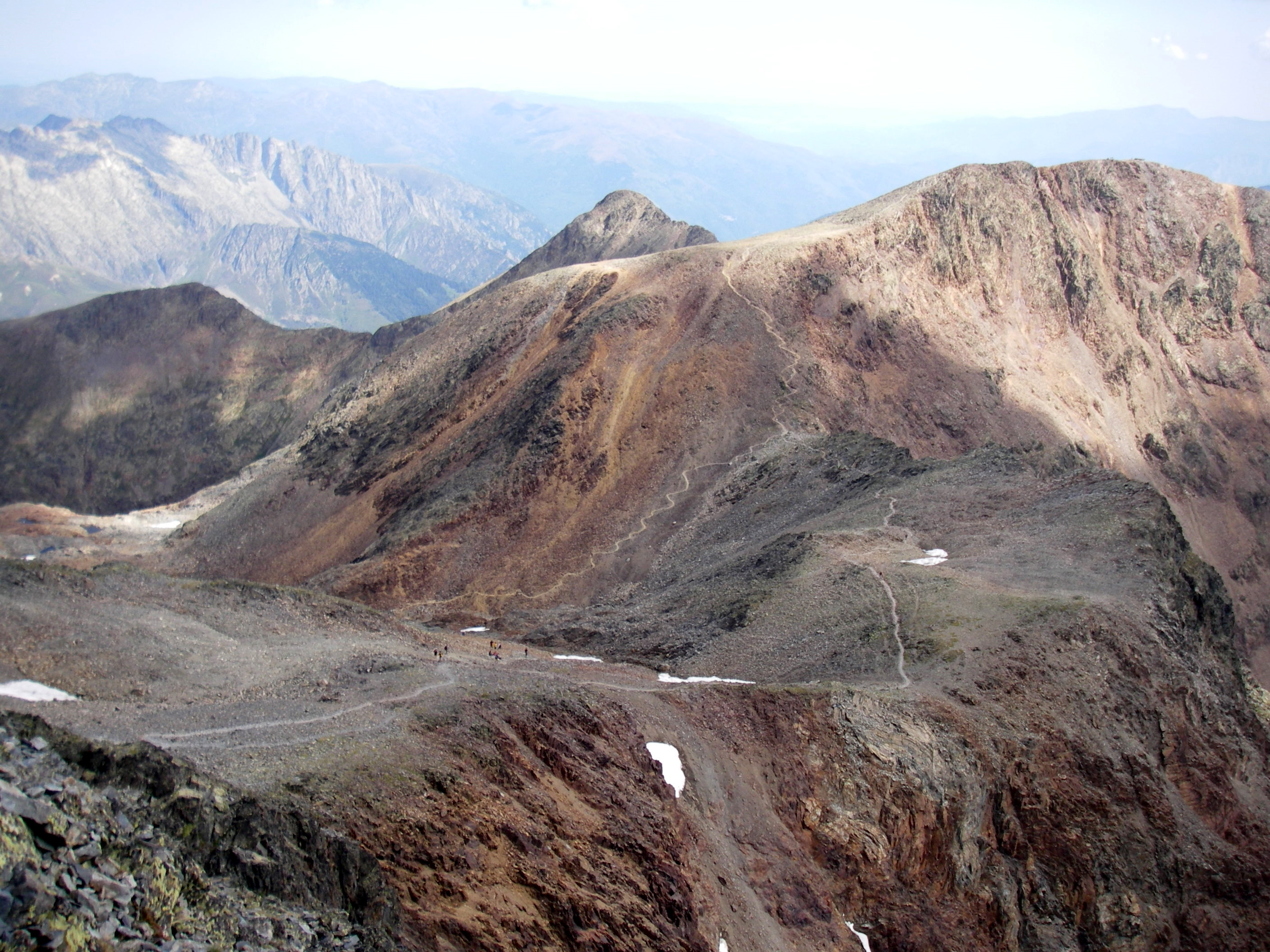
View of the pass and path leading up to the Pic de Montcalm; in the foreground, the path for the final ascent towards the Pica d'Estats.

On the French side, three main itineraries are possible:

- by the Pinet refuge, located next to the Lake Pinet: the path (tagged red and white) is the easiest (namely downhill) and most used itinerary.
- by the Soulcem valley and the Riufret couloir: some passages are difficult going downhill. It is poorly signed.
- by the Pujol valley and the Pla Subra: which used to be the conventional track, used by the first Pyrenean pioneers. The route begins at the chalet du Montcalm (also called "Refuge du Montcalm") located by the route de l'Artigue, 1 km after the hamlet of Marc. The route gradually lost its status as the normal route due to certain difficult passages, below and above the Tables du Montcalm.

On the Spanish side: by the Vall Ferrera, from the Pica d'Estats from which one can reach the Montcalm by the col de l'Estats, French side.
