= Montcalm =

Montcalm may refer to:

== People ==
- Louis-Joseph de Montcalm (1712–1759), commander of the French forces in North America during the French and Indian War
- Noelle Montcalm (born 1988), Canadian hurdler
- Térez Montcalm (born 1963), Canadian jazz singer and songwriter

== Vessels ==
- French ship Montcalm, four ships of the French Navy
- USS Montcalm (AT-39), a United States Navy fleet ocean tug
- Montcalm, a British cargo liner

== Places ==
=== Algeria ===
- Tamlouka, a small village formerly known as Montcalm

=== Canada ===
- Rural Municipality of Montcalm, Manitoba
- Montcalm, Quebec, a municipality
- Montcalm Regional County Municipality, Quebec
- Montcalm (federal electoral district), a federal electoral district in Quebec
- Montcalm (provincial electoral district), a former Quebec provincial electoral district

=== France ===
- Montcalm Massif, in the Pyrenees
- Pic de Montcalm, a mountain peak in the Pyrenees
- Montcalm (Vauvert), a small hamlet near Vauvert
- Rue Montcalm, a residential street in the 18th arrondissement of Paris named after Louis-Joseph de Montcalm

=== United States ===
- Montcalm, New Hampshire, an unincorporated community
- Montcalm, West Virginia, a census-designated place
- Montcalm Township, Michigan
- Montcalm County, Michigan

== Schools ==
- Montcalm Community College, Sidney, Michigan, United States
- Montcalm High School, part of the Mercer County Schools (West Virginia) School District
- Montcalm Secondary School, London, Ontario, Canada

== Other uses ==
- The Montcalm Hotel, a group of luxury hotels in central London
- HMCS Montcalm, a Royal Canadian Navy reserve unit
- Montcalm Sanitarium, a former tuberculosis treatment facility in Colorado Springs, Colorado, United States
- Montcalm mine, near Timmins, Ontario, Canada, owned by Falconbridge Ltd.
- Marathon du Montcalm, a former Skyrunner World Series race
- Montcalm, a model of the Meteor (automobile) first offered by Ford in Canada in 1959

== See also ==
- Montcalm Street station, a streetcar stop in Detroit, Michigan, United States
- Mount Calm, Texas, United States, a town
