= Pic de Canalbona =

Mountain in Spain

- Location within Pyrenees

Highest point
- Elevation: 2,965 m (9,728 ft)
- Listing: Mountains in Catalonia
- Coordinates: 42°39′23.57″N 1°24′21.41″E

Geography
- Location: Ariège, France; Pallars Sobirà, Spain
- Parent range: Montcalm Massif, Pyrenees

Geology
- Mountain type: Granite

Climbing
- First ascent: Unknown
- Easiest route: From Vallferrera, Alins.

Pic de Canalbona is a mountain of Catalonia, Spain. Located in the Montcalm Massif, Pyrenees, it has an altitude of 2,965 metres (9,728 ft) above sea level.

The Estanyol Occidental de Canalbona or Estany de Canalbona is a small glacial lake located between the Pic de Canalbona and the Rodó de Canalbona, at the base of the "Collet Fals" in the Montcalm Massif near the Pica d'Estats. The lake drains towards the Catalan side. Most years the ice completely melts by the end of summer.

This mountain should not be confused with the Pic Rodó de Canalbona, a higher neighboring summit.
