= Pic Verdaguer =

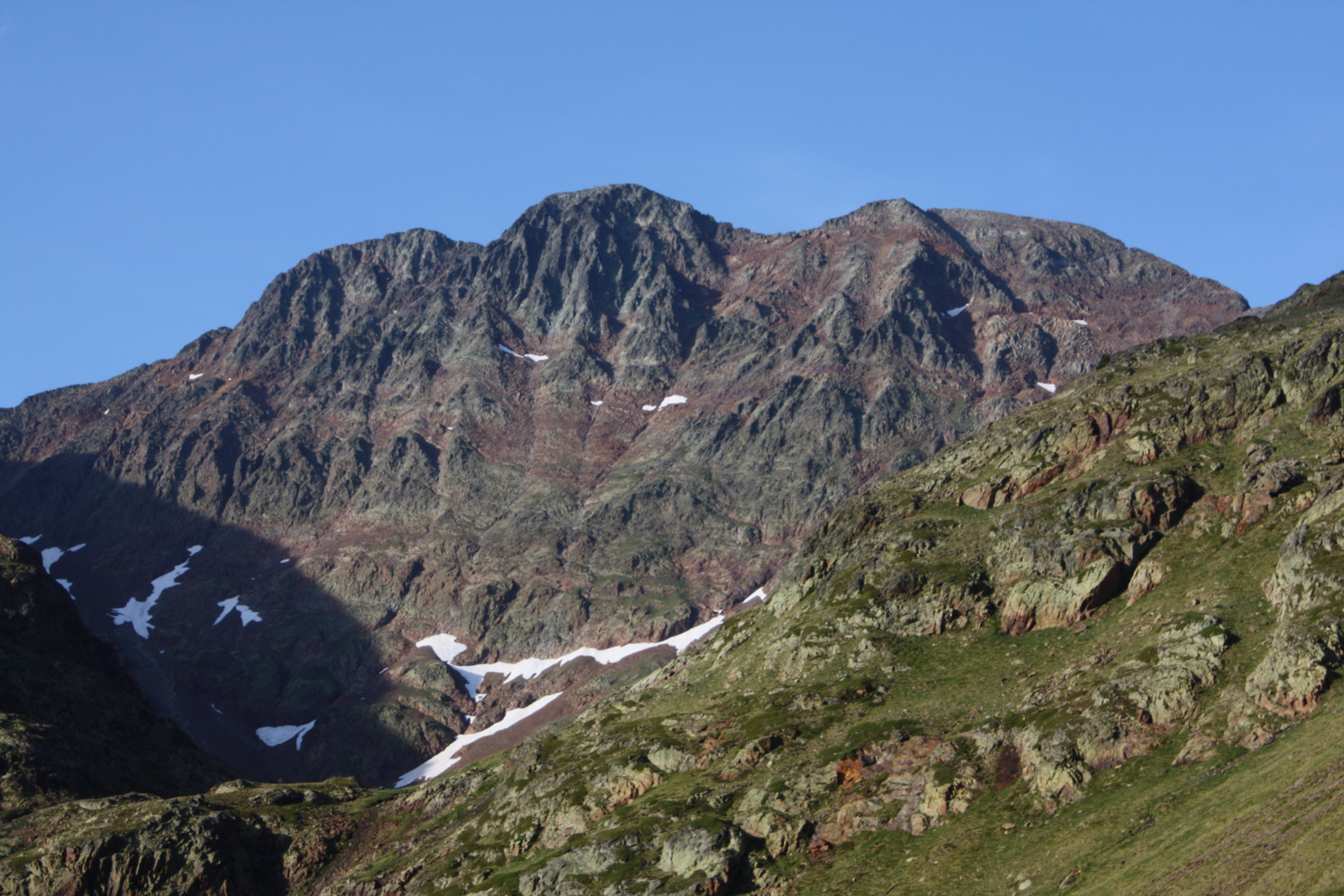
- Pic Verdaguer (left), Pica d'Estats (middle), Punta Gabarró (right)

Highest point
- Elevation: 3,129 m (10,266 ft)
- Prominence: 21 m (69 ft)
- Parent peak: Pica d'Estats (3143 m)
- Listing: Mountains of Catalonia; Pyrenean three-thousanders
- Coordinates: 42°40′5.02″N 1°23′48.98″E

Geography
- Location within Pyrenees
- Location: Ariège, France; Pallars Sobirà, Spain
- Protected area: Alt Pirineu Natural Park
- Parent range: Montcalm Massif, Pyrenees

Geology
- Mountain type: Granite

Climbing
- First ascent: Unknown
- Easiest route: From Vallferrera, Alins

Pic Verdaguer or Pic de Verdaguer is a mountain of the Montcalm Massif. Located in the Pyrenees, at the border between France and Spain, it has an altitude of 3,129 metres (10,266 ft) above sea level.

This mountain is included in the Alt Pirineu Natural Park together with Pica d'Estats and Punta Gabarró.
