= Gabarro =

Gabarro or Gabarró is Spanish surname. Notable people with the surname include:

- Inma Gabarro (born 2002), Spanish footballer
- Magdalena Oliver Gabarro, Spanish supercentenarian
- Pere Gabarró i Garcia (1899–1980), Spanish physician and professor, namesake of Punta Gabarró
