= Goulier =

Part of Val-de-Sos in Occitanie, France

- Part of Val-de-Sos
- Location of Goulier
- Location within France Location within Occitanie
- Coordinates: 42°45′22″N 1°30′15″E
- Country: France
- Region: Occitania
- Department: Ariège
- Arrondissement: Foix
- Canton: Sabarthès
- Commune: Val-de-Sos
- Area^{1}: 10.22 km^{2} (3.95 sq mi)
- Elevation: 1,084 m (3,556 ft)
- Highest elevation: 2,472 m (8,110 ft)
- Lowest elevation: 840 m (2,760 ft)
- Population (2021): 48
  - Density: 4.7/km^{2} (12/sq mi)
- Time zone: UTC+01:00 (CET)
  - Summer (DST): UTC+02:00 (CEST)
- Postal code: 09220
- ^{1} French Land Register data, which excludes lakes, ponds, glaciers > 1 km^{2} (0.386 sq mi or 247 acres) and river estuaries.

Goulier (French pronunciation: [ɡulje]; Languedocien: Golièr) is a former commune in the Ariège department in southwestern France. On 1 January 2019, it was merged into the new commune Val-de-Sos.

== Sights ==
- The Massot Cross
- The church
- Mill from the 18th century near the river
- Rente square, which lies at the north of the village, is the center of parties during the summer.
- The hole of Souzeton

== The ski resort ==
The ski station the only ski resort of Vicdessos valley. It is one of the smallest ski station of the Pyrénées.

== See also ==
- Communes of the Ariège department
