= Auzat =

Commune in Occitanie, France

- Commune
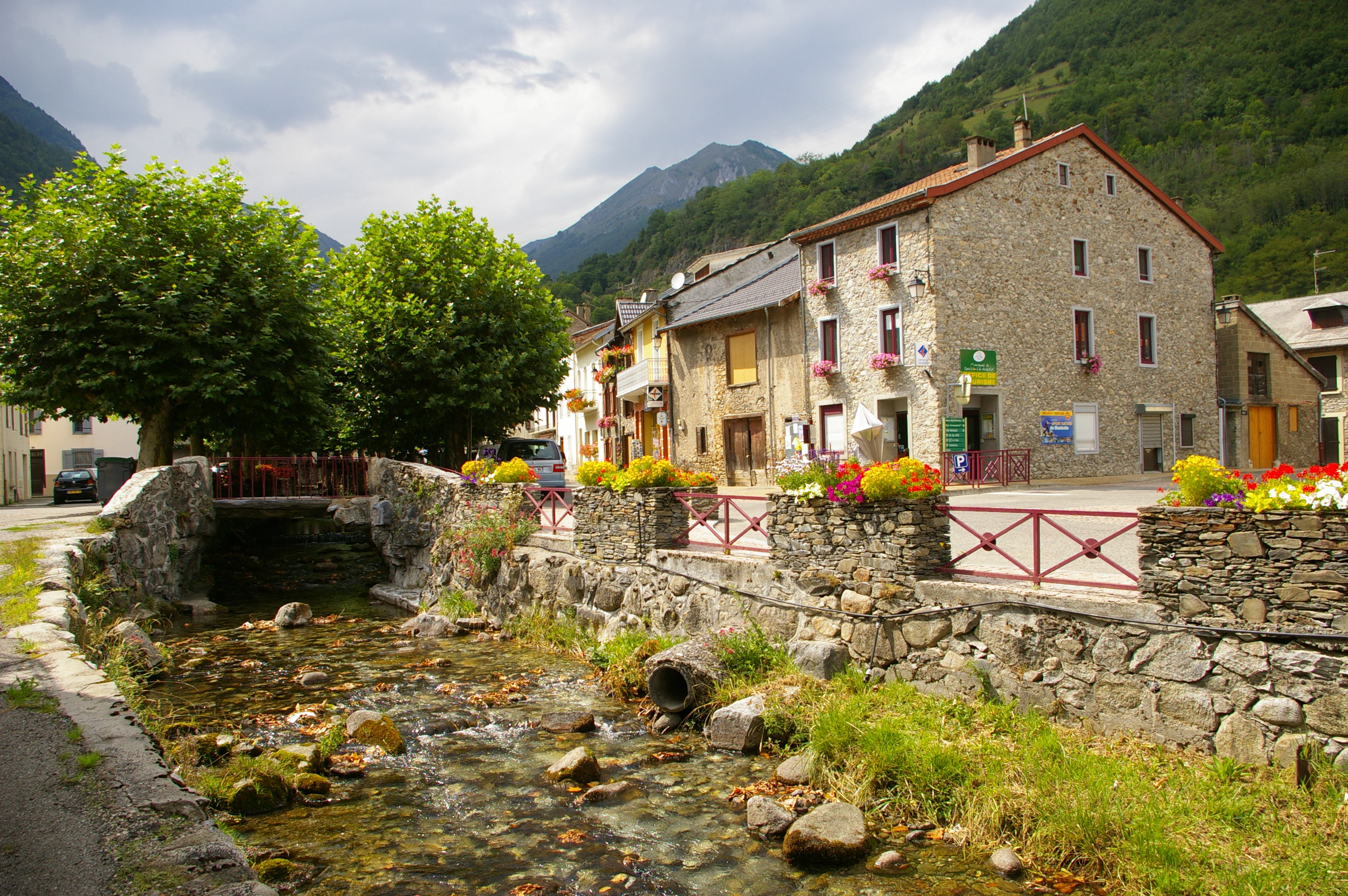
- The Rue des Pyrénées, in Auzat
- Location of Auzat
- Location within France Location within Occitanie
- Coordinates: 42°46′02″N 1°28′51″E
- Country: France
- Region: Occitania
- Department: Ariège
- Arrondissement: Foix
- Canton: Sabarthès
- Intercommunality: CC Haute-Ariège

Government
  - Mayor (2020–2026): Abdel El Yacoubi
- Area^{1}: 162.74 km^{2} (62.83 sq mi)
- Elevation: 737 m (2,418 ft)
- Highest elevation: 3,143 m (10,312 ft)
- Lowest elevation: 720 m (2,360 ft)
- Population (2023): 561
  - Density: 3.45/km^{2} (8.93/sq mi)
- Time zone: UTC+01:00 (CET)
  - Summer (DST): UTC+02:00 (CEST)
- INSEE/Postal code: 09030 /09220
- ^{1} French Land Register data, which excludes lakes, ponds, glaciers > 1 km^{2} (0.386 sq mi or 247 acres) and river estuaries.

Auzat (French pronunciation: [ozat]; Languedocien: Ausat) is a commune in the Ariège department in the Occitanie region of south-western France.

The commune has been awarded one flower by the National Council of Towns and Villages in Bloom in the Competition of cities and villages in Bloom.

== Geography ==
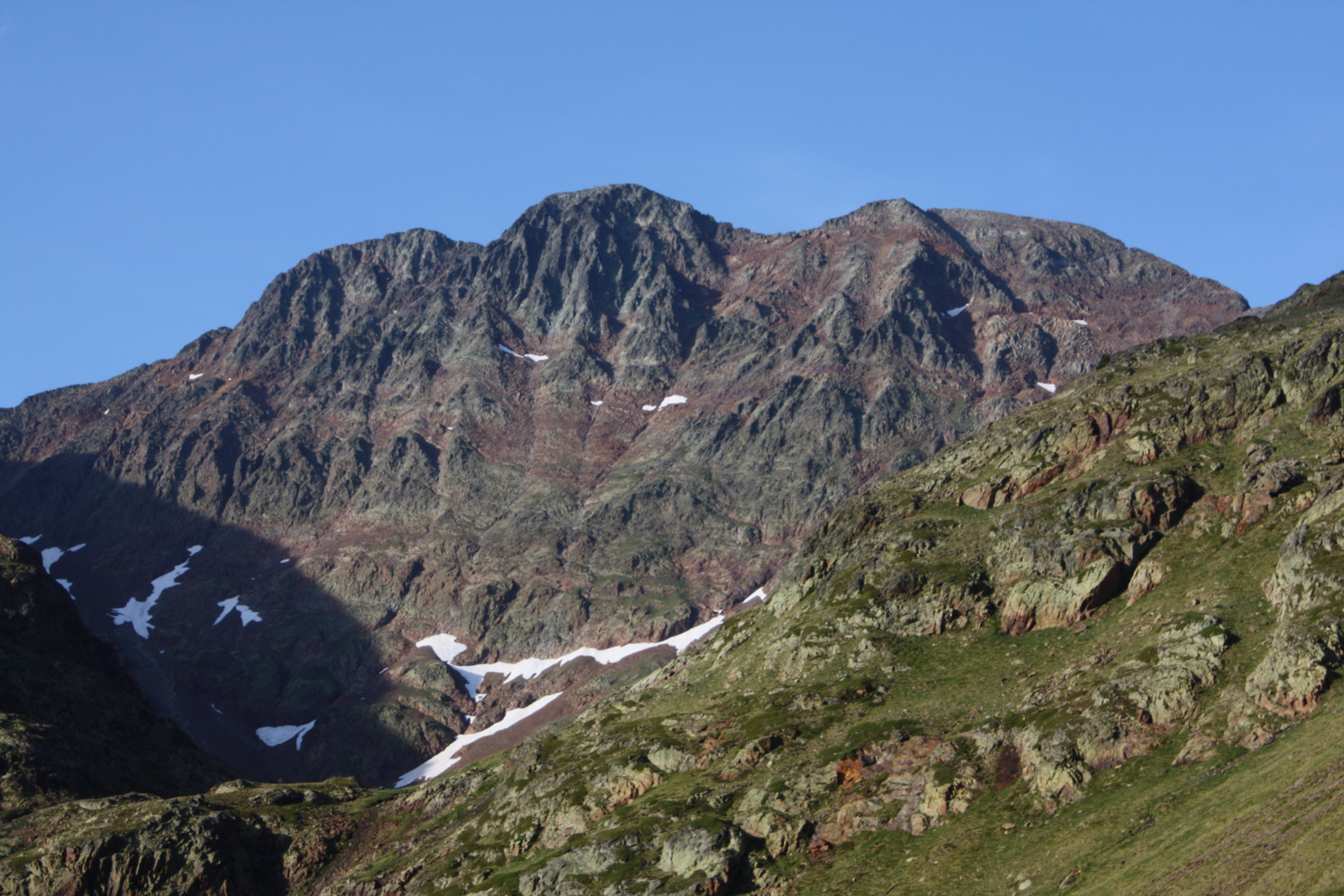
The Pica d'Estats

Auzat is located some 45 km south by south-west of Pamiers and 40 km north by north-west of Andorra la Vella. Its south-western border is the border between France and Spain and its south-eastern border is the border between France and Andorra. Access to the commune is by road D8 which branches from the D18 at Vicdessos and goes to the village then continues south to access the dam at Etang de Soulcem. Due to the extremely rugged terrain there is no access to Spain or Andorra from the commune. Its highest point is the Pica d'Estats (3143 m), which is located in the Montcalm Massif, exactly on the Spanish border.

Many streams rise in the south of the commune and flow north in two parallel main streams - the Ruisseau de la Coume de Subra and the Ruisseau de Mounicou. The Ruisseau de la Coume de Subra joins the Ruisseau de l'Artigue flowing east to join the Ruisseau de Mounicou which continues north to the village where it becomes the Ruisseau de Vicdessos then continues east to join the Ariège at Tarascon-sur-Ariège. There are also many lakes in the south of the commune with the Etang de Soulcem being the largest.

=== Hamlets and places in the commune ===
- Emperrot
- L'Artigue
- Marc
- Saleix
- Olbier
- Artiès
- Mounicou

=== Environment ===
The commune has a rich environment in terms of Wilderness and ecological potential but industrialization has left traces: in particular the disused Pechiney Aluminium Smelter (closed in 2003) left heavy environmental consequences.

The smelter was ranked 2 under Directive 96/82/EC (Seveso). The plant had an internal landfill site of 1.8 hectares located several kilometres from the smelter site at a place called Massada on the border with Vicdessos commune. This discharge area, as well as the groundwater and soil that supported the plant operations, are polluted by various pollutants including fluorides, cyanides, hydrocarbons, arsenic, aluminium, and barium.

== History ==
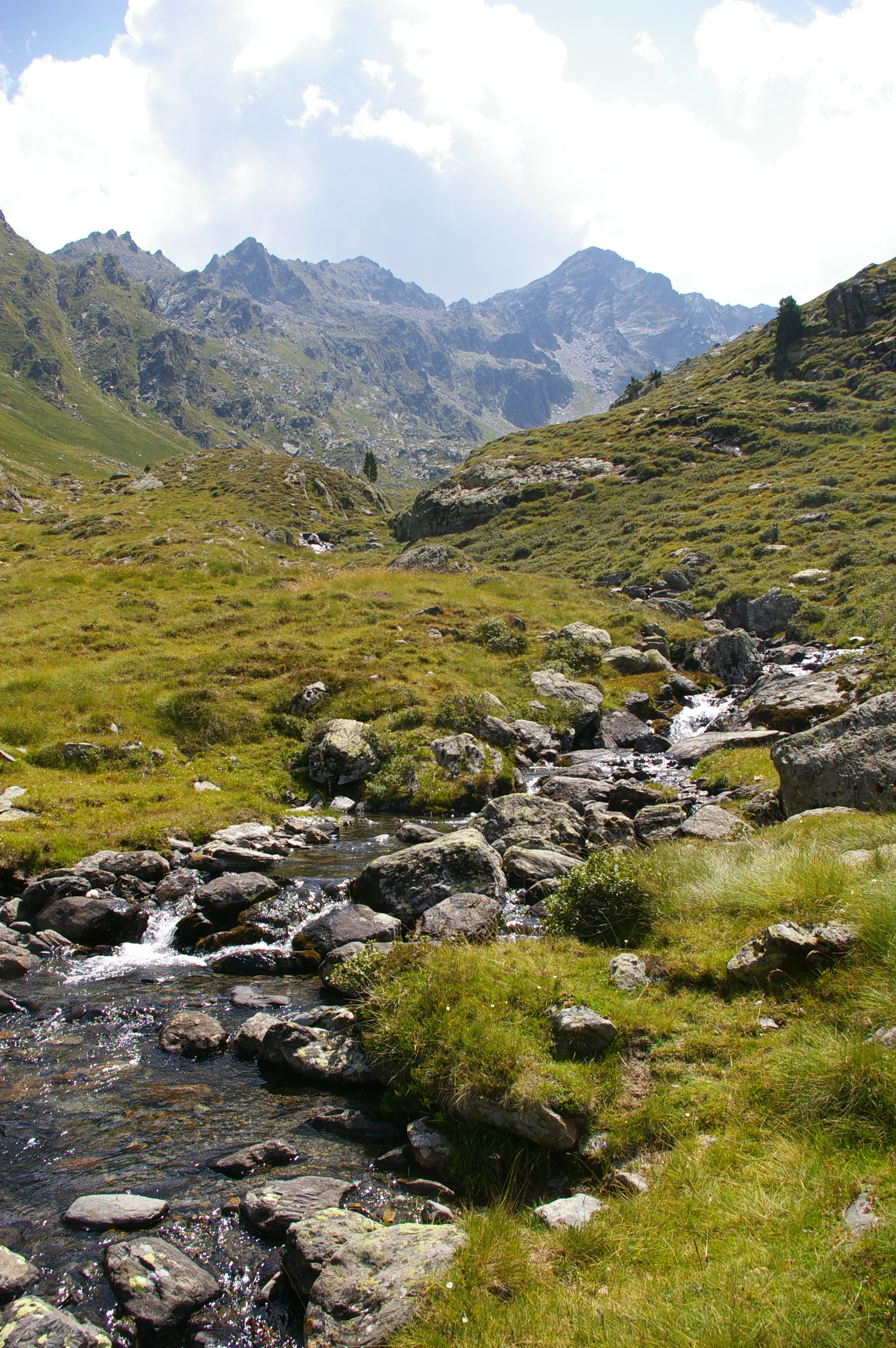
Auzat south of the Etang de Soulcem

- Onost had the first group housing in the Middle Ages with the Church of Saint-Vincent of Onost mentioned in the 11th century
- Auzat village was founded in the 11th or 12th century. It was a village grouped around the present Rue du Fort and the Rue du Rocher
- 12th-15th centuries: domination by Montreal-de-Sos, castle of the Counts of Foix
- 1907: Construction of the Pechiney Smelter to manufacture ingots and billets of aluminum
- 1908: construction of a central hydroelectric station to supply electricity to the Pechiney smelter
- 1911: opening of the Tramway de Tarascon-sur-Ariège à Auzat
- 1939: The Catastrophe of Izourt - an avalanche that killed 28 people
- 1990: Implementation of the Montcalm Water Company
- 2003: closure of the Pechiney smelter
- 2007: Opening of the House of heritage
- 2011: a new athletics stadium was inaugurated in the presence of President of the FFA, Bernard Amsalem

== Administration ==
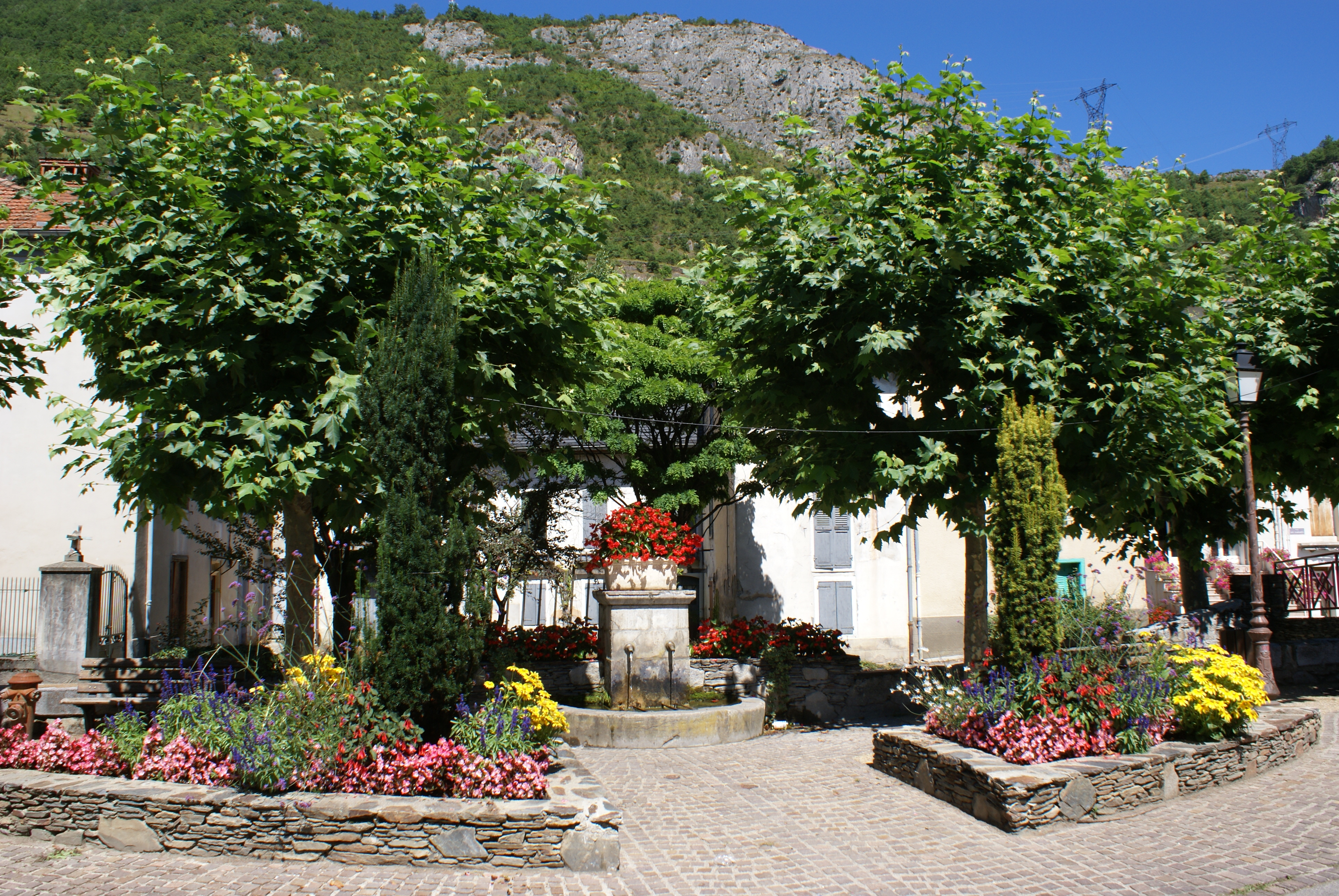
Auzat Fountain

List of Successive Mayors

From	To	Name	Party	Position
1867	1871	Victorin Galy		General Councillor
1985	2014	Bernard Piquemal	PS	General Councillor
2014	2020	Jean Pierre Ruffé		President of the Community of Communes
2020	2026	Abdel El Yacoubi		

=== Twinning ===
Since 2003, the Auzat valley and Vicdessos have developed special links with Italy, especially with the Veneto and Friuli regions which were the origins of the victims of the Izourt Dam disaster in Auzat that had resulted in the deaths of 29 Italians and 3 Frenchmen on 24 March 1939. The Ricordate Association, with the support of elected officials, regularly organizes events and commemorations for the victims' families to honour their dead and to better understand the circumstances of the accident.

== Demography ==
The inhabitants of the commune are known as Auzatois or Auzatoises in French.

Historical population

Year	Pop.	±% p.a.
1793	1,255	—
1800	1,364	+1.20%
1806	1,867	+5.37%
1821	1,750	−0.43%
1831	1,875	+0.69%
1836	1,774	−1.10%
1841	1,745	−0.33%
1846	1,749	+0.05%
1851	1,693	−0.65%
1856	1,643	−0.60%
1861	1,615	−0.34%
1866	1,519	−1.22%
1872	1,435	−0.94%
1876	1,330	−1.88%
1881	1,154	−2.80%
1886	1,261	+1.79%
1891	1,273	+0.19%
1896	1,064	−3.52%
1901	1,117	+0.98%

Year	Pop.	±% p.a.
1906	1,049	−1.25%
1911	1,268	+3.86%
1921	997	−2.38%
1926	1,012	+0.30%
1931	952	−1.21%
1936	778	−3.96%
1946	1,383	+5.92%
1954	1,068	−3.18%
1962	970	−1.20%
1968	949	−0.36%
1975	798	−2.45%
1982	847	+0.85%
1990	760	−1.35%
1999	666	−1.46%
2007	605	−1.19%
2012	565	−1.36%
2017	488	−2.89%
2023	561	+2.35%

Source: EHESS and INSEE

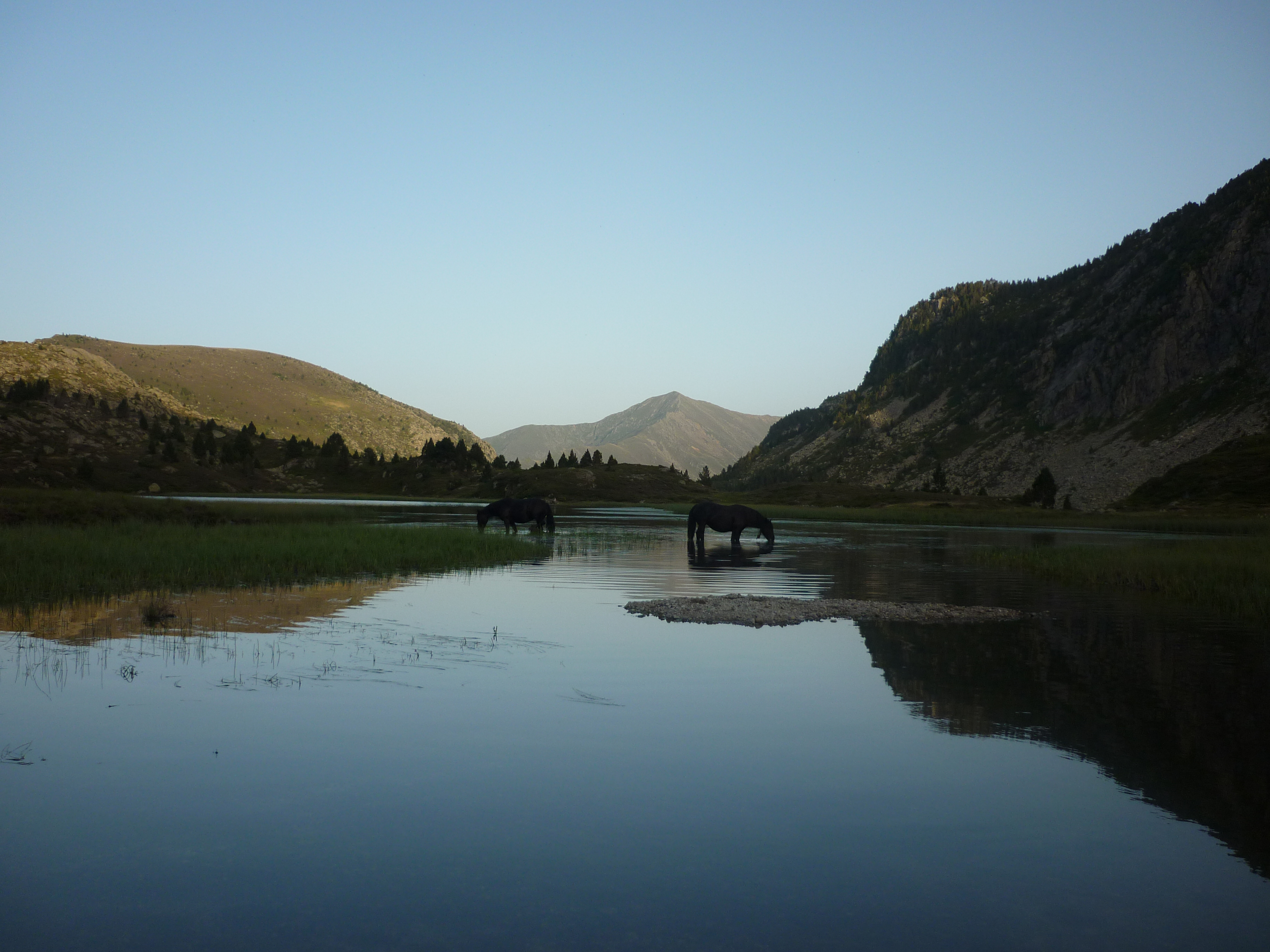
The Etang de Bassiès

== Culture and heritage ==
=== Civil heritage ===
- The Chateau of Montreal-de-Sos is located on a rocky escarpment overlooking the hamlet of Olbier
- The Vicdessos Valley
- The Vicdessos Lakes
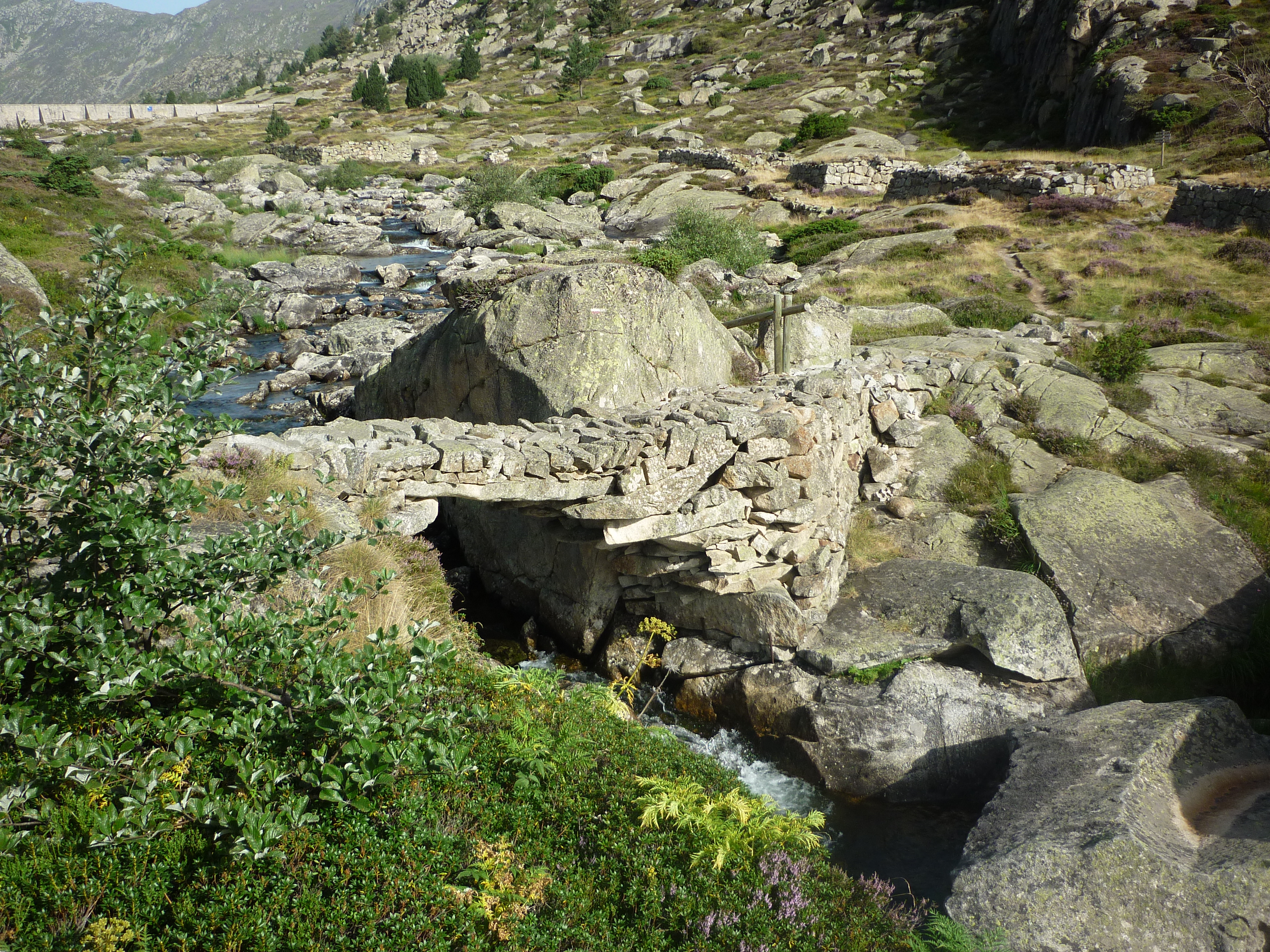
A bridge on the GR 10 across the Ruisseau de Bassiès at 1590m

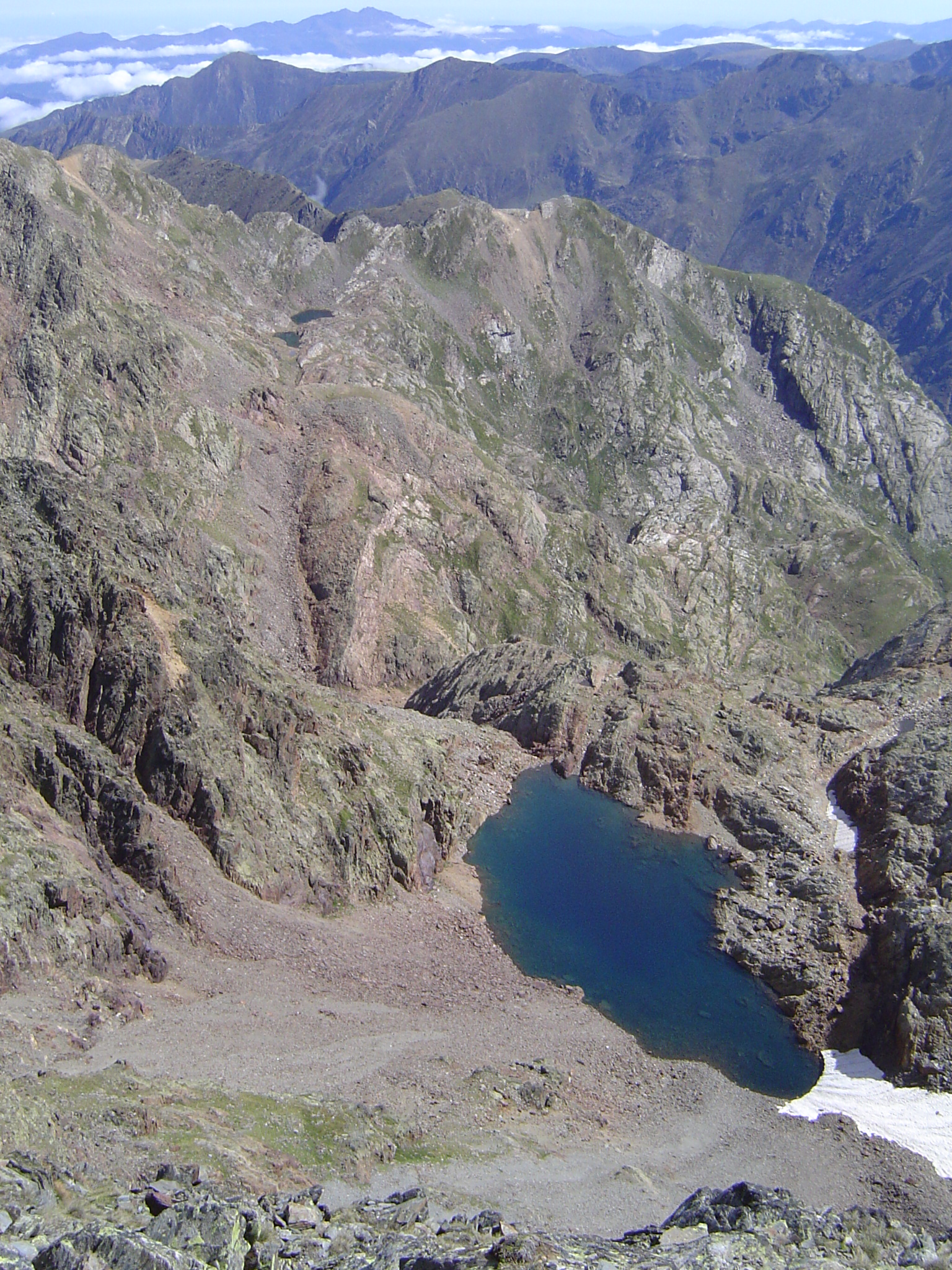
The Etang de Canalbonne

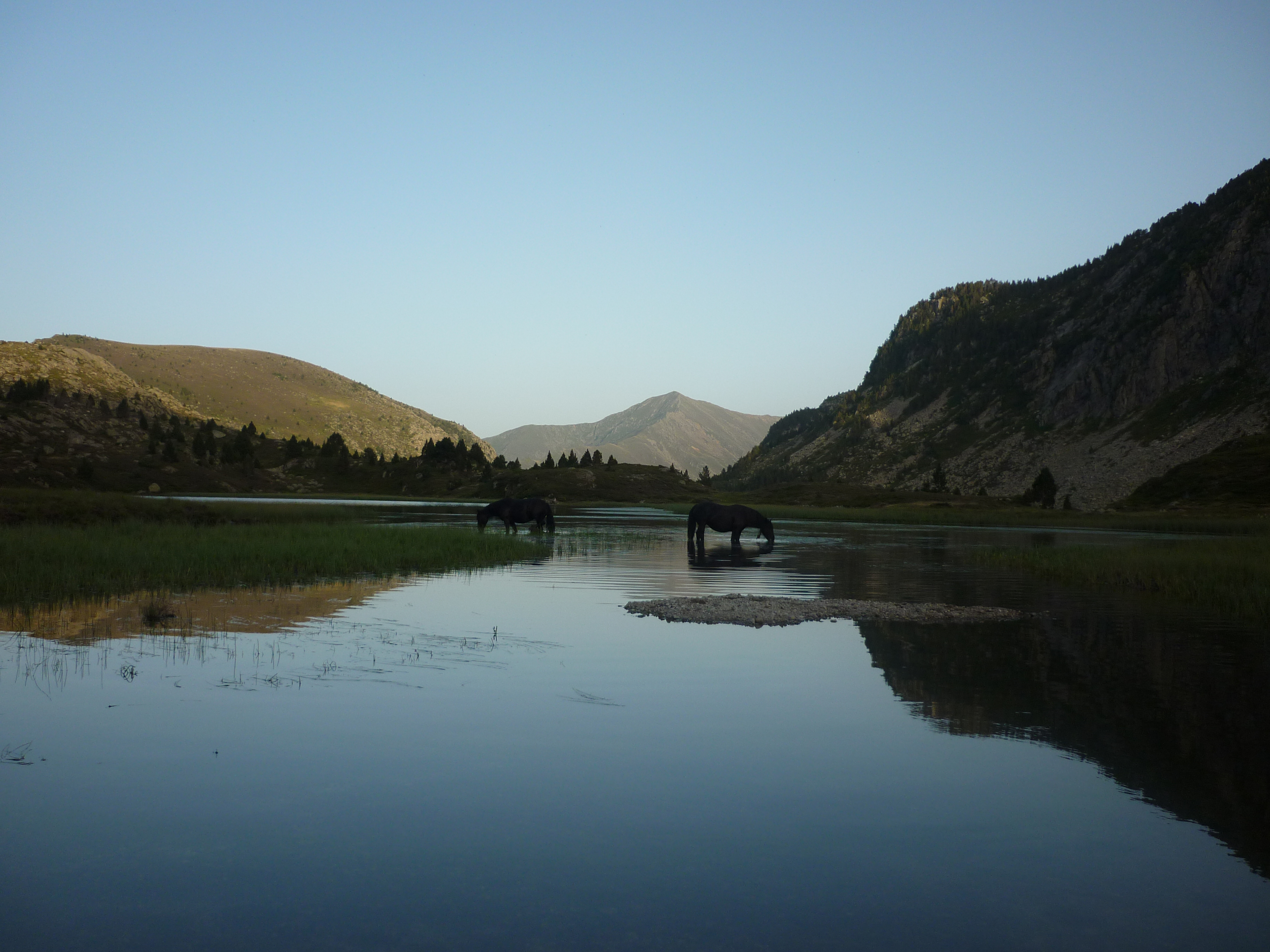
The Etang de Bassiès and Mérens horses

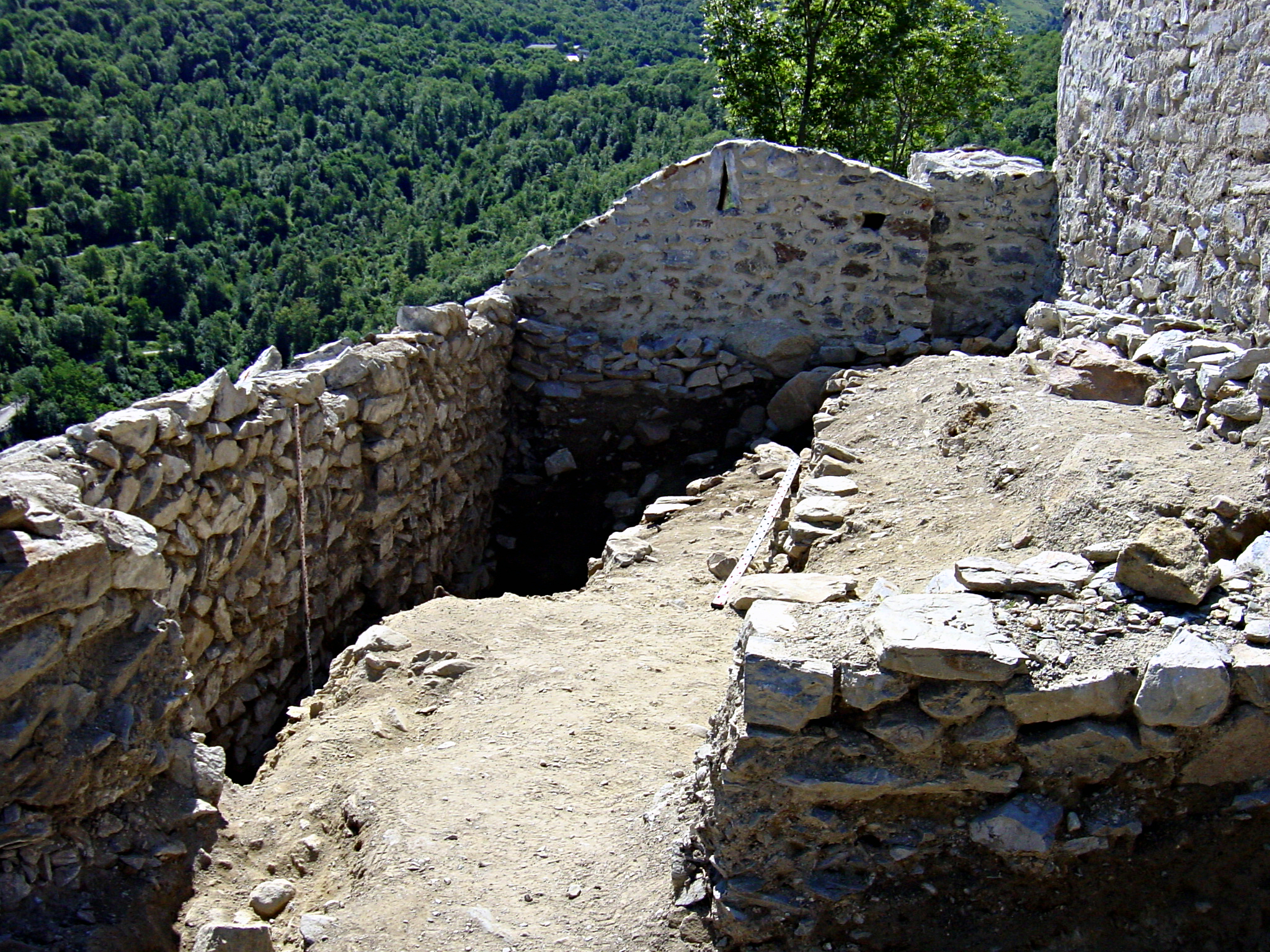
Inside the Chateau of Montreal-de-Sos

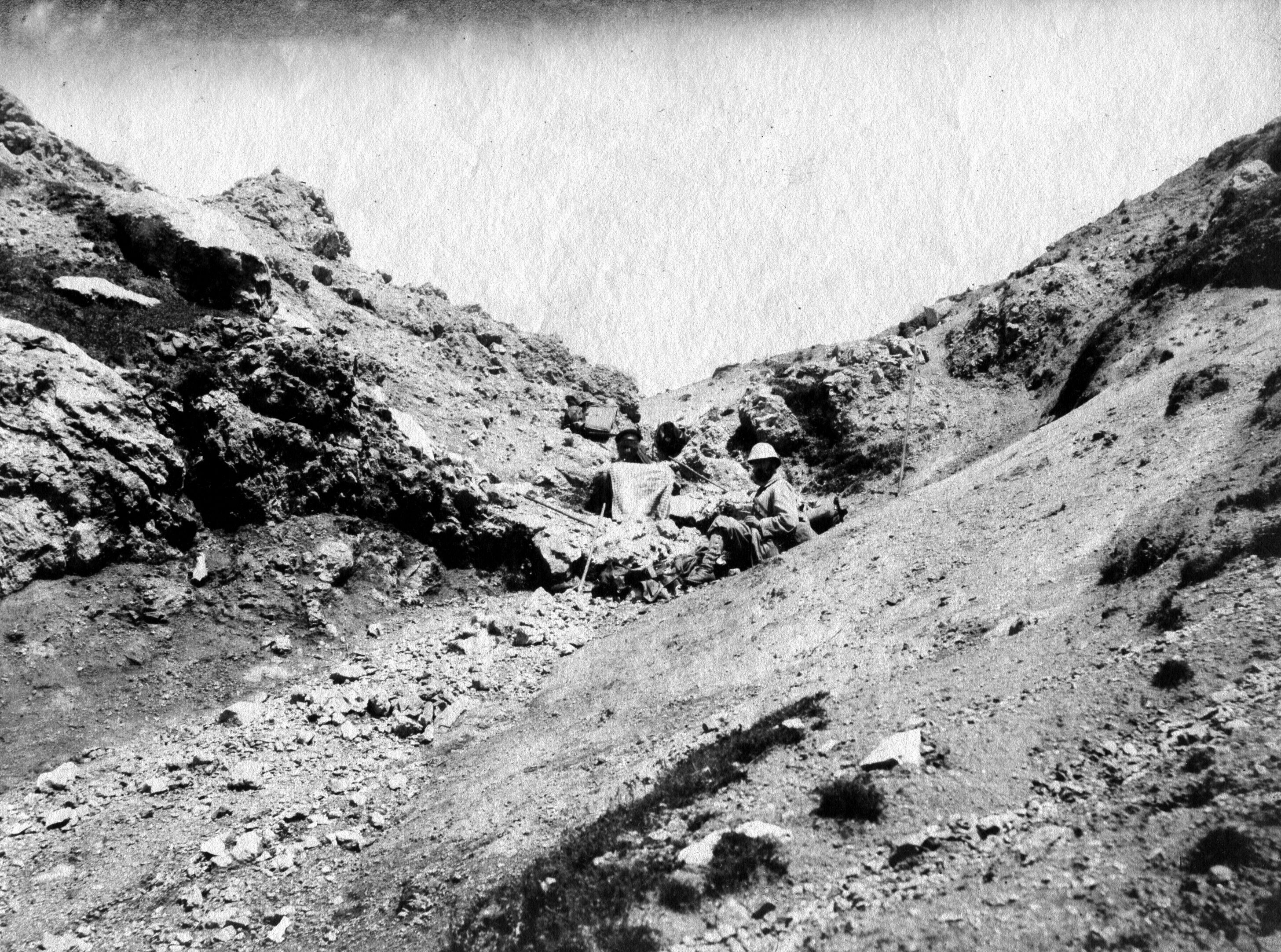
The Col du Saleich in 1882

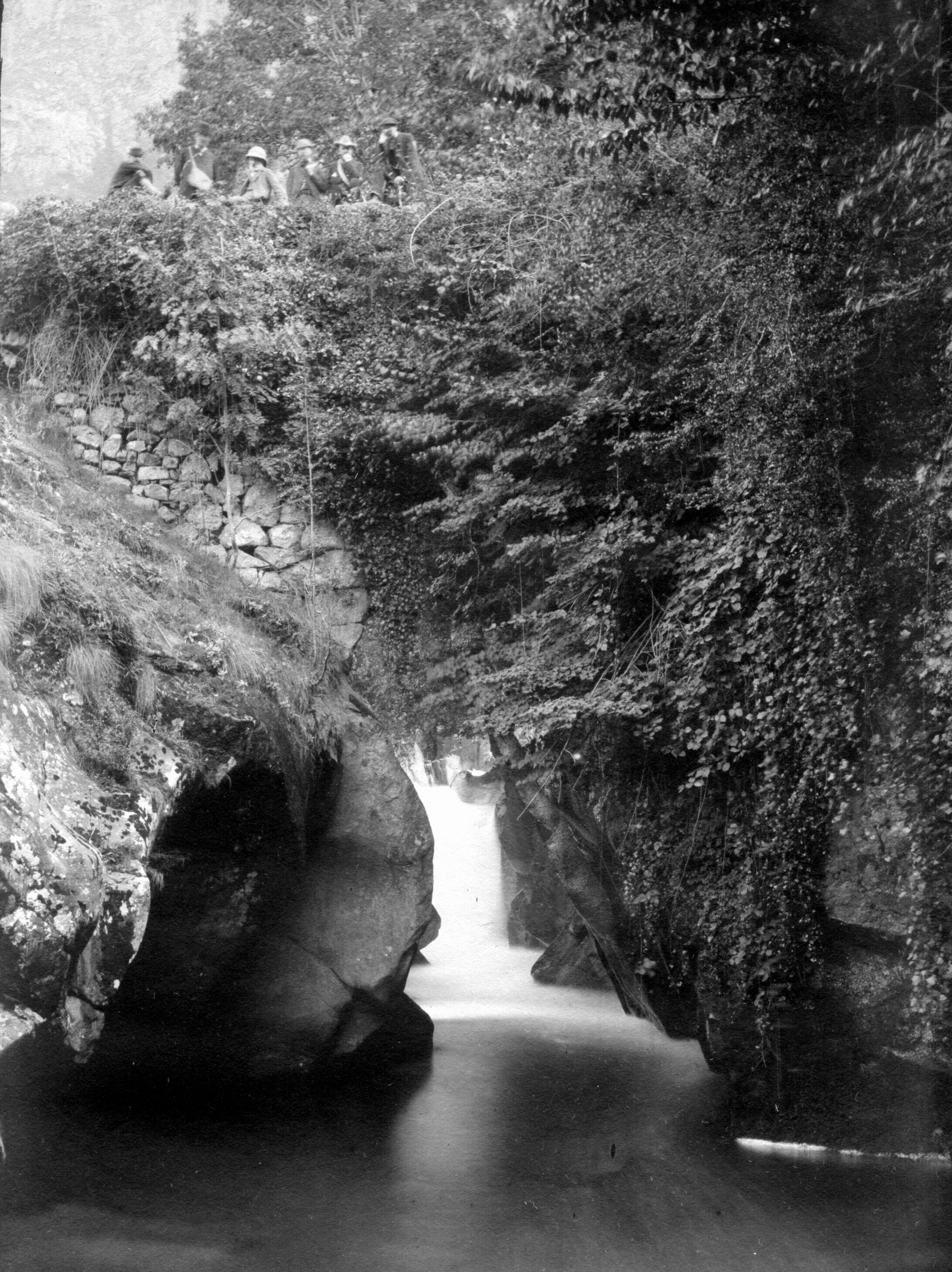
Auzat Bridge in 1882

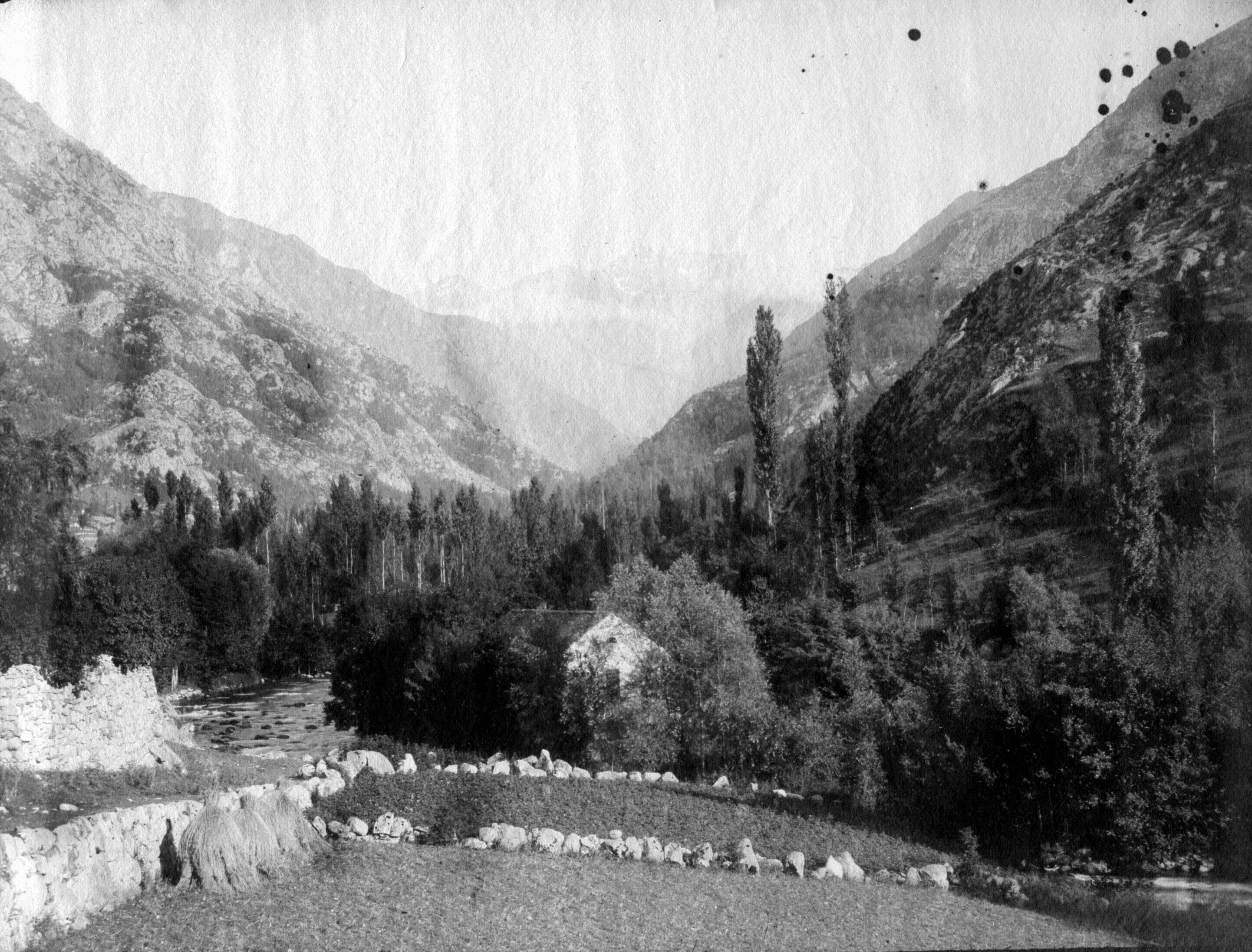
Mont Calm in 1882

=== Religious heritage ===
The commune has several religious buildings:

- The Cemetery Chapel has a Statue of Saint Bartholomew (15th century) which is registered as an historical object
- The Church of Auxat has three items that are registered as historical objects:
  - A Chandelier (19th century)
  - A Ciborium (19th century)
  - A Monstrance (19th century)
- The Church of Olbier has one item that is registered as an historical object:
  - A Collection Plate (16th century)
- The Church of Saleix has many items that are registered as historical objects:
  - A Chalice (17th century)
  - A Tabernacle (18th century)
  - 2 Statues: Virgin and Child, Saint Joseph (18th century)
  - Group sculpture: Virgin of Pity (16th century)
  - A Collection Plate: the Annunciation (16th century)
  - A Collection Plate: Adam and Eve (16th century)
  - 2 Statues: Saint Roch, Saint John (18th century)
  - A Chandelier (19th century)

== Notable people linked to the commune ==
- Jean Sérafin, footballer

== See also ==
- Communes of the Ariège department
