= Rodó de Canalbona =

Mountain in France

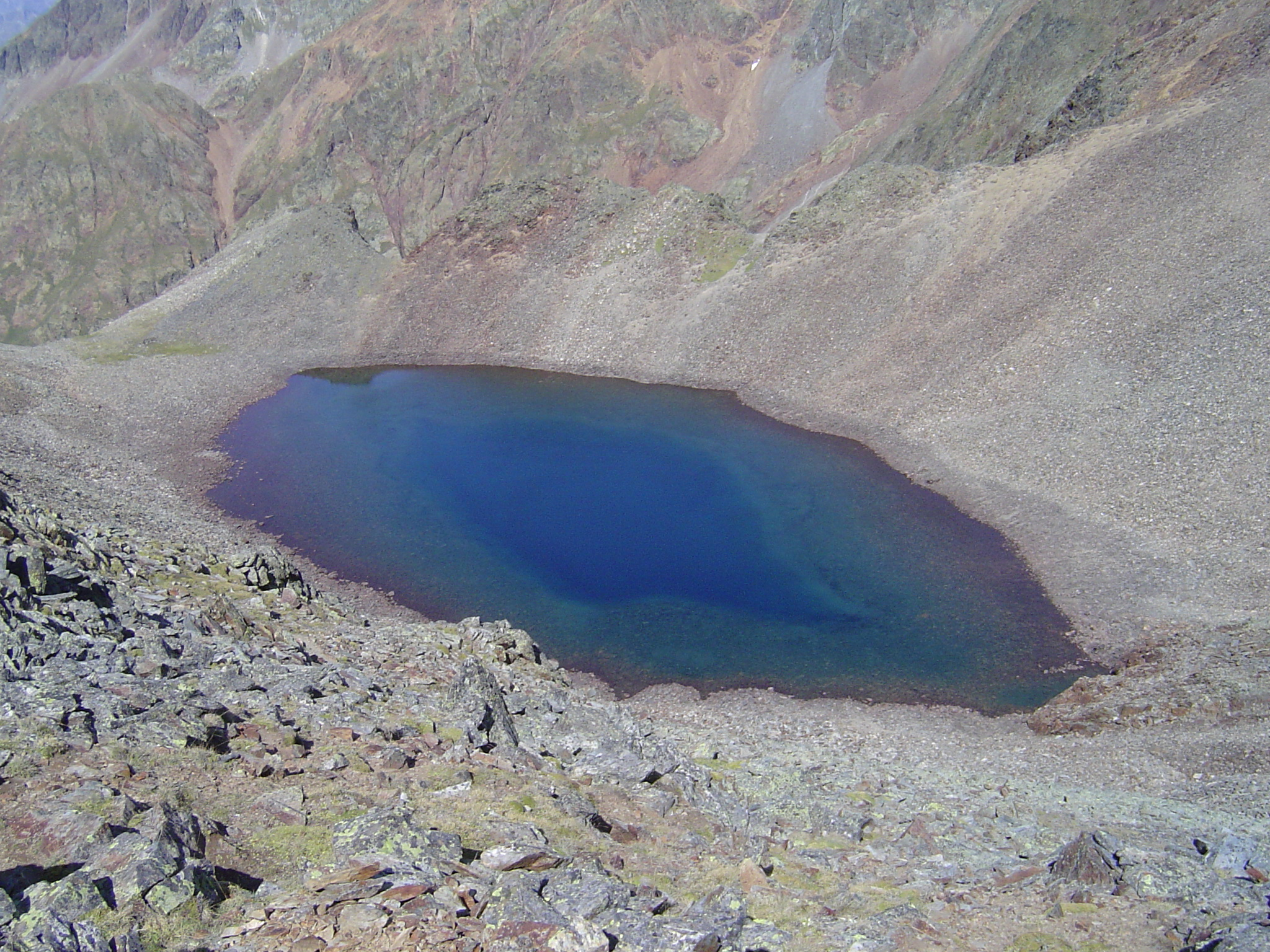
- The Estany de Canalbona located near the peak

Highest point
- Elevation: 3,004 m (9,856 ft)
- Prominence: 19 m (62 ft)
- Listing: Mountains in Catalonia
- Coordinates: 42°39′45.19″N 1°24′6.194″E

Geography
- Location within Pyrenees
- Location: Ariège, France; Pallars Sobirà, Spain
- Parent range: Montcalm Massif, Pyrenees

Geology
- Mountain type: Granite

Climbing
- First ascent: Unknown
- Easiest route: From the refugi de Vallferrera, Alins

Rodó de Canalbona or Pic Rodó de Canalbona is a mountain of Catalonia. Located in the Montcalm Massif, Pyrenees, at the border between France and Spain, it has an altitude of 3,004 metres above sea level.

Mountaineers use a route that goes over the ridge towards Pica d'Estats. It is not an easy ascent.

The Estanyol Occidental de Canalbona or Estany de Canalbona is a small glacial lake located between the Pic de Canalbona and the "Rodó de Canalbona", at the base of the "Collet Fals" in the Montcalm Massif near the "Pica d'Estats". The lake drains towards the Catalan side. The ice usually is totally melted at the end of the summer.

== See also ==
- List of Pyrenean three-thousanders
