= Sem, Ariège =

Part of Val-de-Sos in Occitanie, France

Sem
- Part of Val-de-Sos
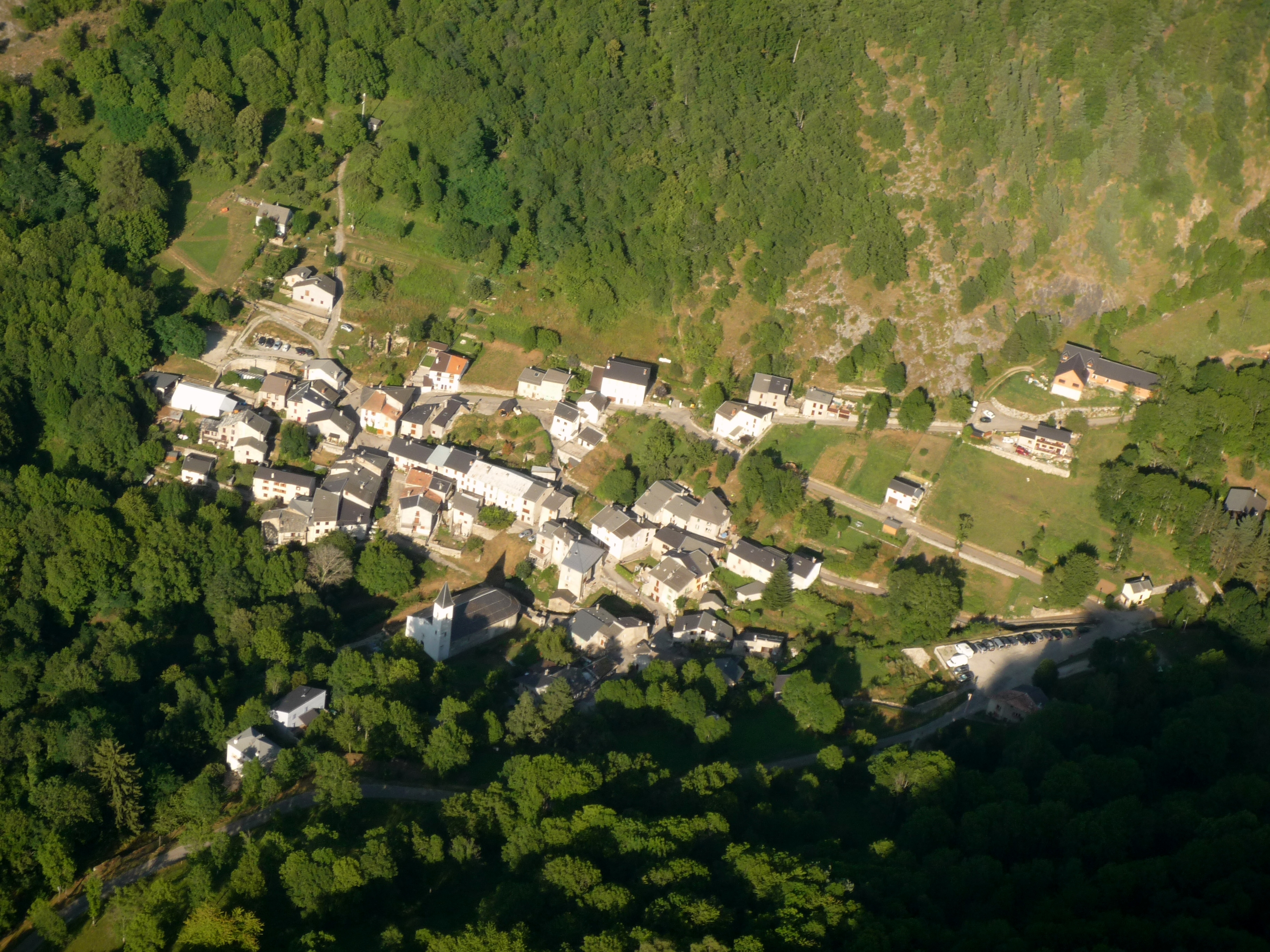
- An aerial view of Sem
- Location of Sem
- Location within France Location within Occitanie
- Coordinates: 42°46′07″N 1°31′11″E
- Country: France
- Region: Occitania
- Department: Ariège
- Arrondissement: Foix
- Canton: Sabarthès
- Commune: Val-de-Sos
- Area^{1}: 5.22 km^{2} (2.02 sq mi)
- Elevation: 960 m (3,150 ft)
- Highest elevation: 2,042 m (6,699 ft)
- Lowest elevation: 825 m (2,707 ft)
- Population (2021): 22
  - Density: 4.2/km^{2} (11/sq mi)
- Time zone: UTC+01:00 (CET)
  - Summer (DST): UTC+02:00 (CEST)
- Postal code: 09220
- ^{1} French Land Register data, which excludes lakes, ponds, glaciers > 1 km^{2} (0.386 sq mi or 247 acres) and river estuaries.

Sem (French pronunciation: [sɛm]) is a former commune in the Ariège department in southwestern France. On 1 January 2019, it was merged into the new commune Val-de-Sos. Inhabitants of Sem are called Sémois in French.

== Geography and sights ==
The Sem village lies in the Vicdessos valley at 991 meters above sea level. It is an old mining village, tied with the history of the iron mining of Rancié. The stream of Sem forms a huge waterfall (Carraoucou waterfall) and a cone. A big rock called "the dolmen" of Sem was made by a former glacier.

== See also ==
- Communes of the Ariège department
