= Val-de-Sos =

Commune in Occitanie, France

- Commune
- Location of Val-de-Sos
- Location within France Location within Occitanie
- Coordinates: 42°46′14″N 1°29′57″E
- Country: France
- Region: Occitania
- Department: Ariège
- Arrondissement: Foix
- Canton: Sabarthès
- Intercommunality: Haute-Ariège

Government
  - Mayor (2020–2026): Marie-José Dandine
- Area^{1}: 53.14 km^{2} (20.52 sq mi)
- Highest elevation: 2,472 m (8,110 ft)
- Lowest elevation: 652 m (2,139 ft)
- Population (2023): 599
  - Density: 11.3/km^{2} (29.2/sq mi)
- Time zone: UTC+01:00 (CET)
  - Summer (DST): UTC+02:00 (CEST)
- INSEE/Postal code: 09334 /09220
- ^{1} French Land Register data, which excludes lakes, ponds, glaciers > 1 km^{2} (0.386 sq mi or 247 acres) and river estuaries.

Val-de-Sos (French pronunciation: [val də sɔs]; Occitan: Val de Sòs) is a commune in the Ariège department in southern France. The municipality was established on 1 January 2019 by merger of the former communes of Vicdessos (the seat), Sem, Goulier and Suc-et-Sentenac.

== Geography ==
=== Location ===
The commune is structured by the Vicdessos valley, irrigated by the eponymous river, in the historic territory of Sabarthès. The main access road is the D8 from Tarascon-sur-Ariège.

It is part of the Ariège Pyrenees Regional Nature Park.

== See also ==
- Communes of the Ariège department
