= Punta Gabarró =

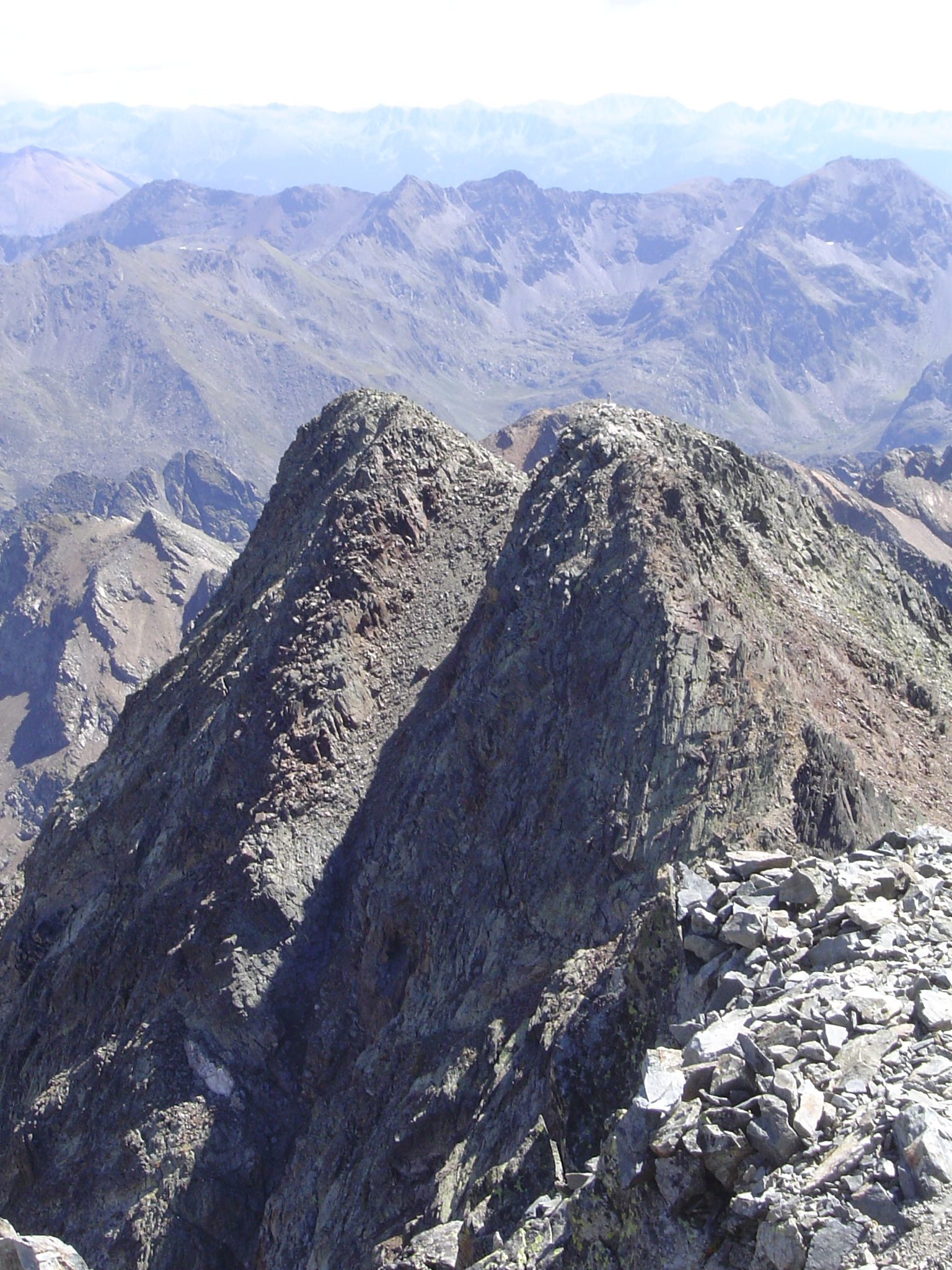
- Punta Gabarró seen from Pica d'Estats

Highest point
- Elevation: 3,105 m (10,187 ft)
- Prominence: 25 m (82 ft)
- Coordinates: 42°40′4.919″N 1°23′48.75″E

Geography
- Location within Pyrenees
- Location: Ariège, France; Pallars Sobirà, Spain
- Parent range: Montcalm Massif, Pyrenees

Geology
- Mountain type: Granite

Climbing
- First ascent: Unknown
- Easiest route: From Vallferrera, Alins

Punta Gabarró or Punta de Gabarró is a mountain of the Montcalm Massif. Located in the Pyrenees, at the border between France and Spain, it has an elevation of 3,105 metres (10,187 ft) above sea level.

This peak was named after Pere Gabarró i Garcia, a Catalan mountaineer who found a new route to climb the Pica d'Estats.

This mountain is included in the Parc Natural de l'Alt Pirineu together with Pica d'Estats and Pic Verdaguer.

== See also ==
- List of Pyrenean three-thousanders
- List of mountains in Catalonia
