= Suc-et-Sentenac =

Part of Val-de-Sos in Occitanie, France

- Part of Val-de-Sos
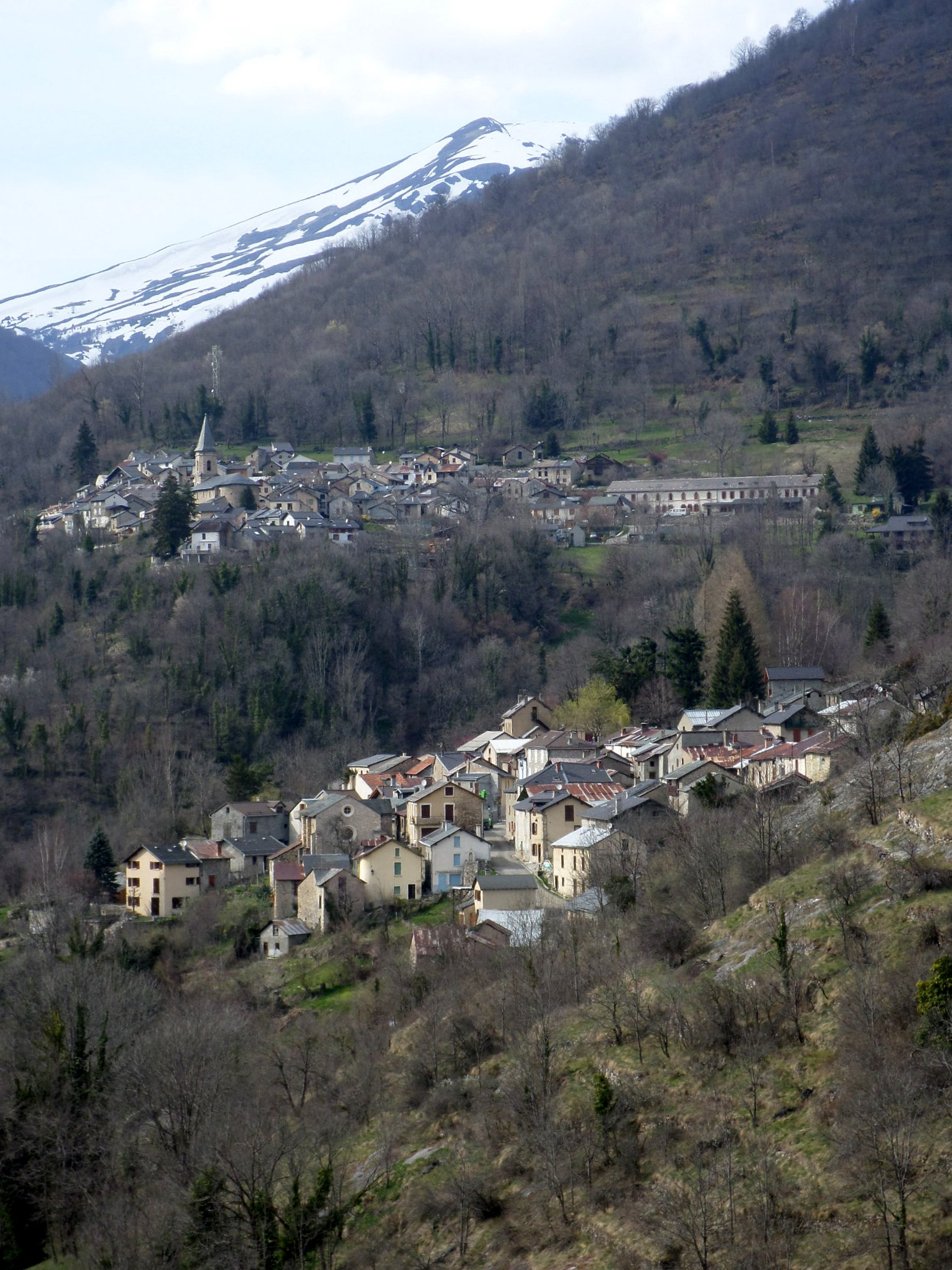
- A general view of Suc-et-Sentenac
- Location of Suc-et-Sentenac
- Location within France Location within Occitanie
- Coordinates: 42°47′00″N 1°28′36″E
- Country: France
- Region: Occitania
- Department: Ariège
- Arrondissement: Foix
- Canton: Sabarthès
- Commune: Val-de-Sos
- Area^{1}: 31.69 km^{2} (12.24 sq mi)
- Elevation: 1,000 m (3,300 ft)
- Highest elevation: 2,196 m (7,205 ft)
- Lowest elevation: 752 m (2,467 ft)
- Population (2021): 53
  - Density: 1.7/km^{2} (4.3/sq mi)
- Time zone: UTC+01:00 (CET)
  - Summer (DST): UTC+02:00 (CEST)
- Postal code: 09220
- ^{1} French Land Register data, which excludes lakes, ponds, glaciers > 1 km^{2} (0.386 sq mi or 247 acres) and river estuaries.

Suc-et-Sentenac (French pronunciation: [syk e sɛ̃tnak]; Occitan: Suc e Sentenac) is a former commune in the Ariège department in southwestern France. On 1 January 2019, it was merged into the new commune Val-de-Sos. Inhabitants of Suc-et-Sentenac are called Sucatels in French.

== See also ==
- Communes of the Ariège department
