= Pic de Sotllo =

Mountain in France and Spain

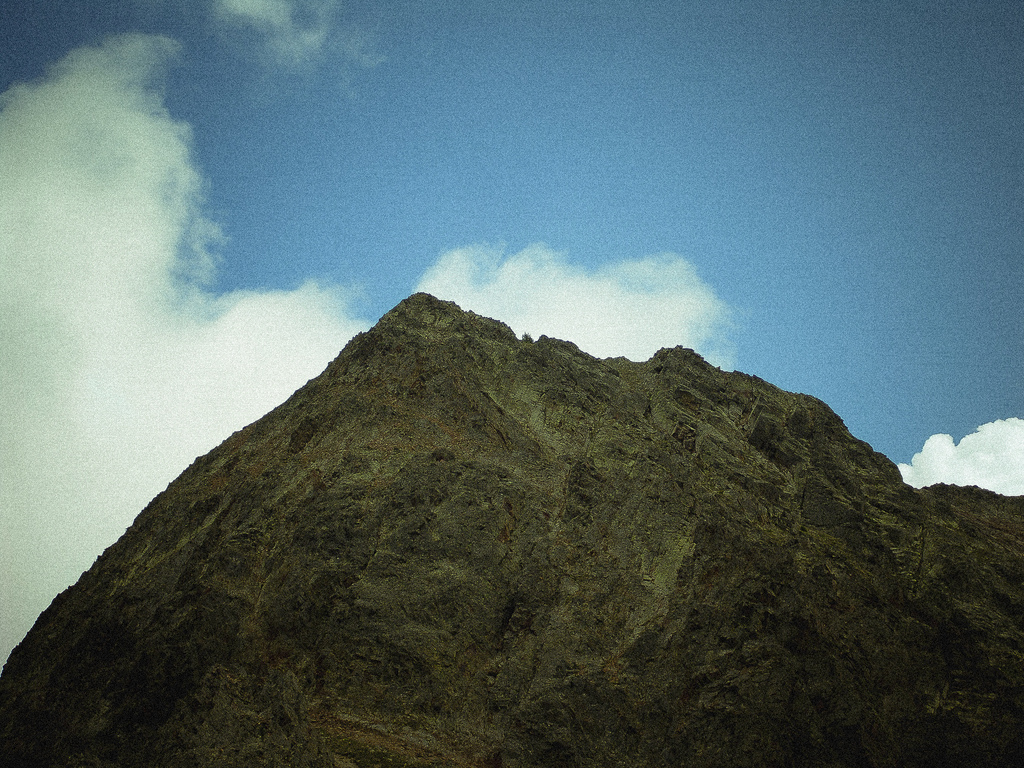

Highest point
- Elevation: 3,072.7 m (10,081 ft)
- Prominence: 198 m (650 ft)
- Coordinates: 42°40′7.297″N 1°23′14.91″E

Geography
- Location within Pyrenees
- Location: Ariège, France; Pallars Sobirà, Spain
- Parent range: Montcalm Massif, Pyrenees

Geology
- Mountain type: Granite

Climbing
- First ascent: Unknown
- Easiest route: From Vallferrera, Alins

Pic de Sotllo (French: Pic du port de Sullo, Occitan: Pic del pòrt de Sollo) is a mountain of the Montcalm Massif. Located in the Pyrenees, at the border between France and Spain, it has an altitude of 3,072 metres (10,079 ft) above sea level.

It shares the name of three nearby ponds (Estanyets de Sotllo).

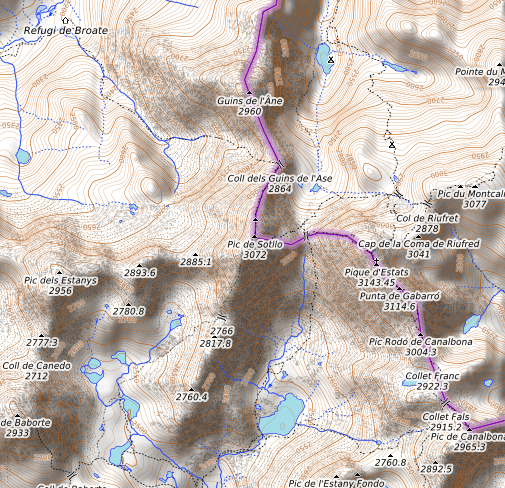
Pic de Sotllo; the Estanyets de Sotllo a quarter of a mile southwest.

== See also ==
- List of Pyrenean three-thousanders
- List of mountains in Catalonia
