= Montcalm Massif =

Mountain massif in the Pyrenees

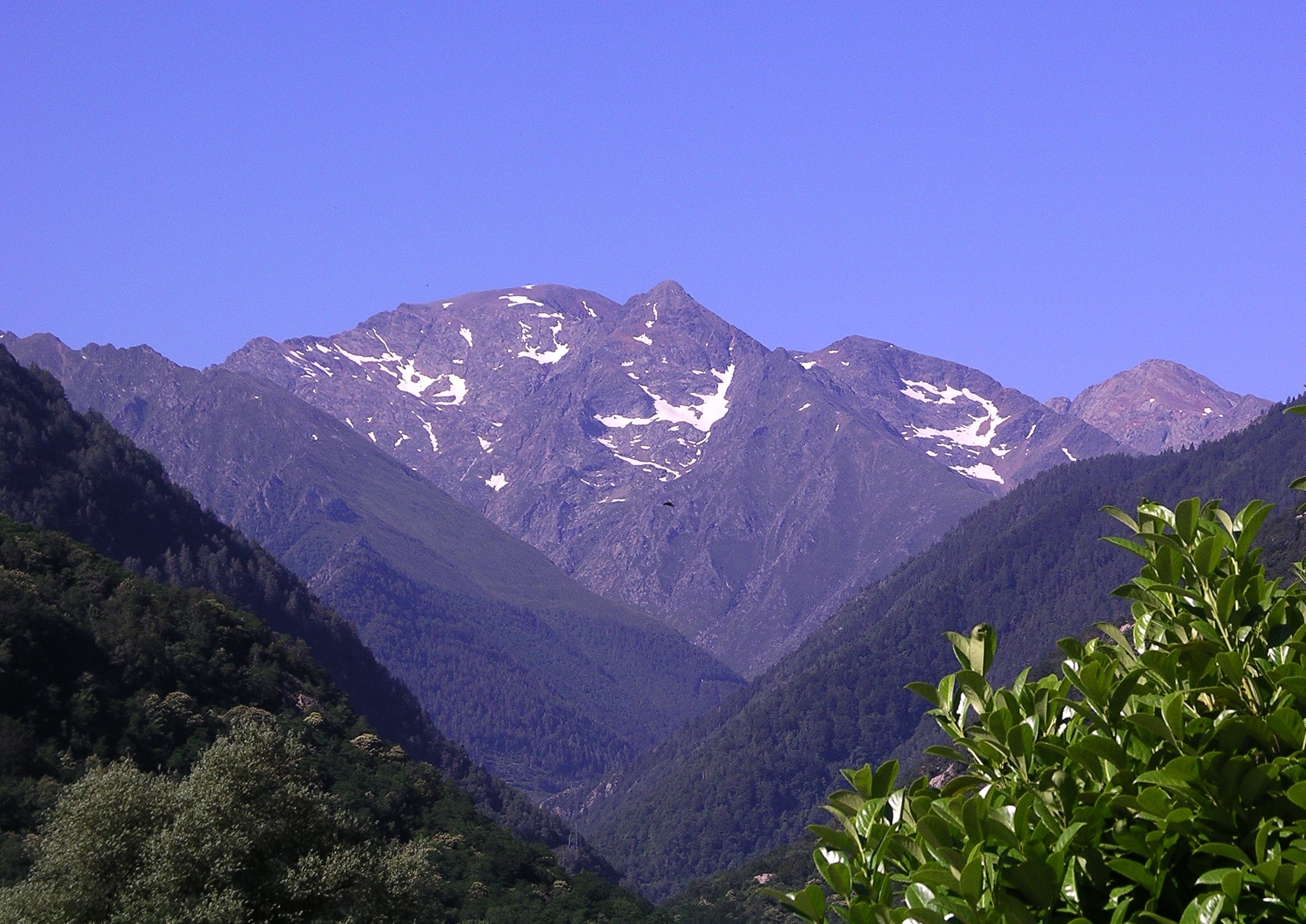
- Pic de Montcalm seen from the Vicdessos valley

Highest point
- Elevation: 3,077 m (10,095 ft)
- Coordinates: 42°40′00″N 1°24′30″E

Geography
- Location within Pyrenees
- Location: Ariège, France; Pallars Sobirà, Spain
- Parent range: Pyrenees

Geology
- Mountain type: Granite

Climbing
- First ascent: Coraboeuf and Testu, 1827
- Easiest route: From Alins or Auzat

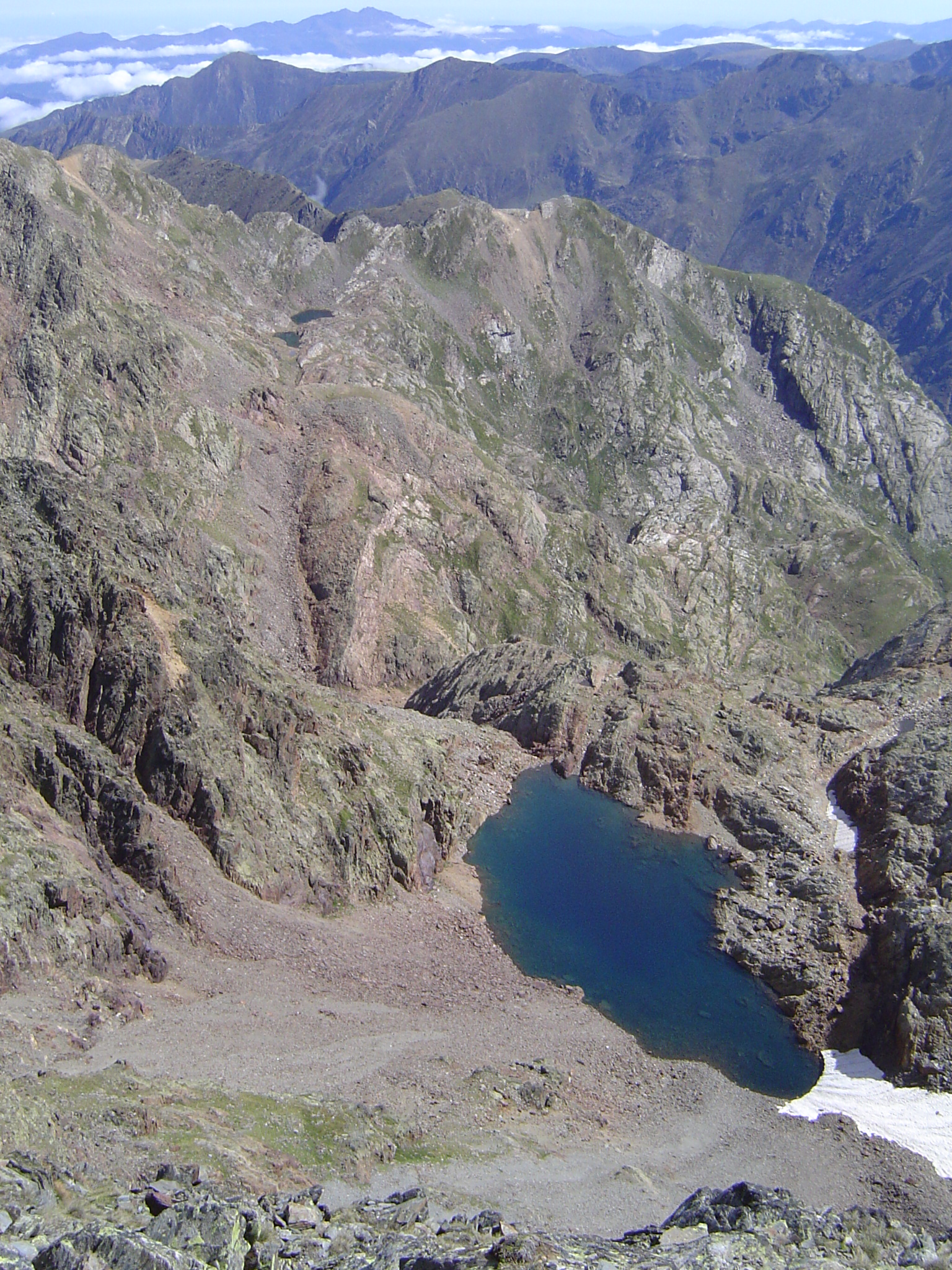
The Estany de Canalbona, located in the massif

The Montcalm Massif (French: Massif du Montcalm, Catalan: Massís del Montcalm) is a mountain massif located in the Pyrenees, at the border between France and Spain, with an altitude of 3077 metres above sea level.

Some of the summits are over 3,000 m high and the highest mountain in Catalonia (Pica d'Estats), as well as the highest mountain in Ariège (Pic de Montcalm), are part of this massif.

== Protected areas ==
The Parc naturel régional des Pyrénées ariégeoises is located on the French side of the massif area and the Parc Natural de l'Alt Pirineu on the Spanish side.

Climbing some of the summits is not easy and there have been occasional accidents involving overconfident mountaineers.

The Estany de Canalbona or Estanyol Occidental de Canalbona is a pristine glacial lake located in the Montcalm Massif between the Pic de Canalbona and the Rodó de Canalbona, at the base of the "Collet Fals" near the "Pica d'Estats". The lake drains towards the Catalan side. The lake stays frozen most of the year, but the ice is usually totally melted at the end of the summer.

== Summits ==
Some of the main summits are:

- Pica d'Estats, 3143 m
- Pic de Montcalm, 3077 m
- Pic de Sotllo or Pic du port de Sullo, 3072 m
- Pic Verdaguer, 3131 m
- Punta Gabarro, 3115 m
- Rodo de Canalbona, 3004 m
- Pic de Canalbona, 2965 m

== See also ==
- Pyrenees
- List of Pyrenean three-thousanders
- Mountains of Catalonia
