= Extreme points of Catalonia =

Catalan Geographical Areas

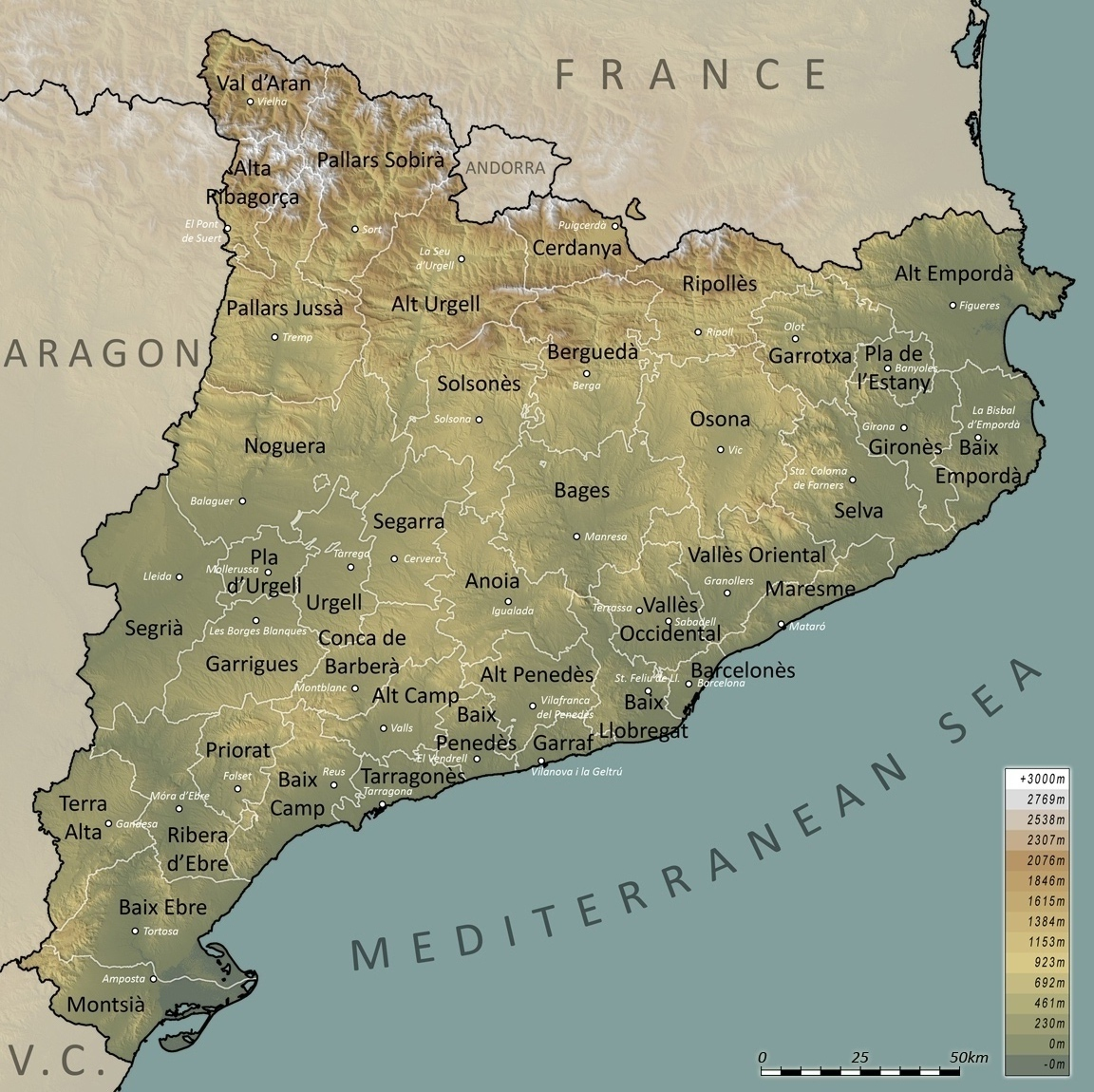
Catalonia map

This is a list of the extreme points of Catalonia, the points that are farther north, south, east or west than any other location, as well as the highest point in the autonomous community.

== Catalonia (points) ==
- Northernmost Point — Tuc de Sacauba, Val d'Aran at 42°51′N 0°42′E
- Southernmost Point — Alcanar, Montsià at 40°31′N 0°30′E
- Westernmost Point — Tossal del Rei, Montsià at 40°44′N 0°9′E
- Easternmost Point — Cap de Creus, Alt Empordà at 42°19′N 3°19′E

== Catalonia (settlements) ==
- Northernmost Settlement — Canejan, Val d'Aran at 42°50′N 0°44′E
- Southernmost Settlement — Alcanar, Montsià at 40°32′N 0°28′E
- Westernmost Settlement — Caseres, Terra Alta at 41°2′N 0°15′E
- Easternmost Settlement — Cadaqués, Alt Empordà at 42°17′N 3°16′E

== Elevation ==
- Highest Point — Pica d'Estats, Pallars Sobirà at 42°40′N 1°23′E
