= Pica d'Estats =

Mountain in Spain

- Pic d'Estats
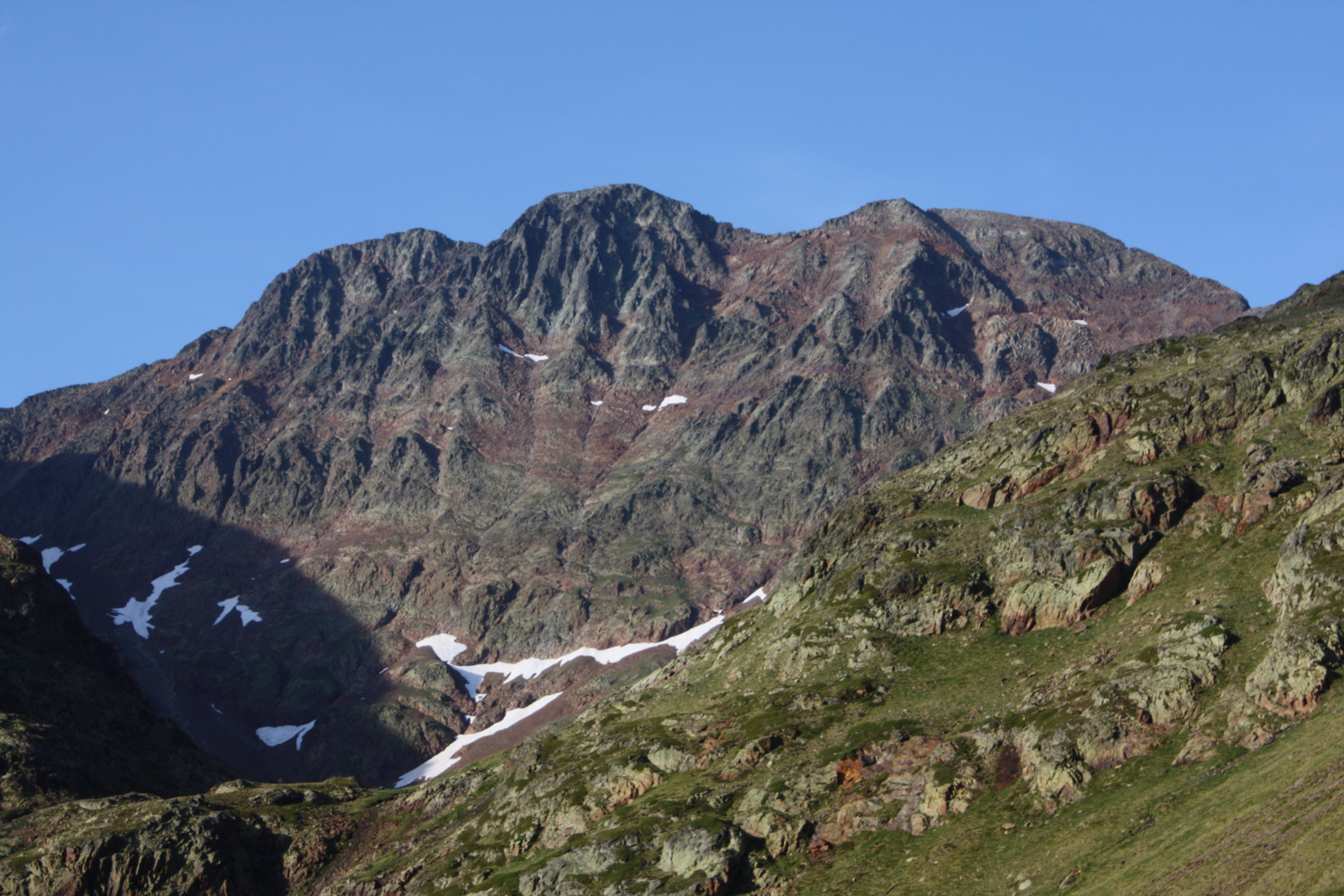

Highest point
- Elevation: 3,143 m (10,312 ft)
- Prominence: 1,275 m (4,183 ft)
- Listing: Ribu
- Coordinates: 42°40′02″N 01°23′50″E

Geography
- Location within Pyrenees
- Location: Pallars Sobirà, Catalonia, Spain; Ariège, Occitania, France
- Parent range: Pyrenees

Climbing
- First ascent: 1864 by Henry Russell and Jean-Jacques Denjean

Pica d'Estats (or The States Peak) (Catalan: Pica d'Estats, French: Pique d'Estats) is a 3,143-metre-high (10,312 ft) mountain in the Montcalm Massif, Pyrenees. on the Spanish–French border, and is the highest mountain in Catalonia.

This mountain is included in the Parc Natural de l'Alt Pirineu.

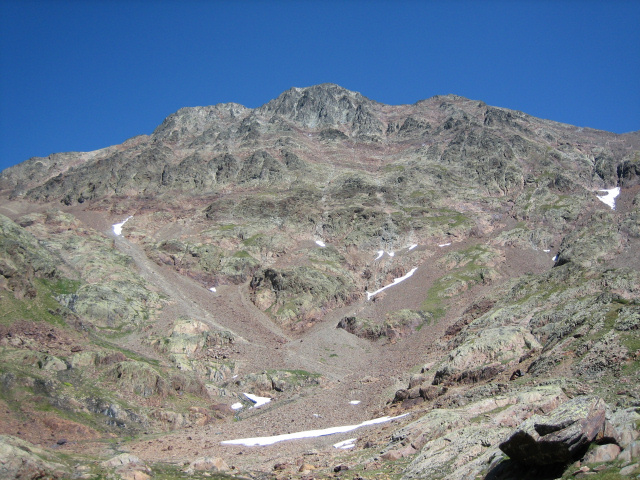
Pica d'Estats, SW face in August 2005

== Summits ==
The summit is located between the Catalan municipality of Alins in Pallars Sobirà and the French district of Ariège. It comprises three peaks, all lying close to each other:

- Central peak (3,143 m)
- Western peak, or Pic de Verdaguer, (3,131 m)
- Eastern peak, or Punta Gabarró, (3,115 m)

This eastern peak is the geodesic vertex. The ridge runs north-northwest to southeast along the Spanish–French border.

== See also ==
- List of Pyrenean three-thousanders
- Pyrenees
- List of mountains in Catalonia
- Extreme points of Catalonia
