= Vicdessos =

Part of Val-de-Sos in Occitanie, France

- Part of Val-de-Sos
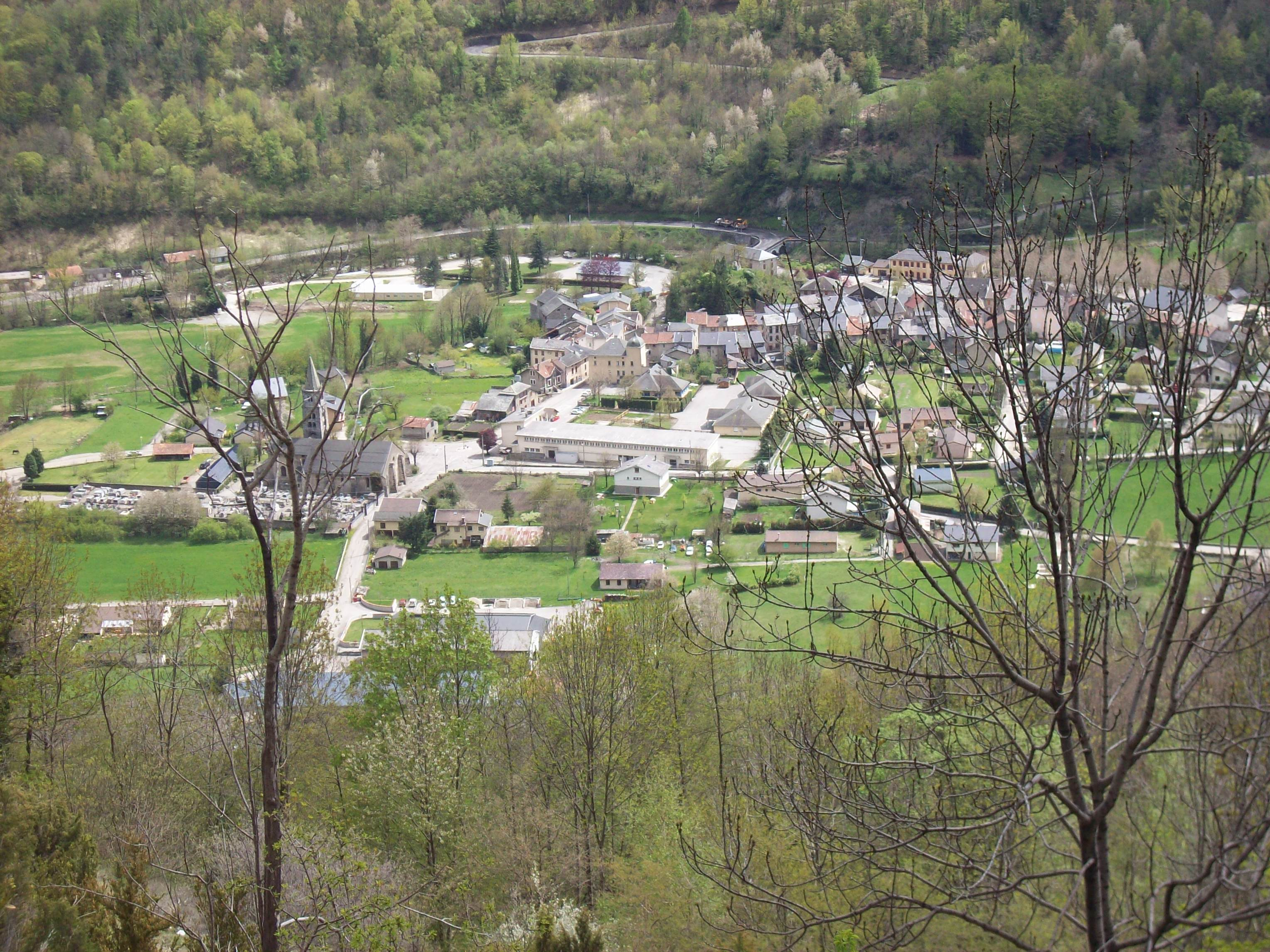
- A general view of Vicdessos

- Coat of arms
- Location of Vicdessos
- Location within France Location within Occitanie
- Coordinates: 42°46′14″N 1°29′57″E
- Country: France
- Region: Occitania
- Department: Ariège
- Arrondissement: Foix
- Canton: Sabarthès
- Commune: Val-de-Sos
- Area^{1}: 6.01 km^{2} (2.32 sq mi)
- Elevation: 705 m (2,313 ft)
- Highest elevation: 1,585 m (5,200 ft)
- Lowest elevation: 652 m (2,139 ft)
- Population (2021): 420
  - Density: 70/km^{2} (180/sq mi)
- Time zone: UTC+01:00 (CET)
  - Summer (DST): UTC+02:00 (CEST)
- Postal code: 09220
- ^{1} French Land Register data, which excludes lakes, ponds, glaciers > 1 km^{2} (0.386 sq mi or 247 acres) and river estuaries.

Vicdessos (French pronunciation: [vikdəso]; Occitan: Vic de Sòs) is a former commune in the Ariège department in southwestern France. On 1 January 2019, it was merged into the new commune Val-de-Sos. Inhabitants of Vicdessos are called Vicdessosiens in French.

== Geography ==
The area of Vicdessos is about 6.01 km2 with a minimum elevation of 652 meters and a maximum elevation of 1585 meters.

=== Location ===
This Pyrenean town lies in the Natural regional park of Pyrenées ariégoises in the Vicdessos valley, at the feet of the Montcalm mountains. Vicdessos is 15 km from Tarascon-sur-Ariège and 95 km from Toulouse.

== See also ==
- Communes of the Ariège department
- Montcalm Massif
