= Alt Pirineu Natural Park =

Protected area in Catalonia, Spain

- Parc Natural de l'Alt Pirineu
- IUCN category V (protected landscape/seascape)
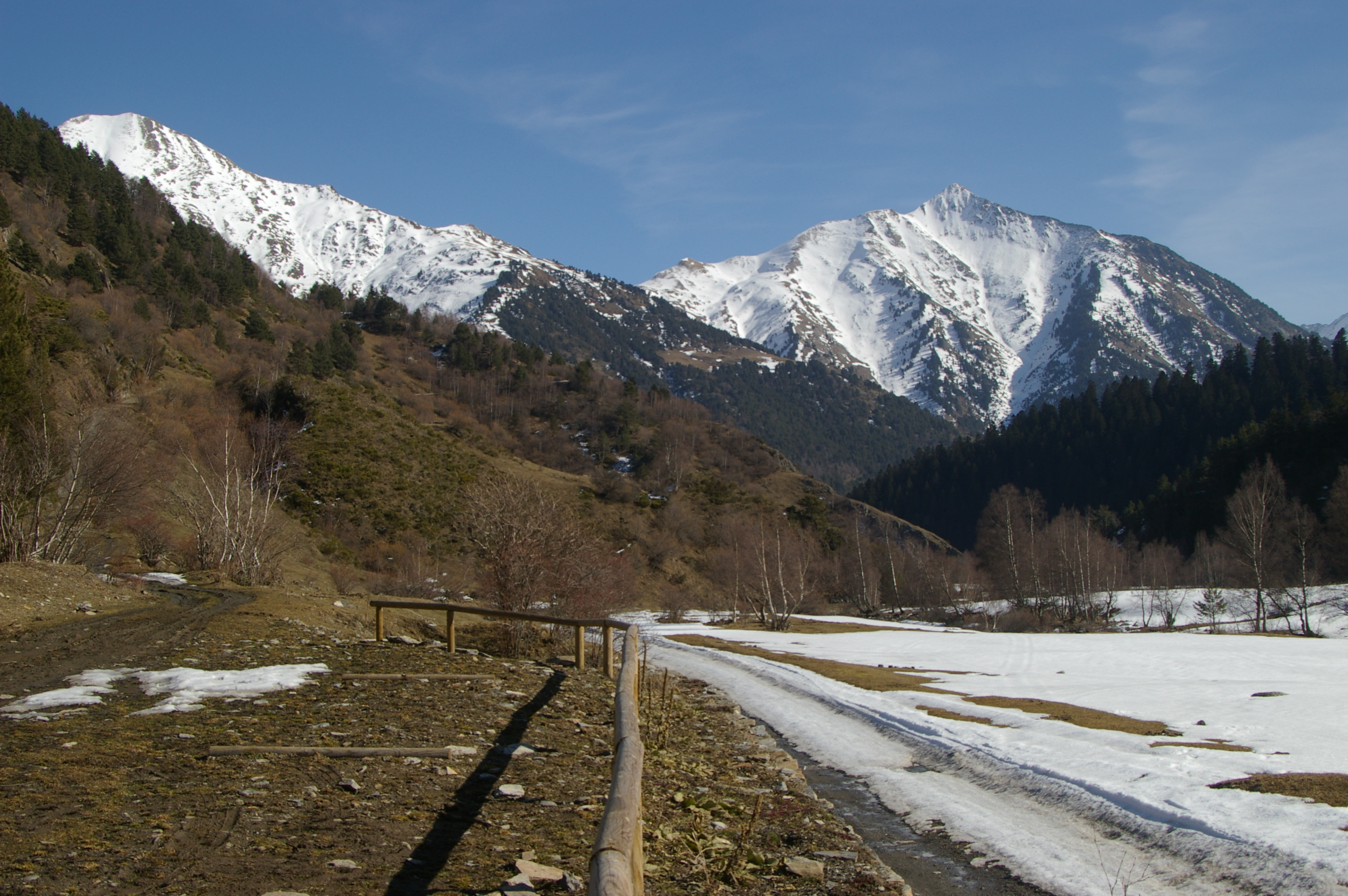

- Location within Catalonia
- Location: Province of Lleida, Catalonia, Spain
- Coordinates: 42°29′46″N 1°12′38″E
- Area: 69,850 hectares (172,600 acres)
- Established: 2003
- Governing body: Generalitat de Catalunya
- Website: www.gencat.cat/parcs/alt_pirineu

Alt Pirineu Natural Park (Catalan: Parc Natural de l'Alt Pirineu) is the largest natural park in Catalonia, Spain. The park was established in 2003 by the Generalitat de Catalunya and covers an area of 69,850 hectares (172,600 acres), including the highest peaks of the Pyrenees in Catalonia. It stretches over the comarques of Pallars Sobirà and Alt Urgell.
