= Roc del Comptador =

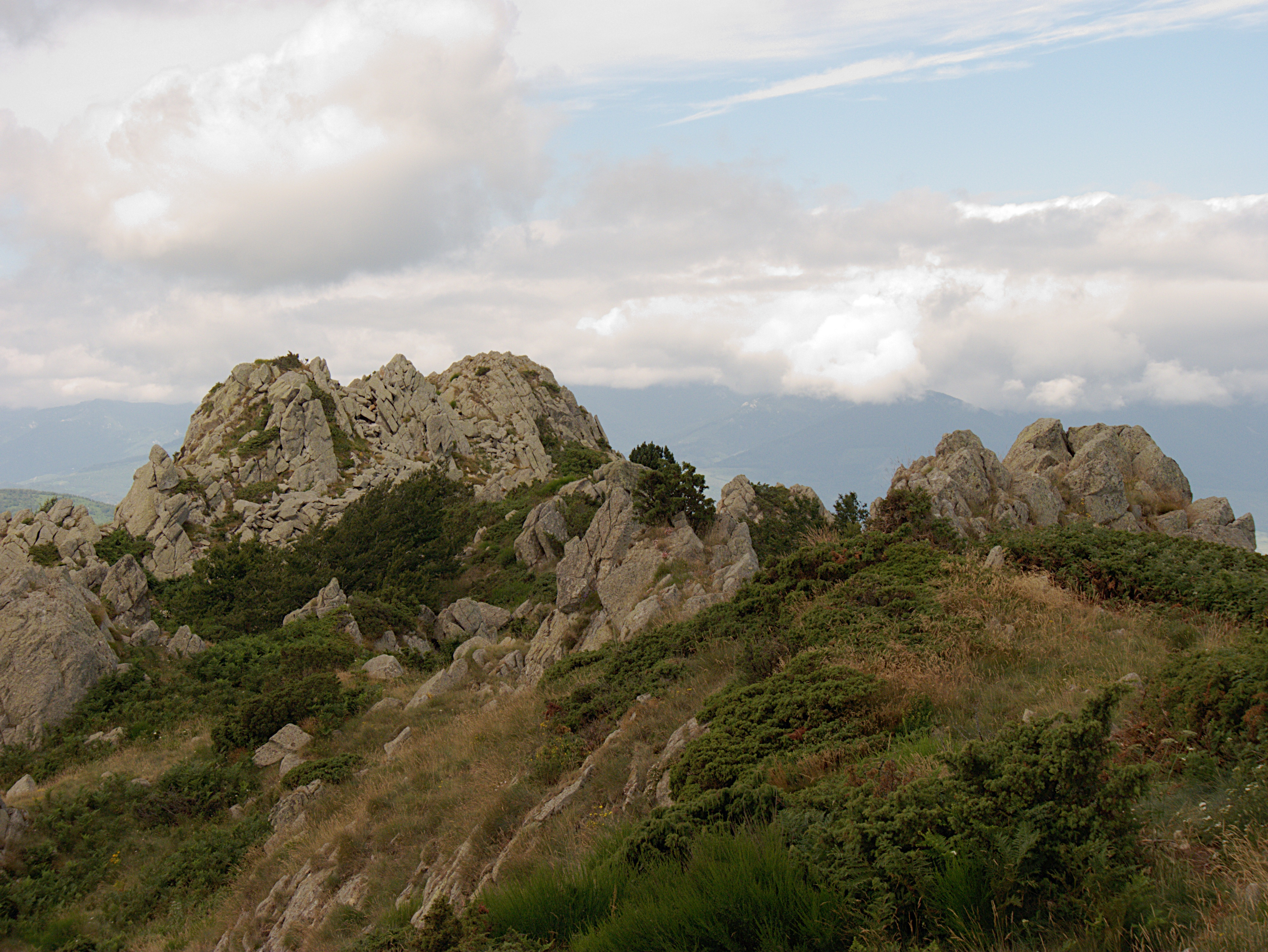

Highest point
- Elevation: 1,451 m (4,760 ft)
- Listing: Mountains of Catalonia
- Coordinates: 42°25′22″N 2°43′38″E

Geography
- Location within Catalonia
- Location: Catalonia, Spain

Roc del Comptador is a mountain of Catalonia, Spain. It has an elevation of 1,451 metres above sea level. Is a peak located between the municipality of Maçanet de Cabrenys in the Alt Empordà region and the commune of Céret in the Vallespir, France.

It is situated near the southwestern end of the municipality of Céret, close to the border with the commune of Reiners, and at the northernmost part of the municipality of Maçanet de Cabrenys. It lies east of the Roc de Fraussa and west of El Moixer.

Standing at 1,451 meters, it is the highest point in the Serra de les Salines and the Alt Empordà region. It is also the highest peak in the entire Empordà area. The French refer to it as Roc de France, though this title is often mistakenly attributed to its neighboring peaks, such as the Roc de Fraussa (1,421 meters) or El Moixer (1,443 meters), which are just a few hundred meters away and more widely known.

This summit is included in the list of the 100 peaks compiled by the FEEC, as well as in several hiking routes through this part of the Pyrenees.

== Bibliography ==
- Becat, Joan (2015). "37 - Ceret". Atles toponímic de Catalunya Nord. I. Aiguatèbia - Montner. Biblioteca de Catalunya Nord, XVIII. Perpinyà: Terra Nostra. ISSN 1243-2032.
- Becat, Joan (2015). "96-Morellàs i les Illes". Atles toponímic de Catalunya Nord. II. Montoriol - el Voló. Biblioteca de Catalunya Nord, XVIII. Perpinyà: Terra Nostra. ISSN 1243-2032.
- Ponsich, Pere; Lloret, Teresa; Gual, Raimon (1985). "Morellàs i les Illes i Ceret". Vallespir, Conflent, Capcir, Baixa Cerdanya, Alta Cerdanya. Gran Geografia Comarcal de Catalunya, 15. Barcelona: Fundació Enciclopèdia Catalana. ISBN 84-85194-60-8.
