= Maçanet =

Maçanet may refer to the following places in Catalonia, Spain:

- Maçanet de Cabrenys, municipality in the comarca of Vallès Oriental
- Maçanet de la Selva, municipality in the comarca of Selva
