= El Moixer =

- El Repetidor
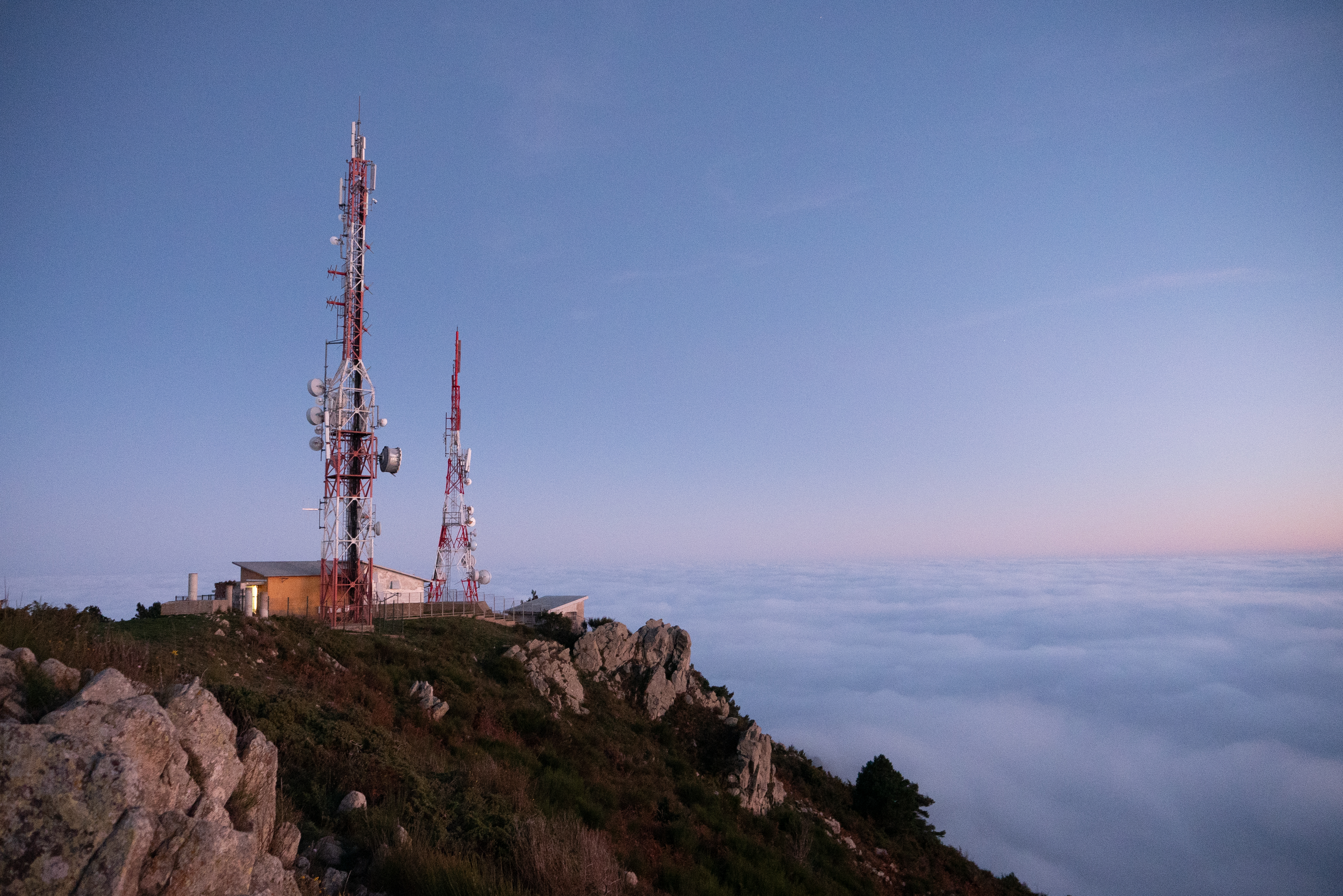
- El Moixer with antennas

Highest point
- Elevation: 1,443 m (4,734 ft)
- Coordinates: 42.422778°N 2.729167°E

Geography
- Location: Maçanet de Cabrenys, Alt Empordà, Girona, Catalonia, Spain

El Moixer is a mountain of Catalonia, Spain. It has an elevation of 1,443 metres above sea level.

Is a peak in the serra de Les Salines, situated between the village of Maçanet de Cabrenys in Alt Empordà and the commune of Céret in Vallespir. It raises to an altitude of 1,443 meters. Locally, it is also known as "El Repetidor" due to the antennas installed at its summit.

It is located at the southern limit of the municipality of Céret and the northern boundary of Maçanet de Cabrenys, near and to the east of the Roc de Fraussa and southwest of Ras Moixer.

This mountain is a popular waypoint for hiking routes in this sector of the Pyrenees.

== See also ==
- Mountains of Catalonia

== Bibliography ==
- Becat, Joan (2015). "37 - Ceret". Atles toponímic de Catalunya Nord. I. Aiguatèbia - Montner. Biblioteca de Catalunya Nord, XVIII. Perpinyà: Terra Nostra. ISSN 1243-2032. OCLC 904395667.
- Ponsich, Pere; Lloret, Teresa; Gual, Raimon (1985). "Morellàs i les Illes i Ceret". Vallespir, Conflent, Capcir, Baixa Cerdanya, Alta Cerdanya. Gran Geografia Comarcal de Catalunya, 15. Barcelona: Fundació Enciclopèdia Catalana. ISBN 84-85194-60-8.

== Notes ==
Translated from: El Moixer (catalan) by Viquipèdia, available at https://ca.wikipedia.org/wiki/El_Moixer
