= Roc de Frausa =

Roc de Fraussa
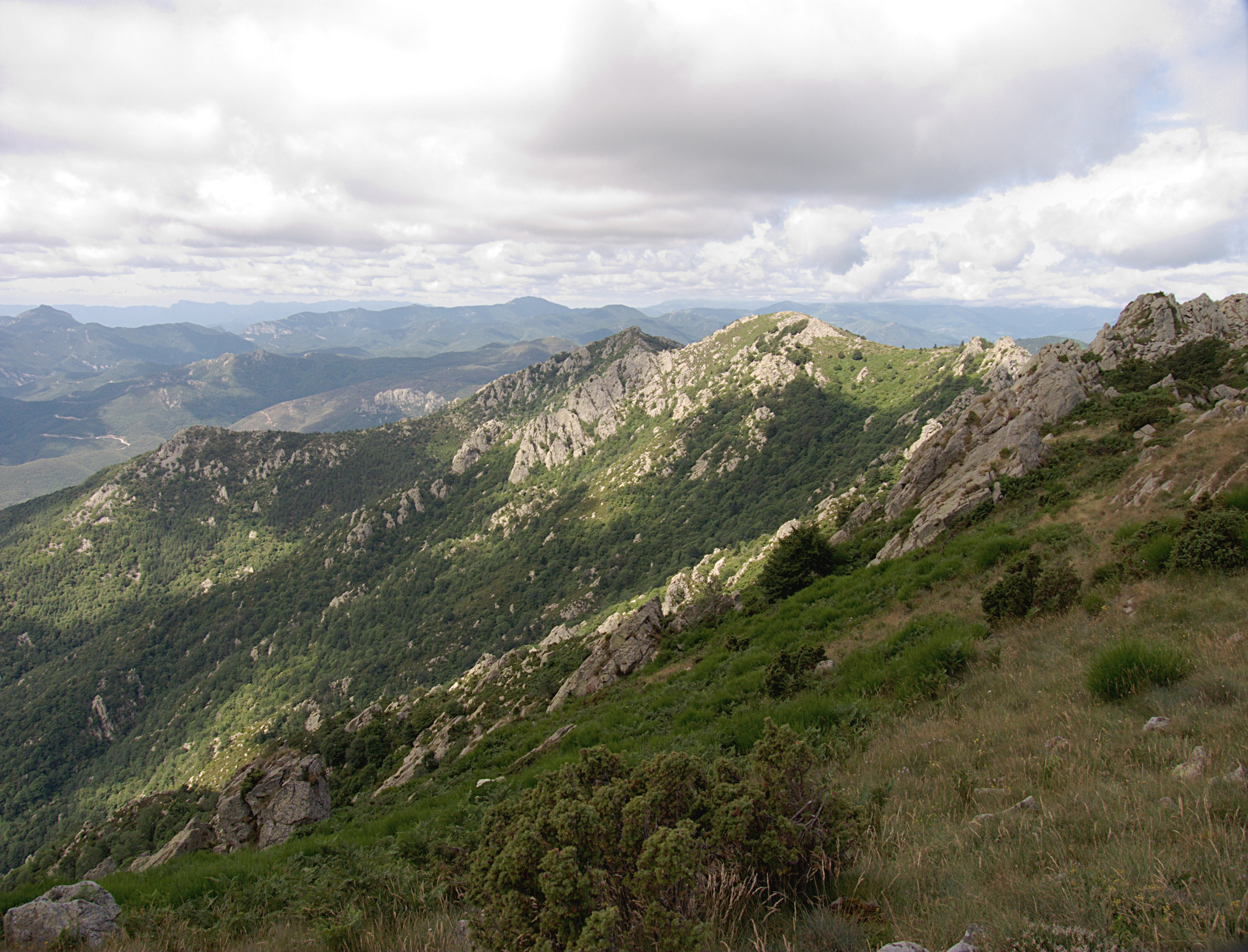

Highest point
- Elevation: 1,421 m (4,662 ft)
- Coordinates: 42°25′22″N 2°43′38″E

Geography
- Location within Spain
- Location: Maçanet de Cabrenys, Alt Empordà, Girona, Catalonia, Spain

Roc de Fraussa, erroneously referred to as Roc de Frausa or Roc de França, is a mountain of Catalonia, Spain located in the Serra de Les Salines. It lies between the municipality of Maçanet de Cabrenys in the Alt Empordà region and the communes of Reiners and Céret in the Vallespir, France. It has an elevation of 1,421 metres above sea level.

== See also ==
- Mountains of Catalonia
