= Maçanet de Cabrenys =

- Municipality
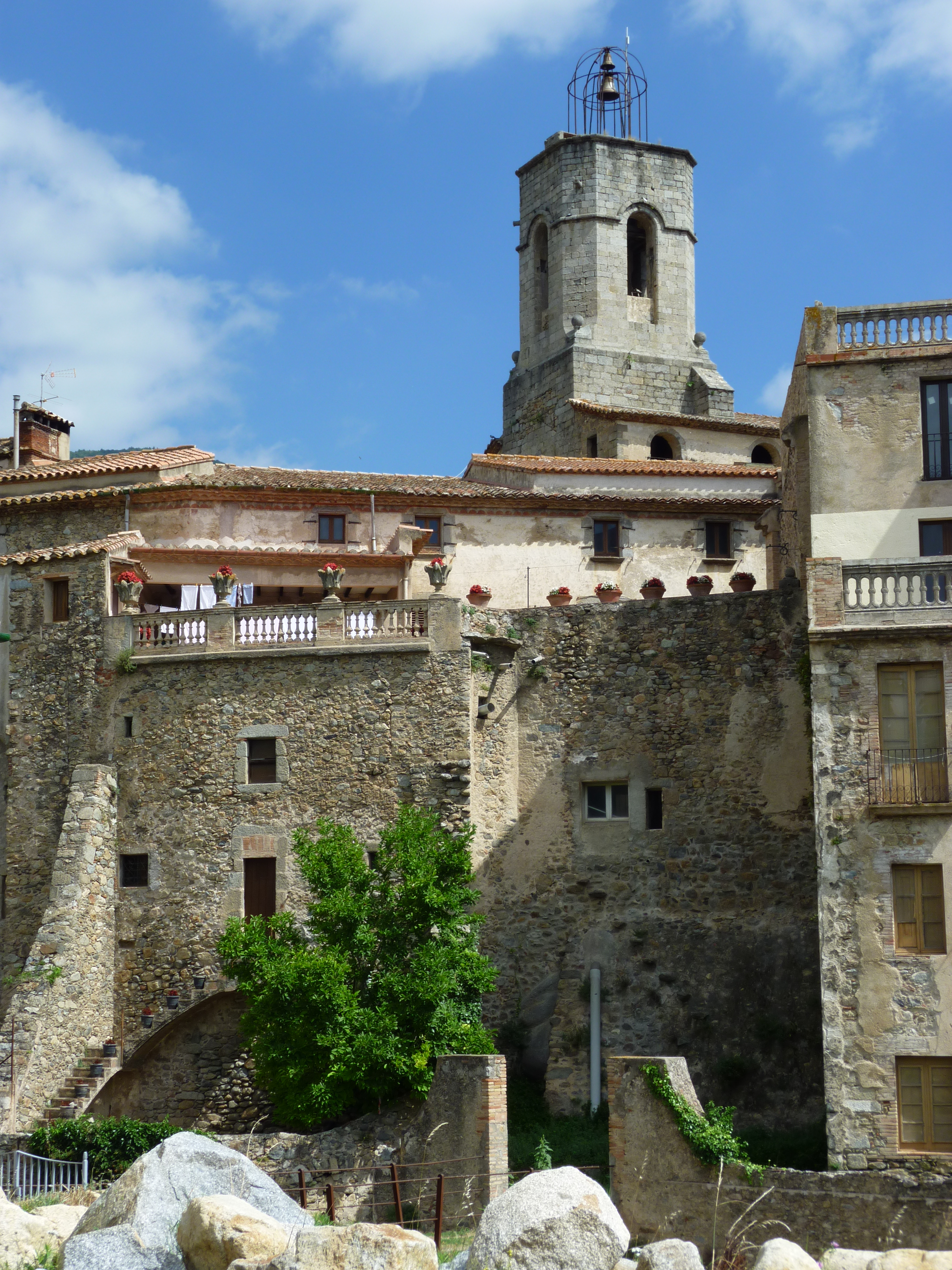
- St. Martin's belltower

- Flag Coat of arms

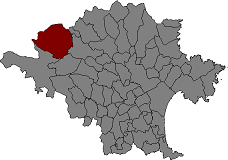
- Coordinates: 42°23′19″N 2°45′7″E
- Country: Spain
- Autonomous Community: Catalonia
- Province: Girona
- Comarca: Alt Empordà

Government
  - Mayor: Javi Molina Mejuto (28th of May, 2024)

Area
  - Total: 67.9 km^{2} (26.2 sq mi)
- Elevation: 370 m (1,210 ft)

Population (2025-01-01)
  - Total: 761
  - Density: 11.2/km^{2} (29.0/sq mi)
  - Demonym: maçanetenc /maçanetenca
- Postal code: 17720

Maçanet de Cabrenys (Catalan pronunciation: [məsəˈnɛd də kəˈβɾɛɲs]) is a municipality in the comarca of Alt Empordà, Girona, Catalonia, Spain. It also belongs to the subcomarca of Alta Garrotxa. It includes the villages of Arnera, Les Creus, Les Mines, Les Salines, Tapis, Els Vilars, and Oliveda. It is situated at the foot of the Eastern Pyrenees, with the Rivers Arnera and Frausa. It has numerous springs, which makes it attractive for tourism, the largest source of revenue, together with dryland farming and animal husbandry. It has a water bottling facility.

The center (370 m) is located in a valley between the two highest points of the municipal territory, the Puig de Les Pedrisses(1330,6 m) and the Roc de Frausa (1421 m).

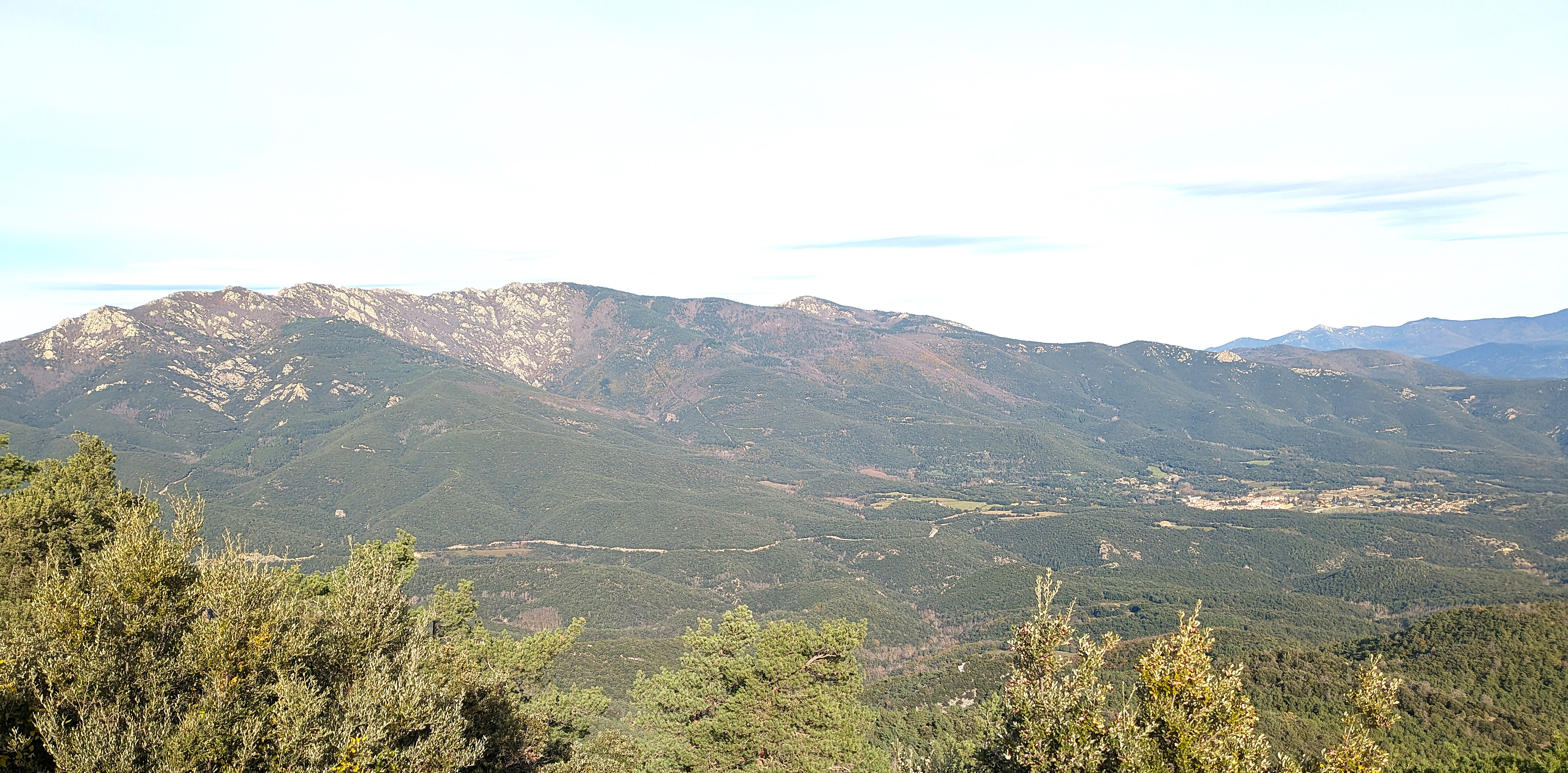
Maçanet de Cabrenys and Roc de Frausa (top left). The exposures along and below the ridge are of Ordovician orthogneiss.

== History ==
Last century, near the river Arnera there were found neolitical axe, together with the menhir called La Pedra Dreta. Those findings show that the valley of the Arnera was populated from prehistoric periods. The first documented mention of the place appears in the precept of Louis the Pious in 814, in which it says that Céret limits south with villam quae dicitur Macanetum.

In 954 count Guifré II of Besalú gave to the monastery of Sant Pere of Camprodon the allodium of Tapis, to build the sanctuary of Les Salines. During the Medium Age it was fortified, and there are still remains of the wall with three covers of the 15th century. In 1440 they added de Cabrenys to Maçanet, because the village happens to belong to the barony of Cabrenys, a line of the lineage of the Rocabertí. In 1553 the black plague annihilates half of the population. In July 1675 lieutenant-general Le Bret, with 1,500 men, plunders the village.

== Economy ==
There are many sources, what joined to his climate, attracts a lot of tourism. That is the main source of economic income, together with construction, agriculture and livestock. There is a water bottling plant. There was textile industry, and factories that made cork caps. Now there are a lot of restaurants. There was a big factory of pipes. Now it remains a small workshop. Agriculture, livestock and forest industry have almost disappeared.

== Places of interest ==
=== Church of Sant Martí ===
The church of Sant Martí, built in the 12th or 13th century, belongs to the late romanesque. It consists of a single rectangular nave covered by a vault in arc, and a semicircular apse covered by a vault in the form of an almond. The portal is formed by an eardrum cantilever with four arches and an arquivolta. The door, made of wood, has wrought iron details characteristic of that time.

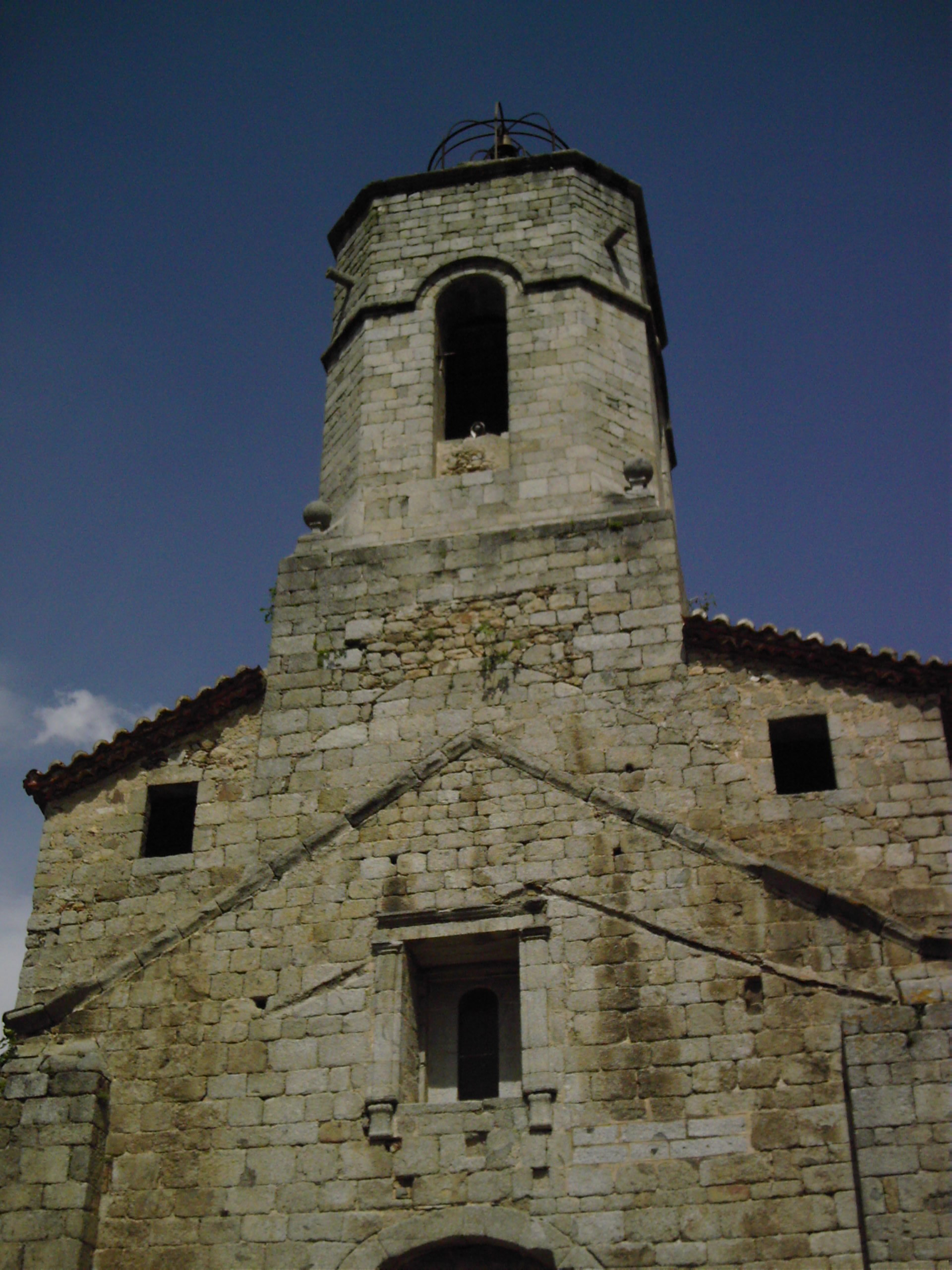
Façade of the church

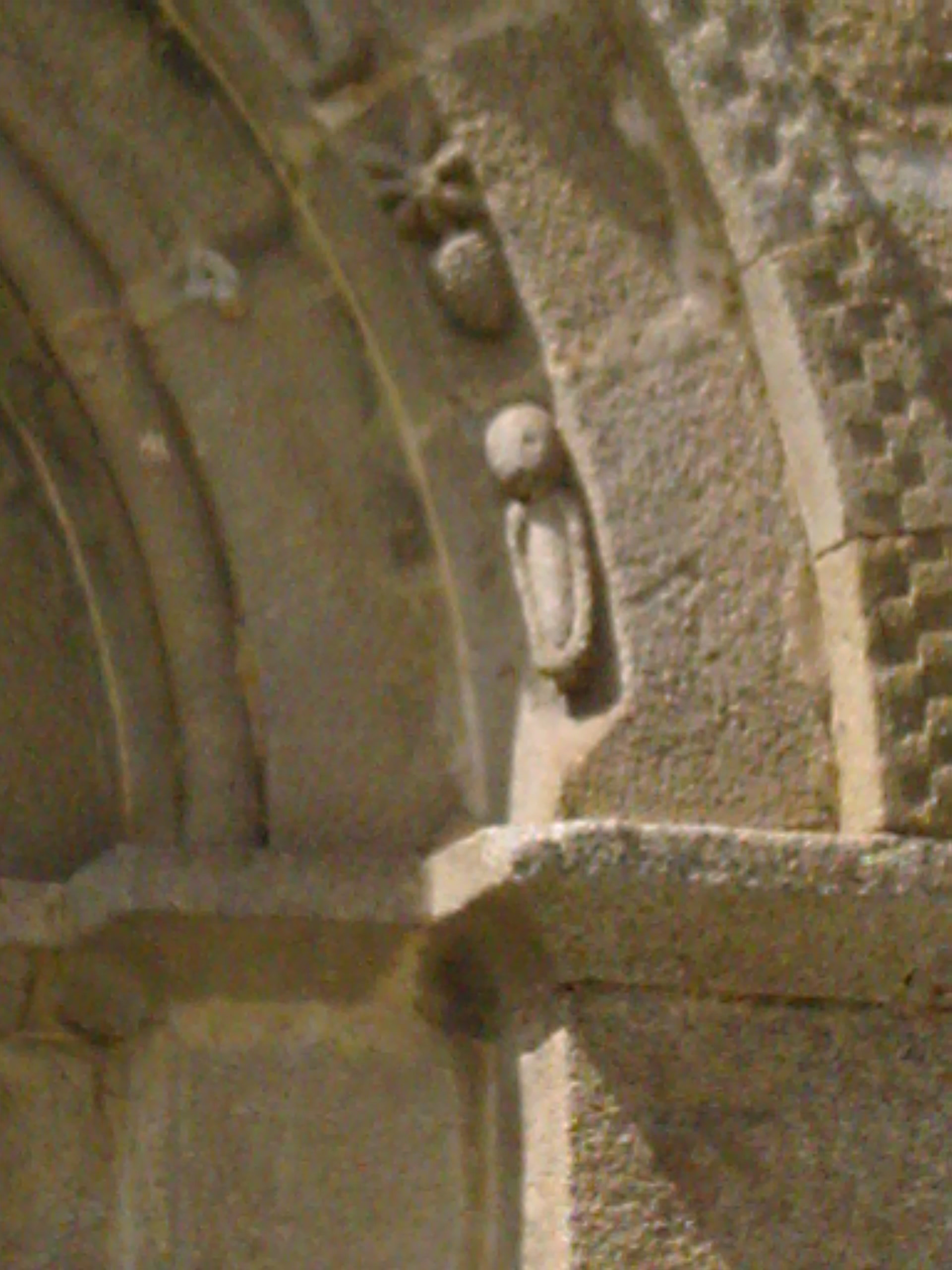
Details of the portal

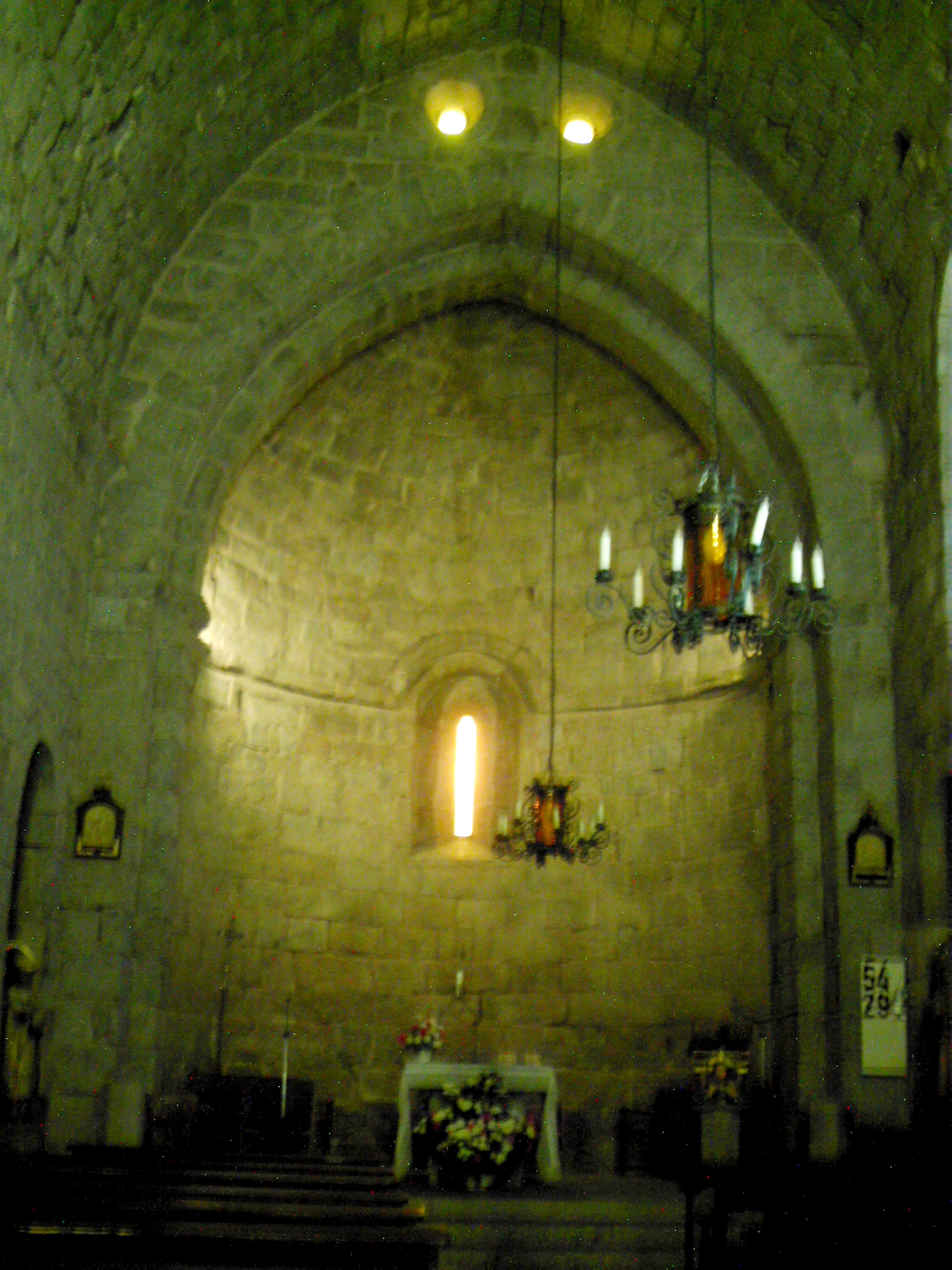
Inside the church

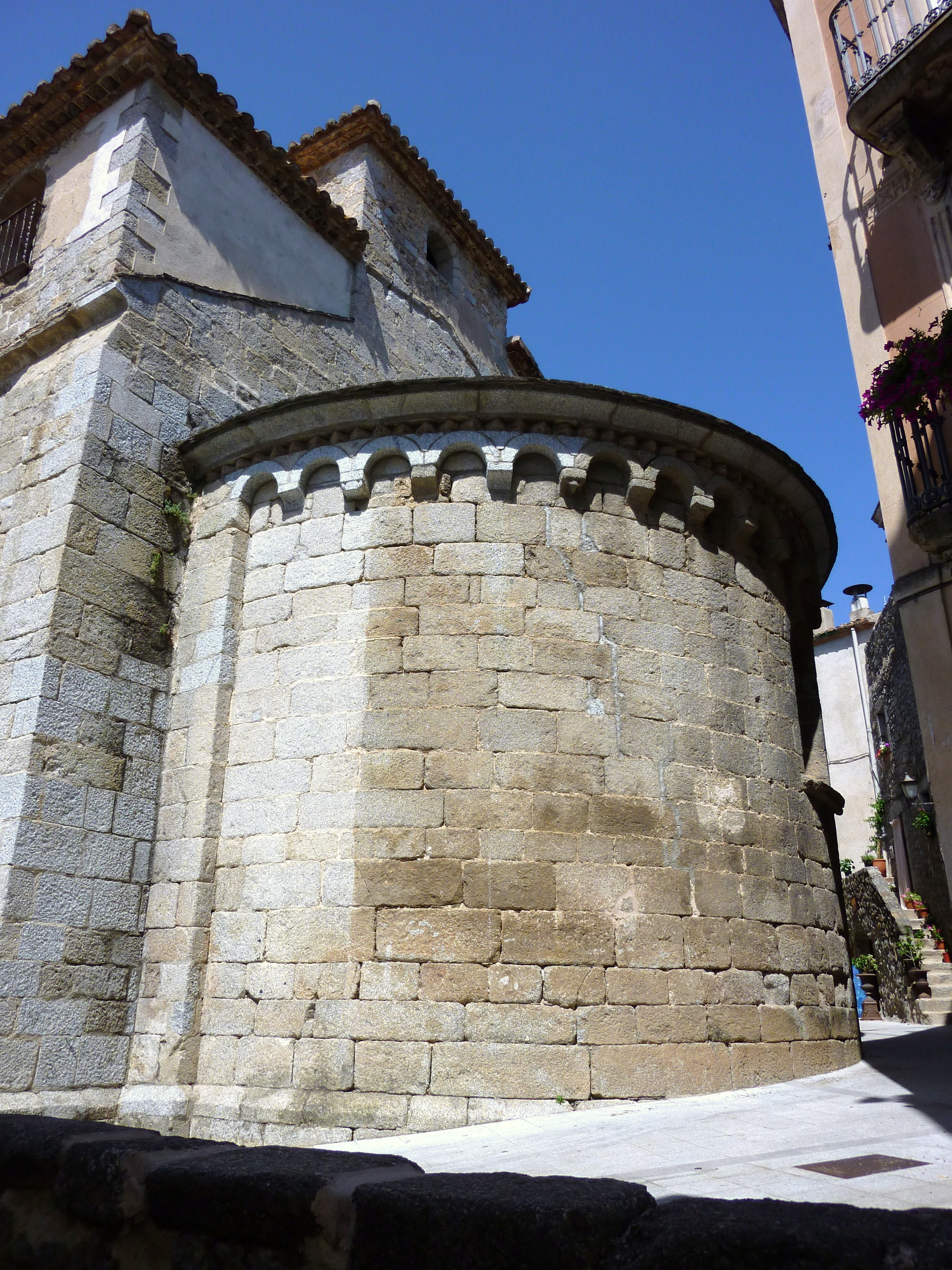
Apse

=== Chapel of Sant Sebastià ===
It was built after the outbreak of plague at the end of the 16th century, by popular contributions. The present chapel is a reform made in the 18th century.

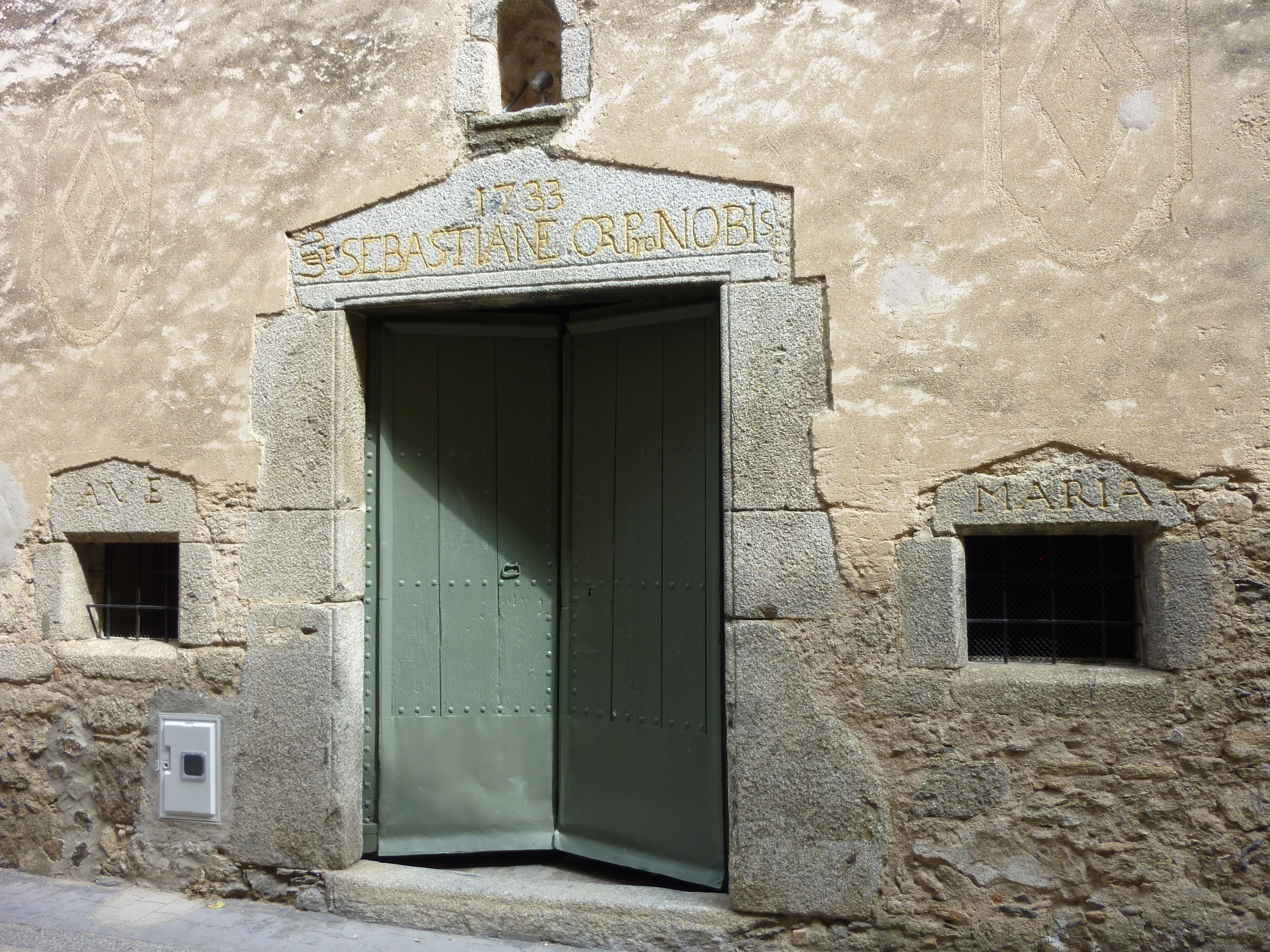
Façade of the chapel

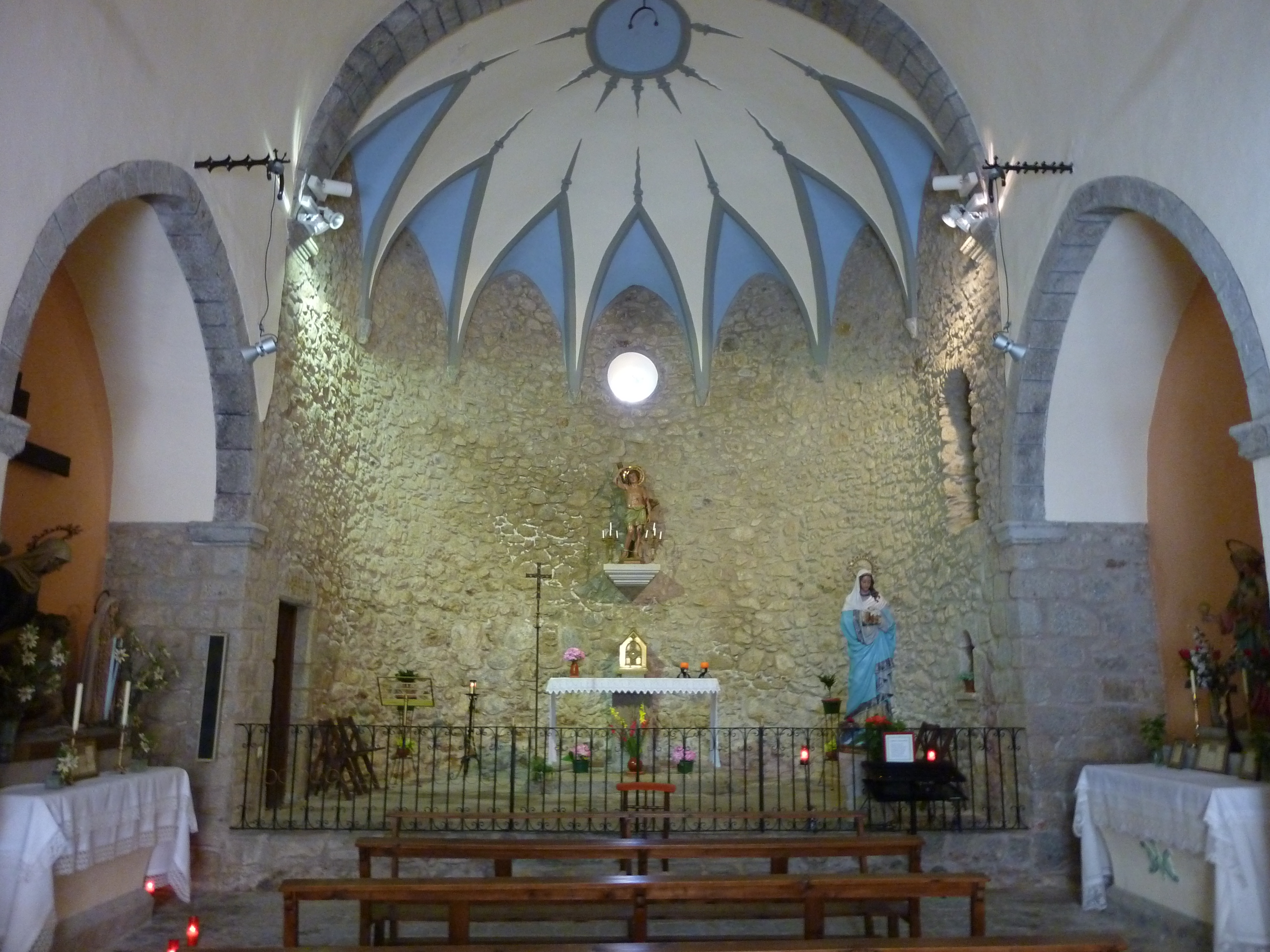
Inside the chapel

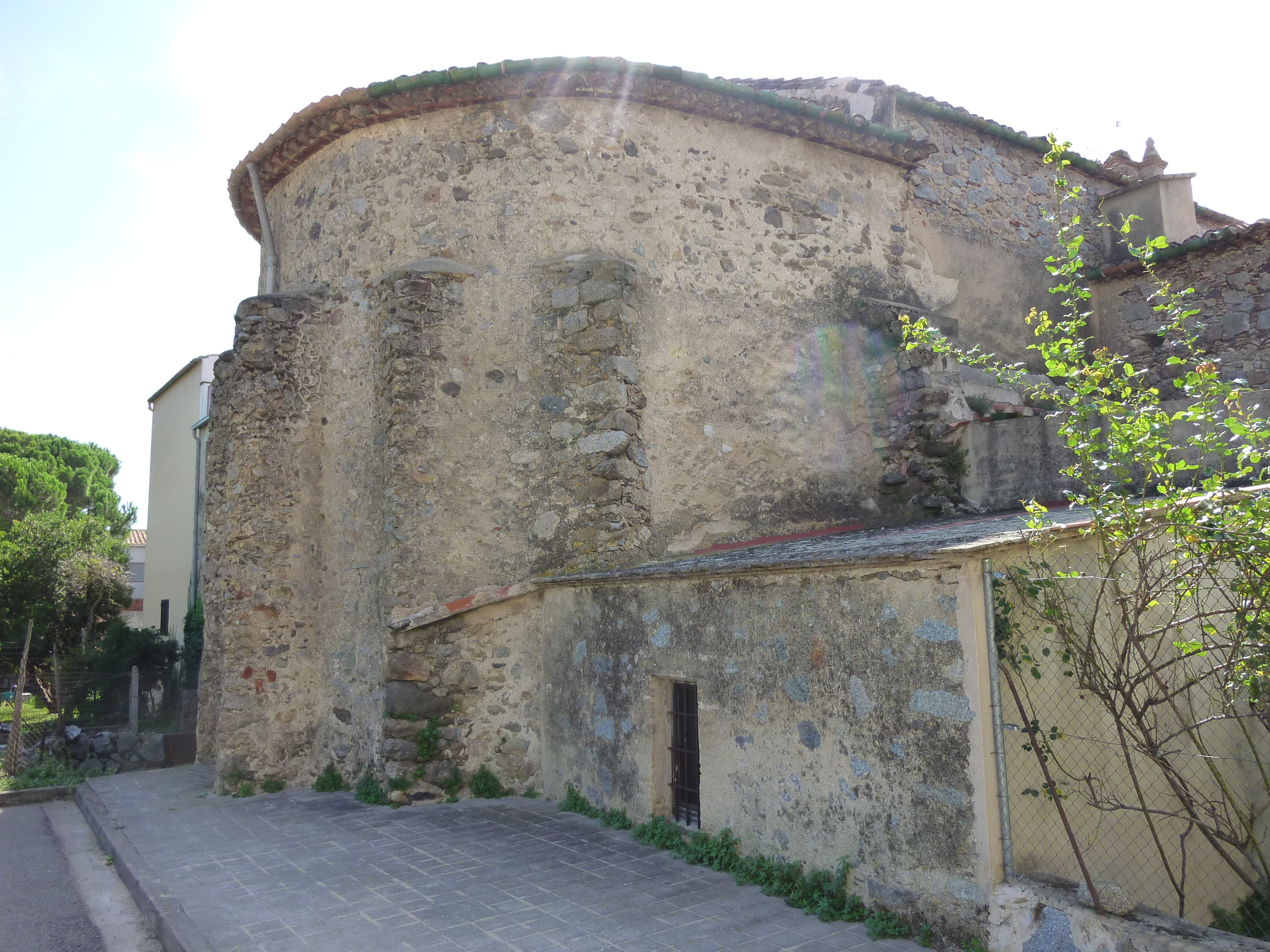
Apse

=== Sanctuary of Our Lady of Les Salines ===
It is situated almost in the summit of the mountain of this name. At 1,100 metres of height and 15 kilometres from the village. It was built in 1271 and reformed in the 18th century.

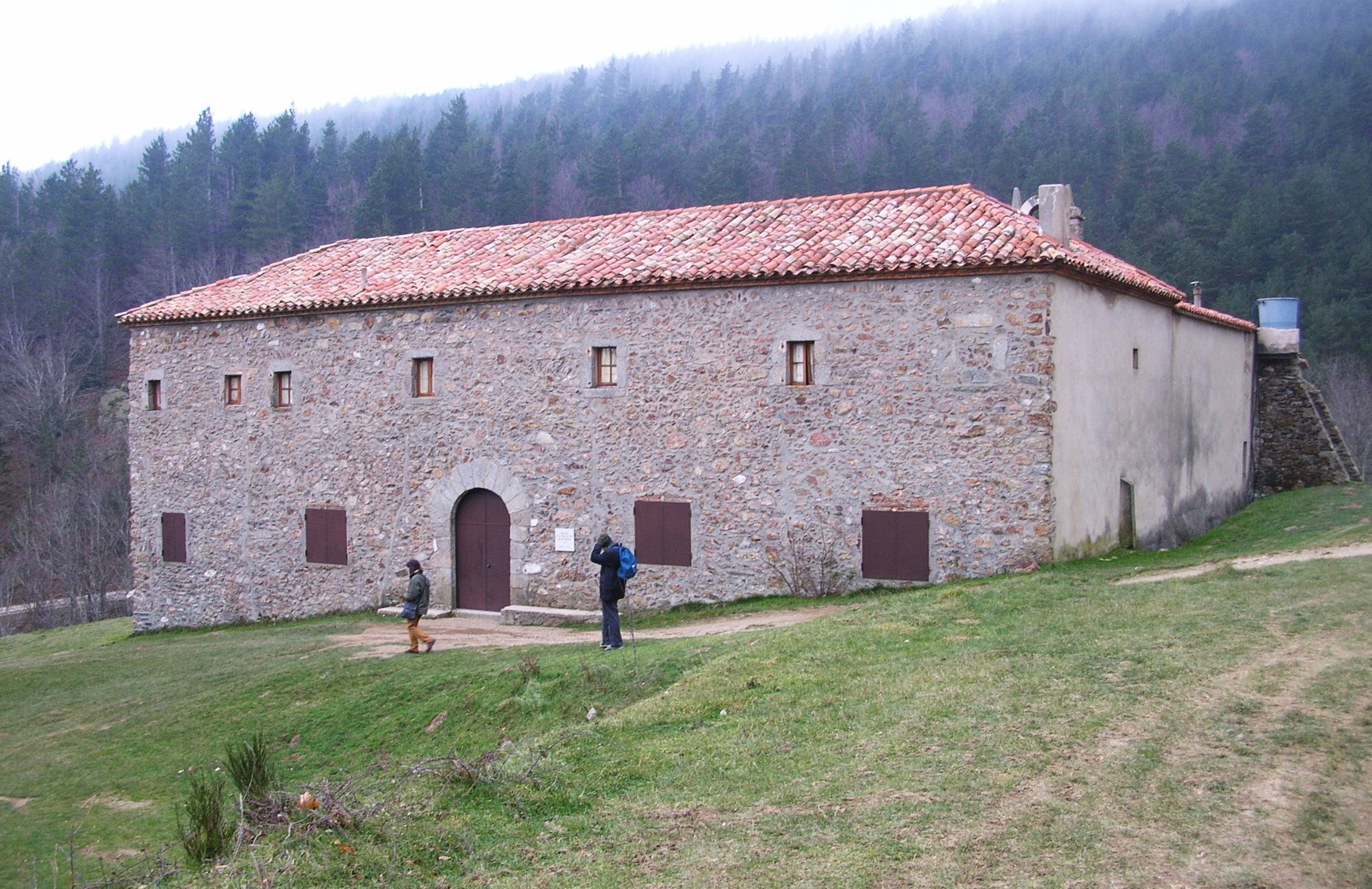
Façade of the sanctuary

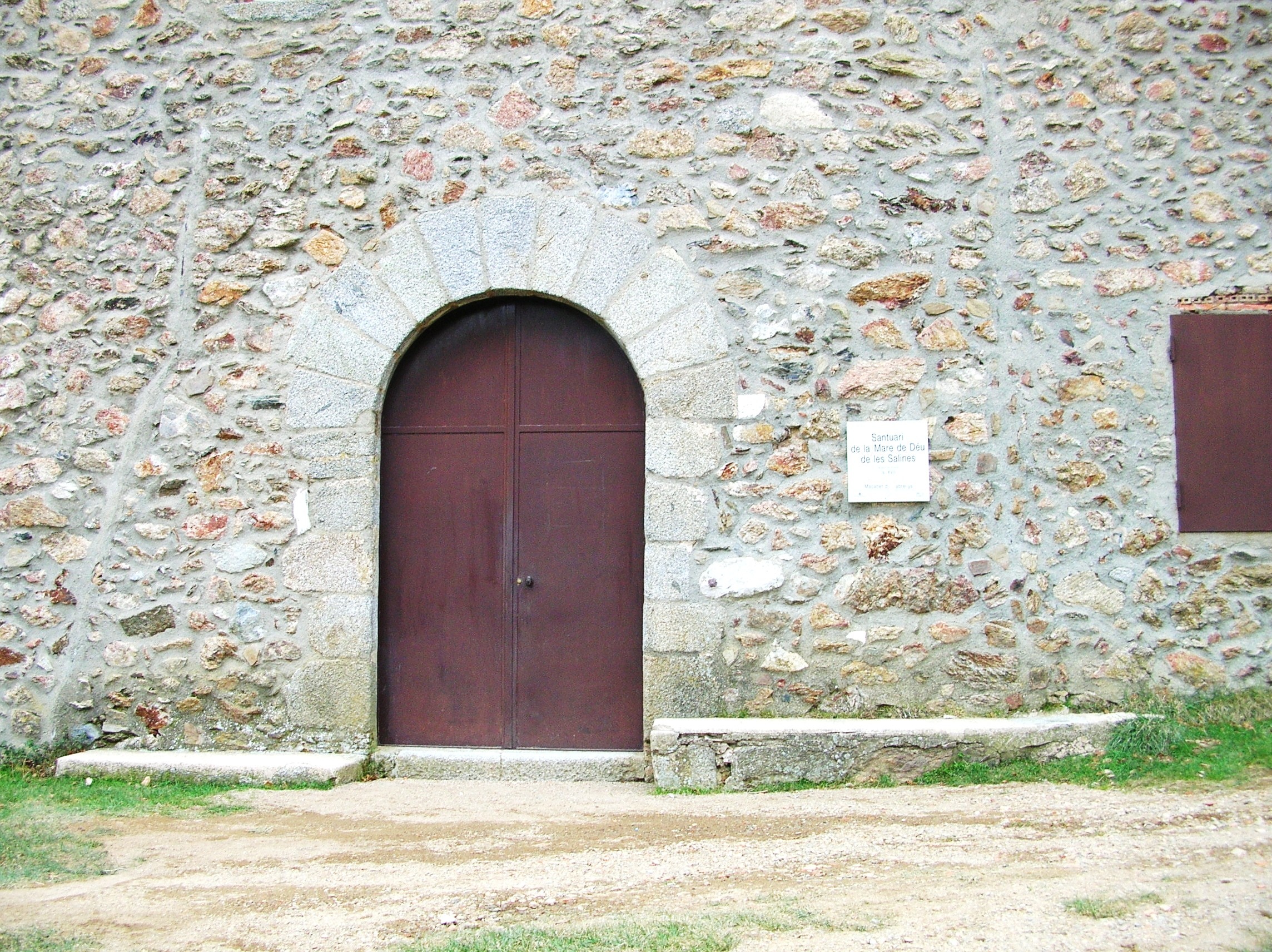
The door of the sanctuary

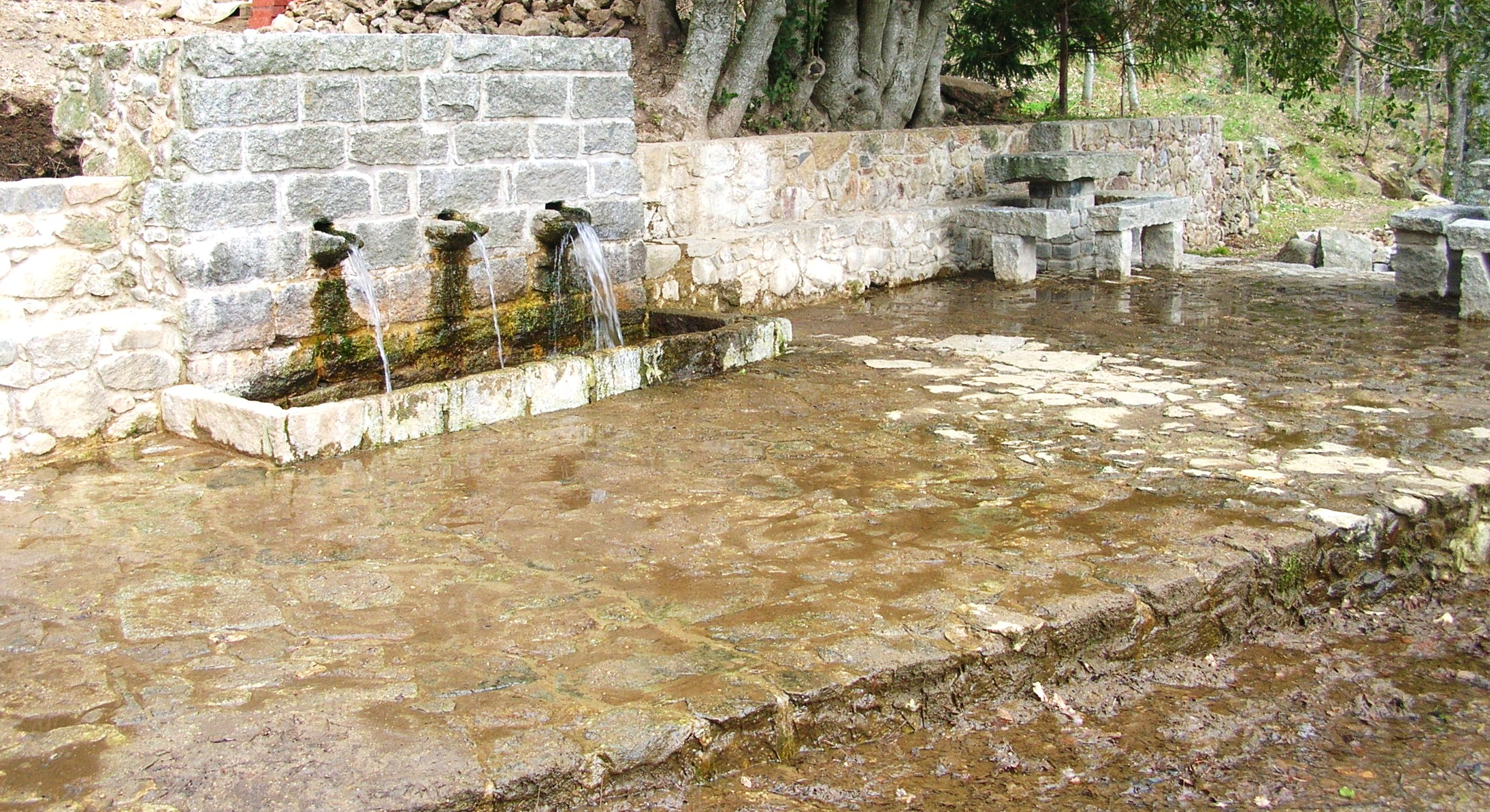
The source of the three jets, next to the sanctuary

== Tapis ==
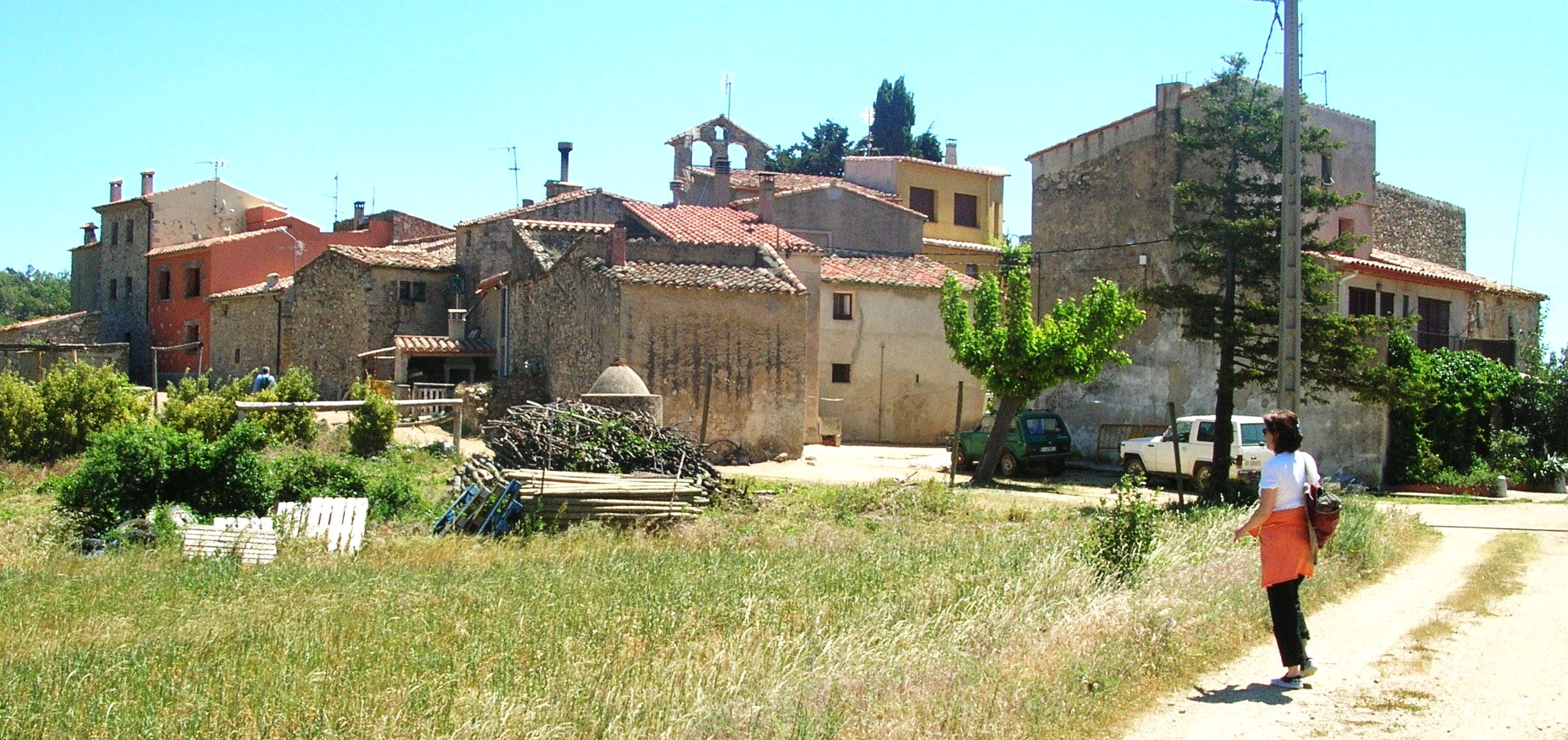
Tapis from the road between Costoja and Maçanet de Cabrenys

Tapis is a hamlet in the municipality of Maçanet de Cabrenys. It is cited for the first time in a document dated 954. In 2005 it had 25 inhabitants.

=== Church of Sant Briç ===
It is a building from the late 12th or early 13th century. From a single nave, two side chapels form transept. The apse, semicircular, with almond-shaped turn, opens onto the shed by means of a double arch. The slenderness of the turn, the proportions, the style and the structure of the capitals of the portal are elements that represented the final stage of Romanesque art.

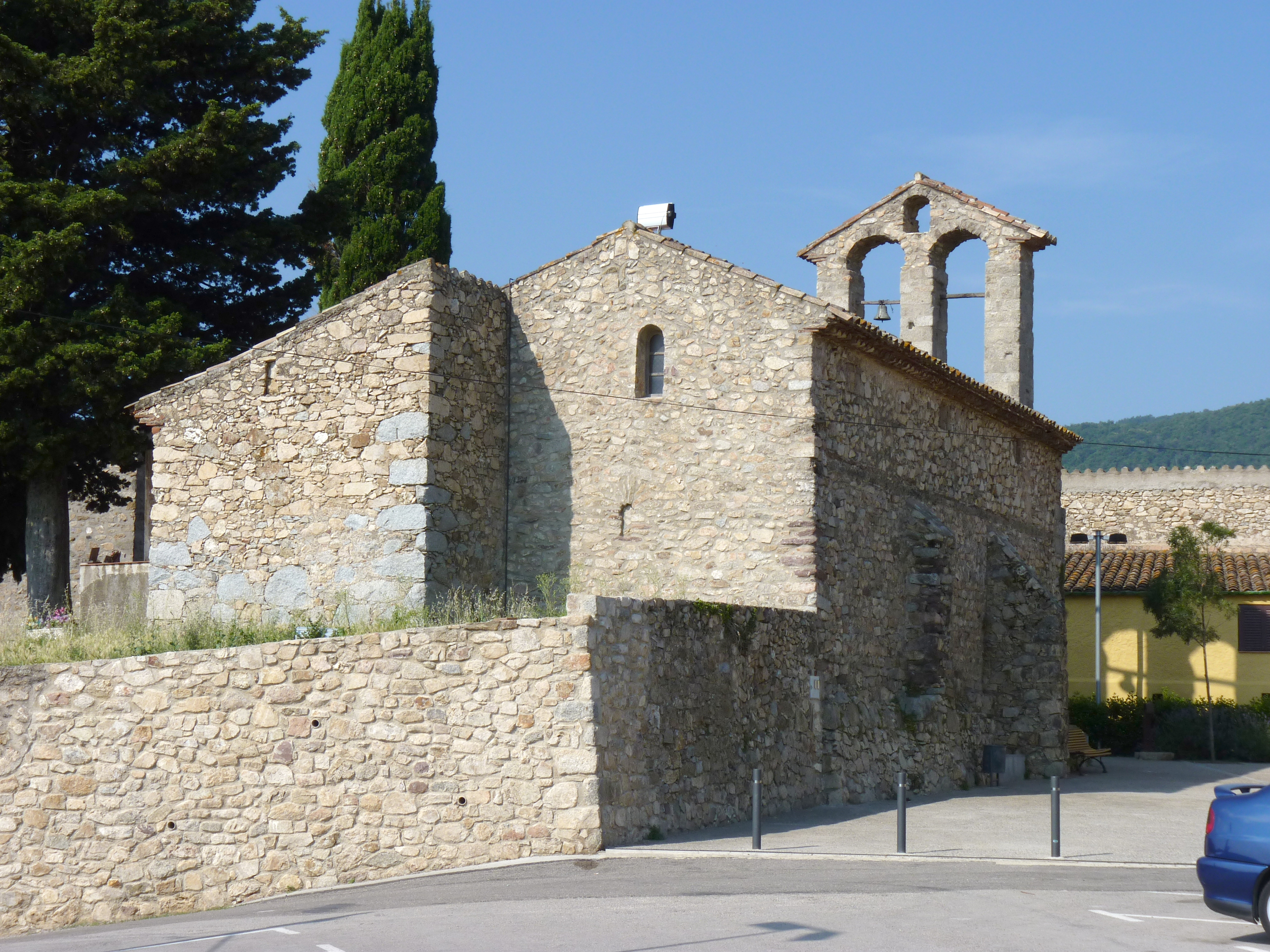
Church of Sant Briç

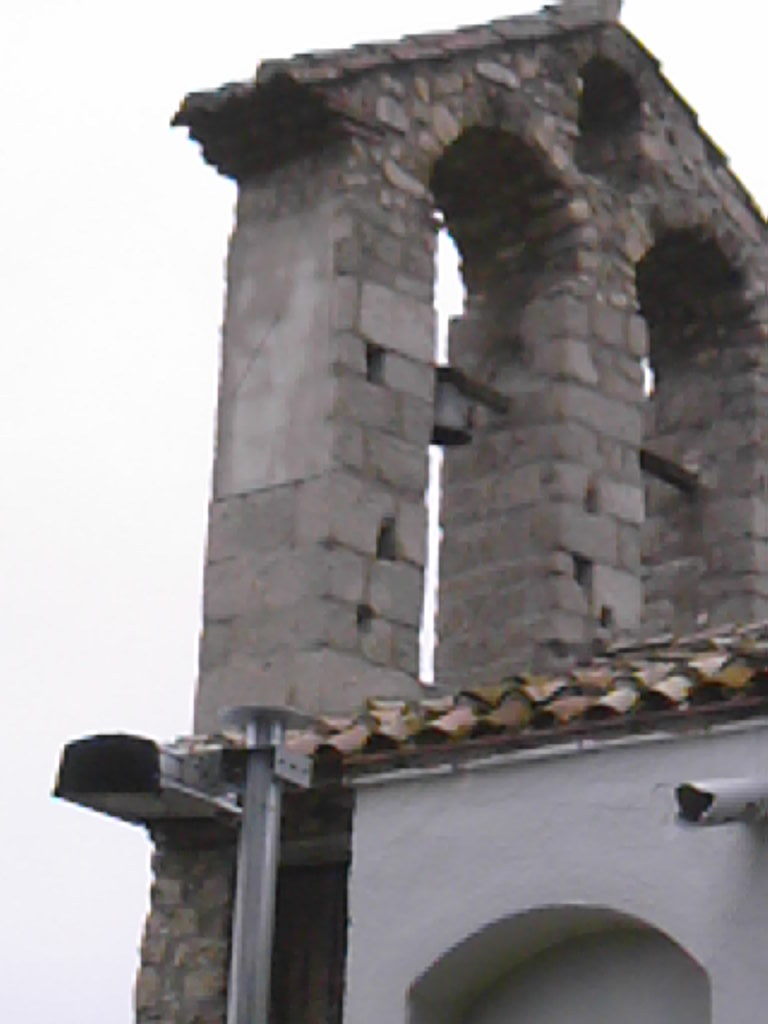
The bell tower

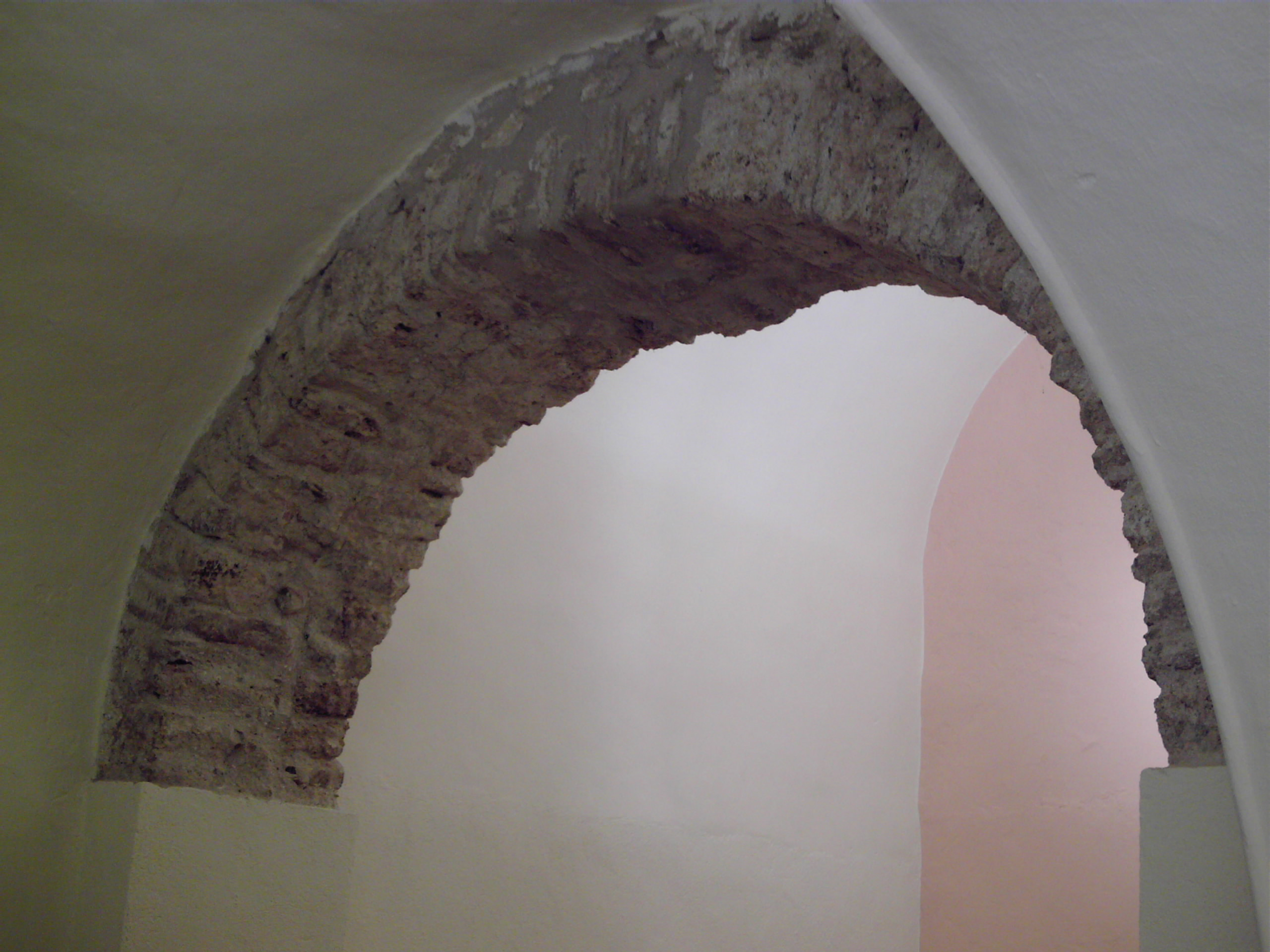
Inside the church

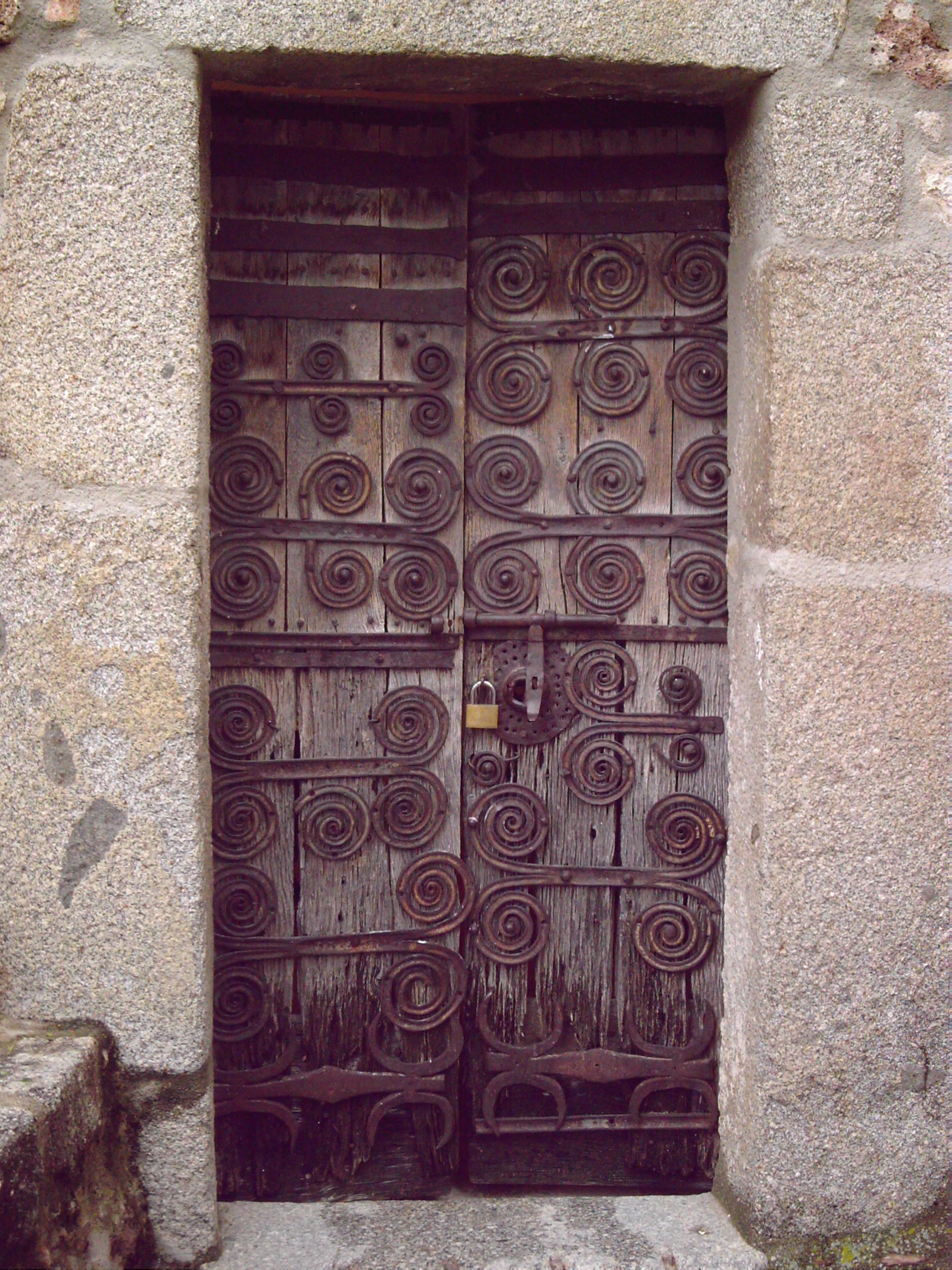
The door of the church

== Mountains of Maçanet de Cabrenys ==
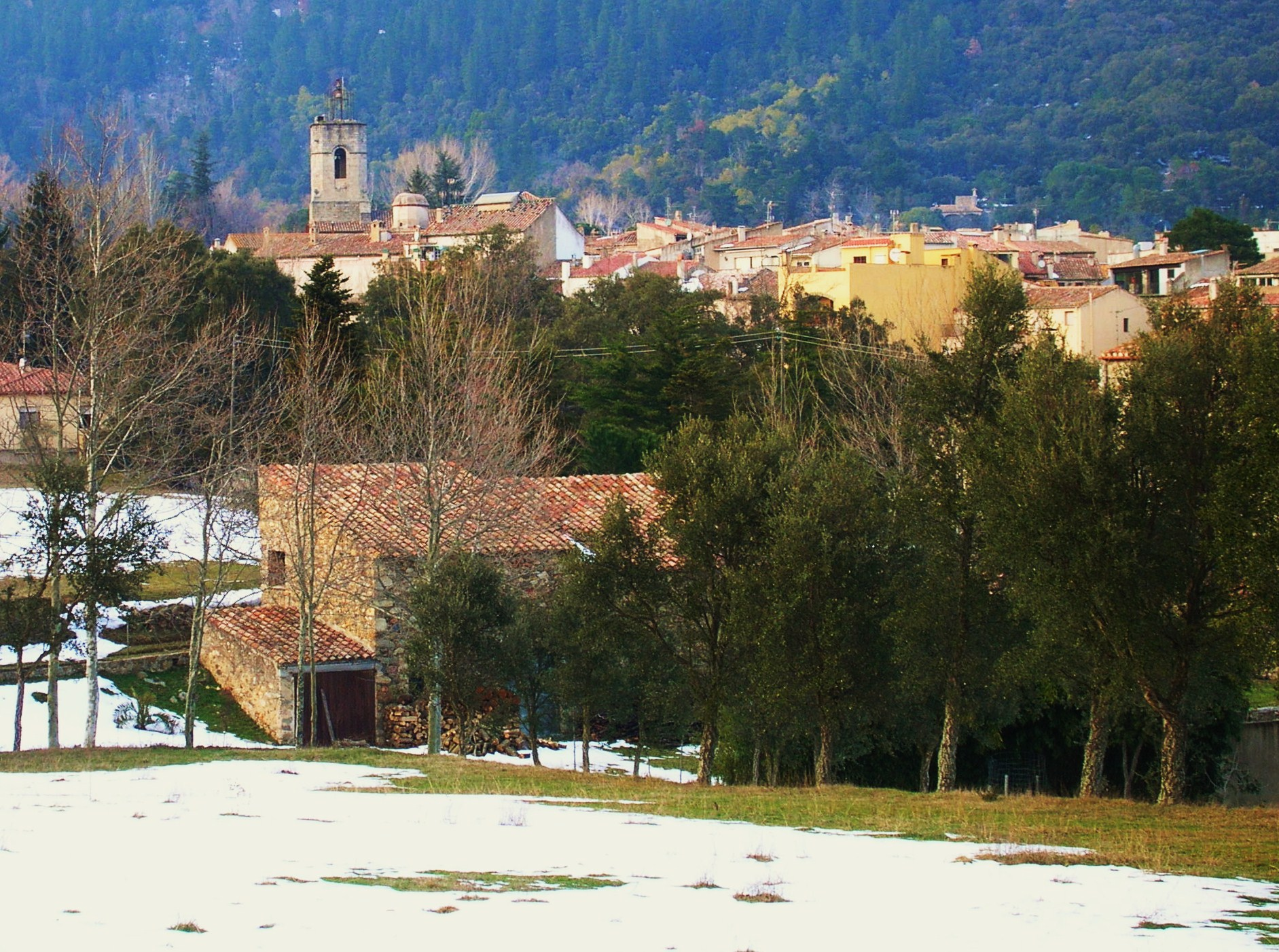
Maçanet de Cabrenys in winter

- Roc de Frausa.
- Roc del Comptador.
- Roc de la Campana.
- Castell de Bac Grillera.
- Puig d'Avall.
- Puig del Boixer.
- Puig Brosser.
- Puig de Calabuig.
- Puig del Coll dels Pins.
- El Cornell.
- Puig de la Creu.
- La Creu del Canonge.
- El Moixer.
- Puig de l'Evangeli.
- Puig del Faig.
- Puig Falcó.
- Puig Farner.
- Puig de la Guàrdia.
- Puig de la Jana.
- Roca Saquer.
- Puig de la Màquina.
- Puig de Milà.
- Puig de les Pedrisses.
- Puig de la Quera.
- Roc de la Sentinella.
- Roc del Pou.
- Rocacinta.
- Puig de les Roques.
- Puig de Rovirós.
- Puig del Solà de Sant Pere.
