= Cim del Mont-roig =

Mountain of Catalonia, Spain

Coordinates: 42°42′29″N 1°10′16″E

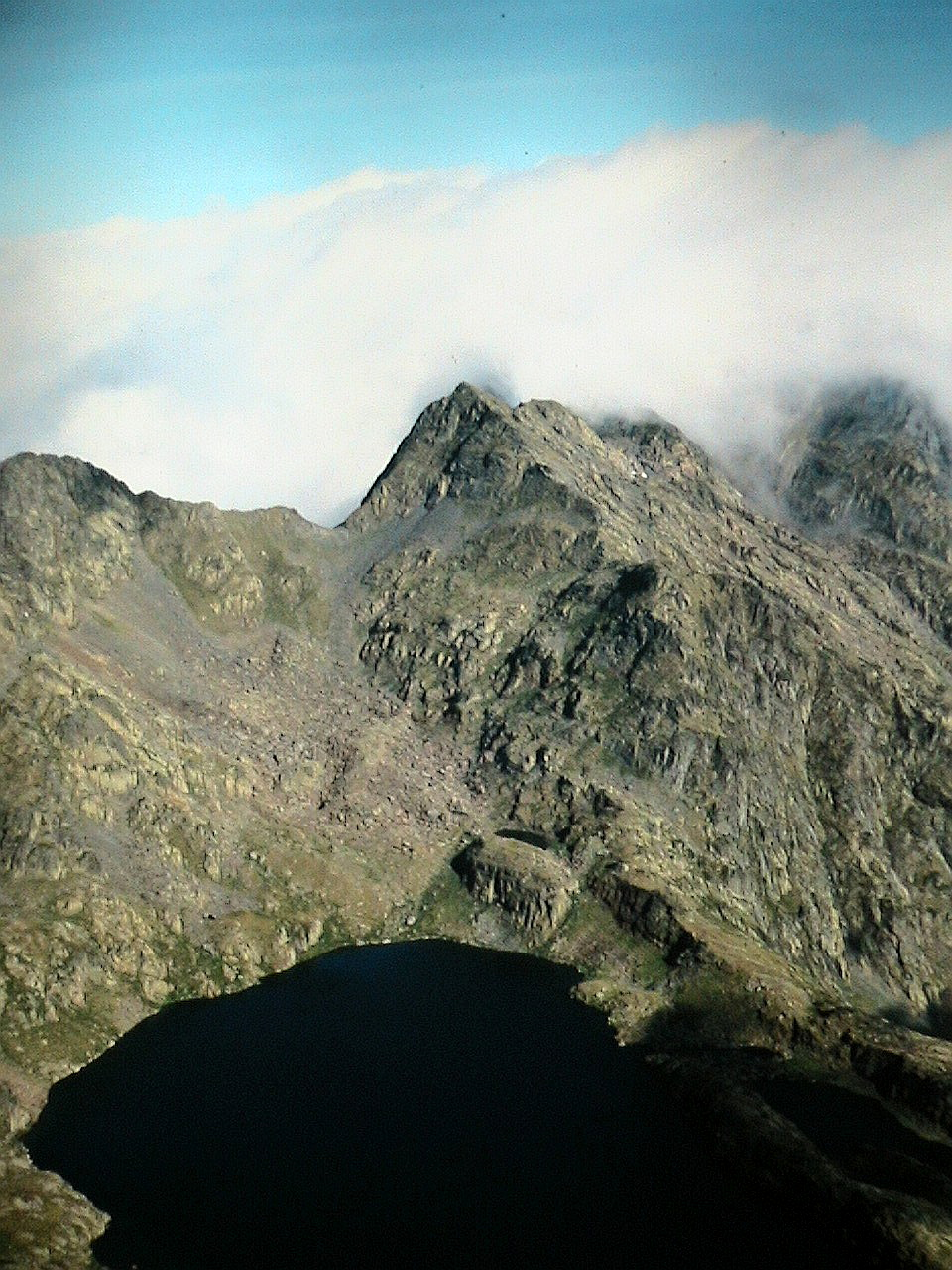
- View of Mont-roig (right) partially covered by fog

Highest point
- Elevation: 2,864 m (9,396 ft)
- Prominence: 648 m (2,126 ft)

Geography
- Location: Catalonia, Spain
- Parent range: Pyrenees

Cim del Mont-roig is a mountain of Catalonia, Spain. Located in the Pyrenees, it has an altitude of 2846 metres above sea level.

== See also ==
- Mountains of Catalonia
