= Pic de Noucreus =

Mountain in Spain

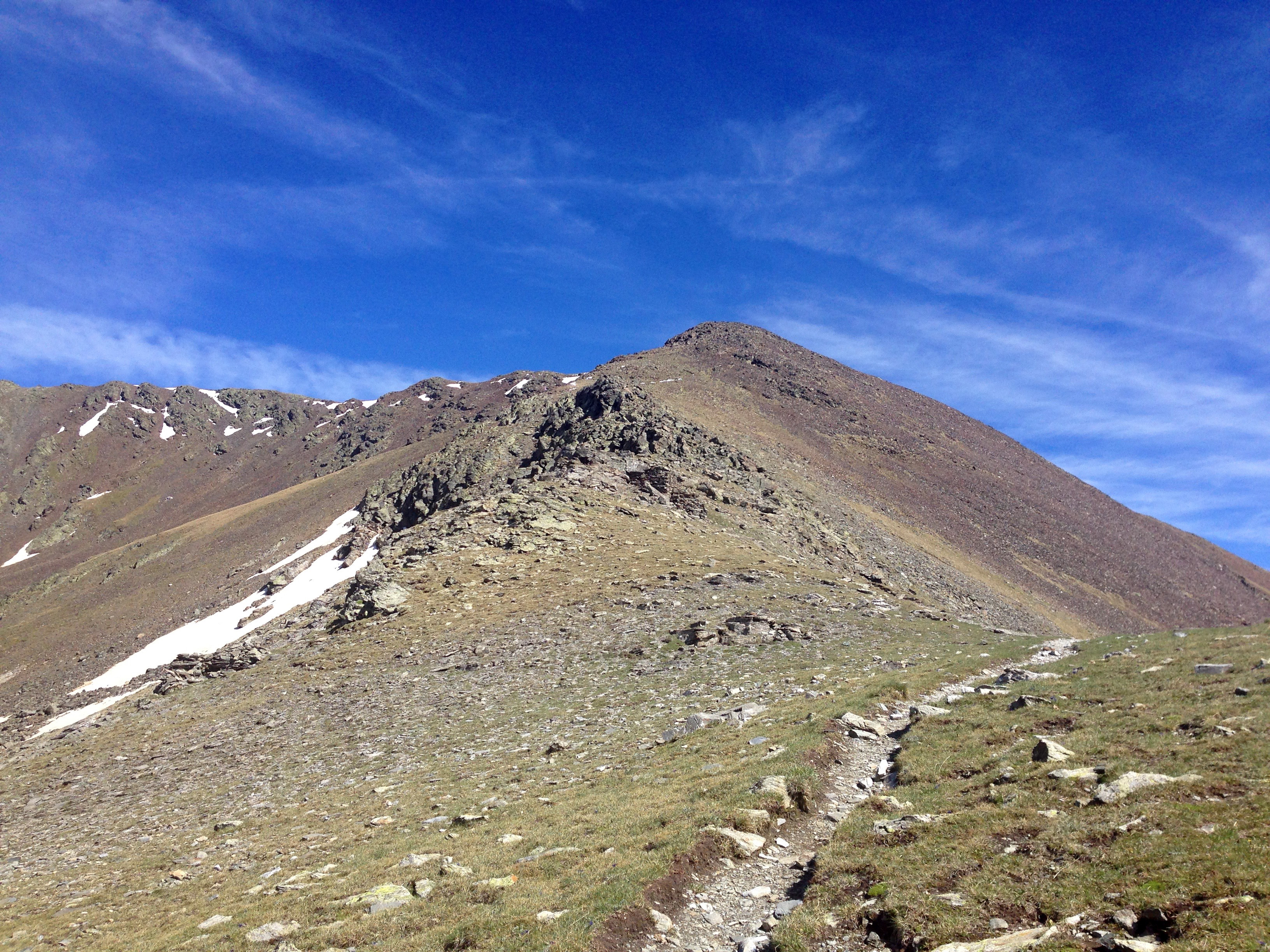
- Pic de Noucreus seen from the west

Highest point
- Elevation: 2,799 m (9,183 ft)
- Coordinates: 42°25′10″N 2°11′03″E

Geography
- Location: Catalonia, Spain
- Parent range: Pyrenees

Pic de Noucreus is a mountain of Catalonia, Spain. Located in the Pyrenees, it has an elevation of 2,799 metres (9,183 ft) above sea level.

== See also ==
- Mountains of Catalonia
