= Sant Mamet =

Coordinates: 41°58′40″N 0°56′29″E

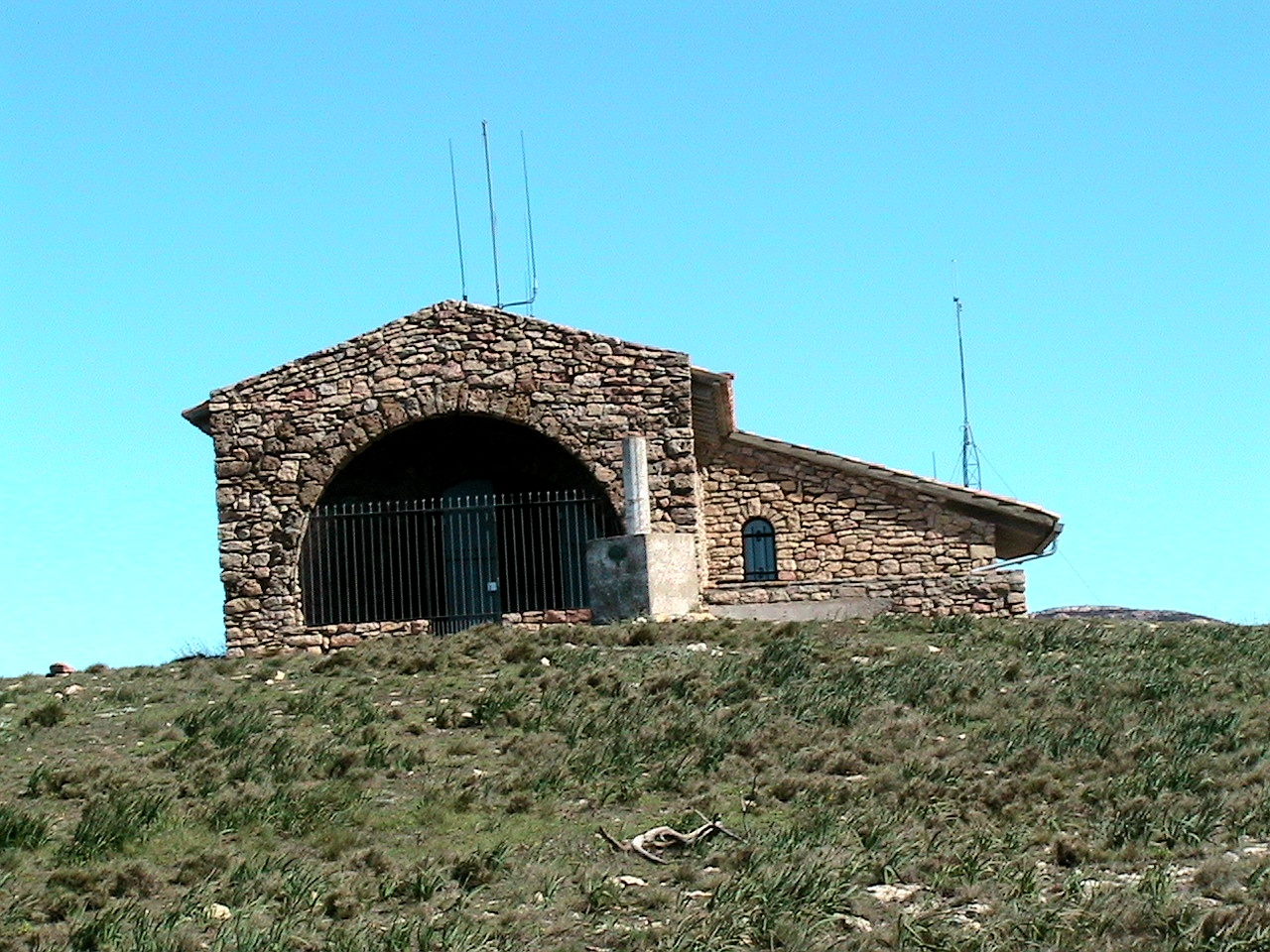
- Hermitage-refuge of Sant Mamet, with the geodesic vertex in front. Restored by Alòs City Council.

Highest point
- Elevation: 1,391 m (4,564 ft)

Geography
- Location: Catalonia, Spain

Sant Mamet is a mountain of Catalonia, Spain. It has an elevation of 1,391 metres above sea level.

== See also ==
- Mountains of Catalonia
