= Turó del Samont =

Mountain in Spain

Coordinates: 41°44′34″N 2°21′59″E

Highest point
- Elevation: 1,272 m (4,173 ft)

Geography
- Location: Catalonia, Spain

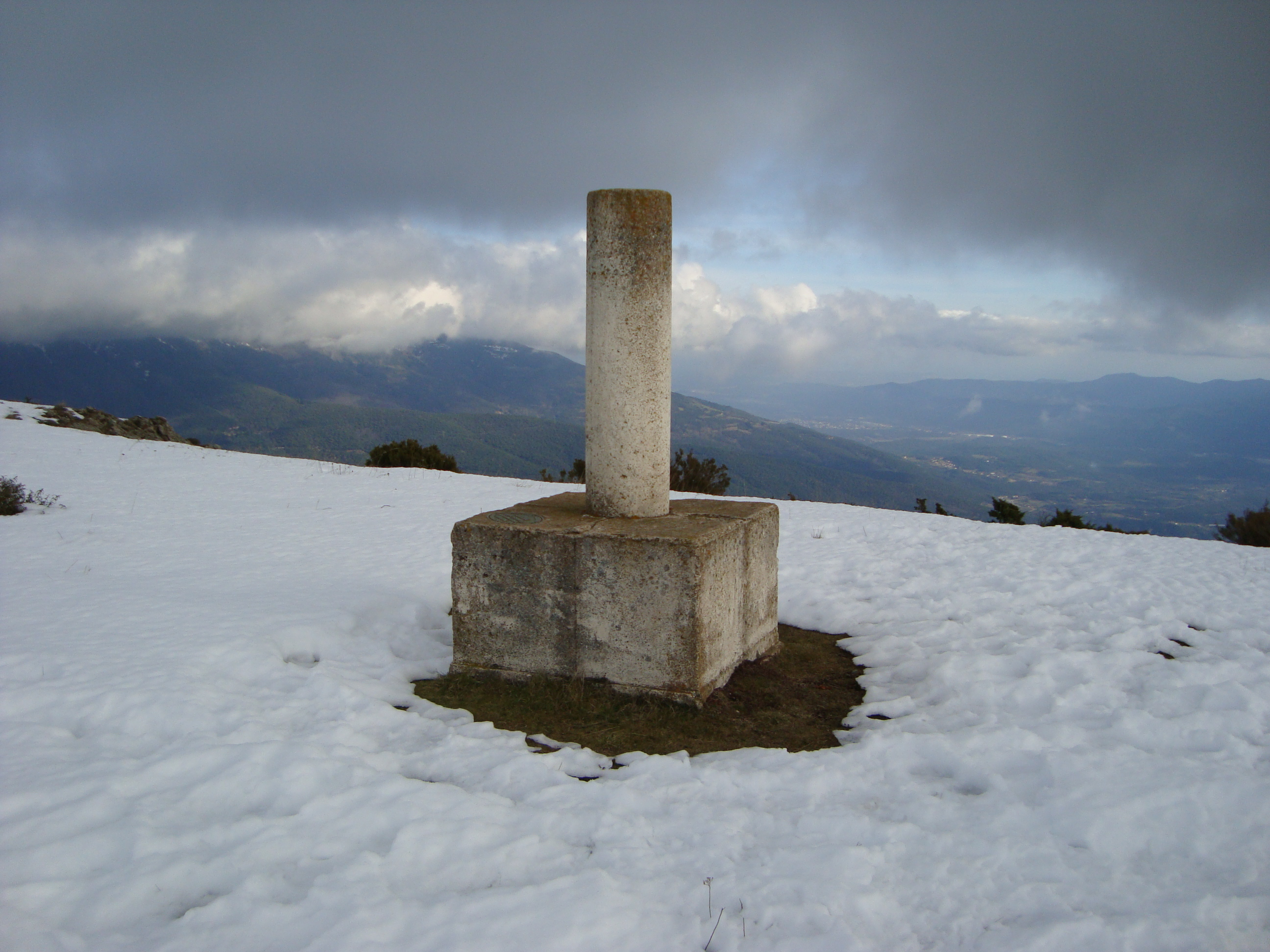
Surveyors' marker atop Samont

Turó del Samont is a mountain of Catalonia, Spain. It has an elevation of 1,272 metres above sea level.

== See also ==
- Mountains of Catalonia
