= Turó Gros (Sant Celoni) =

Coordinates: 41°39′41″N 2°34′35″E

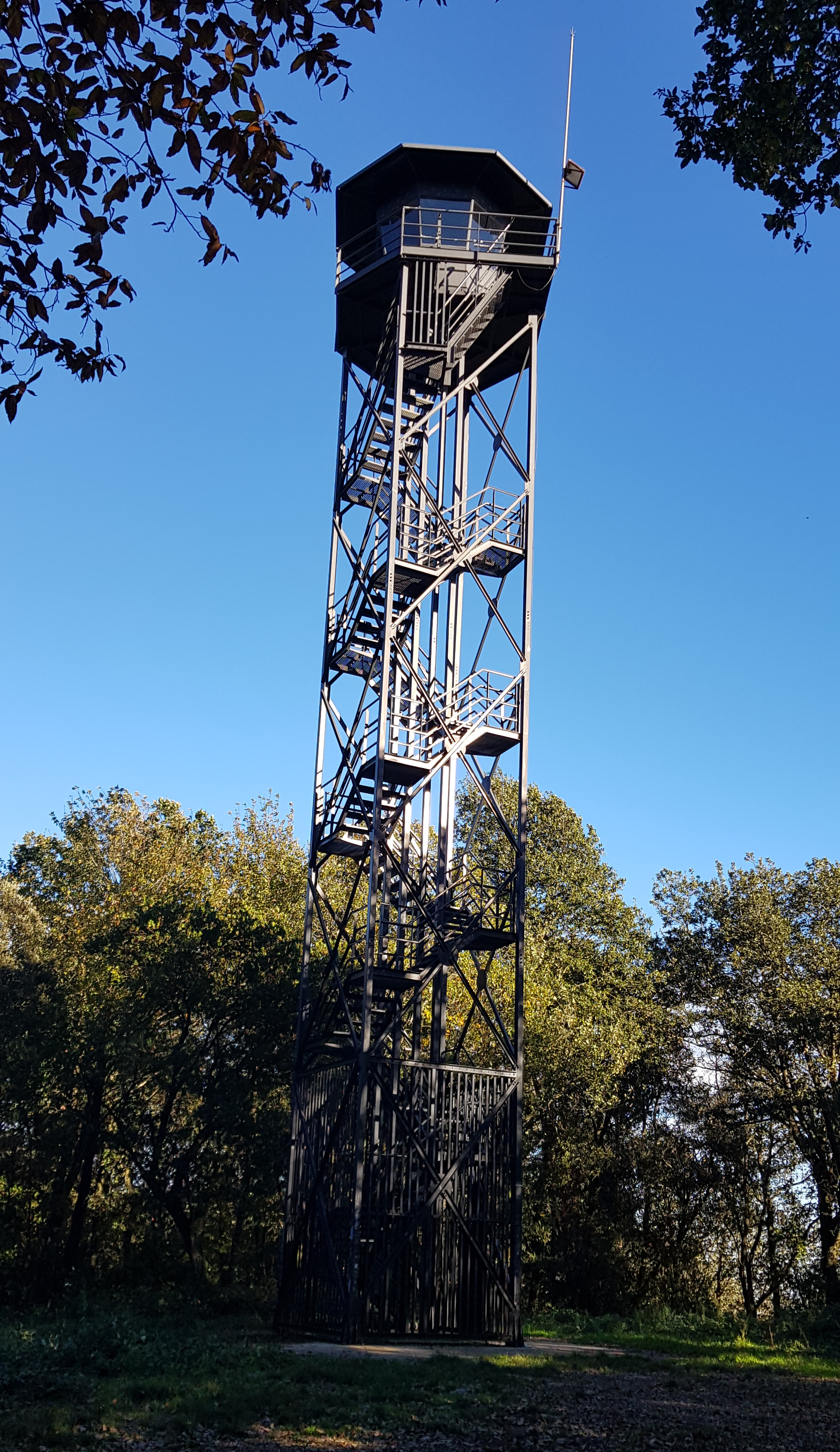
- Turó Gros Tower.

Highest point
- Elevation: 766 m (2,513 ft)

Geography
- Location: Catalonia, Spain

Turó Gros (Sant Celoni) is a mountain of Catalonia, Spain. It has an elevation of 766 metres above sea level.

== See also ==
- Mountains of Catalonia
