= Coma del Clot =

Mountain in Spain

Coordinates: 42°23′48″N 2°11′07″E

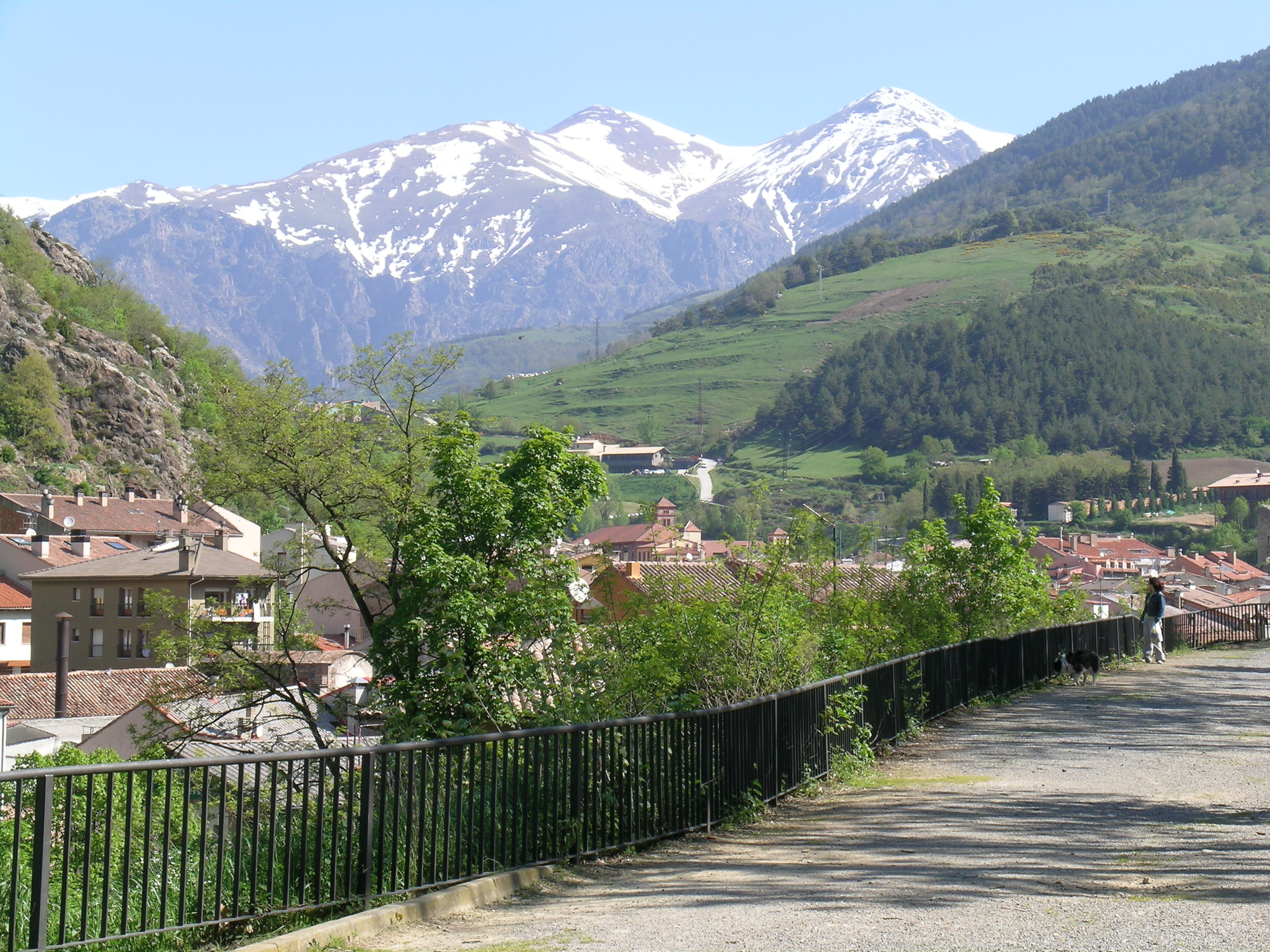
- View of Coma del Clot

Geography
- Location: Catalonia, Spain
- Parent range: Pyrenees

Coma del Clot is a mountain of Catalonia, Spain. Located in the Pyrenees, it has an altitude of 2739 metres above sea level.

== See also ==
- Mountains of Catalonia
