= Els Munts =

Coordinates: 42°04′43″N 2°09′12″E

Highest point
- Elevation: 1,057 m (3,468 ft)
- Listing: Mountains in Catalonia

Geography
- Location: Catalonia, Spain

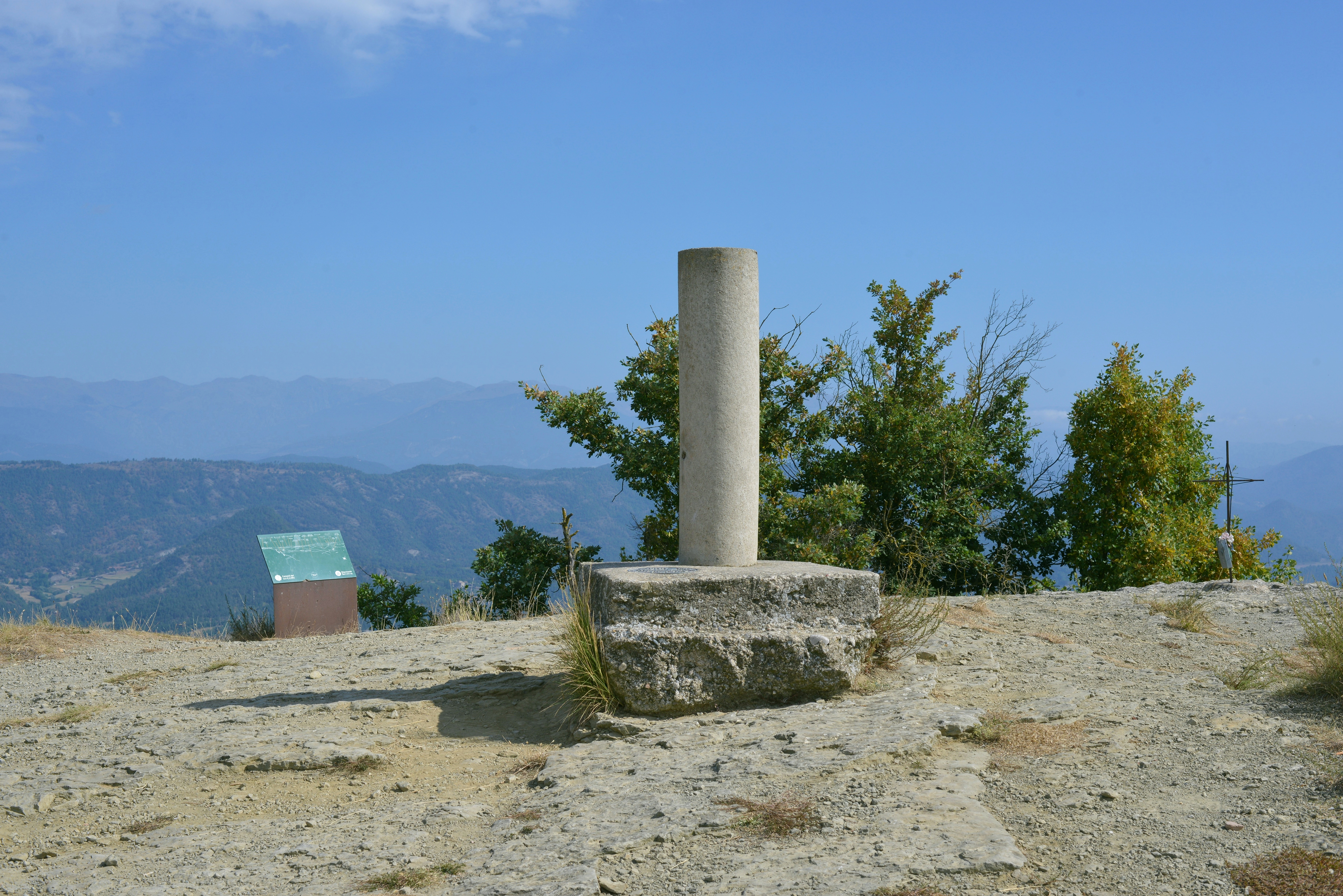

Els Munts is a mountain of Catalonia, Spain. It has an elevation of 1,057 metres above sea level.
