= Montagut d'Ancosa =

Mountain in Spain

Coordinates: 41°24′26″N 1°25′20″E

Highest point
- Elevation: 963 m (3,159 ft)
- Listing: Mountains in Catalonia

Geography
- Location: Catalonia, Spain

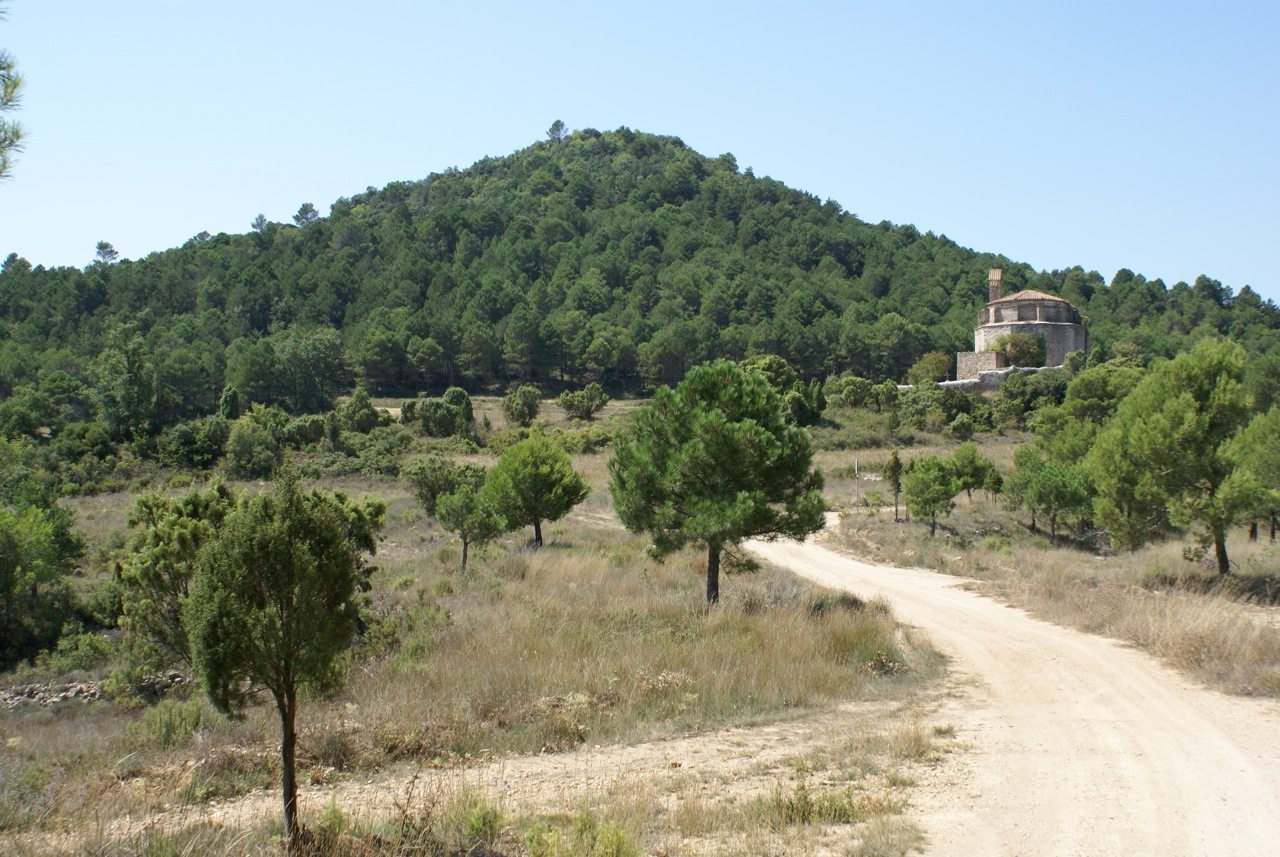

Montagut d'Ancosa is a mountain of Catalonia, Spain. It has an elevation of 963 metres above sea level.
