= Xerta =

Xerta Cherta
- Municipality
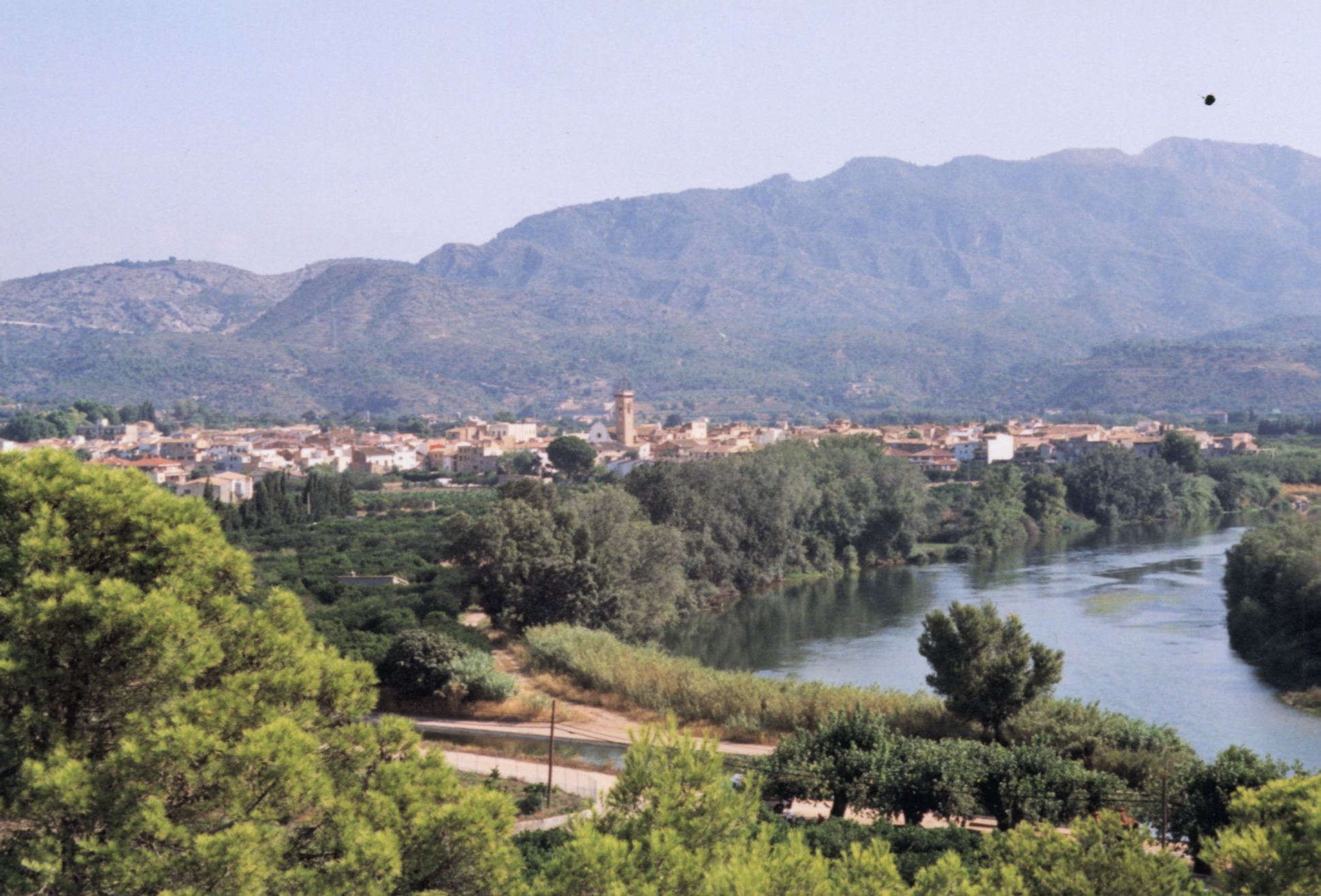

- Flag Coat of arms

- Location in Catalonia Xerta (Catalonia) Xerta (Spain)
- Coordinates: 40°54′34″N 0°29′30″E
- Country: Spain
- Autonomous Community: Catalonia
- Province: Tarragona
- Comarca: Baix Ebre

Government
  - Mayor: Roger Aviñó Martí (2015)

Area
  - Total: 32.4 km^{2} (12.5 sq mi)
- Elevation: 12 m (39 ft)

Population (2025-01-01)
  - Total: 1,180
  - Density: 36.4/km^{2} (94.3/sq mi)
- Demonym(s): Xertolí, xertolina
- Website: www.xerta.altanet.org

Xerta (Catalan pronunciation: [ˈtʃɛɾta]) is a town and municipality of the comarca of Baix Ebre. It has a population of 1,180 (register office, 2025).

It is established in a sharp bend to the right of the river Ebre, about 12 km upstream from the city of Tortosa in the province of Tarragona, Catalonia, Spain.

== Geographical context ==
The municipality covers 33.55 km ². The Ebre river is the dividing line with the municipalities of Tivenys and Benifallet to the east. To the west, the land is hilly, and there are recent eastern foothills of the Iberian System. Tramontana noon, adjoins the "Coll del Musso" to Paüls, and the "Colls d'en Gràcia" of the "Tossal de la Cova del Bou", which borders with Alfara de Carles in the west. In the south the border coincides with a stretch of the gorge "la Conca" and then curve towards the north diagonally to the right and near the gorge "del Llop", with Aldover.

Xerta has good communication with Mora d'Ebre, Tortosa and the A-7 autopista; through the regional road (C-12) known as the "Eix de l'Ebre". Zaragoza was formerly with the rail line from the "Val de Zafán", closed in September 1973 and now converted into a greenway (110 km from Bajo Aragon and even Tortosa).

== The Assut of Xerta ==
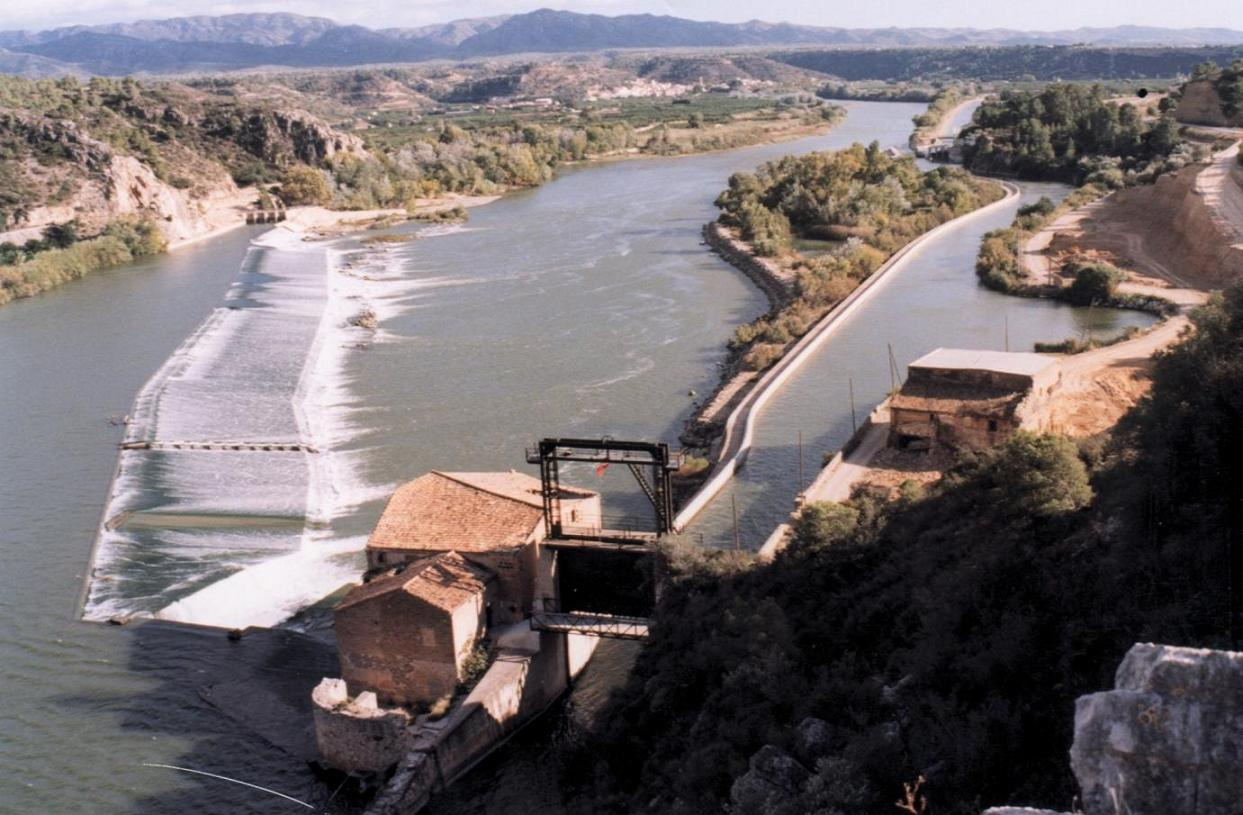
The Assut of Xerta.

The Assut of Xerta is an important monument of hydraulic engineering declared a Cultural Asset of National Interest in the category of Historical Monuments by the Government of Catalonia in 2002. It is located three kilometers upstream from the town. It is a dam built diagonally from side to side along the Ebre River about 375 feet. Its function is to divert water to the irrigation canals of the Right and Left of the Ebre.

== Popular festivals ==
=== Summer Festivities of St. James ===
Summer festivals are dedicated to Saint James (July 25). Among the acts are the most traditional street bulls or paella at the riverside. A curiosity is the "White Night", a night on which people do not go to sleep. It starts with dancing in the outdoor courtyard of the school, culminating with a dance party accompanied by a brass band that runs through the village streets, arousing all xertolins after breakfast. It ends with chasing the bull in the streets which continues throughout the morning.

=== Festival of Saint Martin. ===
Another festival in this town is dedicated to its Patron Saint Martin, held on 11 November. Activities include street bull-chasing, the popular dinner of beef stew, and dancing the Jota Xertolina, a traditional local dance. On the day of the festival, the participants gather in the square at about five o'clock, wearing traditional costumes, to dance the Jota Xertolina.
