= Catalan Way =

2013 political demonstration in Catalonia

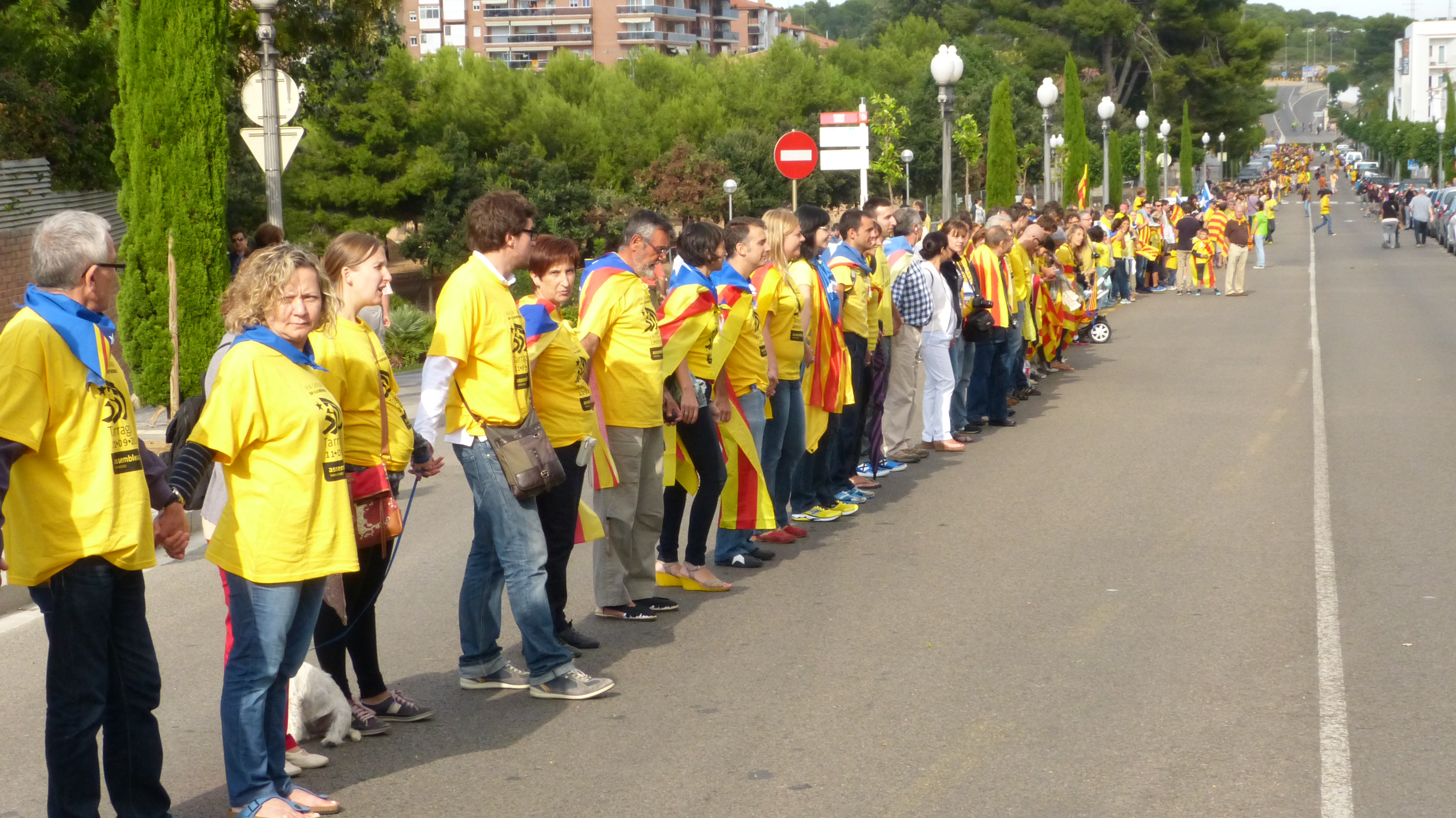
- Catalan Way (section 235) in Via Augusta street, Tarragona
- Date: 11 September 2013
- Location: Catalonia
- Goals: Independence of Catalonia
- Methods: Protest march, street protest

The Catalan Way (Catalan: Via Catalana), also known as the Catalan Way towards Independence (Catalan: Via Catalana cap a la Independència), was a 400-kilometre (250 mi) human chain in support of Catalan independence from Spain. It was organized by the Assemblea Nacional Catalana (ANC) and supported by 14 nongovernmental groups. It took place in Catalonia on 11 September 2013, which is the National Day of Catalonia, known as Diada. Catalonia's Department of the Interior estimated the number of participants at about 1.6 million. The human chain followed the ancient Via Augusta, from Le Perthus (France, Vallespir) to Vinaròs (Spain, Baix Maestrat). According to Carme Forcadell, president of the ANC at that time, it was "a symbol of the unity of Catalan people to achieve national sovereignty".

Plans for the Catalan Way were presented for the first time on 19 June 2013, at the Museu d'Història de Catalunya; the inspiration for these was the 1989 Baltic Way. The presentation included Henn Karits and Ülo Laanoja, two members of the organization which staged the Baltic Way. Three weeks before the event, more than 350,000 people had registered to participate. In total, the organizers mobilized about 1,500 buses and 30,000 volunteers to help organize the event.

Catalan Way 2014 took place the next year.

== Historical precedents ==
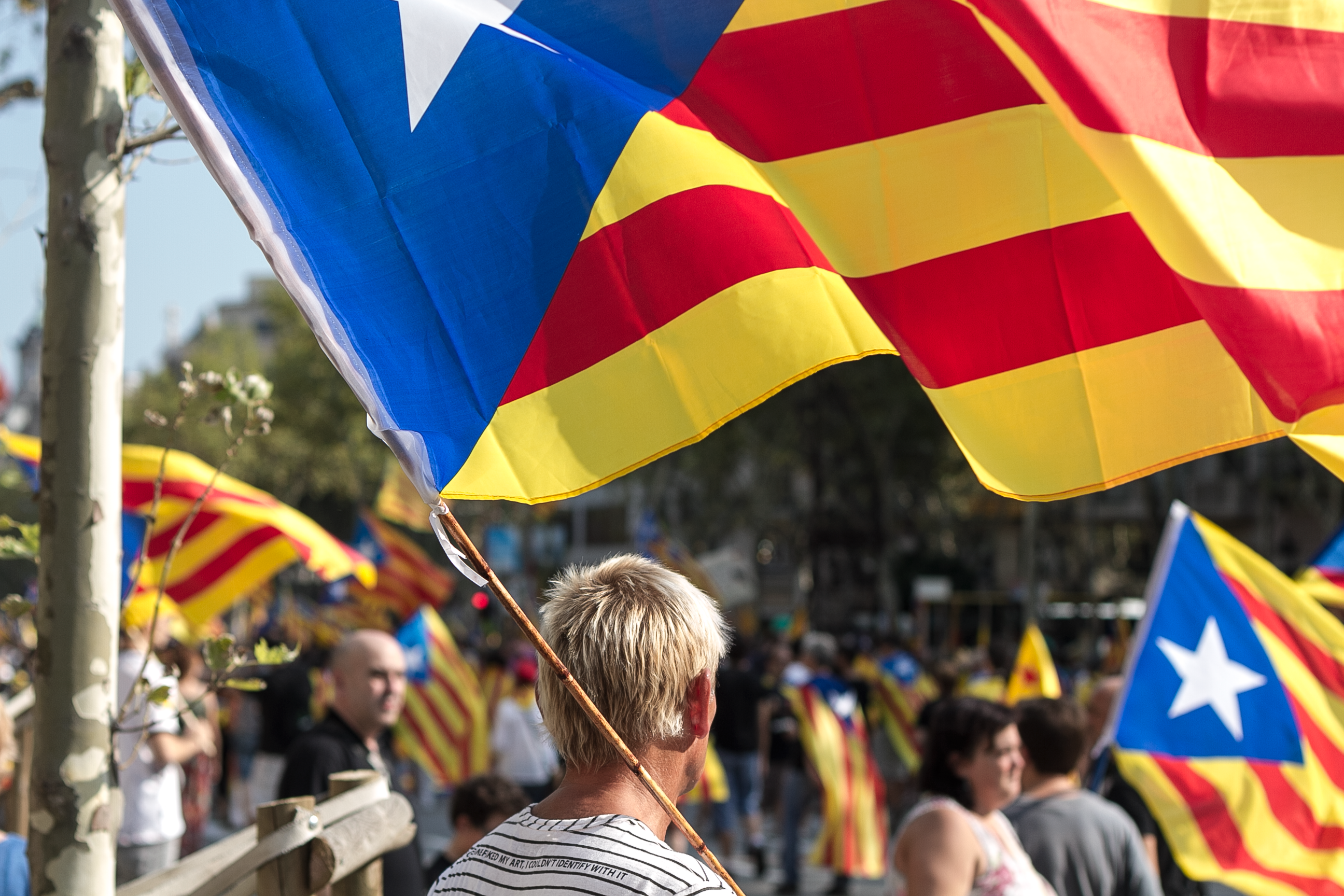
The estelada (Catalan pro-independence flag) in the 2012 Catalan independence demonstration

In 1989, the Baltic Way was organized by the peoples of Estonia, Latvia, and Lithuania, spanning across the three Baltic states which at the time were occupied and annexed by the Soviet Union. This human chain linked the capitals of the three countries demanding the end to the Soviet occupation. During the final stages of the Cold War, the three Baltic countries were able to restore full independence in August 1991. According to the Baltic Way's manifesto, "A common European home can only [be] set up if all European nations are granted a free right to self-determination".

The 2010 Catalan autonomy protest was a demonstration held in central Barcelona on 10 July 2010 against the limits set to the autonomy of Catalonia within Spain, and particularly against a then recent decision of the Spanish Constitutional Court to annul or reinterpret several articles of the 2006 Statute of Autonomy of Catalonia, approved in referendum by 73.9% of the voters. The number of people taking part in the demonstration was estimated at between 1.1 million (according to the local police) and 1.5 million (according to the organisers) Madrid-based newspaper El País estimated the number of demonstrators at 425,000.

Catalonia saw several local referendums for independence take place in hundreds of villages between 13 September 2009 and April 2011, with an overwhelming number of "yes" votes being cast.

The 2012 Catalan independence demonstration, organized by the Catalan National Assembly, argued that Catalonia should become an independent state within the European Union, under the slogan "Catalonia, new state in Europe". The number of participants was estimated at about 1.5 million according to Barcelona's Municipal Police and Catalonia's Department of the Interior, about 2 million according to the organizers, and about 600,000 according to the delegation of the Spanish government in Catalonia.

== Pre-Catalan Way activities ==
=== Registration and previous acts ===
The Catalan Way was presented for the first time on 19 June 2013, at the Museu d'Història de Catalunya. The presentation included Henn Karits and Ülo Laanoja, two members of the organization which staged the Baltic Way.

On 4 July, the National Catalan Assembly (ANC) opened the registering period through its website. More than 22,000 people were registered during the first 24 hours and over 78,000 the first week. Registrations grew steadily since then and, three weeks before the event, more than 350,000 people had already signed in. The southern areas of Catalonia were considered the hardest ones to fill due to being less populated and farther from Barcelona. On 2 September, nine days before the Diada, no section of the Catalan Way was left with low occupancy.

During the summer, some practice runs of the Catalan Way took place in several cities around Catalonia.

=== Response of the political parties ===
Convergència Democràtica de Catalunya (CDC), Esquerra Republicana de Catalunya (ERC) and Candidatura d'Unitat Popular (CUP) expressed their support and participation in the Catalan Way, while Partit dels Socialistes de Catalunya (PSC), Partit Popular (PP) and Ciutadans opposed. Initiative for Catalonia Greens (ICV) asked their activists to join the human chain organized by Procés Constituent to surround La Caixa the same day.

Support of the Catalan political parties to the 2012 demonstration and to the Catalan Way
Political Party	2012	2013
CiU/Convergència Democràtica de Catalunya (CDC)	Yes	Yes
CiU/Unió Democràtica de Catalunya (UDC)	Yes	No
Esquerra Republicana de Catalunya (ERC)	Yes	Yes
Partit dels Socialistes de Catalunya (PSC)	No	No
Partit Popular de Catalunya (PP)	No	No
Initiative for Catalonia Greens (ICV-EUiA)	Yes	No
Ciutadans - Partit de la Ciutadania (C's)	No	No
Candidatura d'Unitat Popular (CUP)	No (Note: Supported an alternative demonstration the same day.)	Yes

Artur Mas, President of the Generalitat of Catalonia and Núria de Gispert, President of the Parliament of Catalonia, decided not to participate for "institutional reasons", although they encouraged the people to participate in the Catalan Way and announced that they would meet with the organizers of the human chain on the same 11 September.

== Chain's path ==
Human chain route in Catalonia

=== In Catalonia ===
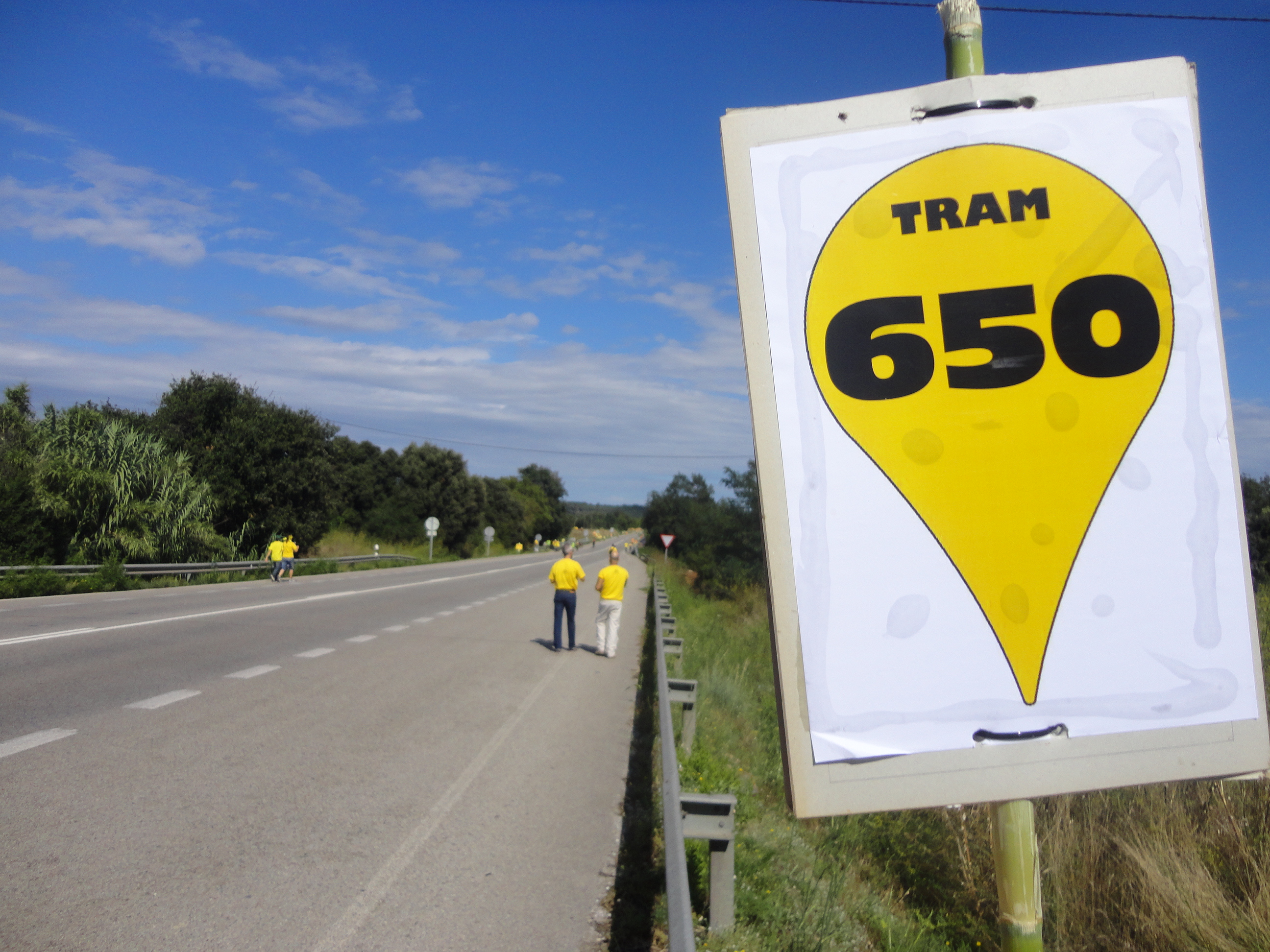
Start of the section 650, in Pontós (Alt Empordà)

The human chain followed the old Via Augusta, crossing the following 86 towns and municipalities (sorted from North to South): Le Perthus, la Jonquera, Pont de Molins, Figueres, Santa Llogaia d'Àlguema, Bàscara, Orriols, Sarrià de Ter, Sant Julià de Ramis, Girona, Fornells de la Selva, Riudellots de la Selva, Tordera, Pineda de Mar, Calella, Sant Pol de Mar, Canet de Mar, Arenys de Mar, Caldes d'Estrac, Sant Vicenç de Montalt, Sant Andreu de Llavaneres, Mataró, Vilassar de Mar, Premià de Mar, El Masnou, Montgat, Badalona, Sant Adrià de Besòs, Barcelona, l'Hospitalet de Llobregat, Esplugues de Llobregat, Sant Just Desvern, Sant Feliu de Llobregat, Molins de Rei, Sant Vicenç dels Horts, Cervelló, Vallirana, Ordal, Cantallops, Sant Cugat Sesgarrigues, Olèrdola, Vilafranca del Penedès, Santa Margarida i els Monjos, la Ràpita, l'Arboç, Castellet i la Gornal, Bellvei, el Vendrell, Roda de Berà, Creixell, Clarà, Torredembarra, Altafulla, Tarragona, Reus, Riudoms, Montbrió del Camp, Mont-roig del Camp, l'Hospitalet de l'Infant, l'Ametlla de Mar, El Perelló, l'Ampolla, Camarles, l'Aldea, Amposta, Sant Carles de la Ràpita and Alcanar.

In Barcelona, the path ran along several main streets, such as avinguda Diagonal, plaça de Sant Jaume and Eixample.

=== Branches out of Catalonia ===
Two extensions of the Catalan Way, one up to Le Boulou, France, and the other one down to Vinaròs, Valencian Community, were made. The Northern Catalonia ANC territorial assembly was responsible to extend the Catalan Way from Pertús to el Voló, and several civic and political Valencian organizations, coordinated by Acció Cultural del País Valencià, prepared an extension from Vinaròs.

=== International Catalan Way ===
The Foreign Assemblies of the ANC, in collaboration with the Catalan Communities Abroad and Catalans al Món, organized more than 116 Catalan Ways carried out mainly between 1 August and 11 September 2013 in major cities around the world "to support the democratic independence process of Catalonia". More than 8,000 Catalans and supporters of Catalonia's independence participated in the International Catalan Way.

- Americas: Toronto, Vancouver and Montreal (Canada), Atlanta, Boston, Boulder, Chicago, Cincinnati, Dallas, Houston, Independence, Los Angeles, Miami, Minneapolis, New York City, Raleigh, San Francisco, Seattle and Washington, D.C. (United States), Guadalajara, Mexico City, Puebla and Tulum (Mexico), Managua (Nicaragua), Panama City (Panama), San José (Costa Rica), Asunción (Paraguay), Bogotá and Medellín (Colombia), Buenos Aires, Castelar, Córdoba, Paranà and Rosario (Argentina), Curitiba, Rio de Janeiro and São Paulo (Brazil), Lima (Peru), Montevideo (Uruguay), Quito (Ecuador) and Santiago (Chile).
- Europe: Andorra la Vella (Andorra), Athens (Greece), Bergen, Oslo and Trondheim (Norway), Berlin, Cologne, Frankfurt, Hamburg, Mannheim and Munich (Germany), Brussels (Belgium), Budapest (Hungary), Copenhagen (Denmark), Cork and Dublin (Ireland), The Hague (Netherlands), Dubrovnik and Zadar (Croatia), Geneva, Lausanne and Zurich (Switzerland), Gothenburg and Stockholm (Sweden), Helsinki (Finland), Lisbon (Portugal), Ljubljana (Slovenia), Edinburgh, London and Manchester (United Kingdom), Luxembourg (Luxembourg), Paris, Paris-Eurodisney, Lyon and Toulouse (France), Prague (Czech Republic), Reykjavík (Iceland), Alghero, Rome and Venice (Italy), Sarajevo (Bosnia and Herzegovina), Szczecin (Poland) and Vienna (Austria).
- Africa: Johannesburg (South Africa), Mbour (Senegal) and Serekunda (Gambia).
- Asia: Doha (Qatar), Dubai (United Arab Emirates), Jerusalem (Israel), Bangkok (Thailand), Hong Kong, Beijing, Guangzhou, Shanghai and Shenyang (China), Everest and Pokhara (Nepal), Seoul (South Korea) and Tokyo (Japan).
- Oceania: Auckland and Wellington (New Zealand), Brisbane, Melbourne, Perth and Sydney (Australia)
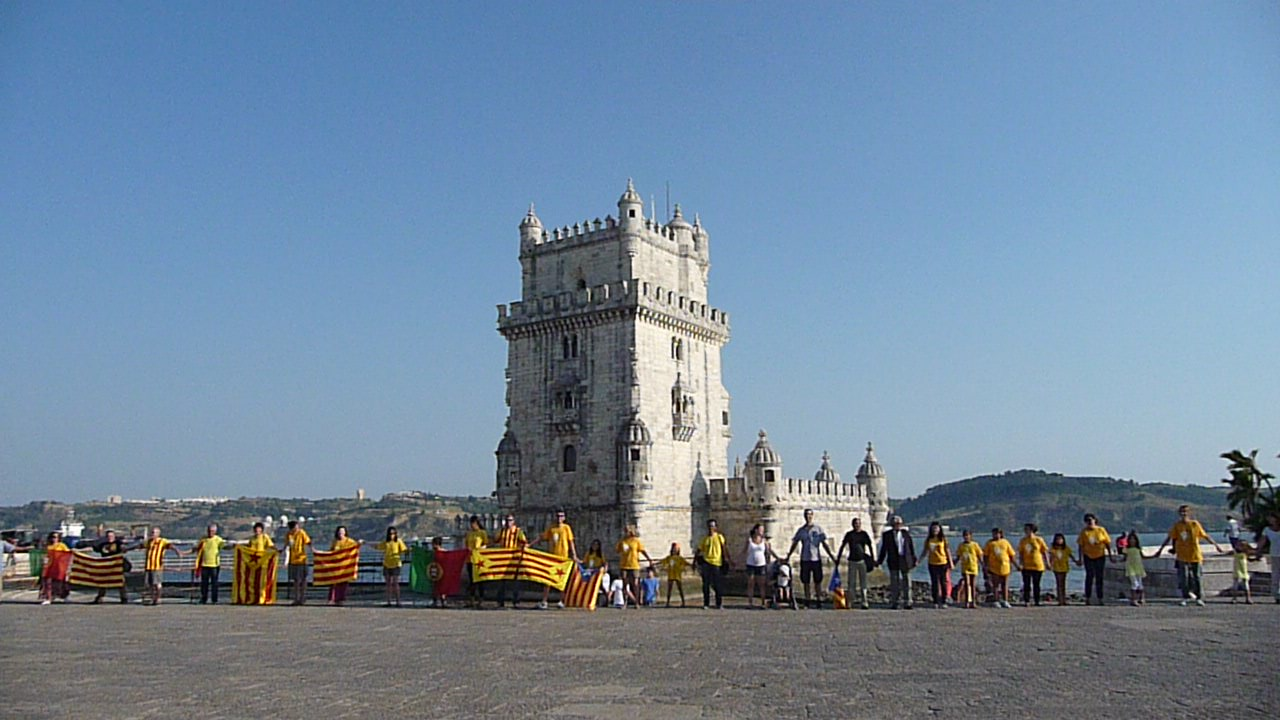
Previous Catalan Way in Lisbon, on 30 August

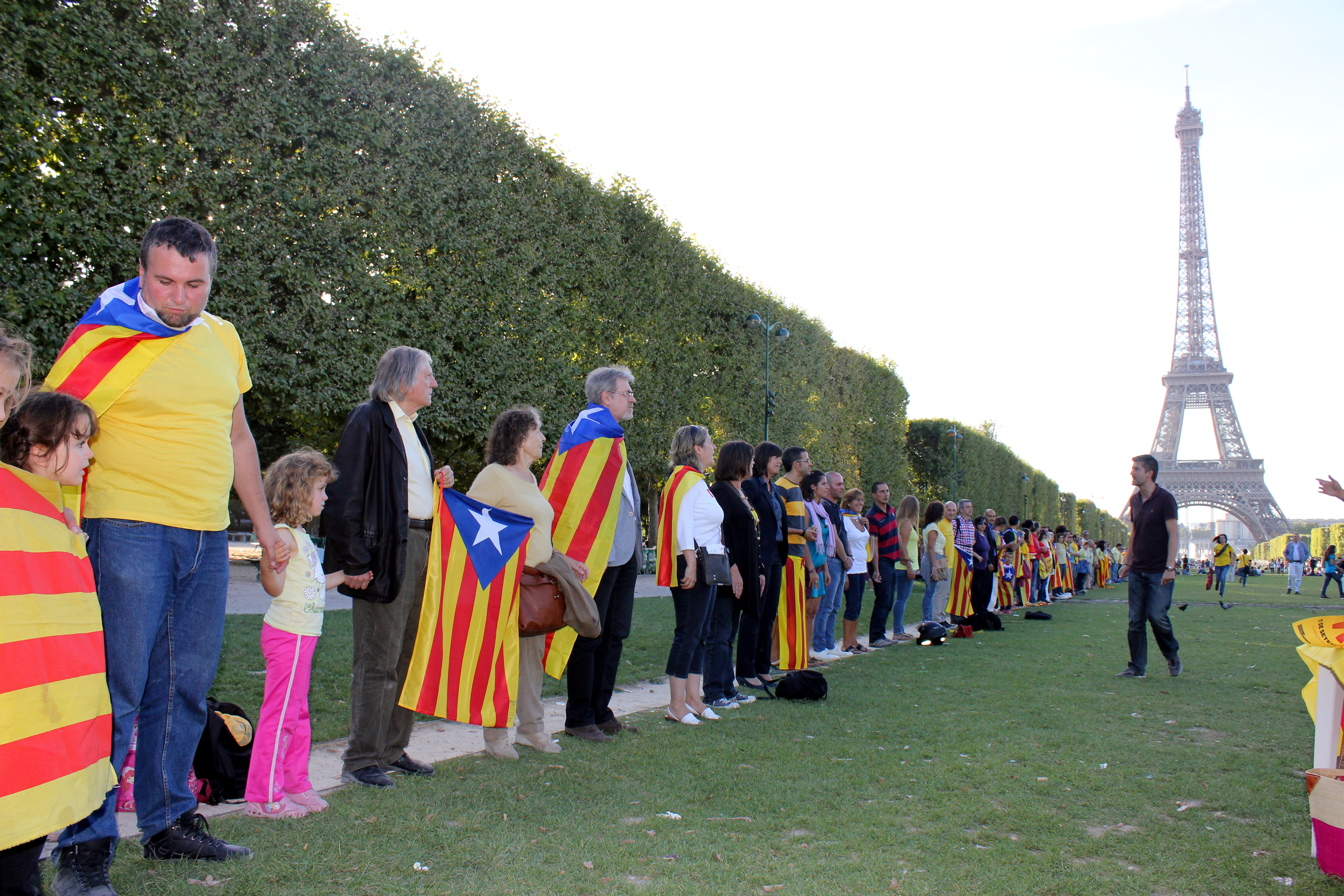
Previous Catalan Way in Paris, on 2 September

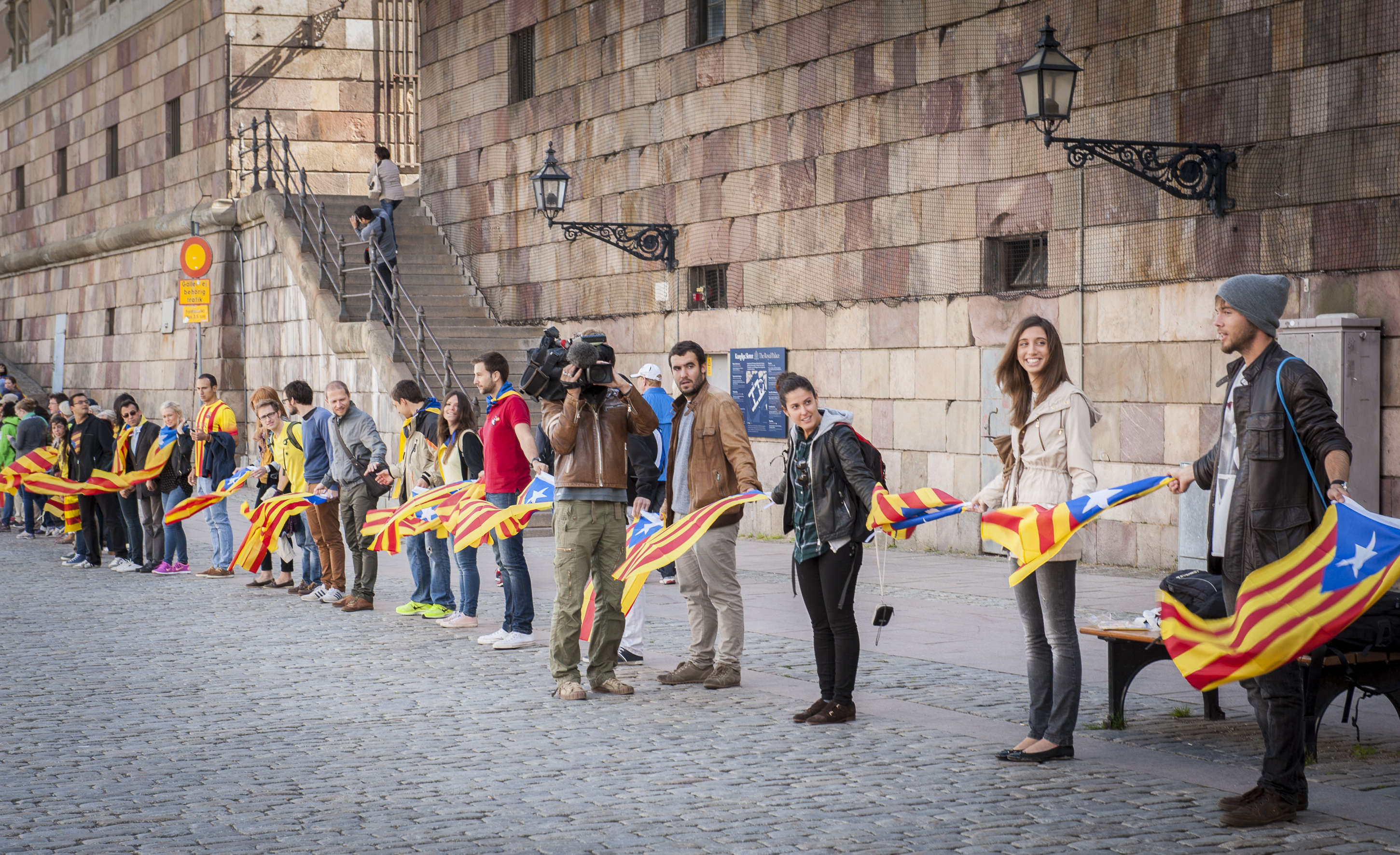
Previous Catalan Way in Stockholm, on 31 August

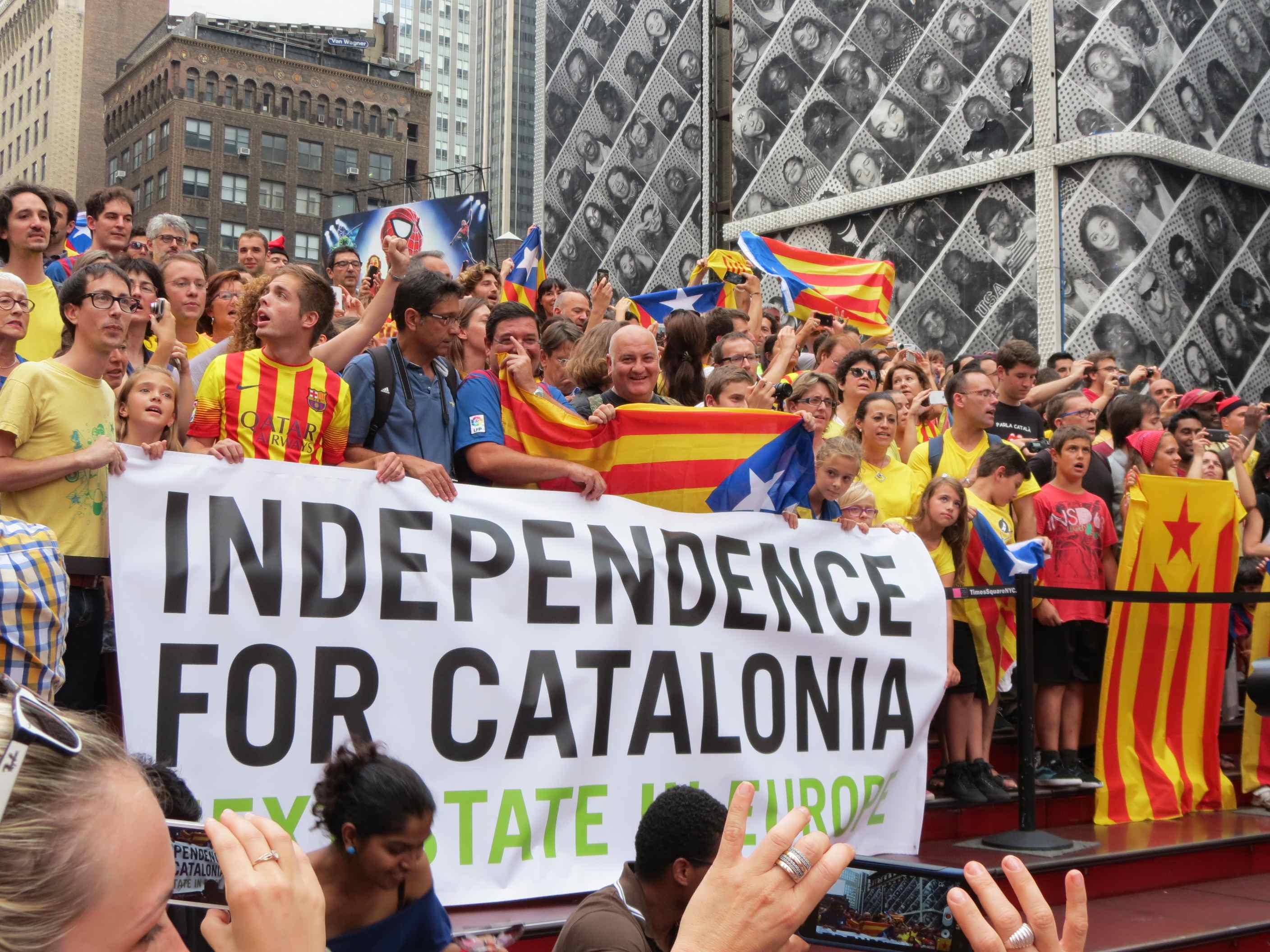
Pro-independence protest in Times Square, New York City, on 31 August

== Consequences ==
=== Reactions against ===
Initially, 12-O Moviment Cívic called for a demonstration in the Sagrada Família square to circle around this monument, show their support for the "unity of Spain" and "break the pro-independence chain". However, the Ministry of the Interior of the Government of Catalonia ruled that this demonstration could not be at the same time and in the same location for security reasons. This, together with the limited support of the anti-independence political parties, led the organizers to call off the event and invited unionist Catholics to go to the Temple to pray and postponed an answer to the Catalan Way on 12 October, the Fiesta Nacional de España.

Fifteen far-right people holding pre-constitutional, Falange, National Alliance flags assaulted the official ceremony of the Catalan National Day in the Catalan Government Centre in Madrid. They attacked those present, including the MP Josep Sánchez i Llibre, caused damage to furniture and threw pepper spray, shouting "No nos engañan, Cataluña es España" ("They don't deceive us, Catalonia is Spain"). Medical services treated a person with mental breakdown, another for bruising, and a third for eye irritation. Among the wounded there were elderly people and a five-year-old girl.

=== Political consequences ===
The Catalan National Assembly claimed that the day after the Catalan Way the Catalan government should set the date and the question of self-determination referendum in Catalonia, that "should be able to answer with a yes or no". The Minister of the Presidency and spokesman of the Government of Catalonia Francesc Homs said the day after the Catalan way that "before the end of the year there should be a date and a question".

The Deputy Prime Minister of Spain, Soraya Sáenz de Santamaría, said the day after that the executive had an obligation "to listen to all Spaniards", both "the people coming out" and the "silent majority" that "stay at home", who also "entitled" to ensure "for their freedoms and their views". For its part, the Spain's Minister of Foreign Affairs José Manuel García-Margallo, admitted that the Catalan Way was a "success of call, organization, logistics and communication", although he said that Spain would never accept a referendum agreed with Catalonia.

=== International reaction ===
European Commission spokesmen showed "great respect" for the Catalan Way and said they were "aware of its importance", although they recalled that the EU executive "can not interfere" in the internal affairs of member states.

Latvia's PM Valdis Dombrovskis said it would recognize Catalonia as independent state, if declared in a legitimate process. Mr. Dombrovskis said: "If there is a clear will of the people and need for a referendum, we need to take that into account and seek means to make it real" [...] "Provided there is legitimacy of the process, I would say, theoretically, why not?". Latvia, however, considers the question an internal matter of Spain and PM's press secretary latter said that PM had tried to remain neutral instead of showing support to the Catalan cause. Spanish government reacted asking to call the Latvian ambassador in Madrid to explain the prime minister's statements.

On 14 September Lithuania's PM Algirdas Butkevičius said about Catalonia: "Each country must find its own path and has the right to self-determination. [...] I welcome all peaceful ways of expressing solidarity and self-determination". He also said he was "very pleased" that the Lithuanian example "inspire" the Catalan independence clamor.

After the pressure of Spanish diplomacy, Lithuania's Foreign Ministry posted a statement expressing "concern over the tendentious and erroneous interpretation" by the Spanish press over the Lithuanian position. The statement said, "The Soviet occupation of the Baltic nations cannot be compared with the situation in Spain. Spain is the democratic country, a member of the European Union, our close partner in the EU and NATO." It said all domestic matters in Spain "should be resolved according to democratic and legal measures that exist within the country, respecting the Constitution.".

== Following years ==
The Catalan Way was followed in the succeeding years by the Catalan Way 2014, the Free Way to the Catalan Republic (2015) and Go ahead, Catalan Republic (2016).

== Gallery ==
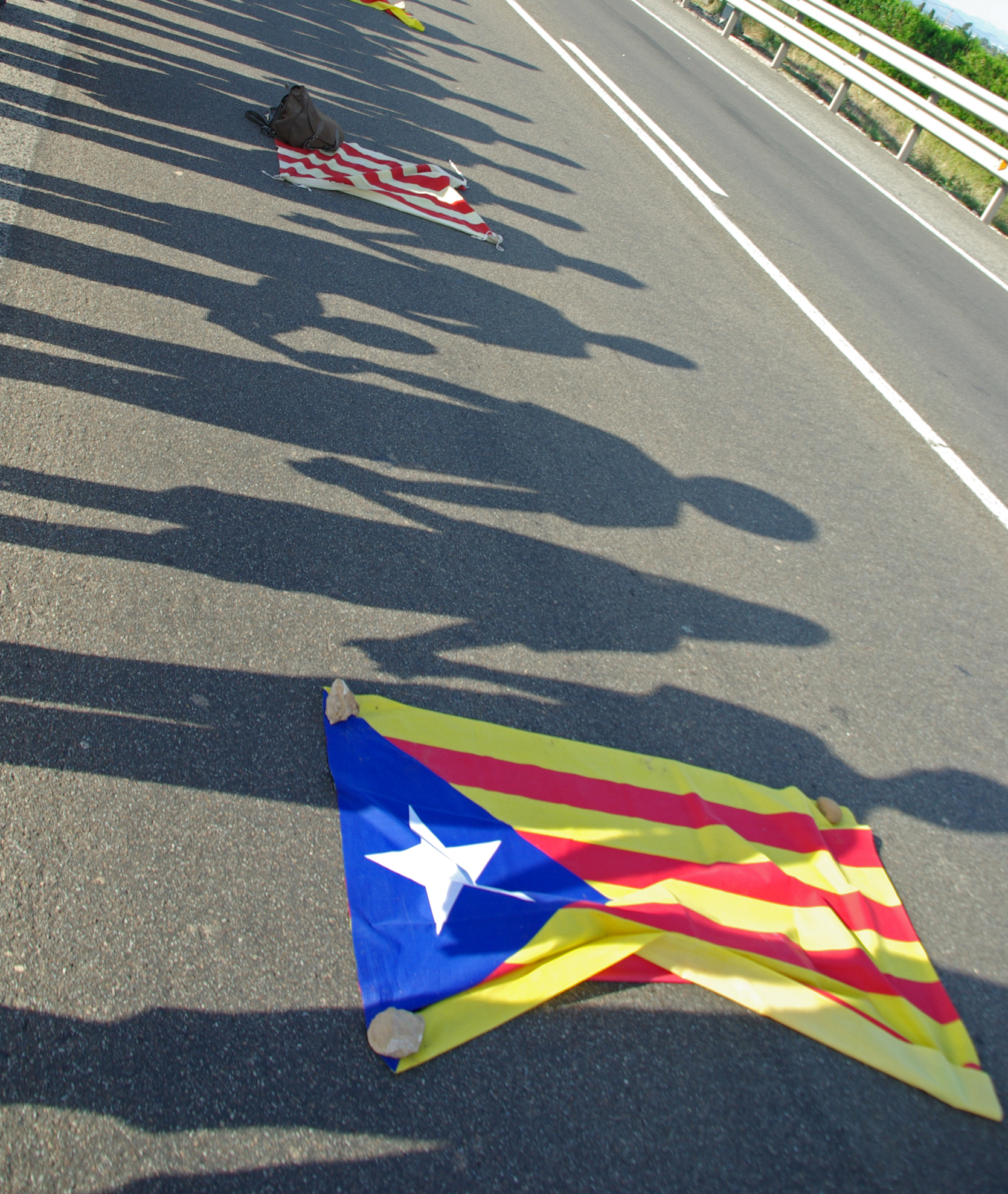
Catalan Way in Sant Carles de la Ràpita

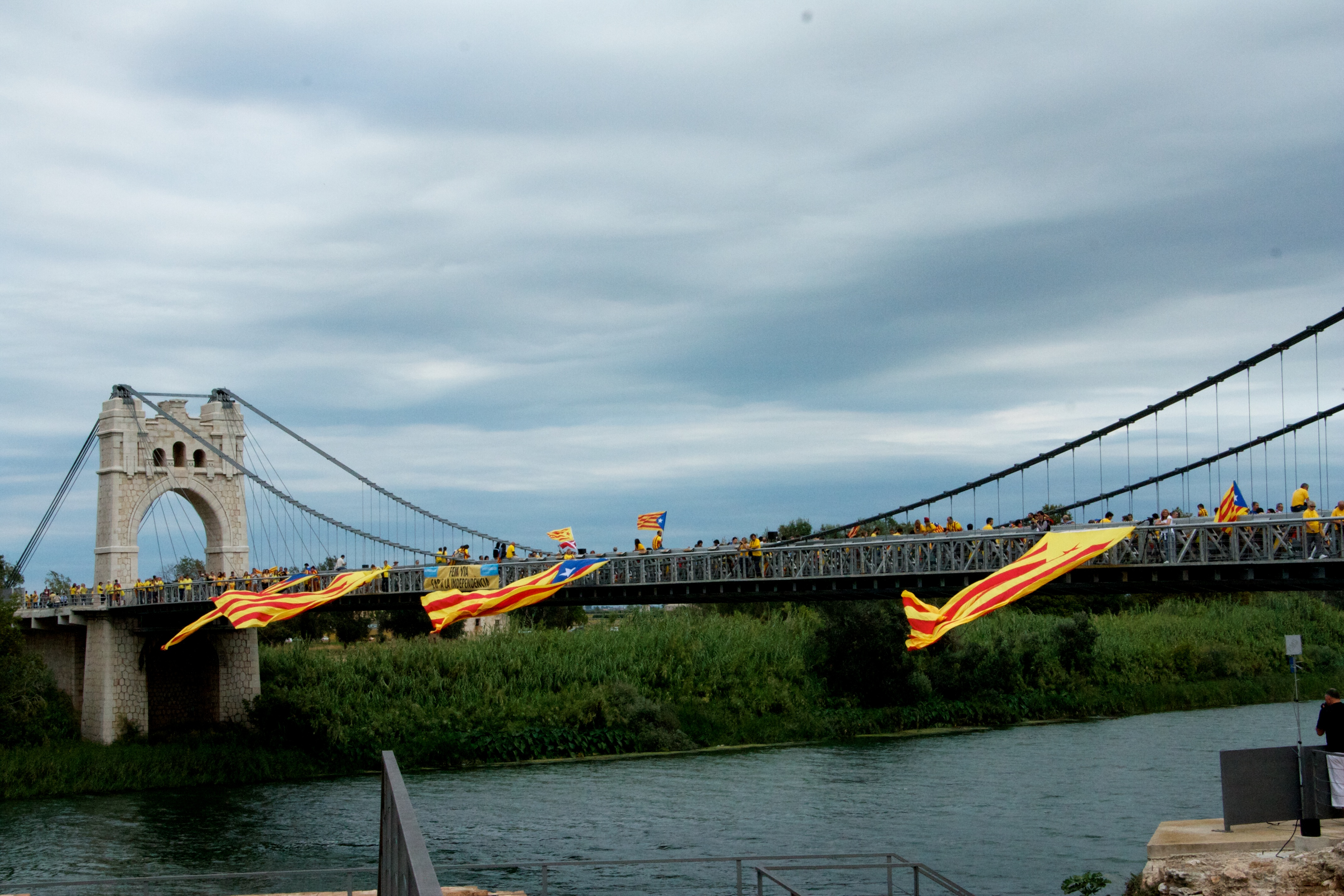
Catalan Way in Amposta

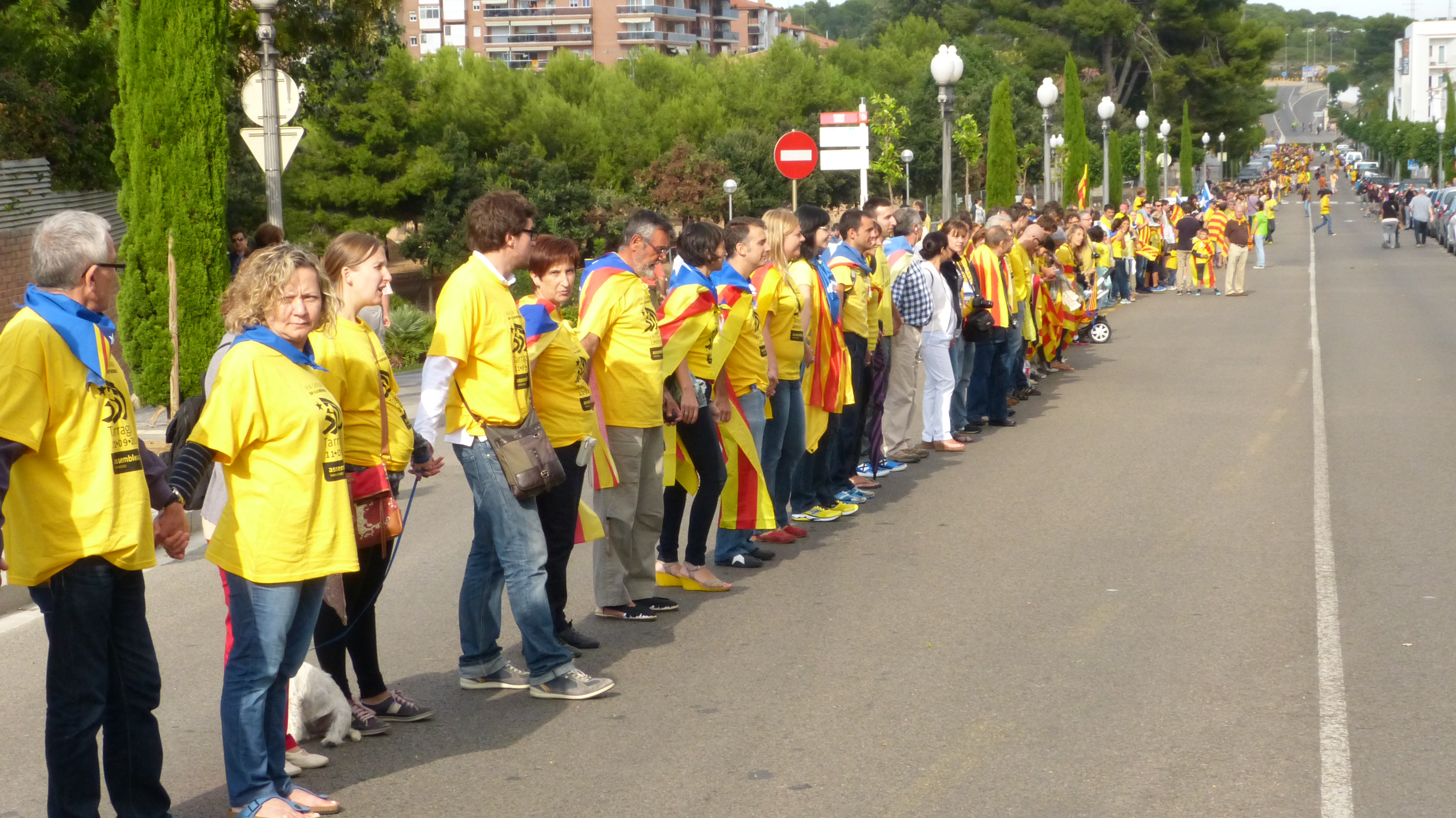
Catalan Way in Tarragona

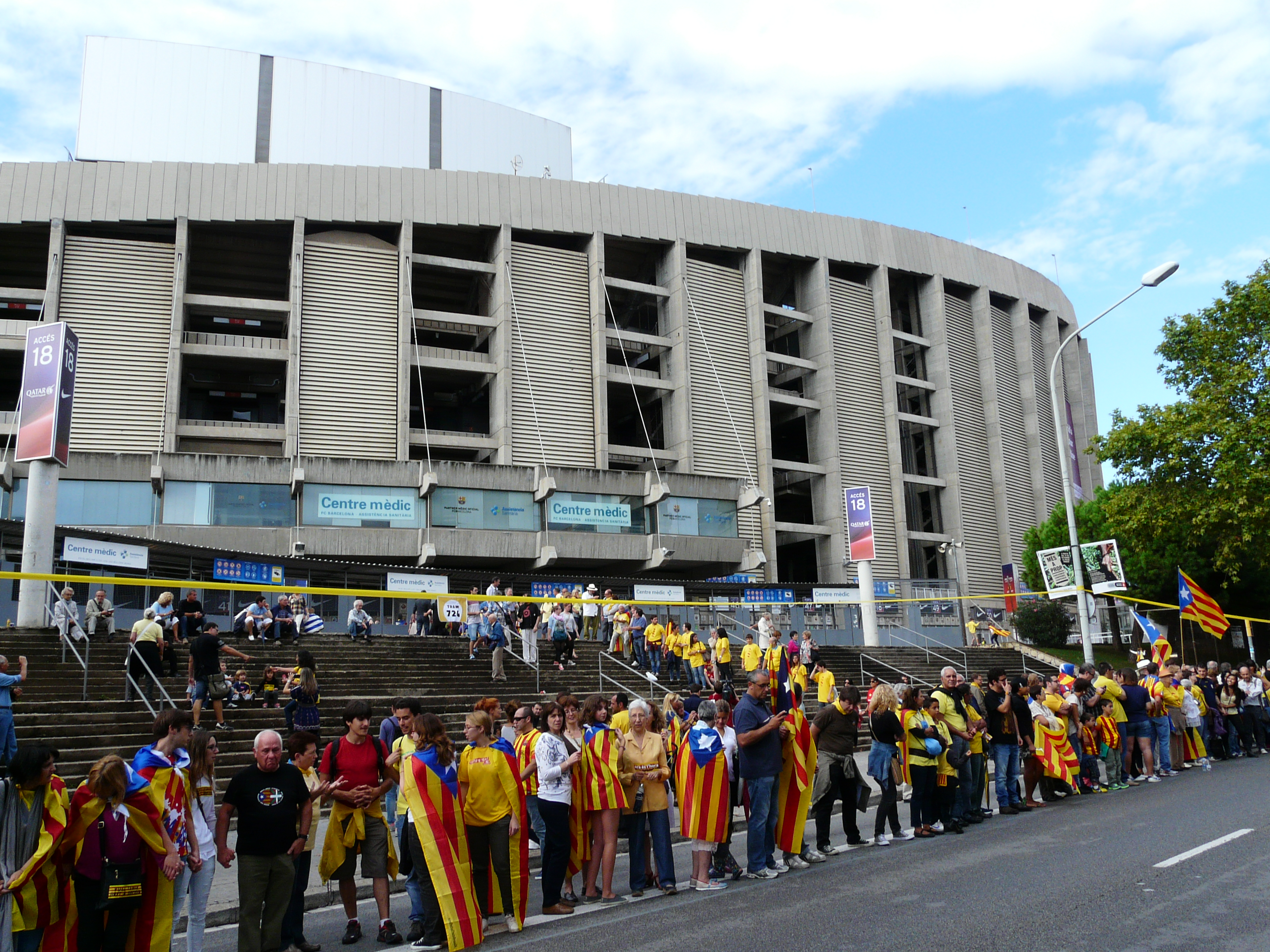
Catalan Way at the Camp Nou

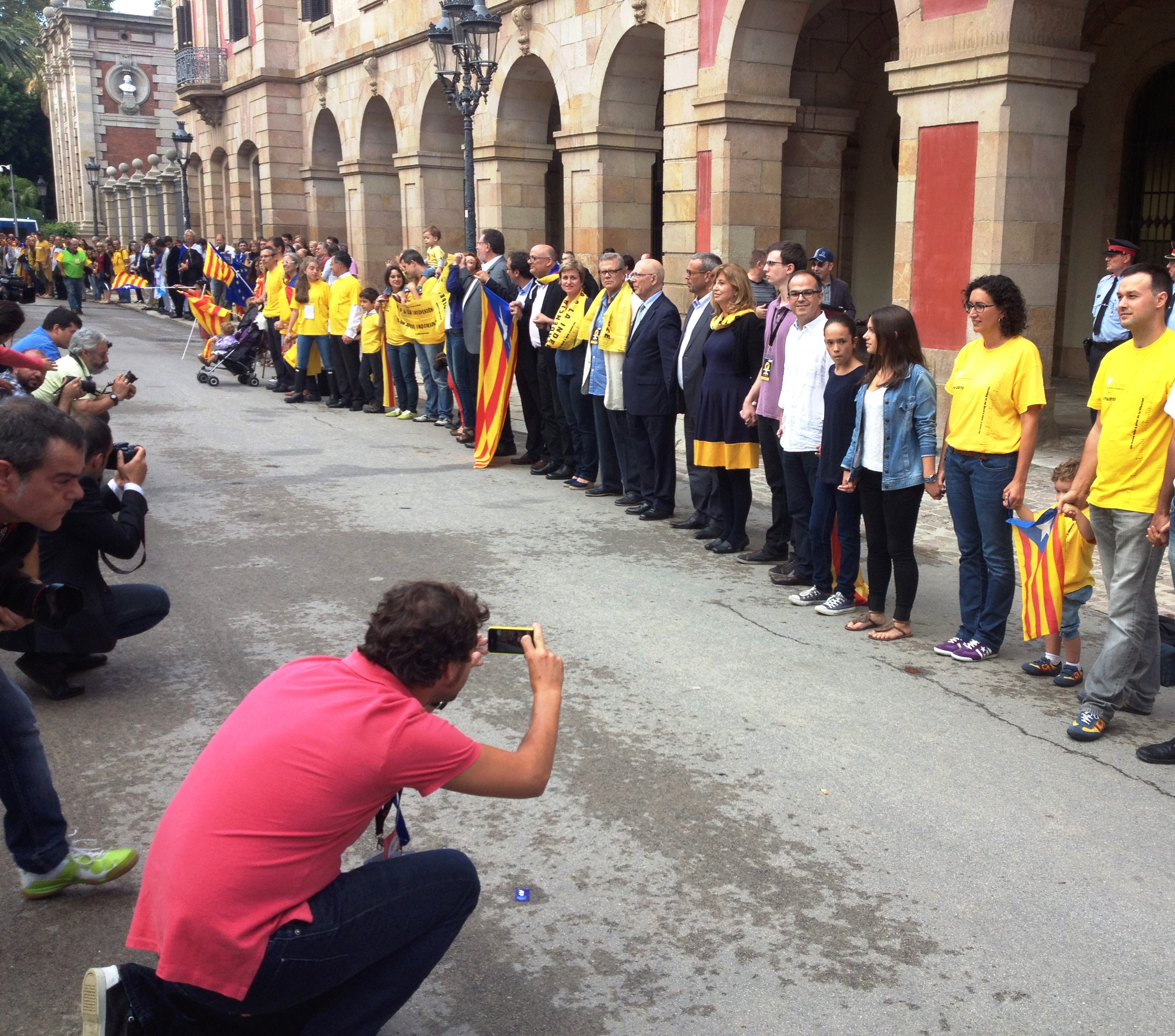
Catalan Way at the Parliament of Catalonia

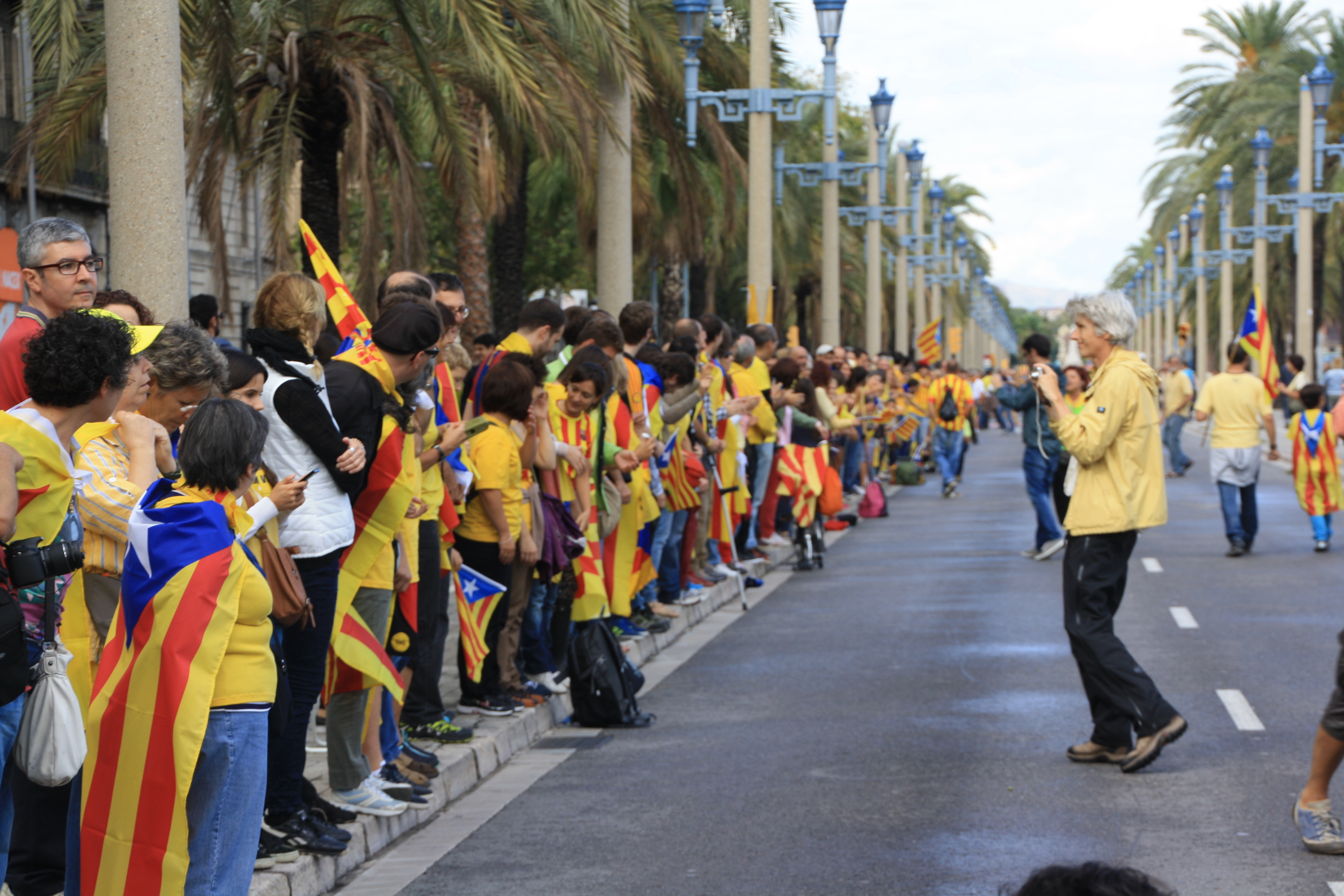
Catalan Way on Colom Avenue, Barcelona

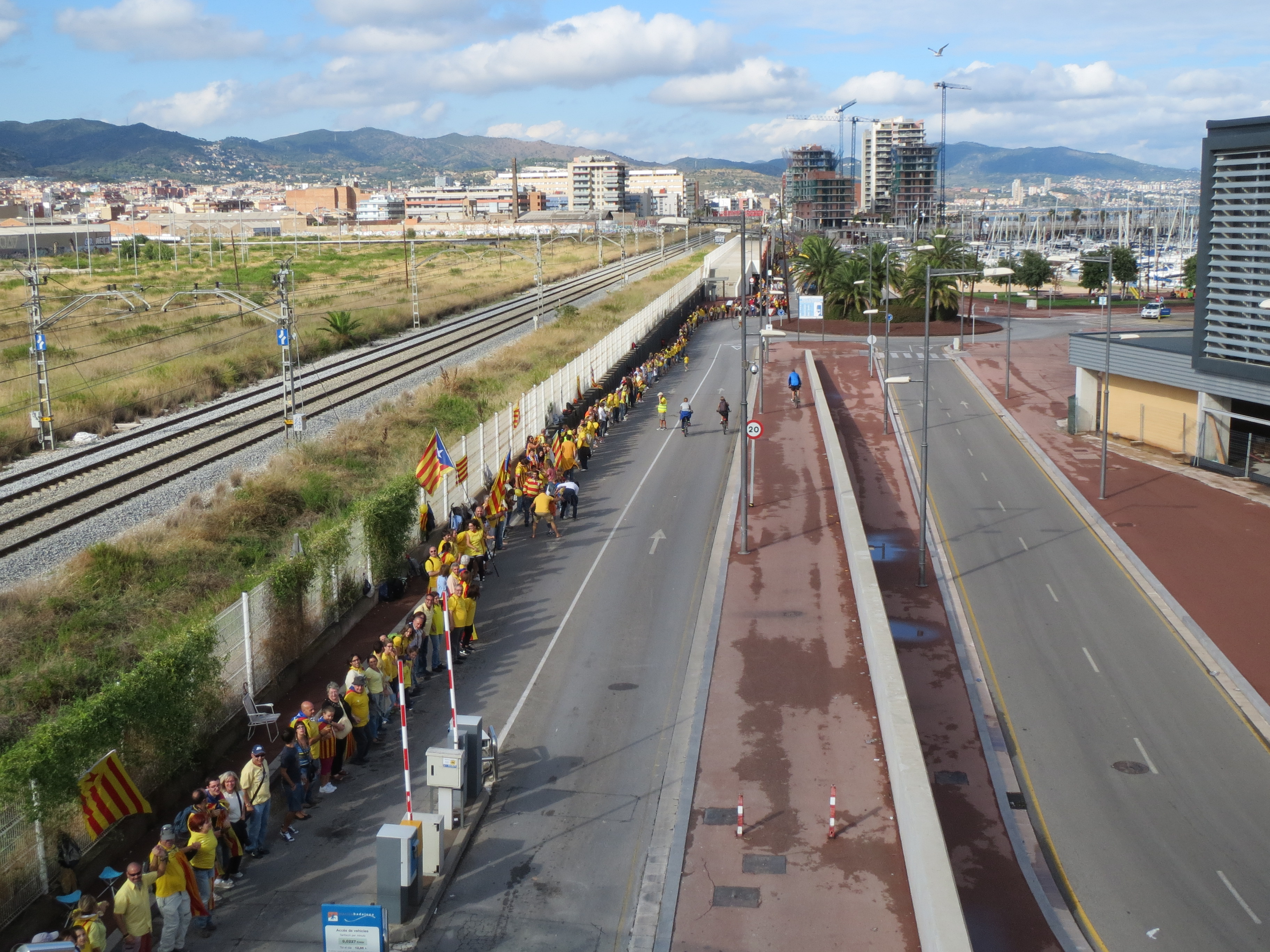
Catalan Way in Badalona

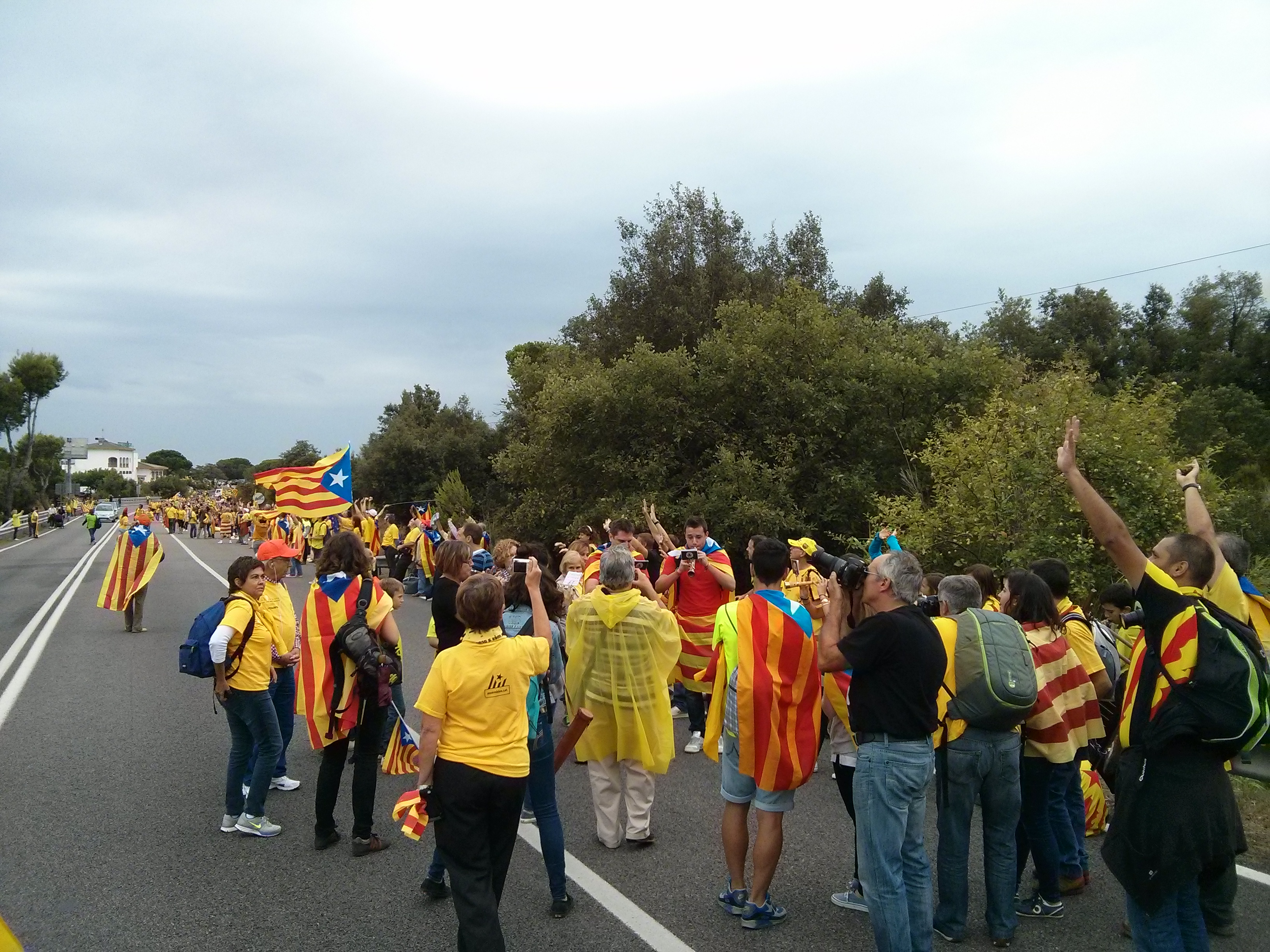
Catalan Way in Palafolls

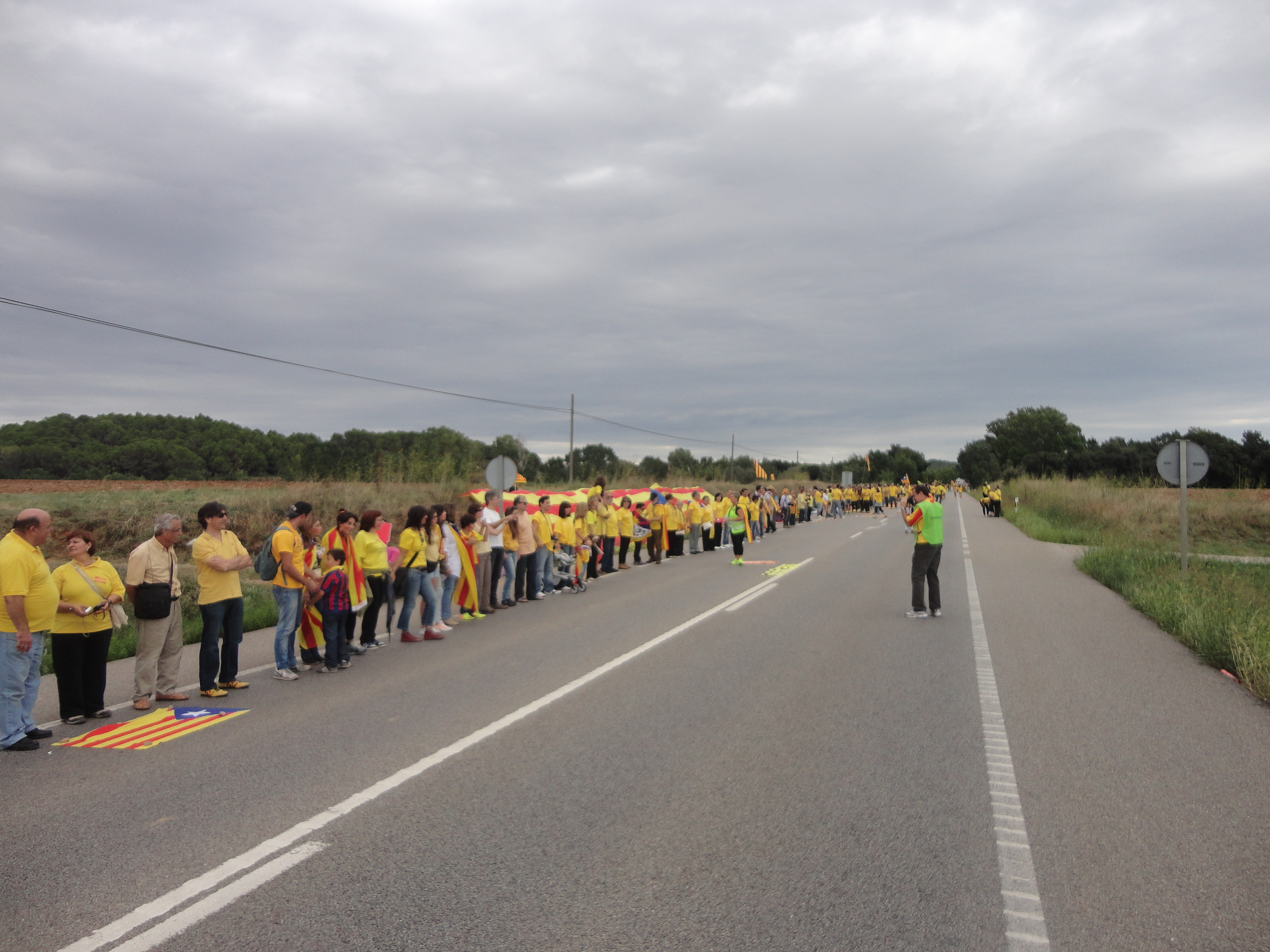
Catalan Way in Pontós

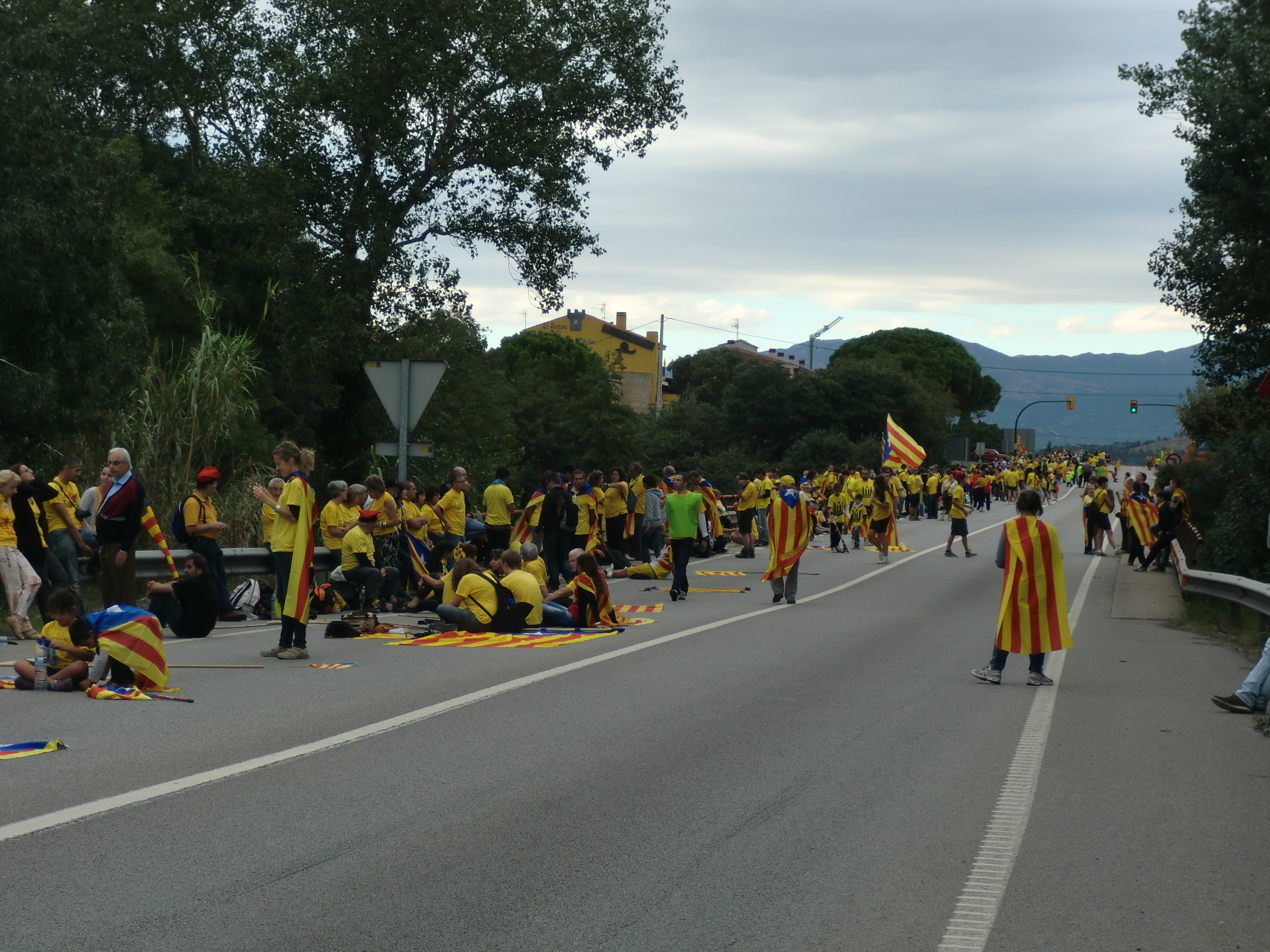
Catalan Way in Pont de Molins

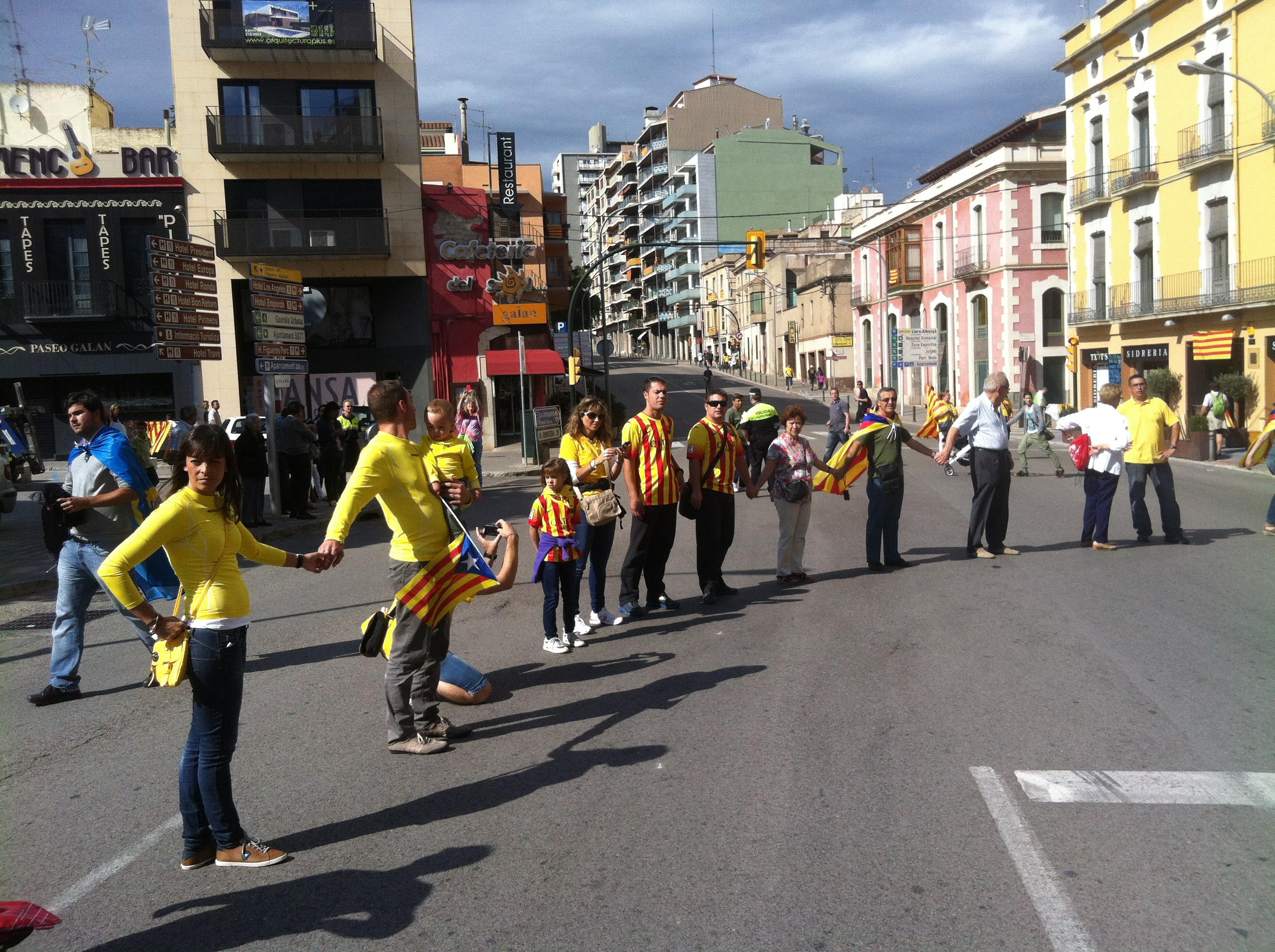
Catalan Way in Figueres

== See also ==
- Baltic Way
- Human Chain for Basque Self-determination, 2014
- Human Chain for Basque Self-determination, 2018
- Hong Kong Way
- Human chain (politics)
