= Baix Ebre =

Coordinates: 40°51′00″N 0°33′19″E

- Comarca
- Flag Coat of arms

- Country: Spain
- Autonomous community: Catalonia
- Region: Terres de l'Ebre
- Province: Tarragona
- Capital: Tortosa
- Municipalities: List: L'Aldea, Aldover, Alfara de Carles, L'Ametlla de Mar, L'Ampolla, Benifallet, Camarles, Deltebre, Paüls, El Perelló, Roquetes, Tivenys, Tortosa, Xerta

Government
  - Body: Baix Ebre Comarcal Council
  - President: Antoni Gilabert (ERC)

Area
  - Total: 1,002.6 km^{2} (387.1 sq mi)

Population (2014)
  - Total: 80,637
  - Density: 80.428/km^{2} (208.31/sq mi)
- Demonym
- Time zone: UTC+1 (CET)
  - Summer (DST): UTC+2 (CEST)
- Website: www.baixebre.cat

Baix Ebre (Western Catalan: [ˈbaʃ ˈeβɾe], "Lower Ebro") is a comarca (county) on the coast in southern Catalonia. It is located in the region of Terres de l'Ebre, and its capital is Tortosa.

== Municipalities ==
Municipality	Population (2014)	Area km^{2}
L'Aldea	4,376	35.2
Aldover	940	20.2
Alfara de Carles	395	63.9
L'Ametlla de Mar	7,303	66.9
L'Ampolla	3,479	35.6
Benifallet	703	62.4
Camarles	3,514	25.2
Deltebre	11,831	107.4
Paüls	596	43.8
El Perelló	3,155	100.7
Roquetes	8,287	136.9
Tivenys	876	53.5
Tortosa	33,932	218.5
Xerta	1,250	32.4
• Total: 14	80,637	1,002.6
