= Camarles =

- Municipality
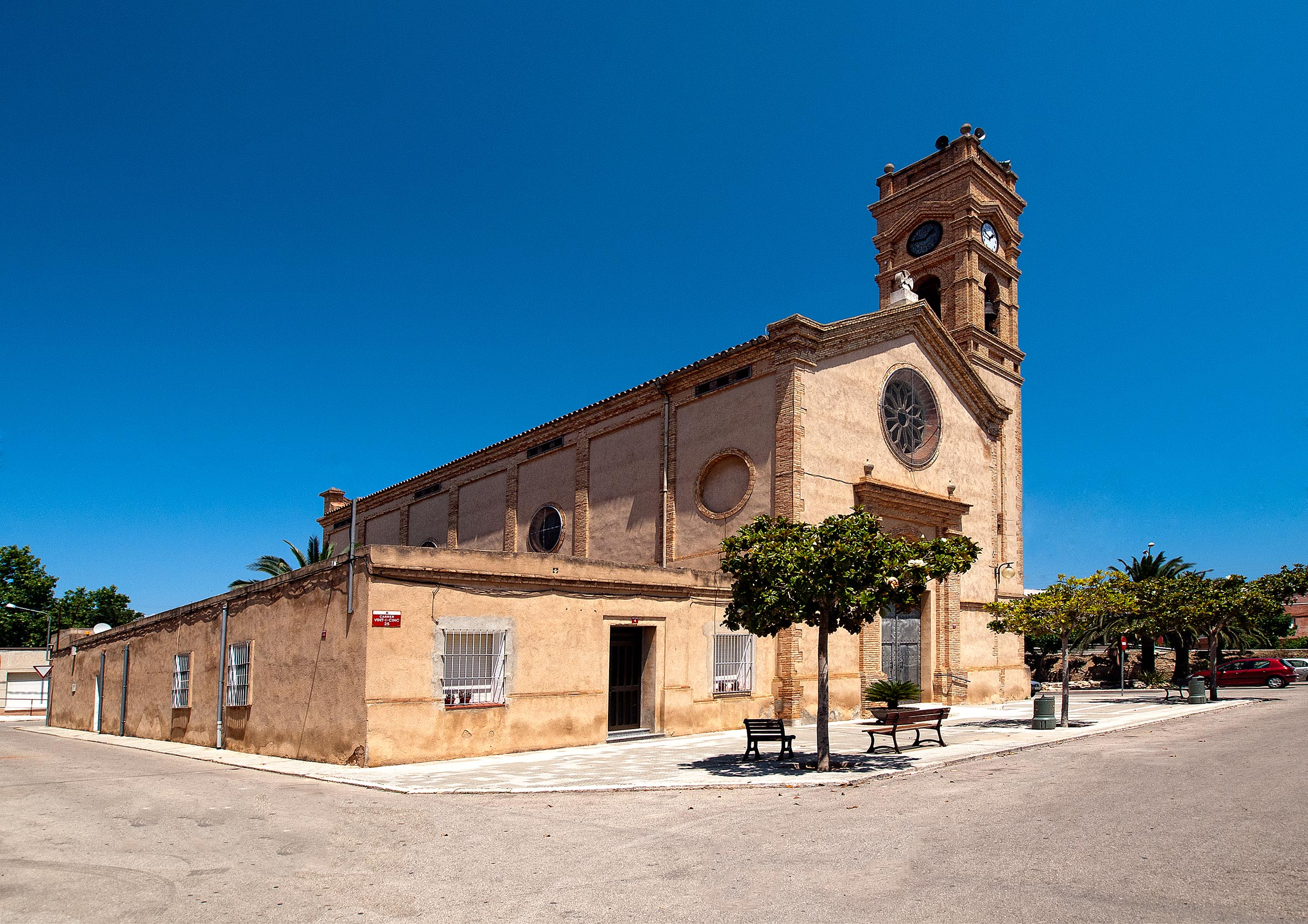
- Camarles parish church

- Coat of arms

- Location in Catalonia
- Coordinates: 40°46′25″N 0°40′21″E
- Country: Spain
- Community: Catalonia
- Province: Tarragona
- Comarca: Baix Ebre

Government
  - Mayor: Josep Antoni Navarro Serra (2019)

Area
  - Total: 25.2 km^{2} (9.7 sq mi)
- Elevation: 13 m (43 ft)

Population (2025-01-01)
  - Total: 3,465
  - Density: 138/km^{2} (356/sq mi)
- Demonym(s): Camarlenc, camarlenca
- Website: camarles.cat

Camarles (Catalan pronunciation: [kaˈmaɾles]) is a municipality in the comarca of the Baix Ebre, Catalonia, Spain. Established in 1978 from parts of Tortosa municipality, it lies in the eastern part of the comarca, near the Ebre delta’s headwaters. It has a population of 3,465 (register office, 2025).

The town is accessed via the N-340 road, which connects to Tortosa and links to the AP-7 autopista through l'Aldea to the south or l'Ampolla to the north.
