= Terres de l'Ebre =

Region of Catalonia

Coordinates: 40°55′41″N 0°31′00″E

Terres de l'Ebre within Catalonia

Terres de l'Ebre (Catalan pronunciation: [ˈtɛrəz ðə ˈleβɾə], in English 'Ebre Lands') is the south-westernmost of the eight regions (vegueries) defined by the Regional Plan of Catalonia. It has a population of 182,231 as of 2022, placing it second to last in terms of population. The region includes the comarques of Baix Ebre, Montsià, Terra Alta and Ribera d'Ebre. It is located in the lower course of the Ebre river, and its northern coastal limit is marked by the Coll de Balaguer, a natural limit with the Camp de Tarragona region.

It is a UNESCO Biosphere Reserve since 2013 being the second territory in Catalonia to be awarded with this recognition, the first one being the Montseny Massif.

Its capital, following the law of vegueries, is the city of Tortosa.

== Demographics ==
Comarques	Population (2022)
Baix Ebre	79,394
Montsià	69,908
Terra Alta	11,294
Ribera d'Ebre	21,635

== See also ==
- Ilercavonia
