= Deltebre =

- Municipality
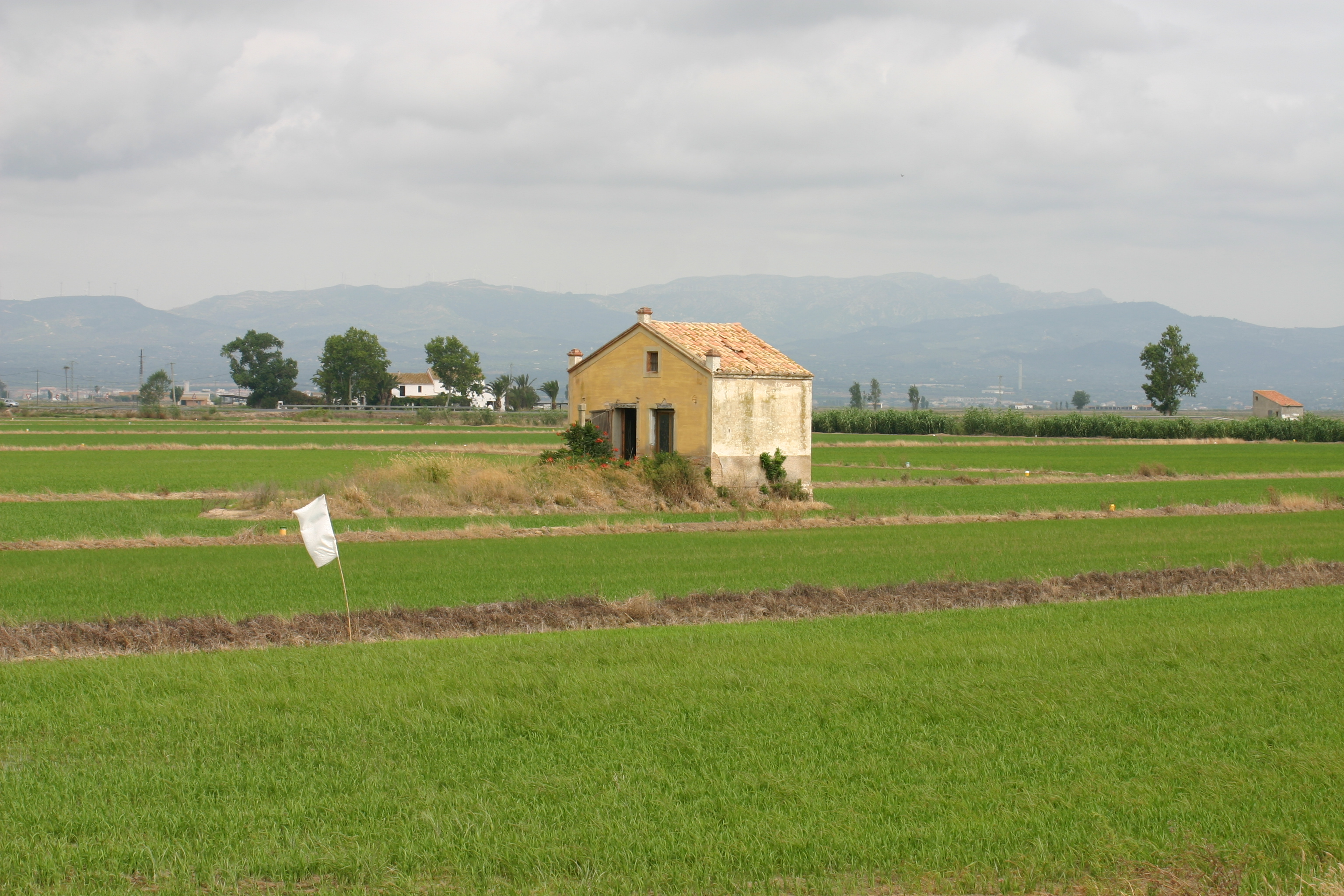

- Coat of arms

- Location in Catalonia Deltebre (Catalonia) Deltebre (Spain)
- Coordinates: 40°43′18″N 0°43′23″E
- Country: Spain
- Community: Catalonia
- Province: Tarragona
- Comarca: Baix Ebre

Government
  - Mayor: Lluis Soler Panisello (2015)

Area
  - Total: 107.4 km^{2} (41.5 sq mi)
- Elevation: 6 m (20 ft)

Population (2025-01-01)
  - Total: 12,041
  - Density: 112.1/km^{2} (290.4/sq mi)
- Demonym: Deltebrenc
- Postal code: 43580
- Website: deltebre.cat

Deltebre (Catalan pronunciation: [delˈteβɾe]) is a municipality in the comarca of the Baix Ebre in Catalonia, Spain. It was created in 1977 when the communities of Jesús i Maria and la Cava seceded from the municipality of Tortosa. It has a population of 12,041 (register office, 2025).

The municipality occupies much of the northern half of the Ebre Delta, on the left bank of the river. The cultivation of rice and tourism are the major industries. The T-340 road links the municipality with Tortosa and the rest of the comarca; barges used to cross the river to Sant Jaume d'Enveja, however since 2010 there is a bridge between both shores of the Ebre, lo Passador.

== Twin towns ==
- Reinosa, Spain
