= L'Aldea =

- Municipality
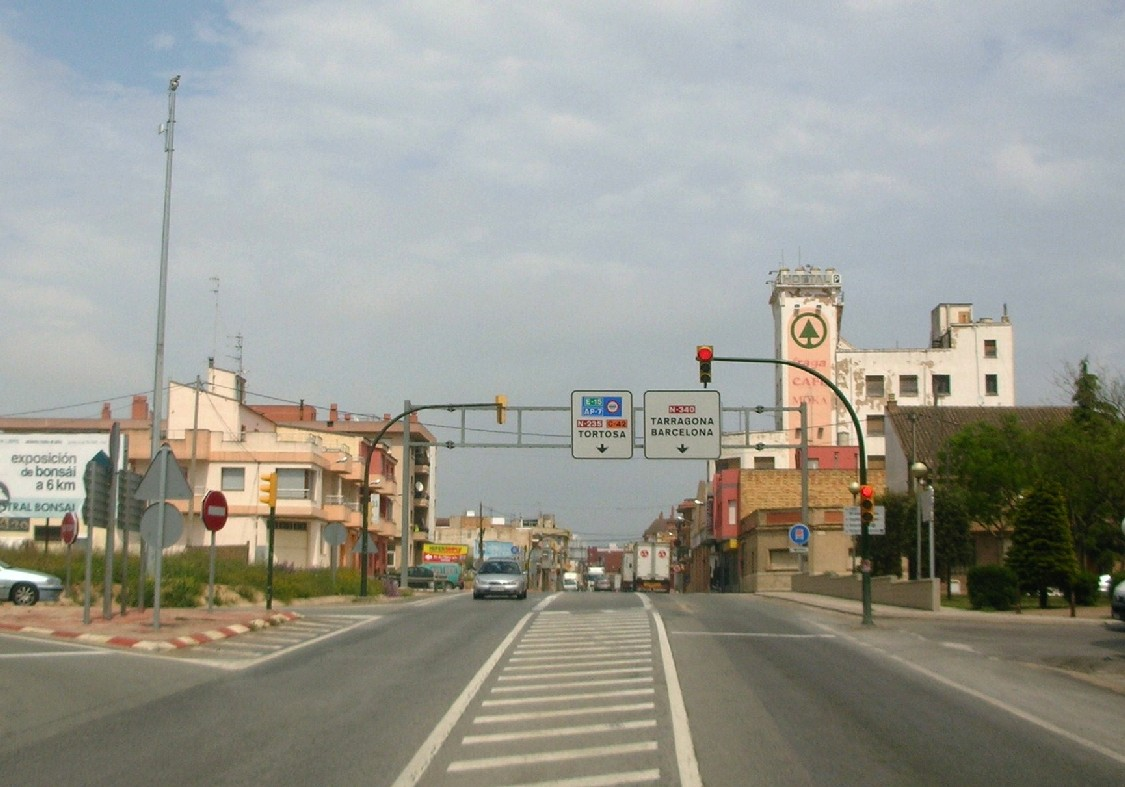
- Main road (N-340)

- Flag Coat of arms

- Location in Catalonia L'Aldea (Catalonia) L'Aldea (Spain)
- Coordinates: 40°44′44″N 0°36′48″E
- Country: Spain
- Autonomous Community: Catalonia
- Province: Tarragona
- Comarca: Baix Ebre

Government
  - Mayor: Xavier Royo Franch (2019)

Area
  - Total: 35.2 km^{2} (13.6 sq mi)
- Elevation: 9 m (30 ft)

Population (2025-01-01)
  - Total: 4,657
  - Density: 132/km^{2} (343/sq mi)
- Demonyms: Aldeà, aldeana
- Website: www.laldea.org

L'Aldea (Catalan pronunciation: [lalˈdea]) is a municipality in the comarca of the Baix Ebre in Catalonia, Spain. It was created in 1983 from parts of the municipality of Tortosa. It has a population of 4,657 (register office, 2025).

It is situated on the left bank of the Ebre at the start of the delta. The town is served by the A-7 autopista and the N-340 road, and has a station on the Renfe railway line between Tarragona and Valencia.
