= Tivenys =

- Municipality
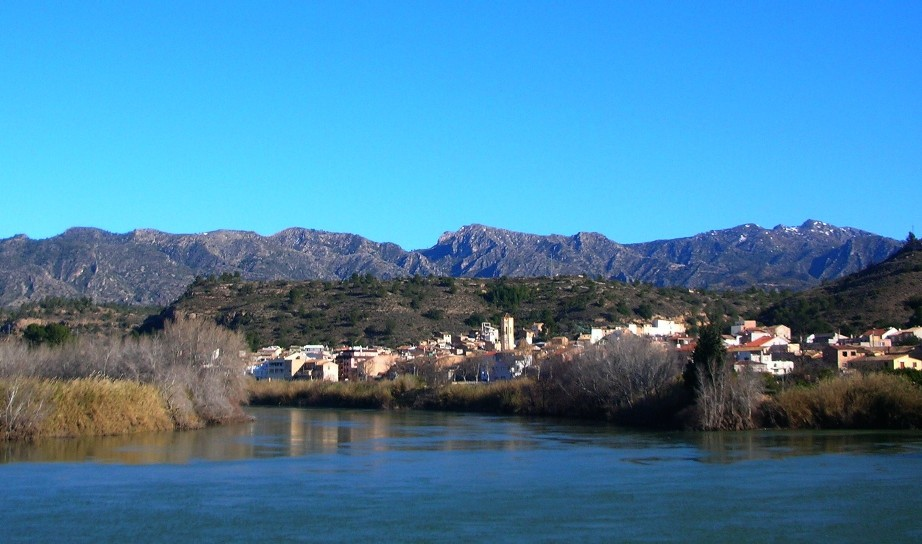
- Tivenys over the Ebre river, the Serra de Cardó mountain range in the background

- Coat of arms

- Location in Catalonia Tivenys (Catalonia) Tivenys (Spain)
- Coordinates: 40°54′34″N 0°30′48″E
- Country: Spain
- Autonomous Community: Catalonia
- Province: Tarragona
- Comarca: Baix Ebre

Government
  - Mayor: Eladi Galbe Mauri (2019)

Area
  - Total: 53.5 km^{2} (20.7 sq mi)
- Elevation: 13 m (43 ft)

Population (2025-01-01)
  - Total: 948
  - Density: 17.7/km^{2} (45.9/sq mi)
- Demonym(s): Tivenysenc, tivenysenca
- Website: www.tivenys.altanet.org

Tivenys (Catalan pronunciation: [tiˈβeɲs]) is a municipality in the comarca of the Baix Ebre in Tarragona province Catalonia, Spain. It is situated on the left bank of the Ebro river among the mountains of the Cardó-Boix Massif. It has a population of 948 (register office, 2025).

== Notable people ==
- José Alcoverro (1835-1908), sculptor.
