= Ebro =

River in the Iberian Peninsula

Ebro Catalan: Ebre
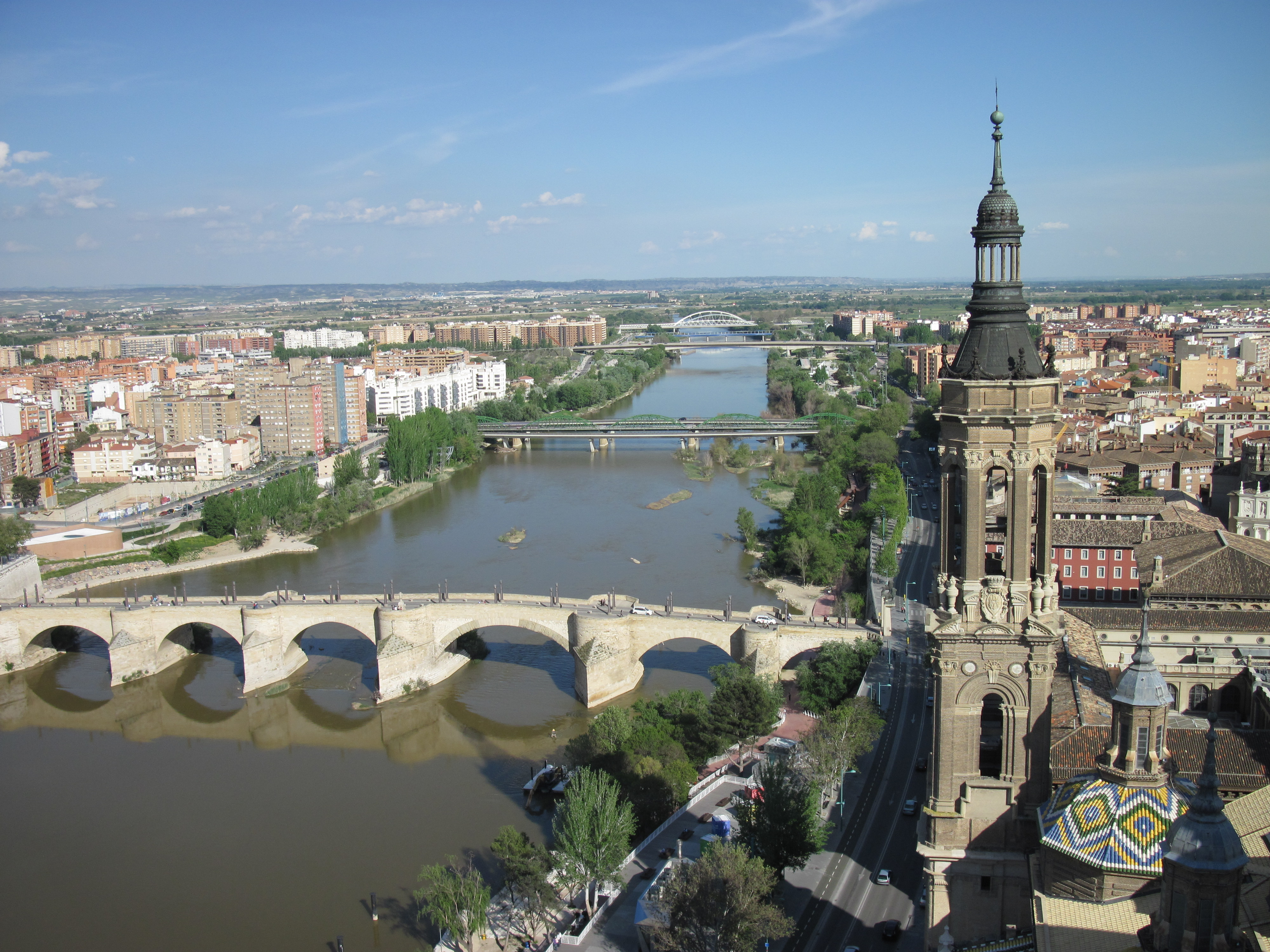
- The Ebro River in Zaragoza

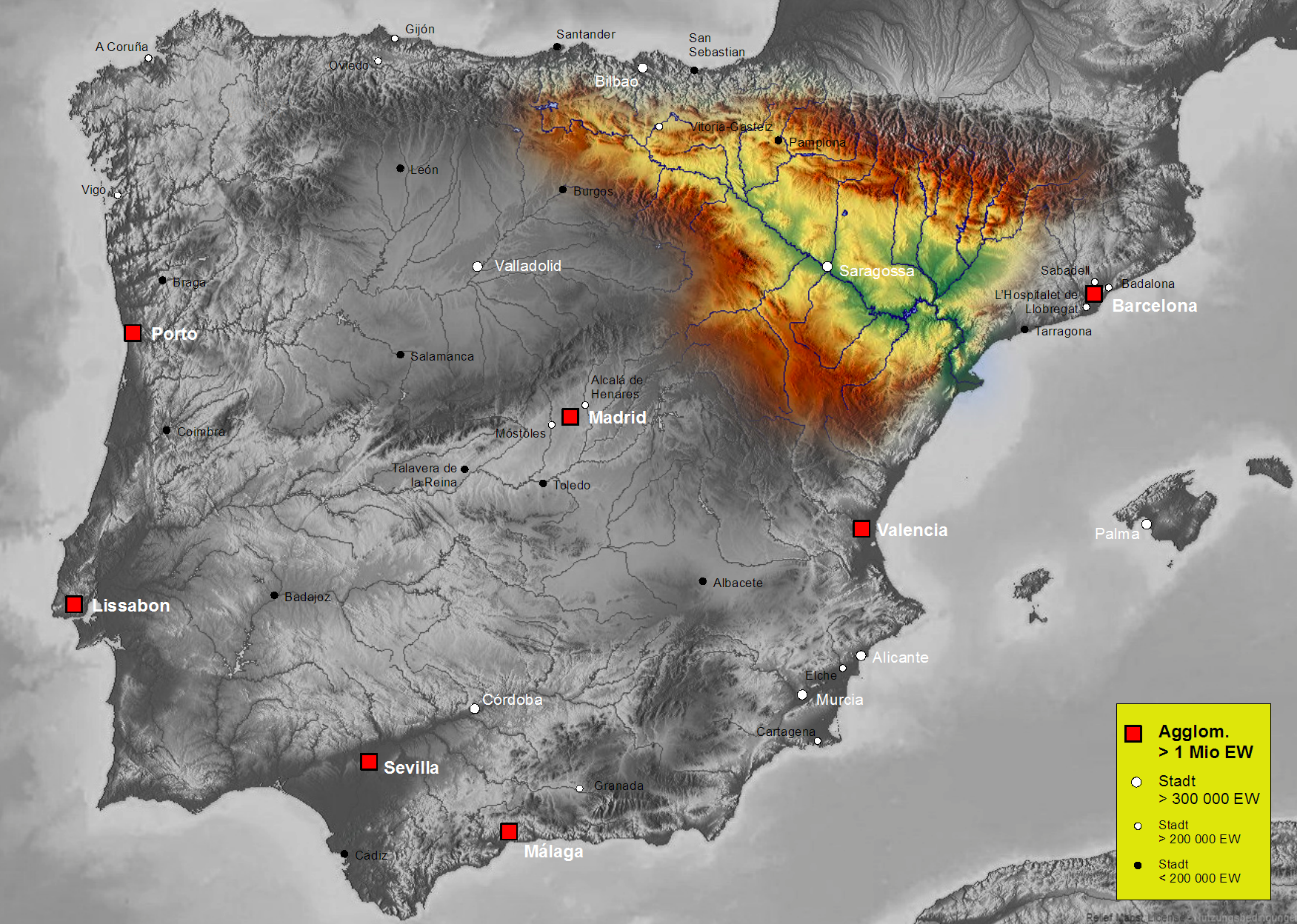
- The Ebro river basin
- Native name: Ebro (Spanish); Ebre (Catalan)

Location
- Country: Spain
- Region: Cantabria, Castile and León, Basque Country (autonomous community), La Rioja, Navarre, Aragon, Catalonia, Valencian Community

Physical characteristics
- Source
  - location: Fontibre, Cantabria, Spain
  - coordinates: 43°2′21″N 4°24′11″W
  - elevation: 1,980 m (6,500 ft)
- Mouth
  - location: Mediterranean Sea, Province of Tarragona, Catalonia, Spain
  - coordinates: 40°43′12″N 0°51′47″E
  - elevation: 0 m (0 ft)
- Length: 930 km (580 mi)
- Basin size: 80,093 km^{2} (30,924 sq mi)
- Discharge
  - location: mouth
  - average: 426 m^{3}/s (15,000 cu ft/s)

Basin features
- River system: Ebro basin
- Tributaries
  - left: Nela, Jerea, Bayas, Zadorra, Ega, Arga, Aragón, Gállego, Cinca, Segre
  - right: Oca, Oja, Tirón, Najerilla, Iregua, Cidacos, Alhama, Jalón, Huerva, Martín, Guadalope, Matarranya

The Ebro (Spanish and Basque [ˈeβɾo]; Catalan: Ebre, Western: [ˈeβɾe], Eastern: [ˈeβɾə]) is a river of the north and northeast of the Iberian Peninsula, in Spain. It rises in Cantabria and flows 930 kilometres (580 mi), almost entirely in an east-southeast direction. It flows into the Mediterranean Sea, forming a delta in the Terres de l'Ebre region, in southern Catalonia. In the Iberian peninsula, it ranks second in length after the Tagus and second in discharge volume, and drainage basin, after the Douro. It is the longest river entirely within Spain; the other two mentioned flow into Portugal.

The Ebro flows through many cities (Spanish: ciudades): (Note: City in Spain is much more liberally applied than city status in the United Kingdom, France, Germany and Italy.) Reinosa in Cantabria; Frías and Miranda de Ebro in Castile and León; Haro, Logroño, Calahorra, and Alfaro in La Rioja; Tudela in Navarre; Alagón, Utebo, and Zaragoza in Aragon; and Flix, Móra d'Ebre, Benifallet, Tivenys, Xerta, Aldover, Tortosa, and Amposta in the province of Tarragona (Catalonia).

== Geography ==
=== Upper part and tributaries ===
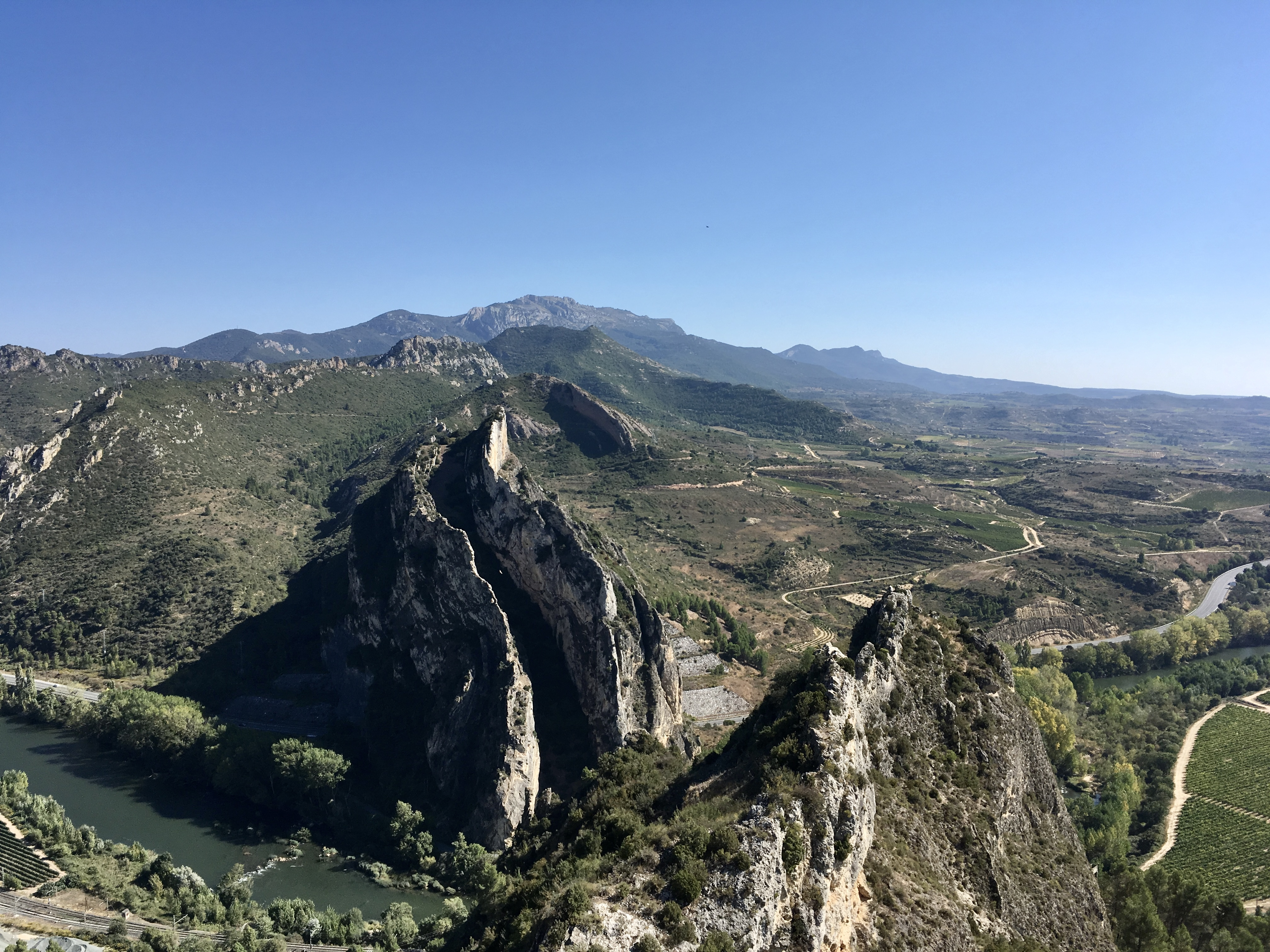
The conchas of Haro, where the Ebro passes into La Rioja forming the border with the Basque country

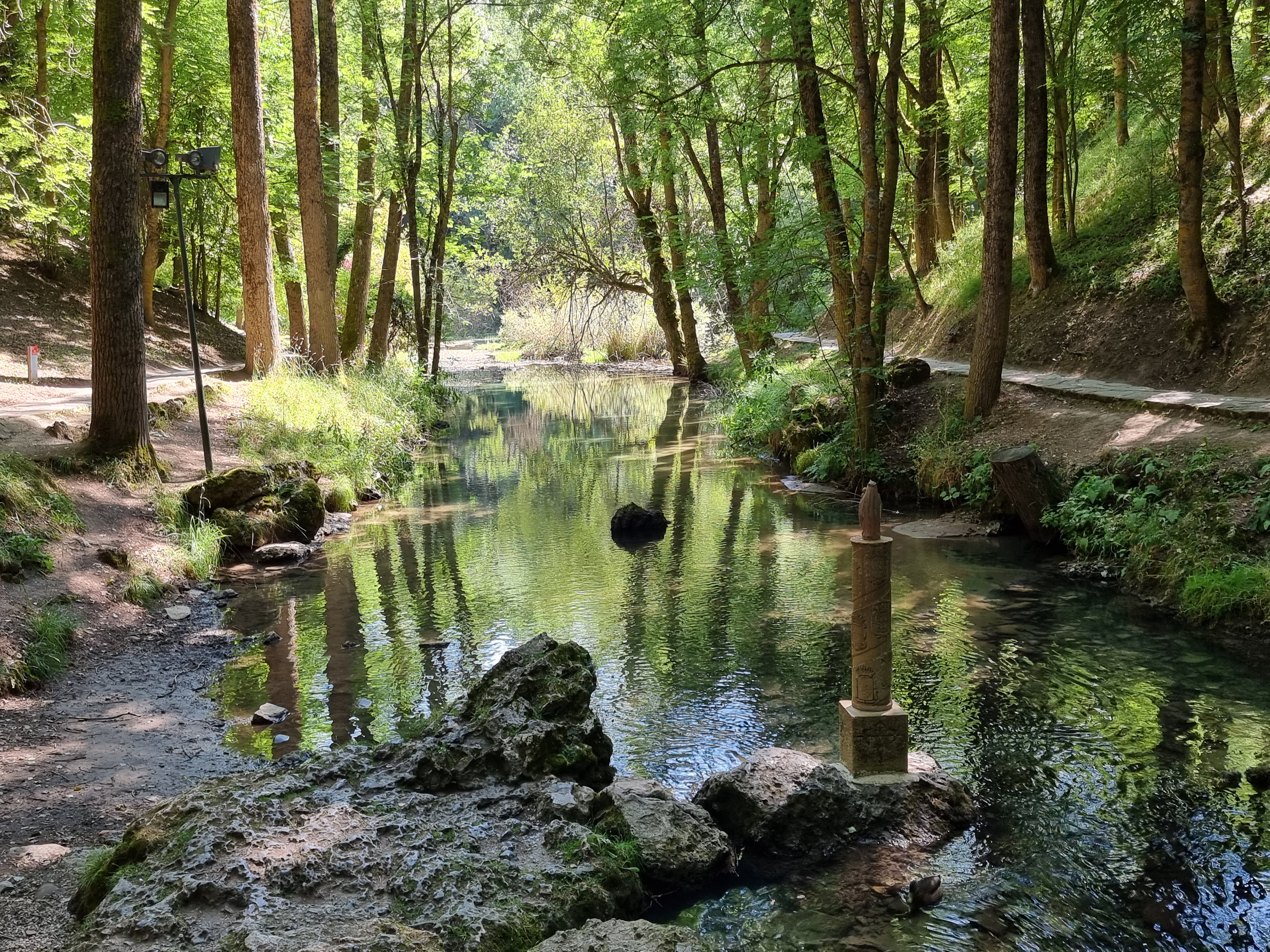
The source of the Ebro in Fontibre.

The source of the river Ebro is in the Cantabrian Mountains, in Fontibre, Cantabria (Fontibre is from Latin Fontes Iberis, i.e. 'source of the Ebro'), just 42 kilometres (26 mi) from the Bay of Biscay, in the Atlantic Ocean. Close by is a large artificial lake, Embalse del Ebro, created by its damming.

The upper Ebro rushes through rocky gorges in the province of Burgos. Flowing roughly eastwards it passes las conchas de Haro and begins forming a wider river valley among limestone rocks when it reaches La Rioja and Navarre. Southern tributaries rise on the nearby watershed, the Sistema Ibérico, a mountain range among those of Spain's centre. North of the headwaters is the Cantabrian mountain range (south of Bilbao and Santander). Much of the total water volume of the Ebro comes from its northern tributaries, which drain about 2/3 of the southern slopes of the Pyrenees mountains, which run along the border with France.

All of Andorra's drainage basin is in the Ebro, through the Segre.

=== Climate ===
Downstream from Cantabria the climate in the Ebro basin – the valley being isolated from sea air masses by surrounding mountains – becomes Mediterranean/Atlantic influenced and continental. This implies summer/winter seasonal contrast and a rather dry climate. Summers of the Ebro Valley most often mirror those of a semiarid climate; some of them see more breaks of storms or showers, yet others are more arid, bringing drought save where advanced irrigation is used.

The valley flood plains experience annual rainfall between 300 and 600 mm (12–24 in), with maxima in fall and spring. It is often covered with chaparral vegetation. Summers are hot and winters are cold. The dry summer season has temperatures of more than 35 °C (95 °F), occasionally reaching over 40 °C (104 °F). In winter, the temperatures often drop below 0 °C (32 °F). In some areas the vegetation depends heavily on moisture produced by condensation fog. It is a continental Mediterranean climate with extreme temperatures. There are many ground frosts on clear nights, and sporadic snowfalls.

=== Soil and geology ===
The natural topsoils across the plains are, outside of historically well-forested zones, thin. The subsoil being close to the surface is organically poor and quick-draining: calcareous, pebbly, stony layers. These are in places salt-rich, seeing some saltwater endorheic lagoons.

Karst geological processes shaped the landscape of layers of soluble carbonate rock of extensive limestone bedrock formed in an ancient seabed.

=== Flow volume ===
The valley expands and the Ebro's flow then becomes slower as its water volume increases, flowing across Aragon. There, larger tributaries flowing from the central Pyrenees and the Iberian System discharge large amounts of water, especially in spring during the thawing season of the mountain snow.

=== Ecosystems ===
The biomes are diverse in these Mediterranean climate zones: Mediterranean forests, woodlands, and scrub. Hinterlands are particularly distinctive on account of extensive sclerophyll shrublands known as maquis, or garrigues. The dominant species are Quercus coccifera (in drier areas) and Quercus ilex. These trees form monospecific communities or communities integrated with Pinus, Mediterranean buckthorns, Myrtus, Chamaerops humilis, junipers, Pistacia, Rosmarinus, Thymus, and so on.

The hinterland climate becomes progressively more continental and drier, and therefore there is an end from extreme temperatures accompanied by slow-growing dwarf juniper species to unvegetated desert steppes as in "llanos de Belchite" or "Calanda desert".

The mountain vegetation is mostly coniferous forests that are drought-adapted, and hardier trees in the oak genus (Quercus), typically less tolerant, in the wetter highlands.

Halophiles (extremophiles as to salt) abound in zones of endorheic lagoons and their feeder creeks. Tamarix-covered, these include endemic species of bryophytes, chenopodiaceae, plumbaginaceae, ruppiaceaes, Carex, lythraceae, asteraceae, and others. Their presence is related to the marine origin of the valley and the extensive marine deposits.

Just as it enters Catalonia, the valley narrows, and the river becomes constrained by mountain ranges, making wide bends. 3 massive dams have been built in this area: Mequinenza dam (Province of Zaragoza, 1955), Riba-roja dam (1955), and Flix dam (1948), the latter two in the province of Tarragona. In the final section of its course the river bends southwards and flows through spectacular gorges. The calcareous cliffs and high, rocky hills of the Serra de Cardó almost abut the river separating the Mediterranean coastal strip. After passing the gorges, the Ebro bends again eastwards near Tortosa before discharging in a delta on the Mediterranean Sea close to Amposta in the province of Tarragona.

=== The delta ===
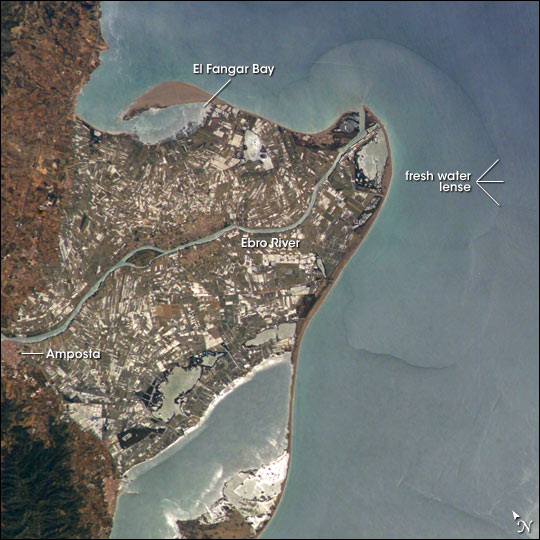
The Ebro Delta from space

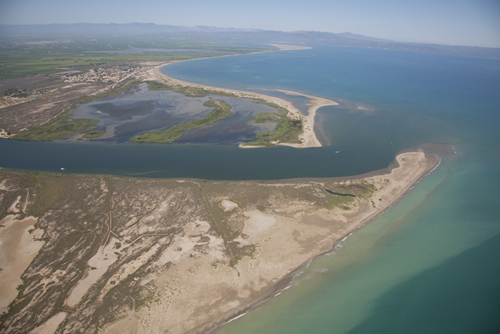
Aerial photograph of the Ebro as it reaches the Mediterranean Sea by the Ebro Delta

The Ebro Delta (Catalan: Delta de l'Ebre), in the Terres de l'Ebre ('Ebro Lands') region, Catalonia, is at 340 km^{2} (130 mi^{2}), or 20km² less, one of the largest wetlands of the western Mediterranean. Designated a Ramsar site, it has entirely grown on soils washed downriver—the historical rate of growth of the delta is demonstrated by the town of Amposta. Recorded and thus confirmed as a seaport in the Roman Warm Period in the 4th century, it is now well inland from the mouths. The rounded form of the delta attests to the subsequent balance between sediment deposition by the Ebro and removal of this material by wave erosion.

The modern delta is in intensive agricultural use for rice, fruit (in particular citrus), and vegetables. The Ebro delta also has numerous beaches, marshes, and salt pans that provide habitat for over 300 species of birds.

The Ebro delta was classified as a wetland area of international interest by Spain's Bureau Mar in 1962. Since a phased-introduction law (1983 to 1986) Spain has designated 7,736 hectares (29.87 mi^{2}) as the Ebro Delta Natural Park (Catalan: Parc Natural del Delta de l'Ebre) to protect its natural resources. A network of canals and irrigation ditches dug by agricultural and conservation groups help to maintain the ecologic and economic resources of the delta.

== Name ==
The Greeks called the river Ἴβηρ (Ibēr), abir, ah'ir and the Romans called it the Hibēr, Ibēr, or Ibērus flūmen, leading to its current name. The Iberian Peninsula and the Hibērī or Ibērī (the people of the area) were named after the river. It is not known with any certainty whether the Greeks used a local native name for the river, nor is it known what the words hibēr or ibēr might have meant. In modern Basque the word ibar means 'valley' or 'watered meadow', while ibai means 'river', but it is unknown whether these words are related to the etymology of the Ebro River. There are rivers in the Balkans called Ibar (Montenegro and Serbia) and Evros (Bulgaria and Greece). The Greek name might have referred to the Jewish colonies along the river and around the area, as the Hebrew word for a Hebrew-speaking Jew or Hebrew-speaking colony is Ivrí or Ivērí.

== History ==
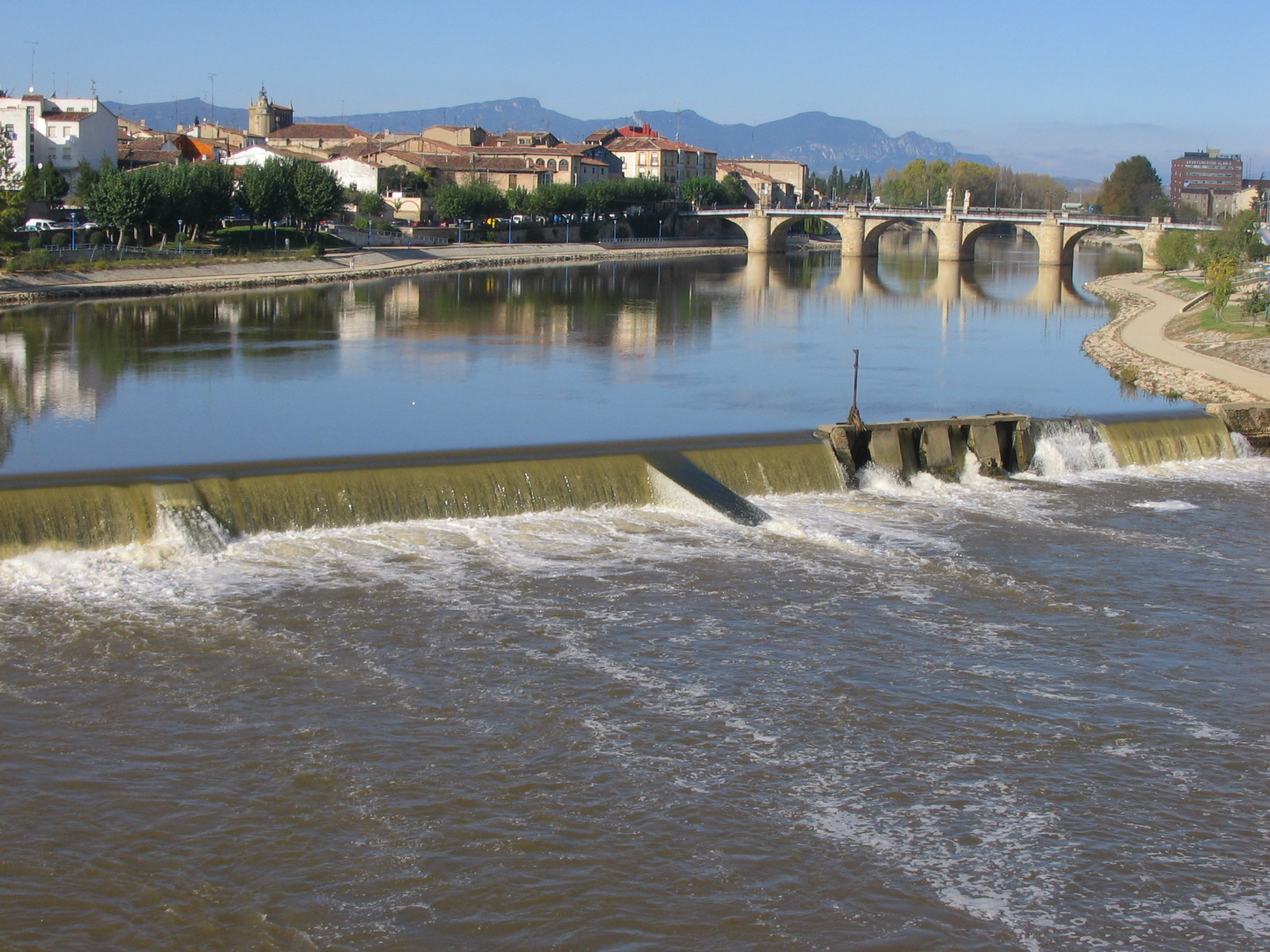
The Ebro in Miranda de Ebro.

In antiquity, the Ebro was used as the dividing line between Roman (north) and Carthaginian (south) expansions after the First Punic War (264–241 BC). When the Roman Republic, fearful of Hannibal's growing influence in the Iberian Peninsula, made the city of Saguntum (considerably south of the Ebro) a protectorate of Rome, Hannibal viewed the treaty violation as an aggressive action by Rome and used the event as the catalyst to the Second Punic War.

One of the earliest Cistercian monasteries in Spain, Real Monasterio de Nuestra Señora de Rueda (lit. 'Royal' Monastery of Our Lady of the Wheel), is located on the banks of the Ebro in Aragon. Established in 1202, the edifice survives intact. The monastery is strongly connected to the Ebro, since it used one of the first large waterwheels built for the production of power in Spain. The monastery also diverted flow from the Ebro to create a circulating, hydrological central heating system for its buildings.

The Ebro in 1938 was the starting ground of one of the most famous Republican offensives of the Spanish Civil War. Known as the Battle of the Ebro, the offensive ended in defeat for the Republican forces, although they enjoyed success in its first stages. They were not able to reach their objective of Gandesa.

== Flow and floods ==
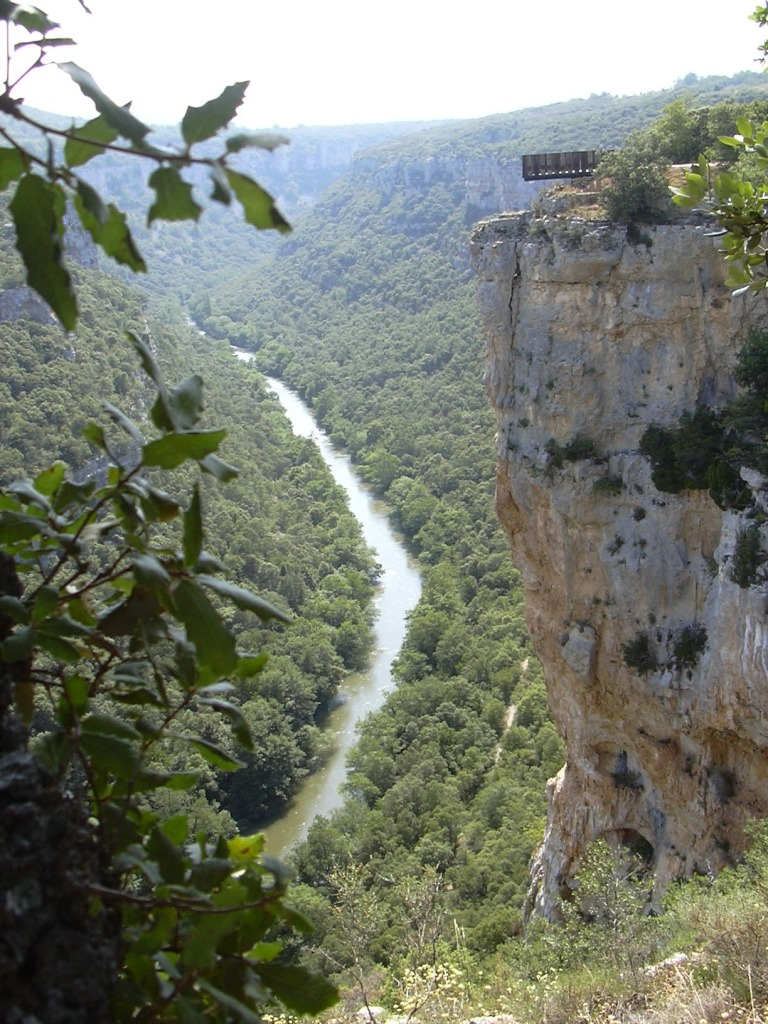
The Ebro gorge in es: Pesquera de Ebro.

The Ebro is the most important river in Spain in terms of length, 928 km (577 mi), and area of drainage basin, 85,550 km^{2} (33,030 mi^{2}). However, the mean annual flow decreased by approximately 29 percent during the 20th century due to many causes: the construction of dams, the increasing demands for irrigation and the evaporation (higher than the rainfall, due to low rainfall, high sunshine and strong and dry winds) from reservoirs in the river basins. This situation has a direct impact on the deltaic system at the mouth of the river because its hydrological dynamics are mainly controlled by the river discharge.

The decrease in river discharge has meant introduction of the salt wedge further into the river. The mean annual river flow is approximately the critical flow which determines the formation and the break-up of the salt wedge. Thus, when the river discharge is between 300 and 400 m^{3}/s (11,000 and 14,000 cu ft/s), the salt wedge can occupy the last 5 km (3 mi) of the estuary, but when the discharge is between 100 and 300 m^{3}/s (3,500 and 10,600 cu ft/s), the salt wedge can advance up to 18 km (11 mi) from the mouth. For less than 100 m^{3}/s (3,500 cu ft/s), the salt wedge quickly advances to its maximum extent, reaching 32 km (20 mi) from the mouth. In addition to decreased mean annual flow, the increased river regulation in the Ebro basin has produced daily and seasonal changes in the flow pattern.

With regards to the sediment load, several authors conclude that the sediment load was reduced by more than 99 percent during the last century. The drastic reduction in sediment transport implies a sediment deficit in the delta, which is causing the erosion of the coastline and lack of sediment replenishment. The unstable surface is due to weather changes and tidal surges. The river floods from time to time, although advance warning can now be given as a result of monitoring within the catchment area. The river flow in Zaragoza during floods, from the end of the 19th century is as follows:

- March 1888: 3,760 m^{3}/s (132,800 cu ft/s)
- January 1891: 3,250 m^{3}/s (114,800 cu ft/s)
- February 1892: 3,790 m^{3}/s (133,800 cu ft/s)
- January 1895: 3,118 m^{3}/s (110,100 cu ft/s)
- March 1930: 3,600 m^{3}/s (127,100 cu ft/s)
- December 1930: 3,000 m^{3}/s (105,900 cu ft/s)
- October 1937: 3,000 m^{3}/s (105,900 cu ft/s)
- January 1941: 4,000 m^{3}/s (141,300 cu ft/s)
- February 1952: 3,260 m^{3}/s (115,100 cu ft/s)
- January 1961: 4,130 m^{3}/s (145,800 cu ft/s)
- November 1966: 3,154 m^{3}/s (111,400 cu ft/s)
- January 1981: 2,940 m^{3}/s (103,800 cu ft/s)
- February 2003: 2,988 m^{3}/s (105,500 cu ft/s)
- March 2003: 2,220 m^{3}/s (78,400 cu ft/s)
- April 2007: 2,282 m^{3}/s (80,600 cu ft/s)

The Ebro poured 1,874 million cubic metres (1,519,000 acre-feet) into the delta from 27 March 2007 to 11 April 2007, with an average of 117 million cubic metres (95,000 acre-feet) per day.

== Ecology ==
Academics and local government have criticised ecological impacts of:

- dams
- pollution from populations
- factories
- agricultural dumping
- invasive species affecting the original ecosystem; the introduced species have rapidly caused the extinction of numerous indigenous species

In past times numerous lagoons, endorheic saltwater ponds, and freshwater swamps and marshes were drained, dried or filled. Almost entire riparian forests were cleared for crops or for pulpwood forest plantations. Due to these changes numerous plant and animal species have disappeared. Due to dams and hydraulic canalization, the dynamics of the river have been altered and new scroll-bars, new oxbow lakes, and new abandoned meanders will not now be created. Over a period of time, many of these phenomena tend to dry out or fill in with sediments. Some small representatives of these river dynamics and wetlands are protected.

The Ebro Delta Natural Park, covering 7,802 hectares (19,280 acres), was finalised in 1986 and is of international importance for 8 of its plant species and 69 of its vertebrate fauna. It has some 95 breeding species of birds, is also very important for a wide range of overwintering species, and serves as an essential stopover point for large numbers of migratory birds. The Ebro delta has the world's largest colony of Audouin's gulls. In 2006 it held a record number of more than 15,000 pairs, its highest to date.

The introduction of American crayfish Procambarus clarkii has resulted in economic losses, introduced elsewhere for cultivation, its success is attributable to its ability to colonise disturbed habitats that would deter the edible iberian crayfish. The semiaquatic rodent Myocastor coypus is beginning to expand in some northwest tributaries of the head damaging crops and protected national parks in the Basque Country. Fish caught in all lower reaches of the Ebro are high in mercury and the European Union prohibits their sale, notably the huge Wels catfish.

The zebra mussel, an invasive species, is expanding upstream in the Ebro's waters. Due to its rapid rate of reproduction, the species adversely affects the port's underwater machinery as well as that of dams and hydroelectric plants, in addition to competing with native species. Following the introduction of Wels catfish, many fish species' numbers are in clear and rapid decline. Since the Wels catfish's introduction in the Mequinenza reservoir in 1974, it has spread to other parts of the Ebro and its tributaries, especially the Segre. Some endemics species of iberian barbels, genus Barbus in the Cyprinidae, have declined drastically, having once been abundant, especially in the Ebro. Competition and predation by Wels catfish caused its complete disappearance in the middle channel Ebro around 1990. Barbel species from mountain stream tributaries of the Ebro that Wels catfish have not colonized were not affected. The ecology of the river also now has the problem of a major increase in aquatic vegetation, seaweed and algae.

== See also ==
- Hydrological transport model
- List of rivers of Spain
