= Aldover =

- Municipality
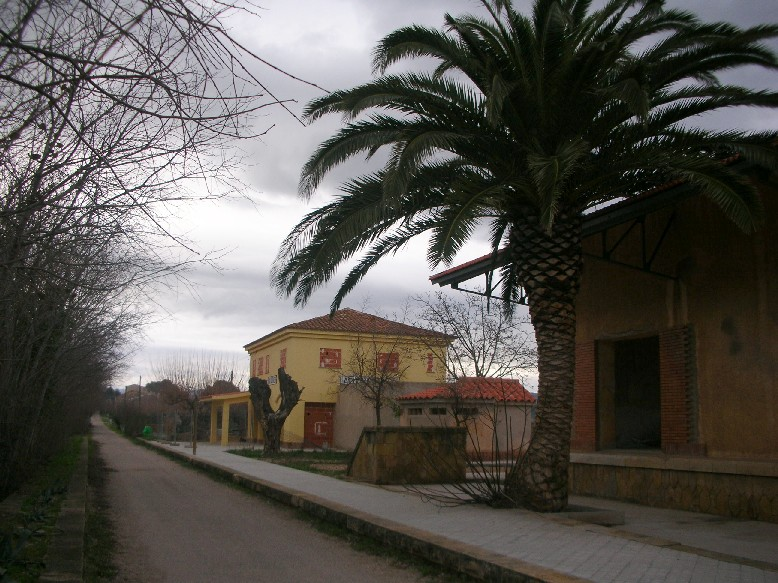
- Abandoned train station in Aldover

- Coat of arms

- Location in Catalonia
- Coordinates: 40°52′54″N 0°30′04″E
- Country: Spain
- Community: Catalonia
- Province: Tarragona
- Comarca: Baix Ebre

Government
  - mayor: Rosalia Pegueroles Gisbert (2019)

Area
  - Total: 20.2 km^{2} (7.8 sq mi)
- Elevation: 14 m (46 ft)

Population (2025-01-01)
  - Total: 901
  - Density: 44.6/km^{2} (116/sq mi)
- Postal code: 43006
- Website: www.aldover.altanet.org

Aldover (Catalan pronunciation: [aldoˈβe]) is a municipality in the comarca of Baix Ebre, in the province of Tarragona, in Catalonia, Spain. It has a population of 901 (register office, 2025).

There was a Renfe railway line from Tortosa to Alcañiz and Zaragoza that used to pass through this town until 1973. This line was dismantled as a result of a 1962 World Bank report advising the Spanish State to concentrate investment in the great lines and to abandon the less profitable railways connecting rural areas. Since the line was terminated, the rails were pulled off and the Aldover train station buildings lie abandoned.
