= 2020 Kerala human chain =

Protest in Kerala, India

Manushya Maha Sringhala
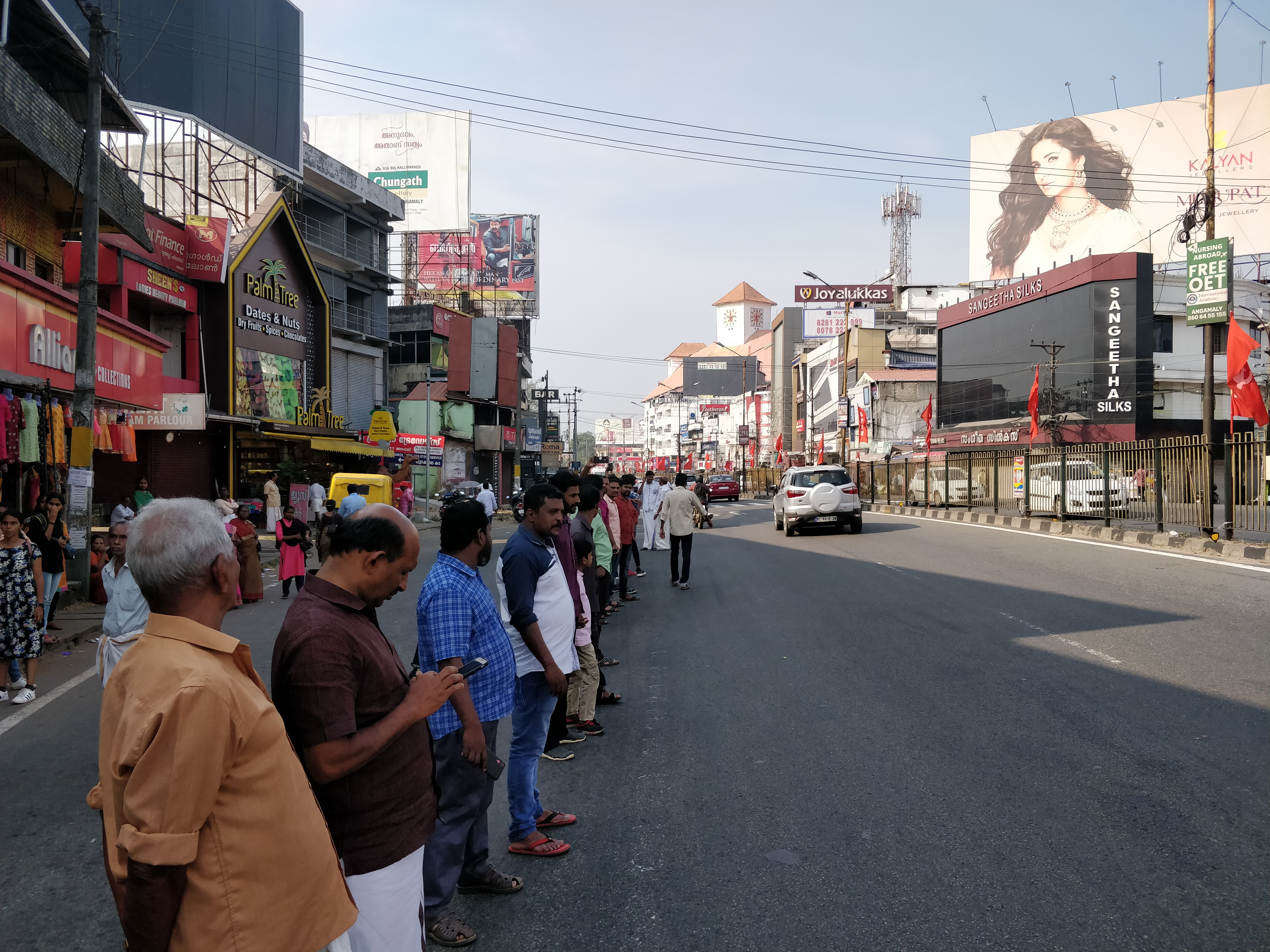
- People at Manushya Maha Sringhala from Angamaly, Kerala, India
- Date: 26 January 2020
- Location: Kerala, India
- Type: Human chain
- Motive: To take an oath to protect the Constitution of India; To protest against Citizenship Amendment Act and the National Register of Citizens
- Organised by: Left Democratic Front
- Participants: 6-7 million people from Kerala

Manushya Maha Sringhala (Mega Human Network) was a human chain formed on 26 January 2020 across the Indian state of Kerala to protest against the Citizenship Amendment Act and the proposed National Register of Citizens. The chain was formed by approximately 6 to 7 million people and extended for a distance of 700 kilometres (435 miles) stretching north to south from Kasaragod to Kaliyikkavila.

The Left Democratic Front led by the Communist Party of India had organized the human chain. The chain was completed at 16:00 Indian Standard Time (+5:30 GMT) when the participants read out the preamble of the Constitution of India and swore an oath to protect it. The chain was formed on the Republic Day of India.

== Background ==
The Citizenship (Amendment) Act, 2019 (CAA) was passed by the Parliament of India on 11 December. India does not have a law to define refugee status and all undocumented individuals in India are considered illegal migrants. The act grants Indian citizenship to Hindus, Sikhs, Buddhists, Jains, Parsis and Christians who claim to be from Pakistan, Bangladesh or Afghanistan and reduces the period of naturalization. The Ministry of Home Affairs has also introduced the proposal for implementing a National Register of Citizens (NRC) for all citizens of India. The NRC was first implemented in Assam, which excluded 1.9 million individuals who were declared illegal immigrants and sent to detention camps. The individuals in question were predominantly Hindu or Muslim. The NRC was criticized for being deeply flawed and acting on the basis of guilt until proven innocent thereby providing the possibility of genuine citizens being rendered stateless by the process.

The passage of the CAA led to widespread protests across India, leading to at least 25 dead with the ruling Hindu nationalist Bharatiya Janata Party being accused of religious discrimination in providing citizenship, violent suppression of dissent and attempting to disenfranchise and segregate millions of Muslims with the continued insistence on implementing a nationwide NRC. The Act has received criticism from across the world with the UN calling it "fundamentally discriminatory" and a resolution was moved in the EU Parliament against it. Four Indian states passed a resolution against it. Several Indian states also declared that they will not implement either the CAA or the NRC or both of them.

In Kerala, the ruling Left Democratic Front coalition and the opposition United Democratic Front coalition granted joint support to the protests across India. The Legislative Assembly of Kerala passed a resolution against the act. Following the resolution, the government of Kerala filed a lawsuit against the government of India for violating the provisions of fundamental rights and secularism granted by the Constitution of India. The government also stopped work related to the National Population Register which has been reported to be utilized for the conduction of the NRC. The state of Kerala has experienced widespread protests against CAA and NRC while Pinarayi Vijayan, the Chief Minister of Kerala has stated that the state will remain at the forefront to defend the Constitution of India.

== Protest ==
On 24 January 2020, the Left Democratic Front (LDF) announced that it would organize a human chain from Kasaragod to Thiruvananthapuram passing through 10 out of 14 districts with adjoining chains from Pathanamthitta and Kottayam districts on Republic Day. The chain was proposed to follow roads on the right side. Police officers were employed to prevent traffic disruption on the roads. The LDF convener, A. Vijayaraghavan stated that they welcomed participation from everyone regardless of political affiliation excluding communal and extremist forces. The opposition United Democratic Front however provided no clear indication of support while the LDF was able to disseminate the message that the chain was not to be linked to any electoral interests other than the protection of the constitution and the secular fabric of the country.

On 26 January 2020, the 71st Republic Day of India, the Left Democratic Front organized one of the largest event of protest with a continuous human chain pledging to defend the Constitution of India which stretched from the northernmost end of the administrative border of Kerala to the southernmost end. The chain when formed directly passed through 12 districts of Kerala, those being Kasaragod, Kannur, Kozhikode, Malappuram, Palakkad, Thrissur, Ernakulam, Kottayam, Alappuzha, Pathanamthitta, Kollam and Thiruvananthapuram districts, respectively in sequence. The chain extended till the border of Tamil Nadu at Kaliyakkavilai. The districts of Wayanad and idukki were not a part of the main chain but separate parallel chains were formed in them.

The human chain was organised with the help of transportation provided by the Left Democratic Front to connect the less populated parts along national highways. At 15:30 Indian Standard Time (3:30 PM), leaflets of the pledge were distributed and a rehearsal was held with directions issued through microphones. At 16:00 Indian Standard Time (4:00 PM), the chain was formally formed when the participants read out the preamble to the Constitution of India and then took the pledge. The chain was dispersed at 16:15 Indian Standard Time (4:15 PM) and public meetings were held at 250 locations in the state. The Left Democratic Front claimed that 7.5 million people had participated in the chain. A worker from the Rashtriya Swayamsevak Sangh attempted to commit suicide during the demonstration, who was later found out to be psychologically unstable.

Various prominent personalities participated in the human chain. S. Ramachandran Pillai, General-Secretary of the All India Kisan Sabha was the first link in the chain and M. A. Baby, former Minister of Education (Kerala) was the last link. Chief Minister, Pinarayi Vijayan and Communist Party of India state secretary, Kanam Rajendran joined the chain in the capital of Kerala, Thiruvananthapuram at Martyr's square, Palayam. The whistleblower and ex-nun Lucy Kalappurakkal joined the chain in Wayanad district. Mohammed Yousuf Tarigami, a former member of legislative assembly of Jammu and Kashmir joined the chain at Malappuram.

== Reactions ==
=== Indian Union Muslim League ===
The Indian Union Muslim League which is part of the opposition United Democratic Front (UDF) coalition while had given joint support with the ruling coalition to the protests suspended one of its local leaders for participating in the human chain, following friction in the UDF resulting from alignment with their political rivals.

=== United Democratic Front (Kerala) ===
In response to the human chain, the opposition UDF coalition too formed human maps of India, in 12 out of 14 districts (excluding Wayanad and Kozhikode) in Kerala.

== Gallery ==
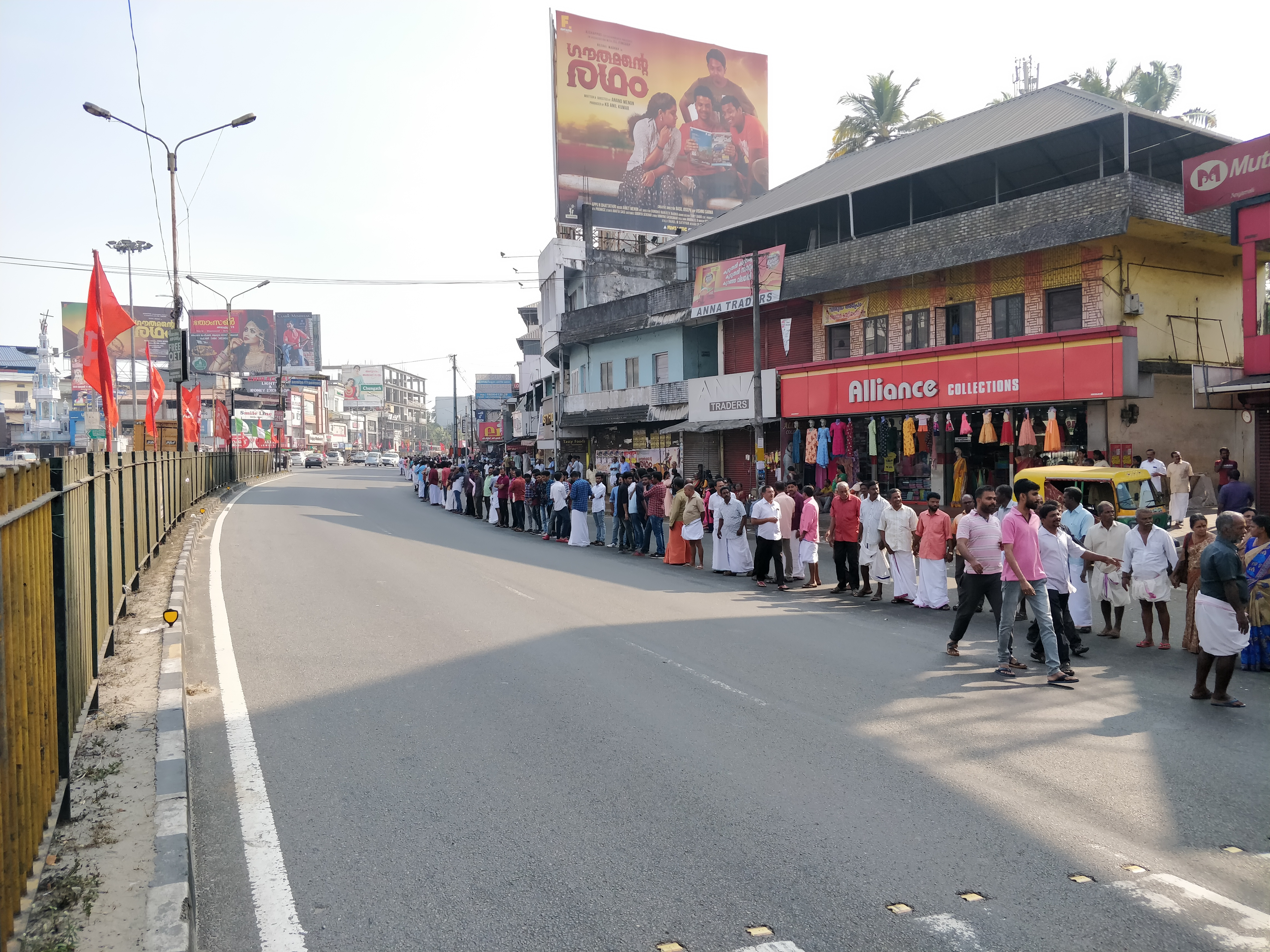
Part of Manushya Maha Sringhala

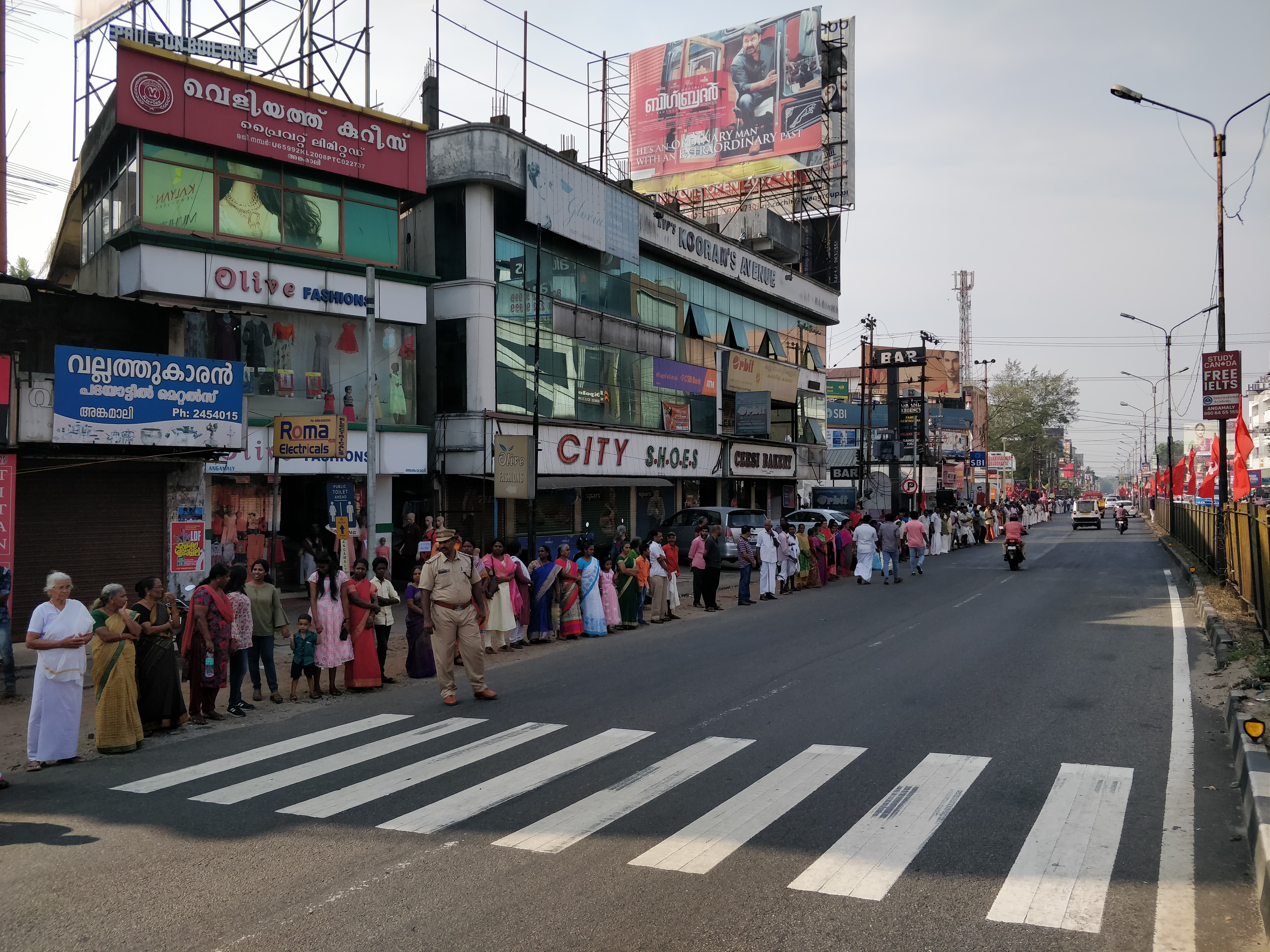
People in the Human Chain

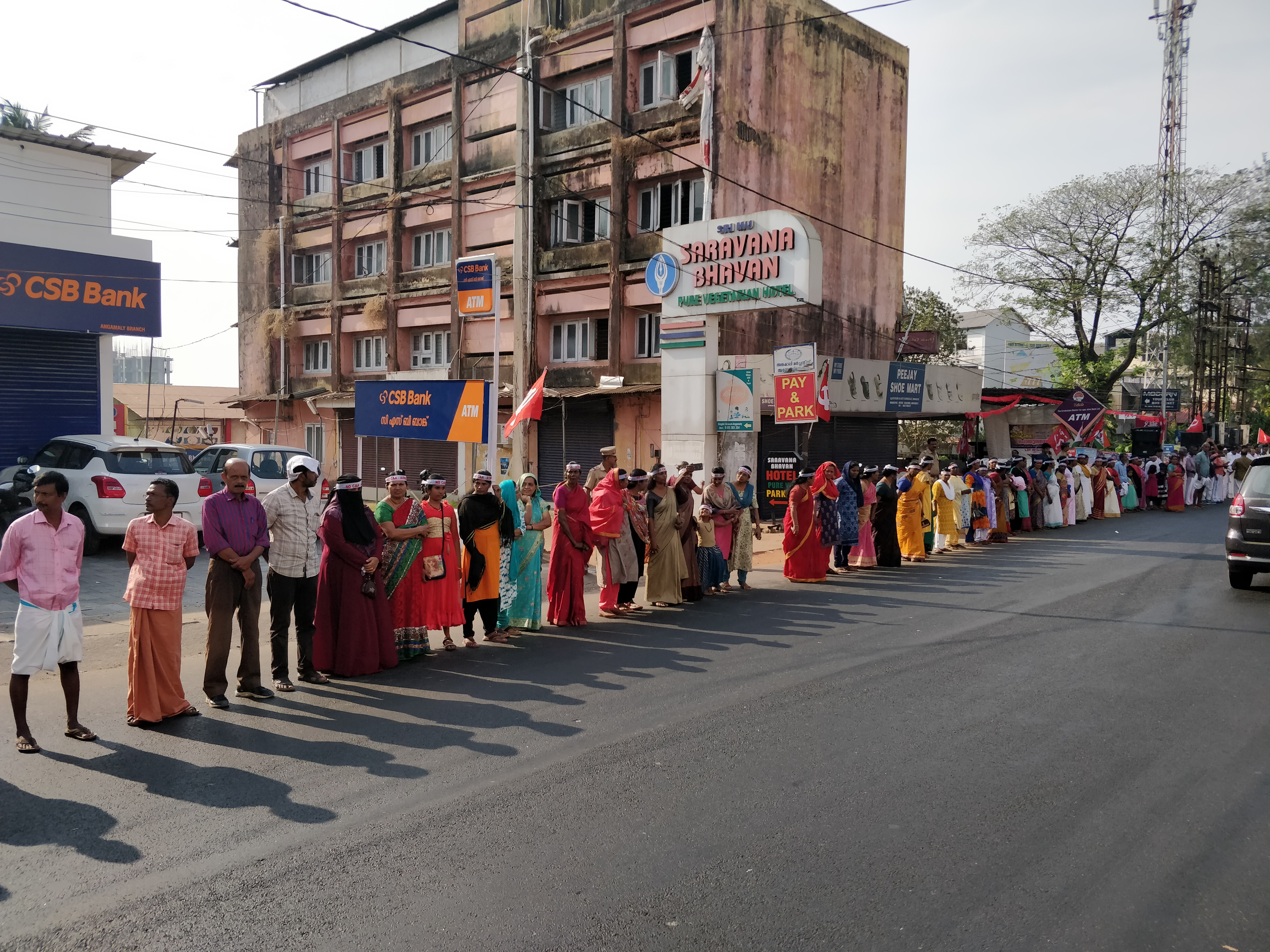
People standing on the road

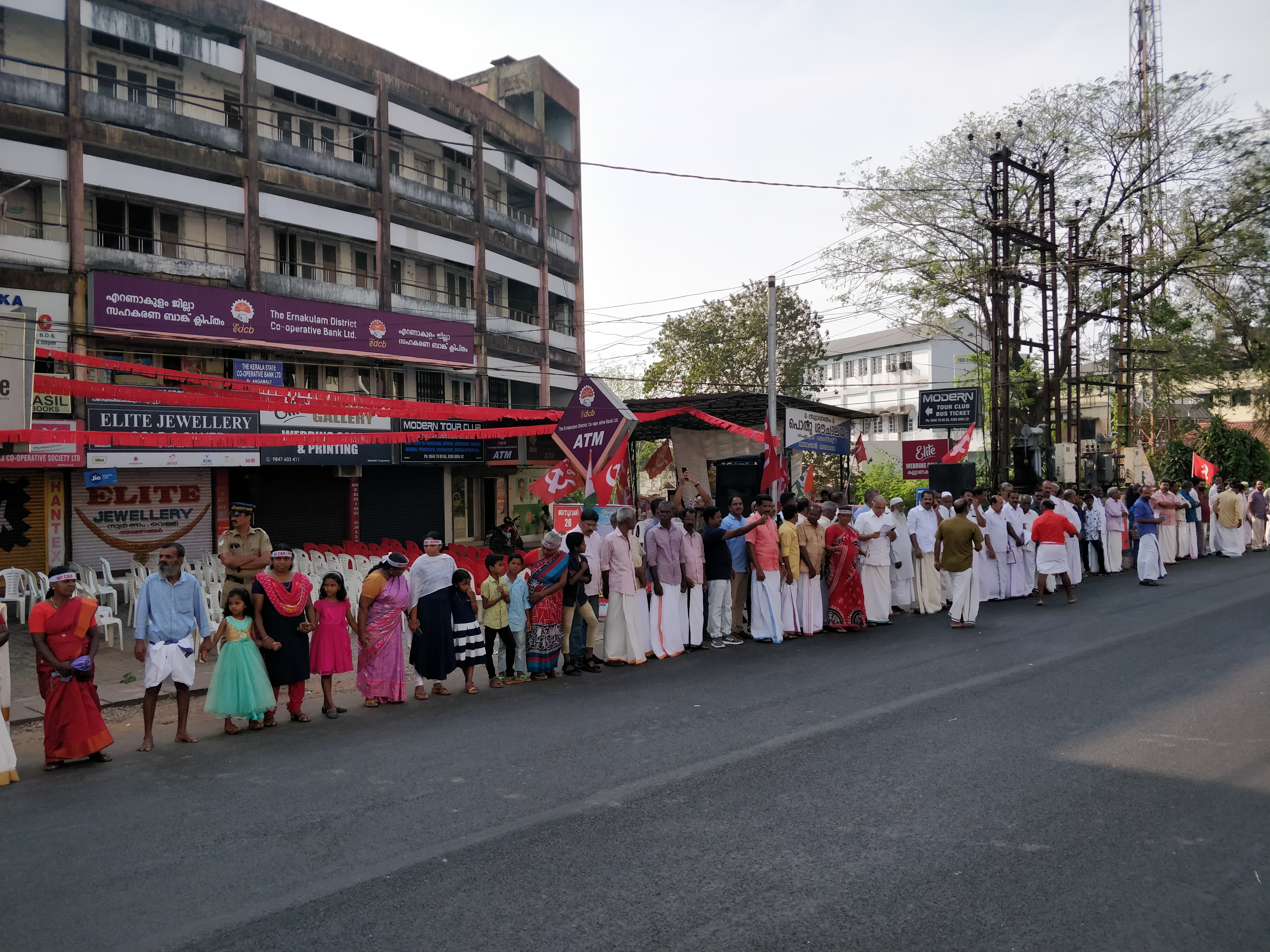

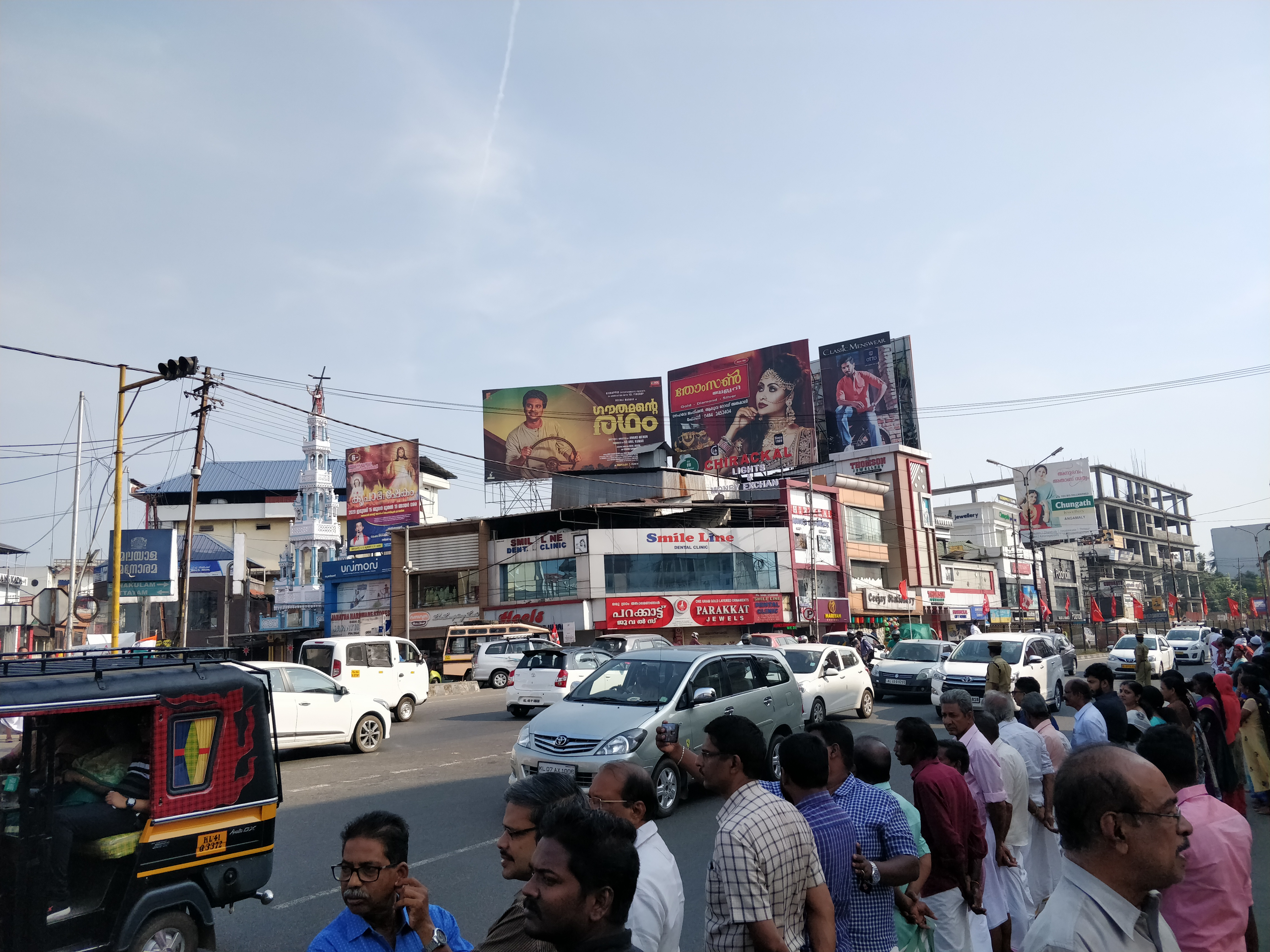
People at the city center

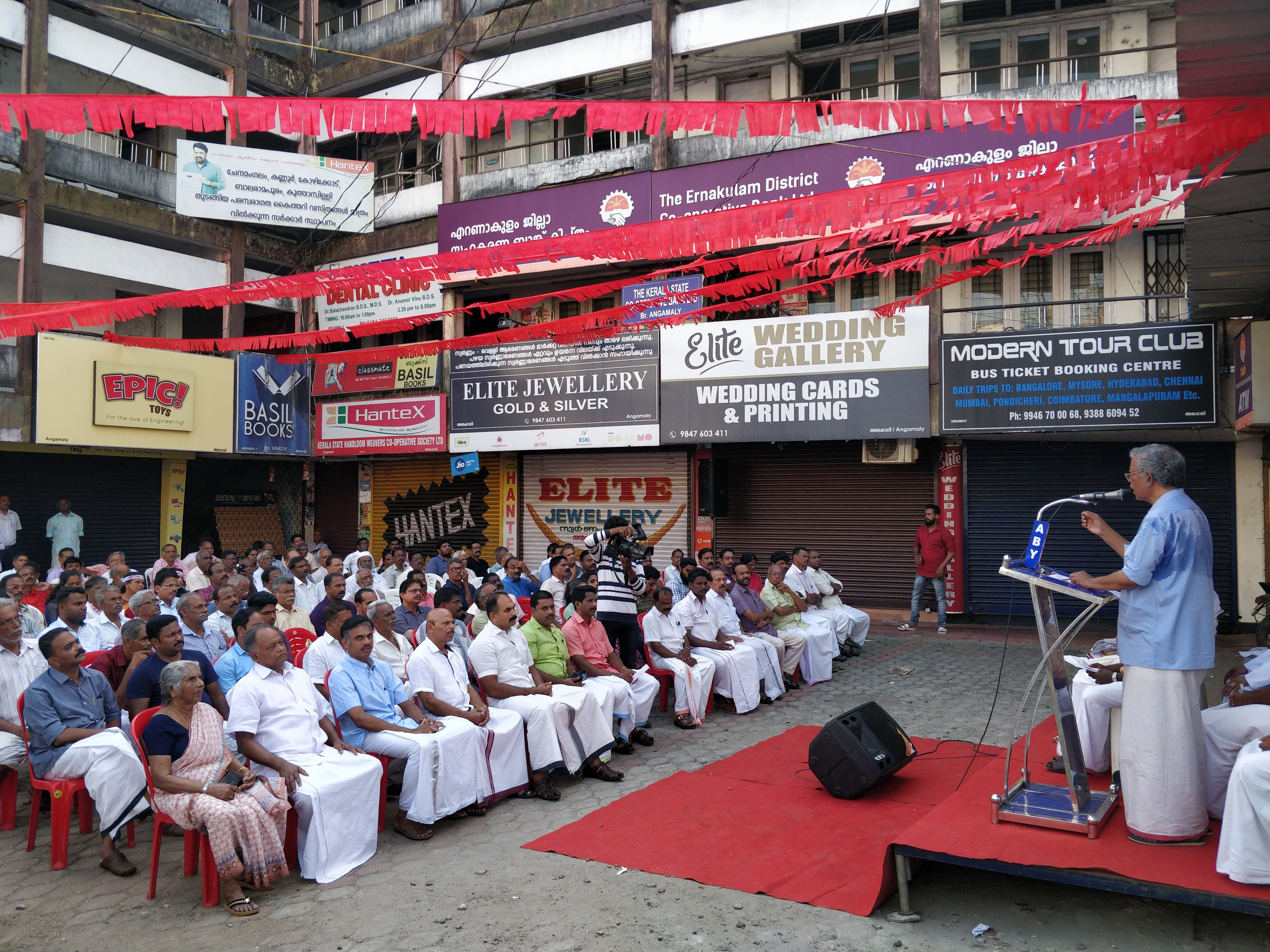
Meeting about the Human Chain

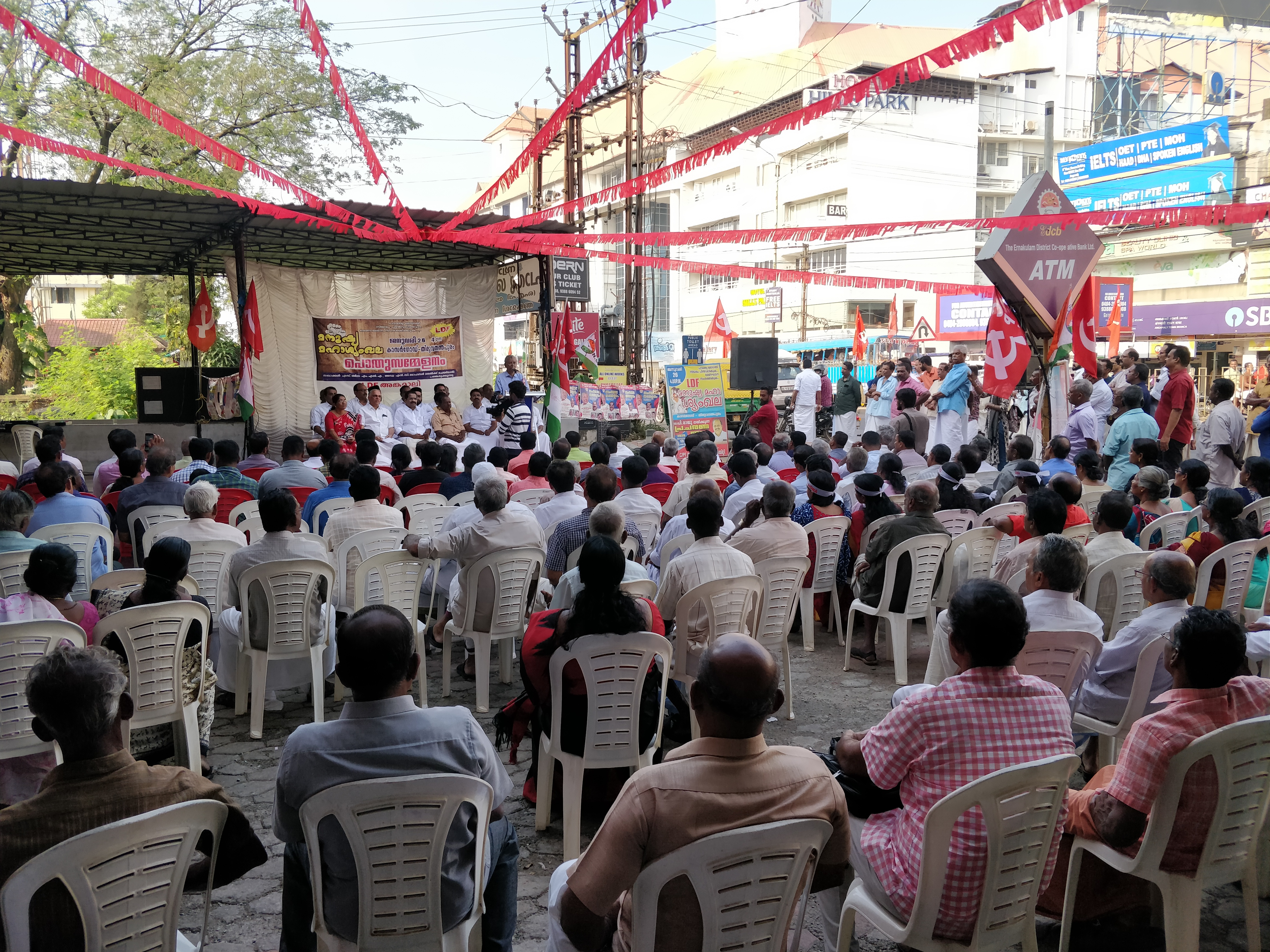
People at the Meeting

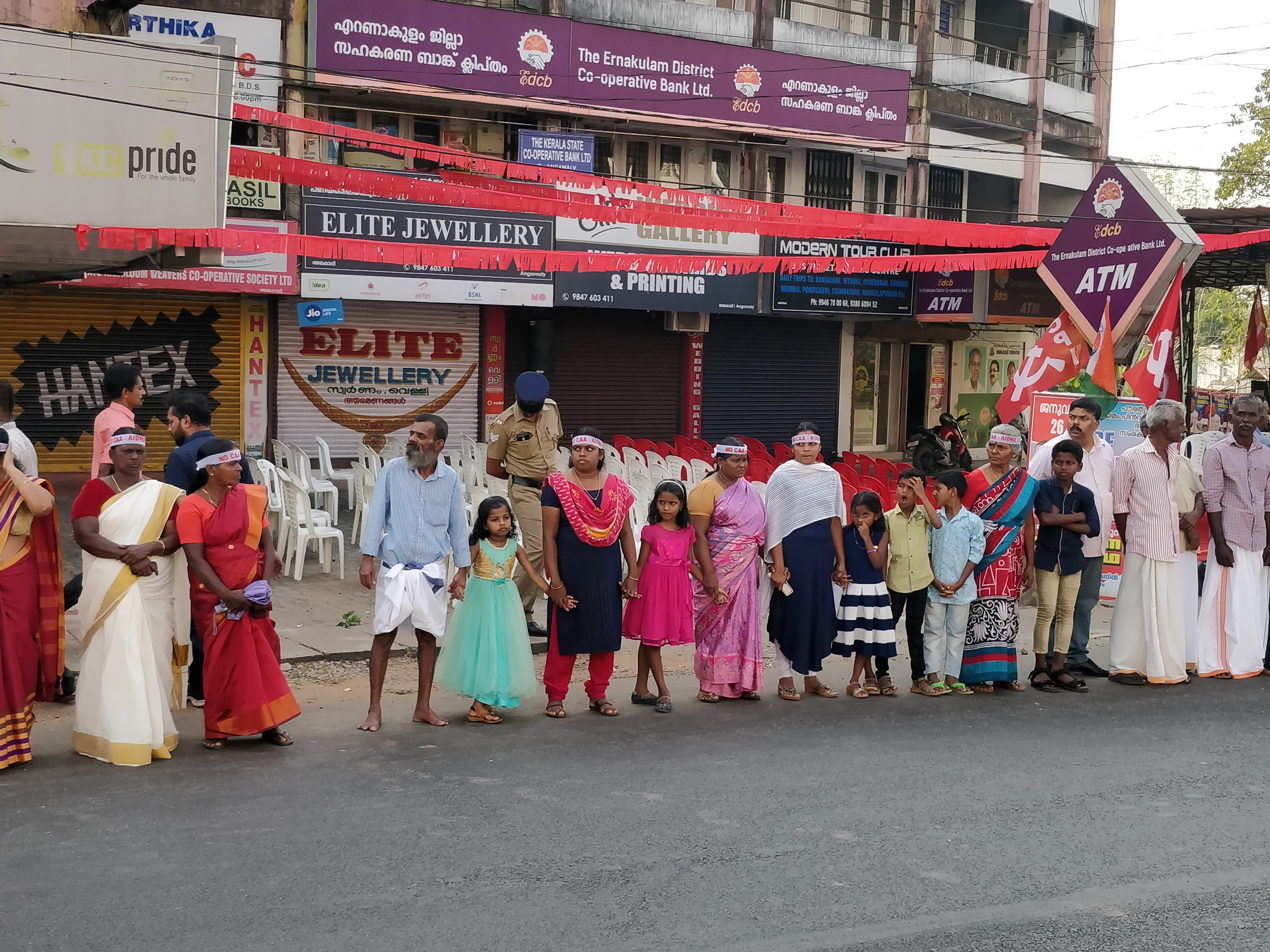
Families in the Chain

== See also ==
- Citizenship Amendment Act protests
- Vanitha Mathil
- Hong Kong Way
- Human chain (politics)
