= Human chain (politics) =

Demonstration in which people link their arms as a show of solidarity

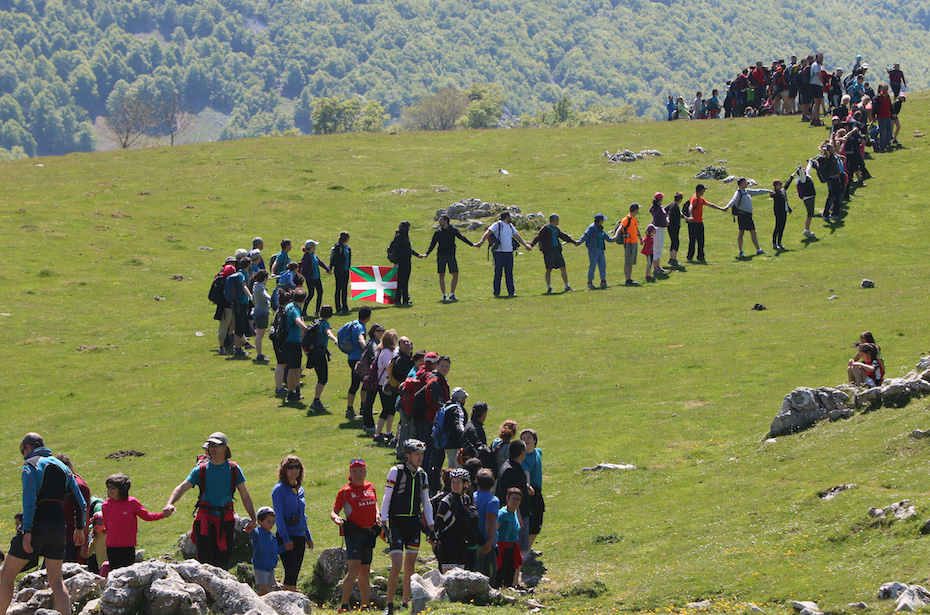
Human Chain for Basque Self-determination, 2014

A human chain is a form of demonstration in which people link arms or hands as a show of political solidarity.

The chains can involve thousands of people, with the world record being claimed in 2020 by Bihar, India, which was estimated to include 51.7 million people across 18,000 kilometres (11,000 mi), to support the government's efforts towards environment conservation and eradication of social evils.

== List of notable human chains ==
Date	Event	Location	Number of participants	Purpose
December 1982	Embrace the Base	RAF Greenham Common Newbury, Berkshire, England	30,000 (women)	Protested siting of nuclear missiles in RAF Greenham Common, an English military base.
1 April 1983	14-mile (23 km) human chain	Greenham to Aldermaston and the ordnance factory at Burghfield	70,000 (40,000 – 80,000)	Protested siting of American nuclear missiles in West Germany.
May 25, 1986	Hands Across America	United States	5,000,000	Charitable event to raise money to fight hunger and homelessness.
August 23, 1989	Baltic Way	Estonia; Latvia; Lithuania	2,000,000	Called for the end of the Soviet occupation of the Baltic countries, and for the restoration of the independence of Estonia, Latvia, and Lithuania.
January 21, 1990	Reunion Day	Lviv–Kyiv, Ukrainian SSR (now Ukraine)	450,000 (according to Soviet militsiya); 3,000,000 (according to organizers)	Marking the 71st anniversary of the Act Zluky, an agreement unifying the Ukrainian People's Republic and the West Ukrainian National Republic.
August 1997	XII World Youth Day, 1997	Paris, France	400,000	A 36 km ring surrounding Paris facing outwards, symbolically calling for peace.
16 May 1998	Jubilee 2000 Human Chain	Birmingham, UK	70,000 – 100,000	The first Chain demonstration by Jubilee 2000, a coalition of church and faith groups, overseas development agencies and others at the G8 Summit in Birmingham, UK, to highlight the indebted poverty of many poor countries and the need for the G8, World Bank and IMF to act to remit that debt. The Chain surrounded Birmingham city center including the International Convention Center.
September 8, 1999	Protest against violence in East Timor	Lisbon	300,000+	A 20 km ring connecting the United Nations delegation and the embassies of Russia, China, UK, France and the US in Lisbon, calling for the end of violence in East Timor.
February 28, 2004	228 Hand-in-Hand Rally	Taiwan	1,000,000+ ( 2,000,000+ according to organizers)	Commemoration of the February 28 Incident and protest of People's Republic of China missiles aimed at Taiwan.
July 25, 2004	Israeli Chain	Gush Katif (Jewish communities adjacent to the Gaza Strip, Israel), to the Western Wall, Jerusalem (90 kilometers)	130,000 (according to police)	Opposing Prime Minister Ariel Sharon's Disengagement Plan which involves dismantling of Jewish communities and settlements of Gush Katif.
December 11, 2004	'No Confidence' campaign to the BNP-led alliance government	Teknaf to Tentulia, Bangladesh	5,000,000+ and	The participants were supporters of 14 opposition parties led by the Bangladesh Awami League to express their 'No Confidence' campaign to the BNP-led alliance government and to demand fresh polls. It was 1,050 km (652.4 miles) long.
May 1, 2006	Great American Boycott	New York City. (Manhattan, Queens, Brooklyn Bronx)	12,000 (according to CNN )	Protesting H.R. 4437, a bill in Congress to toughen immigration checks.
February 25, 2008	Gaza Chain	Gaza	20,000	Protesting Israeli blockade of Gaza
September 1, 2008	"Stop Russia" campaign	Georgia	1,000,000 (according to the Georgian authorities)	Protesting Russian military intervention
October 24, 2008	2009 Tamil protests in India	Chennai, India	100,000 – 150,000	Protesting the violence against Tamils in Sri Lanka and the Sri Lankan Civil War.
December 13, 2008	"Mumbai citizens form human chain to protest attacks"	Mumbai, India	60,000	Protesting Against the terror attacks that took place in Mumbai on the 26th of November 2008
January 28, 2009	2009 Tamil protests in Canada	Toronto, Canada	20,000	Protesting the violence against Tamils in Sri Lanka and the Sri Lankan Civil War.
June 9, 2009	Green Chain, Iran's Presidential Election; 2009 Iranian Election Protests	Tehran, Iran	18,000 – 30,000	In support of Mir-Hossein Mousavi
October 2, 2009	Kerala CPM, 2009 ASEAN agreement Protest	Kerala, India	200,000	Protesting against the ASEAN and New Delhi free trade agreement
February 3, 2010	Telangana JAC, Telangana Human Chain	Andhra Pradesh, India		The people of Telangana formed a 500 kilometers-long human chain all along the National Highway number 7 from Adilabad on the northernmost tip of the region to Alampur on the borders of Kurnool district, to press their demand for forming a separate state.
December 10, 2012	Human Chain for Human Rights.	Bhubaneswar, Odisha, India	20,000	25 km long Human chain formed for Human Rights on Human Rights Day on December 10, 2012 by 20,000 tribal students of Kalinga Institute of Social Science (KISS) in Bhubaneswar, Odisha, India .
September 11, 2013	Catalan Way Towards Independence	Throughout Catalonia	1,600,000	480 km long Human chain organized by the Assemblea Nacional Catalana for the independence of Catalonia.
November 29, 2013	Pro-European Union protests / Against Russian intervention	Various, largest from Ukraine to Subcarpathian Voivodeship. Also Lithuania – Latvia.	2,000,000+	Symbolic "linking" of Ukraine to the European Union
June 8, 2014	Human Chain For The Right to Decide of the Basque Country	Throughout Basque Country, from Durango to Iruñea-Pamplona	150,000+	123 km long Human chain organized by Gure Esku Dago for the Self-determination of the Basque Country.
October 1, 2015	Madhesh Human Chain	Mechi to Mahakali, Hulaki Rajmarg, Nepal.	1,500,000+	The 2015 Human Chain for Madhesh Movement was an organised protest in Nepal for pressurizing the government of Nepal to withdraw the discriminatory policies being institutionalized in the constitution that came in effect on 20 September 2015. The Madheshis the residents and indigenous population of Madhesh, the southern plains of Nepal, created world record in creating 1155 km of human chain to draw attention of Nepal government.
December 29, 2016	Kerala LDF, 2016 Indian Bank Note Demonetization Protest	Kerala, India	1,000,000+ (according to estimates made by the organizers)	Protesting against the demonetization of ₹500 (US$7.40) and ₹1,000 (US$15) banknotes
21 January 2017	Support for Total prohibition	Bihar, India	20,000,000	The participants expressed support to implement and promote complete Prohibition of liquor and intoxicants in the territory of the State of Bihar and in favour of the law to be passed by Nitish Kumar Government by forming human chain of around 12,760 km across the state of Bihar. It was of the length of 11,292 km (7,017 mi).
June 10, 2018	Human chain for Basque self-determination 2018	Basque Autonomous Community, Spain	175,000	Advocacy for a right of the Basques to decide their political status.
1 January 2019	Vanitha Mathil (Women's wall)	Kerala, India	3,000,000 –5,000,000 (women)	The women's wall was formed for a distance of around 620 kilometers from Kasargod to Thiruvananthapuram to uphold gender equality and protest against gender discrimination. .
August 23, 2019	Hong Kong Way	Hong Kong	210,000	Advocacy for withdrawal of the extradition bill and for democratic elections. The chain was nearly 50 km (30 mi) and stretched through Hong Kong Island, Kowloon and the New Territories. It was held on the 30th anniversary of the Baltic Way Chain of Freedom, a peaceful gathering that called for independence from Soviet Union.
October 27, 2019	2019–20 Lebanese protests	Lebanon coastline	170,000	Symbolize the unity of the Lebanese protesters against austerity, political corruption and sectarianism. It ran from Tripoli to Tyre.
January 26, 2020	Manushya Maha Sringhala	Kerala state	6,000,000 – 7,500,000	A 700 km long human chain was formed on Republic Day, across the state of Kerala in India. The chain was organized by the ruling Communist Party of India (Marxist) led Left Democratic Front. The chain was formed to swear an oath to protect the Constitution of India and to demand the withdrawal of the Citizenship Amendment Act and non-implementation of the National Register of Citizens.
