= The Baltics Are Waking Up =

1989 song for the occasion of the Baltic Way

The Baltics Are Waking Up! (Lithuanian: Bunda jau Baltija; Latvian: Atmostas Baltija; Estonian: Ärgake, Baltimaad) is a trilingual song composed by Boriss Rezņiks for the occasion of the Baltic Way, a large demonstration against the Soviet Union for independence of the Baltic States in commemoration of the 50th anniversary of the Molotov–Ribbentrop Pact. The song is sometimes regarded as the joint anthem of the Baltics. The Lithuanian text was sung by Žilvinas Bubelis, Latvian by Viktors Zemgals, and Estonian by Tarmo Pihlap.

== See also ==
- Baltic Way
- Singing Revolution
