= Baltic Way =

1989 peaceful demonstration in the form of a human chain

The Baltic Way
- Part of the Singing Revolution, the Revolutions of 1989, and the Dissolution of the Soviet Union
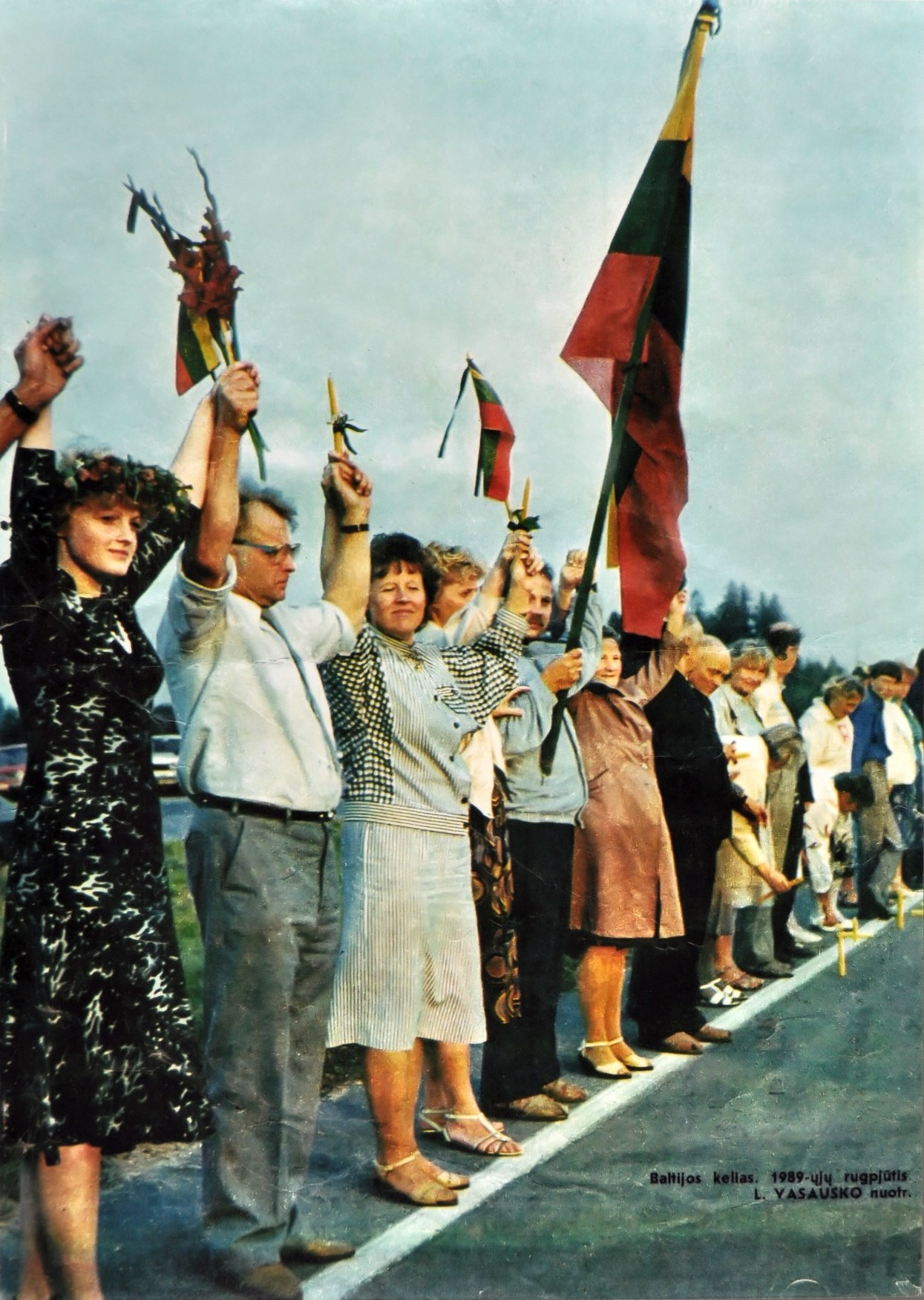
- The Baltic Way: The human chain connecting the three Baltic capitals – Tallinn, Riga and Vilnius.
- Date: 23 August 1989; 37 years ago
- Location: Estonia, Latvia and Lithuania (three countries occupied by the Soviet Union)
- Also known as: Baltic Chain of Freedom
- Cause: 50th anniversary of the Molotov–Ribbentrop Pact
- Organised by: Popular Front of Estonia Popular Front of Latvia Sąjūdis
- Participants: About 2 million people
- Outcome: Independence of the three countries was regained by August 1991

The Baltic Way (Lithuanian: Baltijos kelias; Latvian: Baltijas ceļš; Estonian: Balti kett) or Baltic Chain (also "Chain of Freedom") was a peaceful political demonstration that occurred on 23 August 1989. Approximately two million people joined their hands to form a human chain spanning 675 kilometres (419 mi) across the three Baltic states of Estonia, Latvia, and Lithuania, with a combined population of around eight million citizens, who had been subject to the Soviet Union's repression for more than 45 years before the dissolution of the Soviet Union in 1991. At the time, the three Baltic countries were occupied by the Soviet Union.

The demonstration originated from "Black Ribbon Day" protests held in Western cities in the 1980s. It marked the 50th anniversary of the Molotov–Ribbentrop Pact, in which Poland, Finland, Estonia, Latvia, Lithuania, and Romania were (as "spheres of influence") divided between the Soviet Union and Nazi Germany. The Soviet-Nazi pact led to the outbreak of World War II in September 1939 and the Soviet invasion and occupation of the Baltic countries in June 1940.

Estonian Rahvarinne, Latvian Tautas fronte, and Lithuanian Sąjūdis were the Baltic pro-independence movements that planned, organized, and led the 1989 events with the primary goal of drawing global attention by demonstrating an overwhelming popular desire for independence and showcasing solidarity among the three nations. Contemporary historians generally agree that the Baltic Way represented an effective publicity campaign and an emotionally captivating, as well as visually stunning scene.

The event presented an opportunity for the Baltic activists to publicise the Soviet rule and position the question of Baltic independence not only as a political matter, but also as a moral issue. The Soviet authorities responded to the event with intense rhetoric, but failed to take any constructive actions that could bridge the widening gap between the Baltic republics and the rest of the Soviet Union. Seven months after the protest, Lithuania became the first Soviet republic to declare independence.

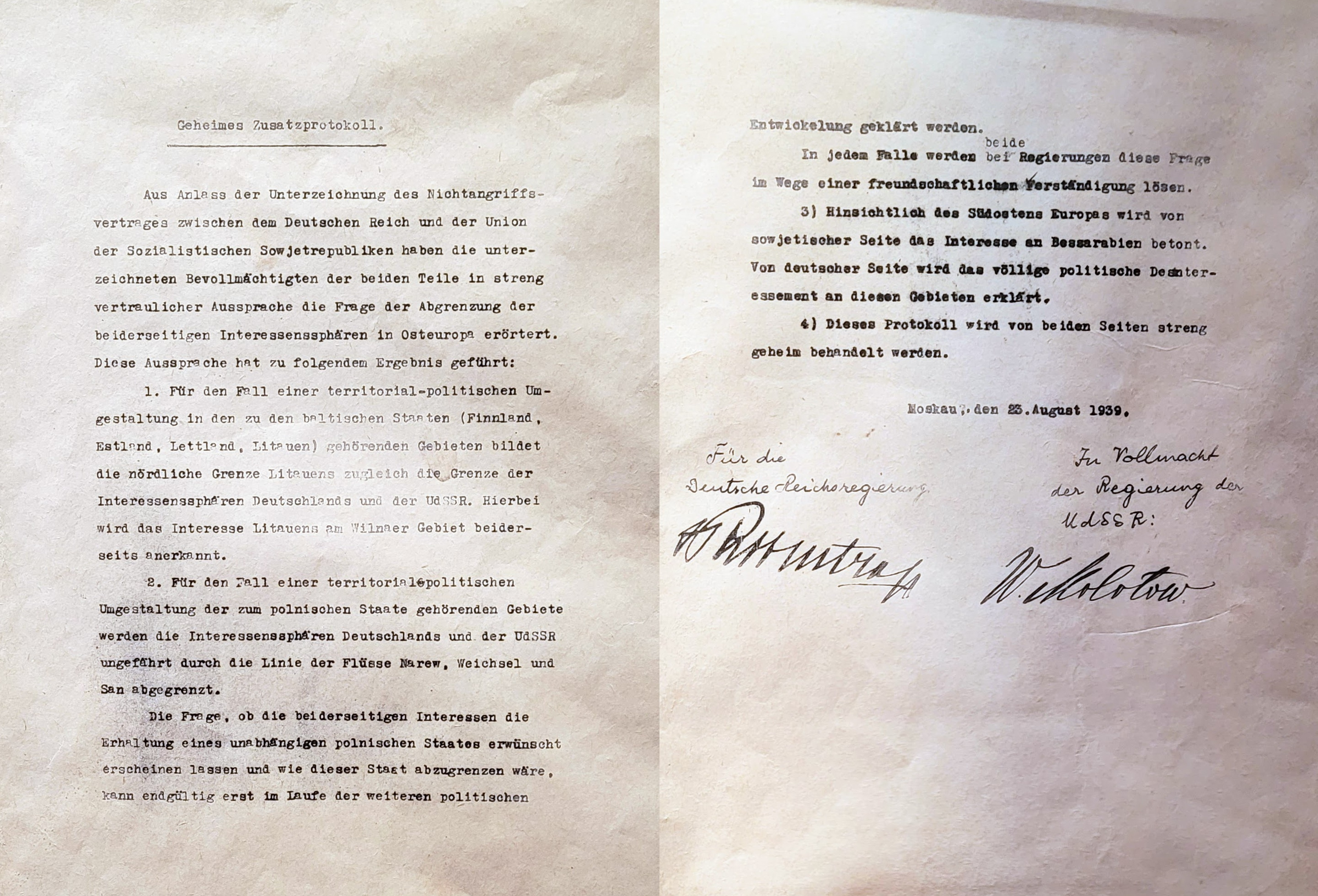
The 23 August 1939 Molotov–Ribbentrop Pact divided "the Baltic States (Finland, Estonia, Latvia, Lithuania)" into German and Soviet "spheres of influence" (German copy)

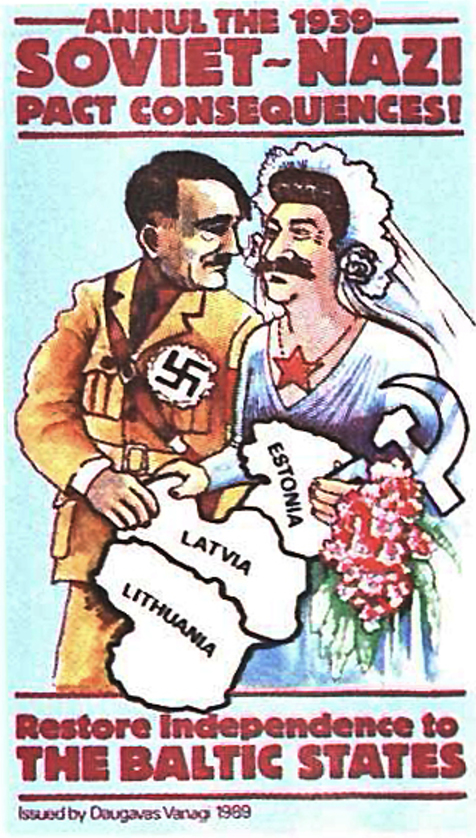
Poster denouncing the Molotov–Ribbentrop Pact

After the Revolutions of 1989, 23 August has become an official remembrance day both in the Baltic countries and in the European Union, as well as other countries, known as the Black Ribbon Day or as the European Day of Remembrance for Victims of Stalinism and Nazism.

== Background ==
=== Baltic stance ===
The Soviet Union denied the existence of the secret protocols to the Molotov–Ribbentrop Pact, which had ceded control over the Baltic states to the USSR, despite the protocols' texts having been used as evidence during the Nuremberg Trials and having been published worldwide by many Western scholars. Additionally, the Soviet propaganda also maintained that there was no occupation and that all three Baltic states had voluntarily joined the Soviet Union – the People's Parliaments had expressed the people's will when they petitioned the Supreme Soviet of the Soviet Union to be admitted into the Union. The Baltic states claimed that they were forcefully and illegally incorporated into the Soviet Union. The existence and public revelation of the secret protocols had a significant effect on popular opinion, as people had concrete proof that the Soviet occupation of Estonia, Latvia, and Lithuania was illegal.

Such an interpretation of the Pact had major implications for the Baltics' public policy. If Baltic diplomats could establish a link between the Pact and the occupation, they could claim that the Soviet rule in the republics had no legal basis and therefore all Soviet laws had been null and void since 1940. Such a position would automatically terminate the debate over reforming Baltic sovereignty or establishing autonomy within the Soviet Union – the states would have never belonged de jure to the union in the first place. This would open the possibility of restoring legal continuity of the independent states that had existed during the interwar period. Claiming that no Soviet laws had legal power in the Baltics would also cancel the need to follow the Constitution of the Soviet Union and other formal secession procedures.

In anticipation of the 50th anniversary of the Molotov–Ribbentrop Pact, tensions were rising between the Baltic countries and Moscow. Lithuanian politician Romualdas Ozolas initiated a collection of 2 million signatures to demand the withdrawal of the Red Army from Lithuania. The Communist Party of Lithuania was deliberating the possibility of splitting off from the Communist Party of the Soviet Union. On 8 August 1989, Estonians attempted to amend election laws to limit the voting rights of new immigrants (mostly Russian workers). This resulted in several mass strikes and protests by Russian workers. Moscow gained an opportunity to present the events as an "inter-ethnic conflict" – it could then position itself as "peacemaker," restoring order in a troubled republic.

The rising tensions in anticipation of the protest spurred hopes that Moscow would react by announcing constructive reforms to address the demands of the Baltic people. At the same time, fears grew of a violent clampdown. East Germany's head of state, Erich Honecker, and Romania's dictator, Nicolae Ceaușescu, offered to provide military assistance to the Soviet Union in the case the Soviets decided to use force and break up the demonstration.

=== Soviet response ===
On 15 August 1989, in response to worker strikes in Estonia, Pravda, the official daily newspaper of the Soviet Union, published sharp criticism of "hysteria" driven by "extremist elements" pursuing selfish "narrow nationalist positions" against the greater benefit of the entire Soviet Union. On 17 August, the Central Committee of the Communist Party of the Soviet Union published a project on a new policy regarding the union republics in Pravda. However, this project offered few new ideas; it preserved Moscow's leadership not only in foreign policy and defense, but also in economy, science, and culture. The project made a few cautious concessions; it proposed the republics have the right to challenge national laws in a court (at the time, all three Baltic states had amended their constitutions, giving their Supreme Soviets the right to veto national laws) and the right to promote their national languages to the level of the official state language (at the same time, the project emphasised the leading role of the Russian language). The project also included laws banning "nationalist and chauvinist organisations", which could be used to persecute pro-independence groups in the Baltics, and a proposal to replace the Treaty on the Creation of the USSR of 1922 with a new unifying agreement, which would be part of the Soviet constitution.

On 18 August, Pravda published an extensive interview with Alexander Nikolaevich Yakovlev, chairman of a 26-member commission set up by the Congress of People's Deputies to investigate the Molotov–Ribbentrop Pact and its secret protocols. During the interview, Yakovlev admitted that the secret protocols were genuine. He condemned the protocols, but maintained that they had no impact on the incorporation of the Baltic states. Thus, Moscow reversed its long-standing position that the secret protocols did not exist or were forgeries, but did not concede that the events of 1940 constituted an occupation. It was clearly not enough to satisfy the Baltics, and, eventually, on 22 August, a commission of the Supreme Soviet of the Lithuanian SSR announced that the occupation in 1940 was a direct result of the Molotov–Ribbentrop Pact and therefore illegal. This marked the first time that an official Soviet body challenged the legitimacy of Soviet rule.

== Protest ==
=== Preparation ===
In light of Mikhail Gorbachev's reforms, especially glasnost and perestroika, street demonstrations had been increasingly growing in popularity and support on the international level. On 23 August 1986, Black Ribbon Day demonstrations were held in 21 Western cities, including New York, Ottawa, London, Stockholm, Seattle, Los Angeles, Perth, and Washington, D.C., to bring worldwide attention to human rights violations by the Soviet Union. In 1987, Black Ribbon Day protests were held in 36 cities worldwide, including Vilnius, Lithuania. Additionally, in 1987, protests against the Molotov-Ribbentrop Pact were held in Tallinn and Riga. In 1988, for the first time, such protests were sanctioned by the Soviet authorities and did not result in police violence or mass arrests of protesters. Furthermore, the activists planned an especially large protest for the 50th anniversary of the Molotov–Ribbentrop Pact in 1989. It is unclear when and by whom the idea of a human chain was advanced. It appears that the idea was proposed during a trilateral meeting in Pärnu on 15 July. On 12 August, an official agreement was reached between Baltic activists in Cēsis. Local Communist Party authorities approved the protest. At the same time, several different petitions denouncing Soviet occupation were gathering hundreds of thousands of signatures.

The organisers mapped out the chain, designating specific locations to specific cities and towns to ensure that the chain would remain uninterrupted. Additionally, free bus rides were provided for those who did not have other transportation. Preparations spread across the country, energising the previously uninvolved rural population. Some employers did not allow workers to take the day off from work (23 August fell on a Wednesday), while others sponsored the bus rides. On the day of the event, special radio broadcasts helped to coordinate the effort. Estonia declared a public holiday.

The Baltic pro-independence movements issued a joint declaration to the world and the European community in the name of the protest. The declaration condemned the Molotov–Ribbentrop Pact, describing it as a criminal act, and urged the passing of a declaration that would render the pact "null and void from the moment of signing." The declaration explicitly stated that the question of the Baltics was a "problem of inalienable human rights," while accusing the European community of "double standards" by effectively turning a blind eye to the "last colonies of Hitler–Stalin era." On the day of the protest, Pravda published an editorial titled "Only the Facts." It was a collection of quotes from pro-independence activists intended to show the unacceptable anti-Soviet nature of their work.

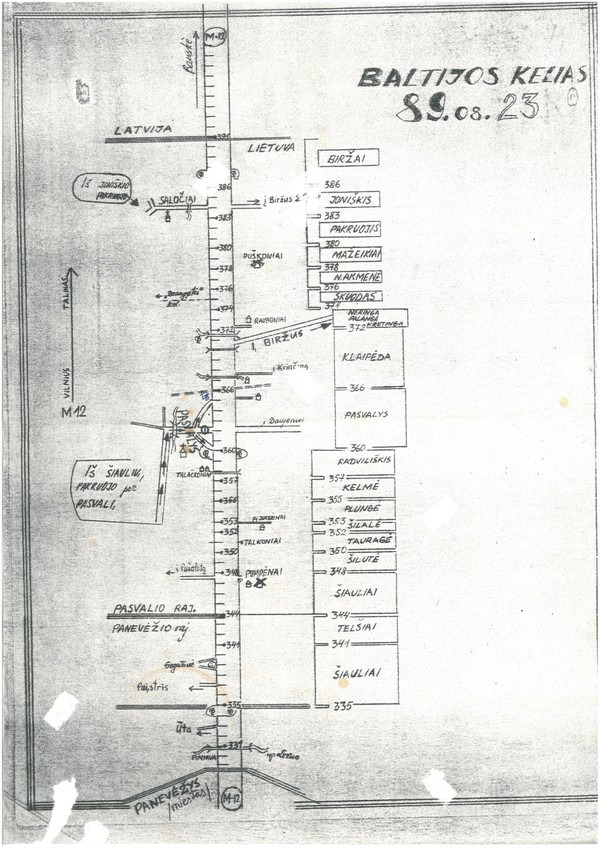
Diagram assigning each city and town a stretch of the road to cover

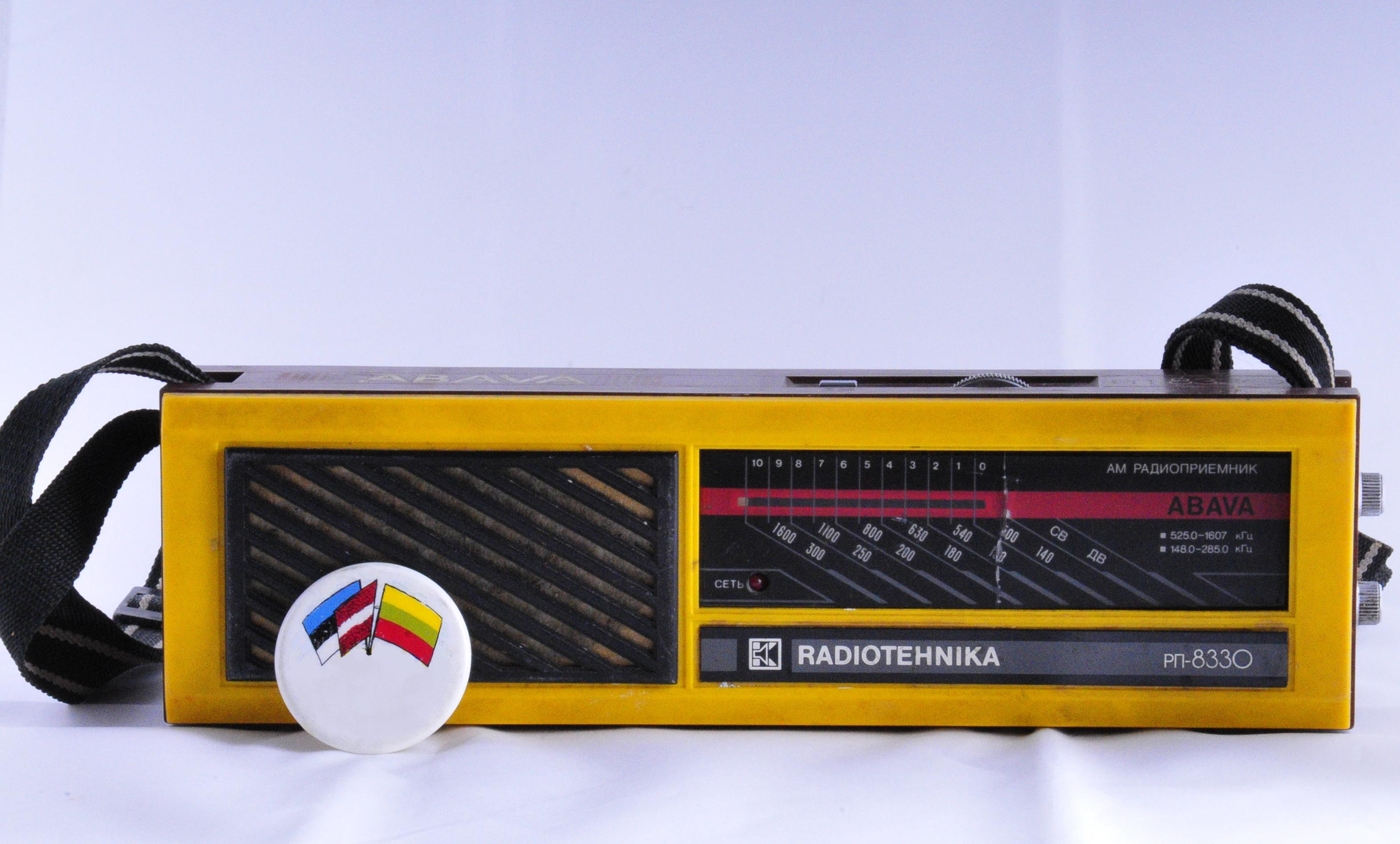
People carried portable radios to coordinate the efforts and badges to show unity among the three states

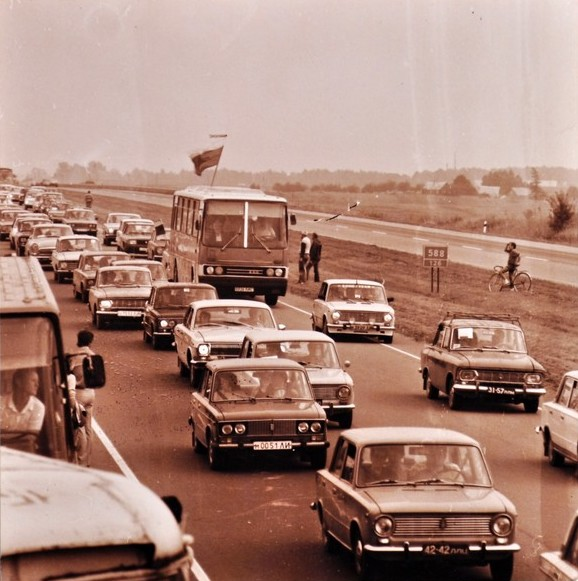
Traffic jam on the A2 highway

=== Human chain ===
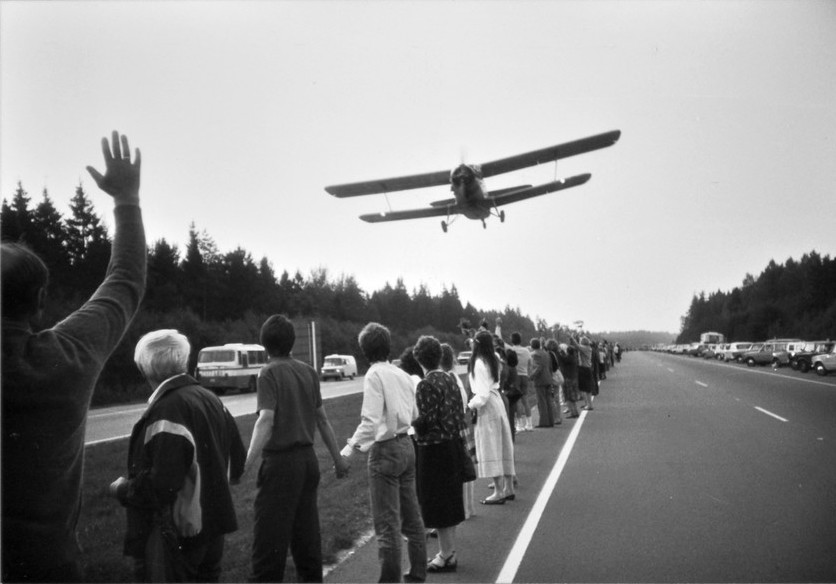
An airplane flying over the human chain

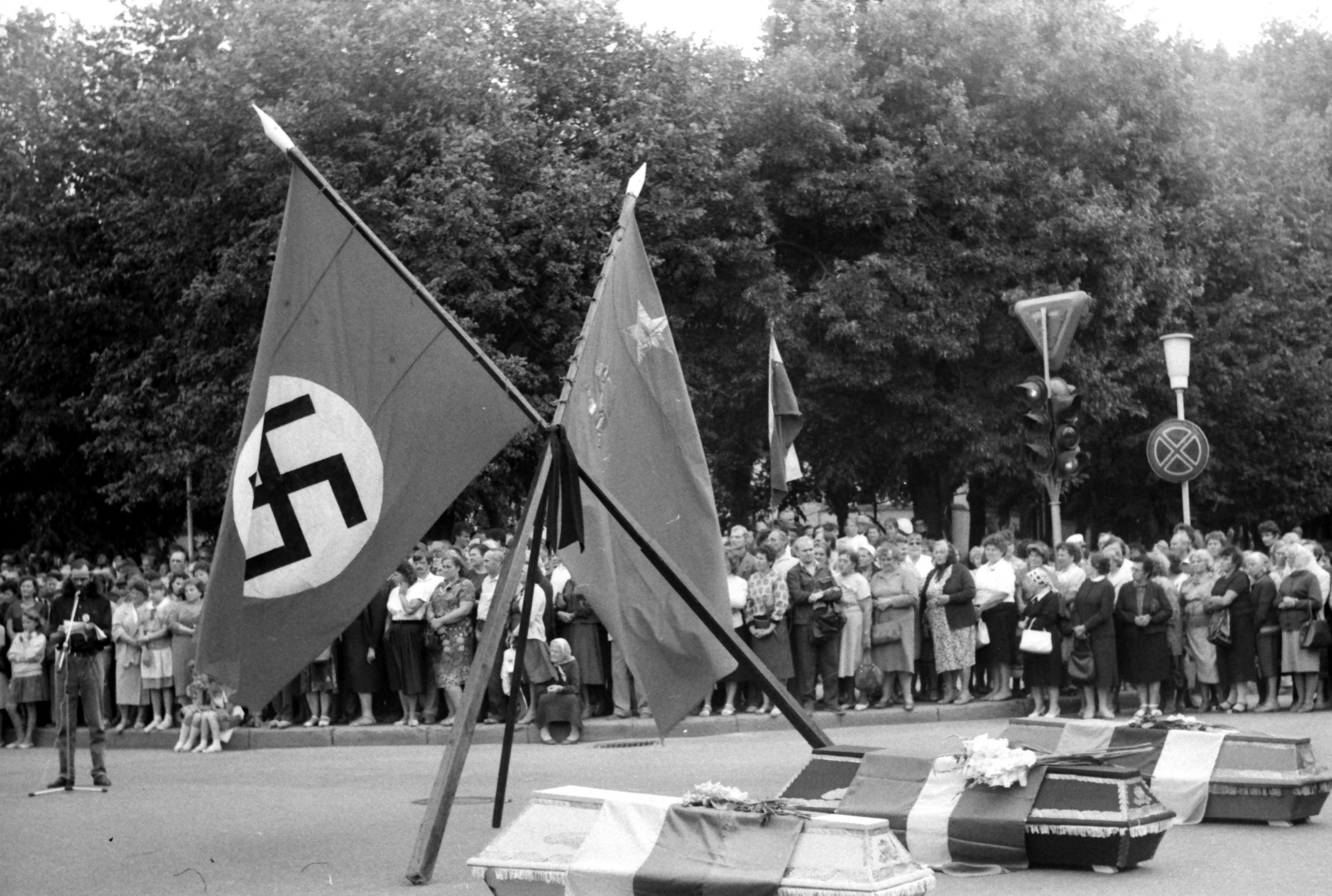
Baltic Way demonstration in Šiauliai, Lithuania. The symbolic coffins decorated with national flags of the three Baltic countries were placed under the flags of Nazi Germany and the Soviet Union.

The chain connected the three Baltic capitals – Vilnius, Riga, and Tallinn. It ran from Vilnius along the A2 highway through Širvintos and Ukmergė to Panevėžys, then along the Via Baltica through Pasvalys to Bauska in Latvia and through Iecava and Ķekava to Riga (Bauska highway, Ziepniekkalna street, Mūkusalas street, Stone bridge, Kaļķu street, Brīvības street) and then along road A2, through Vangaži, Sigulda, Līgatne, Mūrnieki, and Drabeši, to Cēsis, from there, through Lode, to Valmiera and then through Jēči, Lizdēni, Rencēni, Oleri, Rūjiena, and Ķoņi to Estonian town Karksi-Nuia and from there through Viljandi, Türi, and Rapla to Tallinn. The demonstrators peacefully linked hands for 15 minutes at 19:00 local time (16:00 GMT). Later, a number of local gatherings and protests took place. In Vilnius, about 5,000 people gathered in the Cathedral Square, holding candles and singing national songs, including Tautiška giesmė. Elsewhere, priests held masses or rang church bells. Leaders of the Estonian and Latvian Popular Fronts gathered on the border between their two republics for a symbolic funeral ceremony, in which a giant black cross was set alight. The protesters held candles and pre-war national flags decorated with black ribbons in memory of the victims of the Soviet terror: Forest Brothers, deportees to Siberia, political prisoners, and other "enemies of the people".

In Moscow's Pushkin Square, ranks of special riot police were employed when a few hundred people tried to stage a sympathy demonstration. Telegraph Agency of the Soviet Union (TASS) reported that 75 individuals were detained for breaches of the peace, petty vandalism, and other offenses. it was estimated that approximately 13,000 people demonstrated in different cities across the Moldavian Soviet Socialist Republic, which was also affected by the secret protocol. The Baltic émigrés and German sympathizers held a demonstration in front of the Soviet embassy in Bonn, then-West Germany.

Measure	Estonia	Latvia	Lithuania
Total population (1989)	1.6M	2.7M	3.7M
Indigenous population (1959)	75%	62%	79%
Indigenous population (1989)	61%	52%	80%

According to the most reliable Western estimates, the number of participants varied between one and two million people. Reuters News reported the following day that about 700,000 Estonians and 1,000,000 Lithuanians joined the protests. The Latvian Popular Front estimated that approximately 400,000 Latvians participated. Before the event, the organisers expected an attendance of 1,500,000 out of the about 8,000,000 inhabitants of the three states. Such expectations predicted 25–30% turnout among the native population. According to the official Soviet numbers, provided by TASS, there were 300,000 participants in Estonia and nearly 500,000 in Lithuania. To make the chain physically possible, an attendance of approximately 200,000 people was required in each state. Video footage taken from airplanes and helicopters showed an almost continuous line of people across the countryside.

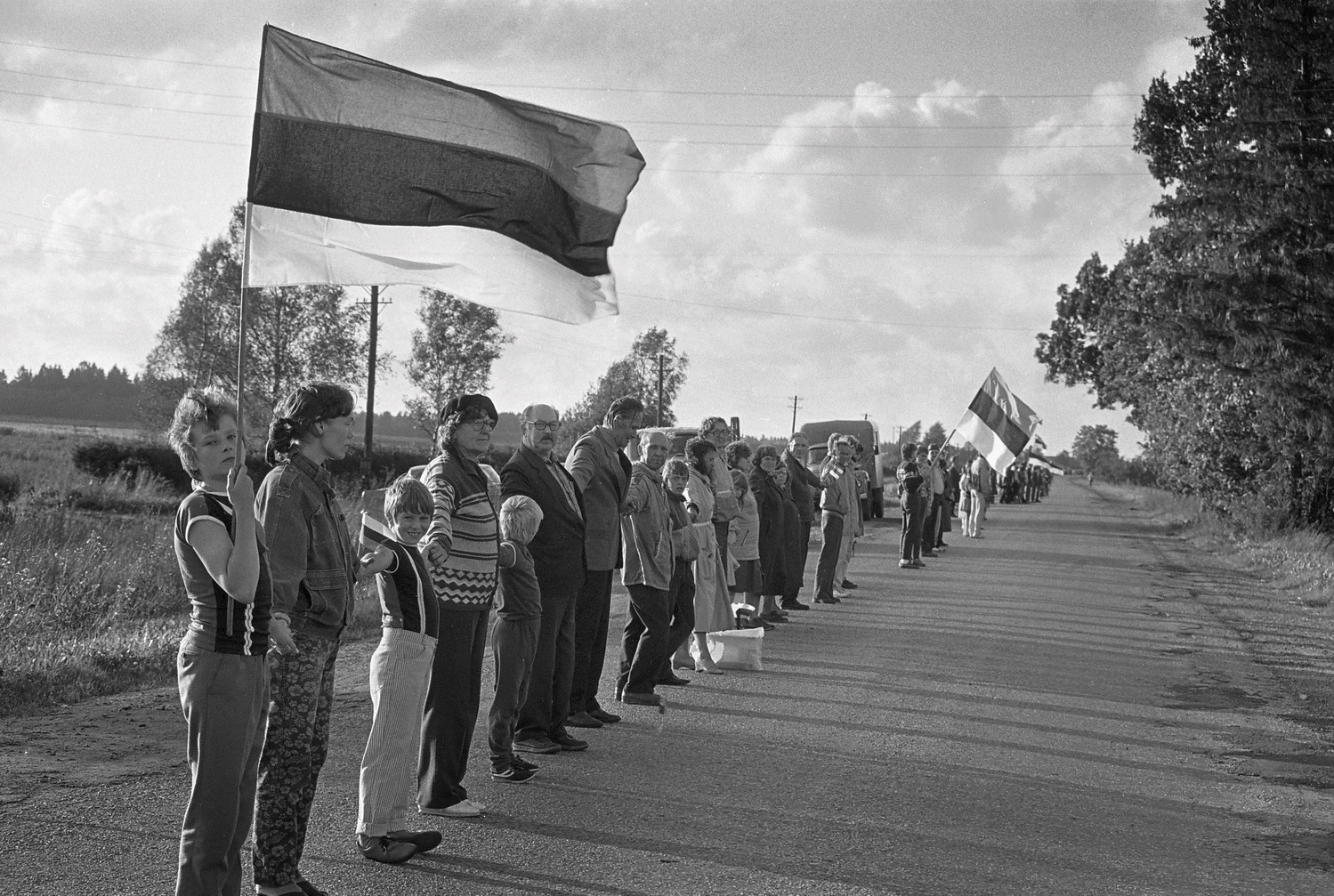
In Estonia

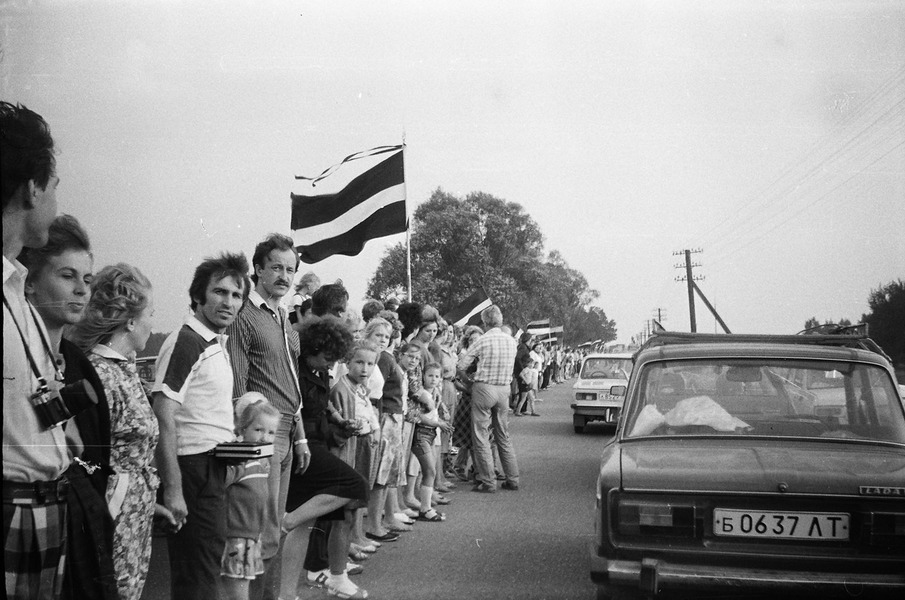
In Latvia

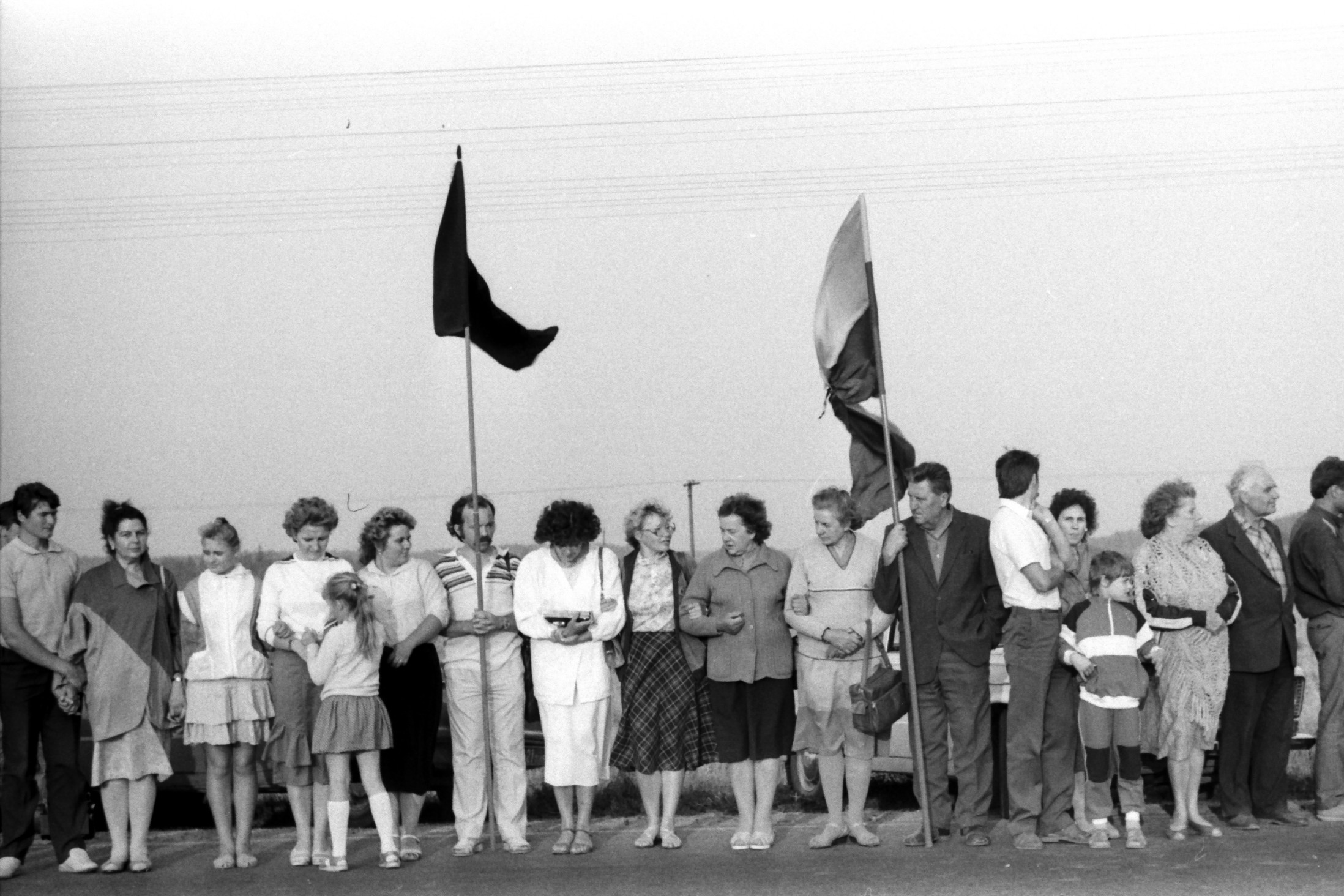
In Lithuania

=== Immediate aftermath ===
"Matters have gone far. There is a serious threat to the fate of the Baltic peoples. People should know the abyss into which they are being pushed by their nationalistic leaders. Should they achieve their goals, the possible consequences could be catastrophic to these nations. A question could arise as to their very existence."

— Declaration of the Central Committee on the situation in the Soviet Baltic republics, 26 August

On 26 August 1989, a pronouncement from the Central Committee of the Communist Party was read during the opening 19 minutes of Vremya, the main evening news program on Soviet television. It was a sternly worded warning about growing "nationalist, extremist groups" which advanced "anti-socialist and anti-Soviet" agendas. The announcement claimed that these groups discriminated against ethnic minorities and terrorised those still loyal to Soviet ideals. Local authorities were openly criticised for their failure to stop these activists. The Baltic Way was referred to as a "nationalist hysteria." According to the pronouncement, such developments would lead to an "abyss" and "catastrophic" consequences. The workers and peasants were called on to save the situation and defend Soviet ideals. Overall, there were mixed messages; while indirectly threatening the use of force, it also placed hopes that the conflict could be solved via diplomatic means. It was interpreted that the Central Committee had not yet decided which way to go and had left both possibilities open. The call to pro-Soviet masses illustrated that Moscow believed it still had a significant audience in the Baltics. Sharp criticism of Baltic Communist Parties was interpreted as signalling that Moscow would attempt to replace their leadership. However, almost immediately after the broadcast, the tone in Moscow began to soften and the Soviet authorities failed to follow up on any of their threats. Eventually, according to historian Alfred Erich Senn, the pronouncement became a source of embarrassment.

President of the United States George H. W. Bush and Chancellor of West Germany Helmut Kohl urged peaceful reforms and criticised the Molotov–Ribbentrop Pact. On 31 August, the Baltic activists issued a joint declaration to Javier Pérez de Cuéllar, Secretary-General of the United Nations. They claimed to be under threat of aggression and asked for an international commission to be sent to monitor the situation. On 19–20 September, the Central Committee of the Communist Party convened to discuss the nationality question – something Mikhail Gorbachev had been postponing since early 1988. The plenum did not specifically address the situation in the Baltic states and reaffirmed old principles regarding the centralised Soviet Union and the dominant role of the Russian language. It did promise some increase in autonomy, but was contradictory and failed to address the underlying reasons for the conflict.

== Evaluation ==
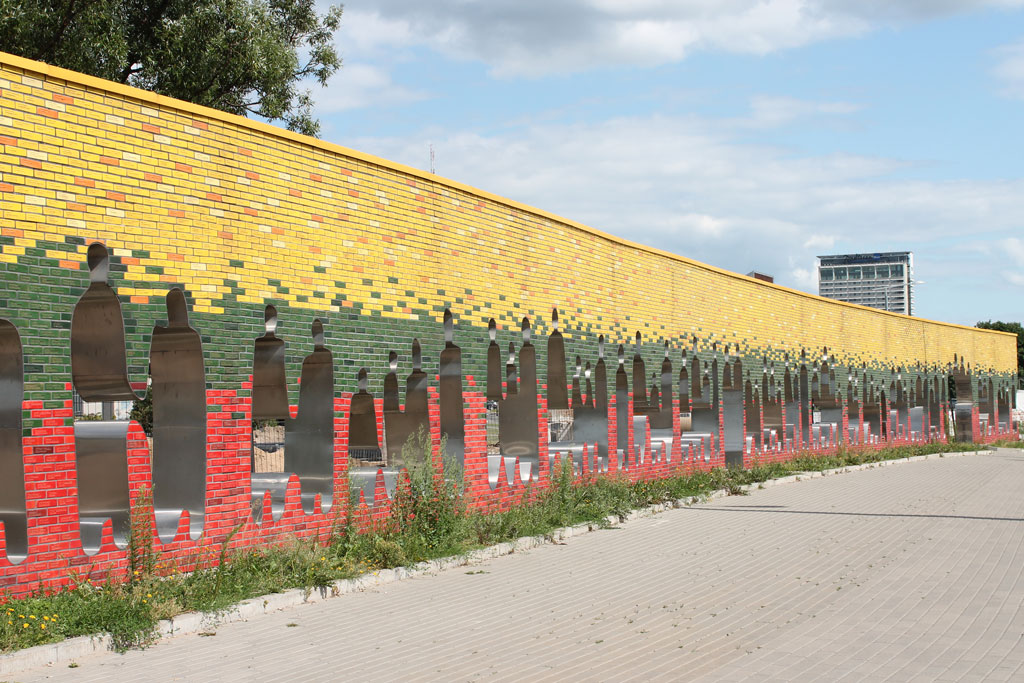
Baltic Way Monument in Vilnius

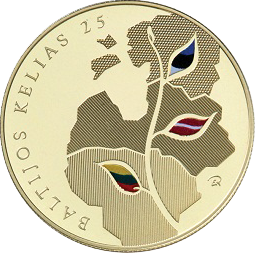
Litas commemorative coin dedicated to the Baltic Way

2014 Lithuanian stamp

The human chain helped to publicise the Baltic cause around the world and symbolised solidarity among the Baltic peoples. The positive image of the non-violent Singing Revolution rapidly spread among the Western media. The activists, including Vytautas Landsbergis, utilized the increased exposure to position the debate over Baltic independence as a moral, apart from just a political question; reclaiming independence would be the restoration of historical justice and the liquidation of Stalinism. It was an emotional event that strengthened the determination to seek independence. The protest highlighted that the pro-independence movements, established just a year prior, evolved to become more assertive and radical; they shifted from demanding greater freedom from Moscow to full national independence.

In December 1989, the Congress of People's Deputies accepted and Mikhail Gorbachev signed the report by Alexander Yakovlev's commission that condemned the secret protocols of the Molotov–Ribbentrop Pact. In February 1990, the first free democratic elections to the Supreme Soviets took place in all three Baltic states, resulting in the pro-independence candidates winning majorities of the votes. On 11 March 1990, within seven months of the Baltic Way, Lithuania became the first Soviet state to declare independence. The independence of all three Baltic states was recognised by most Western countries by the end of 1991.

This protest was one of the earliest and longest unbroken human chains in history. Similar human chains were later organised in many Eastern European countries and regions of the USSR and, more recently, in Taiwan (228 Hand-in-Hand Rally) and Catalonia (Catalan Way). On the 30th anniversary of the Baltic Way, a 30-mile (48 km) human chain called the Hong Kong Way was formed during the 2019–20 Hong Kong protests. On August 23, 2020, the Baltic states did a reenactment including Belarus for Belarusian activists. In 2009, the documents recording the Baltic Way were added to UNESCO's Memory of the World Register in recognition of their value in documenting history. In 2013, footprint monuments designed by sculptor Gitenis Umbras were installed in all three Baltic capitals to commemorate the 25th anniversary of the demonstration.

== See also ==
- The Baltics Are Waking Up
- Hands Across America (1986)
- Tiananmen Square protest (1989)
- Pan-European Picnic in Hungary (1989)
- 71st anniversary of Ukrainian unification (1990)
- 228 Hand-in-Hand rally in Taiwan (2004)
- Catalan Way (2013)
- Hong Kong Way (2019)
