= Human Chain for Basque Self-determination, 2014 =

Human Chain for Basque Self-determination
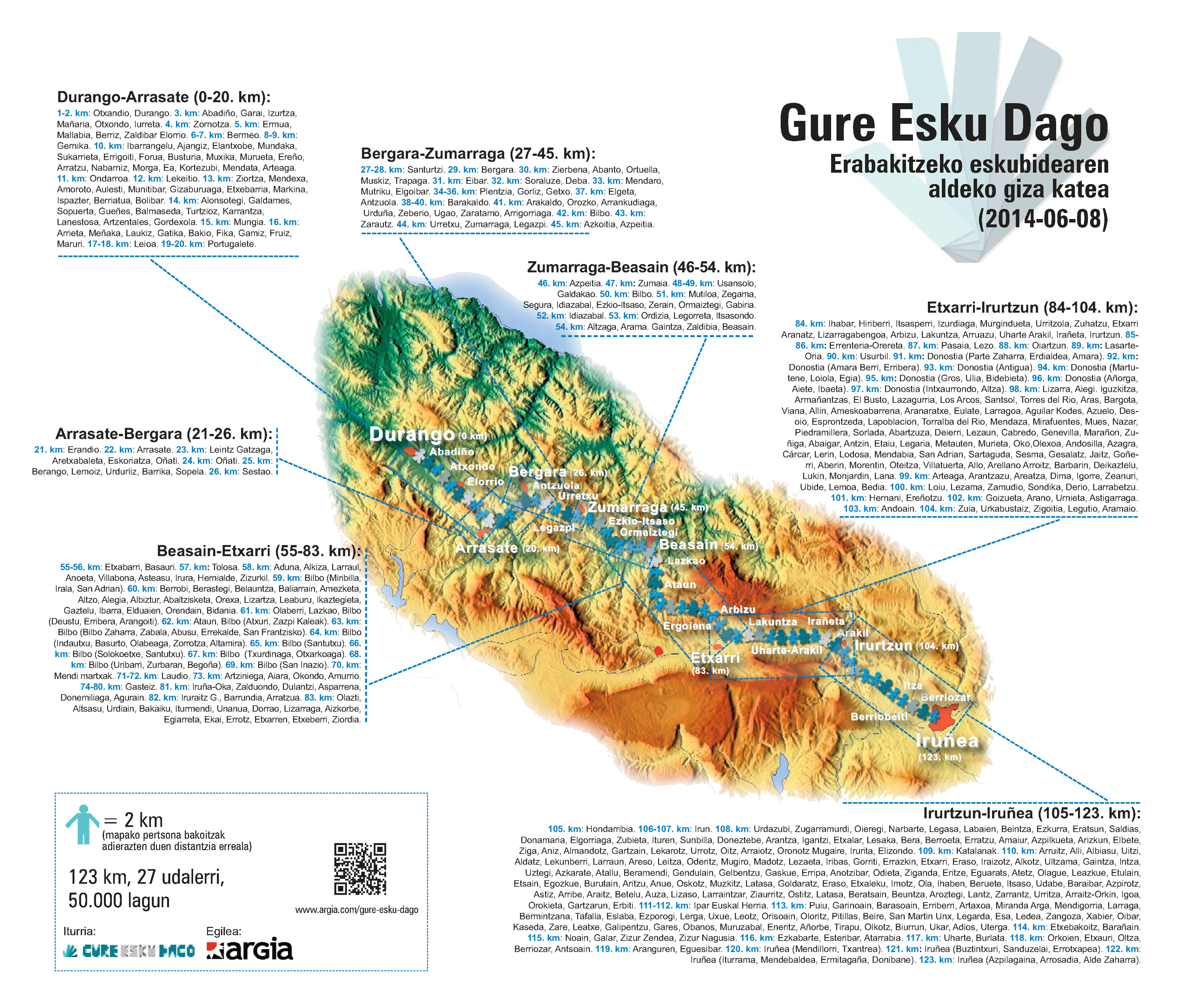
- Map of the chain's route
- Date: 8 June 2014
- Location: Basque Country
- Caused by: Political rights of the Basque people
- Methods: Human chain

Number
150,000 protestors	

The Human Chain for Basque Self-determination, also called gure ESKU bidea (Basque words which mean "our right" and also "the way is in our hands," as a pun), was a human chain and demonstration held on 8 June 2014 in the Basque Country, claiming the Basque people's right to decide about their political status, eventually as a nation. It linked Durango (Biscay) to Iruñea (Navarre) by a human chain along 123 km. It was called by Gure Esku Dago (Basque for "It's in Our Hands"). About 150,000 persons participated in the human chain, according to the organization's estimates.

== Gallery ==
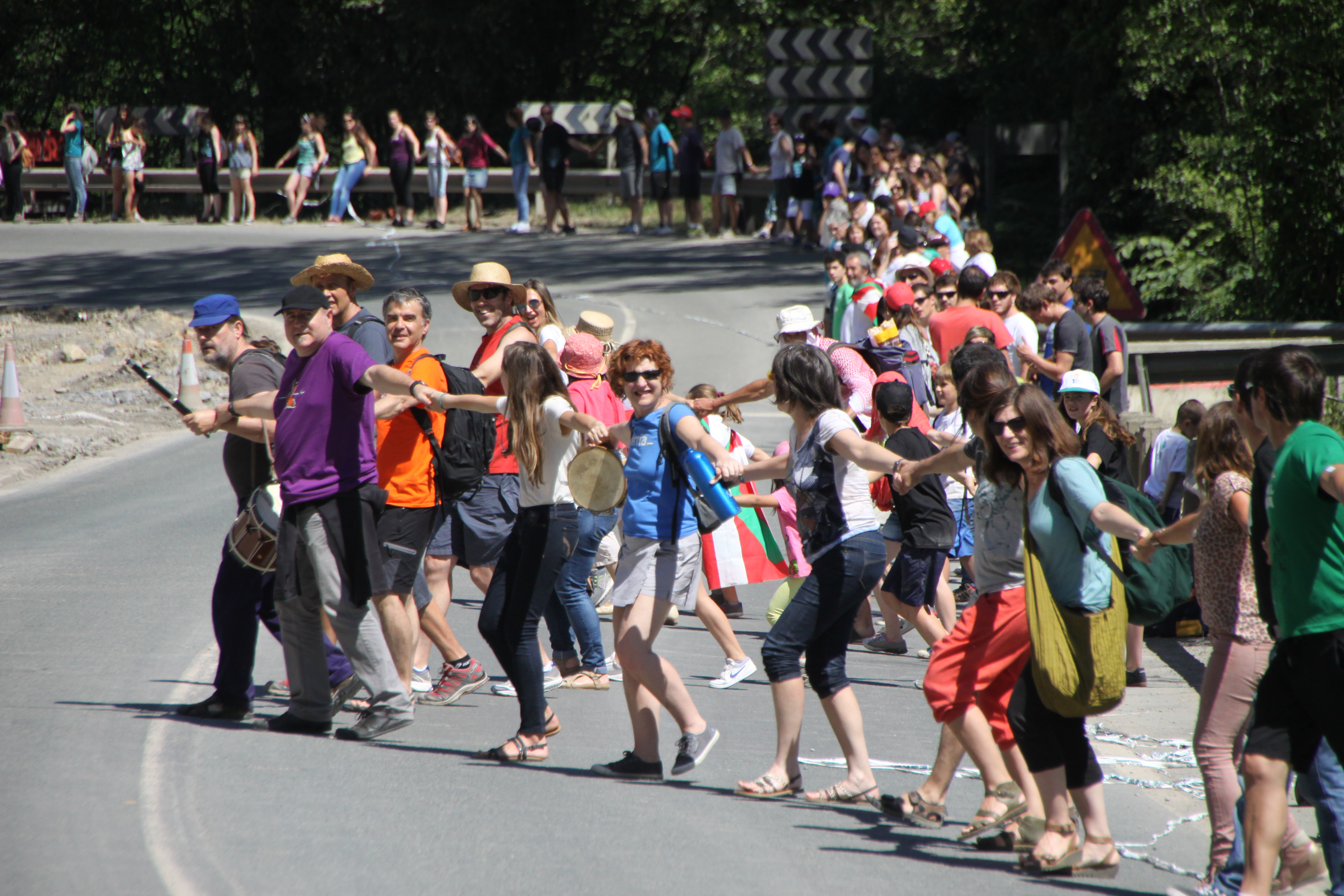

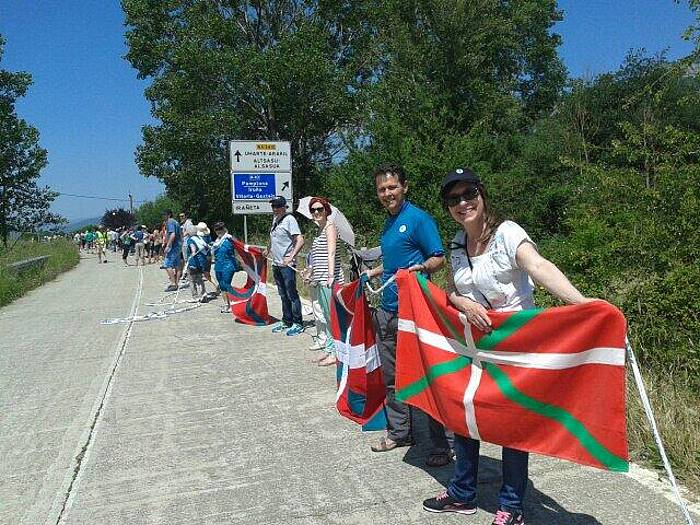

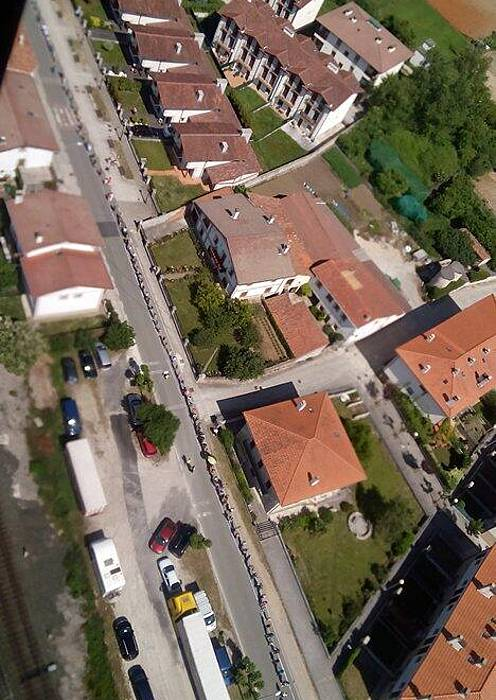

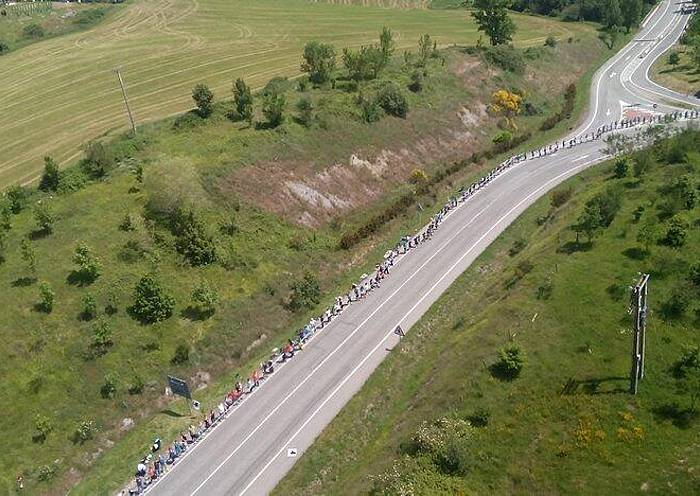

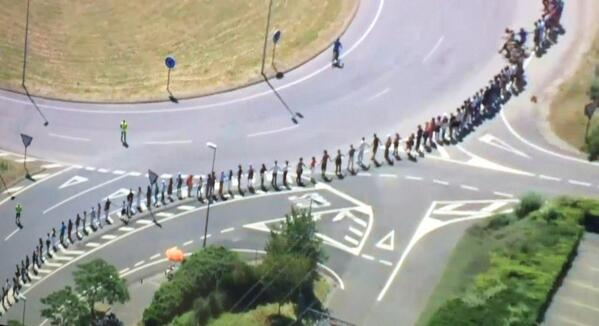

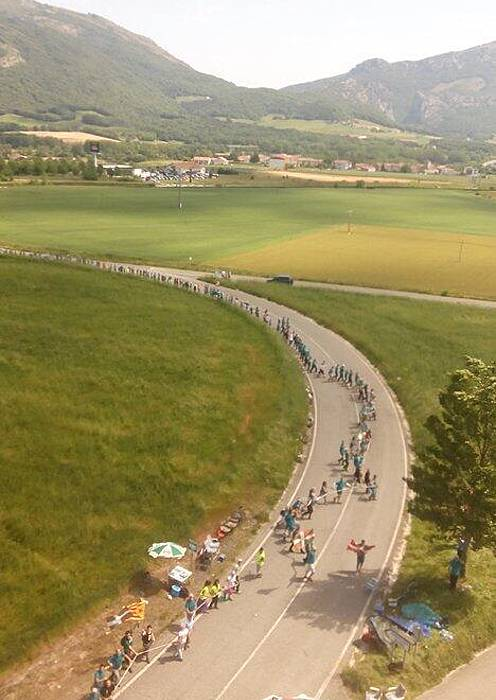
Navarre.

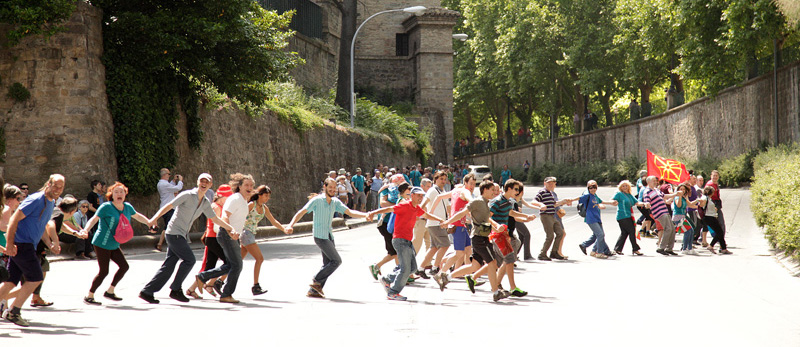
Iruñea-Pamplona.

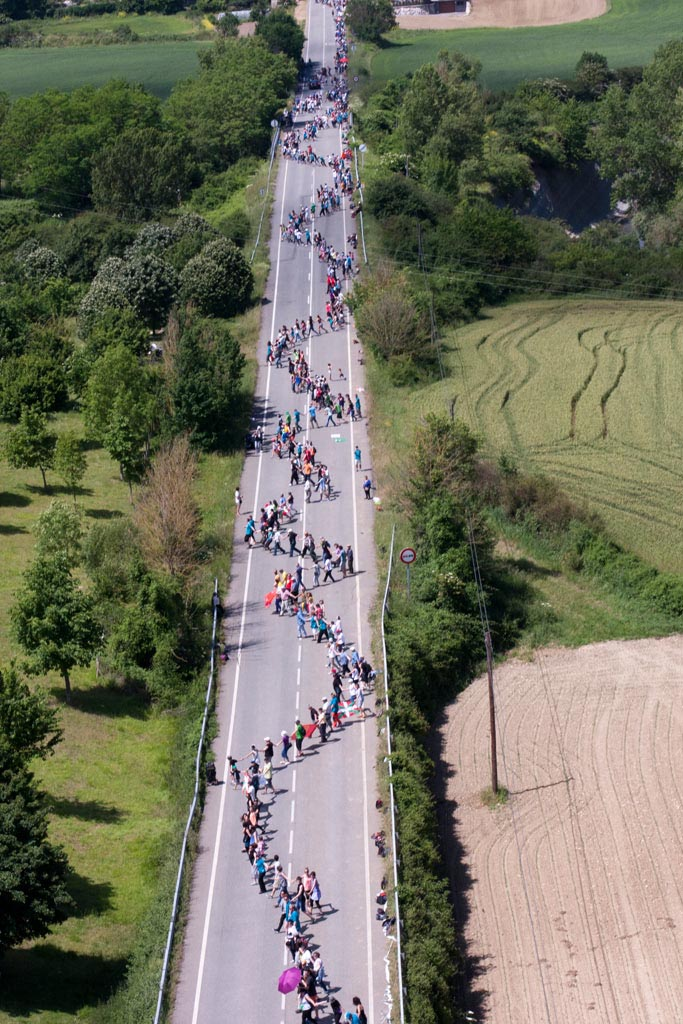

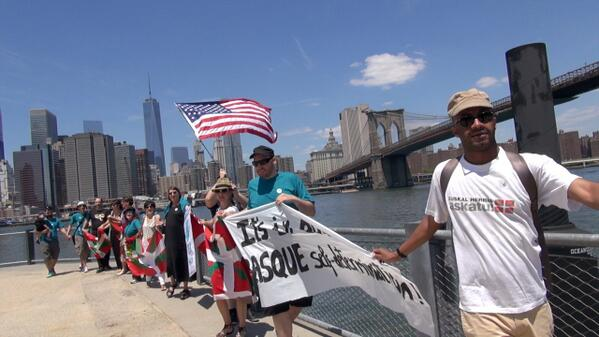
New York City.

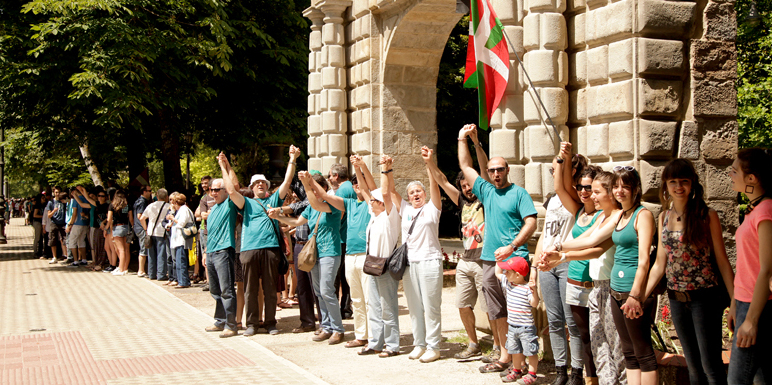
Iruñea-Pamplona.

== See also ==
- Catalan Way
- Hong Kong Way
- Human Chain for Basque Self-determination, 2018
