= 228 Hand-in-Hand rally =

2004 human chain in Taiwan

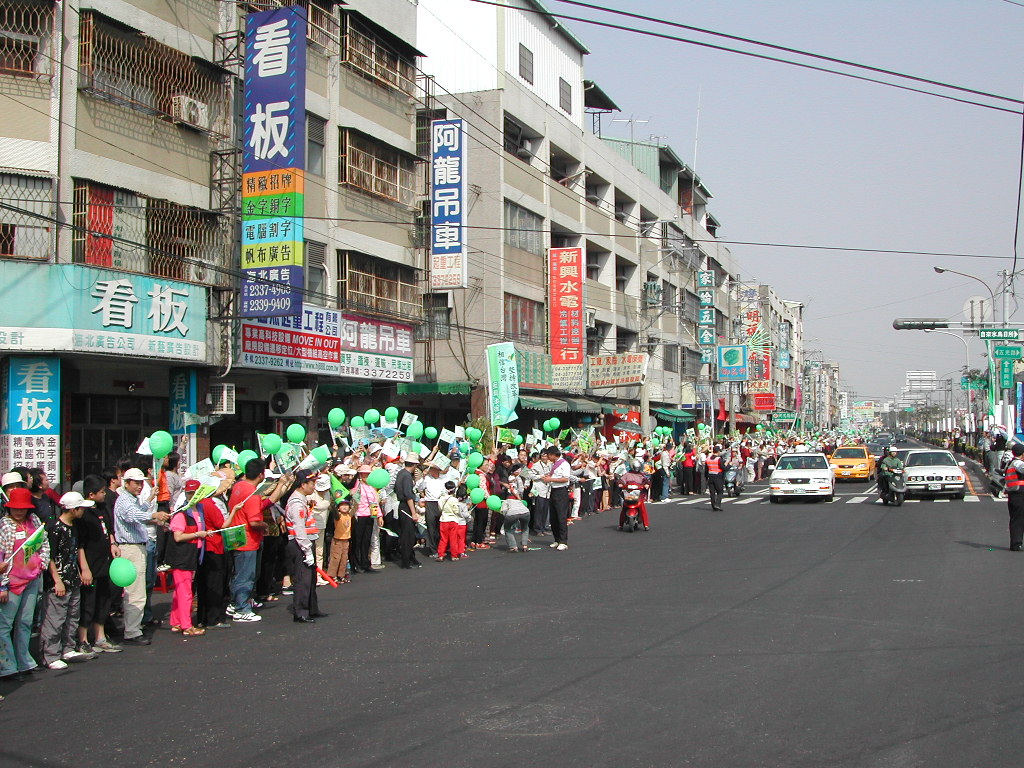
- 228 Hand-in-Hand Rally
- Traditional Chinese: 228百萬人手牽手護台灣
- Simplified Chinese: 228百万人手牵手护台湾
- Literal meaning: One million people hand-in-hand to protect Taiwan on February 28
Transcriptions
Standard Mandarin
- Hanyu Pinyin: 228 Bǎiwànrén Shǒuqiānshǒu Hù Táiwān
Southern Min
- Hokkien POJ: 228 Pah-bān-lâng Chhiú-khan-chhiú Hō͘ Tâi-oân

The 228 Hand-in-Hand rally was a demonstration in the form of a human chain held in Taiwan on February 28, 2004, the 57th anniversary of the February 28 Incident. Approximately two million (estimation ranged from 1.2 to 2.3 million depending on the reporting media) Taiwanese formed a 500-kilometer (310 mi) long human chain from Keelung to Pingtung County to commemorate the incident, to call for peace, and to protest the deployment of missiles by the People's Republic of China aimed at Taiwan along the coast. The rally was the largest in Taiwanese history.

== Origin ==
The demonstration was inspired by Baltic Way, the human chain comprising two million that was organized in the Baltic states in 1989. Although billed as "non-political", the event was organized by the Pan-Green Coalition and took place only a few weeks before the 2004 Taiwanese presidential election. Some of the symbolism of the demonstration, particularly at the point in the event where participants "turn away from China" veered clearly toward support of Taiwanese independence, and hence was not attended by members of the Pan-Blue Coalition who countered the demonstration with an island-wide rally of their own days later.

== Human chain ==
The human chain started at the northern tip of Taiwan in Hoping Island near Keelung, stretched 500 kilometers through 18 Taiwanese cities and counties, and ended in Pingtung County.

In Taipei, people linked hands in front of the Presidential Office Building.

President Chen Shui-bian and former president Lee Teng-hui joined hands in Miaoli County.

== See also ==
- Catalan Way
- Wild Lily student movement
- Sunflower Student Movement
