= Human Chain for Basque Self-determination, 2018 =

Political demonstration

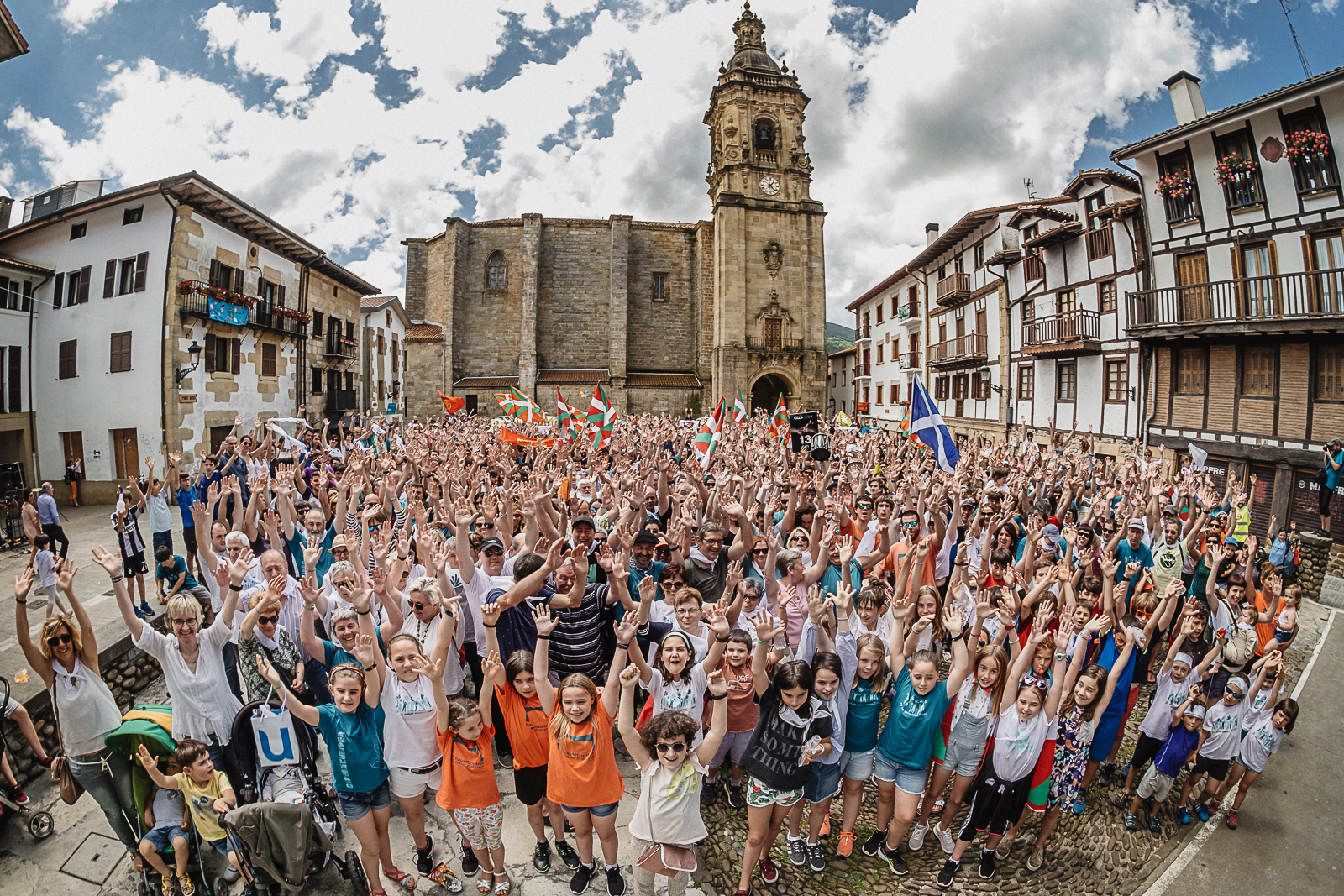
Gathering in Usurbil ahead of the alignment

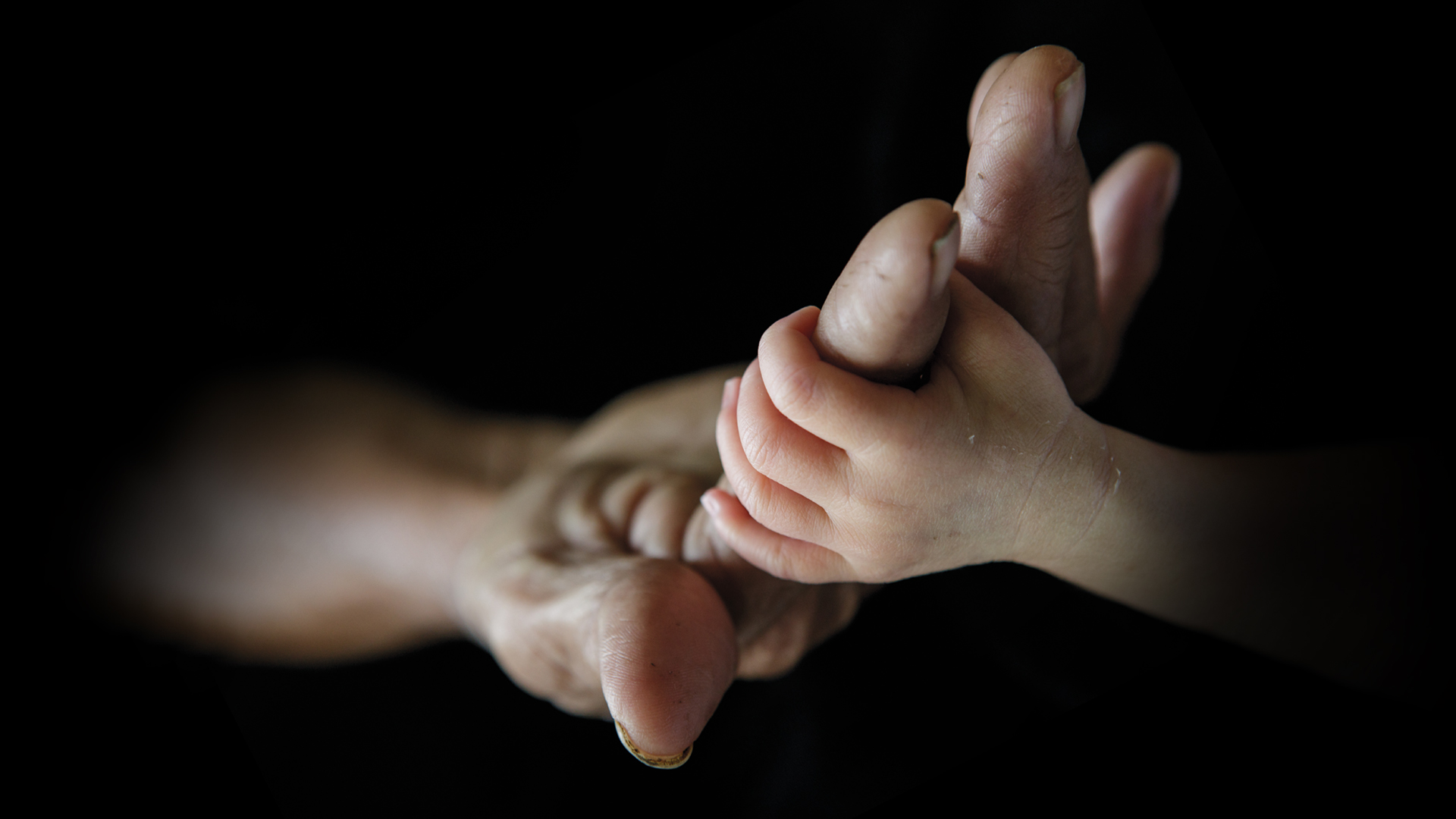
Motif publicizing the human chain

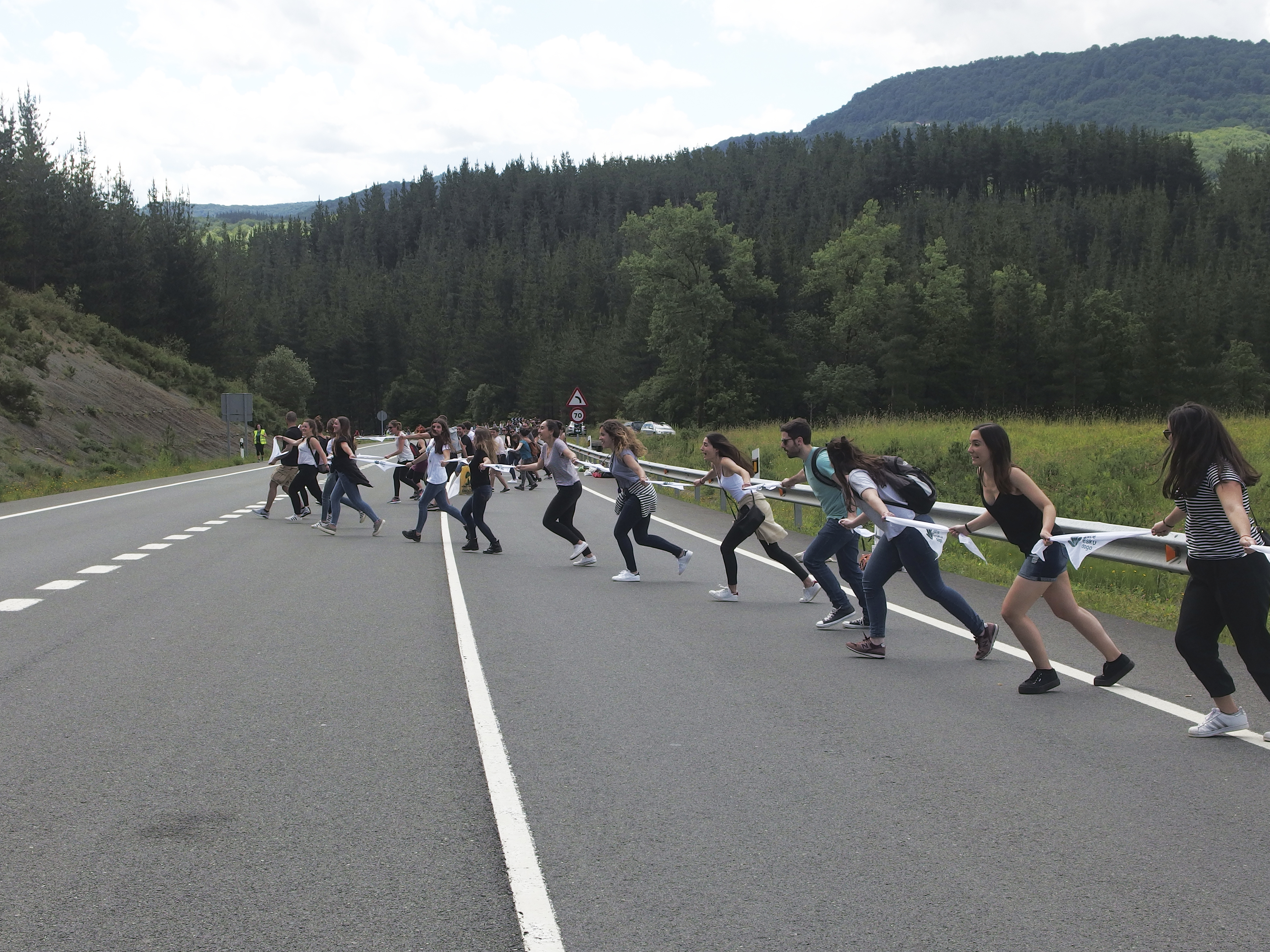
Km 163–165 near Getxo (Biscay)

The Human Chain for Basque Self-determination, 2018 took place on 10 June in the Basque Autonomous Community of Spain organized by the movement Gure Esku Dago ("It is in our hands") advocating for a self-determination vote with an independence option for the whole of the Basque Country. It counted on the active support of the Basque National Party (PNV), EH Bildu, and Elkarrekin Podemos, the main forces of the autonomous region.

The human chain held on Sunday connected at noon the cities of Donostia (San Sebastián), Bilbao and Vitoria-Gasteiz, extending for 202 kilometres (125 miles), gathering approximately 175,000 protesters. It relied on the support of 5,000 volunteers and drew on the use of 1,000 coaches for transportation. The event was attended, among others, by Juan Mari Aburto, mayor of Bilbao, and senior PNV officials Andoni Ortuzar and Itxaso Atutxa. However, the lehendakari Iñigo Urkullu (the region's premier) did not take a clear position on the initiative.

The organizers drafted a document they handed over to the Basque Parliament with a seat in Vitoria-Gasteiz demanding it open the avenues necessary to carry out the vote including an independence option. The 1978 Spanish Constitution forbids independence inasmuch as it states that "Spain is one and indivisible".

== See also ==
- Human Chain for Basque Self-determination, 2014
- Catalan Way
- Hong Kong Way
