= Vanitha Mathil =

Chain of women formed on 1 January 2019 at Kerala

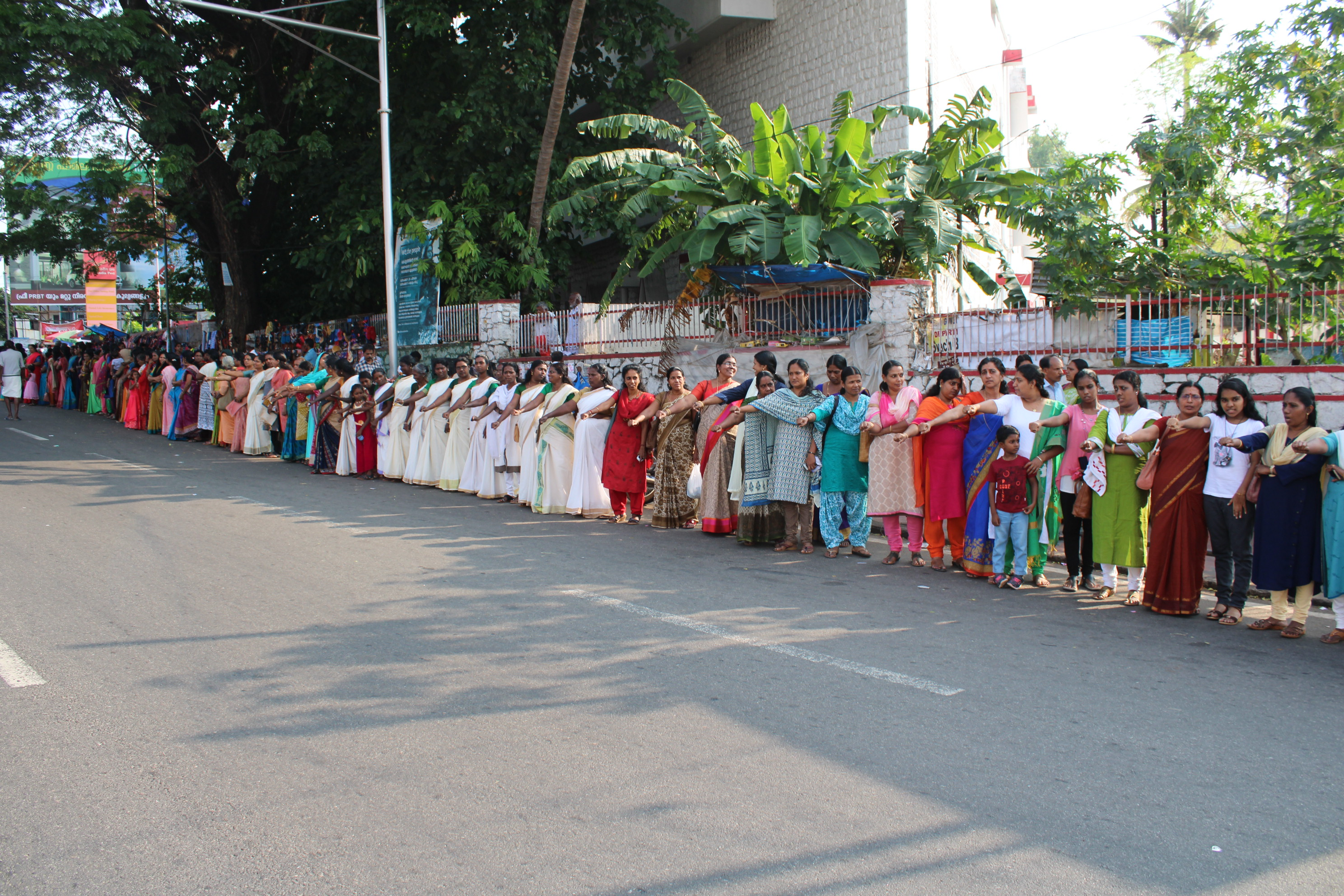
- Women's Wall at Kollam
- Date: 1 January 2019
- Location: Kerala, India
- Type: Human chain
- Motive: To uphold gender equality and protest against gender discrimination in entry rules at Sabarimala
- Organised by: Government of Kerala
- Participants: Around three to five million women

Vanitha Mathil ("Women's Wall") was a human chain formed on 1 January 2019 across the Indian state of Kerala to uphold gender equality and protest against gender discrimination. The wall was formed solely by women and extended for a distance of around 620 kilometres (390 miles) from Kasargod to Thiruvananthapuram. Around three to five million women participated in the event.

== Background ==
In Kerala, the Hindu temple at Sabarimala traditionally barred women between the ages of 10 and 50 from entering to worship Ayyappa. Some people claimed women were barred because menstruation is impure, but devotees claimed they are not allowed because of the celibate nature of the deity. In September 2018, the Supreme Court of India, in a historic verdict, allowed women of all ages to enter the temple, stating that any discrimination based on biological differences is clearly unconstitutional. The ruling coalition of the state Left Democratic Front welcomed the judgment, while opposition parties like the Bharatiya Janata Party and the Indian National Congress launched protests opposing the verdict. Many Hindu groups protested against the judgment and the state government's decision to implement it.

== Wall ==
On 15 December 2018, Kerala's Chief Minister Pinarayi Vijayan announced after meeting with 176 social and political organisations that the women's wall would be held on New Year's Day to protect the renaissance values of the state. A theme song for the event by Prabha Varma was released.

On 1 January 2019 at 4:00 pm, the wall was formed by around three to five million women along the national highways of the state of Kerala for around 620 kilometres (390 miles). The wall began in the northern end of the state by Kerala's Minister of Health and Social Justice K. K. Shailaja in Kasargod, and ended in Thiruvananthapuram in the south with Brinda Karat, leader of the Communist Party of India. Activists of the Rashtriya Swayamsevak Sangh and the Bharatiya Janata Party reportedly tried to attack the wall in Kasargod.

On the same day, in support of the event in Kerala, women's walls were organised in solidarity with Vanitha Mathil in other Indian cities, including New Delhi, Mumbai, and Chennai.

The women's wall in Kerala became the world's fourth largest human chain ever made, and the largest formed solely by women.
