= Cardó Massif =

Mountain massif in Catalonia, Spain

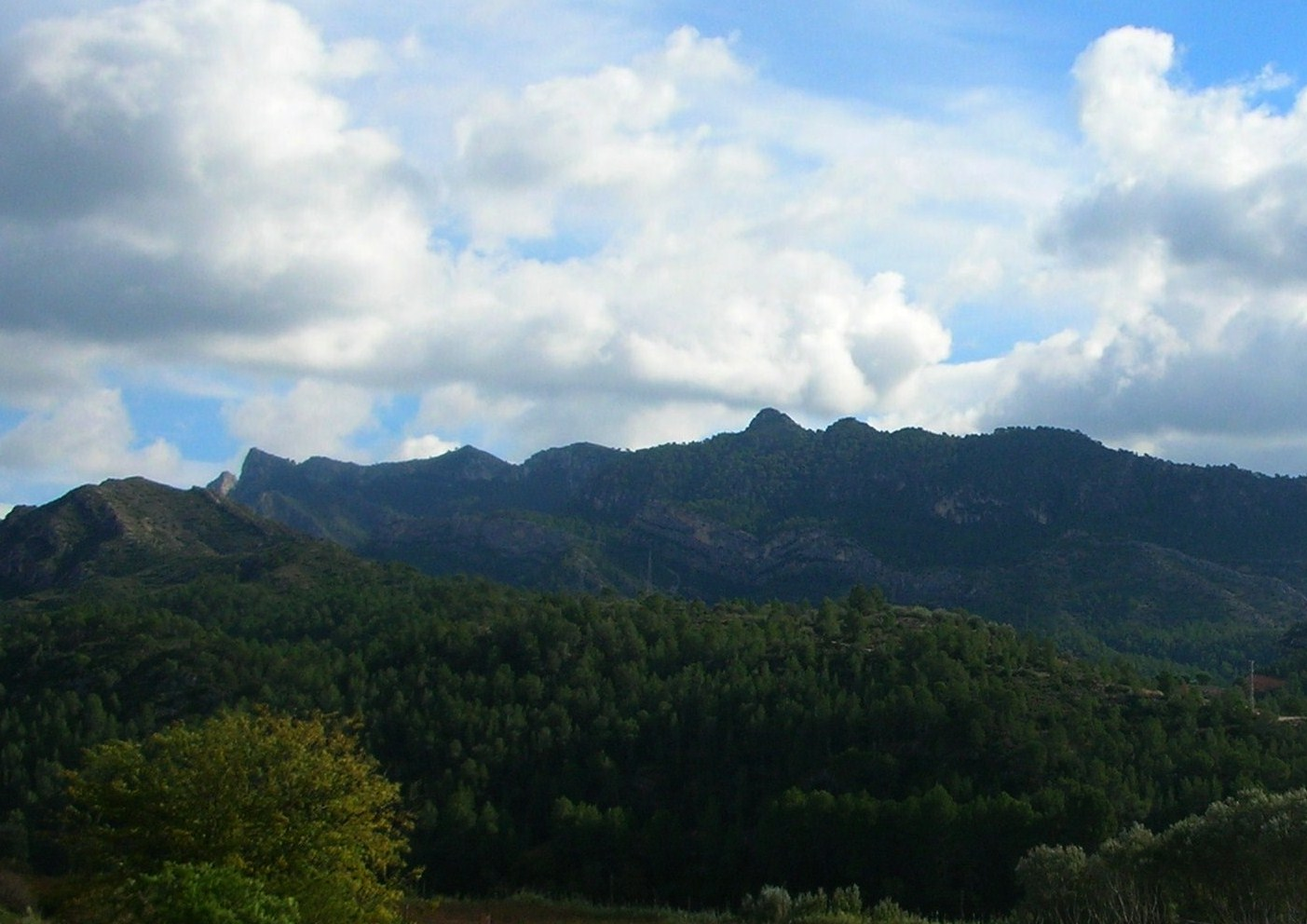
- Serra de Cardó mountain range seen from the south near Benifallet

Highest point
- Elevation: 942 m (3,091 ft)
- Coordinates: 40°54′02″N 0°35′36″E

Dimensions
- Area: 340 km^{2} (130 mi^{2})

Geography
- Location within Province of Tarragona Location within Catalonia
- Location: Baix Ebre, Catalonia, Spain
- Parent range: Catalan Pre-Coastal Range

Geology
- Mountain type: Mostly Calcareous

Climbing
- First ascent: unknown
- Easiest route: Drive from Rasquera or El Perelló

The Cardó Massif (Catalan: Massís de Cardó, IPA: [məˈsiz ðə kəɾˈðo]; Spanish: Macizo de Cardó), also known as Cardó-Boix Massif, is a mountain massif in the Baix Ebre comarca, in Catalonia, Spain. This massif is composed of a number of mountain ranges located on the left side of the Ebro river near Tortosa. The massive calcareous cliffs of the Serra de Cardó form the eastern side of the spectacular gorges through which the Ebro River winds its way in the final stage of its course, separating the Ebro Valley from the Mediterranean coastal area.

The ranges cover an area of over 340 km2, extending from Rasquera in the north, to Benifallet in the south and eastwards through El Perelló until reaching the Mediterranean Sea between L'Ampolla and L'Ametlla de Mar. Highway N-340 crosses the eastern side of the massif and Autopista AP-7 skirts the easternmost foothills by the seashore.

All the ranges are part of the Catalan Pre-Coastal Range. The main peak is Xàquera, also known as La Creu de Santos (942 m) in the Serra de Cardó, another important summit is Buinaca (764 m), located in the Serra del Boix.

Balma de Cabrafeixet is a prehistoric site below the Morral de Cabrafeixet escarpment (753 m) with cave paintings. The entrance to the cave has been closed with an iron bar door to prevent vandalism. Another cave, Cova de la Mallada, is located nearby

There are many wind turbines located on different ridges of the massif, the Parc Eòlic de les Colladetes and the Parc Eòlic de les Calobres.

== Ranges ==
The main ranges of the massif are:

- Serra de Cardó, the westernmost range and also the highest. It is often covered with snow in the winter. The vegetation of eastern slopes is largely low Mediterranean shrub, while its western side, below the jagged peaks, is forested. Autovia C-12 cuts across the westernmost end of the range, above the Ebro Gorges. The mineral water coming from springs near the ancient monastery located at the heart of the range was one of the first waters to be bottled in Spain.
- Serra del Boix, highest point Buinaca 764 m. The slopes are covered with low bush, among which Buxus (Catalan: Boix) predominates. This range occupies a central position in the massif and in some geographical works gives its name to the whole massif. The particular high rocky area with original rock formations where the highest peaks are located is known as "Les Moles". There are wind turbines atop the main eastern ridge.
- Serra de Gaviots, highest point 603 m. This largely deforested range also occupies a central position, but has smoother and less rocky crests than the ones above. There is also a very large wind farm along the ridge. Like the Serra del Boix, the higher altitudes often have snow in the winter.
- Montaspre, highest point 527 m, the southwestern foothills of the Serra de Cardó range, rising near Bítem.
- Serra de Collredó, highest point Creu de Collredó 380 m, rounded hills covered by olive trees and Mediterranean forest where many small country cottages have been recently developed.
- Serra de les Veles, highest point Coll de l'Àliga 94 m, is formed by the low southernmost foothills of the massif. This small range is crossed by highways and has been gutted by sand and gravel extraction, where the pits are used as landfills. These lower ranges very rarely have snow, even in cold winters.
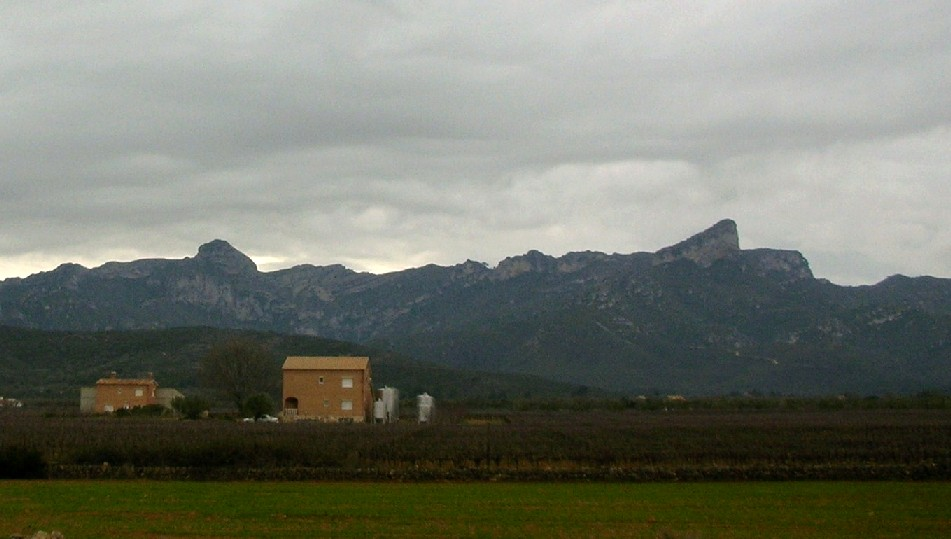
Les Moles area: La Buinaca on the left and the Cabrafeixet on the right, seen from the north between El Perelló and Rasquera

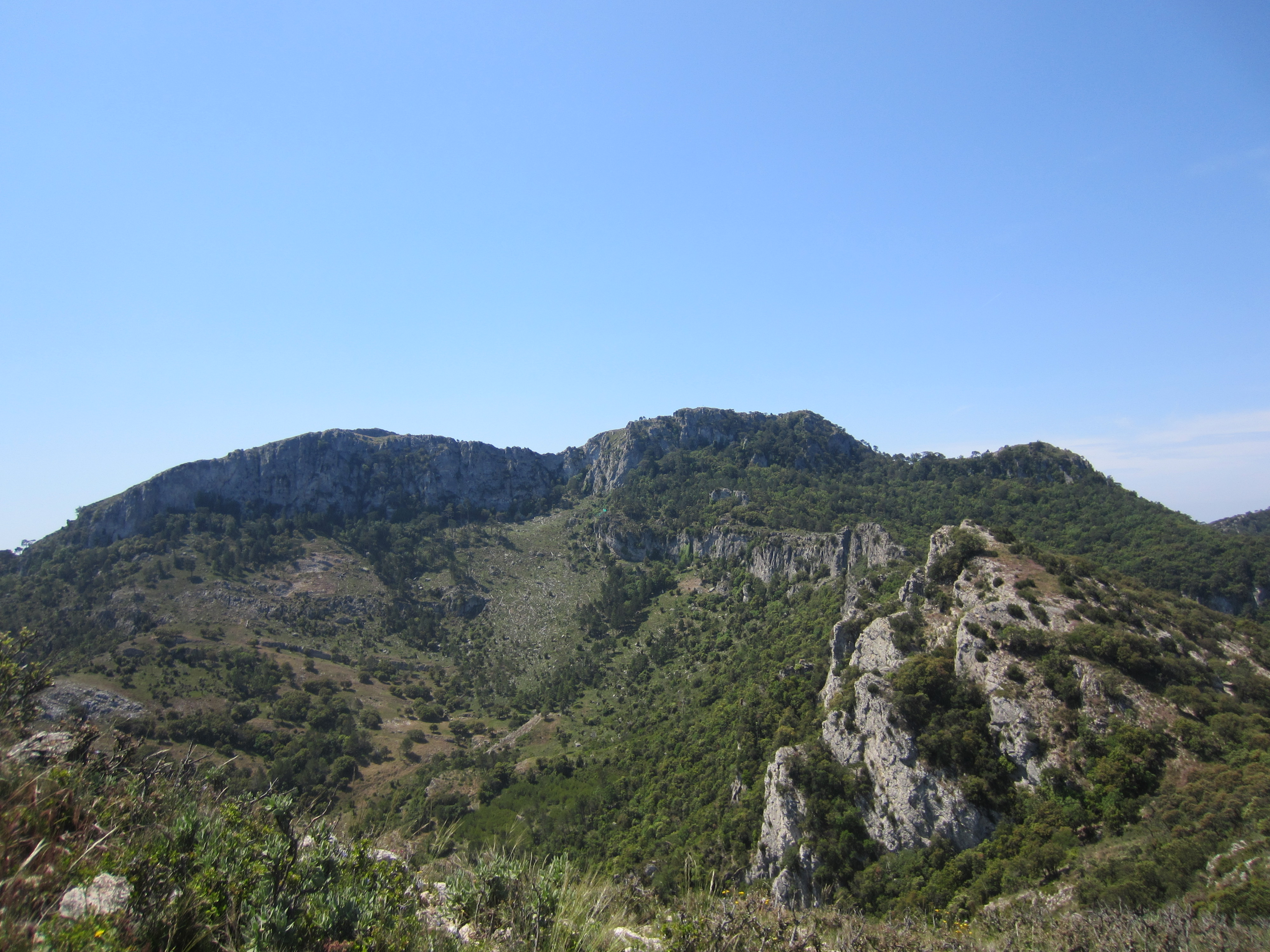
View of 942 m high Xàquera or La Creu de Santos, the highest summit of the range

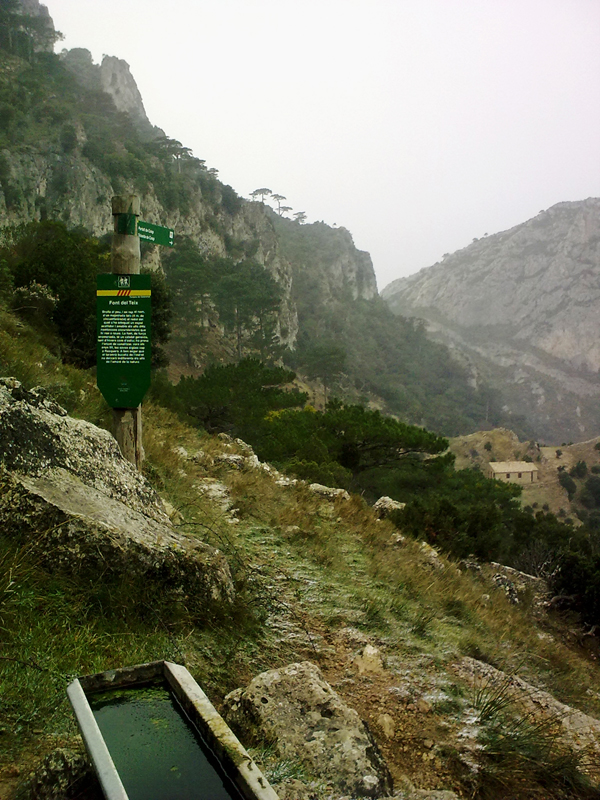
Font del Teix spring in Serra de Cardó

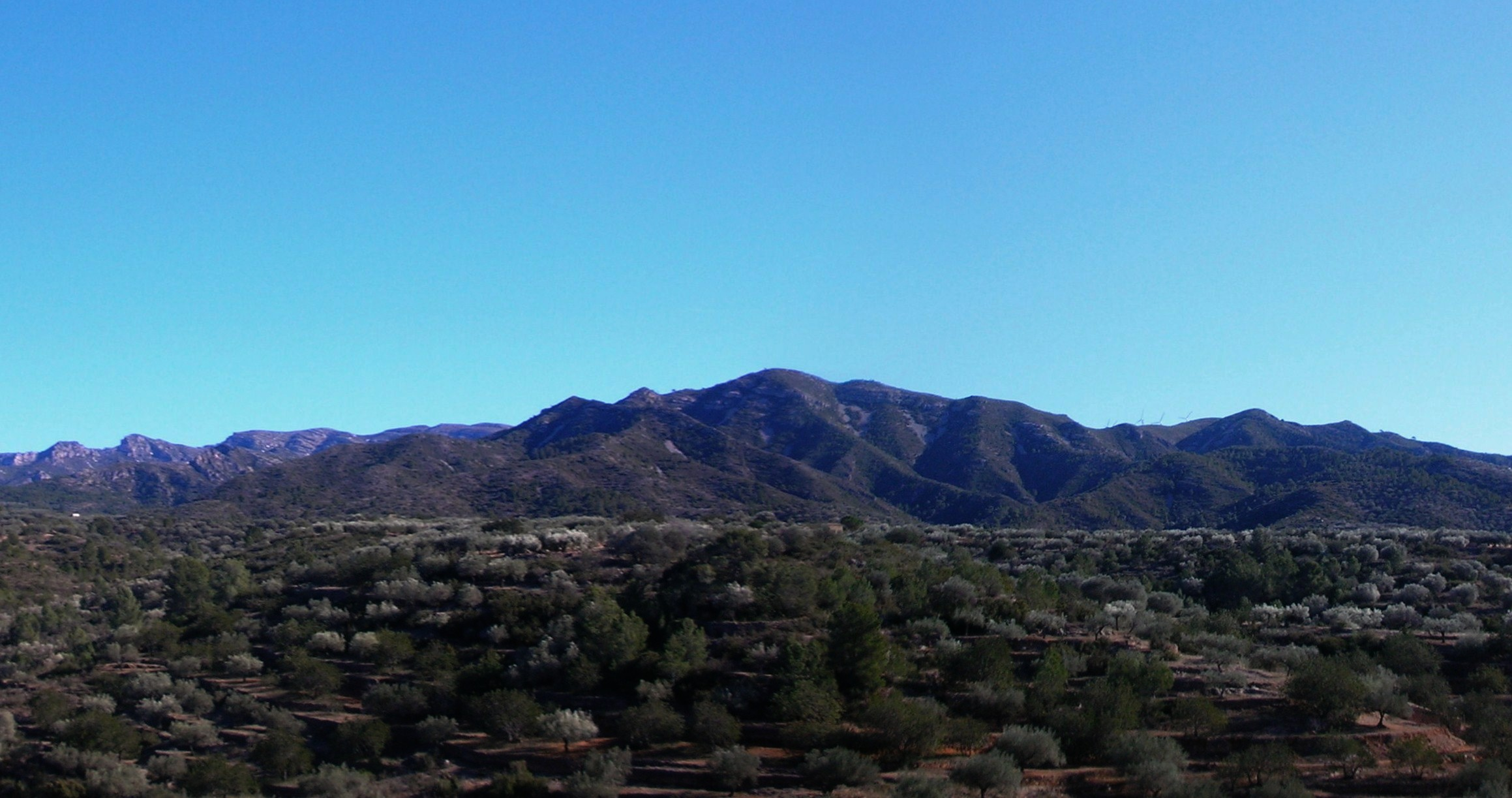
Montaspre in the Cardó Massif

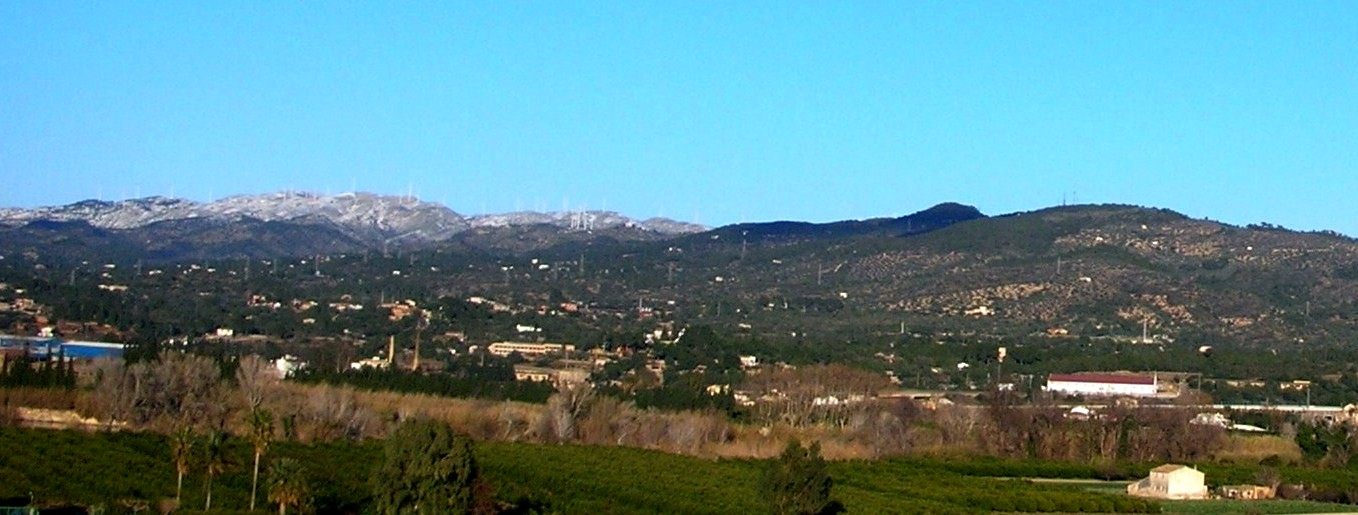
View of the Serra del Boix/Serra de Gaviots mountain ranges from the south with some snow on the higher altitudes

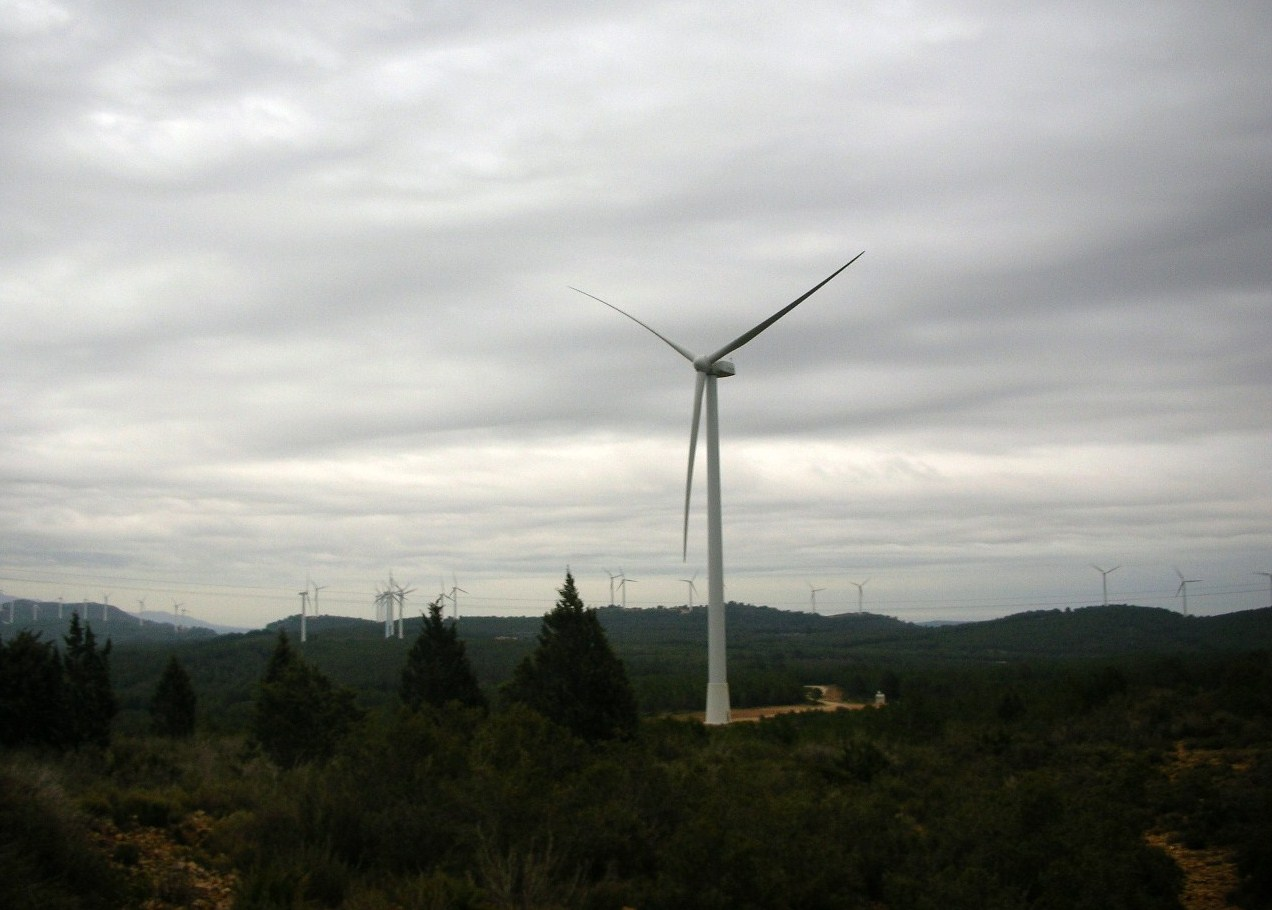
Wind farms on Serra de Gaviots

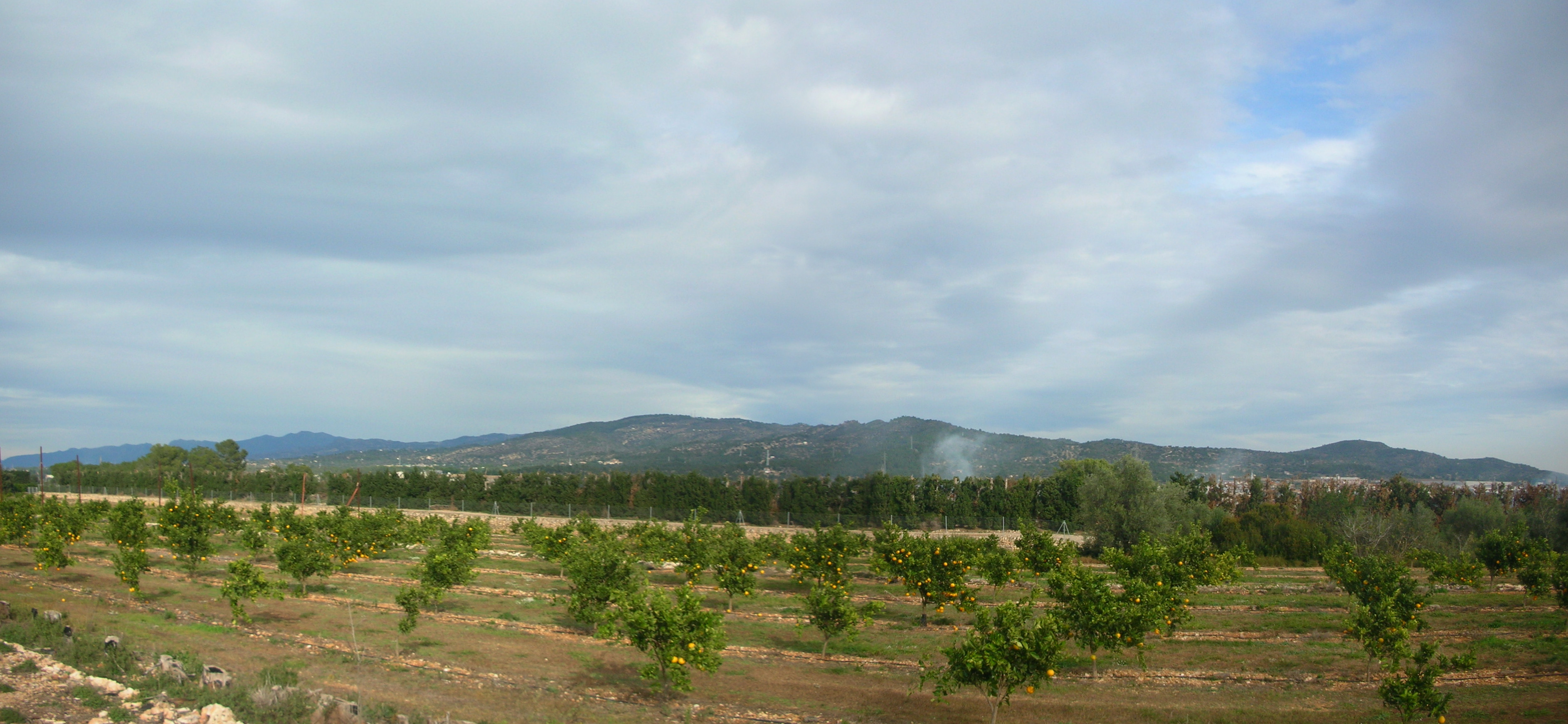
Serra de Collredó range seen from an orange grove in Mianes

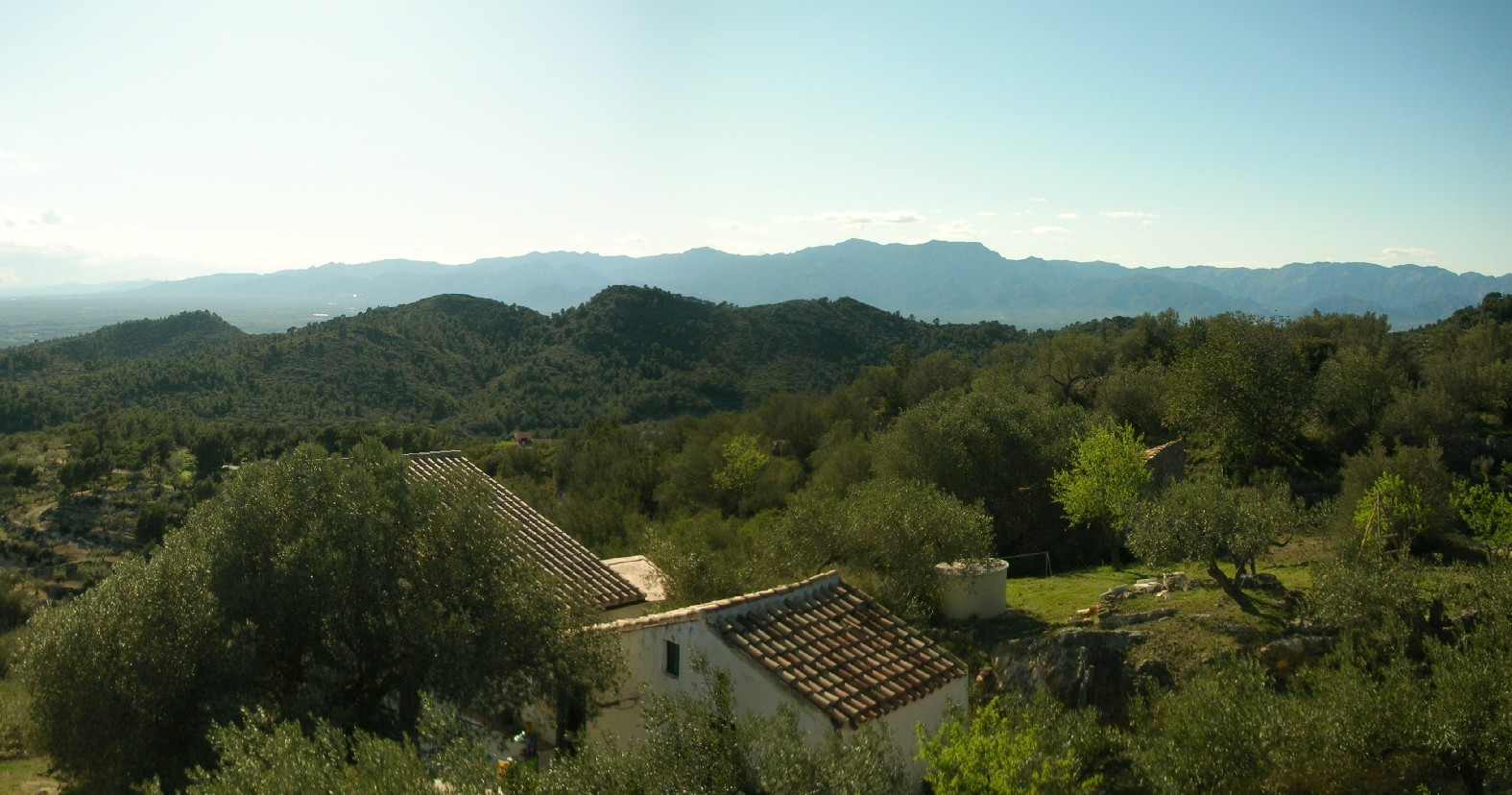
Serra de Collredó seen from the east. In the background the Ports de Beseit

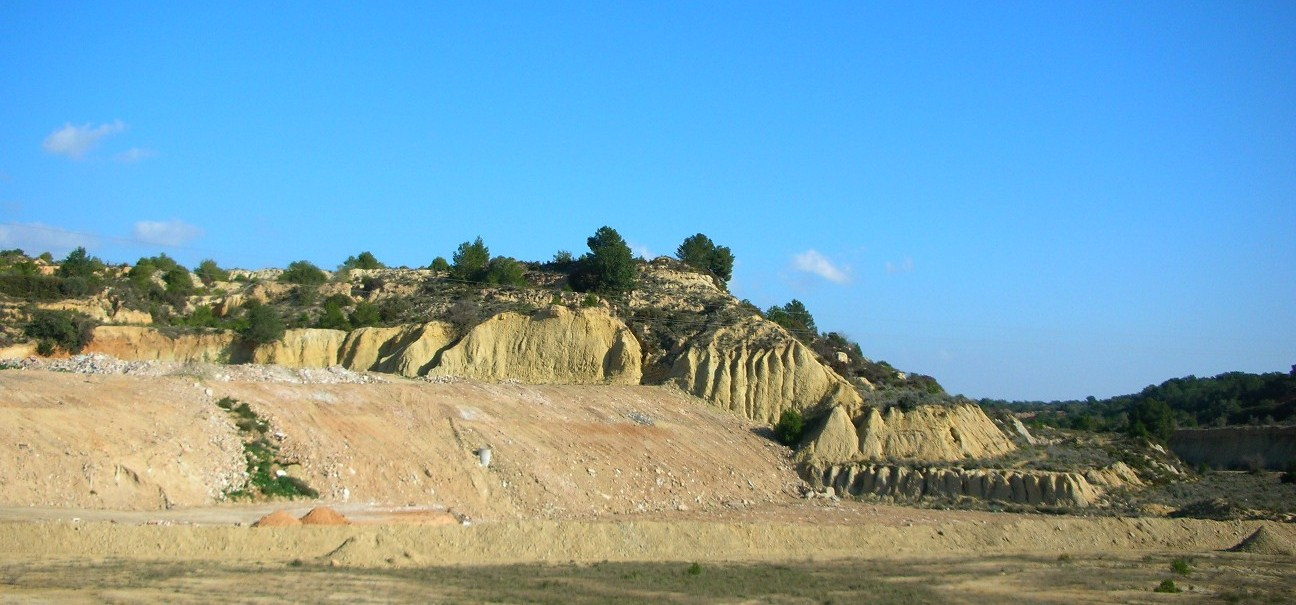
Sand mining in Serra de les Veles

== Monastery ==
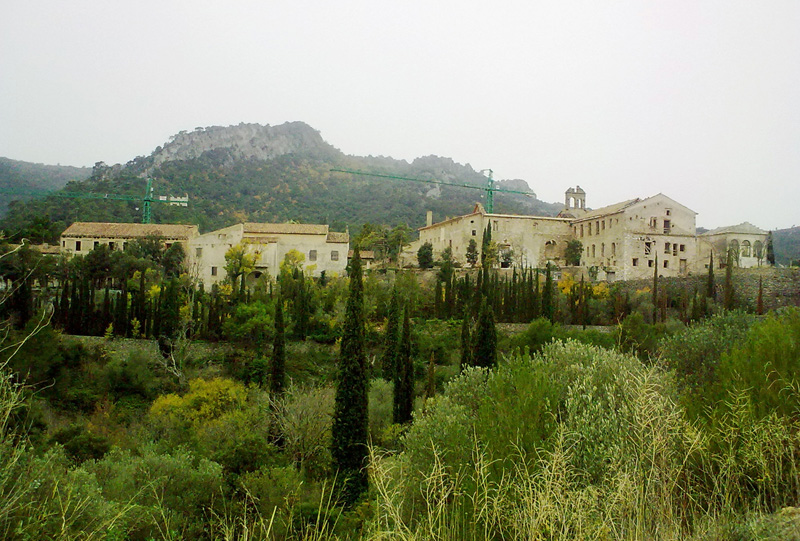
Present state of the ruined Monastery/Spa

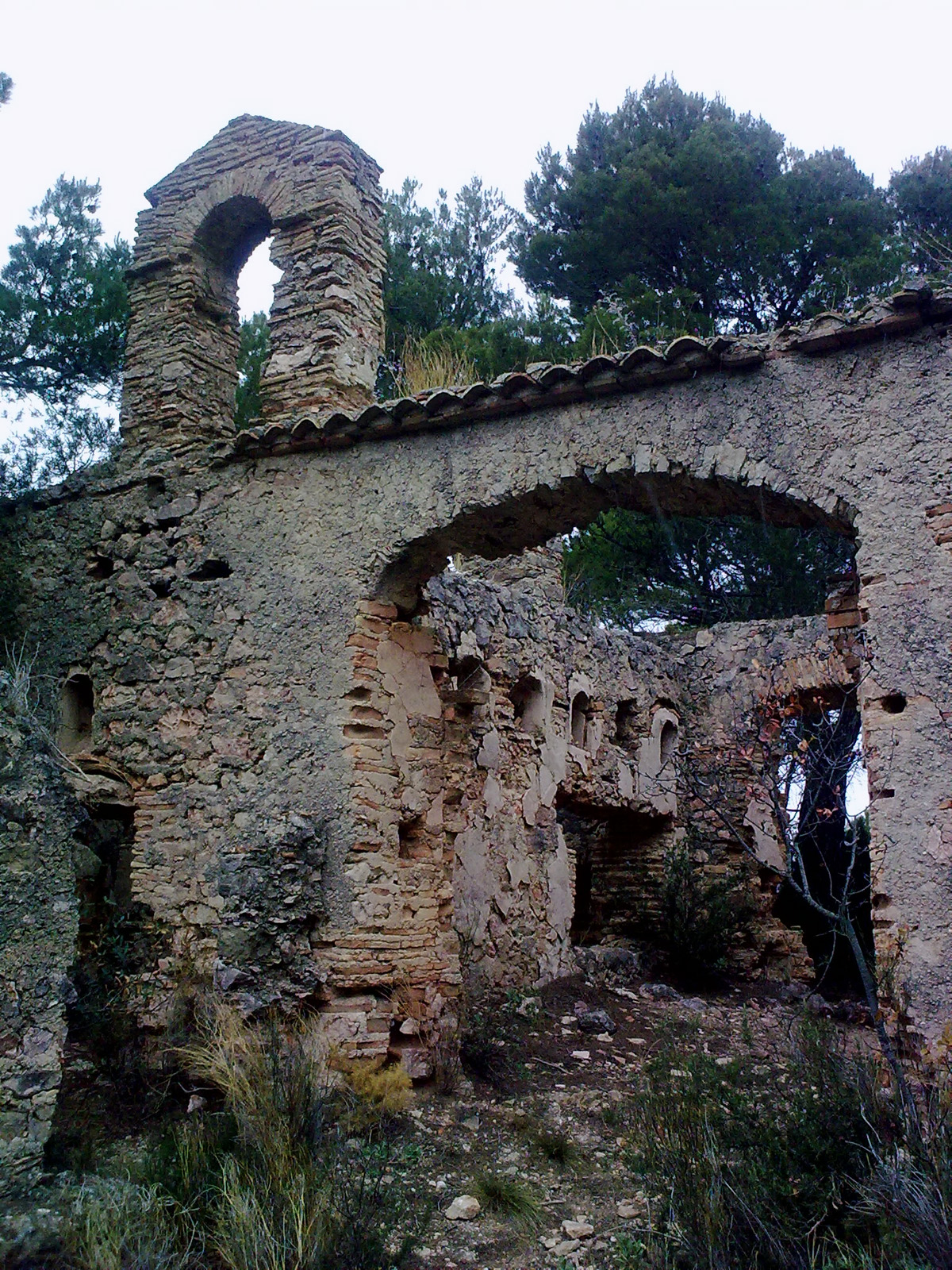
One of the many ruined hermitages near the ancient Cardó Monastery in the range

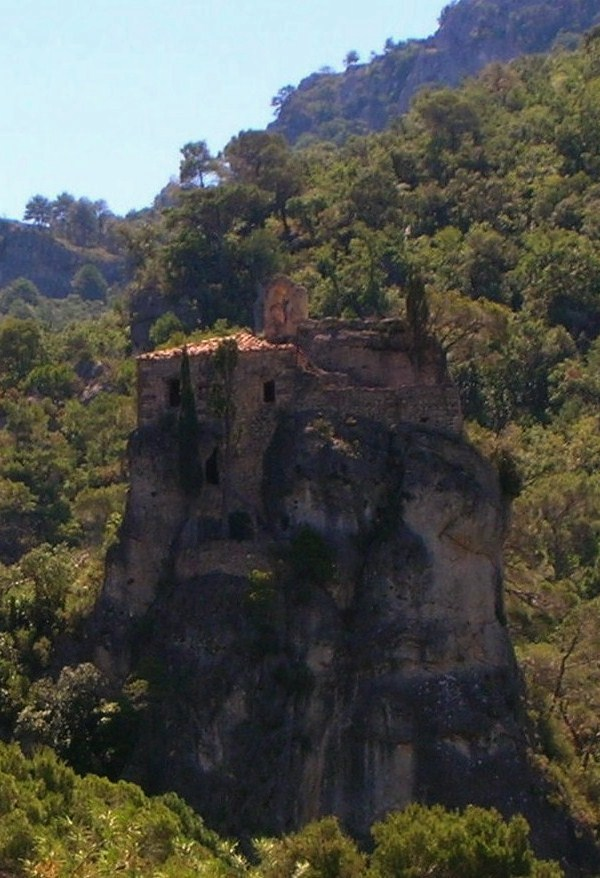
Ruined hermitage perched atop a rock needle in Vall de Cardó

The Cardó Monastery, also known as Sant Hilari de Cardó or Desert de Cardó, was a large monastery located in the Cardó Valley (Vall de Cardó), a deep valley in these mountains. It was closed down due to the Ecclesiastical Confiscations of Mendizábal in 1835 during Isabella II of Spain's rule. The Desamortización or secularization of the place brought monastic life in the monastery, and the many hermitages surrounding it, to an end. The monastery can be reached by a paved road from Rasquera.

In the late 19th century the monastery was transformed into a spa, which became a very successful place among the Catalan elite until the Spanish Civil War. By mid 20th century, only a water bottling plant was functional in the area.

Recently there was a project to transform the ruined former monastery and spa premises into a luxury resort, but the current financial crisis in Spain thwarted the plans. Access is not allowed to the grounds of the former spa, but abandoned construction equipment can be seen from a distance among the half-ruined buildings.

The small abandoned hermitages scattered about the area close to the former monastery, some of them perching atop karstic rock needles, are popular with hikers.

== See also ==
- Catalan Pre-Coastal Range
- Mountains of Catalonia
