= Creu de Santos =

- Xàquera
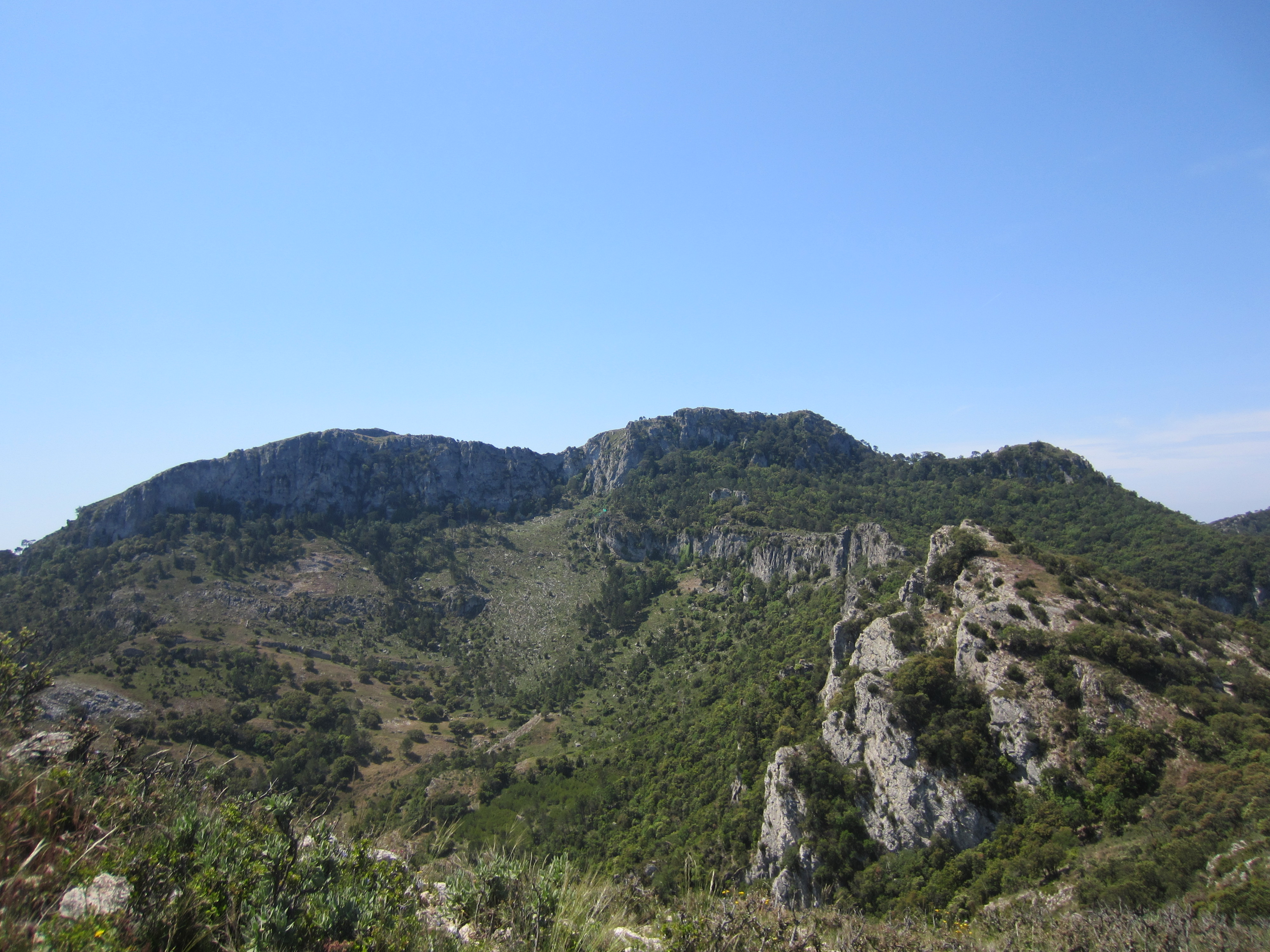
- View of the Creu de Santos (or Xàquera) summit

Highest point
- Elevation: 941 m (3,087 ft)
- Listing: Mountains in Catalonia
- Coordinates: 40°56′25.88″N 0°35′9.77″E

Geography
- Location within Province of Tarragona Location within Catalonia
- Location: Tivenys, Benifallet, and Rasquera, Catalonia, Spain
- Parent range: Serra de Cardó

Climbing
- Easiest route: Walk

Creu de Santos or Xàquera is the highest mountain of the Serra de Cardó range, Catalonia, Spain. The Serra de Cardó is part of the Massís de Cardó, Catalan Pre-Coastal Range. This mountain has an elevation of 941 metres above sea level.

== See also ==
- Cardó Massif
- Catalan Pre-Coastal Range
