= C-12 highway (Spain) =

Highway in Catalonia, Spain

Coordinates: 40°51′38″N 0°30′29″E

- Eix de l'Ebre

Major junctions
- From: Lleida
- To: Tortosa

Location
- Country: Spain

Highway system
- Highways in Spain; Autopistas and autovías; National Roads

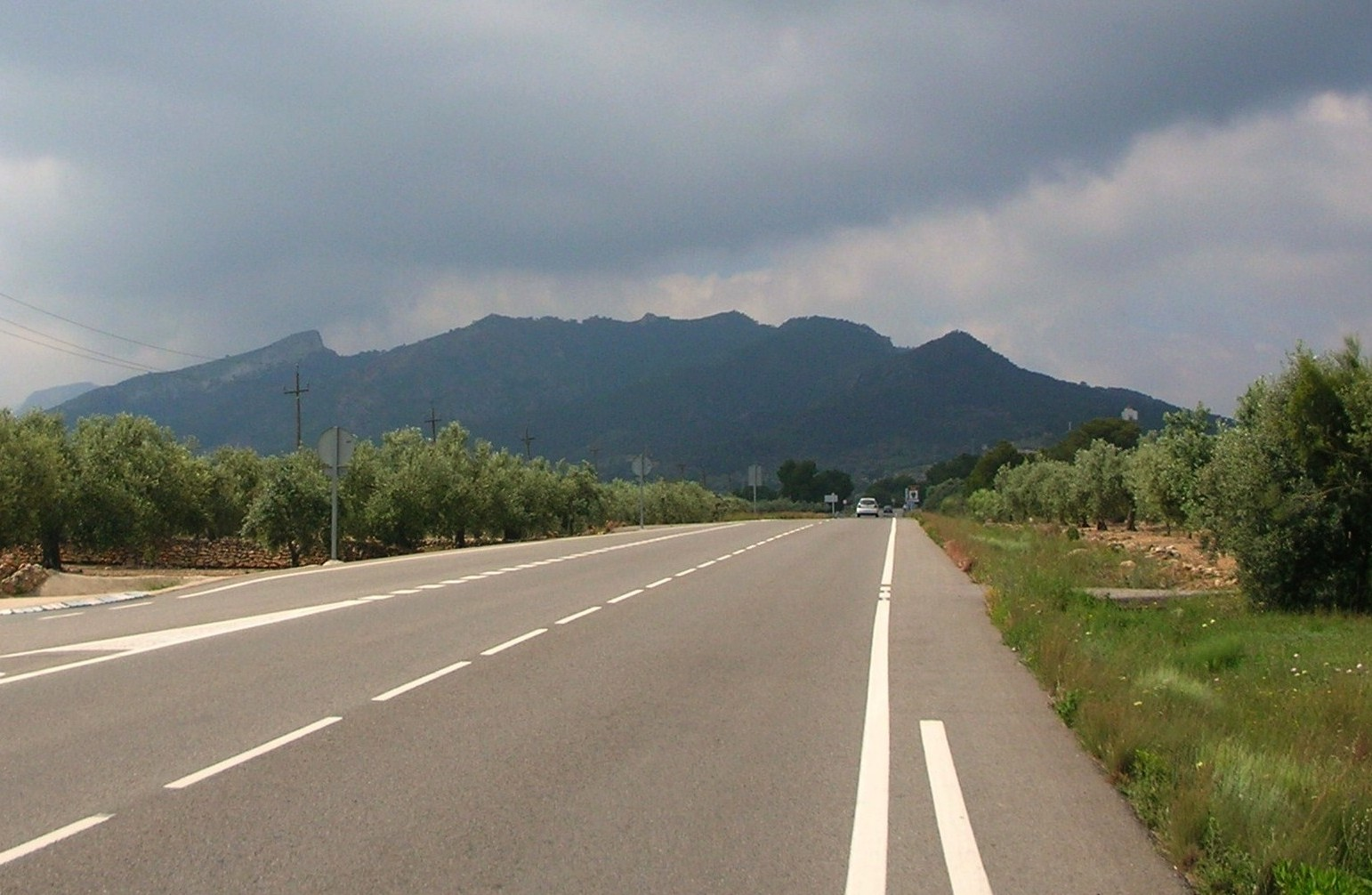
C-12 road near Rasquera with the Serra de Cardó in the background.

The C-12 is a highway in Catalonia, Spain, that connects Lleida with Tortosa and the Ebre river delta. For much of its length it runs along the lower Ebre valley. North of Lleida the road follows the Noguera valley before joining the C-13.

Autovia C-12 cuts across the westernmost end of the Cardó Massif, above the final Ebro Gorges. This highway is also known as the Eix de l'Ebre (Ebro Axis).

== See also ==
- Autovia C-13
