= Botanical garden Ecoherbes Park =

Park in Spain

Coordinates: 40.8124°N 0.6920°E

Ecoherbes Park
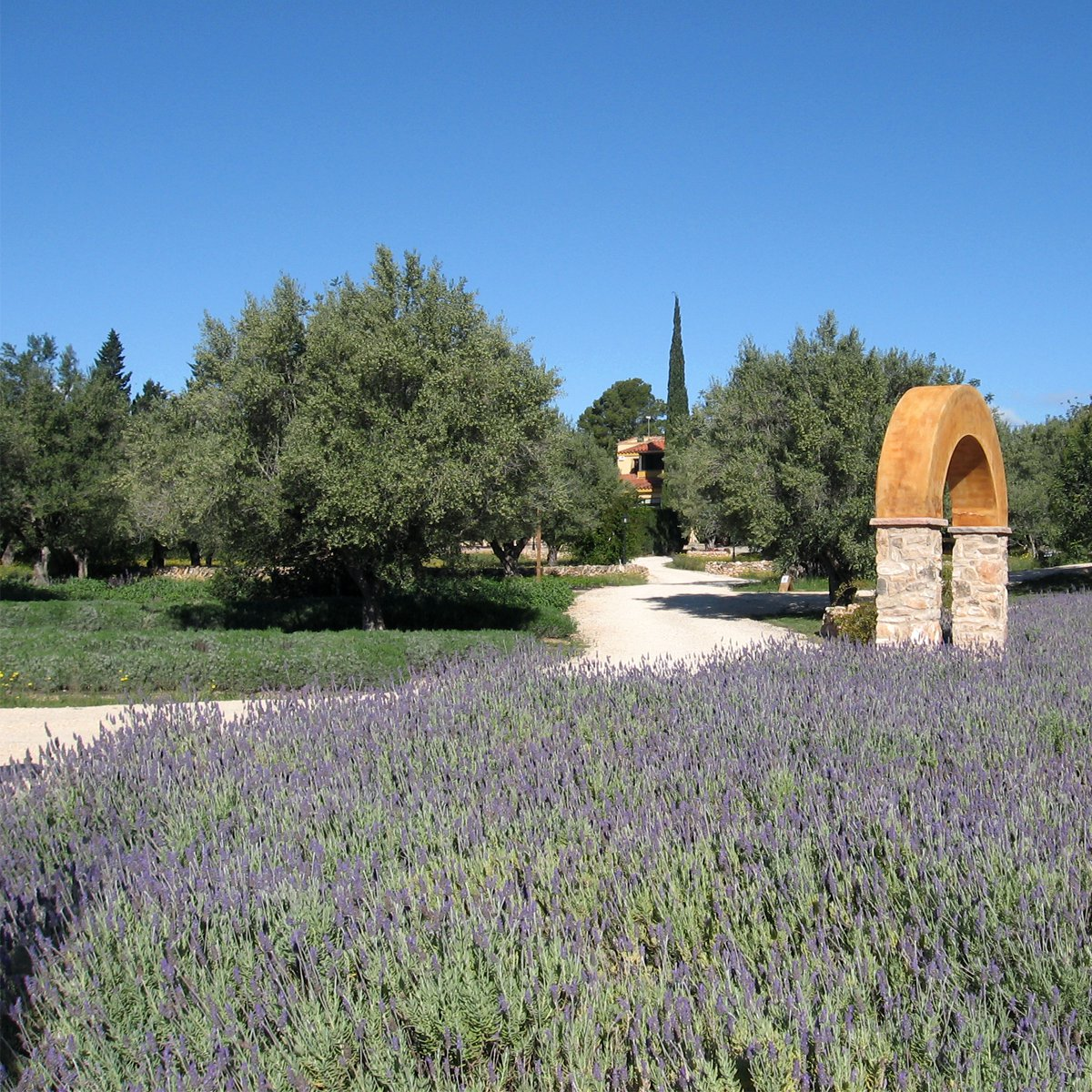

- Location within Spain
- Location: La ampolla, Tarragona - Catalonia, Spain Website

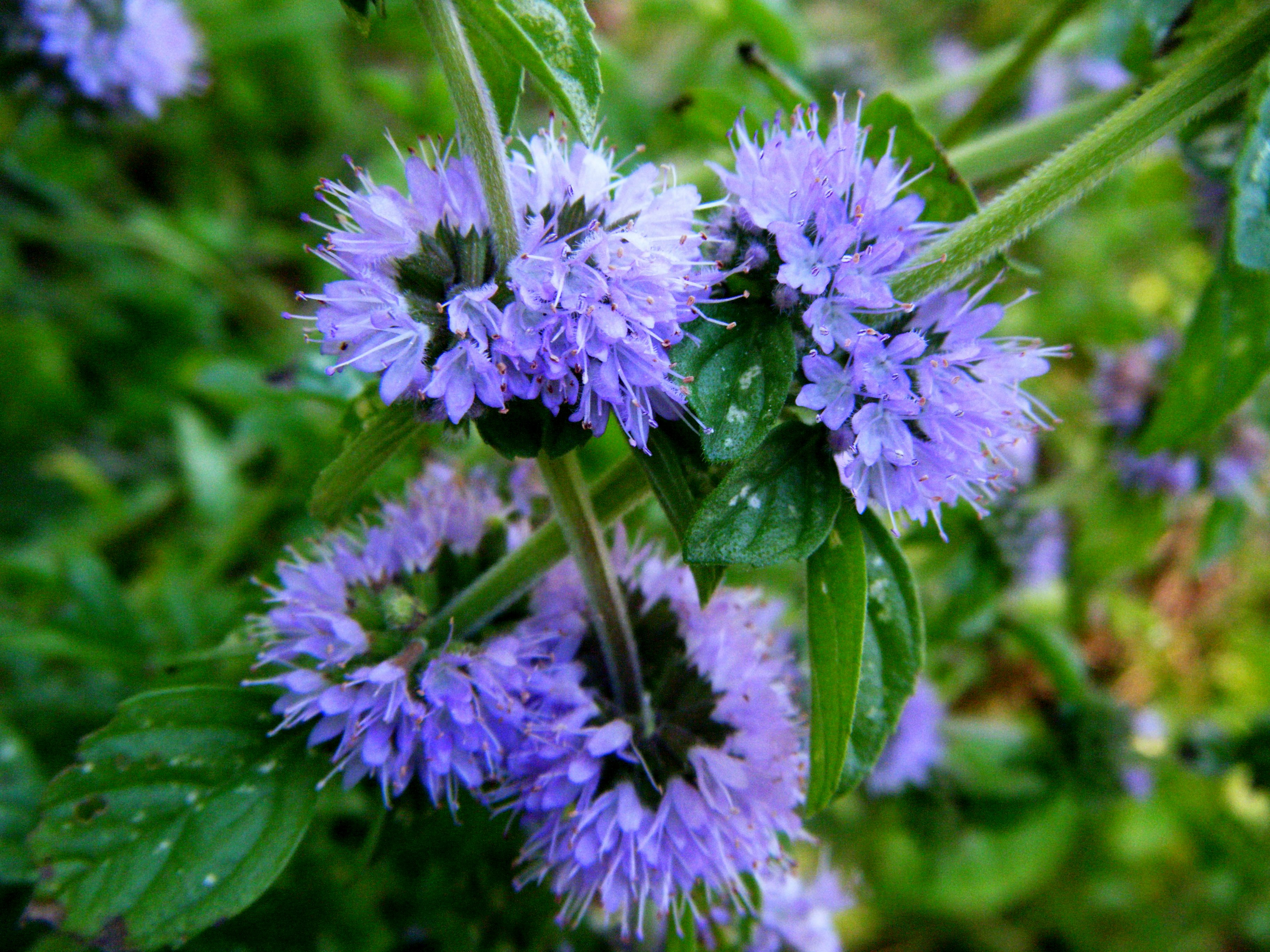
Mentha Pulegium Ecoherbes Park

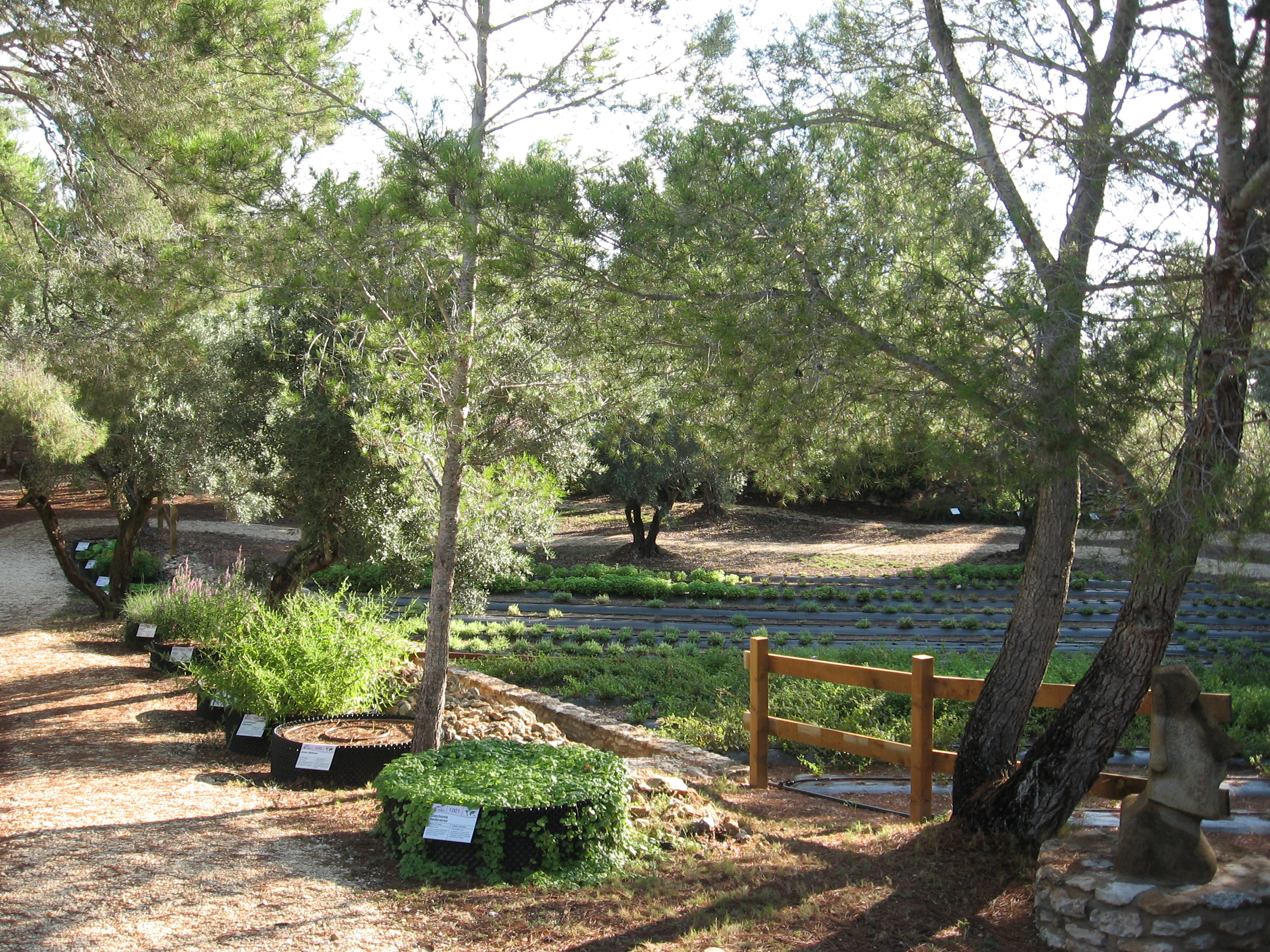
Ecoherbes Park

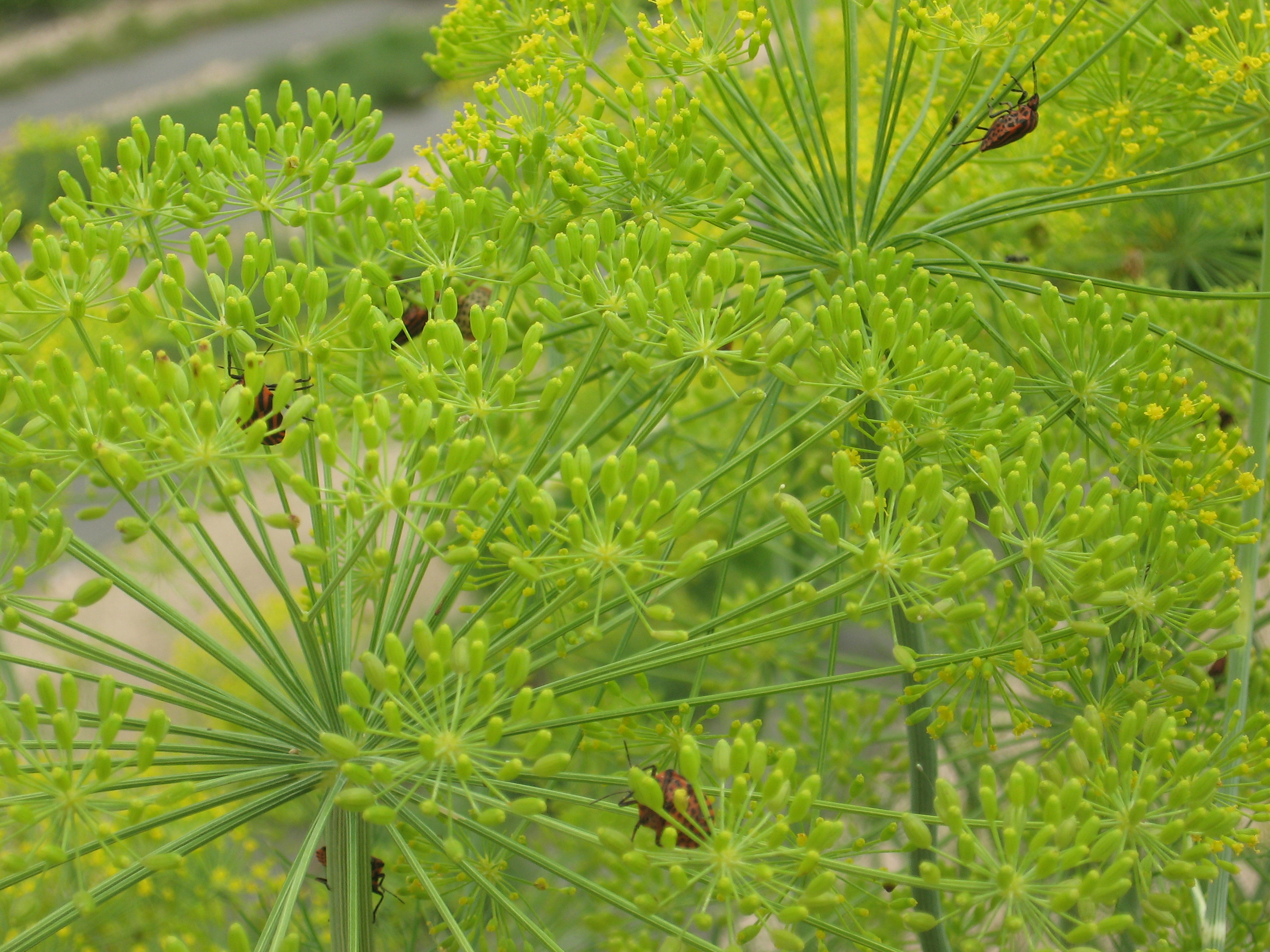
Foeniculum vulgare, Ecoherbes Park

Botanical Garden Ecoherbes Park is a botanical garden of medicinal plants located in the town of L'Ampolla known as "Porta del Delta de l'Ebre" because of its proximity to the Ebro Delta in the region of Baix Ebre, an area declared a biosphere reserve by UNESCO.

== History ==
The ecological medicinal Ecoherbes park was inaugurated on the 20th of June 2015 and opened its doors to the public on the 21st of June, at the summer solstice. It is a project that has been born and is being developed with the objective of providing, in situ, knowledge of the plants and their use in current medicine and traditions. Visitors can walk freely through the gardens or explore it with a guide.

== Collections ==
The garden houses more than 400 species of medicinal, aromatic and culinary plants from different parts of the world. Together with the plants, there is a large biodiversity of native trees and shrubs surrounded by a combination of farmlands and the Mediterranean and natural park of the Ebro Delta in the background. The 2 hectare botanic garden is situated in a 10 hectare archaeological park. In its construction, all the morphology of the land has remained, such as the centenary dry stone walls and many trees that are still alive, such as the Aleppo pine (Pinus halepensis), the olive tree (Olea europaea) some of which are thousands of years old and the carob tree (Ceratonia siliqua) that is over 300 years old. The garden is structured by paths that provide many routes and where the plants are distributed micro-climatologically, taking into account the exposure to the sun, wind and humidity.

The flower beds facilitate drainage and soil aeration, leading to an optimum structure for the root system of the plants. All the different species are planted individually in their own flower beds, making is easier to adjust the substrate and to attend to the plant with any specific needs. Each plant has a placard explaining the properties of each species, what it is used for, its common and scientific name and where is originates from.

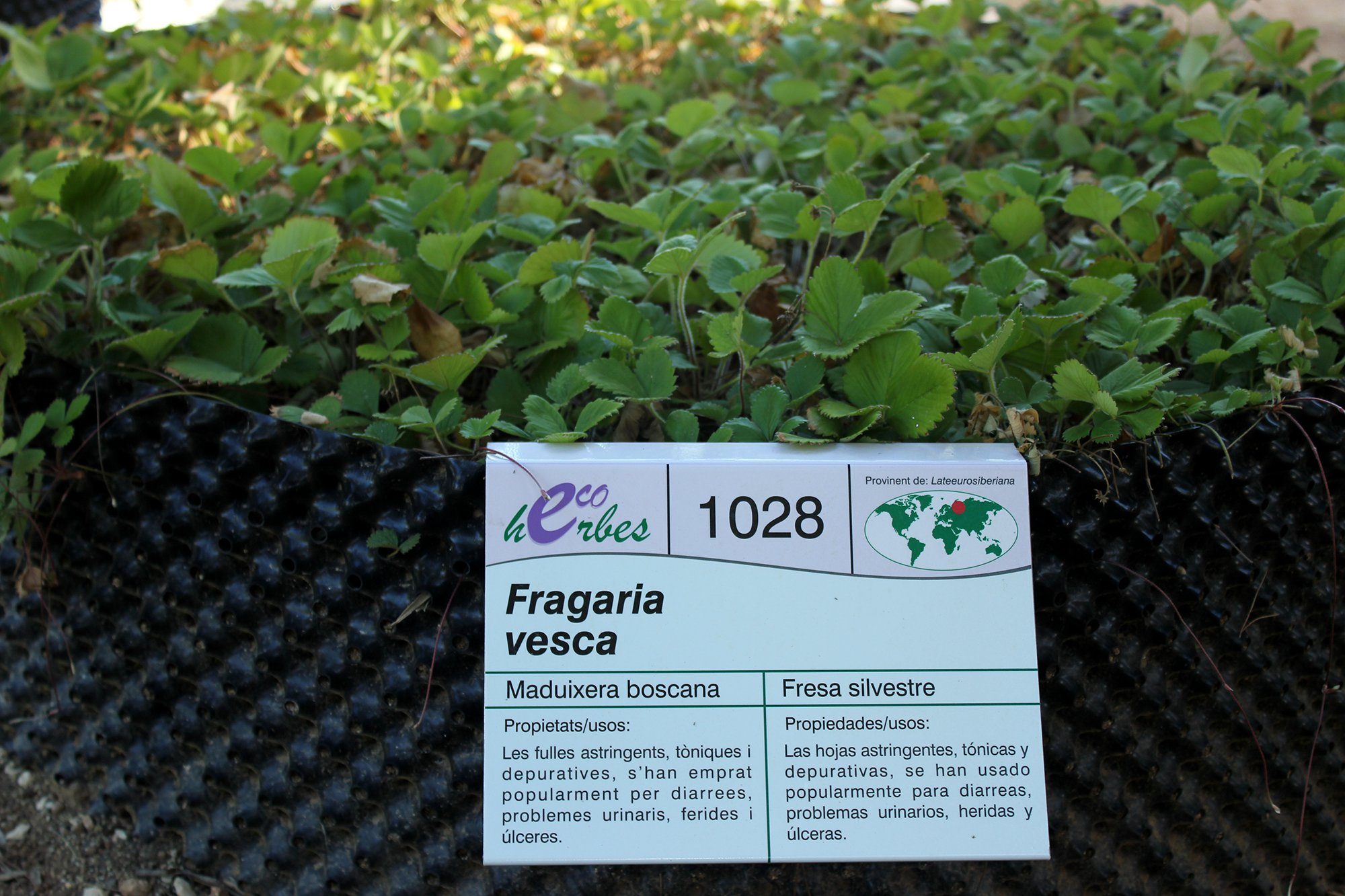
Plants Ecoherbes Park

The garden has the following collections: Rosmarinus, Thymus, Salvia, Menta, Albahaca, Artemisa, Echinacea, Geranium, Tanacetum, Achillea, Kalanchoe, Origanum, Cymbopogon, Plectranthus, Satureja, Leonorus, Lavandula and other medicinal plants from different continents. Within the enclosure, forming part of the garden, is the so-called Witches' Corner, where highly toxic, poisonous and psychotropic plants are located. This area is restricted for underage visitors. The garden is also a reservation area for species that are in danger of extinction. There is a seed bank or gymnosperm which has its own reproduction nursery where many of the species are experimented on for climate adaption.
