= C13 =

C13 or C-13 may refer to:

== Science and technology ==
- IEC 60320 C13, a polarised, three pole plug used in electric power cables
- Caterpillar C13 Engine, an engine by Caterpillar Inc.
- Caldwell 13 (NGC 457, the Owl Cluster or ET Cluster), an open star cluster in the constellation Cassiopeia
- Carbon-13 (^{13}C), a natural stable isotope of carbon
- Malignant neoplasm of hypopharynx (ICD-10 code), a head and neck cancer
- Tridecylic acid, a saturated fatty acid

== Military and transportation ==
- C13 grenade, the Canadian Forces designation for a M67 grenade
- Autovia C-13, a highway in Catalonia, Spain
- HMS C13, a 1906 British C-class submarine
- LNER Class C13, a steam locomotive class

== Other uses ==
- Sauber C13, a 1994 racing car
- 13th century
- C13, in music, a chord with the structure 1 - 3 - 5 - b7 - 9 - 13
- French Defence (Encyclopaedia of Chess Openings code)
- C13 White Lead (Painting) Convention, 1921, an International Labour Organization Convention
