= Buinaca =

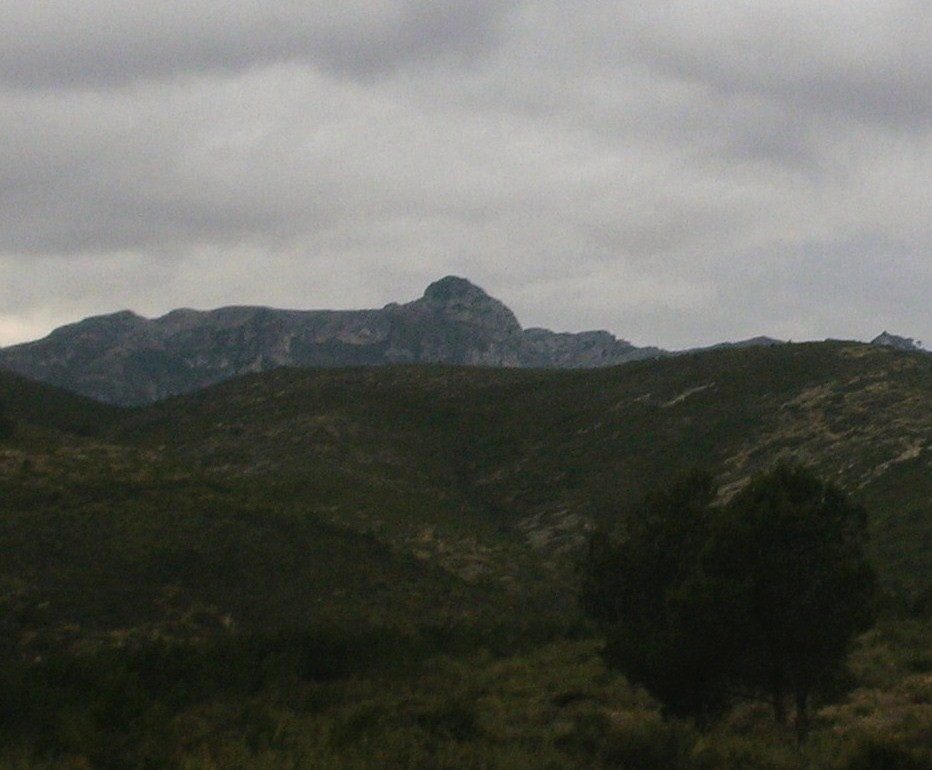
- Buinaca seen from the northeast

Highest point
- Elevation: 764.6 m (2,509 ft)
- Coordinates: 40°52′58″N 0°37′11″E

Geography
- Location within Province of Tarragona Location within Catalonia Location within Spain
- Location: Tortosa (Baix Ebre), Catalonia, Spain
- Parent range: Serra del Boix

Geology
- Mountain type: Calcareous

Climbing
- First ascent: Unknown
- Easiest route: From El Perelló

Buinaca or Punta de la Buinaca, also spelt Boinaca, is one of the highest mountains of the Cardó Massif, Catalan Pre-Coastal Range, Catalonia, Spain. This mountain has an elevation of 764 metres above sea level.

It is the highest peak of the Serra del Boix range and it is located at the southern end of the range in an area of massive rocky outcrops known as "Les Moles". There are many wind turbines atop the smoother neighboring ridges.

== See also ==
- Cardó Massif
- Catalan Pre-Coastal Range
- Mountains of Catalonia
