= Morral de Cabrafeixet =

Mountain in Spain

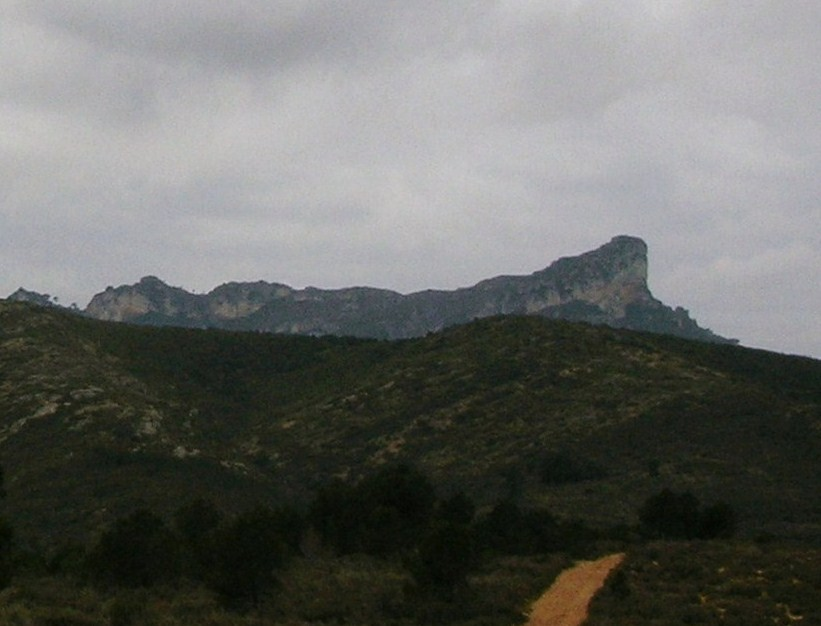
- Morral de Cabrafeixet seen from the northeast

Highest point
- Elevation: 753.5 m (2,472 ft)
- Coordinates: 40°53′47.4″N 00°37′16.4″E

Geography
- Location within Catalonia
- Location: El Perelló (Baix Ebre), Catalonia
- Parent range: "Les Moles", wider Serra del Boix range

Geology
- Mountain type: Calcareous

Climbing
- First ascent: Unknown
- Easiest route: From El Perelló

Morral de Cabrafeixet is one of the highest mountains of the Cardó Massif, Catalan Pre-Coastal Range, Catalonia, Spain. Its NW side has an impressive escarpment visible from Highway N-340 approaching El Perelló from the north. This mountain has an elevation of 753 metres above sea level.

Balma de Cabrafeixet is a prehistoric site with cave paintings located right below the Morral de Cabrafeixet escarpment. The entrance to the cave has been closed with an iron bar door to prevent vandalism. Wild flowers and butterflies are abundant in this lonely, uninhabited area.

== See also ==
- Cardó Massif
- Catalan Pre-Coastal Range
- Mountains of Catalonia
