= El Perelló =

- Municipality
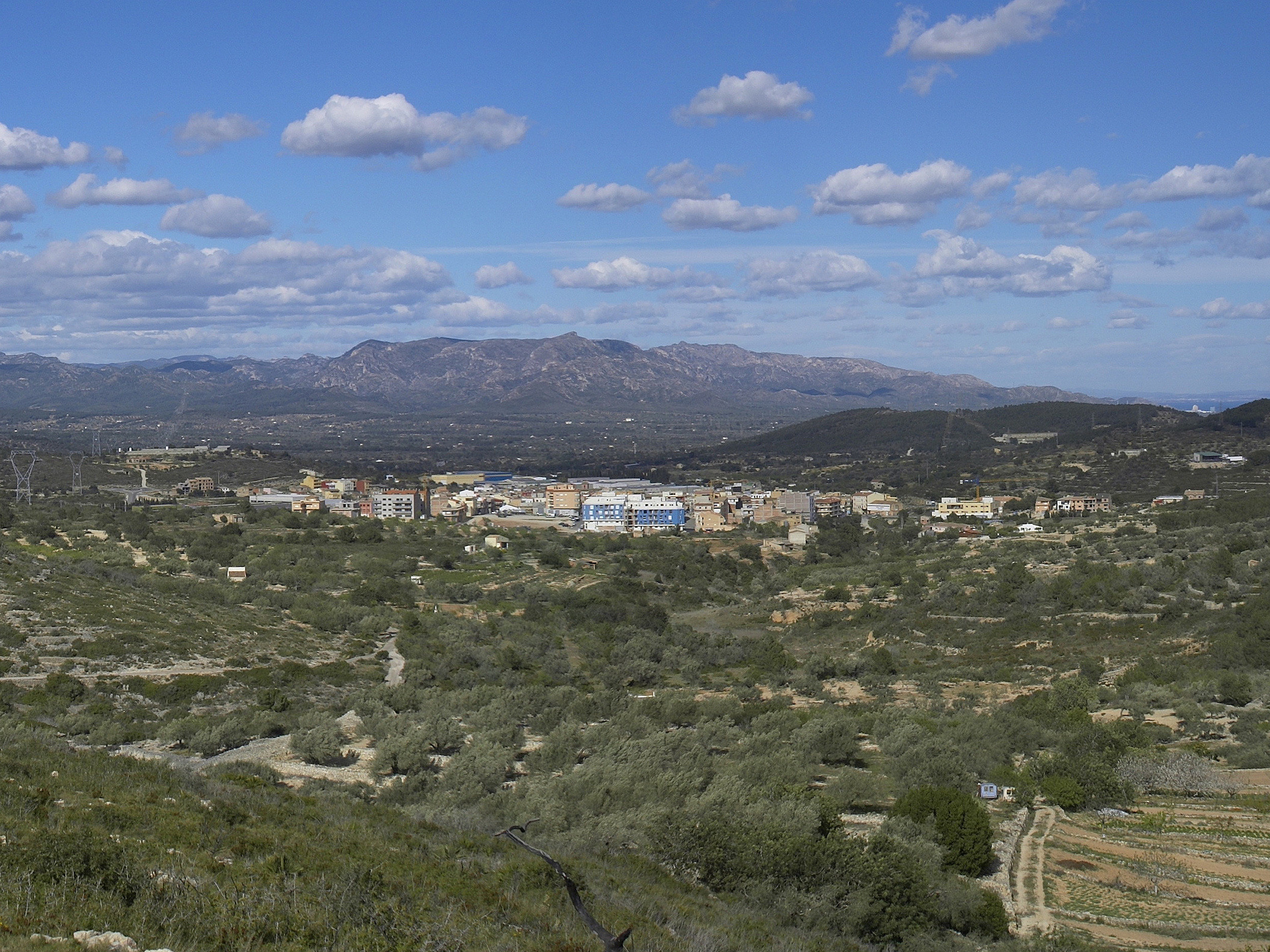
- El Perelló with the Serra del Boix in the background

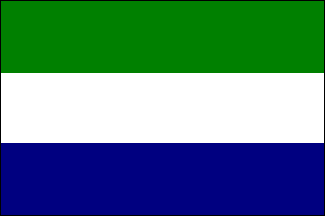
- Flag Coat of arms

- Location in Catalonia
- Coordinates: 40°52′36″N 0°42′47″E
- Country: Spain
- Community: Catalonia
- Province: Tarragona
- Comarca: Baix Ebre

Government
  - Mayor: Maria Cinta Llaó i Llaó (2019)

Area
  - Total: 100.7 km^{2} (38.9 sq mi)
- Elevation: 142 m (466 ft)

Population (2025-01-01)
  - Total: 3,005
  - Density: 29.84/km^{2} (77.29/sq mi)
- Demonym(s): Perellonenc, perellonenca
- Website: www.elperello.cat

El Perelló (Catalan pronunciation: [el peɾeˈʎo]) is a municipality in the comarca of the Baix Ebre in Catalonia, Spain.

It is situated in the north of the comarca, below the Boix and Cabrafeixet ranges. The N-340 road runs around the town, and connects it with the A-7 autopista at l'Ampolla.

== Demography ==
The municipality of l'Ampolla formed part of El Perelló until 1990; their combined population is 3,005 (Statistical Institute of Catalonia, 2025). Population figures below are for the territory of El Perelló as of the date given.

| 1900 | 1930 | 1950 | 1970 | 1986 | 2007 |
|---|---|---|---|---|---|
| 4134 | 4408 | 4149 | 3556 | 3713 | 2895 |

== Bibliography ==
- Panareda Clopés, Josep Maria; Rios Calvet, Jaume; Rabella Vives, Josep Maria (1989). Guia de Catalunya, Barcelona: Caixa de Catalunya. ISBN 84-87135-01-3 (Spanish). ISBN 84-87135-02-1 (Catalan).
