= L'Ametlla de Mar =

- Municipality
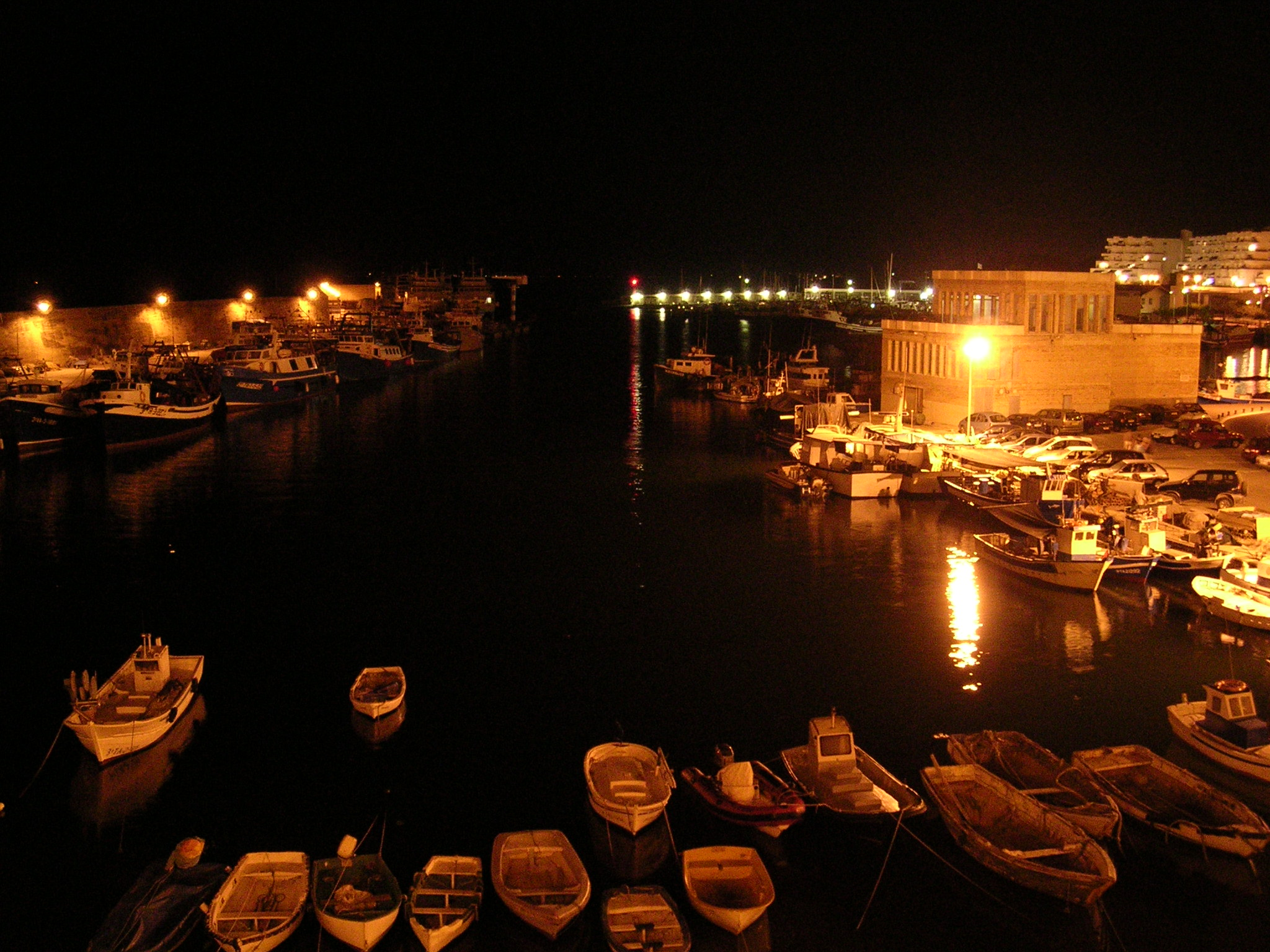
- Ametlla de Mar harbour at night

- Flag Coat of arms

- Location in Catalonia
- Coordinates: 40°53′10″N 0°48′13″E
- Country: Spain
- Community: Catalonia
- Province: Tarragona
- Comarca: Baix Ebre

Government
  - Mayor: Jordi Gaseni Blanch (2015)

Area
  - Total: 66.9 km^{2} (25.8 sq mi)
- Elevation: 19 m (62 ft)

Population (2025-01-01)
  - Total: 7,446
  - Density: 111/km^{2} (288/sq mi)
- Demonyms: Calero, calera
- Website: ametllamar.cat

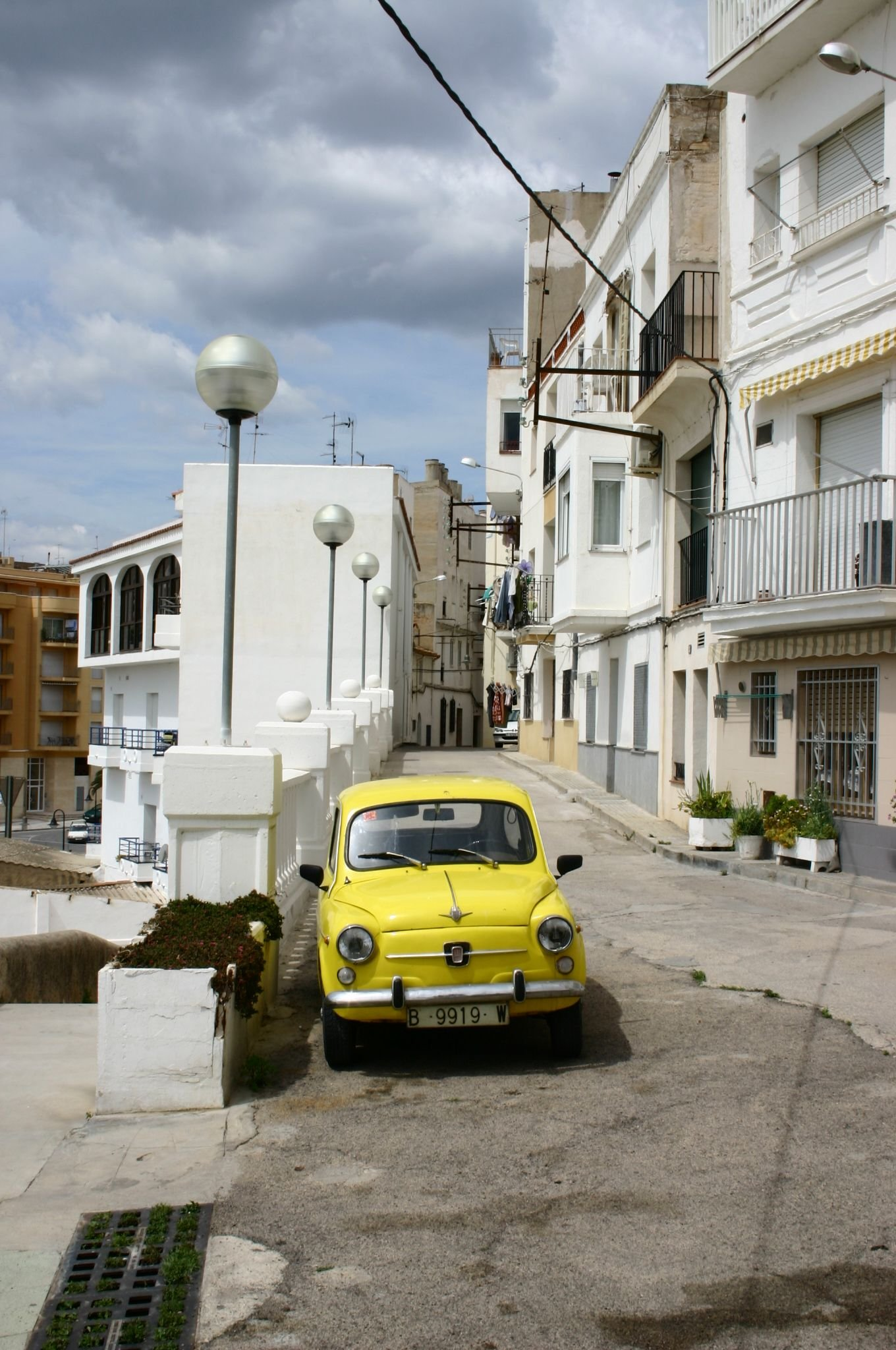
Carrer del Sol

L'Ametlla de Mar (Catalan pronunciation: [laˈmeʎʎa ðe ˈmaɾ]), also called la Cala ('the bay' or 'the beach'), is a municipality within the comarca of Baix Ebre, situated in the coastal region between the "Cap de Terme" (to the North) and the "barranc de l'Àliga" (to the south). It is limited to the south by the boundary with El Perelló, to the north-west with that of Tivissa, the Ebro riviera, and to the north-east with that of Vandellós and l'Hospitalet de l'Infant (Baix Camp).

Fishing continues to be one of the principal activities of the town. The port area of Ametlla has a large fleet of fishing boats which fish using various methods, such as trawling, and also has the principal fleet of tuna fishing boats in Catalonia. The port has a sailing club with 225 berths.

There are several large housing estates within the boundaries of L’Ametlla de Mar: Calafat, Sant Jordi d'Alfama, les Tres Cales and Roques Daurades. The beaches are either of fine, white sand or smooth pebbles.

== Events ==
There is a museum of traditional pottery in Sant Jordi housing estate which is about 5 km from the town centre. It opened on 5 May 2001, but it dates from 1992 when the Martí-Castro private foundationwas established. L'Ametlla de Mar council has been involved in its management since 2000. The main Festival in L’Ametlla de Mar is on the second of February, which celebrates the Mare de Deu de la Candelera, our Lady of Candlemas who is the Patron Saint of the town. Different activities take place during the Festival; the most important being a religious candle-lit procession of our Lady. There is also street music, "capgrossos", concerts, dances.... etc. Saint Peter's day, the Patron Saint of the fishermen is on 29 June when there is a maritime procession. Corpus Christi is on 29 May. This is when the streets are decorated. The people of L’Ametlla stay up all night to decorate the streets with flowers and leaves to celebrate this festival. Last but not least, Saint George's day (The Patron Saint of Catalonia) is also celebrated at the Castell de Sant Jordi.

== Transport ==
L’Ametlla is well communicated and served by the AP 7 (exit 39) motorway, the N-340 main road and the main line Barcelona – Valencia or Barcelona – Tortosa regional train.

The train can be caught from the Estació de França, near the "Born" district of Barcelona, the Passeig de Gracia or Sants station.

== Tourism ==
The modern Tourist Information Office (recognised as a 1st class office by the Catalan Government), located at the entrance of the town, offers both tourist information and customer care services.

=== The coast ===
L’Ametlla de Mar's coastline is 16 km long and is made up of 30 bays and beaches. Some of the beaches have fine, white sand whilst others are pebbly. They are surrounded by pine trees and have crystal-clear water due to the abundance of Posidonia found here. L’Ametlla de Mar, which has been awarded 5 blue flags for its beaches and one for the Marina, is the second municipality in Catalonia to have been awarded so many flags. Nudists can go to the "Torrent del Pi" bay and those who like going to the beach with their pets can go to the "Bon Caponet" bay. Some of the beaches are accessible to people with disabilities.

=== Active tourism ===
A group of companies, "AmetlladeMar Experience" offer a wide variety of activities related to both the Mediterranean Sea and its natural environment. These include diving, snorkelling, cycling, touristic cruises, kayaking, boat rental, tuna-tour, fishing, rambling, and motorcycle racing at the racing track in Calafat. A Sports Destination Tourist Certificate has been awarded to l’Ametlla de Mar by the Catalan Tourist Agency. L’Ametlla de Mar also forms part of the Nautical Station of the Costa Daurada.

The GR 92 long distance footpath, which roughly follows the length of the Mediterranean coast of Spain, has a staging point at L'Ametlla de Mar. Stage 28 links northwards to L'Hospitalet de l'Infant, a distance of 22.8 kilometres (14.2 mi), whilst stage 29 links southwards to L'Ampolla a distance of 15.3 kilometres (9.5 mi).

=== Gastronomy ===
One of the things that gives l’Ametlla de Mar its stamp of identity is its seafood cuisine. A lot of restaurants serve typical, regional dishes made with the fish and shellfish caught by the local fishing fleet. The catch is auctioned in the fishermen's co-operative every afternoon. Gastronomic days to promote these top-class, local products (galeras "a type of shrimp"), red tuna, oily fish, locally-caught fish, fideos "rossejats" (a local dish of noodles cooked in fish broth) and "l’Arrossejat" (a local rice dish) are held throughout the year.

=== Profile of tourists ===
Data from summer 2016

From	%
Catalonia	30
Rest of Spain	29
France	28
UK	7
Benelux	4.5
Germany	4
Others	2

Ages	%
36 to 65 years old	48
26 to 35 years old	36
older than 65	11
16 to 25 years old	5

Accommodation	%
Self-catering apartments	31
campsites	29
hotel	19
hostel	14
country houses	3
caravan	2
with friends or relatives	2

Reasons given for choosing l’Ametlla de Mar as a holiday resort:

- Its beaches
- Nature
- Active tourism
- The food
- The climate
- The typical seafaring environment
