= Benifallet =

- Municipality
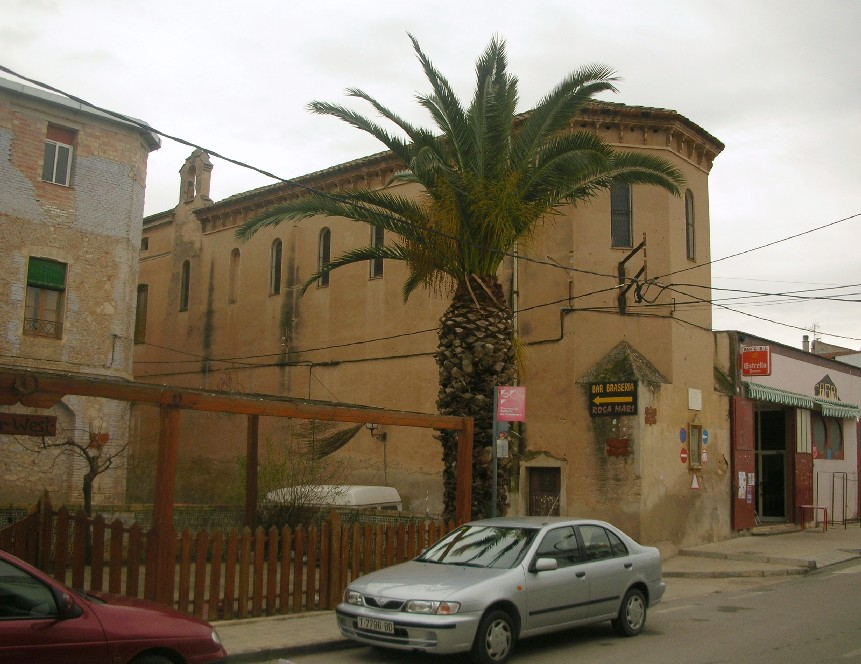
- Benifallet centre

- Coat of arms

- Location in Catalonia Benifallet (Catalonia) Benifallet (Spain)
- Coordinates: 40°58′30″N 0°31′0″E
- Country: Spain
- Autonomous Community: Catalonia
- Province: Tarragona
- Comarca: Baix Ebre

Government
  - Mayor: Maria Mercè Pedret Ramos (2015)

Area
  - Total: 62.4 km^{2} (24.1 sq mi)
- Elevation: 19 m (62 ft)

Population (2025-01-01)
  - Total: 706
  - Density: 11.3/km^{2} (29.3/sq mi)
- Postal code: 43512
- Website: www.benifallet.altanet.org

Benifallet (Catalan pronunciation: [benifaˈʎet]) is a municipality in the comarca of Baix Ebre, in the province of Tarragona, in Catalonia, Spain.

It has a population of 706 (register office, 2025).

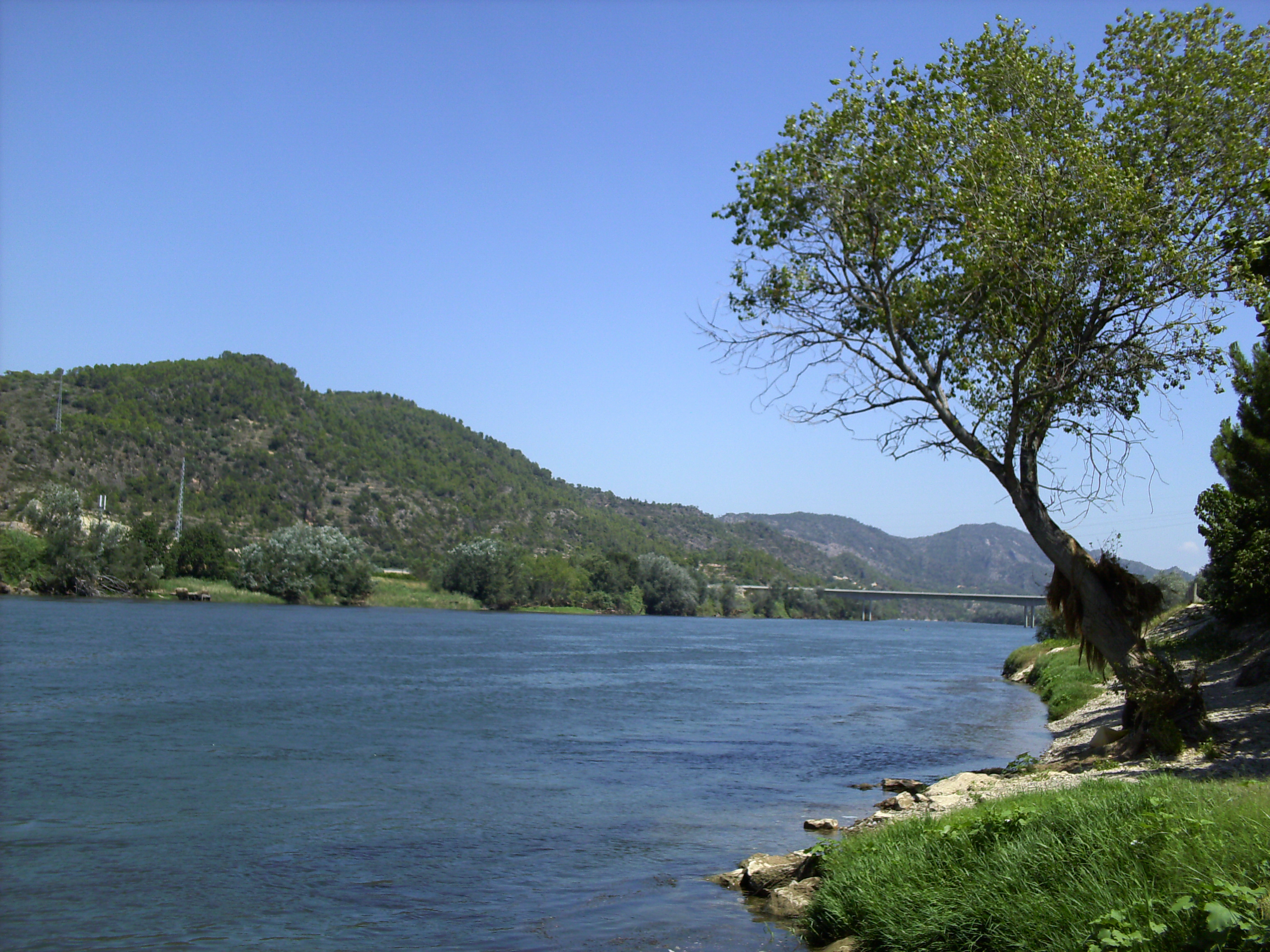
The Ebre River near Benifallet

This town is located by the Ebro River, below the Cardó Massif. It is popular among kayakers who make trips down the final Ebro Gorges.

There are also locally arranged trips on rafts and kayaks down the Ebro Gorges.
