= C-13 highway (Spain) =

Highway in Catalonia, Spain

C-13

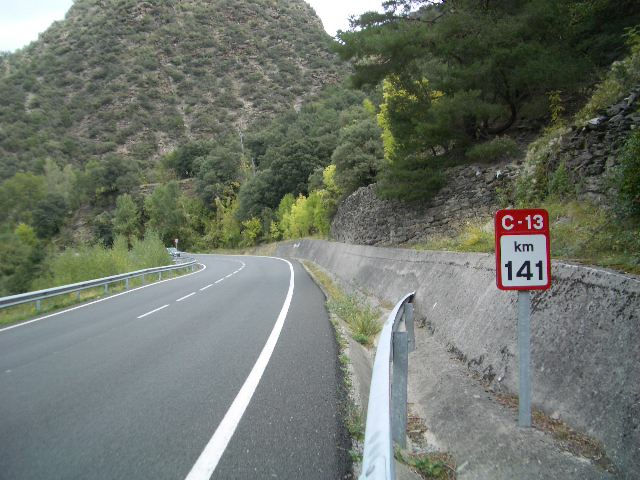
- The C-13 at Llavorsi

Major junctions
- From: Lleida
- To: Esterri d'Àneu

Location
- Country: Spain

Highway system
- Highways in Spain; Autopistas and autovías; National Roads

The C-13, also known as Eix del Pallars (Pallars Axis), is a highway through the Pyrenees in Catalonia, Spain.

== Route ==
The road connects the regional capital Lleida with Balaguer and the eastern Noguera Pallaresa river valley north of Tremp. It shares its route with part of the N-260, an east–west route across the Pyrenees, and follows the route of the Lleida–La Pobla Line to La Pobla de Segur.

== History ==
The bypass of Vilanova de la Barca opened in April 2014, allowing traffic from Lleida and Balaguer to avoid the town. This included a 430-metre viaduct over the River Corb, containing 11 separate sections of 30–45 metres each. The total cost was €49 million, and is part of an overall project to improve transport between Lleida and Balaguer.

On 1 April 2018, following the 2017 Catalan independence referendum, a section of the road at Térmens was temporarily occupied by protests from the Committees for the Defense of the Republic who objected to paying road tolls in Catalonia to the Spanish government. The protestors occupied toll booths and dismantled the barriers, allowing drivers to travel without paying.

In December 2019, a section of highway was closed after a rockfall at Llavorsí blocked the road. Removal of debris took two days. The closure affected skiing holidaymakers heading to resorts such as Espot Esquí, who were stuck for several hours. Numerous bookings at resorts were cancelled, according to the president of the Federación de Hostelería de Lleida.

The road's speed limit along the section from Lleida to Esterri d'Aneu was reduced in 2019 to 90 km/h as part of a policy change on roads across Catalonia to improve the safety of single-carriageway roads with a curb under 1½ meters.

== See also ==
- Autovia C-12
