= Rasquera =

- Municipality
- Coat of arms

- Location in Catalonia
- Coordinates: 41°00′14″N 0°35′58″E
- Country: Spain
- Community: Catalonia
- Province: Tarragona
- Comarca: Ribera d'Ebre

Government
  - Mayor: Josep Ramos Múrria (2019)

Area
  - Total: 51.3 km^{2} (19.8 sq mi)
- Elevation: 174 m (571 ft)

Population (2025-01-01)
  - Total: 786
  - Density: 15.3/km^{2} (39.7/sq mi)
- Demonym(s): Rasquerà, rasquerana
- Website: rasquera.cat

Rasquera (Catalan pronunciation: [rasˈkeɾa]) is a municipality in the comarca of Ribera d'Ebre in the province of Tarragona in Catalonia, Spain. It has a population of 786 (register office, 2025).

It is located at the feet of the Serra de Cardó close to Highway C-12.

The town is renowned for its basketwork and the production of "pastissets" a sweet pasty.

In 2012 the municipality voted to sign a 1.3 million euro deal with a cannabis association based in Barcelona, under which the municipality would lease land to the association to be used for growing the drug.

== Bibliography ==
- Panareda Clopés, Josep Maria; Rios Calvet, Jaume; Rabella Vives, Josep Maria (1989). Guia de Catalunya, Barcelona: Caixa de Catalunya. ISBN 84-87135-01-3 (Spanish). ISBN 84-87135-02-1 (Catalan).
