= Tortosa =

- Municipality
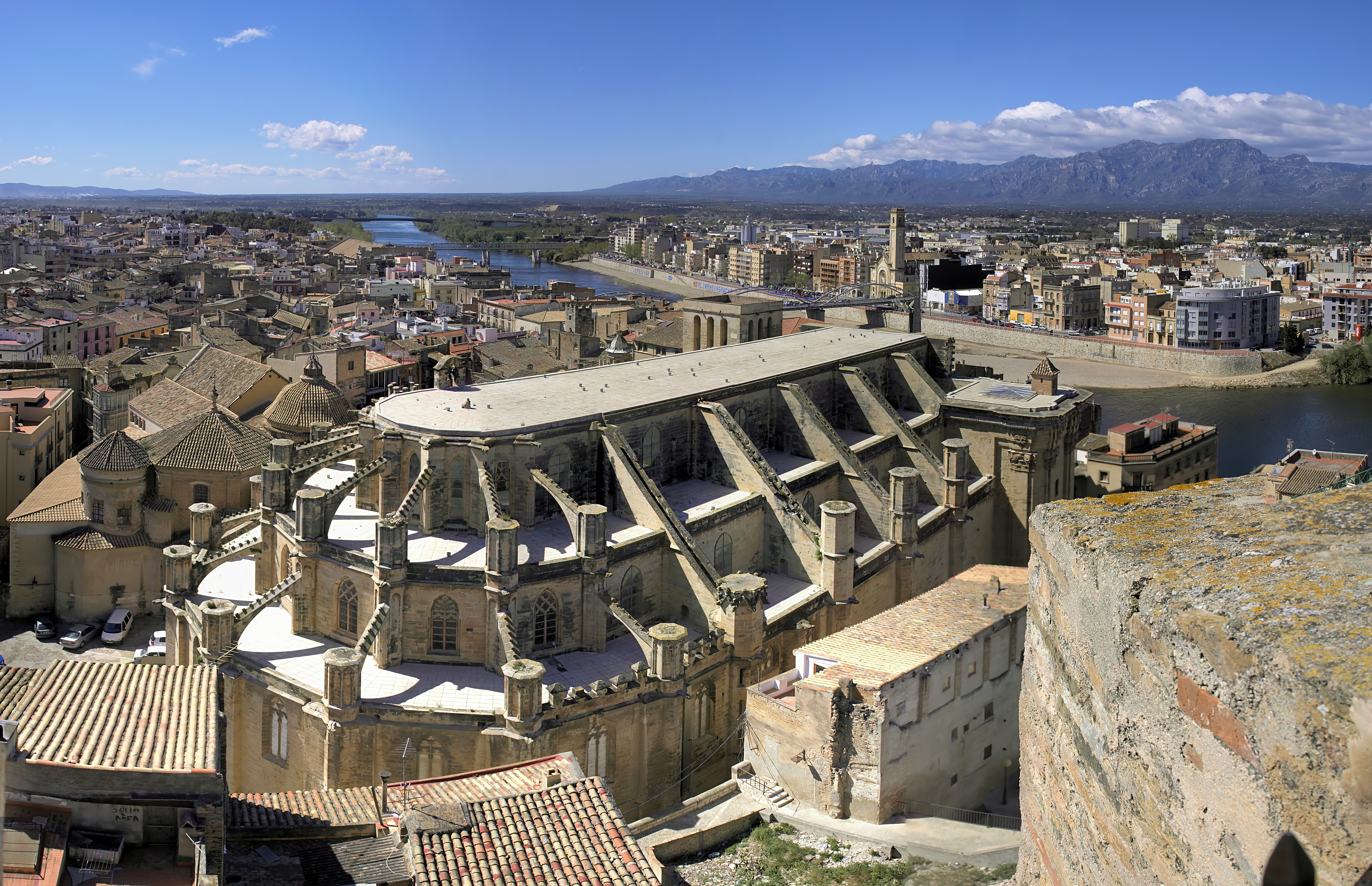

- Flag Coat of arms

- Location in Catalonia
- Coordinates: 40°48′46″N 0°31′24″E
- Country: Spain
- Community: Catalonia
- Province: Tarragona
- Comarca: Baix Ebre

Government
  - Mayor: M. del Mar Lleixà Fortuño (2026)

Area
  - Total: 218.5 km^{2} (84.4 sq mi)
- Elevation: 12 m (39 ft)

Population (2025-01-01)
  - Total: 35,997
  - Density: 164.7/km^{2} (426.7/sq mi)
- Demonym(s): Tortosí, tortosina
- Climate: Csa
- Website: tortosa.cat

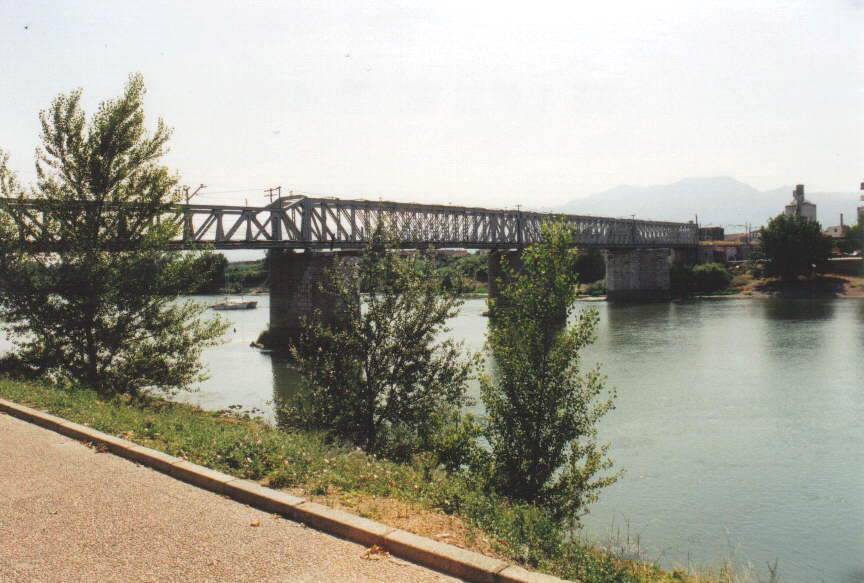
Ebro river in Tortosa

Tortosa (Catalan: [tuɾˈtozə], locally [toɾˈtoza]; Spanish: [toɾˈtosa]) is the capital of the comarca of Baix Ebre, in Catalonia, Spain.

Tortosa is located at 12 metres (39 feet) above sea level, by the Ebro river, protected on its northern side by the mountains of the Cardó Massif, of which Buinaca, one of the highest peaks, is located within Tortosa's municipal boundary. It is on the southern end of the Costa Daurada.

Before Tortosa, across the river, rise the massive Ports de Tortosa-Beseit mountains. The area around Mont Caro and other high summits are often covered with snow in the winter.

== Population centres ==
It has a population of 35,997 (register office, 2025), distributed in the following way:

- Bítem, 1.139; includes Santa Rosa
- Campredó, 1.168;
- Jesús, 3.755
- Els Reguers, 679
- Tortosa, 27.131
- Vinallop, 363, includes Mianes

The municipality includes a small exclave to the west.

== History ==
Tortosa (from Latin: Dertusa or Dertosa, via Arabic: طُرْطُوشَة Ṭurṭūshah) is probably identical to the ancient Hibera, capital of Ilercavonia. This may be the ancient settlement the remains of which have been found on the hill named Castillo de la Zuda. In Roman times, the town took the name Dertosa (Ancient Greek: Δέρτωσσα) and was on the Via Augusta Roman road.

Tortosa was occupied in about 714, during the Arab conquest of the Visigothic Kingdom. It remained under Muslim rule for more than 400 years. King Louis the Pious laid siege to Tortosa in 808–809, but although the city submitted he did not manage to occupy it.

The city was conquered by the Count Ramon Berenguer IV of Barcelona in 1148, as part of the Second Crusade. Because of the crusading appeal made by Pope Eugene III and his representative Nicholas Brakespear (the future Pope Hadrian IV), the siege received the aid of crusaders from multiple nationalities (Genovese, Anglo-Normans, Normans, Occitans, Germans, Flemish and Dutch), who were on their way to the Holy Land. The siege of Tortosa was narrated by the Genovese chronicler and diplomat Caffaro.

After its conquest, the city and its territory were divided among the victors, with multiple lands being granted to foreign crusaders and to the military and religious orders.

Tortosa also had a sizable Jewish community in the 14th and 15th centuries; vestiges of that community can be seen throughout the City.

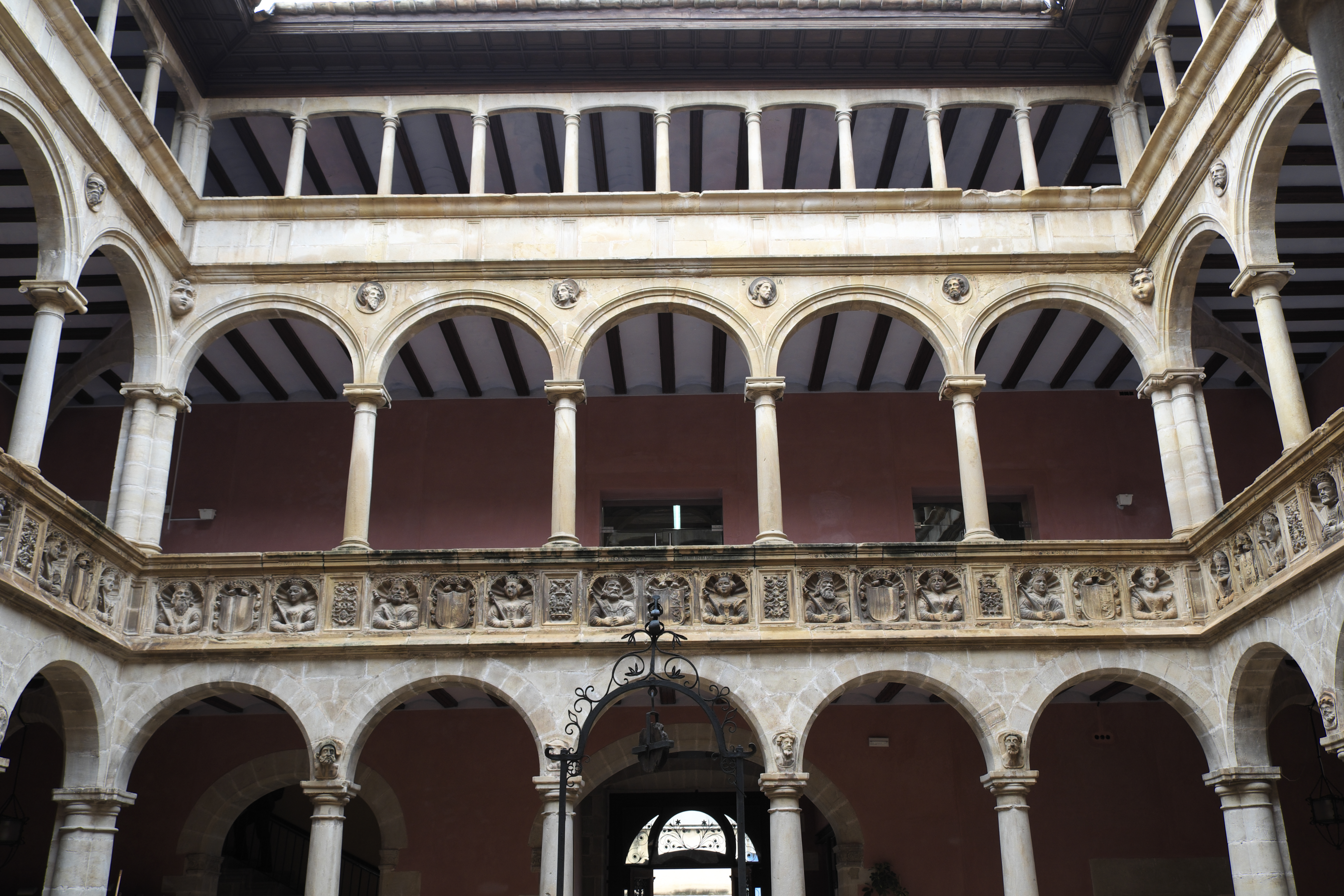
The Royal Schools.

In the years 1413 and 1414, as an attempt to force conversion upon the Jews, Jews were forced to defend their religion in a two-week Disputation of Tortosa which took place in the Cathedral of Tortosa, which is still standing today.

Construction work on a railway line between Tortosa and Alcañiz began in 1891, to open a communication gate between this region and Aragon. The work, however, was haphazard and the first trains between Alcañiz and Tortosa began only in 1942. The last stretch between Tortosa and Sant Carles de la Ràpita was never completed before the line was terminated by Renfe in 1973.

== Main sites ==
- Castle of Sant Joan, or Suda, commanding the city from a 59-metre-high (194-foot) hill. Though the Romans were the first to fortify the place, the current structure dates to Muslim Caliph Abd ar-Rahman III. After the conquest by Ramon Berenguer IV, Count of Barcelona, in 1148, it became a residence of the Montcada and the Knights Templar, and from the 13th century it became a royal mansion.
- The Cathedral, begun in 1347 and consecrated in 1597.
- Bishop Palace.
- The Royal Schools. Founded by Charles V for the education of the Moors, are one of the best examples of Renaissance civil architecture in Catalonia. The architectural known as the Royal Colleges will consist of three buildings:
  - The College of Sant Jaume i Sant Maties (it currently houses the local historical archive of Baix Ebre),
  - The church of Sant Domènec (now the Renaissance Interpretation Centre).
- Convent of Santa Clara, founded in 1283.
- The Rose street: Despuig Palace (14th century), Oriol Palace and Capmany Palace.
- Oliver de Boteller Palace (15th century)
- Walls and fortresses: Tenasses, Sitjar, Orleans...
- Architecture of the nineteenth and twentieth centuries: Municipal market, the old municipal slaughterhouse (Museum of Tortosa), Montagut Palace, house Pilar Fontanet, Temple of Repair, house Lamote (Siboni), house Brunet, Sabate clinic, house Ballester, house Bernardo Grego, house Pallares, house Camós, house Llorca, Teodoro González municipal park, etc.
- The Old Jewish Quarter (15th century)
- Air-raid shelter number 4 (Spanish Civil War) in Ernest Hemingway Street.

== Museums ==
- Tortosa Cathedral and the permanent exhibition.
- The Museum of Tortosa.
- The Prince's Gardens, Santiago de Santiago's outdoor Sculpture Museum.
- The Renaissance Interpretation Centre (Church of Sant Domènec-The Royal Schools)
- The Holy Week Interpretation Center (Centre d'Interpretació de la Setmana Santa) is located in St. Anthony Abbot's Church.

== Tortosa, city of the Renaissance ==
- Tortosa Renaissance Festival. Over 3,000 citizens in period costumes and 60 shows a day with over 500 actors transport us to the Tortosa of 500 years ago. In the second half of July, Tortosa celebrates the Renaissance Festival. Under the title the Splendour of a 16th Century City, the Festival commemorates, through a wide range of cultural and recreational activities, the historical period of the 16th century, one of the most interesting periods in our city's existence.

Declared Fiesta of National Tourist Interest of Spain (2005).

== Nature park (Biosphere reserve) ==
- Ports de Tortosa-Beseit. This mountains that lie between Catalonia, Valencia and Aragon, are part of a limestone massif, characterised by its abrupt cliff faces, which has been inhabited by humans since prehistoric times.
- Ebro Delta.

== Twin towns – sister cities ==
Tortosa is twinned with:

- Avignon, France (1968)
- Alcañiz, Spain (1972)
- Vercelli, Italy (2003)
- Le Puy-en-Velay, France (2005)
- Tartus, Syria (2007)

== Demography ==
Historical population
| Year | Pop. | ±% |
|---|---|---|
| 1991 | 29,452 | — |
| 1996 | 30,088 | +2.2% |
| 2001 | 28,933 | −3.8% |
| 2004 | 31,979 | +10.5% |

== Climate ==
Tortosa has a hot-summer mediterranean climate (Csa) in the Köppen climate classification, bordering on a hot semi-arid climate (BSh). Tortosa enjoys a very warm climate for its latitude. Even considering it's located at miles inland from the coastline, this mostly happens because the city lies on the delta of the Ebro river, which acts as a natural barrier against cold fronts. Albeit being a Mediterranean climate, winter months have less precipitation than autumn (common pattern in eastern Spain), but there is still a substantial summer drought.

Climate data for Tortosa 50m (1991-2020). Extremes (1920-present)
| Month | Jan | Feb | Mar | Apr | May | Jun | Jul | Aug | Sep | Oct | Nov | Dec | Year |
|---|---|---|---|---|---|---|---|---|---|---|---|---|---|
| Record high °C (°F) | 28.1 (82.6) | 27.2 (81.0) | 32.5 (90.5) | 33.9 (93.0) | 36.1 (97.0) | 42.4 (108.3) | 43.0 (109.4) | 43.9 (111.0) | 41.4 (106.5) | 34.5 (94.1) | 28.3 (82.9) | 25.6 (78.1) | 43.9 (111.0) |
| Mean daily maximum °C (°F) | 15.0 (59.0) | 16.7 (62.1) | 19.8 (67.6) | 22.2 (72.0) | 25.8 (78.4) | 30.1 (86.2) | 32.8 (91.0) | 33.1 (91.6) | 29.2 (84.6) | 24.5 (76.1) | 18.7 (65.7) | 15.2 (59.4) | 23.6 (74.5) |
| Daily mean °C (°F) | 10.4 (50.7) | 11.4 (52.5) | 14.0 (57.2) | 16.3 (61.3) | 19.8 (67.6) | 24.0 (75.2) | 26.7 (80.1) | 27.0 (80.6) | 23.4 (74.1) | 19.2 (66.6) | 14.0 (57.2) | 10.8 (51.4) | 18.1 (64.5) |
| Mean daily minimum °C (°F) | 5.8 (42.4) | 6.1 (43.0) | 8.2 (46.8) | 10.3 (50.5) | 13.8 (56.8) | 17.8 (64.0) | 20.6 (69.1) | 20.9 (69.6) | 17.6 (63.7) | 13.8 (56.8) | 9.4 (48.9) | 6.4 (43.5) | 12.6 (54.6) |
| Record low °C (°F) | −5.0 (23.0) | −6.4 (20.5) | −2.5 (27.5) | 0.1 (32.2) | 3.8 (38.8) | 9.2 (48.6) | 12.4 (54.3) | 12.4 (54.3) | 9.1 (48.4) | 3.6 (38.5) | −2.0 (28.4) | −3.8 (25.2) | −6.4 (20.5) |
| Average precipitation mm (inches) | 38 (1.5) | 24 (0.9) | 42 (1.7) | 51 (2.0) | 55 (2.2) | 25 (1.0) | 18 (0.7) | 28 (1.1) | 59 (2.3) | 69 (2.7) | 65 (2.6) | 38 (1.5) | 512 (20.2) |
| Average precipitation days (≥ 1 mm) | 4.1 | 3.2 | 4.2 | 5.6 | 5.4 | 3.1 | 2.1 | 3.0 | 4.7 | 5.0 | 4.5 | 4.0 | 48.9 |
| Average snowy days | 0.2 | 0.2 | 0 | 0 | 0 | 0 | 0 | 0 | 0 | 0 | 0 | 0.1 | 0.5 |
| Average relative humidity (%) | 65 | 62 | 60 | 59 | 59 | 56 | 56 | 59 | 63 | 67 | 66 | 68 | 62 |
| Mean monthly sunshine hours | 170 | 181 | 214 | 240 | 270 | 303 | 335 | 291 | 231 | 202 | 168 | 158 | 2,763 |
Source: Agencia Estatal de Meteorología

== Notable people ==
- Ibrahim ibn Yaqub (fl.961-962), traveler and merchant
- Pope Adrian VI (Utrecht, 1459 – Rome, 1523) was Pope of the Catholic Church (1522–1523) and Bishop of Tortosa (1516–1522).
- Francesc Vicent Garcia was an early modern Catalan poet known by the pseudonym of the Vallfogona Rector.
- Pedro de Alberní, was a soldier and discovered Port Alberni (Canada).
- Ramón Cabrera y Griñó (Tortosa, 1806 – Wentworth, 1877) was a Carlist general.
- Manuel Domingo y Sol (Tortosa, 1836 – 1909) was a Roman Catholic priest.
- Felipe Pedrell (Tortosa, 1841 – Barcelona, 1922) was a composer, guitarist and musicologist.
- Jaume Ferran i Clua was a Spanish bacteriologist and sanitarian who lived and worked in Tortosa.
- Agustí Querol Subirats (Tortosa, 1860 – Madrid, 1909) was a prominent sculptor.
- Rafael Vidiella (Tortosa, 1890 – Barcelona, 1982) was a trade unionist and communist politician.
- Pere Estupinyà (Tortosa, 1974 – ), biochemist.

== See also ==
- Battle of Dertosa
- Dertosa
- Taifa of Tortosa
- Shem-Tob ben Isaac of Tortosa
- Bishop of Tortosa
- Roman Catholic Diocese of Tortosa
- Disputation of Tortosa
- Siege of Tortosa (1708)
- Siege of Tortosa (1810-11)
- Tortosa Pact
- Battle of the Ebro (Spanish Civil War)
- CD Tortosa, football team

== Bibliography ==
- Antoni Virgili, "Angli cum multis aliis alienigenis: crusade settlers in Tortosa (second half of the twelfth century)," Journal of Medieval History, 35,3 (2009), 297–312.
