= L'Ampolla =

- Municipality
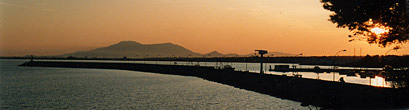
- Ampolla harbour, with Serra del Montsià behind

- Flag Coat of arms

- Location in Catalonia
- Coordinates: 40°48′51″N 0°42′36″E
- Country: Spain
- Community: Catalonia
- Province: Tarragona
- Comarca: Baix Ebre

Government
  - Mayor: Francesc Arasa Pascual (2015)

Area
  - Total: 35.6 km^{2} (13.7 sq mi)
- Elevation: 8 m (26 ft)

Population (2025-01-01)
  - Total: 3,785
  - Density: 106/km^{2} (275/sq mi)
- Demonyms: Ampoller, ampollera
- Website: ampolla.cat

L'Ampolla (Catalan pronunciation: [lamˈpoʎa]) is a municipality in the comarca of the Baix Ebre in Catalonia, Spain. It was created in 1990 by the division of the municipality of el Perelló. It has a population of 3,785 (register office, 2025).

It is situated on the coast south of l'Ametlla de Mar, and is an important tourist centre and minor fishing port. The town is served by the A-7 autopista, the N-340 coast road and by a station on the Renfe railway line between Tarragona and Valencia.

The GR 92 long-distance footpath, which roughly follows the length of the Mediterranean coast of Spain, has a staging point at L'Ampolla. Stage 29 links northwards to L'Ametlla de Mar, a distance of 15.3 kilometres (9.5 mi), whilst stage 30 links southwards to Amposta, a distance of 16.3 kilometres (10.1 mi).

== Bibliography ==
- Panareda Clopés, Josep Maria; Rios Calvet, Jaume; Rabella Vives, Josep Maria (1989). Guia de Catalunya, Barcelona: Caixa de Catalunya. ISBN 84-87135-01-3 (Spanish). ISBN 84-87135-02-1 (Catalan).
