= Alt Empordà fires of 2012 =

2012 pair of fires in Catalonia, Spain

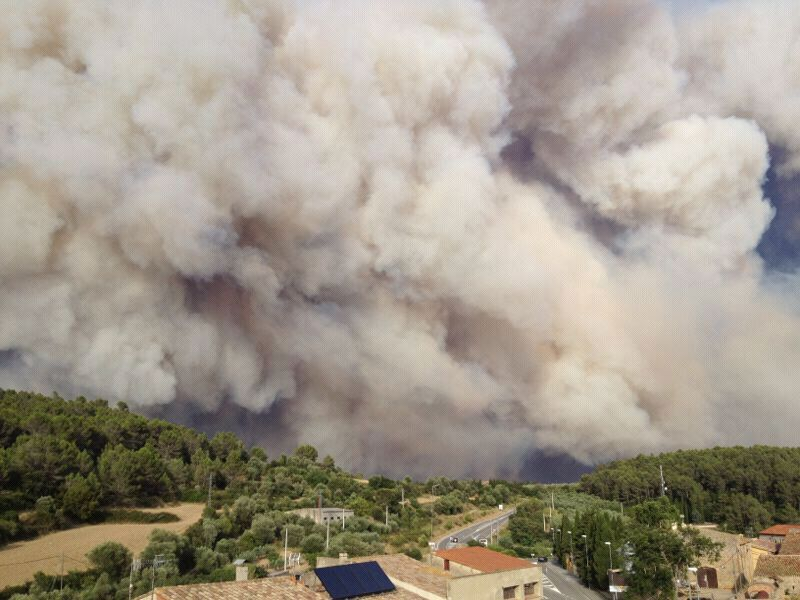
- Terrades
- Date: July 22, 2012 - July 24, 2012
- Location: Alt Empordà, Catalonia, Spain
- Cause: cigarette
- Outcome: Fire extinguished
- Deaths: 4
- Injuries: 25

On July 22, 2012 two fires in Alt Empordà, Catalonia, Spain started in la Jonquera and in Portbou that affected the Girona Province for three days. The first started during midday; it has affected 13,800 hectares (included in this are some 3,000 hectares of crops that have not burned) 19 municipalities and caused two deaths. The fire of Portbou, moreover, began at 19:00 and was controlled in a few hours, burning 50 hectares and killing two people trying to flee the encroaching flames by jumping from the cliffs into the sea. In total, 3,200 residents were left without electricity and 1,700 without phone.

== Precedents ==
This was the largest fire in the area since 1986. Between July 17–24 of 1986 a serious fire burned out of control, devastating 26,000 hectares and killing the four man crew of a French seaplane. On August 7, 2000 a fire began in Cap de Creus that burned 6,513 hectares; much of the Parc Natural.

== Context ==
Both fires occurred during a summer very conducive to fires as Catalonia has suffered major droughts in the past 40 years. In addition, many forests were in poor condition after the snowstorm of 2010.

In February, 2012 the Fire Department had reported to Parliament that the cuts would undermine their work, "reducing their capacity by 378,000 working hours of what the country will need for summer."

== La Jonquera fire ==
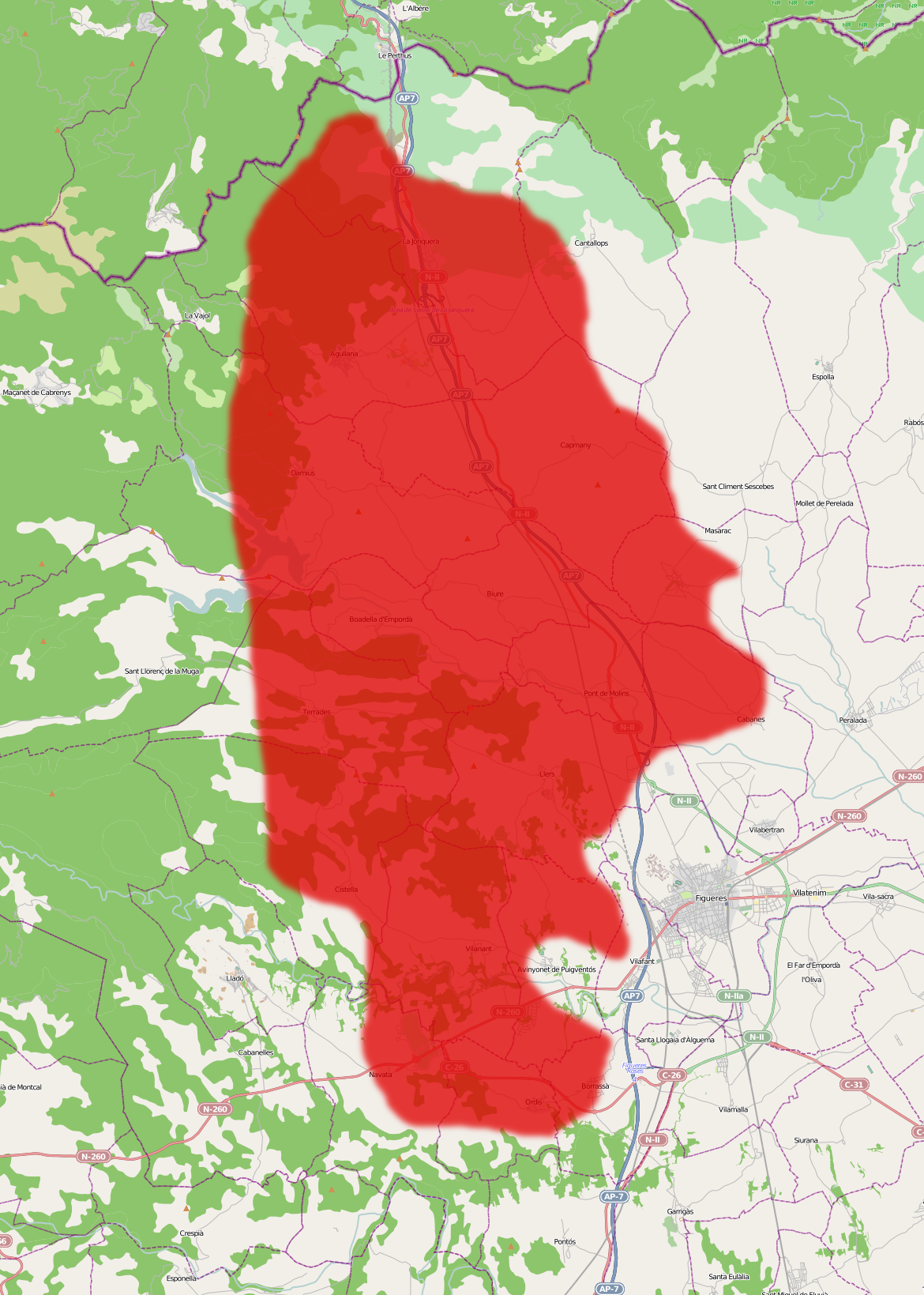
Area affected by the fires of la Jonquera

The first of two fires that affected the region was declared a little before noon on July 2, 2012 at the edges of the 779th kilometer N-II (in parking lot of trucks about 500 meters from the border crossing with France). Of the two fires, this was the most devastating in terms of the amount of land affected (about 14,000 hectares).

=== Causes ===
The disaster was caused by negligence, as noted by the President of the Generalitat of Catalonia, Artur Mas, from the fire station in Figueres. The Minister of Interior, Felip Puig said that the fire—just like what happened to Portbou—began on the shoulder of the road; later the forest rangers found hundreds of cigarette butts in the area where the fire originated, which gave further strength to the hypothesis that the fire had been caused by human negligence.

=== Path of the fire ===
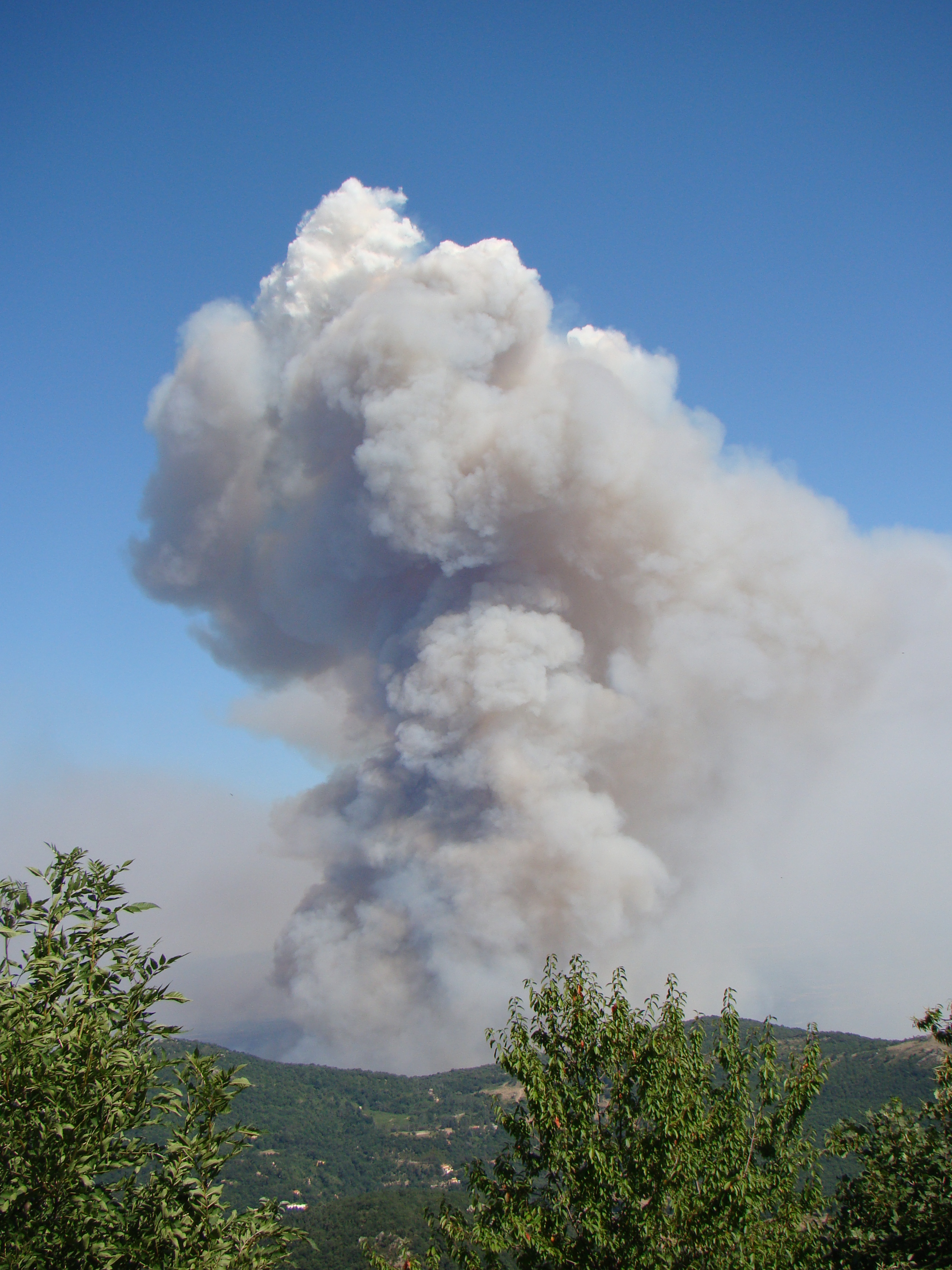
La Jonquera fire seen from the road of Puig de Fontreda, Ceret to Puig de les Pedrisses (Morellàs i les Illes) on Jul 23, 2012

The fire spread very quickly, fueled by the strong tramuntana winds and affecting almost 14,000 hectares, from Albera National Park down, nearly to the town of Figueres. This composition of the area was 51% were trees, 22% crops, and 19% brush. Of the 14,000 hectares, 3,000 (containing agricultural crops) were not burned. The fire threatened the towns of Llers and Capmany reaching homes and burning some in Jonquera and Agullana. At points, the flames reached five meters in height.

The increasingly strong southwest and eastern winds created fears that fire would enter into the Garrotxa region and affect the Garrotxa Volcanic Natural Park, thus making it more difficult to combat the fire on land due to the dense forest and the topography of the land. According to Felip Puig, Minister of Interior of the Generalitat of Catalonia they are currently working to protect the most sensitive points around Terrades, southern Boadella, Darnius and Agullana, and the northern regions of el Pertús and Cantallops.

=== Consequences ===
The la Jonquera fire left two people dead: the first, suffered a heart attack in the town of Llers, after being trapped by flames in the garden of his home and the second died after suffering burns to 80% of the body in an explosion of fuel tanks in Agullana. Eight people were hospitalized, six of them serious injuries. Furthermore, several sections of the northern part of la Jonquera were evacuated along with some farms and residential areas that were far removed from urban centers of the Alt Empordà.

As soon as the fire was declared, they AP-7 and N-II were closed to traffic along with several county roads and the AVE line to la Jonquera. Due to the fire, the electricity company, Endesa estimated that more than 3,000 people in 21 towns remained without power. The authorities required a curfew for the entire population of Alt Empordà from the afternoon of 22nd which was slowly revoked in later days. Some 1,300 people spent the nights of 22nd and 23rd in emergency shelters in the region.

The 19 municipalities affected were as follows: la Jonquera, Agullana, Darnius, Boadella i les Escaules, Terrades, Vilarnadal, Avinyonet de Puigventós, Vilafant, Figueres, Llers, Pont de Molins, Biure, Masarac, Cabanes, Sant Climent Sescebes, Capmany, Cantallops, Vilanant i Cistella. The smoke and smell of the fire was encountered in Barcelona as well as further south. Smoke was also seen around Céret, France.

The region is a well known grower of wine grapes and olives which form a large portion of income for the region. Overall, most of the vineyards were not affected by the fire as they acted as a natural firebreak due to how they are cultivated. Some were immersed in a considerable amount of smoke, but did not burn.

=== Aftermath ===
The fire left many trees and shrubs burnt around La Jonquera, although little of the town's structures were burnt. The final death toll was four.

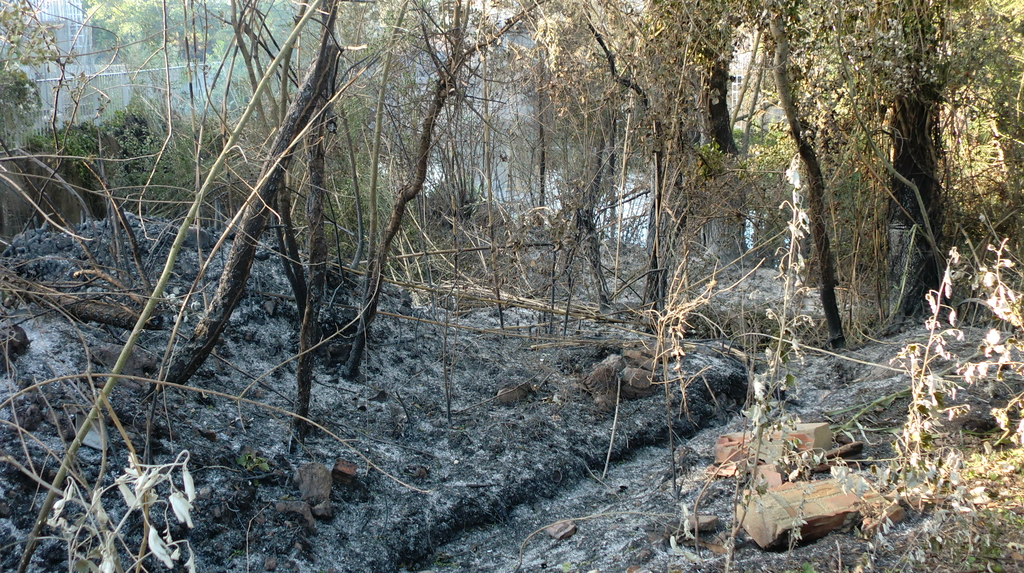
Fire damage near Pont de Molnis

== Portbou fire ==
Alongside the fire started in la Jonquera, another started in the municipality of Portbou, in the northeast area of Alt Empordà, near the border with France. It started on Sunday, the 22nd July at 19:00 and three hours later, at 22:00, it was already under control.

=== Causes ===
The mayor of Portbou, José Luis Salas, said that the fire could have been caused by a cigarette thrown from the road, just like the fire started in the Jonquera. Some sources suggest that the fire started near the gas station in the town.

== Gallery ==
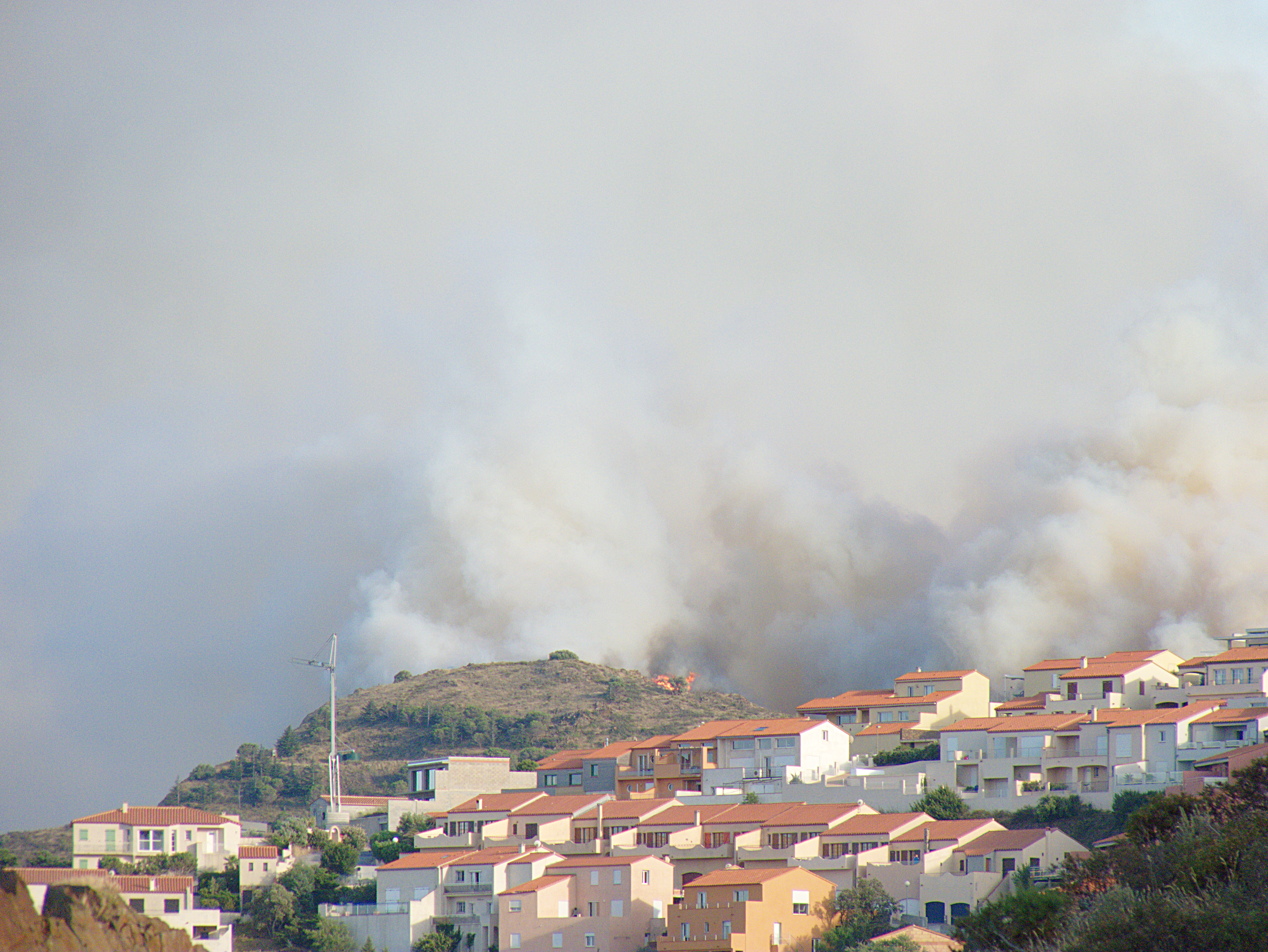
Fire of Portbou seen from Cervera de la Marenda on the 22nd of July

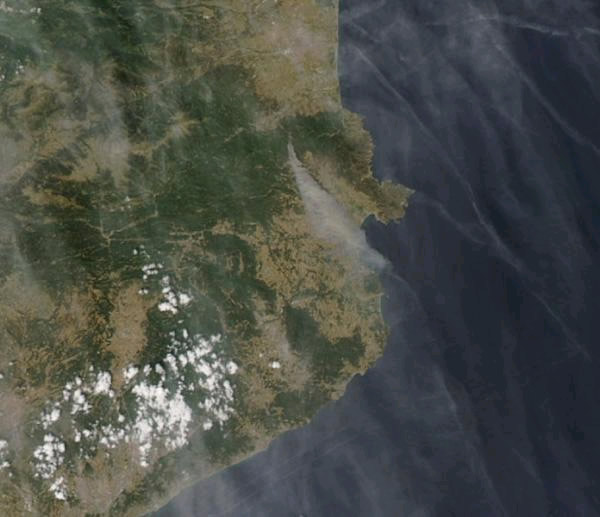
Satellite image from NASA showing the start of the fire in la Jonquera
