= Fort de Bellegarde =

Coordinates: 42°27′31″N 2°51′33″E

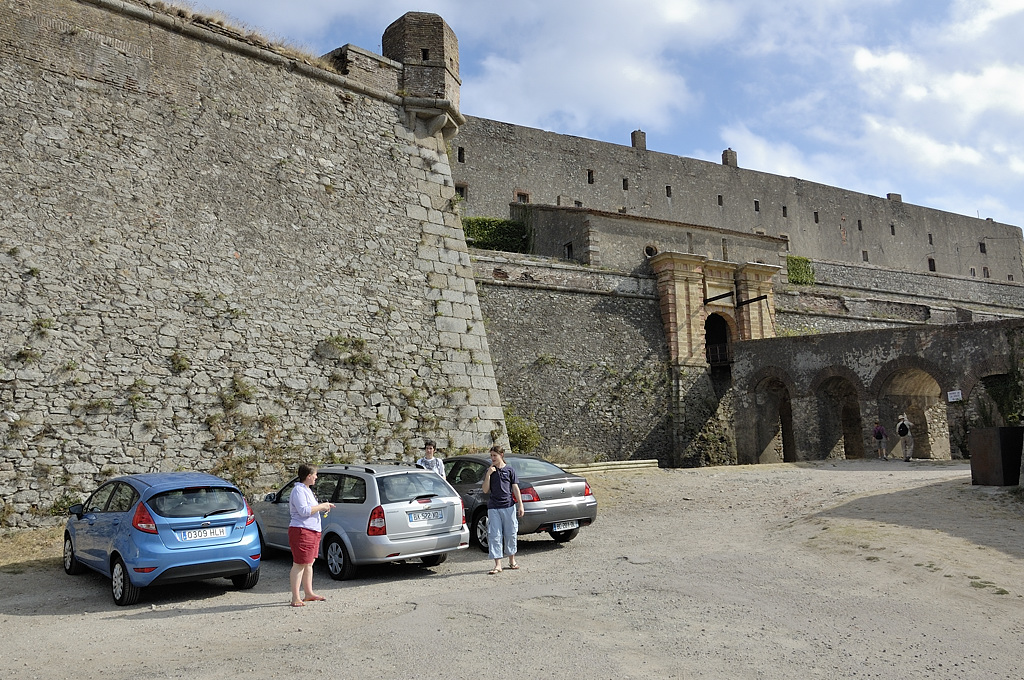
Entrance to the fort

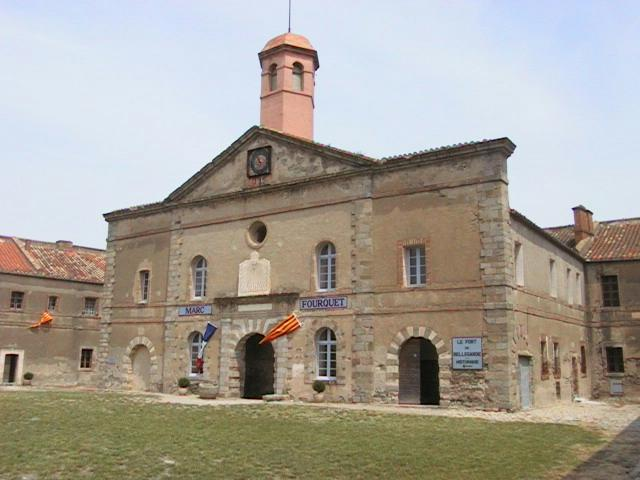
Barracks building

The Fort de Bellegarde (Fort or Castell de Bellaguarda / Bellaguàrdia in Catalan) is a 17th-century bastion fortification located above the town of Le Perthus, in the Pyrénées-Orientales département of southern France.

== History ==
Le Perthus became French territory after the Treaty of the Pyrenees (1659). Bellegarde was captured by the Spaniards in 1674, but retaken by Schomberg in 1675.

In 1678, Vauban's plans for the new fortress of Bellegarde were approved.

During the War of the Pyrenees, the fortress was besieged in May - June 1793 by the Spanish and then by the French (May - Sept. 1794).

During World War II, the fort was used as a holding prison by the Gestapo for escaped prisoners of war and enemy agents.

== In popular culture ==
In 1974, scenes from the Charles Bronson film Breakout were filmed at the Fort. The filmmakers were portraying an actual helicopter prison escape similar to one that occurred in Mexico in 1971.

== Tourism ==
The fort is open to the public between April and October only and includes exhibits on the history of the fort, its archaeology and the surrounding area. As a property of the state, it has been listed since 1967 as a monument historique by the French Ministry of Culture.

== See also ==
- Le Perthus Pyramid
- Els Límits
