= Communauté de communes du Vallespir =

Community of comumunes in Pyrénées-Orientales, France

- Community
- Interactive map of Communauté de communes du Vallespir
- Coordinates: 42°29′41.71″N 2°44′29.99″E
- Country: France
- Region: Occitanie
- Department: Pyrénées-Orientales

Population (2022)
  - Total: 20,490
  - Density: 111/km^{2} (290/sq mi)

The Communauté de communes du Vallespir is a community of communes in the Pyrénées-Orientales department in the Occitanie region in southern France.

== Toponymy ==
The community of communes takes its name from the natural and historical region of Vallespir, in the valley of the river Tech. It occupies the territory of Bas-Vallespir. Further upstream is the community of communes of Haut Vallespir.

== History ==
It was created by a decree of 24 December 1996 (effective 31 December 1996). On 1 January 2014, the municipalities of L'Albère, Les Cluses and Le Perthus joined the community of communes.
