= La Jonquera =

- Municipality
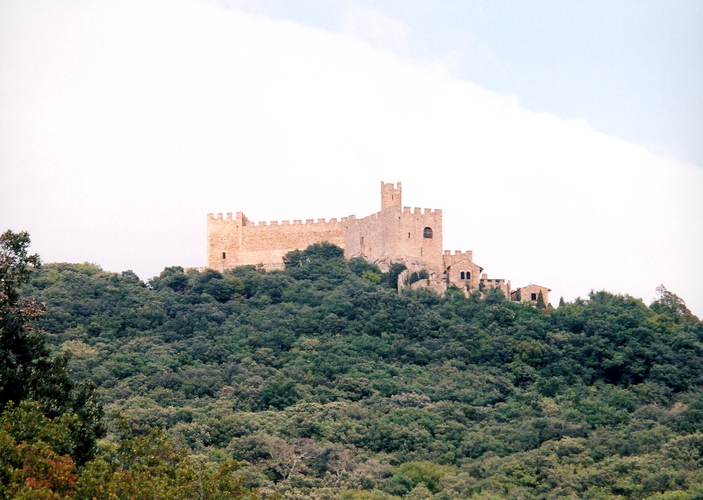
- Panorama of the Requesens Castle

- Flag Coat of arms

- Location in Catalonia La Jonquera (Spain)
- Coordinates: 42°25′11″N 2°52′31″E
- Country: Spain
- Community: Catalonia
- Province: Girona
- Comarca: Alt Empordà

Government
  - Mayor: Sònia Martínez Juli (2015)

Area
  - Total: 56.9 km^{2} (22.0 sq mi)
- Elevation: 110 m (360 ft)

Population (2025-01-01)
  - Total: 3,420
  - Density: 60.1/km^{2} (156/sq mi)
- Demonyms: Jonquerenc, jonquerenca, jonquereño, jonquereña
- Website: www.lajonquera.cat

La Jonquera (Catalan pronunciation: [lə ʒuŋˈkeɾə]; Spanish: La Junquera) is a municipality in the comarca of l'Alt Empordà, in Catalonia, Spain. It is situated next to the border with France, opposite the municipality of Le Perthus.

== History ==
The area has always been an important passage through the Pyrenees. The contemporary AP-7 highway extends not far from the ancient Roman road, the Via Augusta. Nearby there is an altar erected by Pompey on the Coll de Panissars. The name comes precisely from the Roman mansion of Iuncaria, which is not located under the current population but several kilometers away, in Figueras.6

La Junquera was the scene of a conflict involving retreating French crusaders in 1285 that ended in their defeat.

From the 13th century until the end of the manorial regime, in the mid-19th century, it was the possession of the Rocabertí family. The Treaty of the Pyrenees (1659) placed the new border between the Spanish and French monarchies in the Albera mountain range, a fact that marked the subsequent history of La Junquera.

== Geography ==
List of toponyms in La Jonquera (Topography: mountains, ranges, hills, places...; hydrography: rivers, fountains...; buildings: houses, farmhouses, churches, etc.).

It is located at the northern end of the Alt Empordà, on the border with the northern Catalan region of Vallespir through the Pertús Pass, the current border between the Spanish and French states. Crashed in the Sierra de l'Albera. Cork oak forests predominate there.

The old town of Requesens (to the east of the town) has been part of the Albera Natural Site of National Interest since 1986.

The N-II road and the AP-7 highway (access exit number 2) connect La Jonquera with the rest of the region and Catalonia, and give it access to one of the main international communication routes between the Spanish states and French.

== Civil parishes ==
La Jonquera (2,888 inhabitants in the village) has 4 civil parishes (poblaciones). The village of Els Límits is situated on the French-Spanish border, contiguous to its French twin town, Le Perthus.

Village	Population (2005)
Canadal	9
Els Límits	115
Requesens	0
Sant Julià	4

== Shield ==
The shield of La Jonquera is a cantoned shield, made of silver, a bundle of reeds made of chinople with a gold binding. The shield is crowned by a villa mural crown. The reeds are a traditional speaking element, related to the name of the town.

The shield was approved on 17 December 1990.

== Interesting places ==
- Albera Natural Site of National Interest
- Jonquera ponds
- Exile Memorial Museum (MUME)
- Parish Church of Santa Maria, late 18th century (15th century facade).
- In the Panissars pass there are the remains of a medieval Benedictine priory, Santa Maria de Panissars and the foundations of a large Roman building, identified with the Mansio Summum Pyrenaeum (at the meeting point between Via Domitia and Via Augusta) and the trophies that Pompey erected after defeating Sertorius.

Castles declared cultural assets of national interest:

- The old town of Requesens, accessible by Cantallops, has the Shrine of Our Lady of Requesens and the castle of Requesens, rebuilt at the end of the 19th century.
- Ruins of the old castle of Rocabertí, former seat of the viscounty of the same name.
- The castle of Canadal

Romanesque hermitages:

- Sant Jaume de Canadal from the 9th century
- Sant Pere del Pla de l'Arca
- Sant Martí del Forn del Vidre from the 10th century
- Santa Llúcia de la Jonquera
- Sant Miquel de Solans
- Sant Julià dels Torts from the twelfth century.
- The casal of Ca l'Armet, on Carrer Major, of the modern era, with rooms decorated with paintings and an important family archive.
- La Porta Catalana (built by Josep Lluís Sert in 1982), in the Jonquera service area, on the AP7 motorway.

Megalithic monuments:

- Canadal dolmen
- Dolmens of Mas Baleta I - II - III
- Dolmens of the Estanys I - II - III
- Dolmens of Coll de Madàs I - II
- Dolmen of the Mesclants
- Dolmen of Plan de l'Arca
- Menhirs of the Ponds I - II

== Forest fires ==
The area around La Jonquera was seriously affected by fatal wildfires that devastated large swathes of forestry in northern Catalonia in July 2012.

== Demography ==
1900	1930	1950	1970	1986	2007
1588	1273	1199	1964	2582	3075

== Economy ==
Rainfed farming and cork handling were traditionally the most important economic activities. At present, the basis of the municipal economy is the activity derived from the Portús customs office - the name of the town of Pertús in Emporda, part of which (the Límits district) belongs to La Jonquera.

== Prostitution ==
The New York Times reported that one of Europe's largest brothels opened in La Jonquera in 2010, taking advantage of Europe's open borders and "tax laws". Many of its clients reportedly come from France, where prostitution was made illegal in April 2016. According to the paper, "Advocates and police officials say that most of the women are controlled by illegal networks — they are modern-day slaves."

== External linksExternal links[edit] ==
- Pàgina web de l'Ajuntament
- Lloc web del Consell Comarcal de l'Alt Empordà Arxivat 2010-08-27 a Wayback Machine.
- Informació de la Generalitat de Catalunya
- Informació de l'Institut d'Estadística de Catalunya
- megàlits de l'Albera
