= Els Límits =

- Village
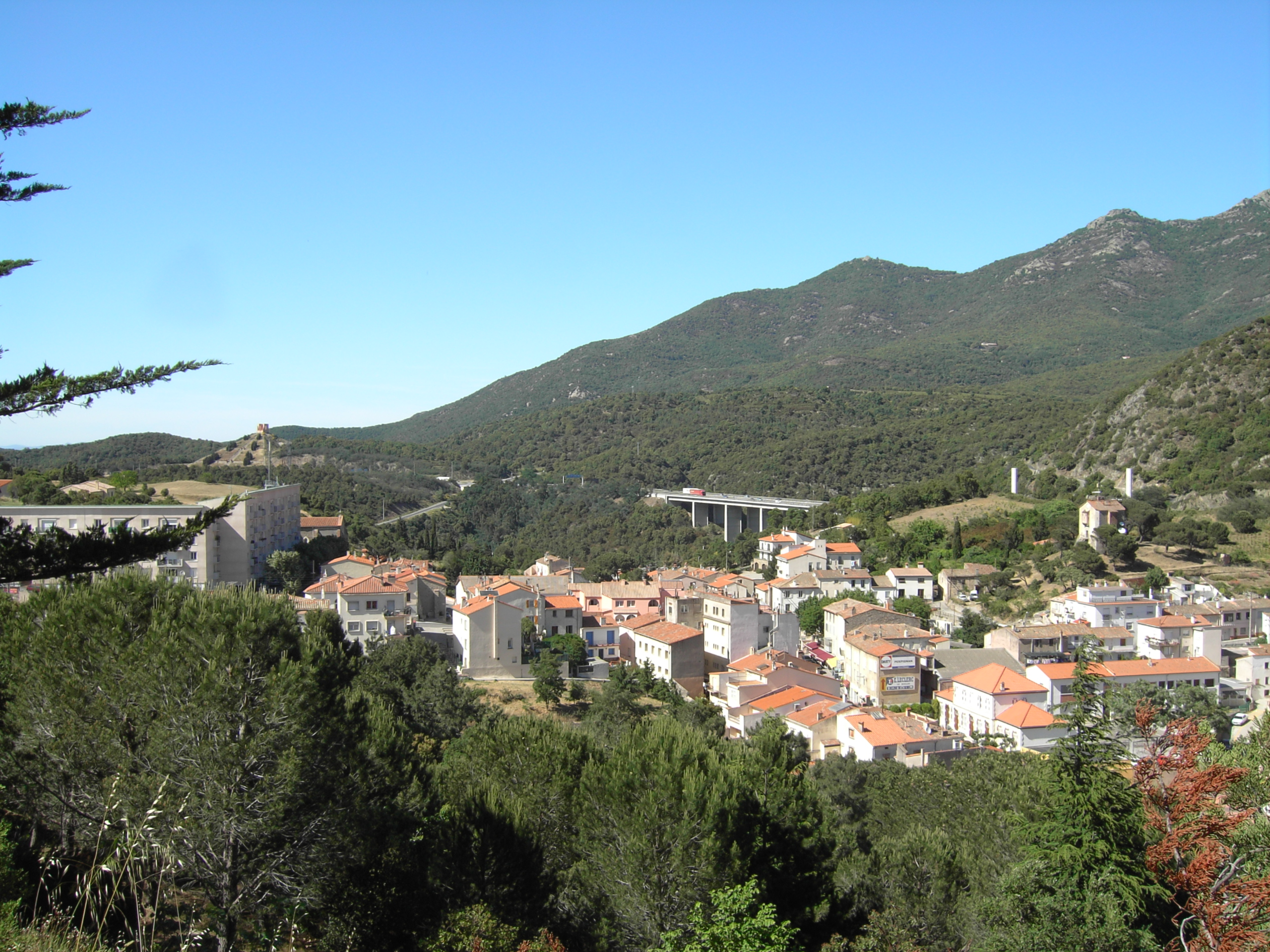
- View of the French town of Le Perthus from the Fort de Bellegarde. Els Límits is in the right side

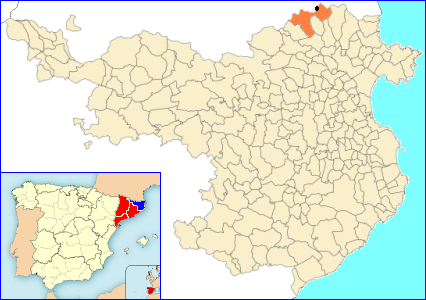
- Els Límits (black dot) in la La Jonquera municipality (orange) within the Province of Girona. Spanish map in the corner shows the province of Girona (blue) and the rest of Catalonia (red)

- Locator map of Els Limits in Spain
- Coordinates: 42°27′39.6″N 2°51′48″E
- Country: Spain
- Community: Catalonia
- Province: Girona
- Comarca: Alt Empordà
- Municipality: La Jonquera
- Elevation: 250 m (820 ft)

Population (2005)
  - Total: 115
- Time zone: UTC+1 (CET)
  - Summer (DST): UTC+2 (CEST)
- Postal code: 17700
- Area code: (+34) ...
- Demonym: Limiters (Ca); Limiteros (Es)

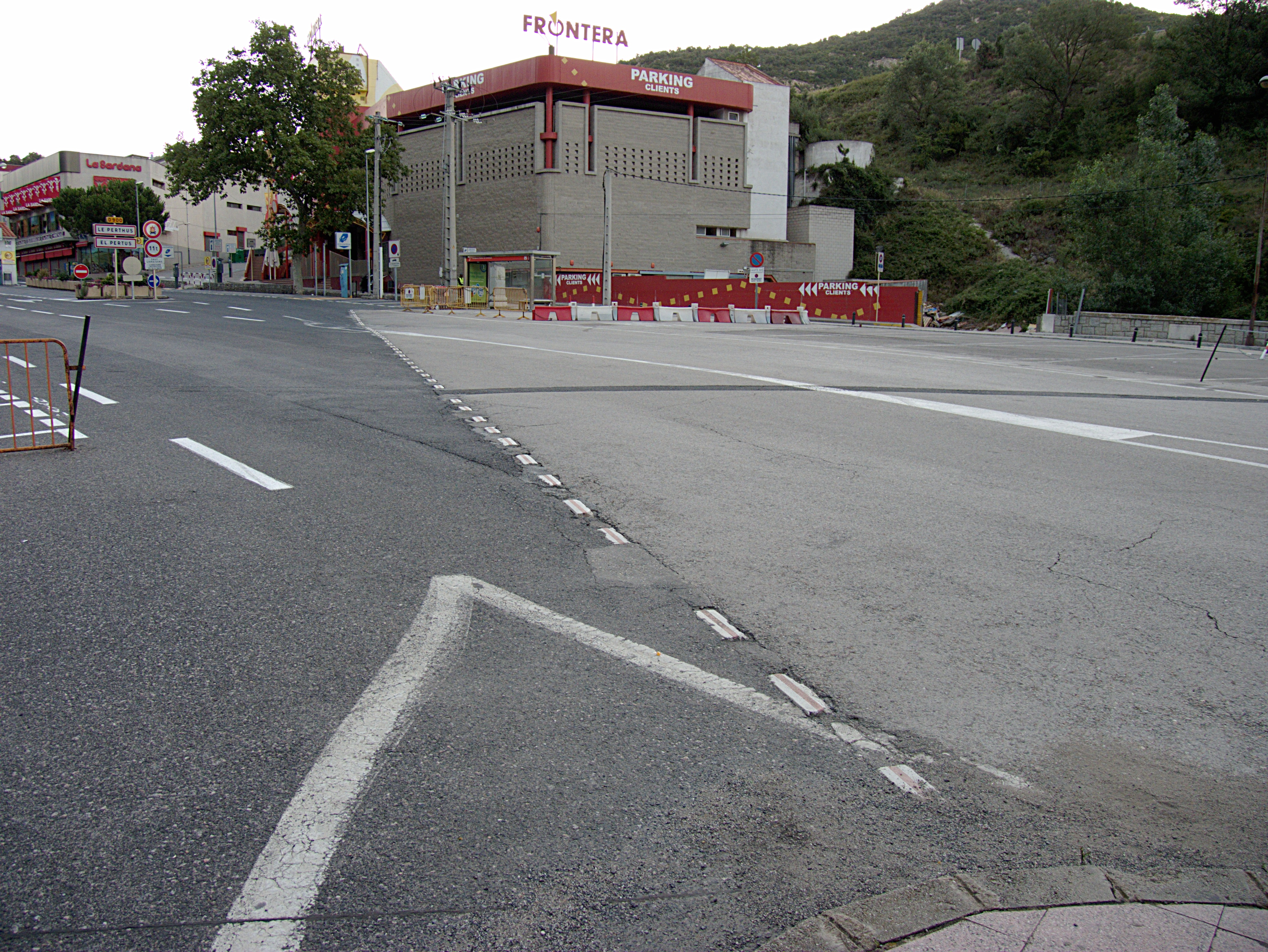
The southern frontier line between Els Límits (right side) and Le Perthus (left side)

Els Límits (Catalan pronunciation: [əlz ˈlimits]) is a Spanish village, a civil parish of the municipality of La Jonquera, situated in the province of Girona, Catalonia, in Spain. As of 2005 its population was of 115. Its Spanish name is Los Límites.

== History ==
The origins of the division of the village go back to the 17th century when, with the Treaty of the Pyrenees (after the 1635-1659 Franco-Spanish War), the frontier line between France and Spain was established along the mountain range of the Pyrenees.

== Geography ==
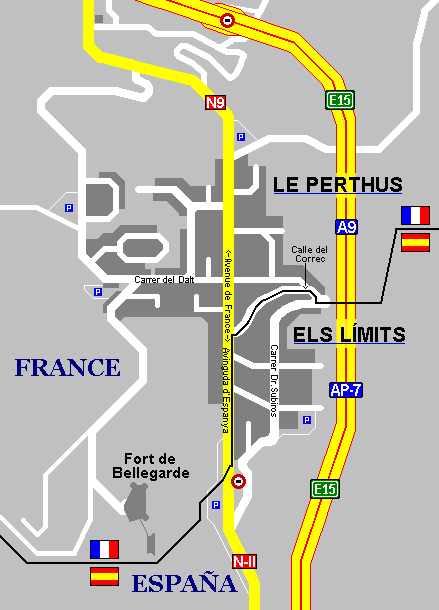
Map of the twin villages

Els Límits, roughly meaning "the borders", is situated on the border with the French administrative region of Occitania, close to the historical region of Vallespir. Its contiguous French twin town, Le Perthus (a municipality in the Pyrénées-Orientales department), is situated in the north and west side of the urban area. Also part of the main road, Avinguda d'Espanya, is both in France and Spain; and its western side (in Le Perthus) is named Avenue de France.

Out of the main road, in which is situated the checkpoint, the other principal roads are Carrer del Doctor Subiros, Calle del Correc (binational), Carrer de Fàtima and Carrer d'Hannibal. It lies 5 km (3 mi) from La Jonquera, 27 km (17 mi) from Figueres, 35 km (22 mi) from Perpignan/Perpinyà, 63 km (39 mi) from Girona and 160 km (99 mi) from Barcelona.

=== Gallery ===
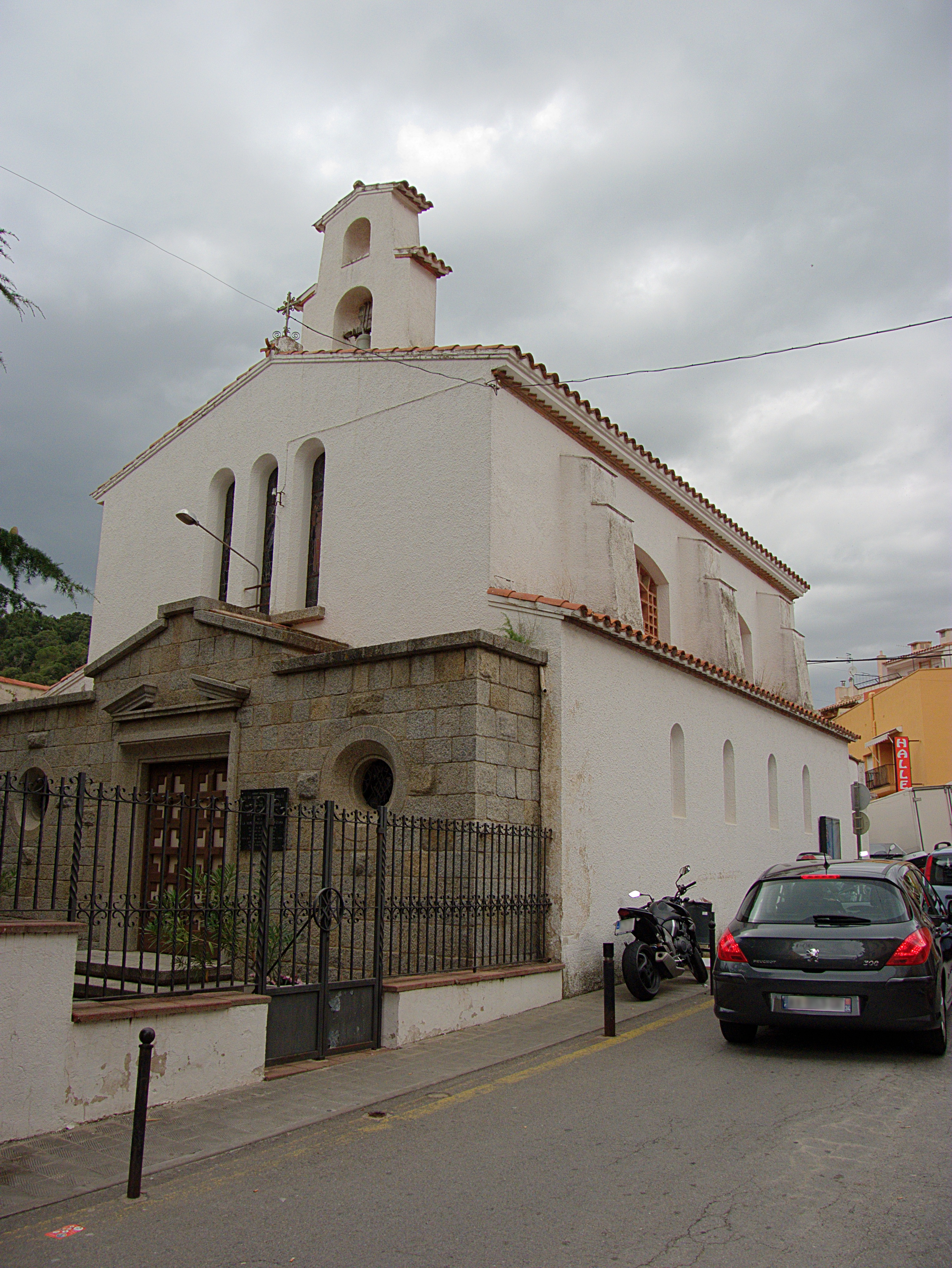
The Sanctuary of Fàtima

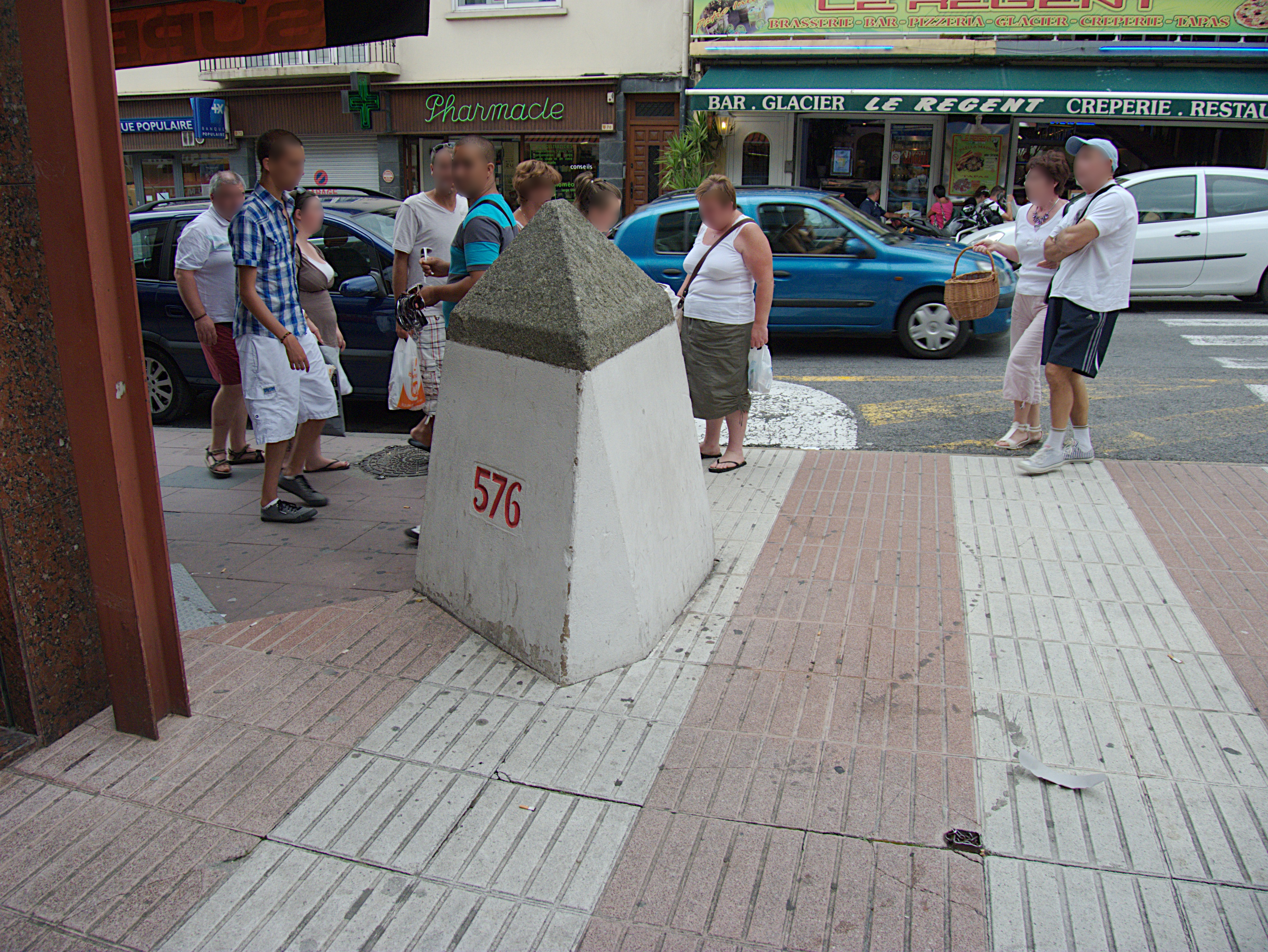
Frontier line on the central "Avenue de France" (Le Perthus, right) / "Avinguda d'Espanya" (Els Límits, left)

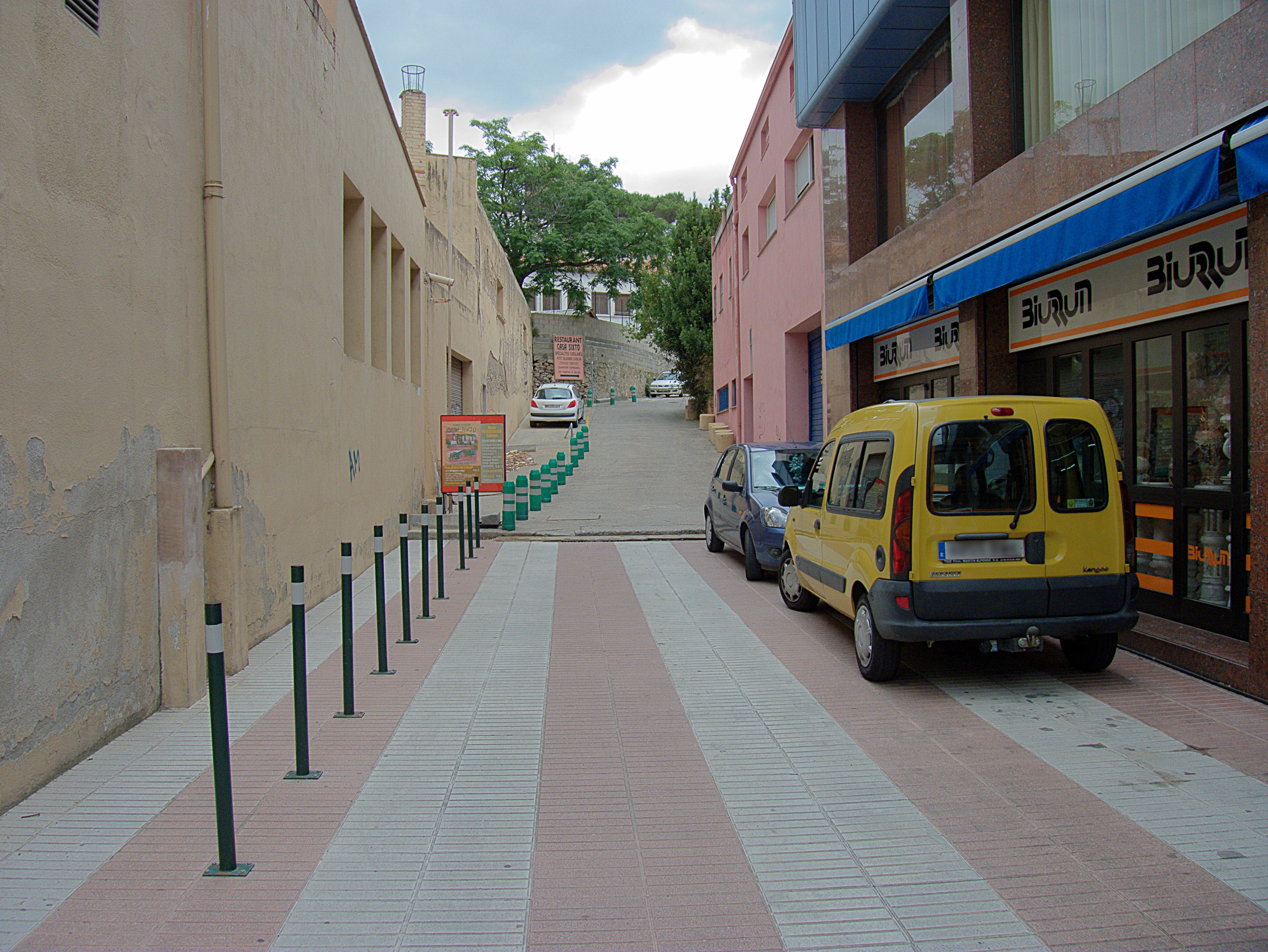
The international road "Rue du Petit Pont" (Le Perthus, left) / "Carrer del Còrrec" (Els Límits, right)

== Economy ==
As a border town between Spain and France, it is largely composed by trade buildings and it is almost entirely devoted to the sale of alcohol, tobacco and other goods which are considerably cheaper than in France. In earlier times, as Le Perthus, it was a convenient centre of contraband.

== Transport ==
Els Límits, not served by the railway, is crossed by the national road N-II, which continues as Route nationale 9 (RN9) entering French territory. The adjacent motorway, AP-7 (La Jonquera-Barcelona-Valencia-Alicante-Vera), continues as A9 (Le Perthus-Perpignan-Montpellier-Orange) in France. The nearest motorway exits are "La Jonquera" (AP-7) and "Le Boulou" (A9).

== See also ==
- Fort de Bellegarde (on a hilltop above Le Perthus)
