= Cantallops =

- Municipality
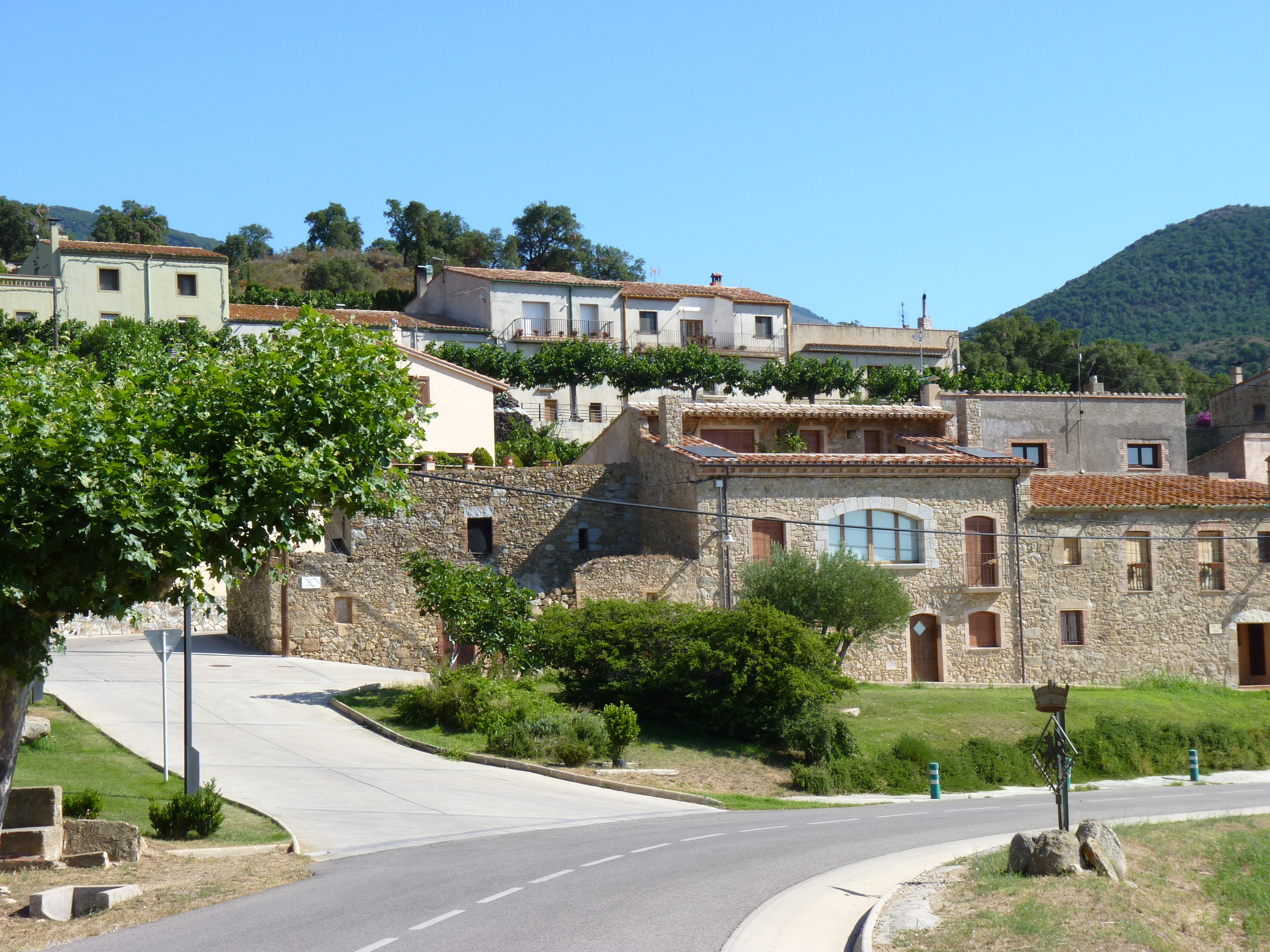
- Entrance to the village

- Flag Coat of arms

- Location in Catalonia Cantallops (Spain)
- Coordinates: 42°25′28″N 2°55′34″E
- Country: Spain
- Community: Catalonia
- Province: Girona
- Comarca: Alt Empordà

Government
  - Mayor: Joan Sabartés Olivet (2015)

Area
  - Total: 19.6 km^{2} (7.6 sq mi)
- Elevation: 200 m (660 ft)

Population (2025-01-01)
  - Total: 366
  - Density: 18.7/km^{2} (48.4/sq mi)
- Demonym(s): Cantallobenc, cantallobenca
- Website: www.cantallops.cat

Cantallops (Catalan pronunciation: [ˌkantəˈʎops]) is a municipality in the comarca of the Alt Empordà in Girona, Catalonia, Spain. It is situated below the Albera Range, and is linked to La Jonquera by the GI-601 road.

The town originated around the ancient Cantallops castle, documented since the 13th century. Currently, only partial remains remain, a fragment of the wall and a single tower that, in the 19th century, was converted into a bell tower of the parochial church of Sant Esteve.

== Demography ==
1900	1930	1950	1970	1986	2007
731	571	461	414	259	295
