= Requesens Castle =

Coordinates: 42°26′47.85″N 2°56′39.84″E

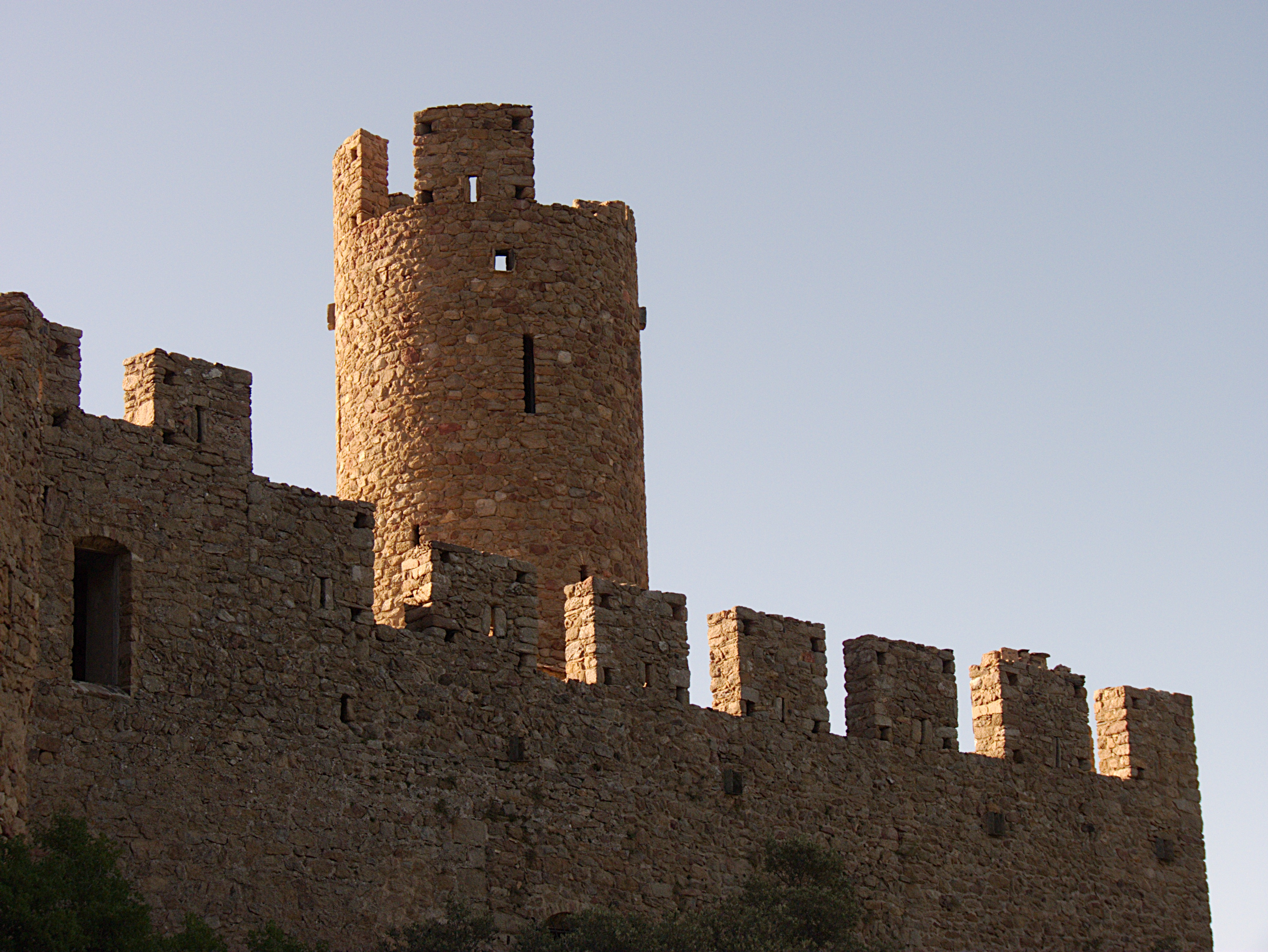
Requesens Castle.

Requesens Castle is situated on a hill overlooking the southern valleys of Mount Neulós, approximately 7 km east of the Requesens neighbourhood. For centuries, it has controlled the passage into Spain and corresponds to the ancient village of Requesens, a settlement in La Jonquera.

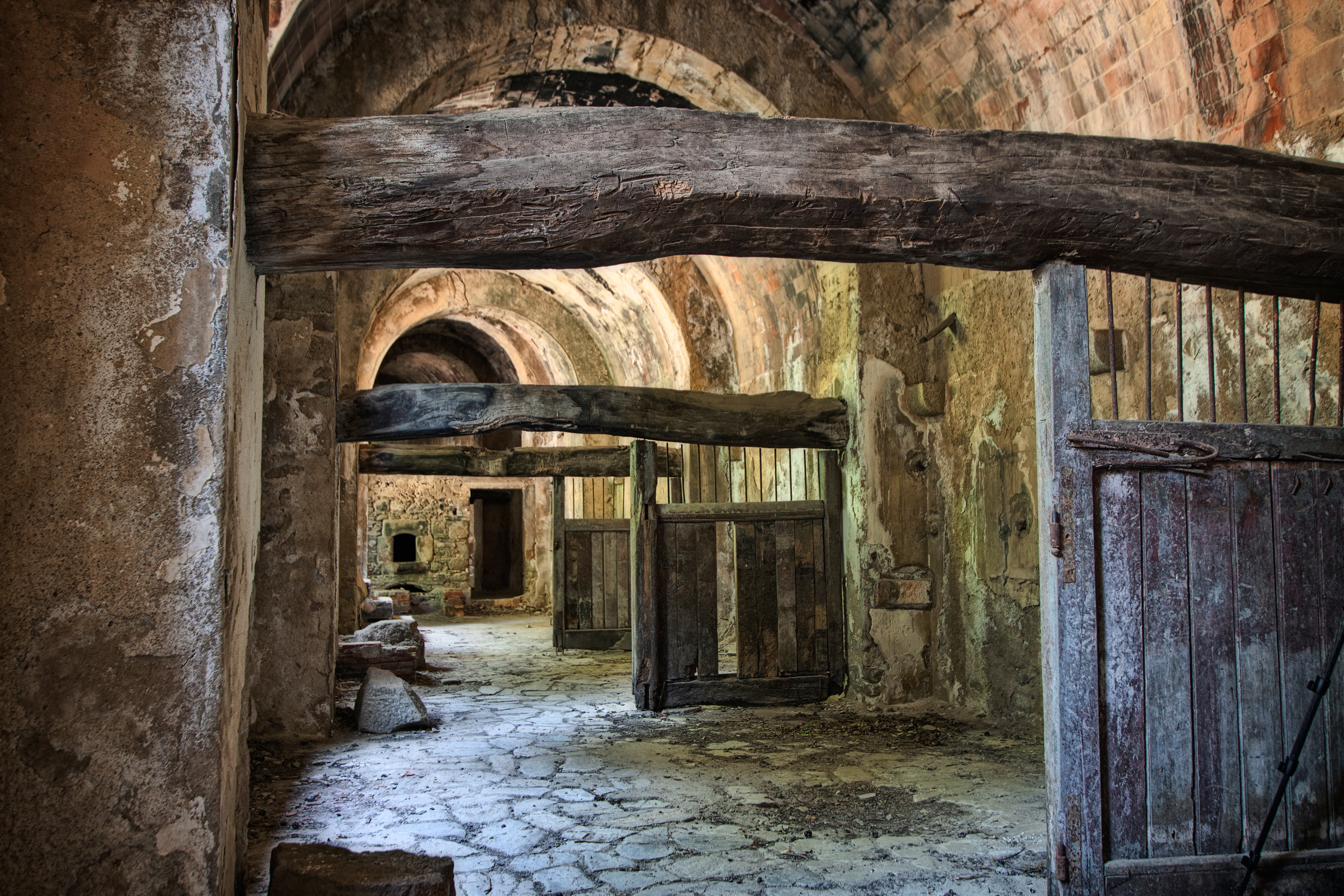
The stables of the castle

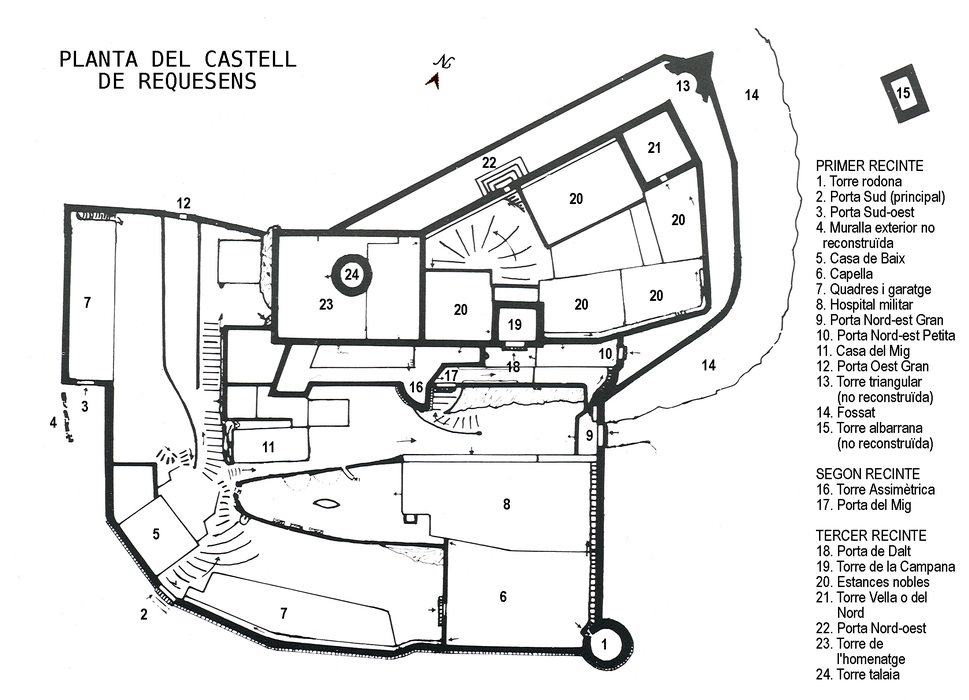
Floor plan of the reconstructed castle.

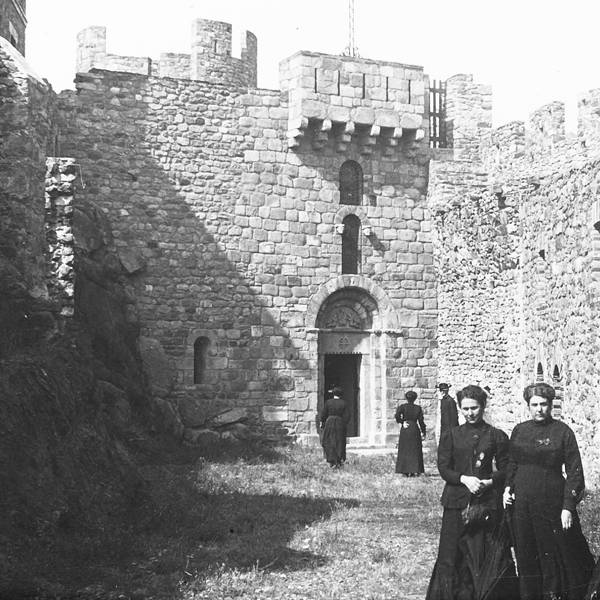
Courtyard of the first enclosure (1912)

== Bibliography ==
- Joan Badia i Homs, L'arquitectura medieval a l'Empordà, 2a ed., 2 vols., Girona, Diputació Provincial de Girona, 1985, vol. II-A, pp. 210-211, i II-B, pp. 562-563 (en catalán)
- Ferran del Campo i Jordà, El Castell de Requesens, Figueres, Brau, 1993 (en catalán)
- Pere Català i Roca, Miquel Oliva i Prat y Miquel Brasó i Vaqués, "Castell de Requesens", dins Els castells catalans, 7 vols., Barcelona, Rafael Dalmau, 1967-1979, vol. 2, pp. 421-434 (en catalán)
- Pere Català i Roca, Legendes de castells catalans, Barcelona, Rafael Dalmau, 1983 (en catalán)
- Catalunya Romànica, 27 vols., Barcelona, Enciclopèdia Catalana, 1984-1998, vol. 9, p. 505 (en catalán)
- Antoni Egea Codina, "El mestre d'obres Alexandre Comalat i la restauració del Castell de Requesens", Annals de l'Institut d'Estudis Empordanesos, 18 (1985), 343-358 (en catalán)
- Lluís Monreal i Martí de Riquer, Els castells medievals de Catalunya, 3 vols., Barcelona, Falcó, 1955-1965, vol. 1, pp. 161-167 (en catalán)
- Pelai Negre i Pastell "El castillo de Requesens", Anales del Instituto de Estudios Gerundenses, 9 (1954), 171-232 (en catalán)
- Pelai Negre i Pastell "El linaje de los Requesens", Anales del Instituto de Estudios Gerundenses, 10 (1955), 25-148 (en catalán)
- Pelai Negre i Pastell, "El castillo y el linaje de Requesens", Revista de Gerona, 33 (1965), 7-14 y 34 (1966), 7-17 (en catalán)
- Inés Padrosa i Gorgot, "Don Tomàs de Rocabertí, el primer fotògraf amateur de la comarca", Annals de l'Institut d'Estudis Empordanesos, 36 (2003), 243-264 (en catalán)
- Lluís M. Vidal, "Excursió al castell de Requesens, Agullana, Besalú, Olot y Collsacabra", Butlletí del Centre Excursionista de Catalunya, 9/54 (1899), 161-176, y 9/55 (1899), 177-201 (en catalán)
