= Francesca Torrent =

Spanish writer

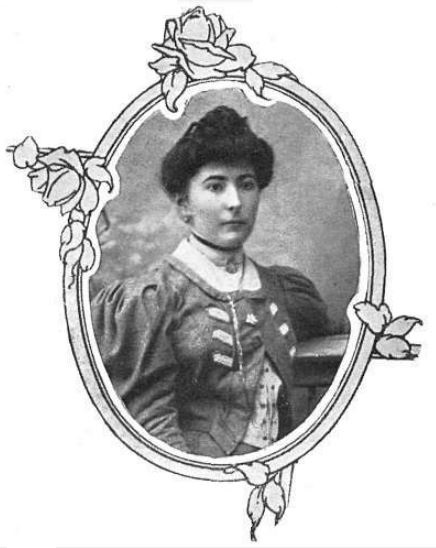
- Torrent in Feminal (26 July 1908)
- Born: Francesca Torrent Boschdemont; 18 April 1881; Agullana, Alt Empordà, Spain
- Died: 15 April 1958 (aged 76); Barcelona, Spain
- Occupation: writer
- Spouse: Jeroni Figa Sala
- Children: 10
- Writing career
- Pen name: Miosotis
- Language: Catalan
- Genres: poetry; prose
- Subjects: rural and traditional themes; conservative ideology; Marian devotion
- Notable work: Almas pariones
- Notable awards: Banyoles Floral Games award; Girona Provincial Council prize
- Literary movement: Second Republic

Francesca Torrent Boschdemont (18 April 1881 – 15 April 1958) was a Spanish writer in the Catalan language who sometimes used the pseudonym Miosotis. Her prose and poetry, mostly rural, traditional, and religious, remained outside the cultural currents of the 20th century, as her main inspiration came from the Renaixença and popular poetry.

== Early life and education ==
Francesca Torrent Boschdemont was born at the Can Genís farmhouse in Agullana, into a family of rural landowners. After an early education that included religious and moral training, she moved to Girona to study teaching, although she never worked as a teacher.

== Career ==
From a very young age, influenced by her paternal grandfather, the poet Joaquim Torrent, she began publishing poetry and prose on rural and traditional themes in publications such as El Correo de Gerona, Lo Geronés, Gente Nueva, El Deber, and El Tradicionalista. Coinciding with the appearance of the first Catalan-language magazines for women, Torrent began contributing to Oro y Grana and Feminal.

In 1907, she married Jeroni Figa Sala, with whom she had 10 children. The couple, who moved to Banyoles and later to Girona, suffered financial difficulties as the family grew. During the 1920s and 1930s, she wrote tenaciously, her poetry centered on family events. She also published regularly in newspapers and magazines such as Avant, Joventut Obrera, El Eco de Gerona, and El Nord de Girona, among others, and contributed to El Semanario de Banyoles, Marinada, Vida Banyolina, and Tiempos Críticos. Torrent's prose and poetry, mostly rural, traditional, and religious, remained outside the cultural currents of the 20th century, as her main inspiration came from the Renaixença and popular poetry.

Her social position and conservative ideology conflicted with the ideals of the Second Republic, affecting her literary output, which, over the years, took on an increasingly religious tone. During the Spanish Civil War, two of her sons, enlisted in the Terç de Requetès de la Mare de Déu de Montserrat, and died on the front lines. This, followed by the ban on publications in Catalan language, led to her not publishing her work again until 1953, when she agreed to write the opening speech for the Agullana Festival, which included four verses written in Catalan.

== Death and legacy ==
Francesca Torrent died in Barcelona on April 15, 1958.

A voluminous prose work and several collections of her poetry remain unpublished and are housed in the Figueras Regional Historical Archive. Narcís-Jordi Aragó dedicated the article "Francisca Torrent, Rural Costumisme i Poesia Popular" to Torrent, as well as an anthology of women's poetry, Las cinco ramas (The Five Branches) (1975), which includes Torrent's biography and a poem.

In 2011, her name was included in the 1st Congress of Women in the Literary Field: The State of the Art.

== Awards and honours ==
She won several awards throughout her career. Her 1910 novel Almas pariones won an award at the Banyoles Floral Games. In 1955, she won a prize from the Girona Provincial Council in the Marian Contest in Figueres for her work, Sonets marians.

== Selected works ==
- 1910, Almas pariones: assaig de novela
- 1955, La Mare de Déu de la Salut d'Empordà.
