= Col du Perthus =

Mountain pass on the France–Spain border

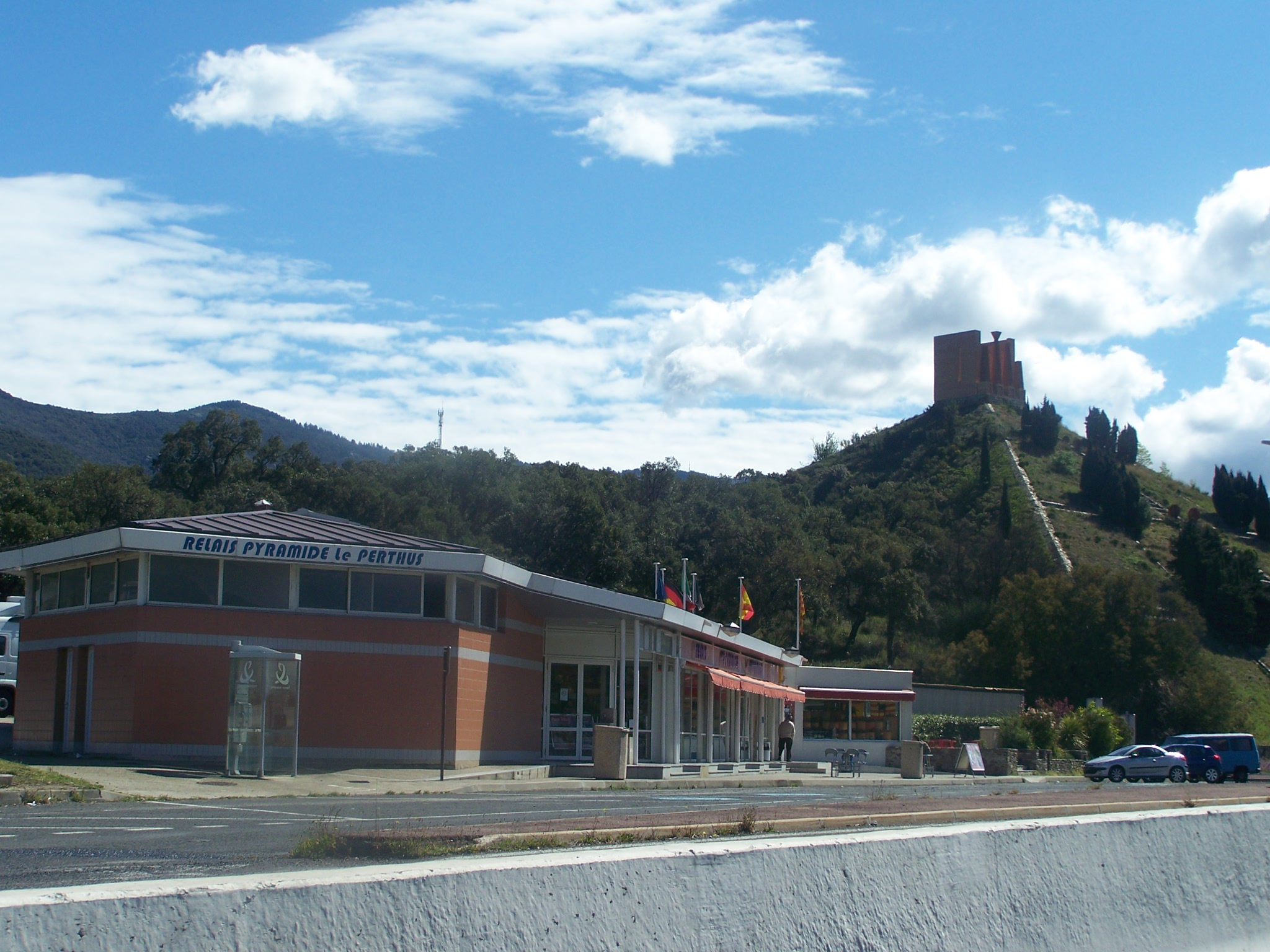
- The French side of the pass, with Le Perthus Pyramid to the right

- Location within France
- Elevation: 290 m (950 ft)
- Traversed by: D900, A9, N-II, AP-7

Location
- Location: Le Perthus
- Range: Pyrenees
- Coordinates: 42°27′50″N 2°51′56″E

The Col du Perthus (in Catalan: Coll de Pertús) is a mountain pass of the Pyrenees on the France–Spain border, between the Pyrénées-Orientales in Languedoc-Roussillon, Midi-Pyrénées and the Province of Girona in Catalonia.

Rising to an altitude of 290 metres (950 ft), it is one of the lowest border passes in the Pyrenees. It marks the western boundary of the Albera Massif. The village of Le Perthus was founded at the col in 1836. The location is the subject of a noted engraving by Gustave Doré, reproduced in Doré’s Spain.

== See also ==
- List of mountain passes
