= L'Albère =

L’Albère
- Commune
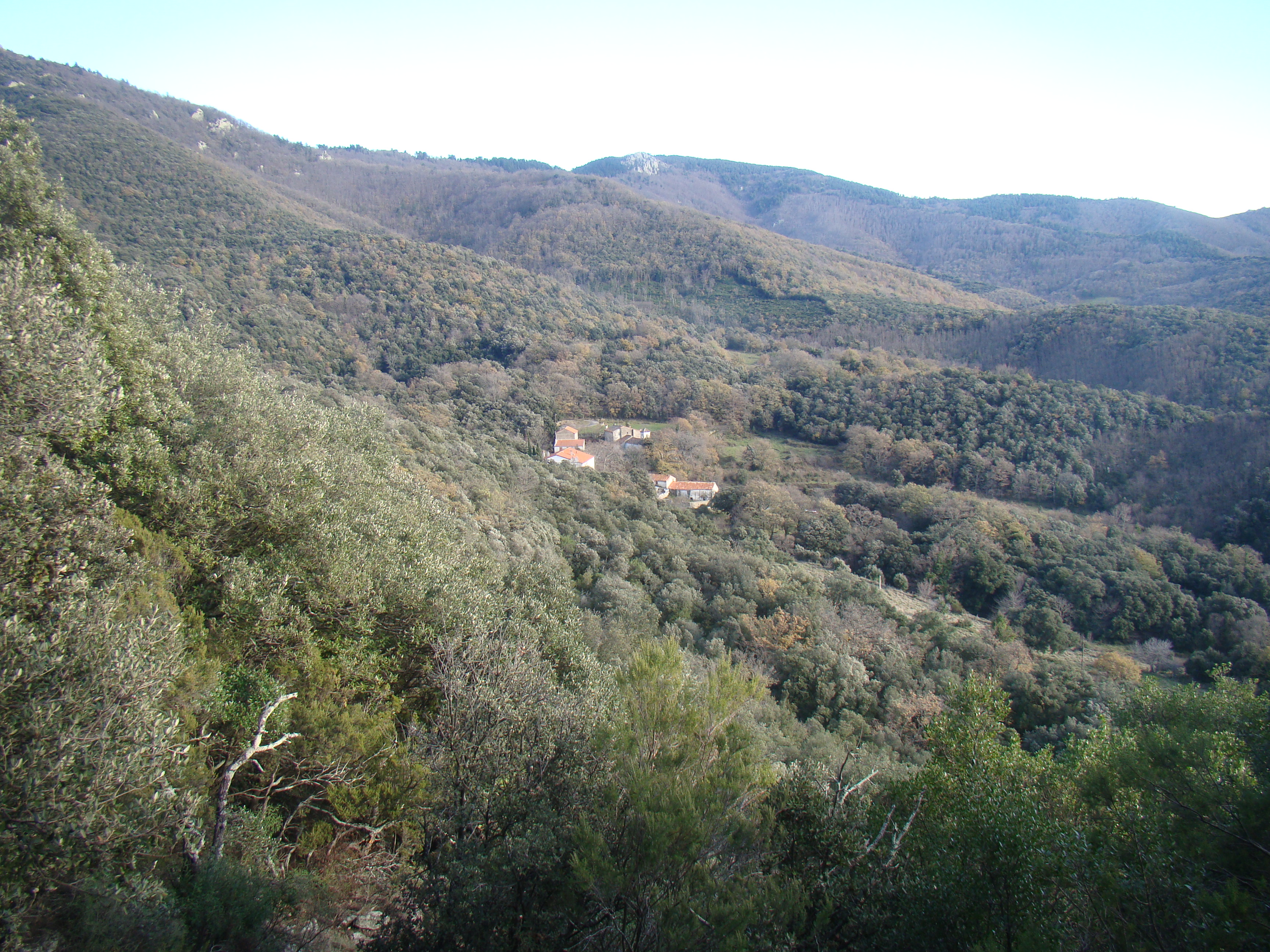
- The hamlet of Saint-Jean seen from the trail leading to the dolmen of Balma de Na Cristiana
- Location of L’Albère
- Location within France Location within Occitanie
- Coordinates: 42°29′01″N 2°53′41″E
- Country: France
- Region: Occitania
- Department: Pyrénées-Orientales
- Arrondissement: Céret
- Canton: Vallespir-Albères
- Intercommunality: Vallespir

Government
  - Mayor (2026–32): Marc de Besombes-Singla
- Area^{1}: 17.10 km^{2} (6.60 sq mi)
- Elevation: 532 m (1,745 ft)
- Highest elevation: 1,116 m (3,661 ft)
- Lowest elevation: 266 m (873 ft)
- Population (2023): 64
  - Density: 3.7/km^{2} (9.7/sq mi)
- Time zone: UTC+01:00 (CET)
  - Summer (DST): UTC+02:00 (CEST)
- INSEE/Postal code: 66001 /66480
- ^{1} French Land Register data, which excludes lakes, ponds, glaciers > 1 km^{2} (0.386 sq mi or 247 acres) and river estuaries.

L'Albère (French pronunciation: [lalbɛʁ]; Catalan: L'Albera) is a commune in the Pyrénées-Orientales department in southern France.

== Geography ==
=== Localisation ===
L'Albère is located in the canton of Vallespir-Albères and in the arrondissement of Céret.

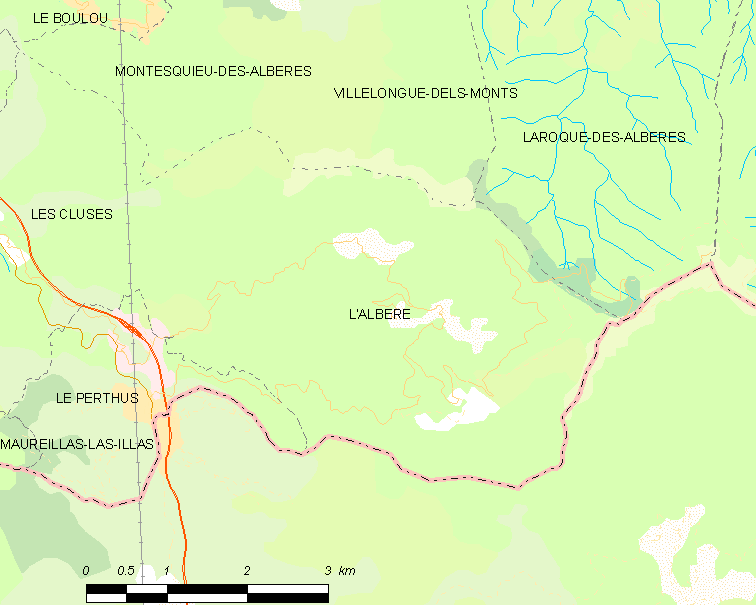
Map of L'Albère and its surrounding communes

== Toponymy ==
The name of L'Albère is clearly issued from the Albera Massif in which it is located. Although always plural in French (Albères) concerning the mountain range, the name remains singular through the ages (L'Albère) for the commune. On the contrary, in Catalan, the name has always been singular for both the mountain (Serra de l'Albera) and the place (L'Albera).

== History ==
Early settlements of population grew near the two primitive churches: Saint Martin, already named in 844 (cella Sancti Martini de Monte Furcato) and Saint John, known since 1089 (ecclesiae Sancti Ioannis de Albera). The hamlets of Saint Martin and Saint John both still exist nowadays, each with its church.

== Government and politics ==
=== Canton ===
In 1790, the commune of L'Albère is included into the canton of Argelès, then part of the Céret district. It is moved to the canton of Laroque in 1793 and back to the canton of Argelès in 1801, before being finally included in the canton of Céret in 1947. Following the French canton reorganisation which came into effect in March 2015, L'Albère is now part of the canton of Vallespir-Albères.

=== Mayors ===
List of successive mayors of L'Albère
Mayor	In office		Party	Notes
Sylvestre Vilallongue	1795	1801		
Jacques Oriol	1802	1813		
Joseph Reste	1813	1830		
Jacques Oriol	1831	1834		
Joseph Reste fils	1835	1877		
Albert Oriol	1878	1884		
Gustave Tarres	1885	1887		
Auguste Vinyes	1888	1904		
Justin Besombes	1904	1934		
Antoine de Besombes-Singla	1935	1971		
Pierre de Besombes-Singla	March 1971	April 2013		
Marc de Besombes-Singla	May 2013	Incumbent		Son of previous mayor.

== Population and society ==
=== Demography ===
Historical population
Year	Pop.	±% p.a.
1968	61	—
1975	62	+0.23%
1982	50	−3.03%
1990	54	+0.97%
1999	69	+2.76%
2007	74	+0.88%
2012	82	+2.07%
2017	80	−0.49%
2023	64	−3.65%
Source: INSEE

=== Education ===
There is no school in L'Albère. The nearest is in Le Perthus.

=== Events ===
- Patronal feast : 5 August.
- Communal feast : 2nd Sunday of August.

=== Health ===
There are no doctors in L'Albère. The nearest are in Le Perthus.

=== Sports ===
L'Albère has several climbing sites.

== Sites of interest ==
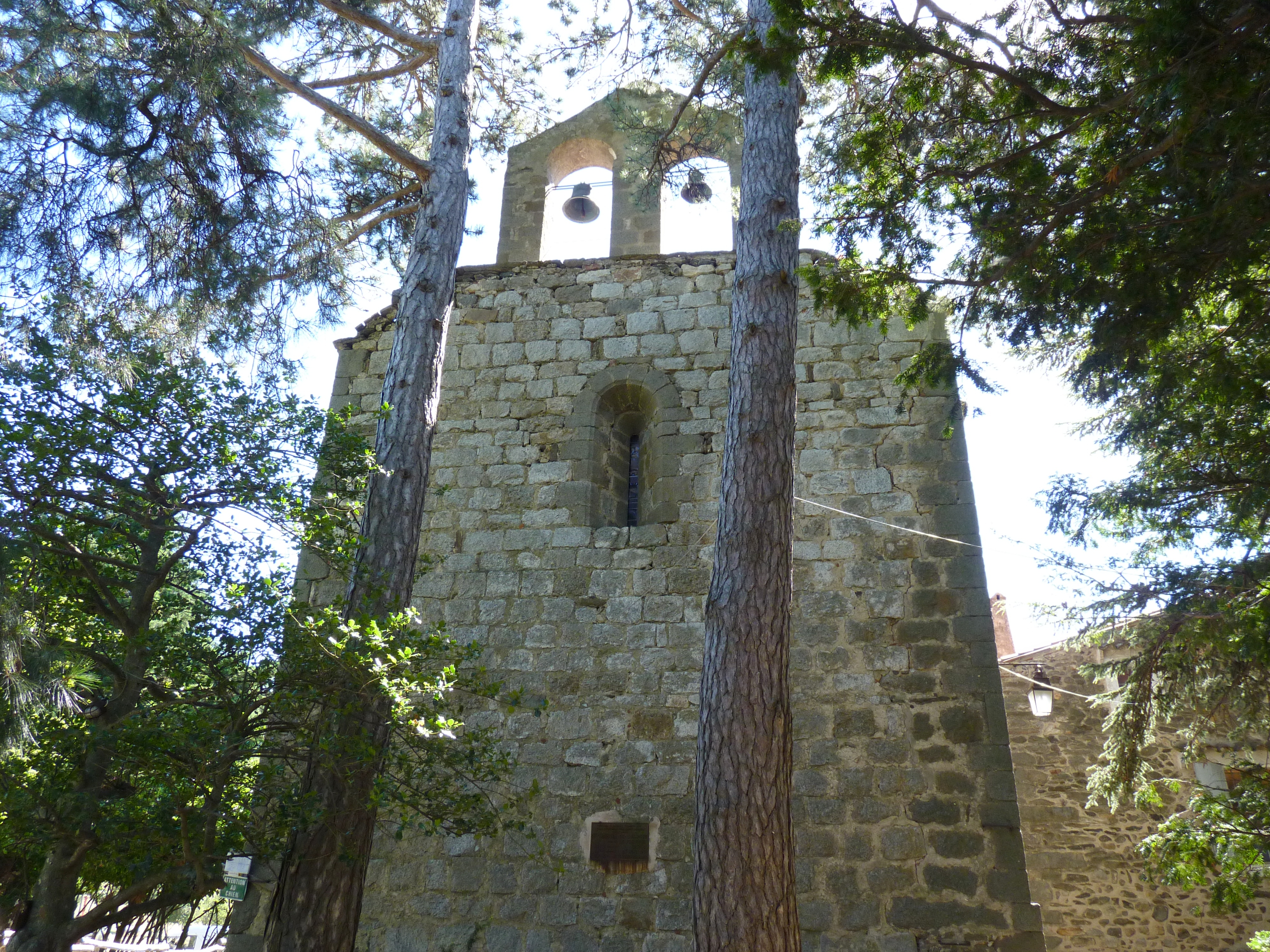
Church Saint-Martin

- Balma de Na Cristiana : a large dolmen.
- Saint-John Church
- Saint-Martin Church
- Saint-Christopher chapel

== See also ==
- Communes of the Pyrénées-Orientales department
