= Cork tree =

Cork tree or corktree may refer to:

- Cork oak, Quercus suber, the tree from which most cork is harvested
- Chinese cork oak, Quercus variabilis, a tree from which cork is occasionally harvested
- Cork-tree, a species of Phellodendron
- Euonymus phellomanus, a large deciduous shrub with corky “wings”
- Indian cork tree, Millingtonia hortensis
- From Under The Cork Tree, a 2005 album by Fall Out Boy
