= Agullana =

- Municipality
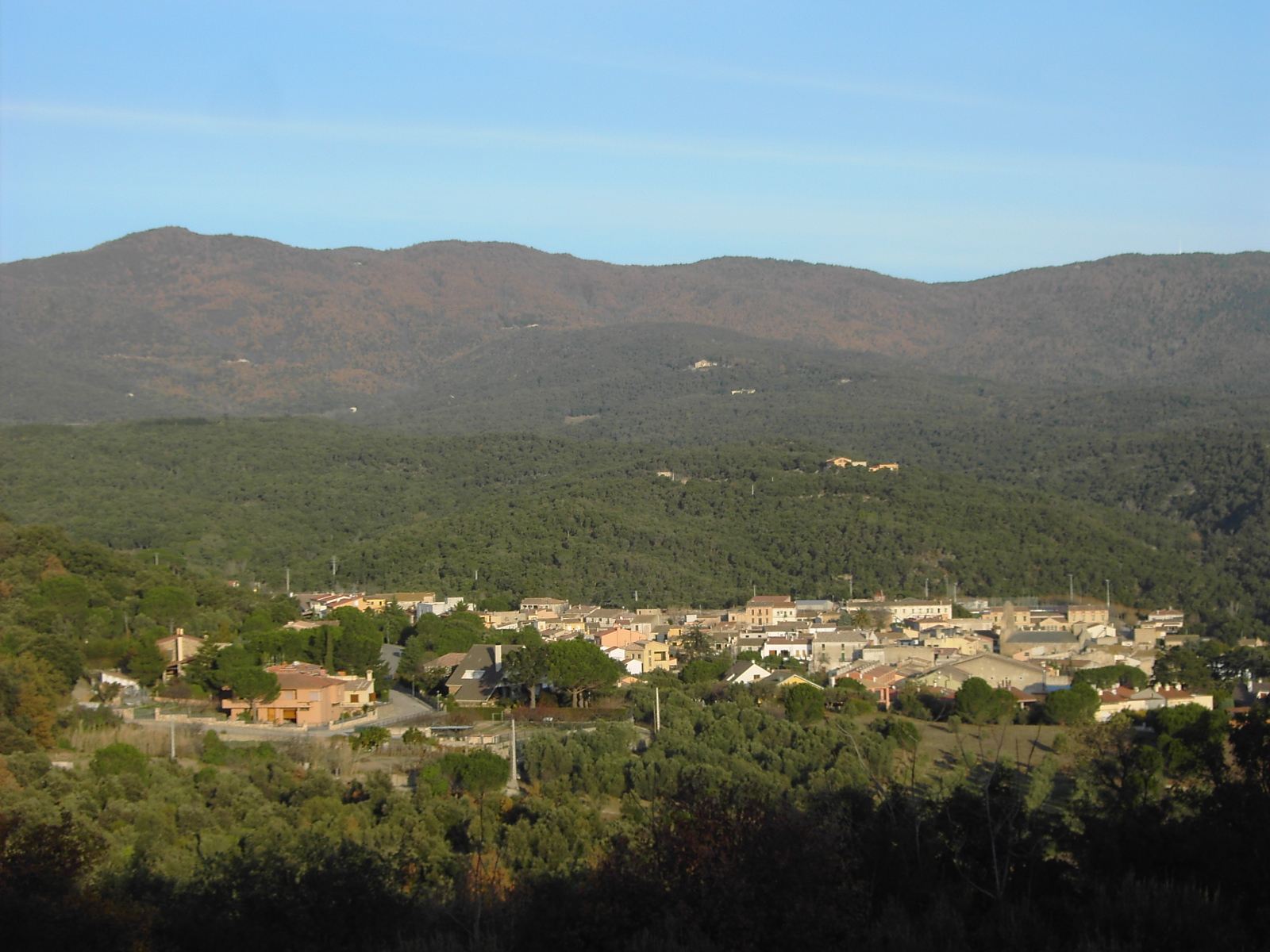
- Agullana

- Coat of arms

- Location in Catalonia Agullana (Spain)
- Coordinates: 42°24′N 2°51′E
- Country: Spain
- Community: Catalonia
- Province: Girona
- Comarca: Alt Empordà

Government
  - mayor: Marina Gutés Serra (2015)

Area
  - Total: 27.7 km^{2} (10.7 sq mi)

Population (2025-01-01)
  - Total: 880
  - Density: 32/km^{2} (82/sq mi)
- Website: agullana.cat

Agullana (Catalan pronunciation: [əɣuˈʎanə]) is a municipality in the comarca of Alt Empordà, Girona, Catalonia, Spain.

== Notable people ==
- Francesca Torrent (1881-1958), writer
