= Sant Miquel del Fai =

Coordinates: 41.71609°N 2.190473°E

- Sant Miquel del Fai (Catalan)
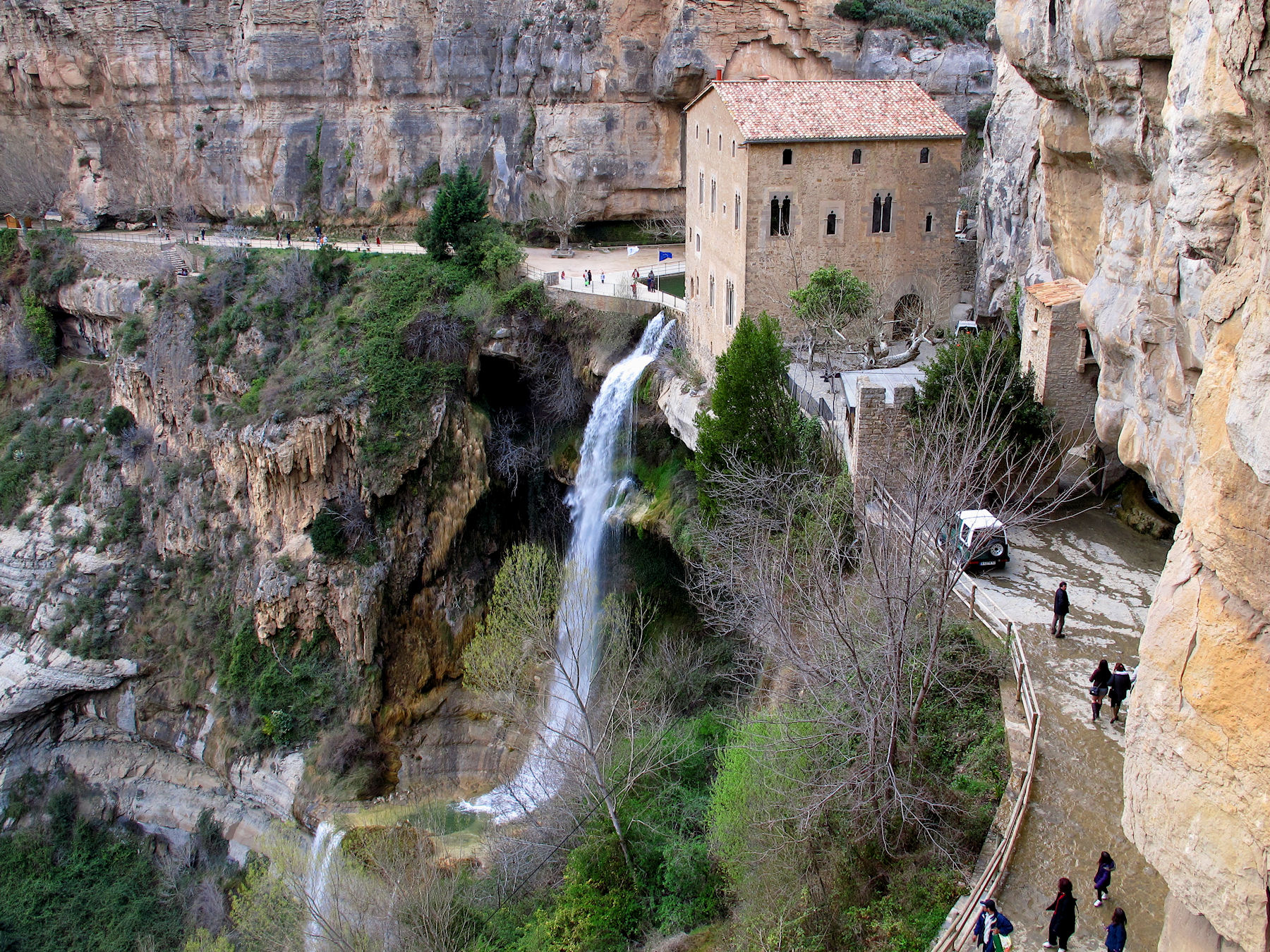
- Sant Miquel de Fai

- Location within Catalonia
- Location: Bigues i Riells, Catalonia, Spain

Site notes
- Architectural styles: Romanesque; Gothic

Spanish Cultural Heritage
- Official name: Sant Miquel del Fai
- Type: Non-movable
- Criteria: Monument
- Designated: November 8, 1988
- Reference no.: RI-51-0005209

Sant Miquel del Fai is a cenobitic Benedictine monastery in Bigues i Riells, Catalonia, Spain. The 11th-century building was declared a Bien de Interés Cultural landmark in 1988.

== Location ==
The monastery is located in a well-preserved natural environment framed by rocky cliffs called Cingles de Bertí in the Catalan pre-coastal mountain range which geographically separates the region of Vallès Oriental in the subregion of Moianès. The Natural Area Sant Miquel del Fai is located in the municipality of Bigues i Riells.

== Architecture and fittings ==
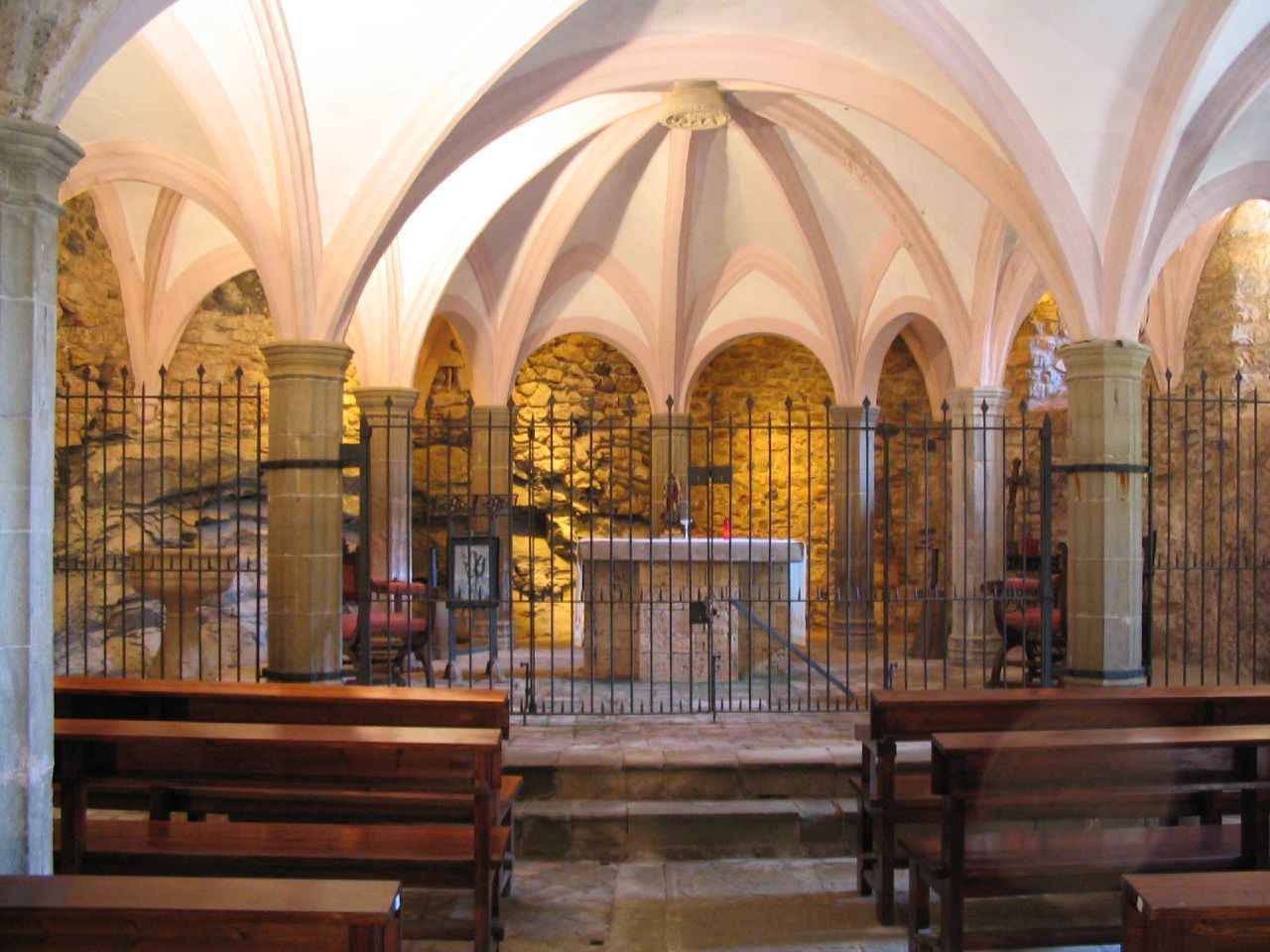
Interior view

The church has a Romanesque doorway formed by a semicircular arch. A pair of columns are topped with capitals decorated with plant motifs. Only a few traces remain of the high altar. It has a small crypt which is accessed via a staircase located near the entrance. On the floor of the church, the headstones of the old abbots are visible. In side chapels, there are two graves. One, dating to the 13th century, is believed to correspond to Guillem, Earl Osona and brother of Ramon Berenguer I, who, after waiving his rights, was a monk of Sant Miquel. The other tomb may be that of Andreu Arbizu, a monk from Navarre, who provided goods to the monastery. The old priory house style is Gothic and dates to the 15th century. For many years, it has served as a hostel, but retains its original layout.

== Bibliography ==
- Pladevall, Antoni: Els monestirs catalans, Edicions Destino, Barcelona, 1970 ISBN 84-233-0511-2 (in Catalan)
