= Le Perthus Pyramid =

Mid-1970s landmark near the French-Spanish border

Coordinates: 42.4752°N 2.8608°E

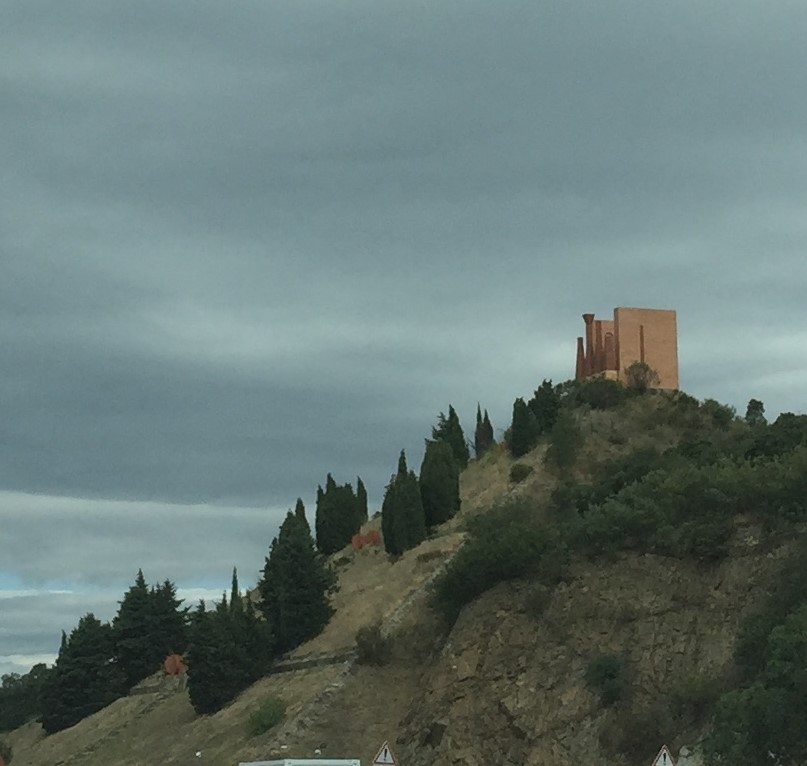
The Pyramid in 2017

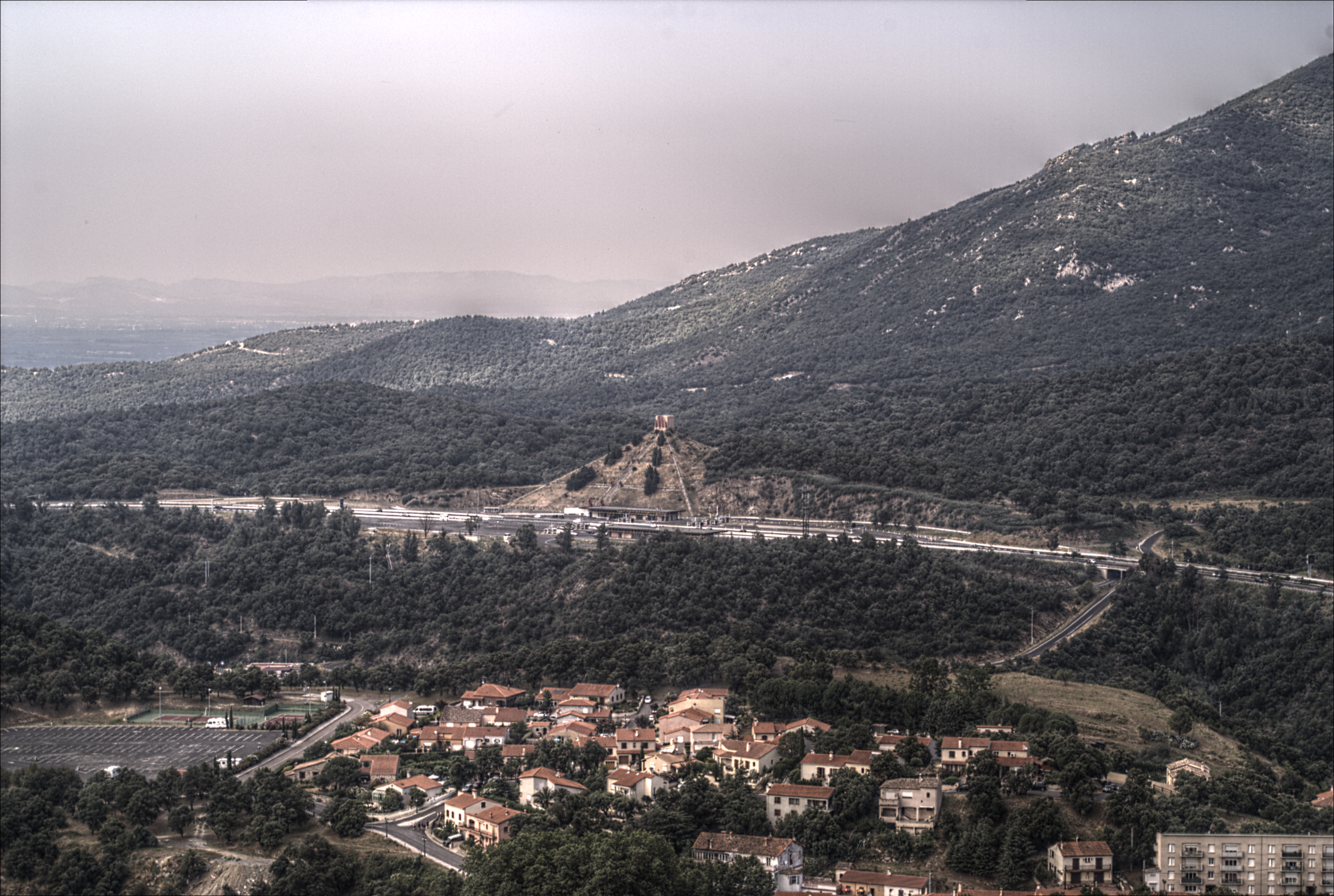
Le Perthus Pyramid bordering the A9 motorway

Le Perthus Pyramid (French: la pyramide du Perthus), also referred to as Marca Hispanica and locally as Bofill's Pyramid, is a work of landscape architecture designed by Ricardo Bofill Taller de Arquitectura at Le Perthus, France. It is located on the side of the A9 motorway, just north of the France–Spain border at the Col du Perthus, which it was built to mark symbolically. It was designed in 1974 and completed in 1976.

== History and description ==
The Pyramid was commissioned by the highway operator Autoroutes du Sud de la France for their public art program. A broader landscaping project was first envisaged, dubbed the Park of the Marca Hispanica with reference to the ancient name for Catalan territories south of the Pyrenean passes. Ricardo Bofill Taller de Arquitectura's initial concept was of a one-kilometer-long sequence of artificial landscape along the highway, a "longitudinal monument" to mark the transition from Spain to France, punctuated by visually striking shapes including a series of colossal truncated pyramids. The later design process focused on a single artificial pyramid-shaped hill to be built from materials excavated during the construction of the highway.

The pyramid's base is a notional square of 160 meters side length, above which it rises to a height of 70 meters. Ricardo Bofill and his team viewed it as a celebration of the role of the Pyrenean mountain passes, and especially of the Col du Perthus, in Catalan history. To that effect, the four columns at the top evoke the Catalan national emblem or Senyera. The design carries further influences from Mesoamerican architecture, Italian gardens, and surrealism.

As it was inaugurated in 1976 after the death of Francisco Franco and the start of the Spanish transition to democracy, the pyramid also became a symbol for Spain's European aspirations and opening to its northern neighbors.

== See also ==
- List of works by Ricardo Bofill Taller de Arquitectura
- Monumento a la Raza (Mexico City)
- Labirinto della Masone
- Mesoamerican pyramids
