= Le Perthus =

- Commune
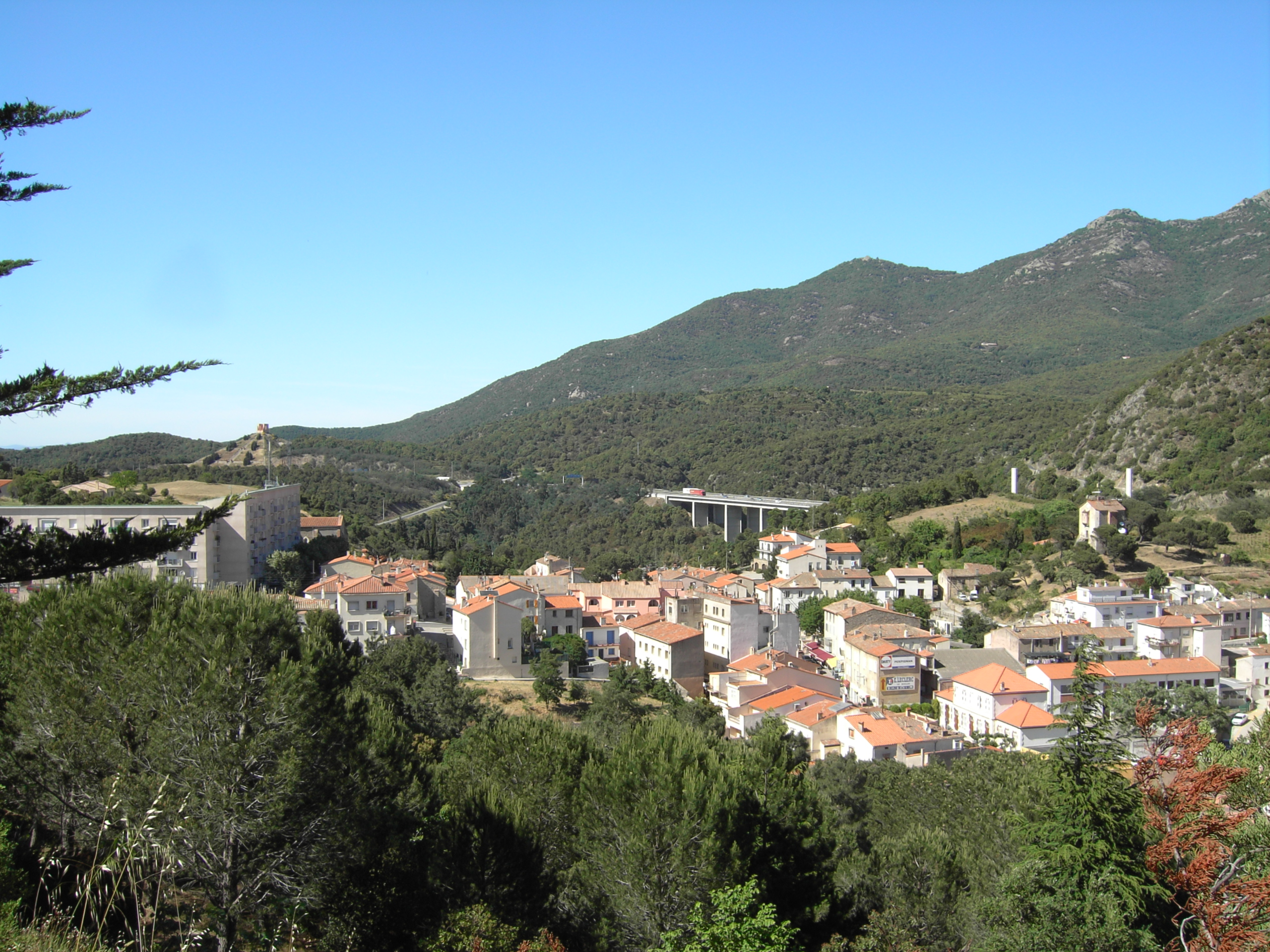
- View from the Fort de Bellegarde. To the right the Spanish village of Els Límits

- Coat of arms
- Location of Le Perthus
- Location within France Location within Occitanie
- Coordinates: 42°27′54″N 2°51′48″E
- Country: France
- Region: Occitania
- Department: Pyrénées-Orientales
- Arrondissement: Céret
- Canton: Vallespir-Albères

Government
  - Mayor (2020–2026): Thierry Thadée
- Area^{1}: 4.27 km^{2} (1.65 sq mi)
- Elevation: 280 m (920 ft)
- Highest elevation: 647 m (2,123 ft)
- Lowest elevation: 196 m (643 ft)
- Population (2023): 555
  - Density: 130/km^{2} (337/sq mi)
- Time zone: UTC+01:00 (CET)
  - Summer (DST): UTC+02:00 (CEST)
- INSEE/Postal code: 66137 /66480
- ^{1} French Land Register data, which excludes lakes, ponds, glaciers > 1 km^{2} (0.386 sq mi or 247 acres) and river estuaries.

Le Perthus (French: [lə pɛʁtys], Catalan: El Pertús, IPA: [əl pəɾˈtus]) is a commune in the Pyrénées-Orientales department in southern France. Natives of Le Perthus are called Perthusiens.

== Geography ==
Le Perthus is situated in the canton of Vallespir-Albères and the arrondissement of Céret, in the historical region of Vallespir, on the borders with Catalonia, Spain. Its contiguous Spanish twin town, Els Límits (a parish of the commune of La Jonquera, in the Province of Girona), is situated in the east and south side of the urban area. Also part of the main road, Avenue de France, is in both France and Spain; and its eastern side (in Els Limits) is named Avinguda de Catalunya. Out of the main road, in which is situated the checkpoint (totally on the Spanish side), the other principal roads are Rue du Fort de Bellegarde (panoramic hill road to the fortress), Carrer del Dalt, Rue du Mas Rimbau, Calle del Correc (binational) and Rue de l'Église. It lies 6 km (4 mi) from La Jonquera, 14 km (9 mi) from Céret, 28 km (17 mi) from Figueres, 34 km (21 mi) from Perpignan, 64 km (40 mi) from Girona and 161 km (100 mi) from Barcelona.

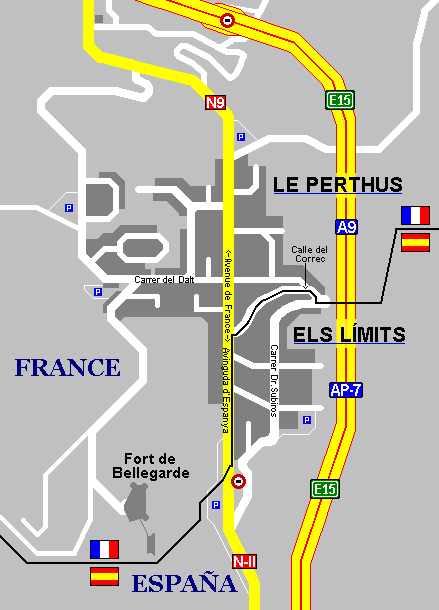
Map of the twin villages

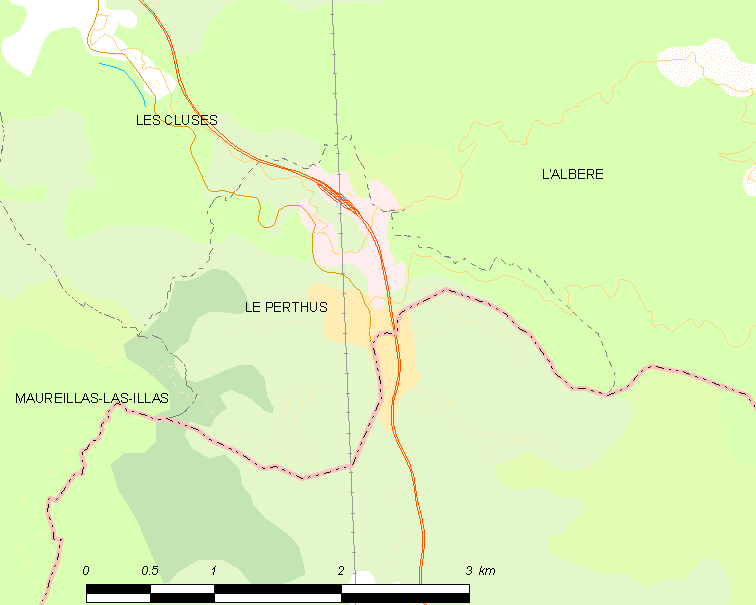
Map of Le Perthus and its surrounding communes

== Climate ==
On average, Le Perthus experiences 8.6 days per year with a minimum temperature below 0 °C (32.0 °F), no days per year with a minimum temperature below −10 °C (14.0 °F), 0.1 days per year with a maximum temperature below 0 °C (32.0 °F), and 41.0 days per year with a maximum temperature above 30 °C (86.0 °F). The record high temperature was 41.6 °C (106.9 °F) on 28 June 2019, while the record low temperature was −6.0 °C (21.2 °F) on 9 February 2012.

Climate data for Le Perthus (1991–2020 normals, extremes 1989–present)
Month	Jan	Feb	Mar	Apr	May	Jun	Jul	Aug	Sep	Oct	Nov	Dec	Year
Record high °C (°F)	23.5 (74.3)	24.8 (76.6)	27.1 (80.8)	30.7 (87.3)	33.5 (92.3)	41.6 (106.9)	38.3 (100.9)	41.5 (106.7)	36.0 (96.8)	31.1 (88.0)	24.4 (75.9)	22.1 (71.8)	41.6 (106.9)
Mean daily maximum °C (°F)	11.8 (53.2)	12.7 (54.9)	15.8 (60.4)	18.2 (64.8)	22.0 (71.6)	26.3 (79.3)	29.4 (84.9)	29.5 (85.1)	25.1 (77.2)	20.4 (68.7)	15.2 (59.4)	12.3 (54.1)	19.9 (67.8)
Daily mean °C (°F)	8.1 (46.6)	8.6 (47.5)	11.3 (52.3)	13.5 (56.3)	17.1 (62.8)	21.1 (70.0)	23.9 (75.0)	24.0 (75.2)	20.2 (68.4)	16.3 (61.3)	11.5 (52.7)	8.8 (47.8)	15.4 (59.7)
Mean daily minimum °C (°F)	4.5 (40.1)	4.5 (40.1)	6.9 (44.4)	8.9 (48.0)	12.2 (54.0)	16.0 (60.8)	18.4 (65.1)	18.5 (65.3)	15.2 (59.4)	12.2 (54.0)	7.9 (46.2)	5.2 (41.4)	10.9 (51.6)
Record low °C (°F)	−5.6 (21.9)	−6.0 (21.2)	−5.2 (22.6)	0.0 (32.0)	3.0 (37.4)	7.0 (44.6)	11.3 (52.3)	10.8 (51.4)	6.8 (44.2)	1.1 (34.0)	−3.6 (25.5)	−4.5 (23.9)	−6.0 (21.2)
Average precipitation mm (inches)	76.4 (3.01)	57.6 (2.27)	71.7 (2.82)	87.2 (3.43)	74.1 (2.92)	49.3 (1.94)	27.7 (1.09)	43.6 (1.72)	75.6 (2.98)	110.6 (4.35)	99.6 (3.92)	76.2 (3.00)	849.6 (33.45)
Average precipitation days (≥ 1.0 mm)	5.6	4.8	5.8	7.9	7.2	5.2	3.6	4.7	5.6	6.9	6.2	4.9	68.4
Source: Meteociel

== Toponymy ==
The name appears as Pertusium in 1306 and as Lo Pertus in 1343. Its origin is from the Latin pertusum meaning an opening in the mountain.

The name in Catalan is El Pertús.

== History ==
In the early 14th century, Le Perthus was a property of the counts of Roussillon and Empúries.

Following the Treaty of the Pyrenees in 1659, the town represented the border with Spain.

Le Perthus first became a commune on 1 February 1837, by uniting the communes of Les Cluses and L'Albère. But because of too many protests from the people of those communes, they were separated on 29 November 1837. It was then decided many years later to make Le Perthus a commune in itself again. This time, small parts of territory only were taken from Les Cluses and L'Albère, and the village of Le Perthus once again became a commune on 29 April 1851. Municipal elections had already been organised in 1848 and quickly cancelled as it appeared that the mayor and the deputy-mayor had too many family ties with several of the municipal councillors, which is forbidden by French law.

In the 20th century Le Perthus was the site of a camp housing Republican escapees from Spain at the end of the Spanish Civil War.

== Population ==
Historical population
Year	Pop.	±% p.a.
1968	862	—
1975	699	−2.95%
1982	644	−1.16%
1990	634	−0.20%
1999	620	−0.25%
2007	579	−0.85%
2012	580	+0.03%
2017	574	−0.21%
2023	555	−0.56%
Source: INSEE

== Economy ==
Le Perthus is a border town, partly in Spain and partly in France, situated on the Route Nationale RN9. The frontier passes through part of the main street. The Spanish part is almost entirely devoted to the sale of alcohol, tobacco and other goods which are considerably cheaper than in France, resulting in the town being crowded with bargain hunters from France. In earlier times it was a convenient centre of contraband.

== Places of interest ==
- Fort de Bellegarde is located on a hilltop above Le Perthus.
- Le Perthus Pyramid was erected near the motorway in the mid-1970s.

== See also ==
- Col du Perthus
- Communes of the Pyrénées-Orientales department
